= Citizens Cemetery =

Burial ground in Beaufort, South Carolina

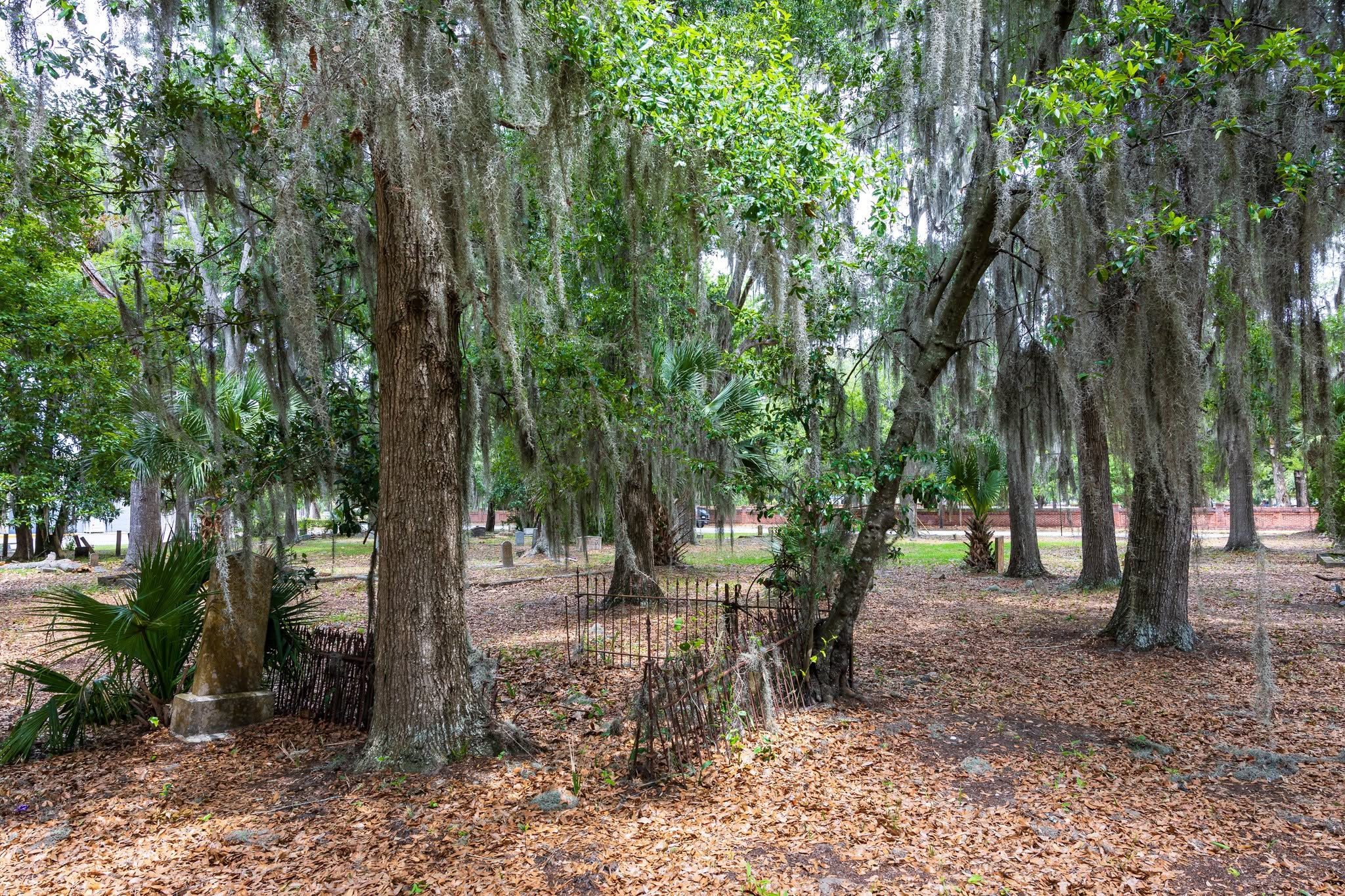
- The grave of Percy H. Washington (Dr. Eagle) in the cemetery
- Interactive map of Citizens Cemetery

Details
- Location: Hamar Street, Beaufort, South Carolina, U.S.
- Coordinates: 32.43930°N 80.68120°W
- Owned by: City of Beaufort
- Find a Grave: Citizens Cemetery

Citizens Cemetery is located on Hamar Street in Beaufort, South Carolina, United States. Sited adjacent to Beaufort National Cemetery, Citizens Cemetery is the "garden" referred to in the title of John Berendt's 1994 novel Midnight in the Garden of Good and Evil. In the subsequent movie, directed by Clint Eastwood, Bonaventure Cemetery in Savannah, Georgia, was used to represent "the colored cemetery down the road", as described by Kevin Spacey's character, Jim Williams.

Minerva, the root doctor in Midnight in the Garden of Good and Evil (portrayed by Irma P. Hall in the movie), is based on Valerie Boles. Boles's common-law partner Percy H. Washington (1890–1973) is interred in Citizens Cemetery. Also a root doctor, he was known as Dr. Eagle (renamed Dr. Buzzard in the book and movie). Boles and Washington lived at 1408 Congress Street in Beaufort, two blocks east of the cemetery. After Washington's death in 1973, his widow married Edward Boles.
