= J. C. Backings =

American scenery company

- Industry: Film scenery
- Founded: 1962 (64 years ago)
- Founder: John Harold Coakley; John Gary Coakley
- Headquarters: Culver City, California, U.S.
- Area served: United States
- Key people: Lynne Coakley (president)
- Website: https://www.jcbackings.com/

J. C. Backings Corporation is a scenic-backdrop rental company based in Culver City, California. It was established in 1962 by John Harold Coakley and his son, John Gary Coakley, who realized there was a need for custom painted backings and backdrop rentals for American film and television companies. In 1970, the company purchased over 2,000 backdrops from the storage facility of Metro-Goldwyn-Mayer.

Backings were expanded via photographic alternatives (known as translites) and digital print vinyl backings with the company's third generation, headed by Gary Coakley's children Lynne and Tod. As of 2020, painted backdrops made up around one-third of the company's rentals.

Tod Coakley died in 2006, aged 44. Pierre Steele, Lynne's husband, joined the company at that point.

After 46 years at Sony Pictures Studios, in 2017 the company relocated its digital print and photograph backing facility to another section of Culver City, while custom paints and touch-ups to painted backings take place in Gardena. During the move, over 250 backings were donated to the Academy of Motion Picture Arts and Sciences, as well as to schools and colleges and the Art Directors Guild Backdrop Recovery Project. Some of these backings were used on films such as Ben-Hur, The Sound of Music, North by Northwest (including the Mount Rushmore backdrop) and Meet Me in Las Vegas.

Lynne Coakley is the company's president.

== Backing examples ==
Two backings from the movie Midnight in the Garden of Good and Evil (1997):

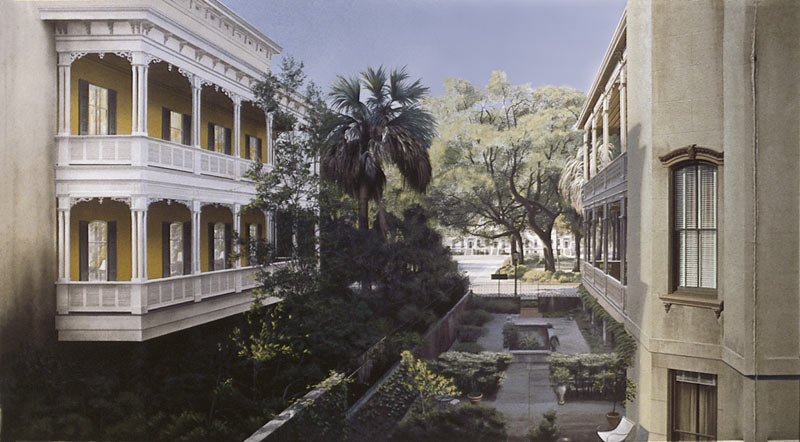
The Comer House (right), where John Cusack's character John Kelso stayed

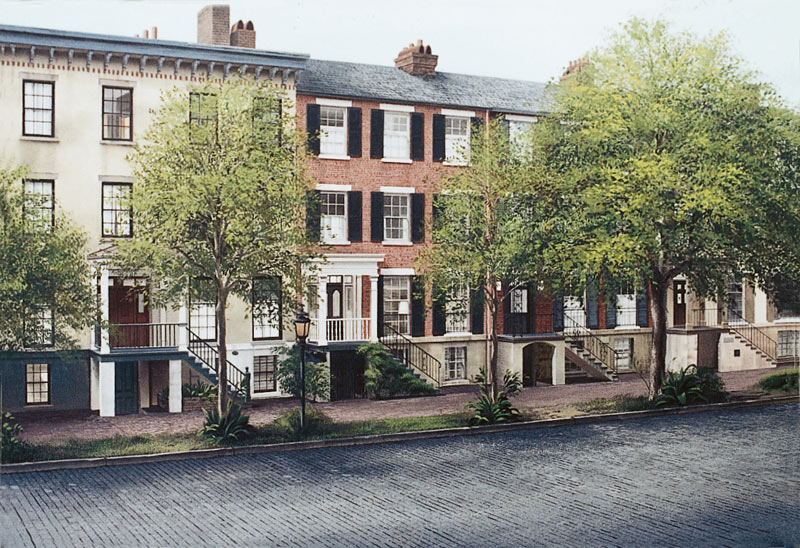
A view of Jones Street, as it would have been from Kelso's window
