= Married Woman's Card Club =

Women's card club in the U.S. State of Georgia

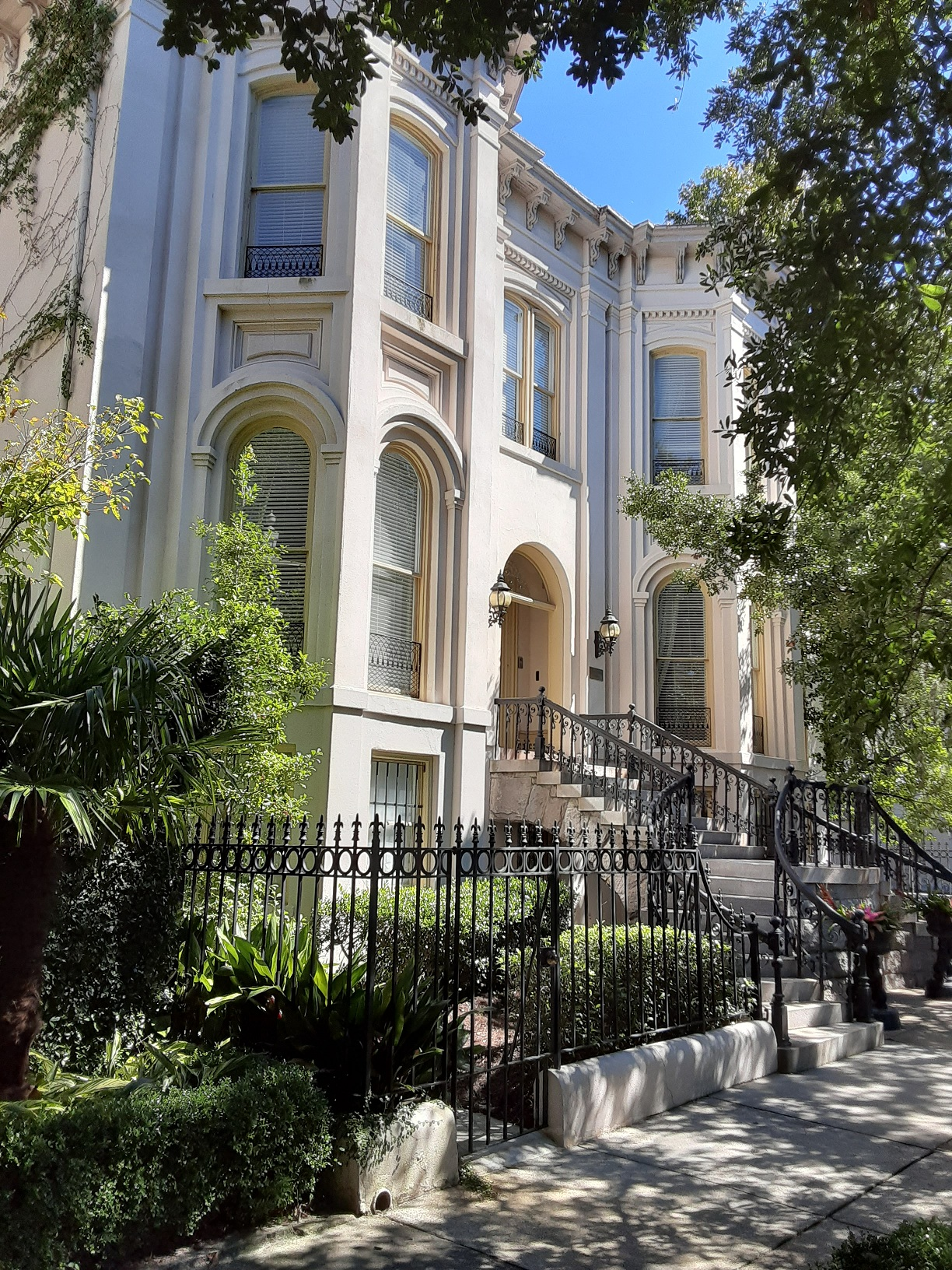
- Granite Hall, one of the club's venues
- Formation: 1893 (133 years ago)
- Location: Savannah, Georgia, U.S.
- Members: 16

Actors portraying members of the Married Woman's Card Club in Midnight in the Garden of Good and Evil (1997)

The Married Woman's Card Club is an exclusive all-women society in Savannah, Georgia, United States, established in 1893. It meets once a month, on Tuesdays at 4:00 PM.

The society is featured in John Berendt's novel Midnight in the Garden of Good and Evil and Clint Eastwood's 1997 movie adaptation of the book. Members (described as "gossipy socialites") take turns hosting the events, although the venue used in both the book and the movie was Granite Hall, near Savannah's Forsyth Park. Only married women are permitted in the club; should they become divorced, they must resign.

It was founded by sixteen ladies in search of amusement during the day while their husbands were at work. There were always sixteen members – no more, no less. Once a month, always on a Tuesday, they would gather at one of the members' homes for two hours of card playing, cocktails, and a light supper.

— John Berendt, Midnight in the Garden of Good and Evil (1994), p. 153

As Berendt explained, 32 guests are invited, so that the number of attendees always totals 48. They sit around twelve card tables. A strict schedule of events begins with the serving of a glass of water:

- 4:15 PM: water
- 4:30 PM: remove water
- 4:40 PM: empty ashtrays
- 4:45 PM: pass napkins
- 5:00 PM: cocktails
- 5:15 PM: second cocktails
- 5:30 PM: third cocktails
- 5:35 PM: last hand, pass linen
- 5:40 PM: serve dinner plates
- 5:45 PM: high score and cut for aces
- 6:00 PM: prizes, ladies leave promptly

The prompt departures at 6:00 PM was to allow the women to get home in time to greet their husbands as they returned.

== Notable members ==
- Martha Gallaudet Waring
