= Granite Hall =

Historic house in Savannah, Georgia

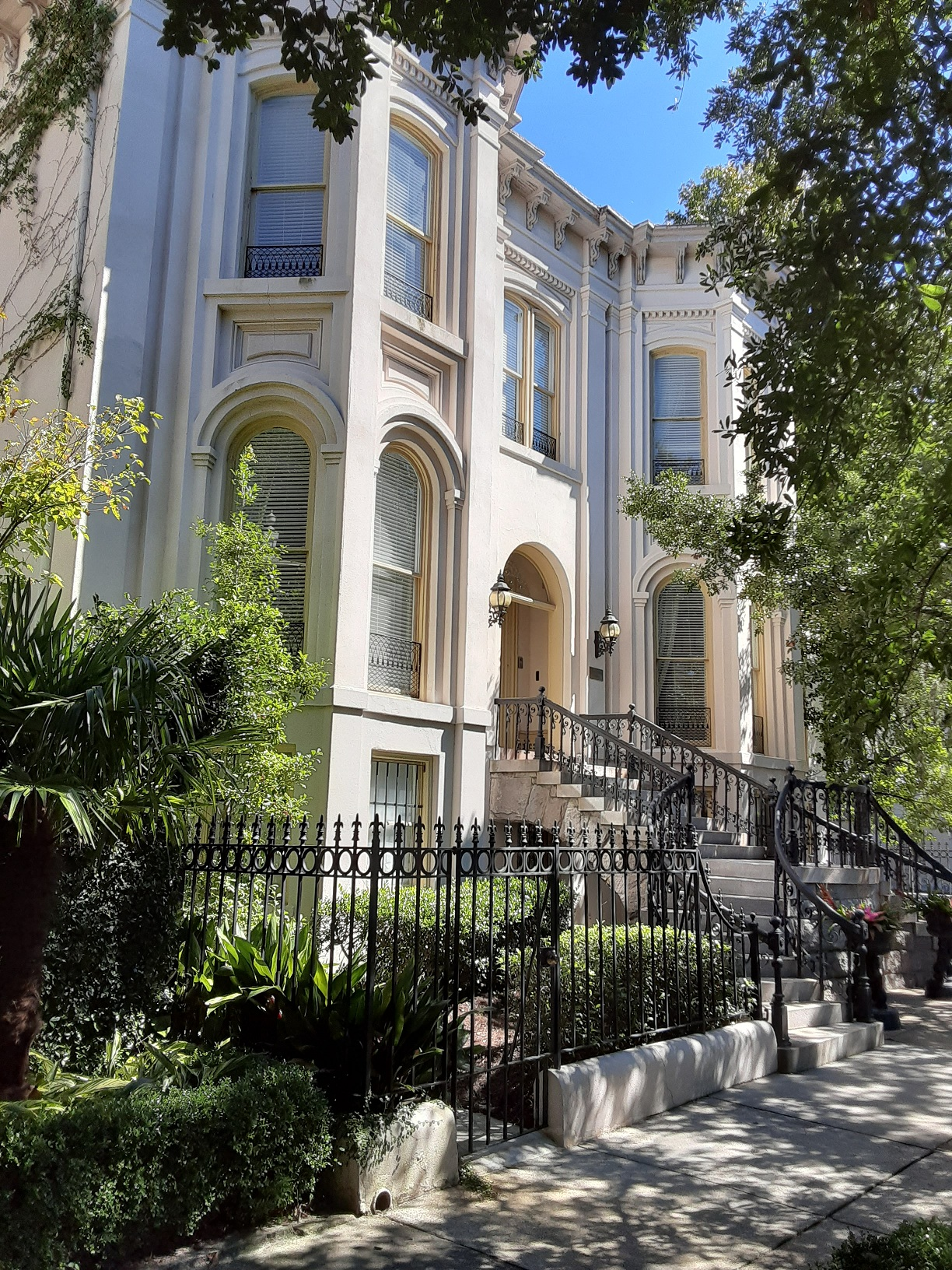
- The building in 2021
- Interactive map of the Granite Hall area
- Former names: Fred Hull House

General information
- Location: Savannah, Georgia, U.S., 126 East Gaston Street
- Coordinates: 32.0699124174°N 81.0931214°W
- Completed: 1881 (145 years ago)
- Owner: Savannah College of Art and Design (since 2006)

Technical details
- Floor count: 3

Design and construction
- Architect: John M. Williams

Granite Hall is an Italianate mansion in Savannah, Georgia, United States. It is located on East Gaston Street, just to the northeast of Forsyth Park. It is part of the Savannah Historic District, and was built in 1881 for Fred Hull. In a survey for Historic Savannah Foundation, Mary Lane Morrison found the building to be of significant status.

The building was used as the venue for the Married Woman's Card Club visited by John Cusack's character, John Kelso, in the 1997 movie Midnight in the Garden of Good and Evil. Jim Williams, upon whom both the movie and the book on which it was based was centered, purchased the house in the mid-1980s and began an extensive restoration program on it; he died before it was completed, however. Around that time, it was the Granite Steps guest house, so named for its double-entry staircase that ascends from the street.

Since 2006, the property has been owned by the Savannah College of Art and Design (SCAD).

== See also ==
- Buildings in Savannah Historic District
