= Stephen Robinson (root doctor) =

American voodoo practitioner

- Born: Stephany Robinson; 1885; Frogmore, South Carolina, U.S.
- Died: May 5, 1947 (aged 61–62); Beaufort County, South Carolina, U.S.
- Resting place: Saint Helena Memorial Gardens, Beaufort, South Carolina, U.S.
- Occupation: Root doctor
- Known for: Inspiration for a character in Midnight in the Garden of Good and Evil

Stephany "Stephen" Robinson (1885 – May 5, 1947) was an American root doctor. His first name has also been spelled Stepheney and Stephaney. He came to prominence after his association with Minerva, one of the main characters in John Berendt's 1994 true-crime book Midnight in the Garden of Good and Evil. Valerie Boles, of Gullah tongue, was the inspiration for Minerva in the book, and was portrayed by Irma P. Hall in Clint Eastwood's 1997 film adaptation. Boles's husband, Percy Washington, was a root doctor known as Dr. Eagle, who was renamed "Dr. Buzzard" in the film adaptation of the story. Dr. Buzzard was based on Robinson.

== Early life ==
Stephany Robinson grew up on Saint Helena Island, South Carolina. Reportedly the son of a witch doctor who emigrated from West Africa, he began practising "root work" in the early 1900s.

== Career ==
Robinson was accused, by James Edwin McTeer, sheriff of Beaufort County, of practicing medicine without a license. The case failed when McTeer's primary witness collapsed on the witness stand.

== Personal life ==
Robinson married Molly Bleach, a native of Frogmore, South Carolina. They had one known child together, a son who drowned after driving off a causeway. It was at this point that Robinson decided to give up medicine, but not root doctoring. He passed his medical practise to his son-in-law, known locally as "Buzzy."

He was a member of Saint Helena Island's Baptist Church, and donated funds to replace its sanctuary after a fire.

In 2016, Robinson's grandson was reportedly the only root doctor still practising on the island.

== Death ==
Robinson died in 1947, aged 61 or 62. He was interred in Beaufort's Saint Helena Memorial Gardens.
