= Miss Lettie and Me =

2002 film by Ian Barry

- Based on: "Poor Little Innocent Lamb" by Katherine Paterson
- Screenplay by: Dalene Young
- Directed by: Ian Barry
- Starring: Mary Tyler Moore; Burt Reynolds; Charlie Robinson; Irma P. Hall; Holliston Coleman
- Theme music composer: Alan Williams
- Country of origin: United States
- Original language: English

Production
- Producer: James A. Westman
- Cinematography: William Wages
- Editor: Janet Bartels-Vandagriff
- Running time: 100 minutes
- Production company: Johnson & Johnson Spotlight Presentations

Original release
- Network: TNT
- Release: December 8, 2002

Miss Lettie and Me is a 2002 American made-for-television drama film starring Mary Tyler Moore and Burt Reynolds. It is based on Katherine Paterson's short story "Poor Little Innocent Lamb". The film premiered in TNT on December 8, 2002.

== Cast ==
- Mary Tyler Moore as Lettie Anderson
- Holliston Coleman as Travis
- Charlie Robinson as Isiah Griffin
- Burt Reynolds as Samuel Madison
- Irma P. Hall as Rose Griffin
- Marguerite Hannah as Nadine
- Laura-Shay Griffin as Miss Fleming
- Jennifer Crumbley Bonder as Alison

== Production ==
The film was shot in Griffin, Georgia.

== Reception ==
Radio Times gave the film two stars out of five.
