= Valerie Boles =

American voodoo priestess (1932–2009)

- Boles in 2004
- Born: Valerie Fennell; November 8, 1932; Islandton, South Carolina, U.S.
- Died: May 8, 2009 (aged 76); Beaufort, South Carolina, U.S.
- Resting place: Jerusalem Baptist Church Cemetery, Cummings, South Carolina, U.S.
- Occupation: Root doctor
- Known for: Inspiration for a character in Midnight in the Garden of Good and Evil

Valerie Aiken Boles (née Fennell; November 8, 1932 – May 8, 2009) was an American root doctor. She came to prominence after becoming the inspiration for one of the main characters in John Berendt's 1994 true-crime book Midnight in the Garden of Good and Evil. Boles, of Gullah tongue, was renamed "Minerva" in the book, and was portrayed by Irma P. Hall in Clint Eastwood's 1997 film adaptation.

== Early life ==
Valerie Fennell was born in 1932, in Islandton, South Carolina, to William Husie Fennell, a U.S. Army veteran of the First World War, and Seleaner Jones. Her mother died in 1938, when Valerie was five years old. Her father remarried, to Sheldonia Glover (1917–1979). Between the two marriages, Boles had three brothers and eleven sisters.

At an early age, Boles became a baptized member of the Deep Creek Missionary Baptist Church in Islandton. After graduating Mather Junior College in the early 1960s, she became a licensed beautician in Beaufort County.

== Personal life ==
Boles was in a common-law marriage with Percy H. Washington (1890–1973), a root doctor known as Dr. Eagle (renamed Dr. Buzzard in Midnight in the Garden of Good and Evil) with whom she had one child: Anthony Ray Fennell (1954–2019). Boles took over Washington's practice, which doubled as their 1950-built 1408 Congress Street home in Beaufort, South Carolina, after his death in 1973.

She later married Edward Boles.

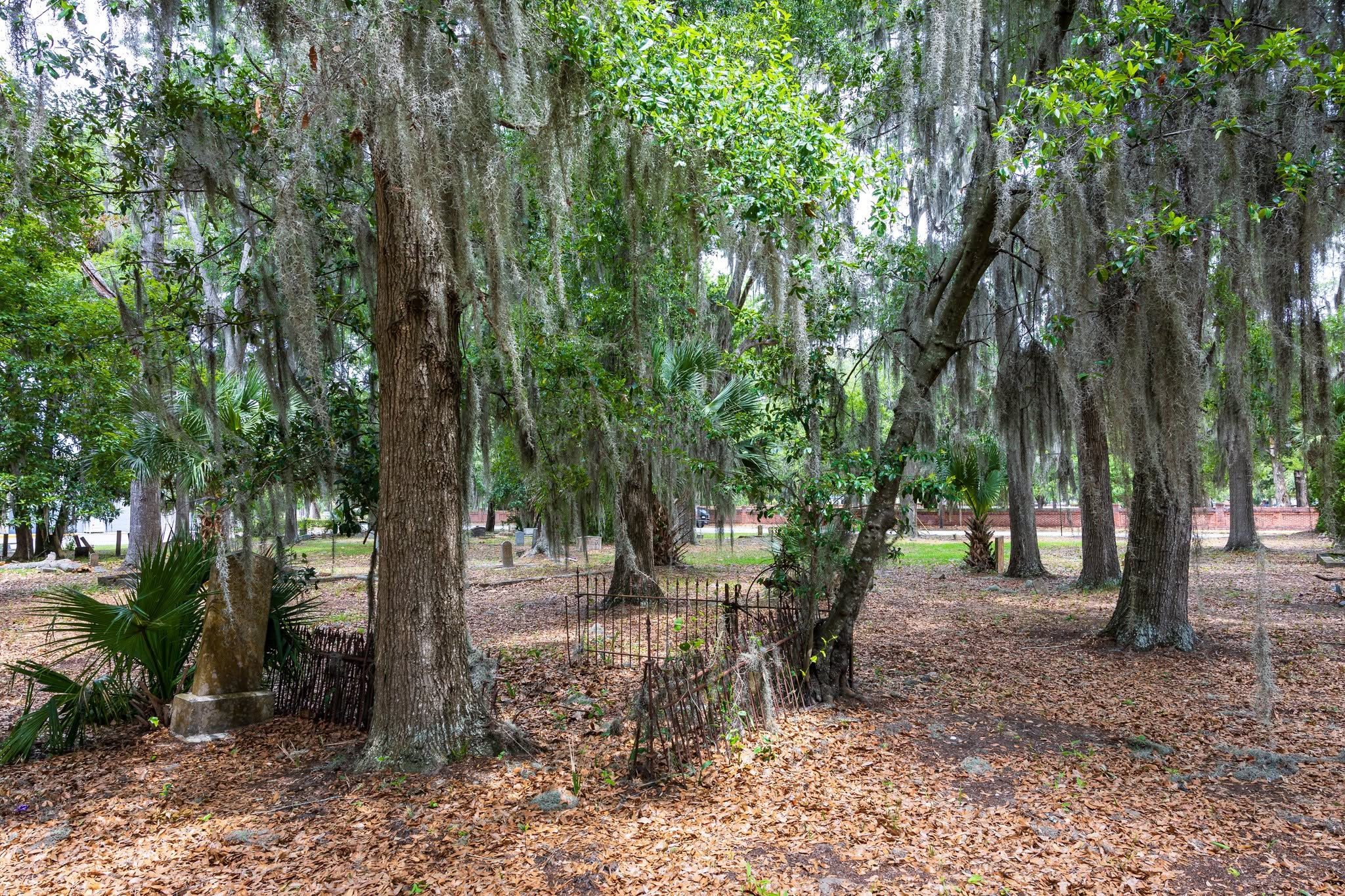
The grave of Percy Washington, Boles's common-law husband, in Citizens Cemetery, the burial ground which John Berendt visited during his research for Midnight in the Garden of Good and Evil.

In 1994, John Berendt changed Boles's name to "Minerva" and included her in his non-fiction book, Midnight in the Garden of Good and Evil. Other than the moniker, and her marriage to Dr. Buzzard, Berendt has said "the story about Boles in the book is true". Minerva was portrayed by Irma P. Hall in Clint Eastwood's 1997 film adaptation. The "garden" in the book's title is Citizens Cemetery in Beaufort. In the film, Savannah's Bonaventure Cemetery was used to represent the "colored cemetery down the road".

A recluse, Boles rarely allowed her photograph to be taken (there were only two known occurrences), much less allow people to touch her, due to her belief that she would become jinxed by a curse. "When you gave her money, she didn't want you to hand it to her," John Berendt said at the time of her death. "You had to put it down on a table or on the floor, because that way you can't 'work' with her hands. If you touch her, you're 'working her hand.'"

Although he appeared in the book, Sonny Seiler, a former attorney from Savannah, Georgia, played Judge Samuel L. White in the film (his own role being filled by Australian actor Jack Thompson). Seiler explained that he would meet with Boles on a bench in Savannah's Monterey Square. "We'd sit out there a few minutes, but she'd never say anything. She didn't trust me." Seiler visited Boles at her home in Beaufort, in 2002. "The house reeked of some strange incense," he said. "I gave her some money, and she smiled. I asked her if she ever got back to Savannah, and she said she didn't. She said she couldn't travel."

Irma P. Hall as Minerva, the character based on Boles, in Midnight in the Garden of Good and Evil (1997)

During the 1980s, Boles often visited Savannah's Forsyth Park, a block south of the Mercer House home of Jim Williams, the main character in Midnight in the Garden of Good and Evil and whom Seiler represented for the final three of Williams' four trials for the shooting of Danny Hansford, for which he was accused of murder. "Jim would give her $20 or something because she’d tell him what was going on in the community, which he valued," explained Seiler. "She was his mole."

According to Berendt, Boles said that she had been in touch with Williams after he died in 1990.

Upon the release of Berendt's book, in January 1994, Boles accompanied the author to Bonaventure Cemetery for a feature for Good Morning America. They visited the graves of William and Anna Aiken, the parents of writer and poet Conrad. William killed himself and his wife in a murder-suicide in 1901, when Aiken was eleven years old.

In 2004, Boles was featured in Life magazine.

== Death ==
Boles died in 2009, at Beaufort Memorial Hospital, aged 76. She was interred in Jerusalem Baptist Church Cemetery in Cummings, South Carolina, along with her father and son.
