= The Ladykillers (2004 film) =

2004 film by Joel and Ethan Coen

- Theatrical release poster
- Directed by: Joel Coen; Ethan Coen
- Written by: Joel Coen; Ethan Coen
- Based on: The Ladykillers by William Rose
- Produced by: Joel Coen; Ethan Coen; Tom Jacobson; Barry Sonnenfeld; Barry Josephson
- Starring: Tom Hanks; Irma P. Hall; Marlon Wayans; J. K. Simmons; Tzi Ma; Ryan Hurst
- Cinematography: Roger Deakins
- Edited by: Roderick Jaynes (Note: Pseudonym for Joel Coen and Ethan Coen)
- Music by: Carter Burwell
- Production companies: Touchstone Pictures; Mike Zoss Productions
- Distributed by: Buena Vista Pictures Distribution
- Release date: March 26, 2004
- Running time: 104 minutes
- Country: United States
- Language: English
- Budget: $35 million
- Box office: $76.7 million

The Ladykillers is a 2004 American black comedy crime thriller film written, directed, produced and edited by Joel and Ethan Coen. The Coens' screenplay was based on the 1955 British Ealing comedy film of the same name, which was written by William Rose. The Coens produced the remake with Tom Jacobson, Barry Sonnenfeld, and Barry Josephson. It stars Tom Hanks, Irma P. Hall, Marlon Wayans, J. K. Simmons, Tzi Ma, and Ryan Hurst, and marks the only time the Coens worked with Tom Hanks and the first remake by the Coens. This was the first film in which Joel and Ethan Coen share both producing and directing credits; previously Joel had always been credited as director and Ethan as producer.

The Ladykillers was released by Buena Vista Pictures Distribution on March 26, 2004. The film received mixed reviews and grossed $76 million worldwide. Many critics consider it one of the Coen brothers' weaker efforts, negatively comparing it to the British classic.

== Plot ==
Mrs. Marva Munson, a strict, religious and elderly widow, meets "Professor" Goldthwaite Higginson Dorr, a classics professor who expresses interest in the room she has for rent and asks to use her root cellar for rehearsals of an early music ensemble he directs, to which she agrees. The fellow musicians in the pretend ensemble are actually a gang of criminals. The band is composed of a dim football player named Lump as the "muscle", the overconfident movie effects technician Garth Pancake as the "jack of all trades" (who has IBS), the crass and sloppy Gawain McSam as their "inside man", and the Vietnamese, tough-as-nails General as their "tunneling expert" (who hides his chain smoking from the disapproving Mrs. Munson by concealing his cigarette in his mouth). The group of criminals plan to dig a tunnel through the exposed wall in the cellar in order to break into the underground vault for a nearby riverboat casino. The dirt they remove is taken out at night and tossed off a bridge onto a garbage barge as it passes below.

A series of mishaps threaten to derail their plan, including "inside man" Gawain losing his janitorial job at the casino, Mrs. Munson's cat Pickles running off with Garth's finger when he accidentally sets a plastic explosive off in his hand, and a visit from the local sheriff. Nonetheless, the group manages to break through the wall of the vault and snatch the loot. Before the group can get away, Mrs. Munson uncovers the plot and tells Dorr to return the money and go with her to church on Sunday, or face the authorities. Dorr attempts to persuade her otherwise, by claiming that the casino's insurance company will replace the money, resulting in each shareholder losing only a single penny. He also claims he will donate a full share of the stolen funds to Bob Jones University, a Bible college which Mrs. Munson admires, but she insists on her judgment.

The gang decides they have no choice but to murder her. None of them are eager to kill an old woman so they draw straws. The task falls to Gawain but he fails to go through with it after he realizes Mrs. Munson reminds him of his mother. This starts a fight between Garth and Gawain which results in Gawain being fatally shot with his own gun; the group dumps his body off the bridge onto the trash barge. Garth then attempts to steal the entire sum of money and escape with his girlfriend, "Mountain Girl," but the General kills them both with a garotte wire and discards their bodies onto the barge. After drawing lots again, the General is about to kill Mrs. Munson in her sleep, concealing his cigarette in his mouth as per usual. He is suddenly startled by a cuckoo clock, accidentally swallowing his cigarette. In a frenzied search for water, The General trips over Mrs. Munson's cat and falls down the stairs to his death. As Lump and Dorr dispose of The General's body onto the barge, Lump has a change of heart and tells Dorr he wants to do what Mrs. Munson says. When Dorr refuses, Lump attempts to shoot him with a revolver but the chamber is empty; he peers down the barrel and accidentally shoots himself with the round that was in the next chamber, falling off the bridge onto the barge. Dorr, now alone, pauses to admire a passing raven and recite poetry until the raven dislodges the head of a crumbling gargoyle on top of the bridge. The head falls, knocking Dorr over the railing, and his cape gets caught on the ironwork and breaks his neck, killing him instantly. As the barge passes under the bridge, the fabric tears and he too falls onto it.

Finding the stolen money in her basement, Mrs. Munson believes that the criminals have fled and left it behind. She informs the police about the money, but they think she is insane and tell her to keep it; she decides to donate it to Bob Jones University. The Ladykillers ends by showing Pickles dropping Garth's severed finger onto the barge.

== Cast ==
- Tom Hanks as Goldthwaite Higginson Dorr, Ph.D
- Irma P. Hall as Marva Munson, a well-meaning, God-fearing elderly widow. She shares her name with the judge in the previous Coen film Intolerable Cruelty.
- Marlon Wayans as Gawain MacSam, the ghetto, lustful, foul-mouthed, hotheaded janitor of the Bandit Queen Casino and the inside man.
- J. K. Simmons as Garth Pancake, a garrulous demolitions expert who suffers from both a receding hairline and an intestinal condition called IBS. He has a female partner, Mountain Girl, whom he once met at an "Irritable Bowel Singles" weekend.
- Tzi Ma as "The General", the often stoic owner of the Hi-Ho Donut store in the town. It is strongly implied that he gained his rank and experience tunneling for the Vietcong, and he is usually silent because he is a foreigner who speaks seldom English.
- Ryan Hurst as Lump Hudson, the brawn of the group and a former football player who "is not very intelligent". He at first refers to Dorr as "Coach".
- Diane Delano as Mountain Girl, Pancake's female partner and right hand gal. She wears braids and dresses in mountain clothing.
- George Wallace as Sheriff Wyner, the lazy sheriff of Saucier.
- Stephen Root as Mr. Gudge, the intolerant but weak-willed manager of the Bandit Queen Casino.
- Jason Weaver as Weemack Funthes, janitor of the Bandit Queen Casino.
- Greg Grunberg as TV commercial director
- Blake Clark as Football Coach
- Aldis Hodge as Doughnut Gangster
- Jeremy Suarez as Li'l Gawain
- Bruce Campbell (uncredited cameo) as Humane Society worker

== Development ==
Tom Jacobson acquired the rights in 1995. At one point the film was to have been directed by Barry Sonnenfeld, the Coens' former cinematographer. The Coens were originally commissioned to write the screenplay only. When Sonnenfeld backed out as director in 2002, the Coens were hired as directors, with Sonnenfeld becoming a producer.

== Production ==
In the sequence where the gang begins to dump the corpses into the river to dispose of them, a garbage barge catches each fallen robber as he falls from the bridge, replacing the goods train used in the original 1955 British film classic.

The gag of the portrait changing expressions is taken from Preston Sturges' film Sullivan's Travels (1941). In an early adventure, Sullivan (Joel McCrea) escapes the advances of a sexually aggressive widow (Almira Sessions) by making a rope out of his bed sheet. The portrait of the late husband is duly shocked. In the original The Ladykillers, a photograph of the late captain "at the salute" is seen. Two of the Coens' previous films, Intolerable Cruelty and O Brother, Where Art Thou?, were also heavily influenced by Sturges.

The garbage barge and garbage island miniatures were produced and developed by New Deal Studios.

=== Filming locations ===
The film was primarily shot in Natchez, Mississippi, USA and Colonial Street, one of the backlot street sets at the Universal Studios Lot in Universal City, California.

== Reception ==
The Ladykillers received mixed reviews. On Rotten Tomatoes, the film has an approval rating of 54% based on reviews from 192 critics, with an average rating of 6.10/10. The site's consensus states: "Hanks' performance in the lead role is inspired, but this is a relatively minor offering from the Coen brothers." On Metacritic the film has a score of 56/100 based on reviews from 40 critics. Audiences surveyed by CinemaScore gave the film a grade C on scale of A to F.

Roger Ebert of the Chicago Sun-Times gave the film two and a half out of four stars, and wrote: "Not content to be funny, it wants to be FUNNY!" He praised Hall's performance as the most successful in the film, but said the other roles "are over-the-top in a way rarely seen outside Looney Tunes."

== Soundtrack ==
Music From the Motion Picture: The Ladykillers

Soundtrack album by various artists
- Released: 23 March 2004
- Genres: Gospel; Hip hop Blues
- Length: 61:50
- Labels: Sony Music Soundtrax; Columbia; DMZ
- Producer: T Bone Burnett

Professional ratings
Review scores
Source	Rating
Allmusic	3.5/5 stars
SoundtrackNet	3/5 stars
Music from the Movies	3/5 stars

While Carter Burwell composed the film score for The Ladykillers, continuing his long-time collaboration with the Coen Brothers, much of the soundtrack is devoted to African American gospel music. The film's executive music producer was T Bone Burnett, who had previously worked with the Coens in sourcing soundtrack music for The Big Lebowski and O Brother, Where Art Thou?.

The soundtrack does not actually contain any pieces of Renaissance music. Similar to his work on O Brother, Burnett chose a mix of vintage songs by Blind Willie Johnson, The Soul Stirrers, Swan Silvertones and Bill Landford & The Landfordaires, along with recordings of contemporary black gospel artists, including Donnie McClurkin, Rose Stone, Bill Maxwell and church choirs, made especially for the film soundtrack. Hip hop songs by Nappy Roots and Little Brother are also featured.

The soundtrack was praised for helping to set the tone of the film, distance it from the 1955 original and complement the contemporary Southern United States setting and gospel music atmosphere.

1. "Come, Let Us Go Back to God" (The Soul Stirrers) – 2:50
2. "Trouble of This World (Coming Home)" (Nappy Roots) – 3:48 (Featuring chorus by Rose Stone, Freddie Stone and Lisa Stone)
3. "Let Your Light Shine on Me" (The Venice Four with Rose Stone and the Abbot Kinney Lighthouse Choir) – 6:43
4. "Another Day, Another Dollar" (Nappy Roots) – 3:48
5. "Jesus I'll Never Forget" (The Soul Stirrers) – 2:36
6. "Trouble in, Trouble Out" (Nappy Roots) – 4:04
7. "Trouble of This World" (Bill Landford & The Landfordaires) – 2:45 (Not featured in film)
8. "Come, Let Us Go Back to God" (Donnie McClurkin) – 4:33
9. "Weeping Mary" (Rosewell Sacred Harp Quartet) – 2:41
10. "Sinners" (Little Brother) – 4:25
11. "Troubled, Lord I'm Troubled" (Bill Landford & The Landfordaires) – 2:58
12. "You Can't Hurry God" (Donnie McClurkin) – 2:26
13. "Any Day Now" (The Soul Stirrers) – 2:28
14. "Trouble of This World" (Rose Stone and the Venice Four and the Abbot Kinney Lighthouse Choir) – 2:55
15. "A Christian's Plea" (Swan Silvertones) – 2:23
16. "Let Your Light Shine on Me" (Blind Willie Johnson) – 3:07
17. "Let the Light from the Lighthouse Shine on Me" (Rose Stone and the Venice Four and the Abbot Kinney Lighthouse Choir) – 1:42
18. "Yes" (The Abbot Kinney Lighthouse Choir featuring Kristle Murden) – 5:29

Additional music

- "Minuet" (3rd movement) from "String Quintet in E, Op. 13 No. 5", composed by Luigi Boccherini; which the gang pretends to play, echoing the original 1955 film.

Credits

- Produced by T Bone Burnett
- Soundtrack executive producers: Joel and Ethan Coen
- Associate gospel music producer: Bill Maxwell
- Associate hip hop music producer: Keefus Ciancia

== Awards ==
The film won the Jury Prize at the 2004 Cannes Film Festival for Irma P. Hall's performance.
