= Irma P. Hall =

American actress (1935–2026)

- Born: Irma Dolores Player Hall; June 3, 1935; Beaumont, Texas, U.S.
- Died: November 10, 2026 (aged 91); Dallas, Texas, U.S.
- Education: Briar Cliff University; Texas College
- Occupation: Actress
- Years active: 1973–2022
- Known for: Josephine Joseph – Soul Food
- Children: 2

Irma Dolores Player Hall (June 3, 1935 − November 10, 2026) was an American actress who appeared in films and television shows from the early 1970s. She often played matriarchal figures in films including A Family Thing, The Ladykillers and Soul Food, in which she portrayed Josephine "Big Mama Joe" Joseph, a role she reprised in the television series of the same name. Hall earned an NAACP Image Award nomination for portraying the character in the film version.

She also appeared in Collateral and two films by director Werner Herzog. For her performance in The Ladykillers, Hall won the Jury Prize at the 2004 Cannes Film Festival, a Black Reel Award, as well as a nomination for a Saturn Award, among numerous other honors.

== Early life ==
Irma Dolores Player Hall was born in Beaumont, Texas, on June 3, 1935, the daughter of Samuel Player, a saxophone player for the Rhumboogie Café, and Josephine Hall, who worked as an admission clerk at a hospital. She and her parents moved to Chicago's South Side in 1942, as Hall's parents wanted their daughter to have better opportunities in education. Hall attended Briar Cliff College in Sioux City, Iowa, but transferred to Texas College, from which she graduated in 1956.

Beginning in 1962, she taught French, Spanish, and other languages at Booker T. Washington High School in Houston, and James Madison High School in Dallas. Hall continued to teach until she began acting full time in 1984.

== Career ==
Hall's first acting role was Georgia Brown in an independent film, Book of Numbers, at the age of 37. Actor/director Raymond St. Jacques hired her as an interim publicist for the film. He saw her performing at a poetry reading and liked her so much that he offered her a role on the spot. St. Jacques opined Hall was a natural and that she should act professionally. She discovered a love for acting, and soon co-founded the Dallas Minority Regional Theater with Reggie Montgomery.

She worked steadily in films and TV throughout the 1980s, and appeared in the films Backdraft (1991) and Mo' Money (1992). However, Hall remained relatively unknown until her role as the loving Aunt T. in 1996's A Family Thing. Multiple critics believed Hall stole every scene she was in. She won the Chicago Film Critics Association Award and the Kansas City Film Critics Circle Award for Best Supporting Actress for her role, and the success of that film helped establish her as a major supporting actress in the late 1990s and early 2000s.

Sizable roles in major films such as Nothing to Lose and Steel followed. Hall then landed the role of Big Mama Joseph in the film Soul Food. A film reviewer claimed Hall was "perfectly cast" in the role of Mama Joseph. For her work in this film, she received the NAACP Image Award for Outstanding Supporting Actress in a Motion Picture in 1998. Soul Food was a hit at the box office, prompting a television spinoff, Soul Food: The Series, in which Hall reprised her role in fantasy sequences. In 2001, Hall received a second NAACP Image Award nomination, in the category of Outstanding Supporting Actress in a Drama Series for playing Mama Joseph.

Also in 1997, she acted in the Clint Eastwood-directed film adaptation of John Berendt's novel Midnight in the Garden of Good and Evil. Her character, root doctor Minerva, was based on Valerie Boles. Hall appeared in the television films A Lesson Before Dying (1999), Something to Sing About (2000), and Miss Lettie and Me (2002). Hall portrayed Glory St. Clair, a psychic nurse, in the short-lived series All Souls.

Hall landed another acclaimed role in the 2004 remake of The Ladykillers as Marva Munson, a religious landlady. A reviewer believed Hall was "outstanding" in the film, while Justin Flowers felt Hall was the funniest actor in an otherwise negative review for the film. She won a special Jury Prize at the 2004 Cannes Film Festival for her performance. Additionally, Hall received an NAACP Image Award nomination as Marva Munson.

She made guest appearances on Law & Order: Special Victims Unit, The Game, and Chicago Fire. Hall portrayed a day care operator in Meet the Browns (2008), also having a minor role in Bad Lieutenant: Port of Call New Orleans (2009). Hall appeared as an employee for a white family in Jayne Mansfield's Car (2012) and recurred as Meemaw in Hap and Leonard in 2017.

== Personal life and death ==
Hall lived in Dallas with her family. She had two children and four grandchildren.

She was a practicing Catholic.

Hall died in Dallas on November 10, 2026, at the age of 91.

=== Car crash ===
Shortly before the 2004 film release of The Ladykillers, Hall was seriously injured in a car crash in Chicago. In the midst of a snowstorm, she lost control of her vehicle, crossed lanes into oncoming traffic, and hit another car head-on. She underwent emergency open-heart surgery for a puncture wound to her aorta caused by a broken rib. In addition, Hall also suffered a shattered ankle and a broken arm. She was cited for driving with a suspended license, and not staying in her lane.

== Filmography ==
=== Film ===
Year	Title	Role	Notes
1973	Book of Numbers	Georgia Brown	
1982	Split Image	Maid	
1986	On Valentine's Day	Aunt Charity	
1987	Square Dance	Preacher Dixon	
1987	They Still Call Me Bruce	Mrs. Brown	
1991	Backdraft	Nurse	
1992	Straight Talk	Ethel	
1992	The Babe	Fanny Baily	
1992	Mo' Money	Lady On Phone	
1996	A Family Thing	Aunt T	Chicago Film Critics Association Award for Best Supporting Actress; Kansas City Film Critics Circle Award for Best Supporting Actress; Nominated - Chicago Film Critics Association Award for Most Promising Actress
1997	Buddy	Emma	
1997	Nothing to Lose	Bertha "Mama" Davidson	
1997	Steel	Grandma Odessa	
1997	Soul Food	Josephine "Mother Joe" Joseph	NAACP Image Award for Outstanding Supporting Actress in a Motion Picture
1997	Midnight in the Garden of Good and Evil	Minerva	
1998	Beloved	Ella	
1998	Patch Adams	Joletta	
1999	A Slipping-Down Life	Clotelia	
2002	Don't Let Go	Hazel	
2002	Bad Company	Mrs. Banks	
2004	The Ladykillers	Marva Munson	Cannes Film Festival - Jury Prize; Women Film Critics Circle Award for Best Comedic Performance; Black Reel Award for Best Actress; Nominated - Saturn Award for Best Supporting Actress; Nominated - NAACP Image Award for Outstanding Actress in a Motion Picture
2004	Collateral	Ida Durocher	
2005	P.N.O.K.	Mildred Burnett	Short film
2005	Gift for the Living	Carrie Mae	Short film
2008	Meet the Browns	Miss Mildred	
2008	Uncross the Stars	Lulu	
2008	Rain	Rosalie	
2009	The Bad Lieutenant: Port of Call New Orleans	Binnie Rogers	
2009	My Son, My Son, What Have Ye Done?	Mrs. Roberts	
2009	Hurricane Season	Grandma Rose	
2011	3 Blind Saints	Sister Louise	
2011	Red	Mother Mabel	Short film
2012	Jayne Mansfield's Car	Dorothy Lambert	
2012	Wolf	Brenda	
2012	Changing the Game	Grandma Barnes	
2012	Hiding in Plain Sight	Ida Mae Blackmon	
2013	Lady Luck	Mrs. Bailey	
2014	Night Vet	Mabel	
2015	Steps of Faith	Dorothy Lee	

=== Television ===
Year	Title	Role	Notes
1978	Dallas	Tilly	Episode: "Bar-B-Que"
1979	Dallas Cowboys Cheerleaders	Dora	TV film
1980	Dallas Cowboys Cheerleaders II	Dora	TV film
1980	Skyward	Mrs. Sinclair	TV film
1981	Crisis at Central High	Lulu Richards	TV film
1981	Broken Promise	Williston	TV film
1984	He's Not Your Son	Nurse Anne Hall	TV film
1984	Dallas	Rosa	Episode: "Shadow of a Doubt"
1985	The Long Hot Summer	Cecilia Howlett	TV film
1986	The George McKenna Story		TV film
1987	Uncle Tom's Cabin	Mammy	TV film
1990	The Kid Who Loved Christmas	Mrs. Smith	TV film
1992	In the Shadow of a Killer	Foreman	TV film
1993	In the Company of Darkness	Apartment Manager	TV film
1993–1994	Missing Persons	Recurring role; Mrs. Davison	Episodes: "I Can't Even Imagine", "Right Neighborhood... Wrong Door", "What Do You Want... A Signed Confession?"
1995	Wishbone	Dr. Thelma Brown	Episode: "Digging Up the Past"
1996	To Sir, with Love II	Old Woman	TV film
1998	The Love Letter	Mae Mullen	TV film
1998	Touched by an Angel	Effie Taylor	Episode: "Seek and Ye Shall Find"
1998	Getting Personal	Mrs. Buckley	Episode: "Guess Who Else Is Coming to Dinner?"
1999	A Lesson Before Dying	Miss Emma	TV film Nominated - Black Reel Award for Best Actress: T.V. Movie/Cable
1999	Judging Amy	Beverly Raymond	Episode: "An Impartial Bias"
2000	7th Heaven	Hattie	Episode: "All By Myself"
2000	Something to Sing About	Memaw	TV film
2000–2002	Soul Food	Mama Joe	Regular role (14 episodes)
2001	A Rugrats Kwanzaa	Great Aunt T (voice)	TV film
2001	A Girl Thing	Alice	TV film
2001	All Souls	Nurse Glory St. Claire	Recurring role (5 episodes); Nominated - NAACP Image Award for Outstanding Supporting Actress in a Drama Series
2002	Our America	June Jones	TV film
2002	The Bernie Mac Show	Aunt Liva	Episodes: "Sweet Home Chicago: Parts 1 & 2"
2002	Miss Lettie and Me	Rose Griffin	TV film CAMIE Award for Best Performance
2003	An Unexpected Love	Mary	TV film
2006	Take 3	Mildred Burnett	TV film
2010–2011	Diary of a Single Mom	Dessa	Recurring role (5 episodes)
2011	Harry's Law	Anna Nicholson	Episode: "Heat of Passion"
2011	Law & Order: Special Victims Unit	Lorna Talcott	Episode: "Reparations"
2012	The Game		Episode: "Grand Opening, Grand Closing"
2012	Chicago Fire	Mrs. Grady	Episode: "One Minute"
2013	Getting On	Cordelia Meade	Episode: "The Concert"
2017	Hap and Leonard	Meemaw	Regular role (6 episodes)

== Awards and nominations ==
- Chicago Film Critics Association Award
  - 1997, Best Supporting Actress: A Family Thing (Won)
- Chicago Film Critics Association Award
  - 1997, Most Promising Actress: A Family Thing (Nominated)
- Kansas City Film Critics Circle Award
  - 1997, Best Supporting Actress: A Family Thing (Winner)
- Image Award
  - 1998, Outstanding Supporting Actress in a Motion Picture: Soul Food (Winner)
- Black Reel Award
  - 2000, Best Actress - T.V. Movie/Cable: A Lesson Before Dying (Nominated)
- Black Reel Award
  - 2001, Outstanding Supporting Actress in a Drama Series: Soul Food (Nominated)
- Cannes Film Festival
  - 2004, Jury Prize for Acting: The Ladykillers (Winner)
- Academy of Science Fiction, Fantasy & Horror Films
  - 2005, Best Supporting Actress: The Ladykillers (Nominated)
- Black Reel Award
  - 2005, Best Actress in a Musical/Comedy: The Ladykillers (Winner)
- Image Award
  - 2005, Outstanding Actress in a Motion Picture: The Ladykillers (Winner)
- MovieGuide Award
  - 2005, Most Inspiring Movie Acting: The Ladykillers (Nominated)
- Women Film Critics Circle Award
  - 2005, Best Comedic Performance: The Ladykillers (Winner)
- Texas Film Award
  - 2005, Texas Film Hall of Fame (Honoree)
- Indie Series Award
  - 2011, Outstanding Guest Appearance: Diary of a Single Mother (Nominated)
