= 2 East Taylor Street =

- Comer House
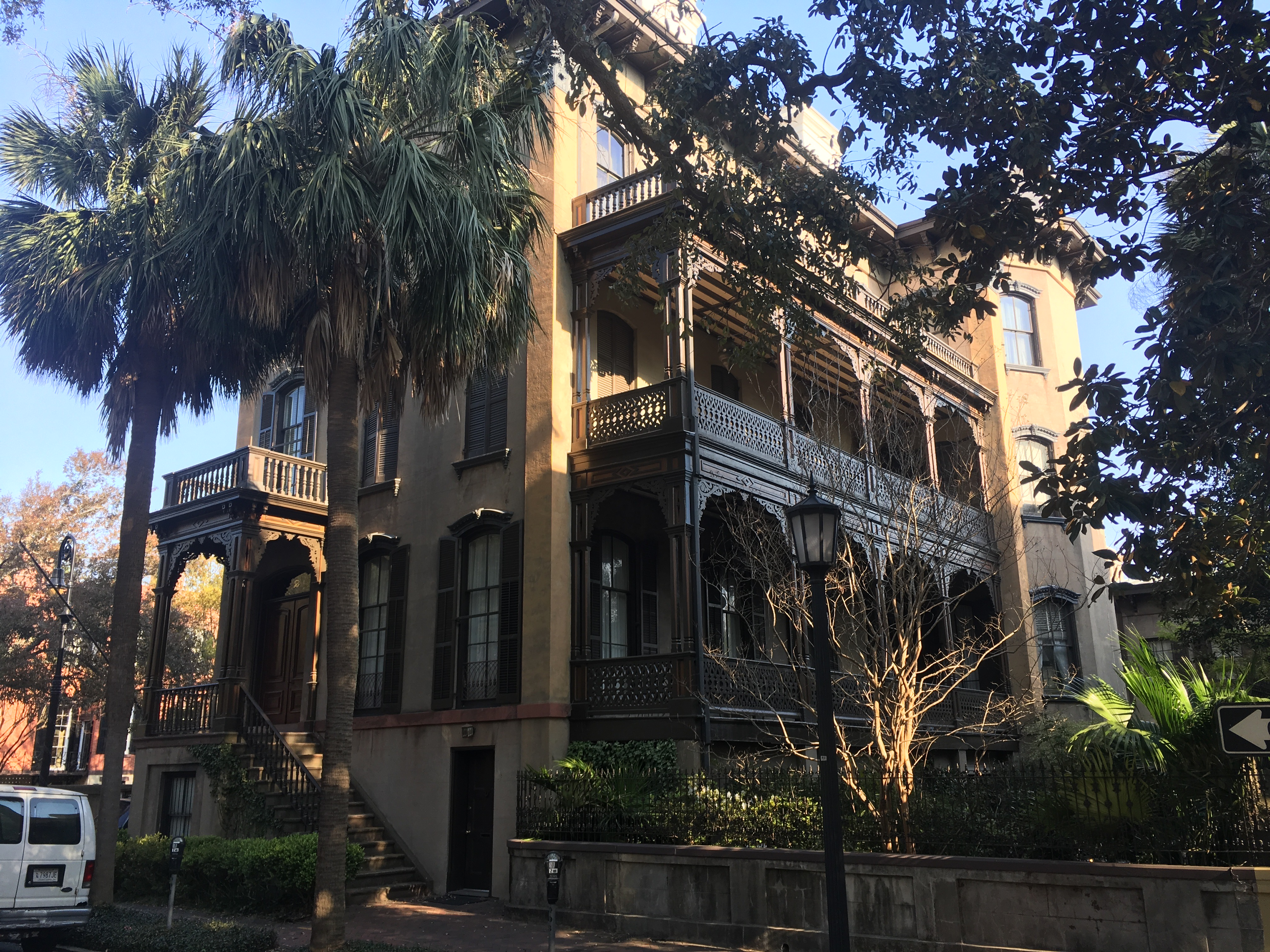
- The building in 2017
- Interactive map of the 2 East Taylor Street area

General information
- Location: Savannah, Georgia, U.S., 2 East Taylor Street
- Coordinates: 32.0718°N 81.0944°W
- Completed: 1880; 146 years ago

Technical details
- Floor count: 4

2 East Taylor Street (also known as the Comer House) is a historic building in Savannah, Georgia, United States. It is located in the northwestern tything block of Monterey Square and was built in 1880. It is part of the Savannah Historic District. It was formerly the home of Hugh Moss Comer (1842–1900), president of Central of Georgia Railway.

Jefferson Davis, president of the Confederacy, was a guest at the house in 1886 with his daughter Varina Anne Davis. The exterior of the house appears in the Clint Eastwood-directed 1997 movie Midnight in the Garden of Good and Evil. John Cusack's character, John Kelso, is welcomed to town by the home's owner from one of its verandas. The gate in the fenced wall that Kelso walks through has since been removed.

== Gallery ==
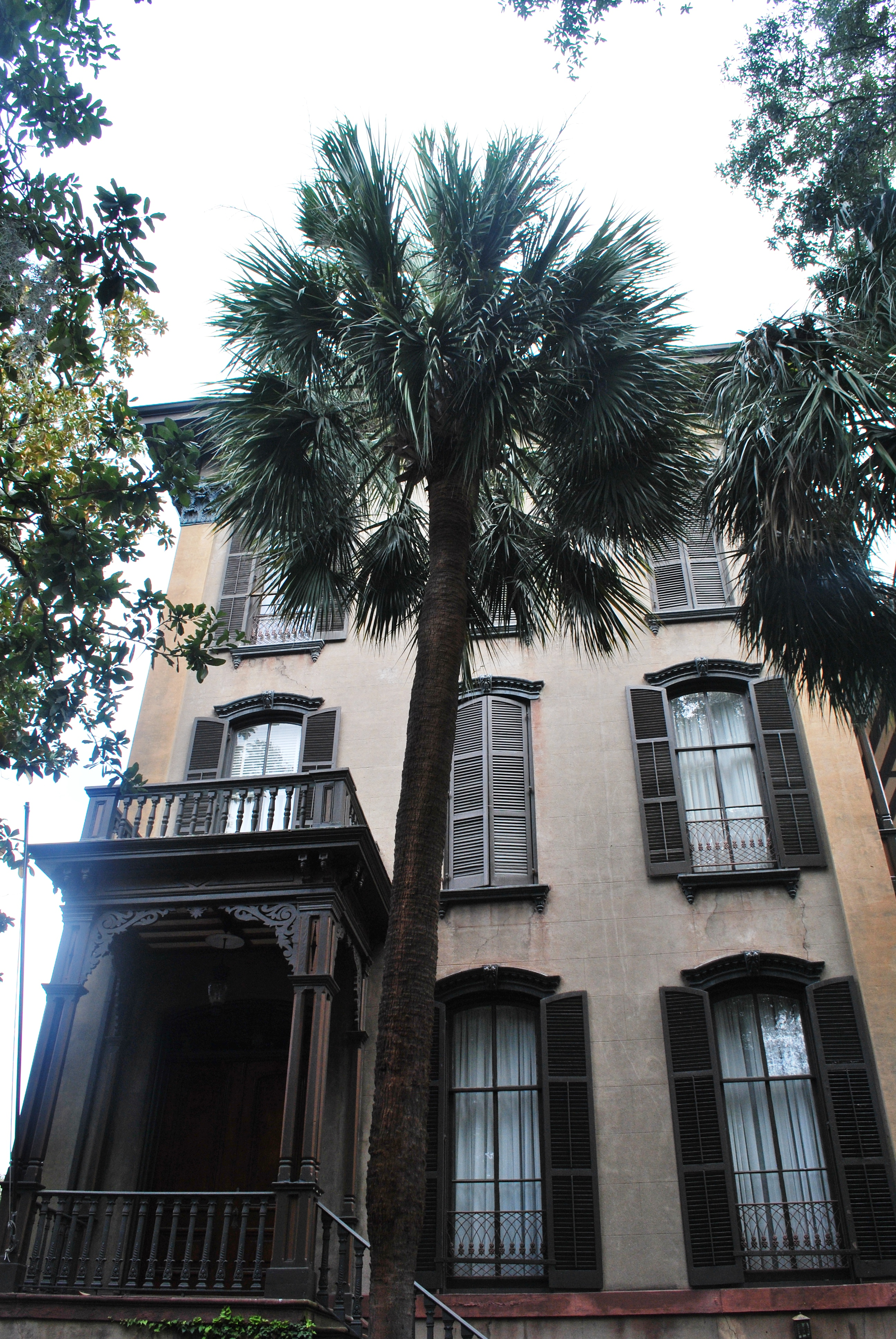
Another 2017 view, of the main entrance

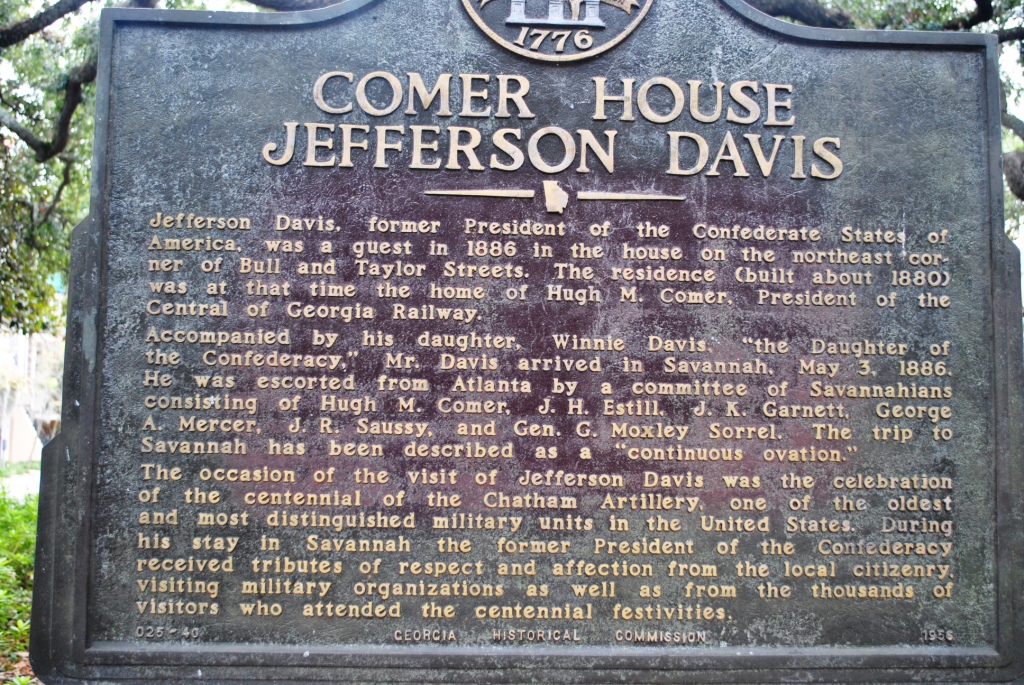
Historic marker

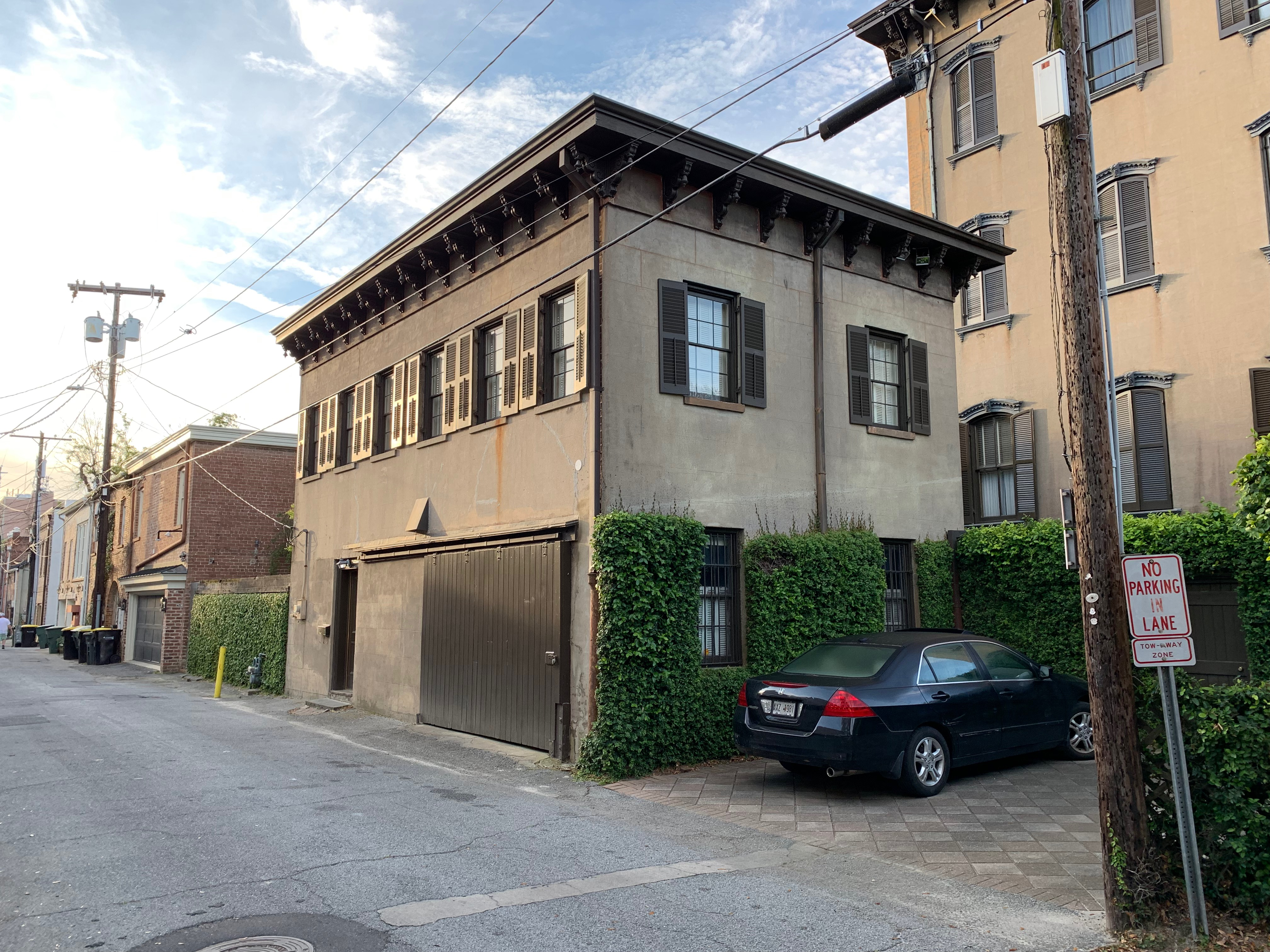
The carriage house, located behind the property on East Jones Lane

== See also ==
- Buildings in Savannah Historic District
