= Midnight in the Garden of Good and Evil (film) =

- Theatrical release poster
- Directed by: Clint Eastwood
- Screenplay by: John Lee Hancock
- Based on: Midnight in the Garden of Good and Evil by John Berendt
- Produced by: Clint Eastwood
- Starring: Kevin Spacey; John Cusack
- Cinematography: Jack N. Green
- Edited by: Joel Cox
- Music by: Lennie Niehaus
- Production companies: Malpaso Productions; Silver Pictures
- Distributed by: Warner Bros.
- Release date: November 21, 1997
- Running time: 155 minutes
- Country: United States
- Language: English
- Budget: $30 million
- Box office: $25.1 million

Midnight in the Garden of Good and Evil is a 1997 American crime drama film directed and produced by Clint Eastwood and starring John Cusack and Kevin Spacey. The screenplay by John Lee Hancock was based on John Berendt's 1994 book of the same name and follows the story of antiques dealer Jim Williams, who was on trial for the killing of a male prostitute who was his lover. The multiple trials depicted in Berendt's book are combined into one trial for the film. John Kelso is introduced as the personification of Berendt.

The on-location scenes were shot in Savannah, Georgia. Several real-life locals appear in the movie, notably in the Christmas party scene at Mercer House, including Williams's sister, Dorothy Kingery, and nieces Susan and Amanda, as well as Georgia senator John R. "Jack" Riley (his wife was played by Mary Alice Hendrix). Filming was permitted inside Mercer House, but action scenes and those in the courtroom were filmed later on a soundstage at Warner Bros.

Three people—The Lady Chablis, Emma Kelly and Jerry Spence—play themselves, while Sonny Seiler, one of Williams's lawyers in the book, plays Judge Samuel L. White. Danny Hansford, the shooting victim in the book, is renamed Billy Hanson in the film and is portrayed by a 24-year-old Jude Law, in one of his early film roles. Midnight in the Garden of Good and Evil was released by Warner Bros. on November 21, 1997. The film received mixed reviews from critics and was a box office bomb, grossing $25.1 million against a $30 million budget.

== Plot ==
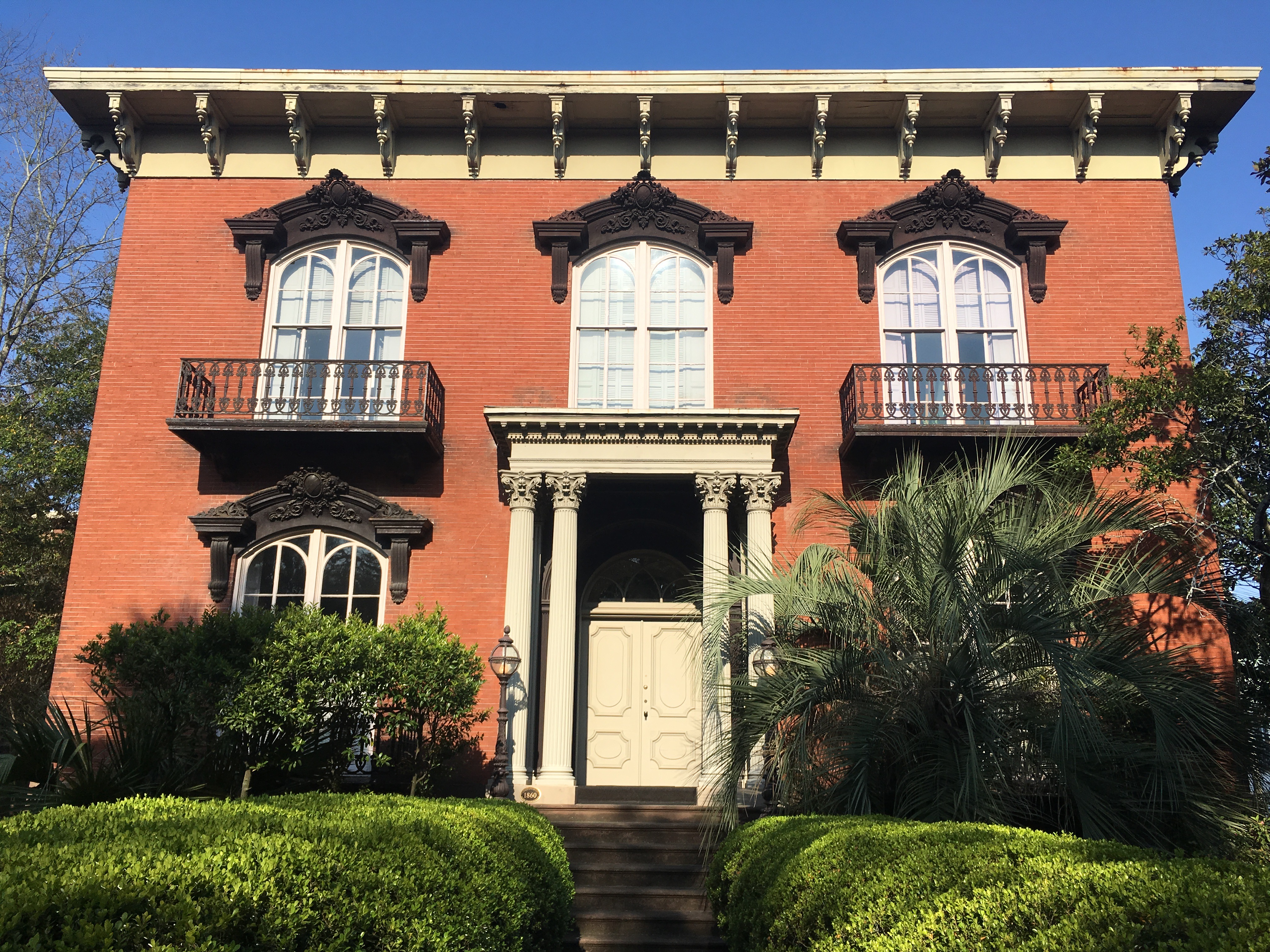
Mercer House. The alleged murder of Billy Hanson occurred in Williams's study – the bottom left room in this photograph. The house is now known as the Mercer Williams House Museum

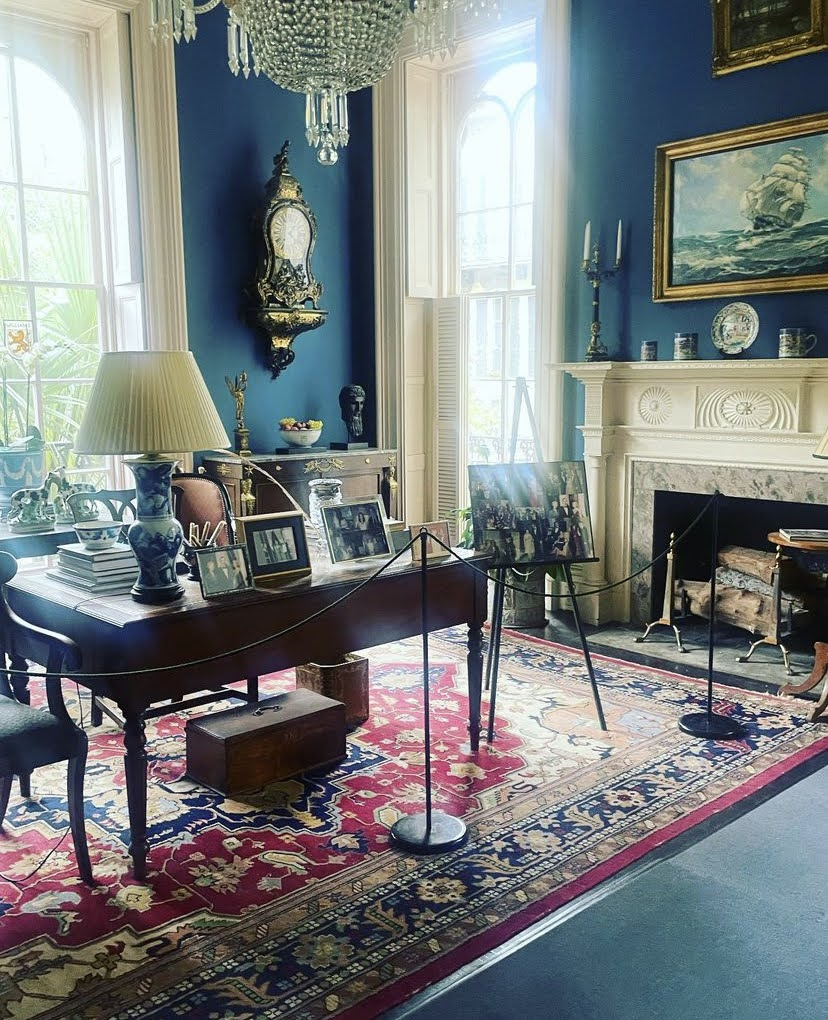
The Mercer House study, where the shooting of Billy Hanson took place

The panoramic tale of Savannah's eccentricities focuses on a deadly shooting and the subsequent trial of Jim Williams, a self-made man, art collector, antiques dealer, bon vivant, and semi-closeted homosexual. John Kelso, a magazine reporter from New York with one book—Before the Fall—to his name, flies to Savannah, amid beautiful architecture and odd doings, to write a feature for Town & Country on one of Williams's acclaimed Christmas parties. Williams's parties, held at his Mercer House home, were the highlight of many people's social calendars. Williams had an "in" box and an "out" box for his invitations, depending on whether or not the person was in Williams's favor at the time.

En route to Savannah's Jones Street, via a tour of the city's tourist hotspots, Kelso alights at Forsyth Park. Making his way to his lodging in Monterey Square, he has a brief interaction with Billy Hanson in front of Mercer House. Kelso does not know who Hanson is, or that Mercer House is Williams's home.

Awoken by Mandy Nicholls, who is looking for some ice to take back to her partner Joe Odom's party, Kelso accompanies her back to the festivities. There, he meets hairdresser Jerry Spence and Odom, who is playing the piano.

Kelso is guest of honor at the Williams's party. During the course of the evening, Kelso meets Emma Kelly, named the "Lady of 6,000 Songs" by Savannah's own Johnny Mercer, Harry Cram, the former silent-film actress Serena Dawes and Williams's mother, Blanche. Williams shows Kelso his organ in the upstairs ballroom. It is there that Billy Hanson appears, having let himself in the servants' entrance. Hanson demands some money from Williams so that he can "get fucked up." Williams refuses, saying Hanson "gets paid on Friday like everyone else." Hanson responds by smashing a bottle and threatening both Williams and Kelso with it, before storming out. After explaining Hanson's situation to Kelso, Williams sits down and plays "Jeepers Creepers" on the organ, demonstrating that he uses it to drown out the sound of his neighbour Lorne Atwell's dog.

After the guests have left, Williams and Kelso wind down with a brandy in the Mercer House library, where Kelso discovers his book in Williams's bookcase. Kelso leaves shortly thereafter, stating he has an early flight home.

Kelso is again awoken, this time by the sound of sirens. He ventures out into Monterey Square to find out what is going on. It transpires that Hanson was shot dead by Williams in the Mercer House study after an argument between the two. Kelso lets himself, and Williams's cat, Sheldon, through the back door into what should have been a secured environment. Williams is being questioned by police in the drawing room. Sonny Seiler arrives a few seconds later and tries to defuse the situation.

Kelso stays on to cover the murder trial for a new book, with the blessing of Williams. Along the way, he meets some characters: the irrepressible The Lady Chablis, a transgender entertainer; Luther Driggers, a man who keeps flies attached to strings on his lapels and threatens daily to poison the water supply; the members of the Married Woman's Card Club; and Minerva, a spiritualist and root doctor, based on real-life Valerie Boles.

Between becoming Williams's friend, a love interest of Mandy (whom he discovers is a torch singer), meeting every eccentric in Savannah, participating in Minerva's midnight graveyard rituals, and helping solve the mysteries surrounding Hanson's death, Kelso has his hands full. Kelso discovers that the bagging of Hanson's hands was performed by a nurse at Candler Hospital, when it should have been done at the crime scene instead. When Williams becomes confident he can win his case on a matter of flawed police procedure, he falsely testifies to killing Hanson with return fire in self-defense. This disappoints Kelso, to whom Williams has confessed he executed Hanson in retaliation for attempting to shoot him with the gun's safety catch on. The judge and jury later find Williams not guilty.

As Kelso is leaving town, when saying goodbye to Williams in the Mercer House study, he asks one last question for the book: Does he want to tell him what really happened? Williams replies, "Truth, like art, is in the eye of the beholder. You believe what you choose, and I'll believe what I know." He watches from the window as Kelso walks away. Minutes later, Williams is stricken by a heart attack and falls face down on the carpet. His heartbeat slows. He imagines Hanson lying alongside him, as he was in death. Their eyes meet, Hanson raises his head, smiles, then resumes his position, lifeless. The heartbeat has stopped. An overhead shot shows the two dead men lying like mirror images, then Hanson fades away. After the funeral, Minerva tells Kelso he knows all he needs to know and warns him not to waste too much time on the dead. “I love you, boy, but I ain’t the only one. You know that, don't you?” Later, Kelso signs a six-month lease on an apartment. To celebrate, he, Mandy and Lady Chablis, who is walking Uga, stroll off together for a picnic. Minerva, who is feeding Flavis, a squirrel, in the park, laughs as they pass. Cut to the cemetery and shots of the two graves. The credits roll over film of the Bird Girl statue in Bonaventure Cemetery, with k.d. lang singing "Skylark", as she does in the movie's opening.

== Cast ==
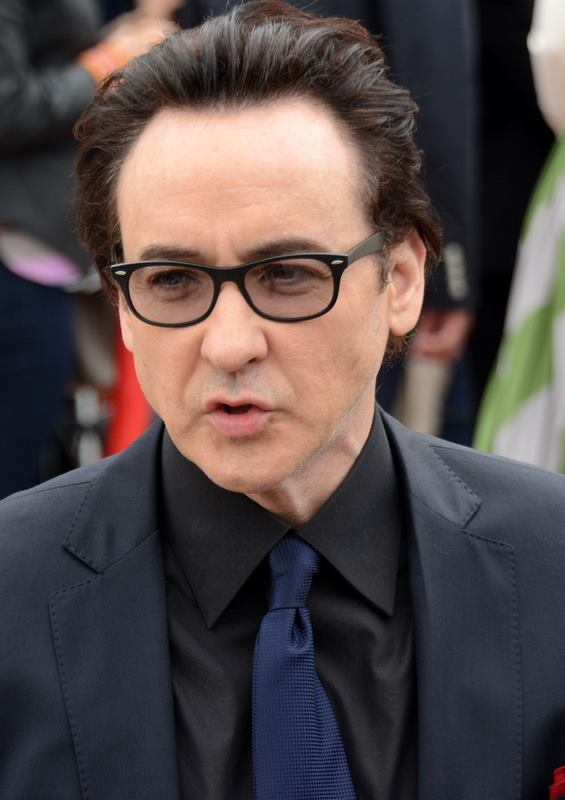
John Cusack played John Kelso, a writer from New York

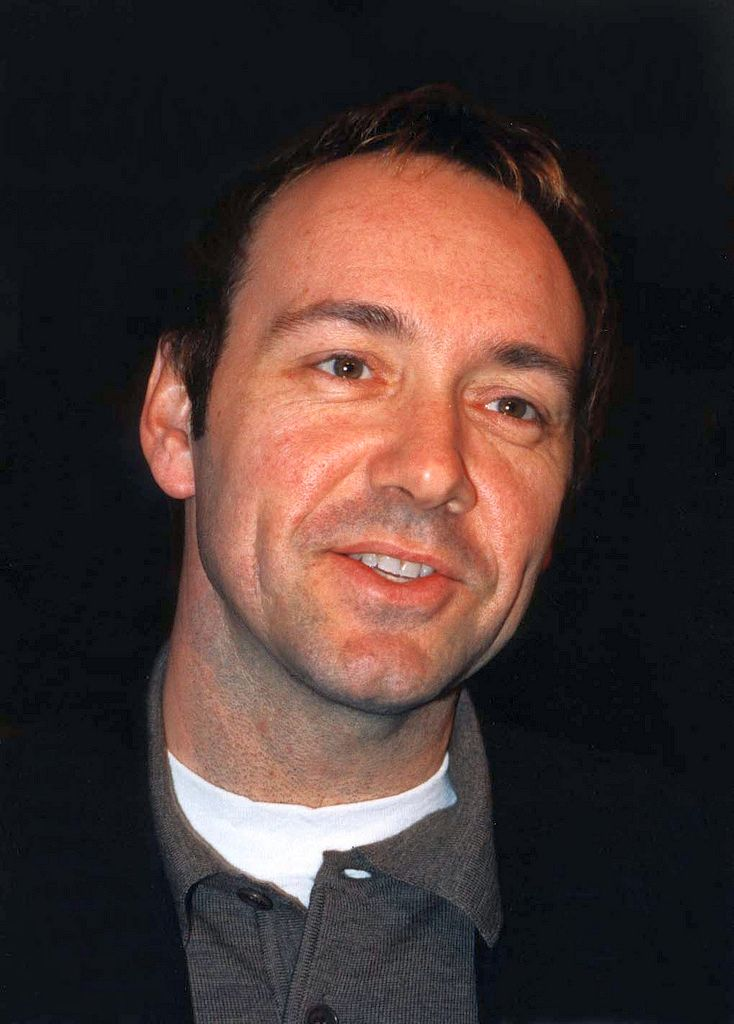
Kevin Spacey appeared as antiques dealer Jim Williams

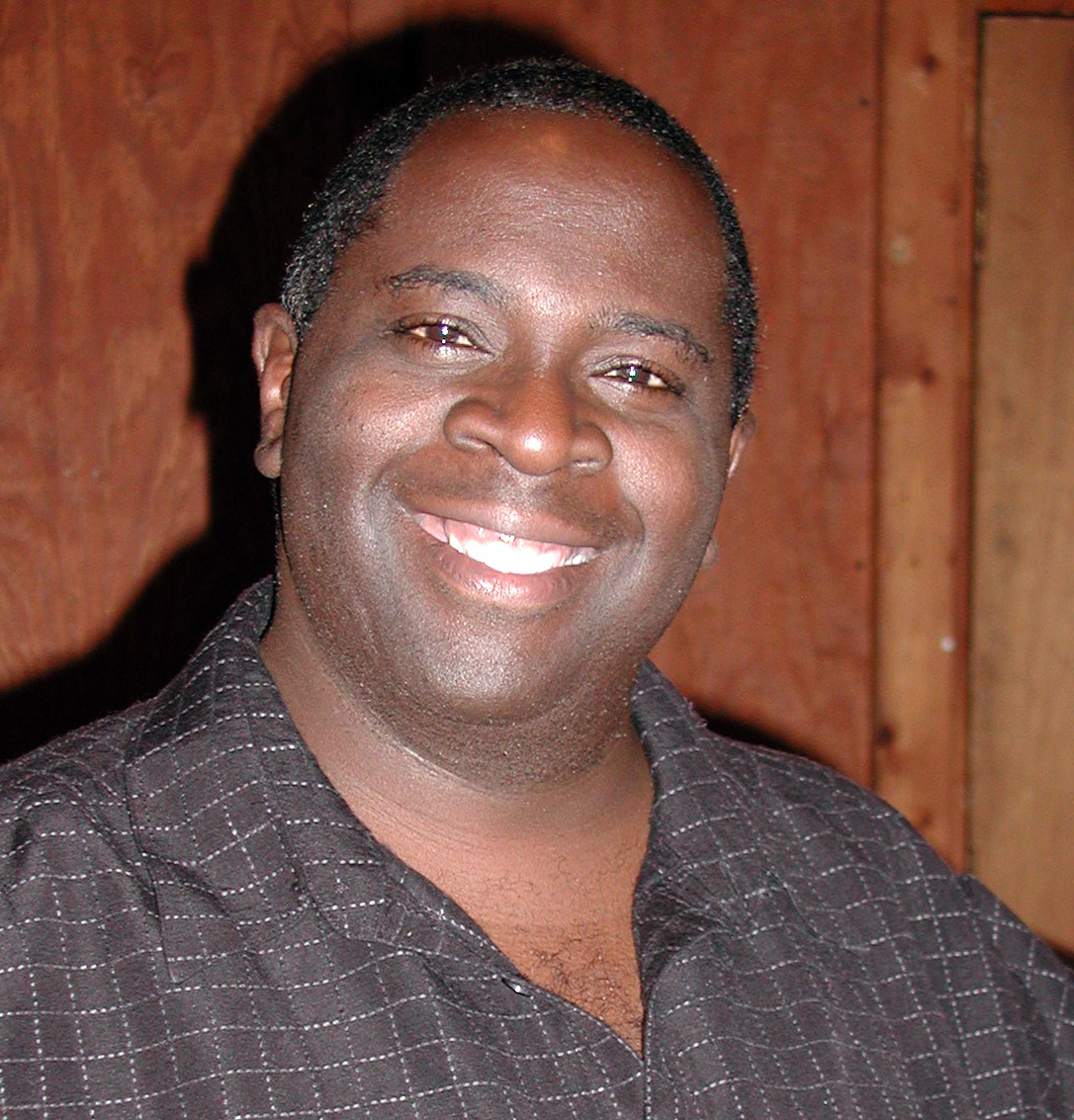
Gary Anthony Williams portrayed the tour-bus driver at the beginning of the film

- John Cusack as John Kelso
- Kevin Spacey as Jim Williams
- Jack Thompson as Sonny Seiler
- Irma P. Hall as Minerva
- Jude Law as Billy Hanson
- Alison Eastwood as Mandy Nicholls
- Paul Hipp as Joe Odom
- The Lady Chablis as Chablis Deveau
- Kim Hunter as Betty Harty
- Geoffrey Lewis as Luther Driggers
- Bob Gunton as Finley Largent
- Richard Herd as Henry Skerridge
- Leon Rippy as Detective Boone
- Sonny Seiler as Judge Samuel L. White
- Dorothy Loudon as Serena Dawes
- Patrika Darbo as Sara Warren
- Michael Rosenbaum as George Tucker
- Jerry Spence as Himself
- James Moody as William Glover
- Georgia Allen as Lucille Wright
- Emma Kelly as Herself
- Géza von Habsburg as Himself

Clint Eastwood permitted The Lady Chablis to ad-lib some of her lines, but had to rein her in on occasion. He gave her the nickname the "one-take wonder". "We kind of hit the script in a roundabout way," confirmed John Cusack. "[During filming] they put me up at the Holiday Inn," explained Chablis in 2011. "So I told Clint: 'Y'all forgot. I am the Doll. I do not stay at the Holiday Inn.' There was not enough room there for my luggage. And Clint apologized. He said, 'I can't believe they did that to you, Doll.' He was so wonderful."

Gary Anthony Williams played the tour-bus driver at the beginning of the movie. He did more than just load the tourists' bags into the bus, however: "They hired me for the job, and for some reason they thought I could a drive a big double-decker bus that was from England," Williams explained in 2021. "With the steering wheel and gas and clutch on the opposite side, I thought I was going to kill a bunch of background actors that day. But Clint Eastwood was so cool. He put me at ease."

== Production ==
"[My character] is based loosely on John [Berendt]," Cusack said in 1997. "John is a very funny, curious, mischievous, smart guy, so I was definitely able to pull those qualities that John actually has and put them into the John Kelso character."

Flavis, the squirrel Minerva talks to on the Forsyth Park bench at the beginning of the movie, was a trained animal.

=== Differences from the book ===
Several changes were made in adapting the film from the book. Many unused characters were eliminated or combined into remaining ones. John Berendt states at the end of his book that all "the characters in this book are real, but it bears mentioning that I have used pseudonyms for a number of them in order to protect their privacy." To create further distance, several character names in the movie are different than in the book.

- John Berendt is removed from the journalistic role; the fictional John Kelso is introduced in his place, and a love interest is added
- Danny Hansford is renamed Billy Hanson
- Betty Harty, who welcomes John Kelso to Savannah, is named Mary Harty in the book
- The Mercer House bachelor party happens the night before the main party in the movie, but is the night after in the book
- The line "Serena, how lovely to see you out of bed" is spoken by Jim Williams in the movie; Colonel James P. Atwood says it in the book
- Lee Adler, the former member of the Telfair Museums board, becomes Lorne Atwell
- George Oliver, the judge in Williams's trial, becomes Samuel L. White
- Spencer Lawton, the district attorney who prosecutes Williams, is renamed Finley Largent
- Greg Kerr, one of those called to witness, becomes George Tucker
- Prentiss Crowe's lines about the deceased being "a good time not yet had by all" are instead spoken by Serena Dawes
- Sonny Clarke, a member of The Oglethorpe Club, says the line, "They're saying he shot the best piece of ass in Savannah" in the book, but it is given to Joe Odom in the movie

The multiple trials were combined into one on-screen trial. Williams's real life attorney, Sonny Seiler, played Samuel L. White, the presiding judge of the trial. Seiler was originally cast as a juror, but Eastwood persuaded him to take on the role of the judge. Eastwood visited Savannah with production designer Henry Bumstead. Seiler explained: "I said, 'I'm not an actor,' and Clint said, 'Of course you are. All lawyers are actors, and you are one of the best. If you do this for me, I won't have to hire a dialect coach.'" Seiler's daughter, Bess Thompson, appears in the movie as the "pretty girl" in Forsyth Park who asks if she can have her picture taken with Uga.

=== Advertising ===
Advertising for the film became a source of controversy when Warner Bros. Pictures used elements of Jack Leigh's famous photograph in the posters without permission, infringing copyright law.

=== Filming locations ===
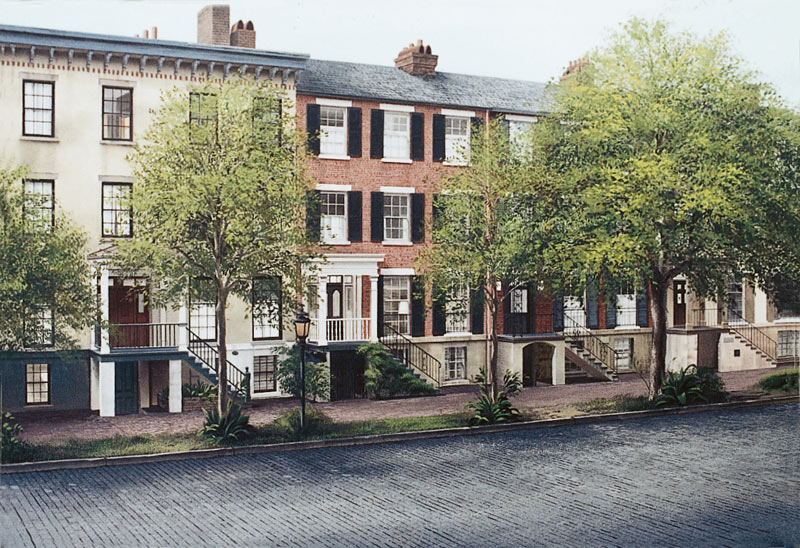
A backing of Jones Street, the work of J. C. Backings, which was made for the movie

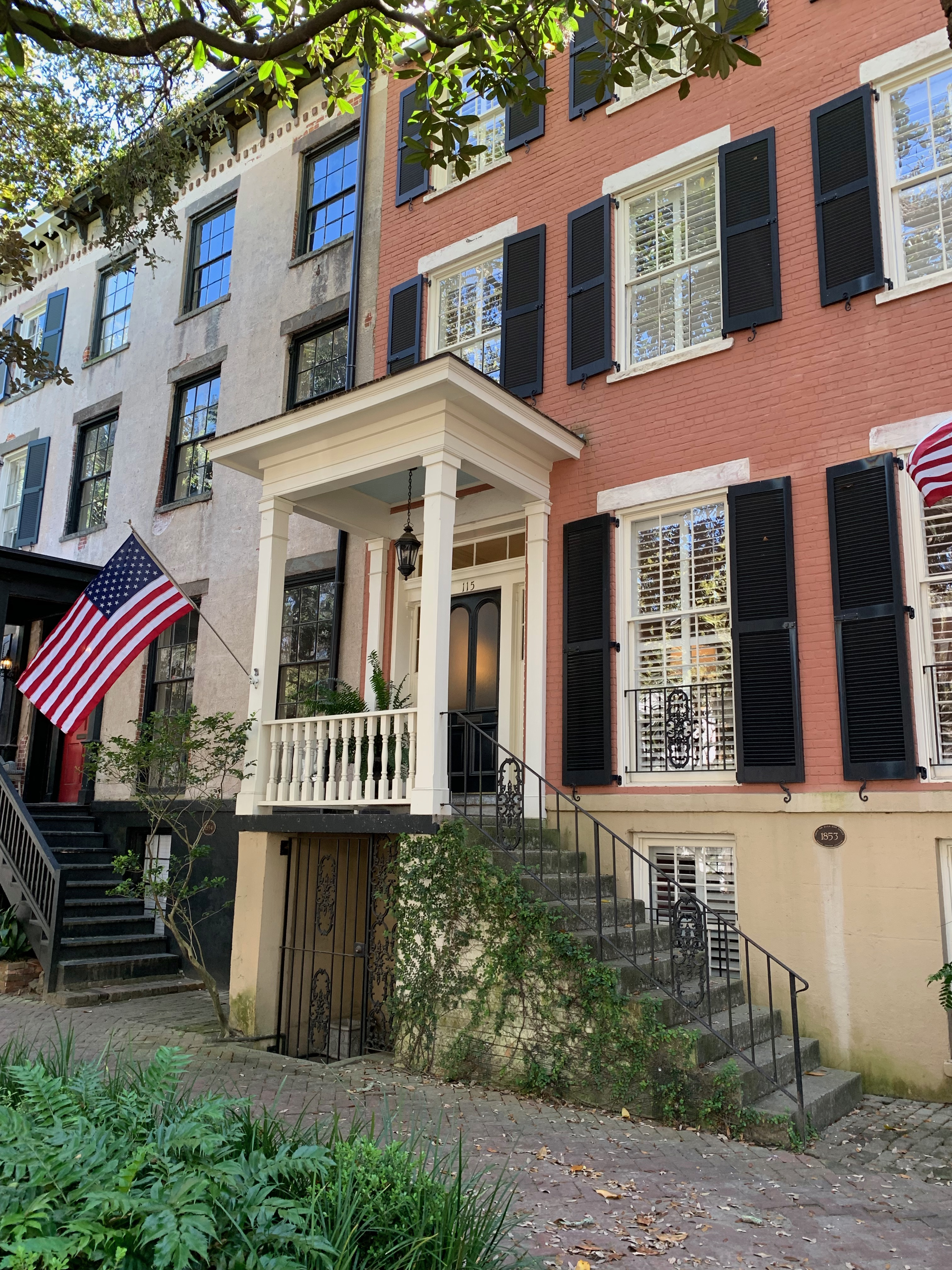
115 East Jones Street, built in 1853, was the venue for Joe Odom's party

While entertaining the role of being the film's director, Clint Eastwood visited Savannah, Georgia, where the majority of the film was shot, in 1996. "I didn't get to know too many people at that time — mostly places — but I did meet some people who knew about the Jim Williams episode. And I met the attorney, Sonny Seiler, who was very, very helpful in making everyone understand what the attitude and atmosphere was in Savannah in the 1980s," he said. Principal photography began in the spring of 1997.

Kevin Spacey also visited Savannah before filming began. He wanted to learn the accent by listening to the locals.

"[John Berendt and I] spoke a lot about the novel and he took us on a tour of Savannah — The John Berendt Tour — which is a great tour of Savannah," John Cusack said in 1997. "We talked about the screenplay. He was very helpful." As for Savannah itself: "I'd definitely go back and hang out. It's a fun place. It's terrific being in a place that isn't interested in being modern. It's not interested in the fast-paced, kinetic lifestyle that we all lead. It's very relaxed; it's got a slow rhythm. All the squares that are in the middle of the town are made so that you can't speed through in traffic; you have to go leisurely around. Cocktail parties and parties are a big deal. It's interested in preserving its past; it's not interested in moving towards the future. It's interested in the way it is. It's very lush and exotic and mysterious."

Several scenes were filmed in and around Monterey Square. Jim Williams's Mercer House is located in the southwestern tything block of the square, at 429 Bull Street. Williams's sister, Dorothy Kingery, became the owner of the house after her brother's death. After initially agreeing to permit filming to take place inside the home, she developed cold feet. "Clint Eastwood came from California the next day," Kingery said. "We talked about my concerns, and he addressed those." While most of the scenes were filmed inside the home, the fight and shooting scenes were done in a California studio. When it came to the Christmas party scenes, the house contained so many valuable pieces of art and furniture that it presented a security problem. Eastwood, therefore, decided not to use extras. He instead sent out engraved invitations to the same locals that Williams used to invite to his parties. The Mercer House hallway and office were recreated in Hollywood.

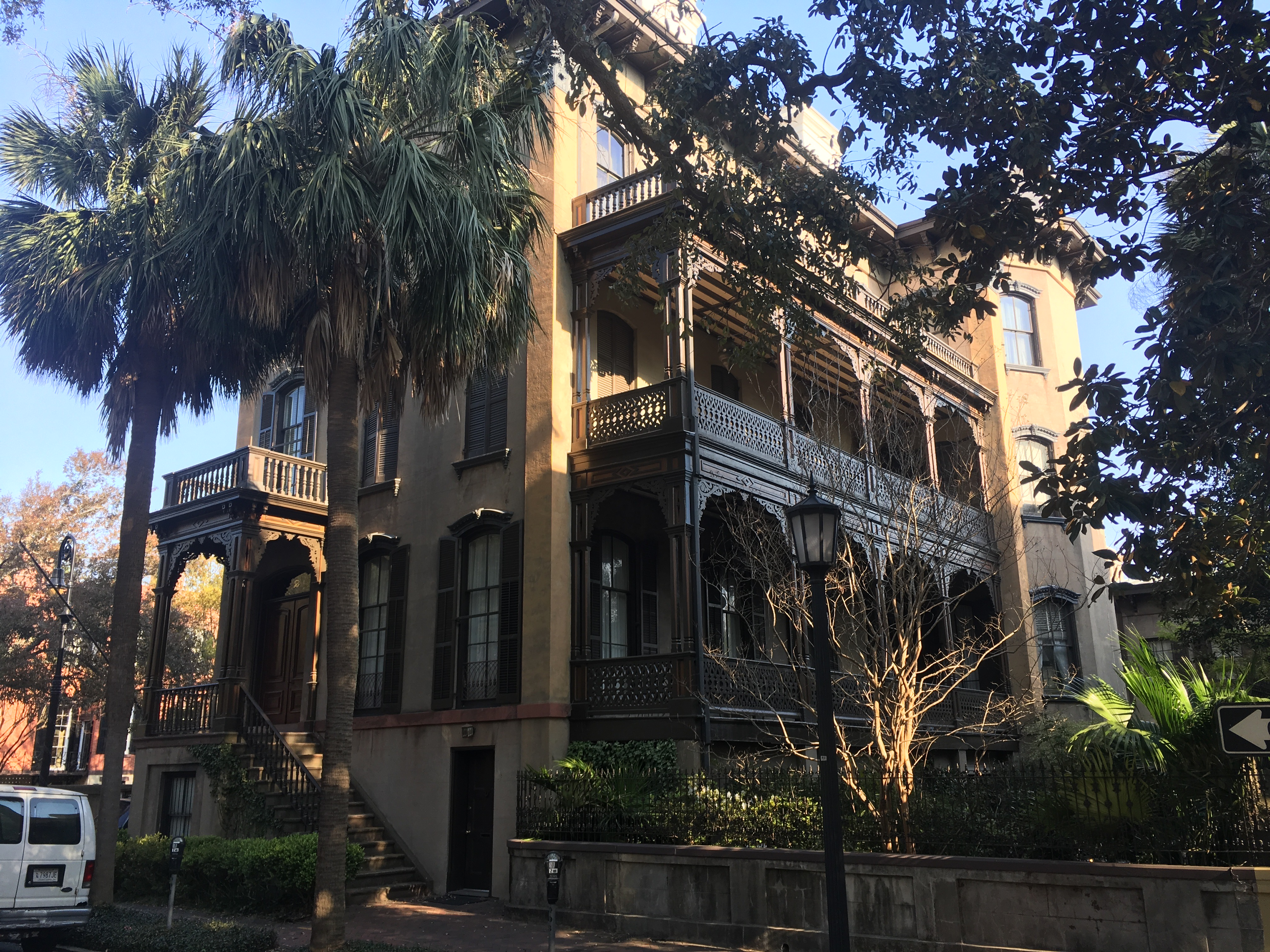
The Hugh Comer House, where John Kelso is greeted upon his arrival in Savannah. The gate in the fence that Kelso walks through has since been removed

John Kelso is shown being welcomed by Mrs. Baxter to the Italianate house at 2 East Taylor Street — the 1880-built former home of Hugh Comer (1842–1900), president of Central of Georgia Railroad, on the square's northeastern ward. Kelso does not stay there in the movie, however; his carriage-house apartment was built on a soundstage in Burbank, California, with backdrops outside his windows provided by J. C. Backings. Establishing window shots from inside the carriage house were filmed across from 115 East Jones Street, which Joe Odom was looking after for its owner, who was in New York. (Odom's house, constructed by Eliza Jewett in 1847, was at 16 East Jones Street.) Kelso's six-month rental, shown at the end of the film, is 218 West Jones Street, which is now valued at over $1.15 million.

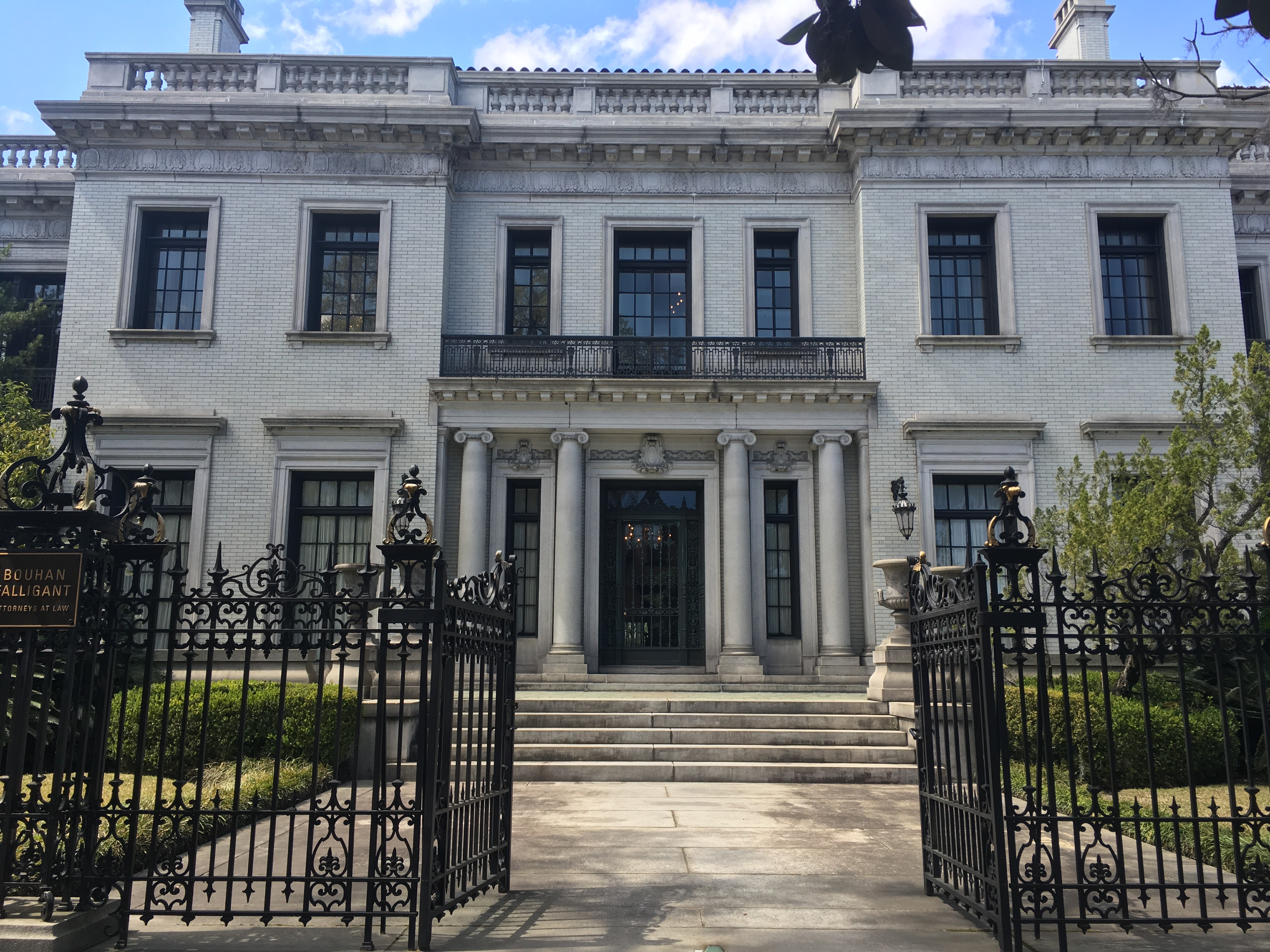
Armstrong House, the former home of Bouhan Falligant LLP. The firm moved to One West Park Avenue in 2017

The scenes at Sonny Seiler's offices were filmed at the Armstrong House, 447 Bull Street, south of Monterey Square and close to the northern edge of Forsyth Park. John Bouhan was one of the partners of Bouhan, Williams & Levy, which moved into Armstrong House in 1970. Bouhan died the following year, but his dog, Patrick, was taken for daily walks by the law firm's porter, William Glover (James Moody), long after Bouhan's death. In 2017, Bouhan Falligant LLP moved to One West Park Avenue after developer Richard C. Kessler bought Armstrong House. Seiler retired just before the move.

The courthouse exterior seen in the movie is the Tomochichi Federal Building and United States Courthouse, in the western trust lot of Wright Square; however, internal shots were filmed in Burbank. Dixie's Flowers, the flower shop Mandy works at, is in the northeastern tything lot of the square, at 6 East State Street.

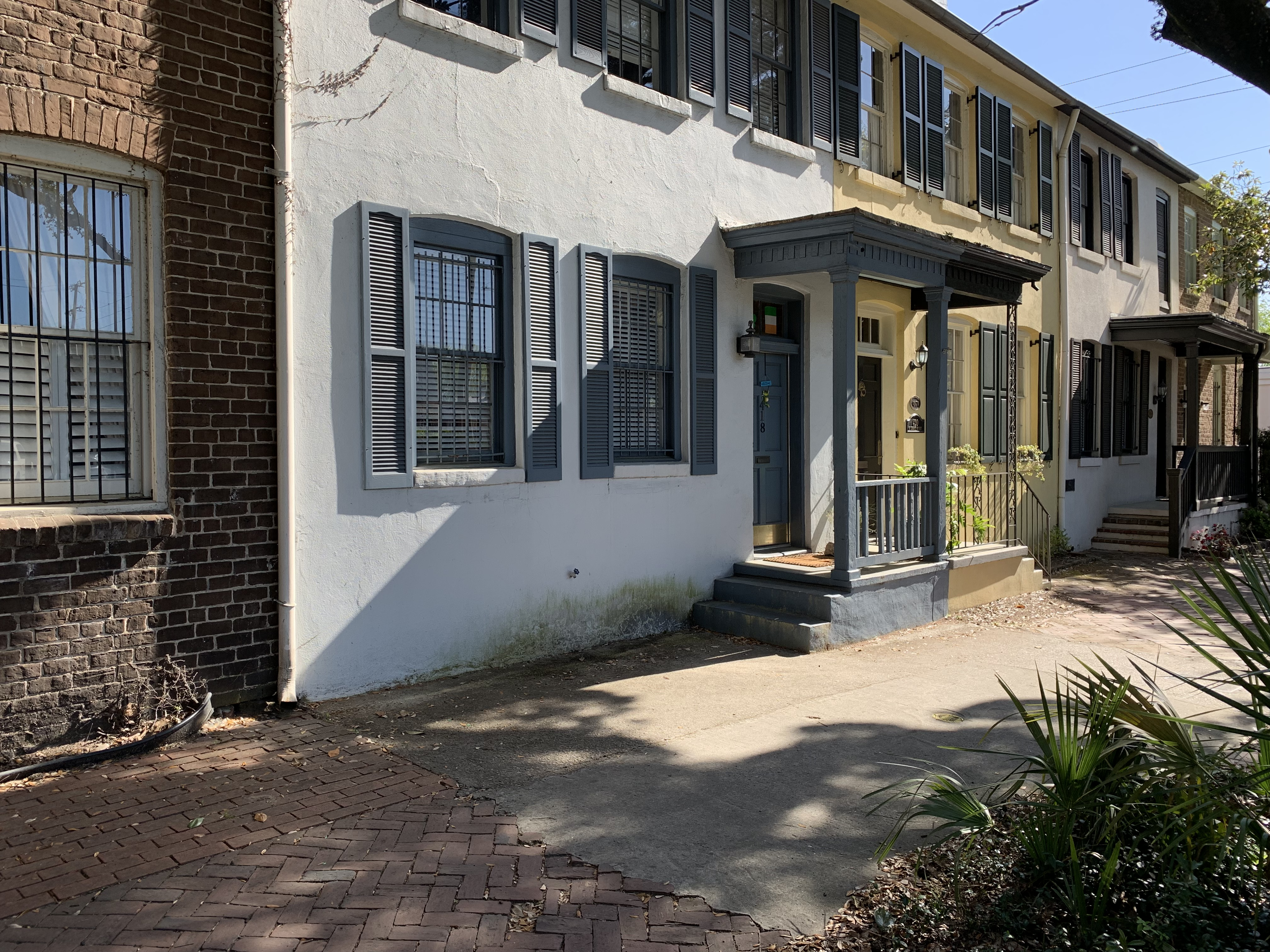
This apartment, at 418 East Liberty Street, doubled as the home of The Lady Chablis

The residence used as The Lady Chablis's home is 418 East Liberty Street. The Myra Bishop Family Clinic she walks to is at 311 Habersham Street, about 500 feet away. In the book, it is opposite Berendt's apartment at Forsyth Parkside. Myra's real last name is Pope.

Kelso has breakfast (and an evening coffee with Mandy) at Clary's Cafe, at 404 Abercorn Street. Photos of the cast taken during down time from filming are hung by the door to the diner.

The Married Woman's Card Club is at 126 East Gaston Street, now known as Granite Hall and part of SCAD.

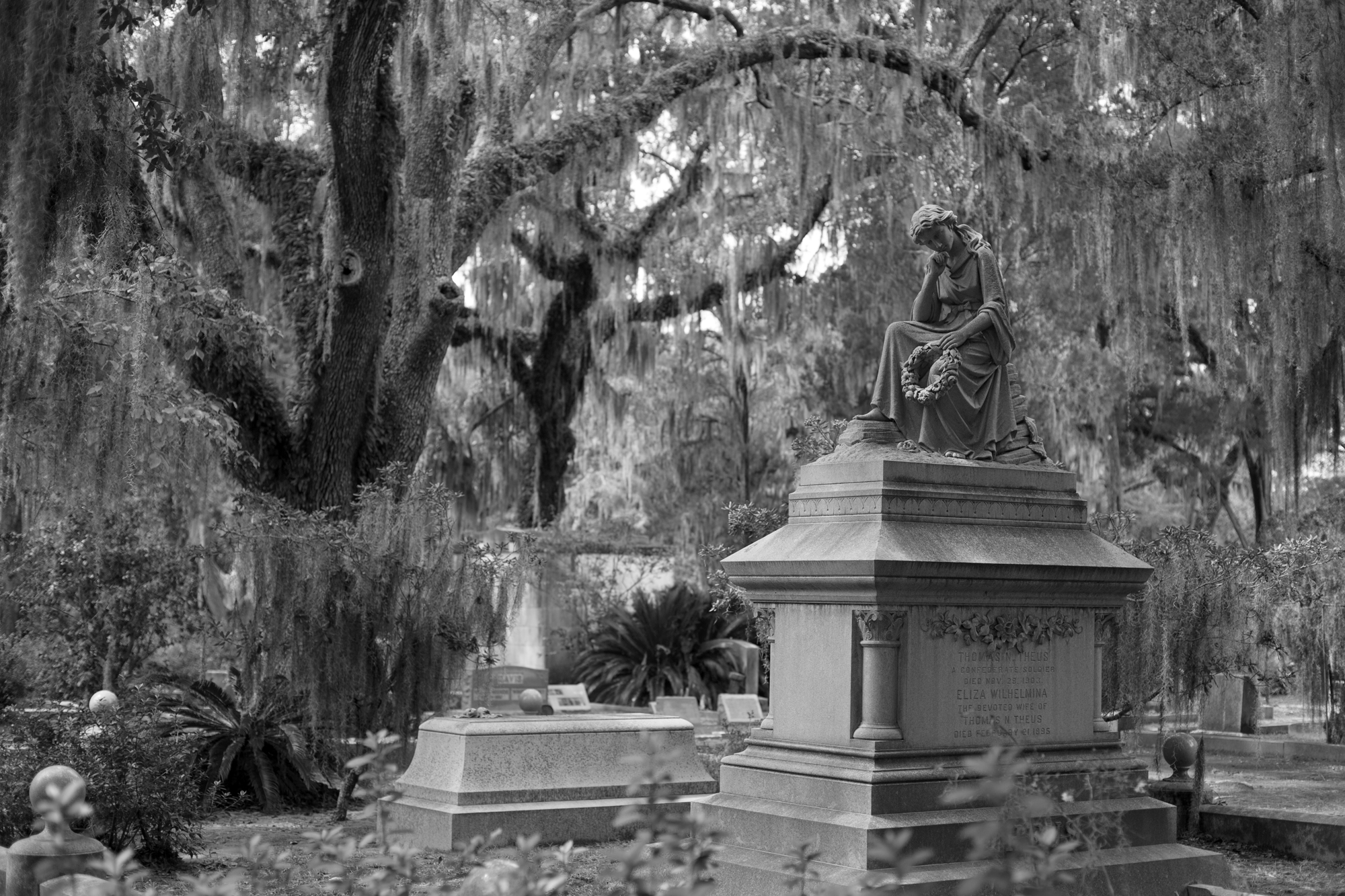
Bonaventure Cemetery

Churchill's Pub was located at 9 Drayton Street at the time of filming, but it was damaged in a fire six years later and closed.

The Debutante Ball was filmed at the Savannah Inn and Country Club. (It later became Wilmington Island Club but was renamed back to Savannah Inn and Country Club in 2018.)

Bonaventure Cemetery, on the city's eastern edge, is featured on several occasions, including for the funeral service of Jim Williams which was shot near Johnny Mercer's burial site. Minerva performs her mysterious incantations at the "colored cemetery" just beyond Bonaventure in the movie. (In the book, the cemetery is Citizens Cemetery in Beaufort, South Carolina, within walking distance of Minerva's home. Also, Dr. Eagle, the common-law husband of Valerie Boles, the inspiration for Minerva, is renamed Dr. Buzzard.)

Forsyth Park is the venue for the dog-walking scenes, including the cameo appearance of Uga V, the English bulldog live mascot of the University of Georgia, playing his father, Uga IV. Uga V died two years after filming. The Uga mascots live in Savannah between football games.

Candler Hospital is erroneously pronounced Chandler Hospital throughout the film.

After location filming ended in June 1997, a fundraiser was held at and for Savannah's Lucas Theatre, which was built in 1921. Spacey donated $200,000 in Williams's honor to assist in the $7.6-million renovation of the theatre. "I love Savannah. I had a great time here," said Spacey, an Oscar winner in 1996 for his role in The Usual Suspects. "I plan to visit again. And once this (theater) gets done, I'll bring a play here." It was hoped that the movie's premiere would take place at the Lucas, but it was instead held on November 17 at Warner Bros. Studios in Burbank. Its Savannah premiere occurred on November 20 at the Johnny Mercer Theater. It opened nationwide the following day. While the Savannah premiere was in progress, Dorothy Kingery was holding a private party at Mercer House.

== Soundtrack ==
Midnight in the Garden of Good and Evil

Soundtrack album by Various Artists
- Released: November 18, 1997
- Length: 58:04
- Label: Warner Bros.
- Producer: Ernie Altschuler

Soundtrack
Review scores
Source	Rating
Allmusic	link

The soundtrack for the film was released in 1997. It is also dedicated to Johnny Mercer. The CD includes versions of songs heard in the film.

No.	Title	Writer(s)	Performer	Length
1.	"Skylark"	Hoagy Carmichael, Johnny Mercer	k.d. lang	3:46
2.	"Too Marvelous for Words"	Richard Whiting, Mercer	Joe Williams	3:40
3.	"Autumn Leaves"	Joseph Kosma, Jacques Prévert, Mercer	Paula Cole	7:24
4.	"Fools Rush In (Where Angels Fear to Tread)"	Rube Bloom, Mercer	Rosemary Clooney	4:10
5.	"Dream"	Mercer	Brad Mehldau	5:10
6.	"Days of Wine and Roses"	Henry Mancini, Mercer	Cassandra Wilson	4:47
7.	"That Old Black Magic"	Harold Arlen, Mercer	Kevin Spacey	3:33
8.	"Come Rain or Come Shine"	Arlen, Mercer	Alison Eastwood	4:32
9.	"Ac-Cent-Tchu-Ate the Positive"	Arlen, Mercer	Clint Eastwood	3:35
10.	"This Time the Dream's on Me"	Arlen, Mercer	Alison Krauss	3:46
11.	"Laura"	David Raksin, Mercer	Kevin Mahogany	4:49
12.	"Midnight Sun"	Lionel Hampton, Sonny Burke, Mercer	Diana Krall	4:01
13.	"I'm an Old Cowhand (From the Rio Grande)"	Mercer	Joshua Redman	4:59
14.	"I Wanna Be Around"	Sadie Vimmerstedt, Mercer	Tony Bennett	2:10

== Reception ==
Midnight in the Garden of Good and Evil was a box office failure, grossing $25.1 million to an estimated $30 million budget. It received mixed reviews. It scores 51% on review aggregator Rotten Tomatoes, based on 39 reviews with an average rating of 6/10. The site's consensus states: "Clint Eastwood's spare directorial style proves an ill fit for this Southern potboiler, which dutifully trudges through its mystery while remaining disinterested in the cultural flourishes that gave its source material its sense of intrigue." On Metacritic, the film has a weighted average score of 57 out of 100, based on 23 critics, indicating "mixed or average reviews". Audiences polled by CinemaScore gave the film an average grade of "C+" on an A+ to F scale.

"Kevin Spacey played Jim Williams -- badly," John Berendt said in a 2015 interview. "He didn't even come close. I had offered [Spacey] recordings so he could listen to Jim Williams talking to me, regaling me with stories while sitting in his living room in Mercer House. [Spacey] said he'd already heard Williams on tape talking during one of his trials. But when I saw the movie, I was perplexed by the way Spacey portrayed Williams, because he did it as if he were asleep. He talked as if he were in a fog or sleepwalking. Then I realized what had happened, and I thought it was hilariously funny." Berendt believes Spacey listened to tapes of Williams during the third trial, when he had taken Valium.

== Bibliography ==
- Hughes, Howard (2009). Aim for the Heart. London, UK: I.B. Tauris. ISBN 978-1-84511-902-7.
