= Midnight in the Garden of Good and Evil =

1994 non-fiction book by John Berendt

- The book's cover, which features the Bird Girl sculpture.
- Author: John Berendt
- Language: English
- Genre: Non-fiction novel
- Publisher: Random House
- Publication date: January 10, 1994 (32 years ago)
- Publication place: United States
- Media type: Print (hardback and paperback)
- Pages: 389
- ISBN: 0-679-42922-0
- OCLC: 27975809
- Dewey Decimal: 975.8/724 20
- LC Class: F294.S2 B48 1994

Midnight in the Garden of Good and Evil is a non-fiction novel by John Berendt. The book, Berendt's first, was published on January 10, 1994, and follows the story of Jim Williams, an antiques dealer on trial for the alleged murder of Danny Hansford. Subtitled A Savannah Story, with an initial printing of 25,000 copies, the book became a New York Times Best-Seller for 216 weeks following its debut, and remains one of the longest-standing New York Times Best-Sellers.

Berendt combined self-witnessed experiences during his time living in Savannah, Georgia (roughly four years after the shooting), with stories from the preceding years recounted to him by locals; he catches up with proceedings around the book's mid-point. Williams was a free man during Berendt's five years in Savannah. The author took some liberties with his writing, including creating a relationship between Joe Odom (a homosexual) and Nancy Hillis.

The character Serena Dawes was based on silent-film actress and heiress Helen Avis Drexel, while voodoo priestess Valerie Boles was the inspiration for Minerva.

The book was adapted for Clint Eastwood's 1997 film, with several characters' names changed to protect their privacy. Maybe to "protect the innocent," said Sonny Seiler, Williams's attorney, who played the judge in the film. "Well, I don't know how innocent they were, but he didn't change any of the facts." John Lee Hancock wrote the screenplay.

Berendt dedicated "the book", as it became known to Savannahians, to his parents.

== Background ==
Berendt gave the finished manuscript to his agent, Lynn Nesbit, who enjoyed it but said it was "too local" and that no publisher would take a chance on it. She gave the manuscript back to Berendt, who found Suzanne Gluck, another agent. Within a week, she had four major publishers bidding for it. Random House was the successful bidder. Midnight in the Garden of Good and Evil was published in January 1994, fourteen months after Berendt finished writing it. The publisher did not change a word of the manuscript.

In tone, the book is atmospherically Deep South coastal (Savannah, Georgia, and Beaufort, South Carolina) and Southern Gothic, depicting a wide range of eccentric personalities in and around Savannah.

The central narrative concerns the shooting of Danny Hansford, a local male prostitute, characterized as "a good time not yet had by all" by Prentiss Crowe, a Savannah socialite. The perpetrator was respected antiques dealer Jim Williams, who was also Hansford's employer and casual sexual partner. Hansford's death resulted in four murder trials, with the final one ending in acquittal, after the judge finally agreed to a change of venue to move the case away from the Savannah jury pool. The book describes Williams's version of the killing, which is that it was in "self-defense"—the result of Hansford, who was prone to fits of rage, shooting at Williams with a gun that was on display, and Williams shooting back to protect himself—and not murder, pre-meditated or otherwise, by Williams. The shooting occurred in Williams's Mercer House home, the ground floor of which is now a museum.

The book highlights many other notable Savannah residents, including The Lady Chablis, a local transgender woman, club performer and entertainer. Chablis provides both a Greek chorus of sorts as well as a light-hearted contrast to the more serious action. Chablis was given a dedicated chapter, as was Emma Kelly, the "Lady of 6,000 Songs."

== Characters and events ==
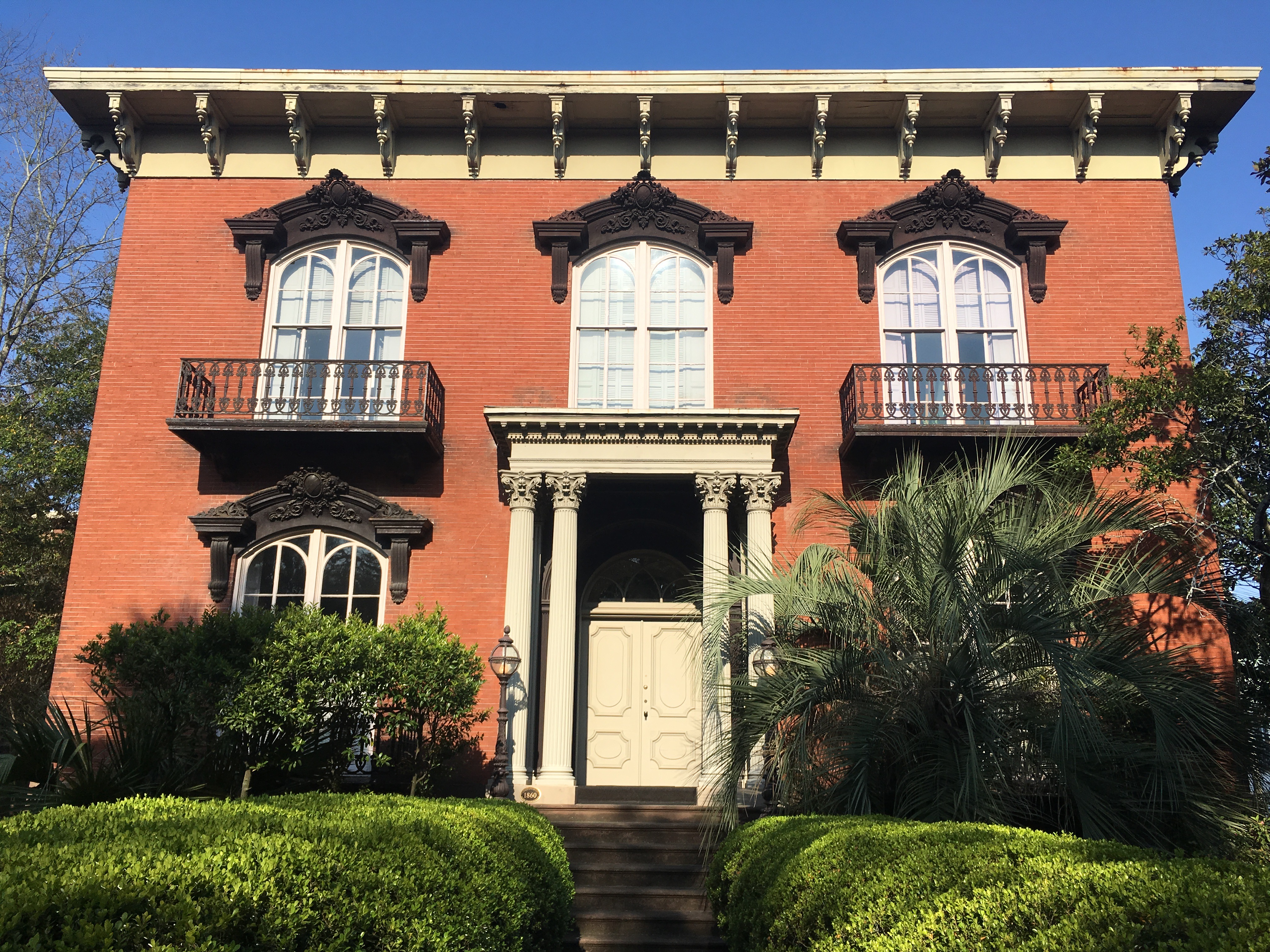
Mercer House. The alleged murder of Danny Hansford occurred in Williams's study – the bottom left room in this photograph. The house is now known as the Mercer Williams House Museum

The book's plot is based on real-life events that occurred in the 1980s and is classified as non-fiction. Because it reads like a novel (and rearranges the sequence of true events in time), it is sometimes referred to as a "non-fiction novel."

Although the book's timeline is set to coincide with the entire saga of Jim Williams's arrest and four trials for murder, in reality Berendt did not meet Williams for the first time until March 1982, six weeks after the millionaire had been convicted of murder and released pending appeal. Two years later, after Berendt had decided he wanted to write a book, Williams agreed to be interviewed by Berendt in jail. "I might be interested in cooperating with you," he told Berendt. "I really want my story out." Berendt flew down to Savannah. "Jim actually saw very few people in jail. He didn't like to be in such reduced circumstances," said Berendt. "He always wanted to be on his own turf, where he could entertain people, and control people."

Berendt did not move to Savannah to collect material for his book until 1985, after Williams's second conviction. Berendt attended the third and fourth trials. Williams was a free man and living in Mercer House during Berendt's five years in Savannah. "He was available to me and very cooperative," Berendt said in 2015.

"When I started the book, I knew about the shooting," said Berendt. "It did not happen in the middle of my being there. But I moved it to the middle of the book so that you could meet everybody in Savannah and get to know Savannah before this shocking event happened."

"The only fictional character in the book is the narrator, me, until I catch up with myself midway through the book," Berendt said in 1995. "I felt that was a legitimate license to take. The book is 99 percent true and 1 percent exaggeration."

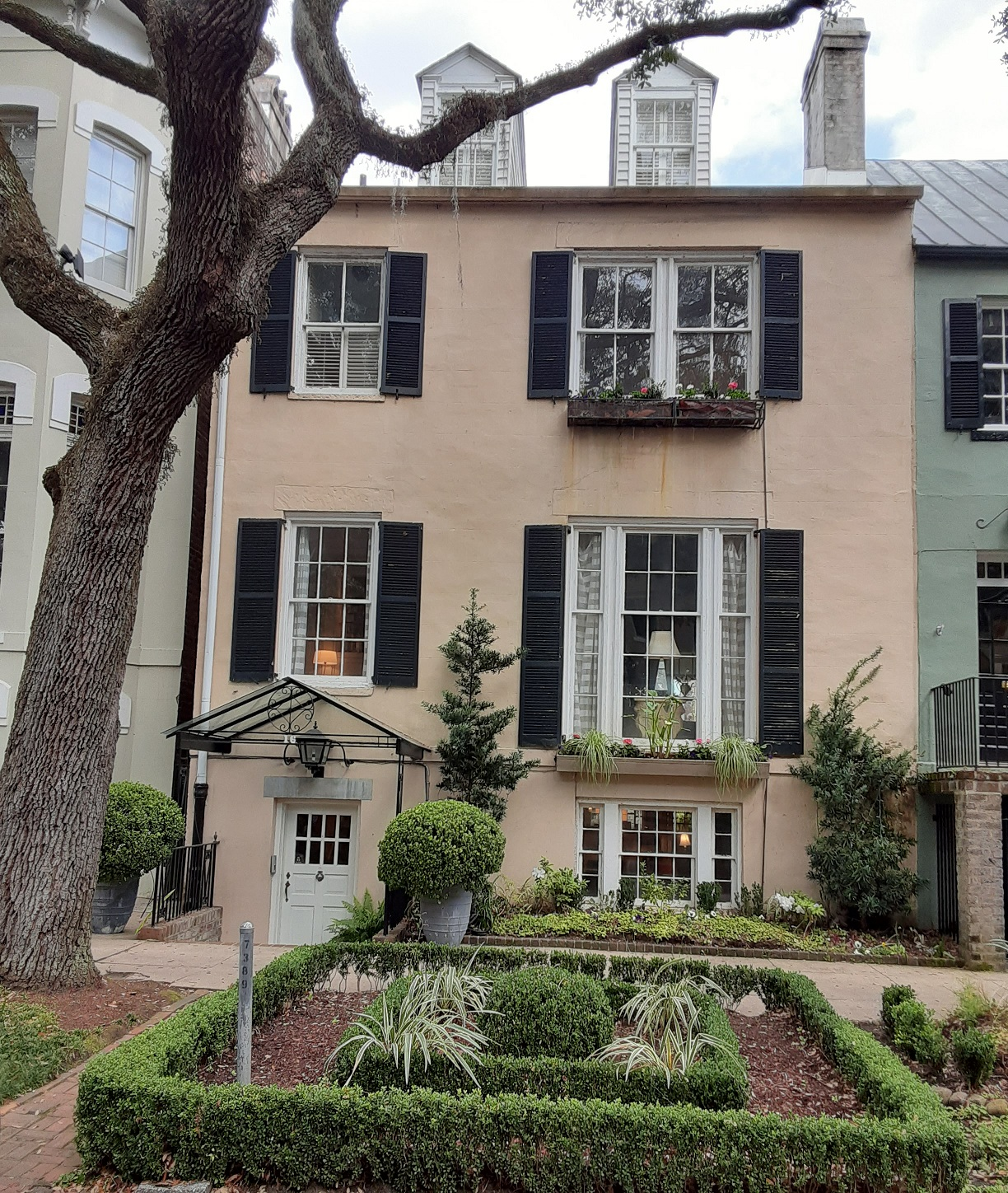
16 East Jones Street, the "Joe Odom House"

In the first chapter, Berendt and Williams are interrupted by Hansford's screaming entrance; this happened prior to Williams and Berendt's first meeting. "Jim was having drinks with somebody else," explains Berendt. "Jim told me about it and so did somebody else. So I reconstructed it, put myself in there. The first evening in Mercer House is a combination of a lot of stories he told me. Then afterward, I meet all these people — Joe Odom, Chablis, Lee Adler. I met all these people, obviously, after the murder, but they don't impact the murder at all, so I simply put them right after my meeting with Jim, and it seems as though I met them before the shooting and I didn't, but so what? All of those meetings with people were actual meetings. They took place in '85 or later, and they are pretty much verbatim what happened with those people and me."

Jim Williams's confession to Berendt before the third trial was recorded on a Dictaphone by the author. "If [Williams] had not died, I don't know what I would have done, because I'm pretty sure he would not have wanted that in the book."

Lee Adler initially shunned Berendt after the book's release, claiming he was misrepresented. "At first he wouldn't talk to me; now, he shakes my hand," said Berendt.

Nancy Hillis, who appears as Mandy Nicholls, later explained that, contrary to Berendt's portrayal of her, she did not meet Joe Odom until he had moved from 16 East Jones Street to 101 East Oglethorpe Avenue. She also clarified that there was no romantic relationship between her and Odom, largely because Odom was gay.

The person represented by Serena Dawes (based on Helen Avis Drexel) died in 1974, over twenty years before the book's release.

Minerva is based on Valerie Boles, a root doctor from South Carolina.

Regarding the high number of eccentric characters in Savannah, Berendt's belief is that it is because gossip was so important during his time in the city. "People in Savannah gossip more than anywhere else," he said. "What do people gossip about? Other people's behavior. The stranger the behavior, the better the gossip. The person that is being gossiped about knows they are being appreciated and attempts to outdo themself on the strangeness."

In 2024, Berendt stated that he believed Williams was guilty of murder.

== Title ==
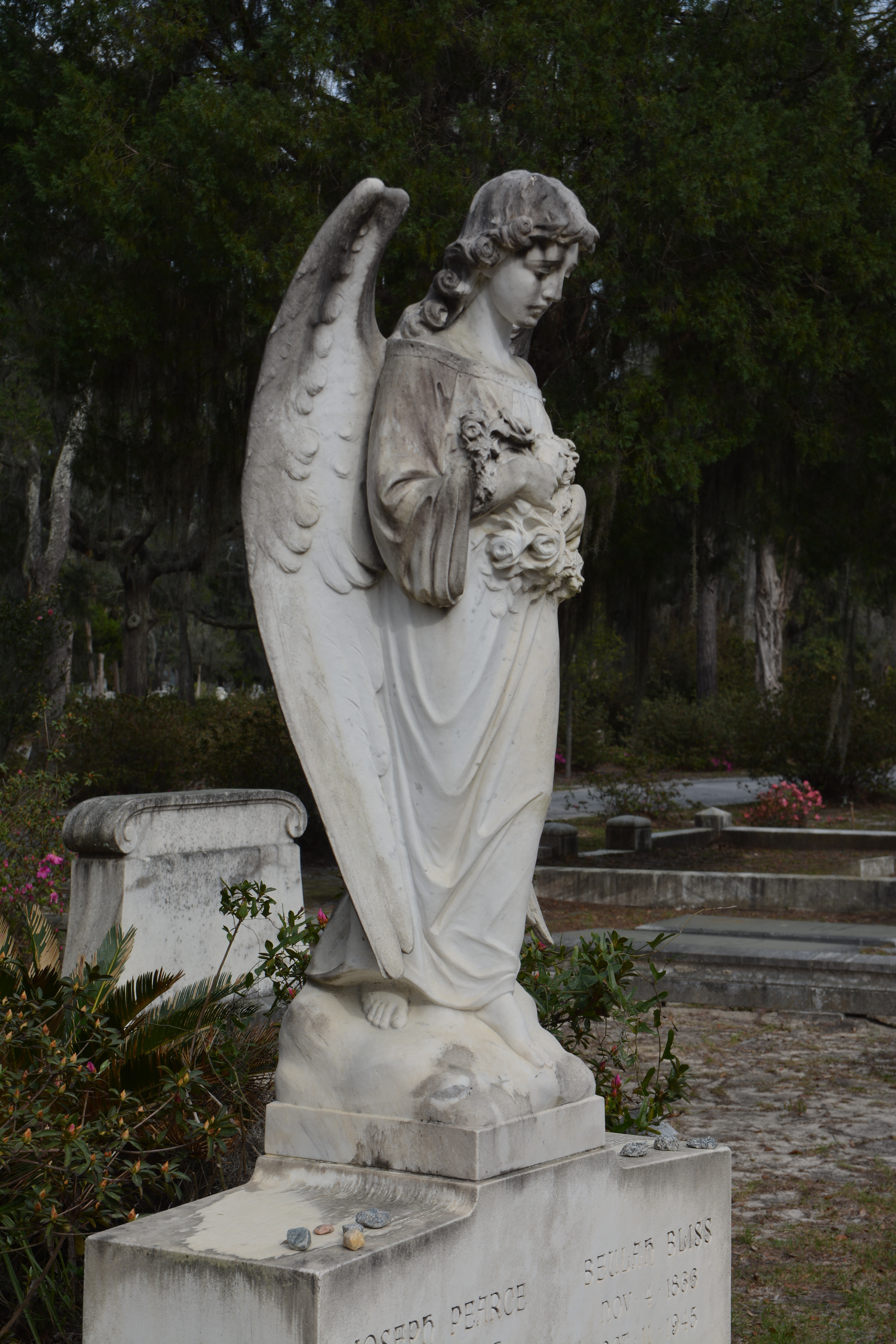
Bonaventure Cemetery

As explained in chapter 18 of the book, its title alludes to the hoodoo notion of "midnight," the period between the time for good magic (11:30pm to midnight) and the time for evil magic (midnight to 12:30am).

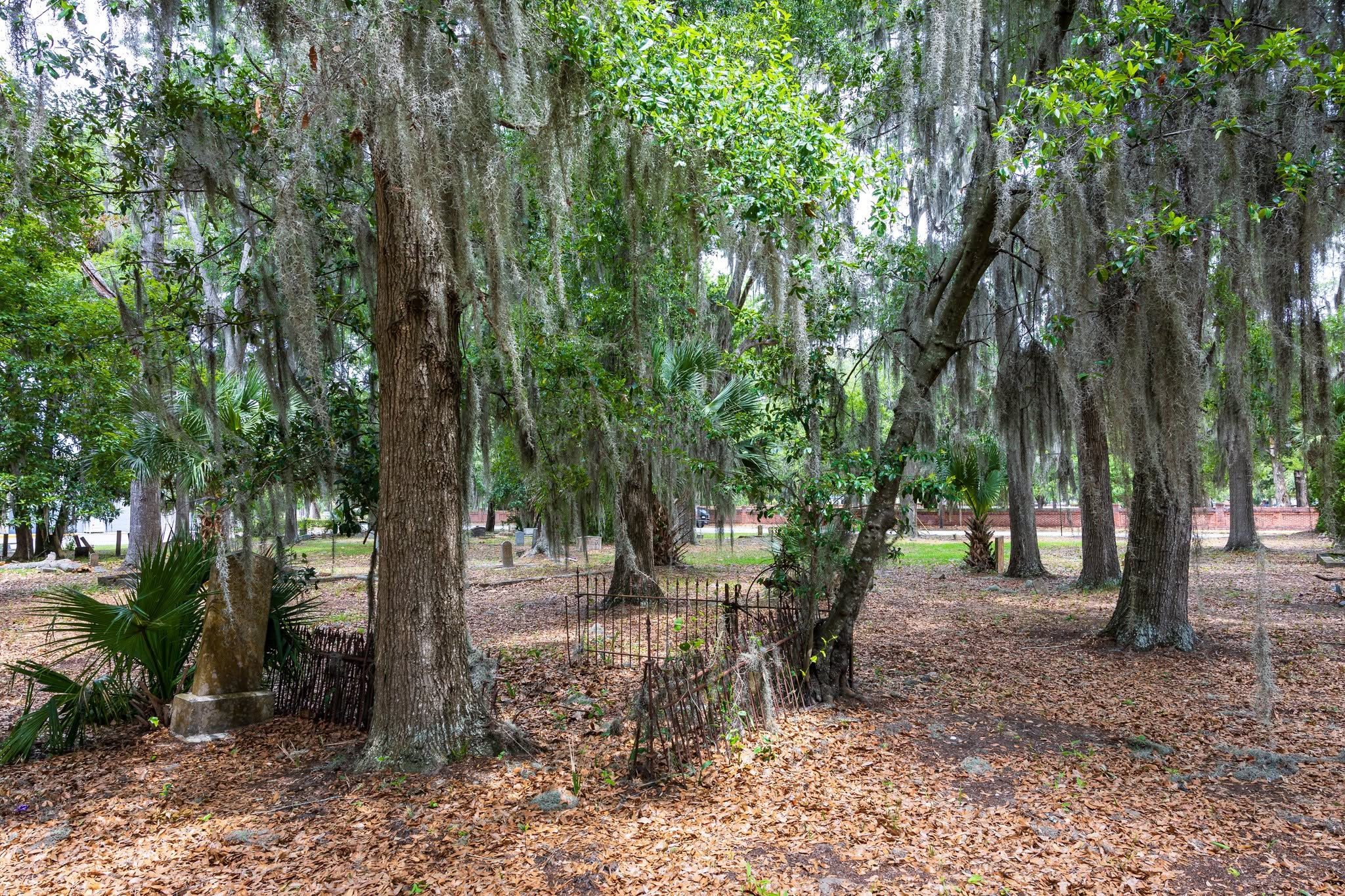
Citizens Cemetery in Beaufort, South Carolina, is the "garden" referenced in the title of the book

Although Bonaventure Cemetery is the focus in the book, the "(flower) garden" in the title refers principally to Citizens Cemetery in Beaufort, South Carolina, where Dr. Buzzard, the common-law partner of folk-magic practitioner Minerva, is buried. It is over his grave that Minerva performed the incantations to ensure a more successful result in the retrial for the case of Jim Williams. (The marriage between Minerva and Dr. Buzzard was the invention of John Berendt. Dr. Buzzard was based on Stephen Robinson, who died in 1947, aged 61 or 62.)

== Cover ==
The Bird Girl statue, designed both as art and as a birdseed holder, was originally located in Bonaventure Cemetery. A Savannah photographer, Jack Leigh, was commissioned to take a photograph for the cover of the book. The cover image became immediately iconic, with author John Berendt calling it "one of the strongest covers I've ever seen", and the statue became a popular stop for tourists. Owing to rising concerns about the integrity of the statue and the cemetery's privacy, Bird Girl was relocated in 1997 for display in Telfair Museums in Savannah.

== Legacy ==
In 1993, the year before the book's publication, Savannah had five million visitors, who spent almost $600 million during their time in the city. Two years after the book's release, Savannah was seeing a 46% increase in tourism. Twenty years later, the number of visitors to the city had jumped to 12.5 million, spending $2.2 billion. Joseph Marinelli, president of the Savannah Convention and Visitors Bureau, does not attribute the city's popularity growth entirely to the book, but states that it had a significant impact. In 2022, the estimated number of visitors to Savannah was over 17 million.

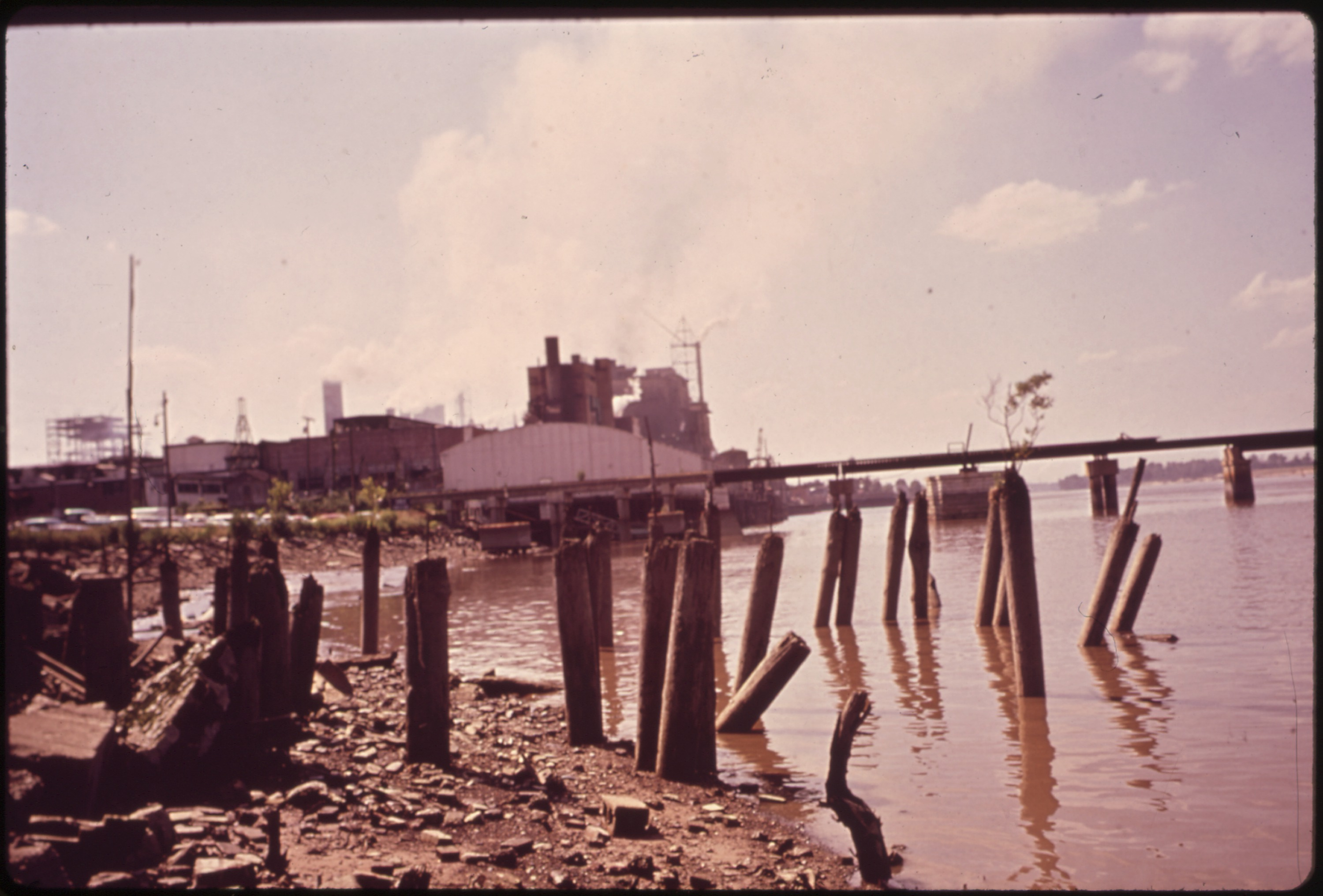
The former Union Camp plant in Savannah

Patrick Monahan, former County and Interim City Manager, believes that Savannah's popularity was also assisted by the city's air having been improved around the time of the book's release. This occurred when Union Camp paper mill's smokestacks were scrubbed clean of sulfur dioxide particulates, thus eliminating the "odor of rotten eggs" permeating Savannah's streets.

Dorothy Kingery, Jim Williams's sister, did not like the book. "She kept everything hush-hush," explained Sonny Seiler, the Williams family attorney, "but now she lets tourists go through Mercer–Williams House. But they cannot talk about the unpleasantness or what went on in that study on the first floor."

The story was turned into a musical in 2024 with lyrics and music by Jason Robert Brown and book by Taylor Mac.

== Awards ==
The book won the 1995 Boeke Prize and Lambda Literary Award and was one of the finalists for the 1995 Pulitzer Prize for non-fiction.

== Audiobook ==
Jeff Woodman recorded the audiobook version of Midnight in the Garden of Good and Evil. He stated that Berendt's effort, along with that of Ellen Raskin's The Westing Game, was the most challenging to record: "Especially because all the characters in Midnight have the same damned Savannah accent, so you can't toss in a little North Country to help differentiate them!" he said in 2010.
