= Joseph Johnston Property =

Historic house in Savannah, Georgia

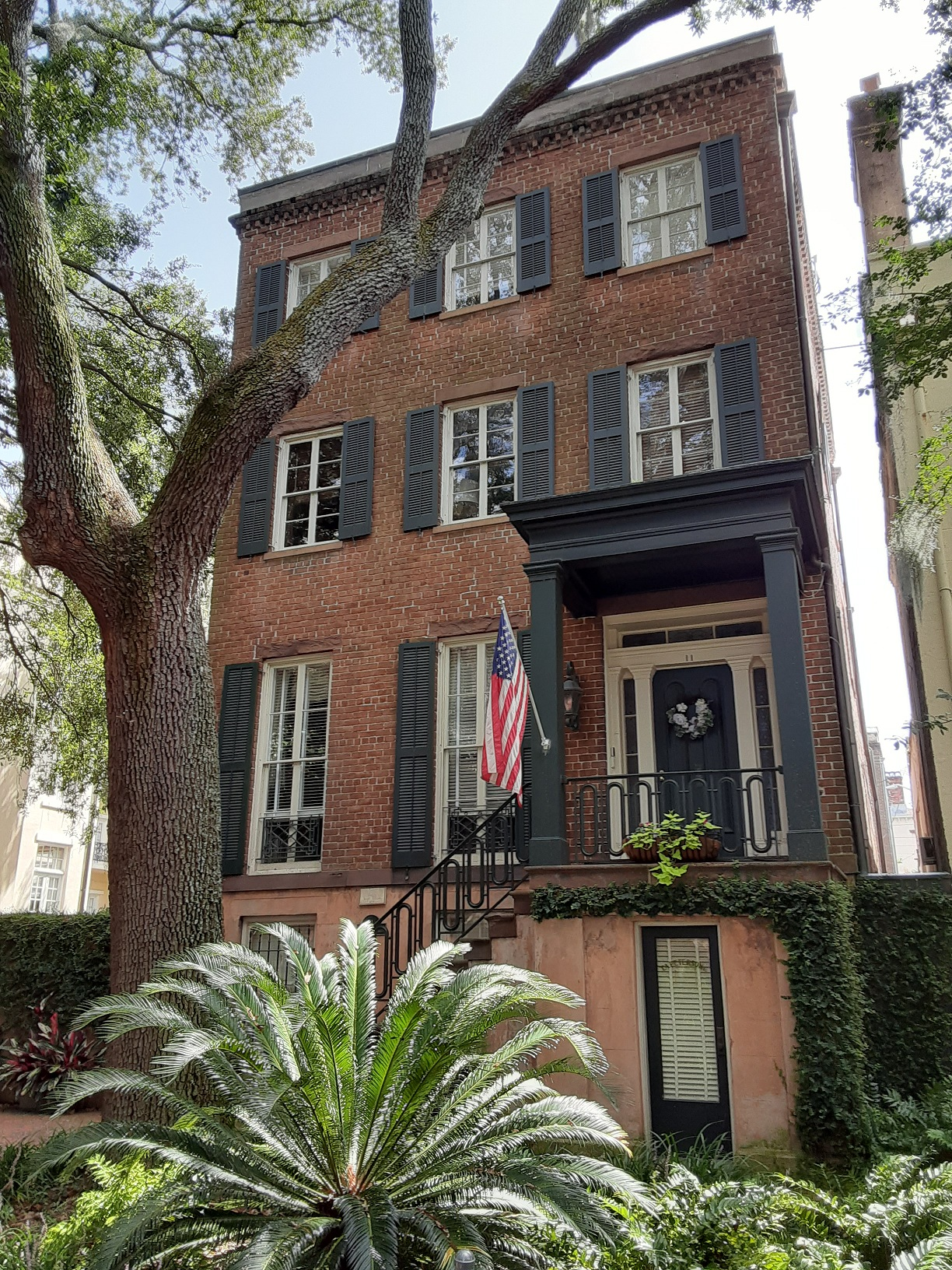
- The building in 2021
- Interactive map of the Joseph Johnston Property area

General information
- Location: Savannah, Georgia, U.S., 11 West Jones Street
- Coordinates: 32.0724°N 81.0950°W
- Completed: 1854 (172 years ago)

Technical details
- Floor count: 3

The Joseph Johnston Property is a home in Savannah, Georgia, United States. It is located at 11 West Jones Street and was constructed in 1854.

The building is part of the Savannah Historic District, and in a survey for the Historic Savannah Foundation, Mary Lane Morrison found the building to be of significant status.

The house was built for Joseph E. Johnston, general officer in the Confederate Army, and sold to fellow Confederate officer Algernon Sydney Hartridge in 1860.

== See also ==
- Buildings in Savannah Historic District
