= Isaac Brunner Property (203 West Jones Street) =

Historic house in Savannah, Georgia

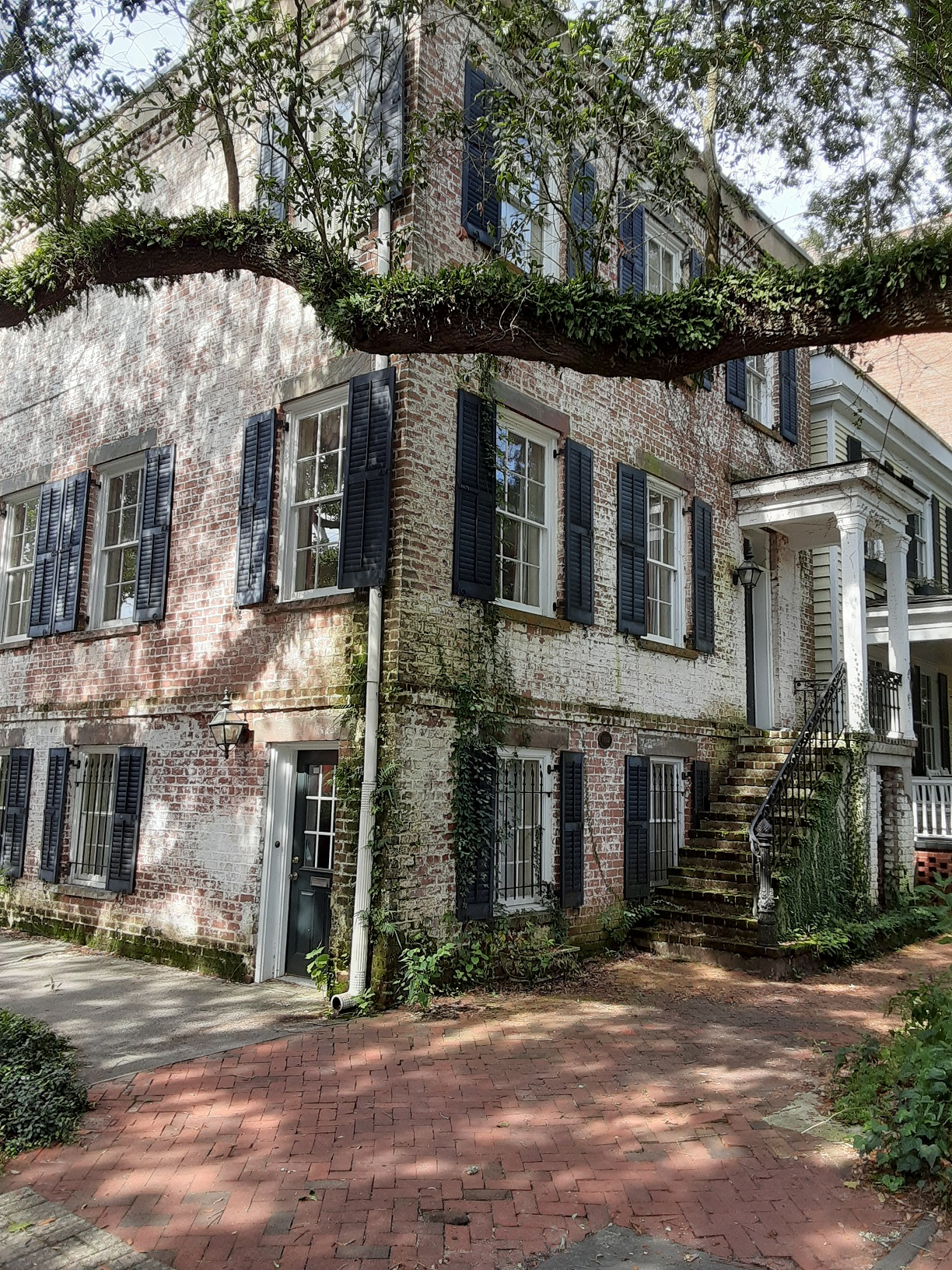
- The building in 2021
- Interactive map of the Isaac Brunner Property area

General information
- Location: Savannah, Georgia, U.S., 203 West Jones Street
- Coordinates: 32.0729°N 81.0968°W
- Completed: 1852 (174 years ago)

Technical details
- Floor count: 3

The Isaac Brunner Property is a home in Savannah, Georgia, United States. It is located at 203 West Jones Street and was constructed in 1852. Brunner, a city alderman, also owned the adjacent property, at 205 West Jones Street, constructed a year earlier.

The building is part of the Savannah Historic District. In a survey for the Historic Savannah Foundation, Mary Lane Morrison found the building to be of significant status.

== See also ==
- Buildings in Savannah Historic District
