= Elizabeth, Isaac & Jacob Cohen House =

Historic house in Savannah, Georgia

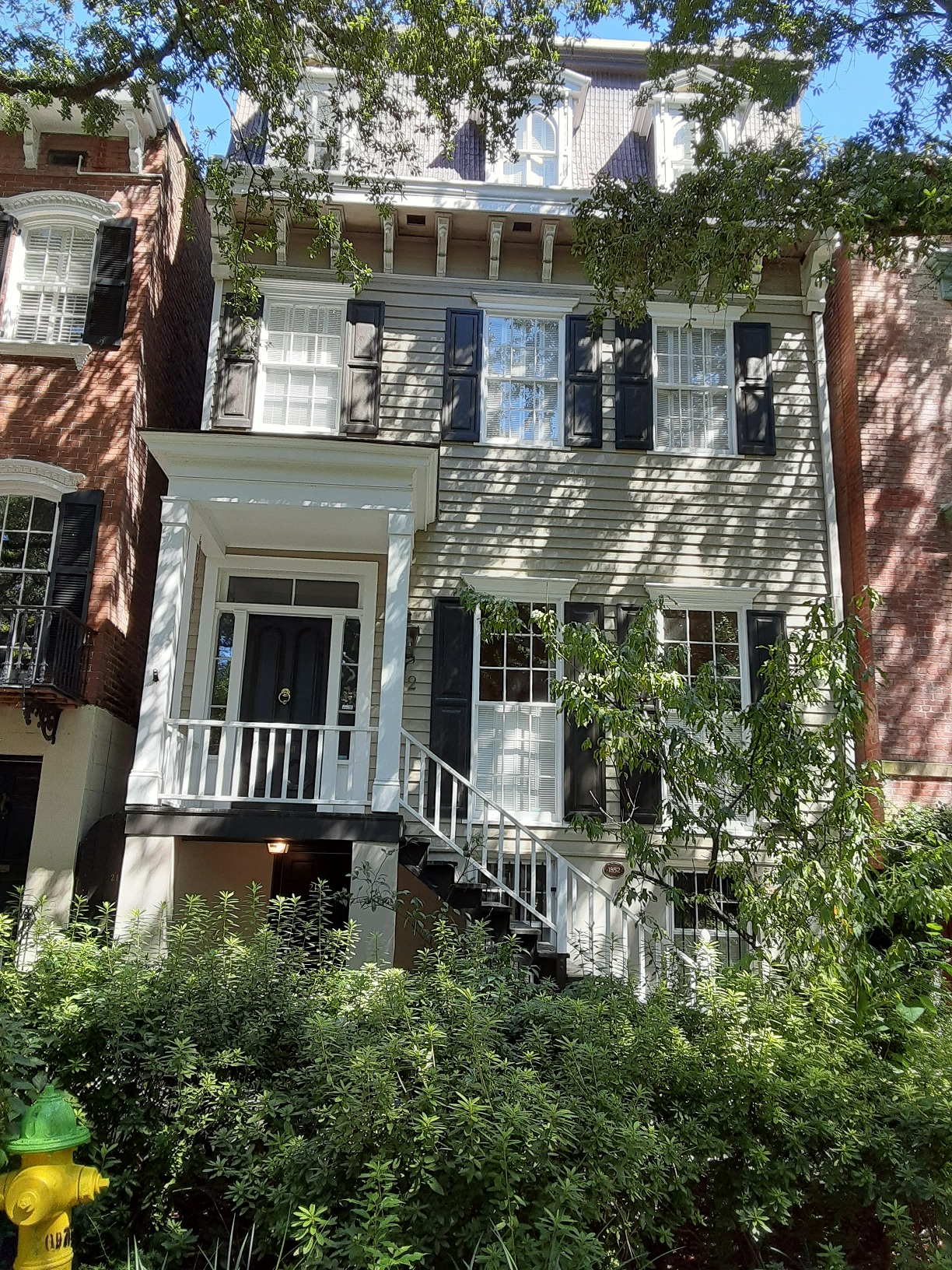
- The building in 2021
- Interactive map of the Elizabeth, Isaac & Jacob Cohen House area

General information
- Location: Savannah, Georgia, U.S., 212 West Jones Street
- Coordinates: 32.0733°N 81.09700°W
- Completed: 1852 (174 years ago)

Technical details
- Floor count: 4

The Elizabeth, Isaac & Jacob Cohen House is a home in Savannah, Georgia, United States. It is located at 212 West Jones Street and was constructed in 1852.

Part of the Savannah Historic District, the home was built for three members of the Cohen family. All minors at the time of the building's construction, it was likely a trust investment. By 1861 the property was owned by William Brantley, city alderman from 1860 to 1861. Charles W. Brunner later owned the property. Its roof was raised in 1872, making a fourth storey.

In a survey for the Historic Savannah Foundation, Mary Lane Morrison found the building to be of significant status.

== See also ==
- Buildings in Savannah Historic District
