= Joe Odom House =

Historic house in Savannah, Georgia

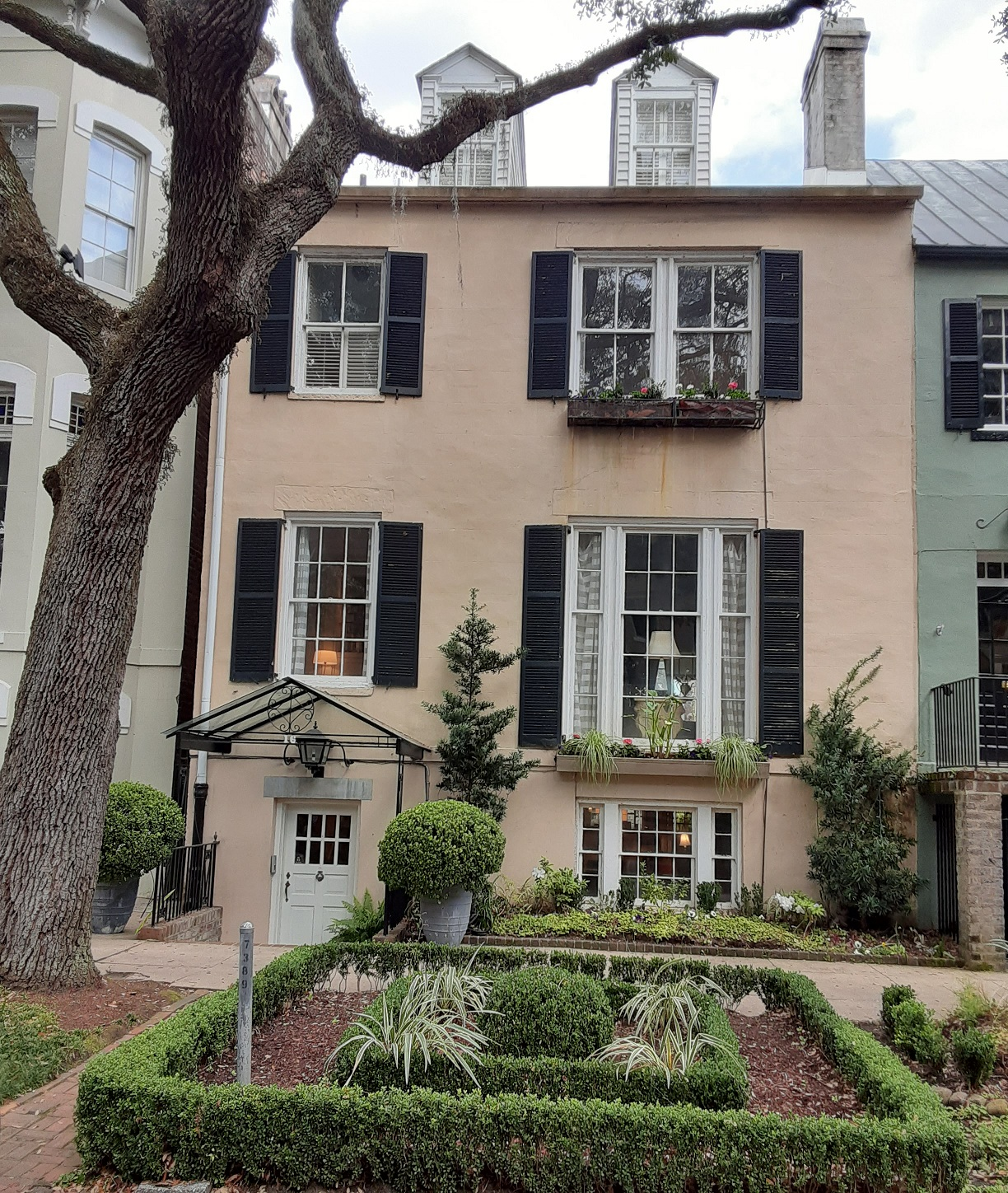
- The building in 2022
- Interactive map of the Joe Odom House area

General information
- Location: Savannah, Georgia, U.S., 16 East Jones Street
- Coordinates: 32.0725°N 81.0935°W
- Completed: 1847 (179 years ago)

The Joe Odom House is a home in Savannah, Georgia, United States. It is located at 16 East Jones Street and was constructed in 1847.

The building is part of the Savannah Historic District, and in a survey for the Historic Savannah Foundation, Mary Lane Morrison found the building to be of significant status.

Built for Eliza Ann Jewett, it later become the home of Joe Odom. Odom, an attorney-turned-musician was featured in the John Berendt non-fiction novel Midnight in the Garden of Good and Evil, although he died three years before the book's 1994 release.

A block south of Madison Square, this and 18 East Jones Street are two of the earliest constructions on the street.

== See also ==
- Buildings in Savannah Historic District
