= David Cohen House =

Historic house in Savannah, Georgia

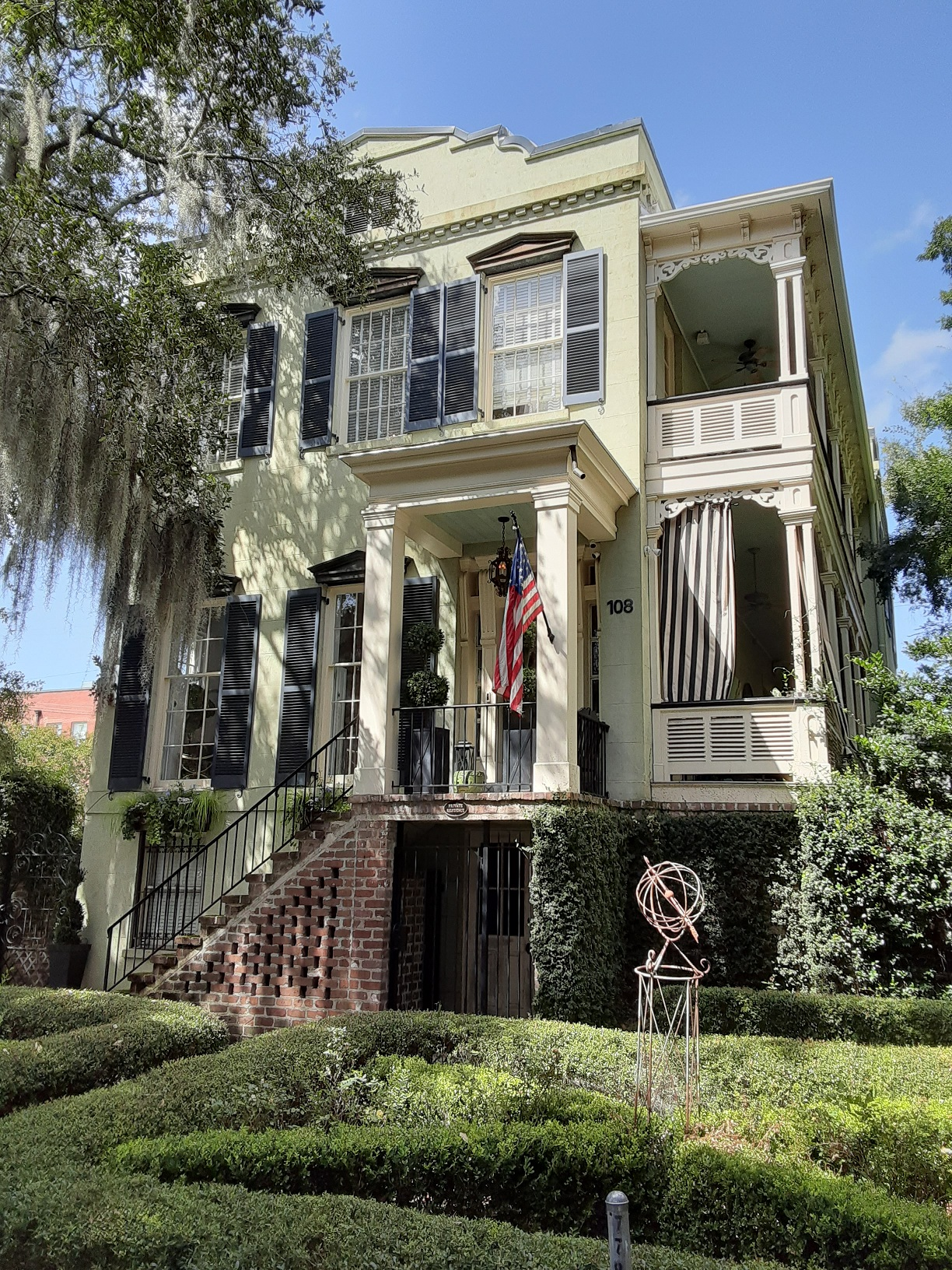
- The building in 2021
- Interactive map of the David Cohen House area

General information
- Location: Savannah, Georgia, U.S., 108 East Jones Street
- Coordinates: 32.0723°N 81.0928°W
- Completed: 1853 (173 years ago)

Technical details
- Floor count: 3

The David Cohen House is a home in Savannah, Georgia, United States. It is located at 108 East Jones Street and was constructed in 1853.

The building is part of the Savannah Historic District, and in a survey for the Historic Savannah Foundation, Mary Lane Morrison found the building to be of significant status.

It was built for David Lopez Cohen (1820–1893), a successful ship builder from Charleston, South Carolina, and the nephew of David L. Lopez. He also built the Shearith Israel Synagogue at 34 Wentworth Street in Charleston. He is interred in Laurel Grove Cemetery.

== See also ==
- Buildings in Savannah Historic District
