= Augustus Barié Property =

Historic house in Savannah, Georgia

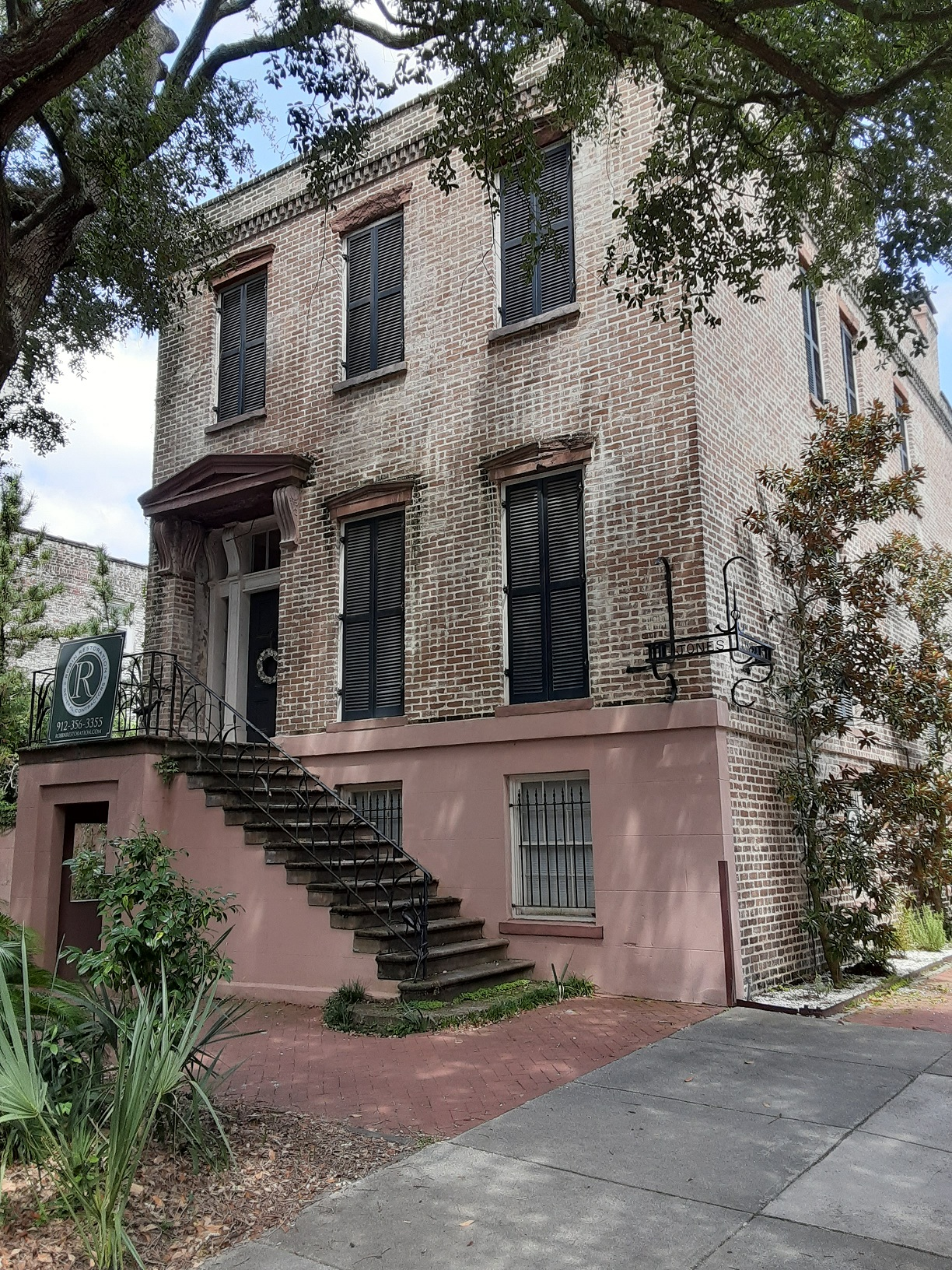
- The building in 2021
- Interactive map of the Augustus Barié Property area

General information
- Location: Savannah, Georgia, U.S., 222 East Jones Street
- Coordinates: 32.0718°N 81.0910°W
- Completed: 1857 (169 years ago)

Technical details
- Floor count: 3

The Augustus Barié Property is a home in Savannah, Georgia, United States. It is located at 222 East Jones Street.

The building is part of the Savannah Historic District, and in a survey for the Historic Savannah Foundation, Mary Lane Morrison found the building to be of significant status.

It was built for Augustus Montfort Barié in (1815–1904) in 1857, and sold to George Dillon at year's end for $5,500. By 1859, Dillon had sold the property to John Cunningham, who kept it until 1873.

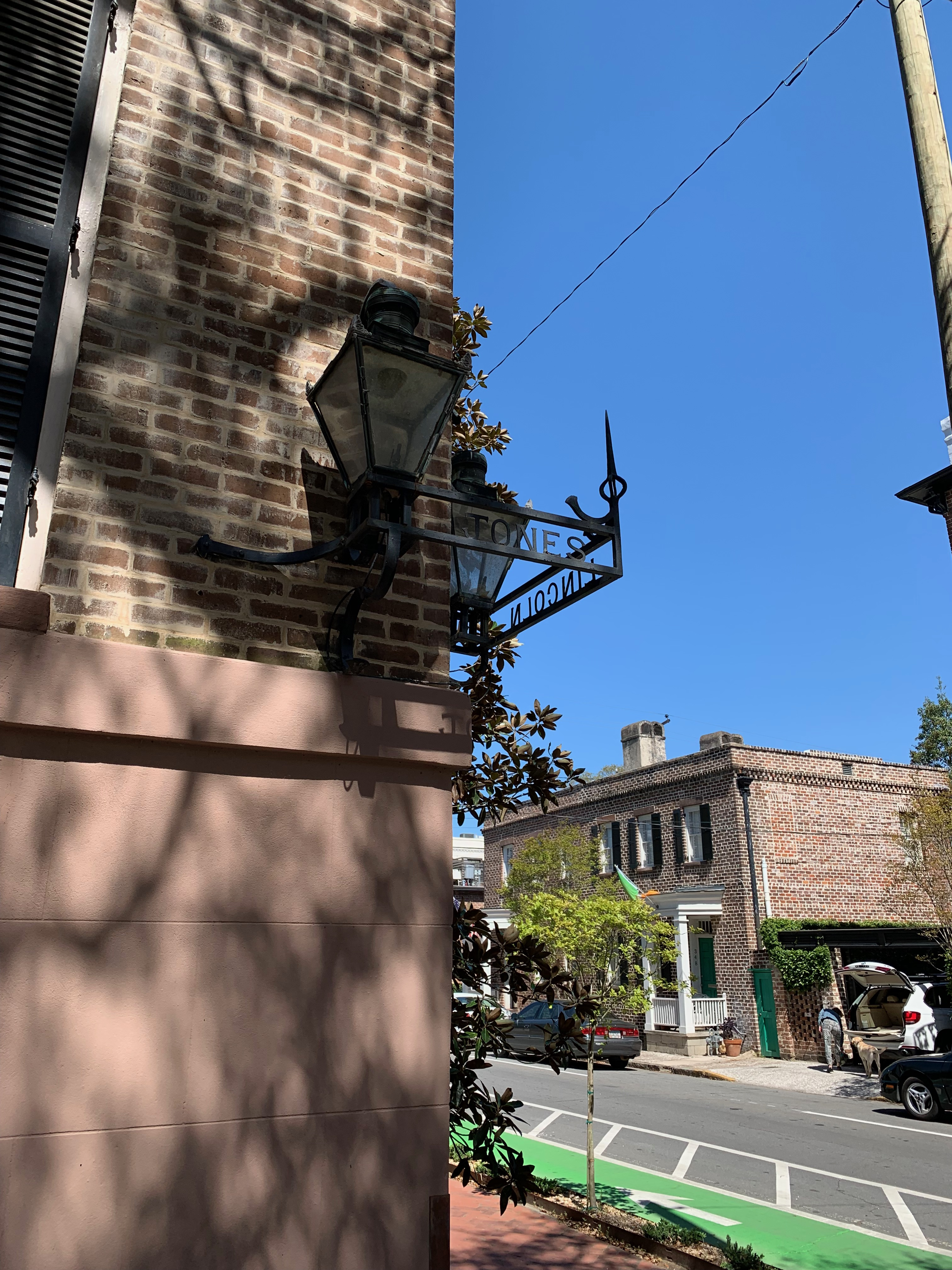
Sign on the corner of 222 East Jones at Lincoln Street

== See also ==
- Buildings in Savannah Historic District
