= James Kerr House (Savannah, Georgia) =

Historic house in Savannah, Georgia

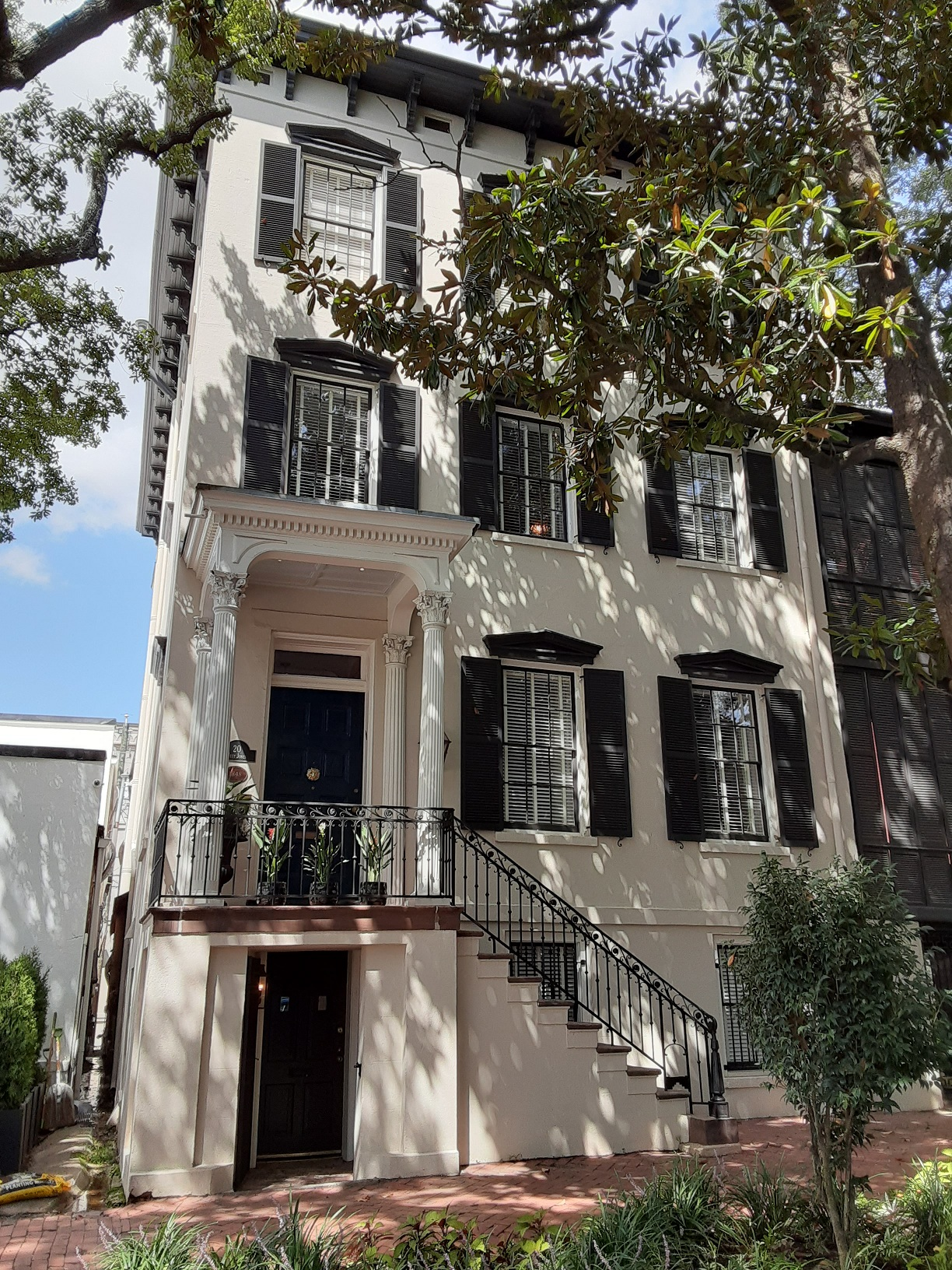
- The building in 2021
- Interactive map of the James Kerr House area

General information
- Location: Savannah, Georgia, U.S., 20 West Jones Street
- Coordinates: 32.0728°N 81.0951°W
- Completed: 1849 (177 years ago)

Technical details
- Floor count: 4

The James Kerr House is a home in Savannah, Georgia, United States. It is located at 20 West Jones Street and was constructed in 1849.

Built for James Ker (possibly Kerr), the building is part of the Savannah Historic District. In a survey for the Historic Savannah Foundation, Mary Lane Morrison found the building to be of significant status.

== See also ==
- Buildings in Savannah Historic District
