= Eliza Ann Jewett Property (18 East Jones Street) =

Historic house in Savannah, Georgia

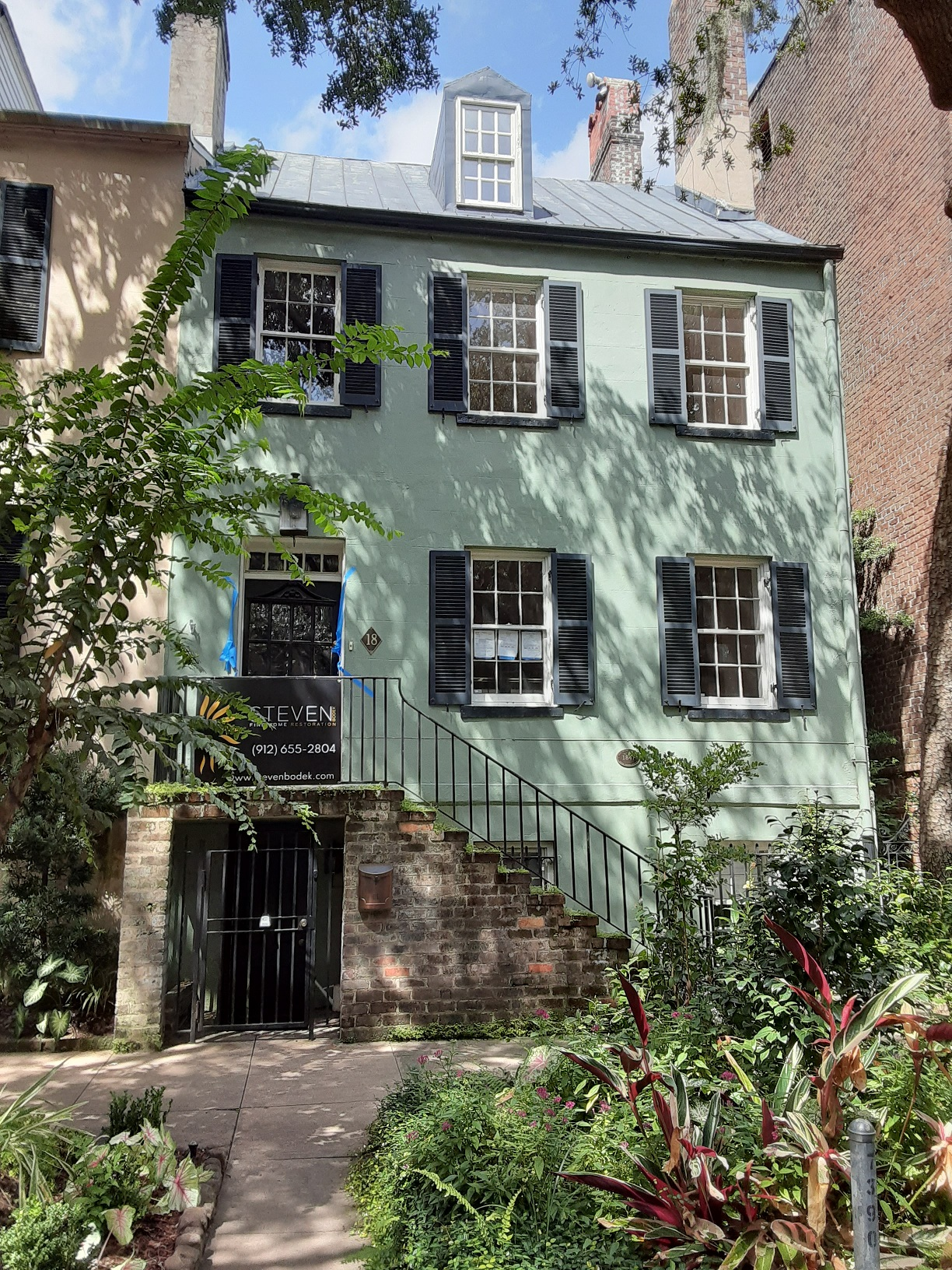
- The building in 2021
- Interactive map of the Eliza Ann Jewett Property area

General information
- Location: Savannah, Georgia, U.S., 18 East Jones Street
- Coordinates: 32.0724°N 81.0935°W
- Completed: 1847 (179 years ago)

Technical details
- Floor count: 3

The Eliza Ann Jewett Property is a home in Savannah, Georgia, United States. It is located at 18 East Jones Street and was constructed in 1847.

The building, located a block south of Madison Square, is part of the Savannah Historic District, and in a survey for the Historic Savannah Foundation, Mary Lane Morrison found the building to be of significant status.

It was built for Eliza Ann Jewett around the same time as the Joe Odom House next door (number 16), the two being amongst the earliest constructions on Jones Street.

== See also ==
- Buildings in Savannah Historic District
