= C. D. Rogers House =

Historic house in Savannah, Georgia, US

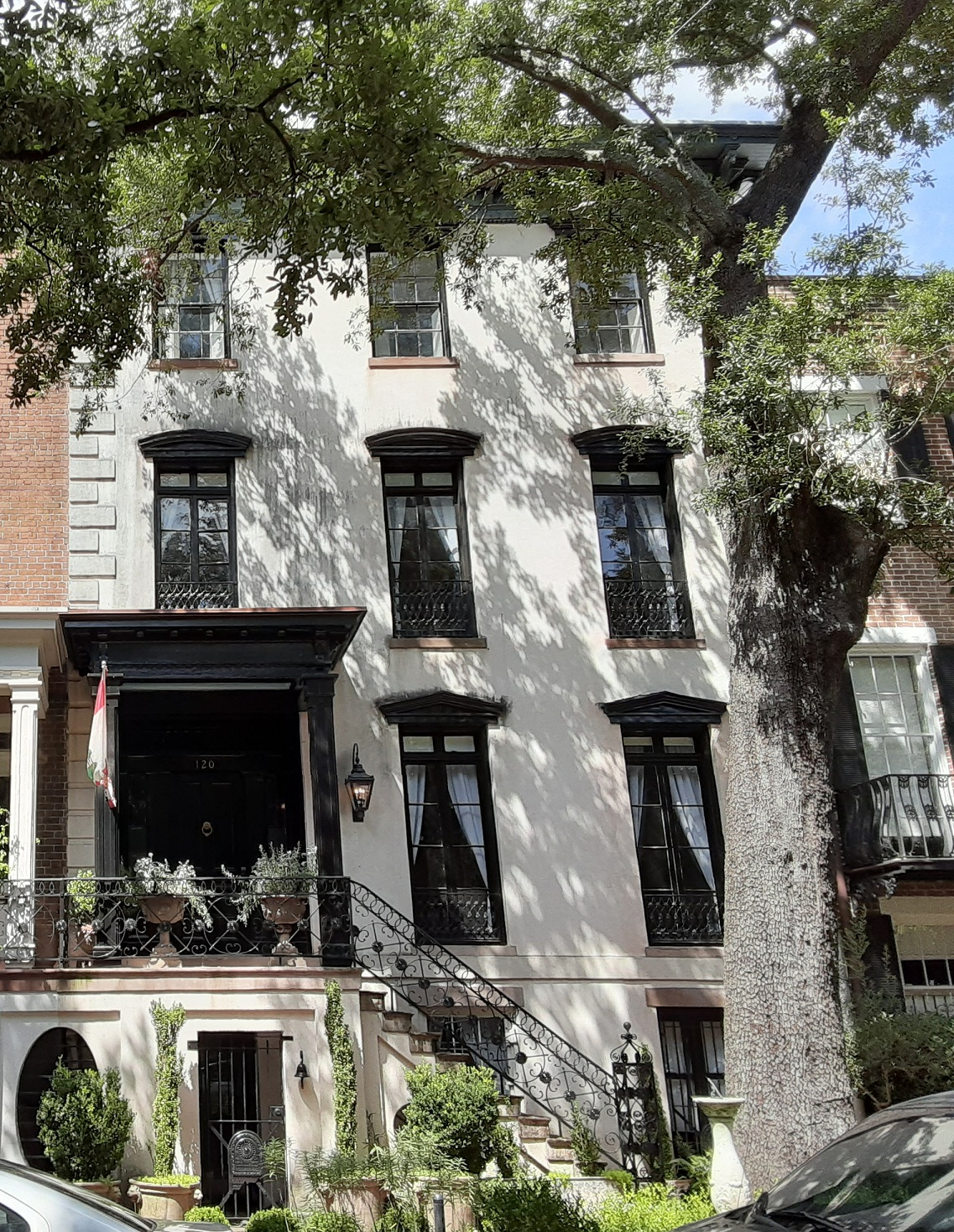
- The building in 2021
- Interactive map of the C. D. Rogers House area

General information
- Location: Savannah, Georgia, U.S., 120 West Jones Street
- Coordinates: 32.0730°N 81.0960°W
- Completed: 1871 (155 years ago)

Technical details
- Floor count: 4

The C. D. Rogers House is a home in Savannah, Georgia, United States. It is located at 120 West Jones Street and was constructed in 1871. It was built for Cornelius Decatur Rogers.

The building is part of the Savannah Historic District. In a survey for the Historic Savannah Foundation, Mary Lane Morrison found the building to be of significant status.

== See also ==
- Buildings in Savannah Historic District
