= Anna Colquitt Hunter =

- Colquitt around 1940, during World War II, when she was a Red Cross field director
- Born: Anna Habersham Colquitt; January 21, 1892; Savannah, Georgia, U.S.
- Died: January 28, 1985 (aged 93); Tybee Island, Georgia, U.S.
- Occupations: Preservationist, artist

Anna Habersham Hunter (née Colquitt; January 21, 1892 – January 28, 1985) was an American preservationist, and a founder of the Historic Savannah Foundation in 1955.

== Early life ==
Hunter was a descendant of James Habersham (1712–1775), a pioneering merchant and statesman in the British North American colony of Georgia. She was born in Savannah, Georgia, in 1892, but also grew up in South Carolina.

She was a graduate of Agnes Scott College, but left to marry George Lewis Cope Hunter, son of James Henry Hunter and Harriet Cope, who was a student of agriculture at the University of Georgia in Athens, Georgia. He was registered as a student in 1908.

George died in 1936, aged 44, leaving his widow with three children to support.

== Career ==
After her husband's death, Hunter began working for the Savannah Morning News and the Savannah Evening Press as a reporter, columnist and editor.

During World War II, she served as a Red Cross field director, serving in North Africa and Italy.

After the war, she performed as a dancer and singer, taking her to New York City in addition to dates in the South.

=== Historic Savannah Foundation ===
In 1954, Savannah's popular City Market in Ellis Square was demolished to be replaced by a parking garage, prompting a public outcry. The following year, a funeral home was set to purchase the Isaiah Davenport House in Columbia Square and tear it down for a parking lot. This sparked a movement to start a preservation process in the city.

"What began as an effort to save one house quickly turned into an organized movement that went on to save an entire city." – Historic Savannah Foundation

Hunter formed a group with six of her friends to block the demolition of the house and formed the Historic Savannah Foundation. The group managed to raise the $22,500 needed to purchase the property themselves.

== Death ==
Hunter died in 1985, aged 93. She is buried with her husband, whom she survived by 49 years, in Savannah's Bonaventure Cemetery.

=== Legacy ===
In 2024, a monument in Columbia Square was commissioned to honor the seven women who began the preservation movement in Savannah. Alongside Hunter's name will be Katherine Judkins Clark, Elinor Adler Dillard, Lucy Barrow McIntire, Dorothy Ripley Roebling, Nola McEvoy Roos and Jane Adair Wright.
