= 115 East Jones Street =

Historic house in Savannah, Georgia

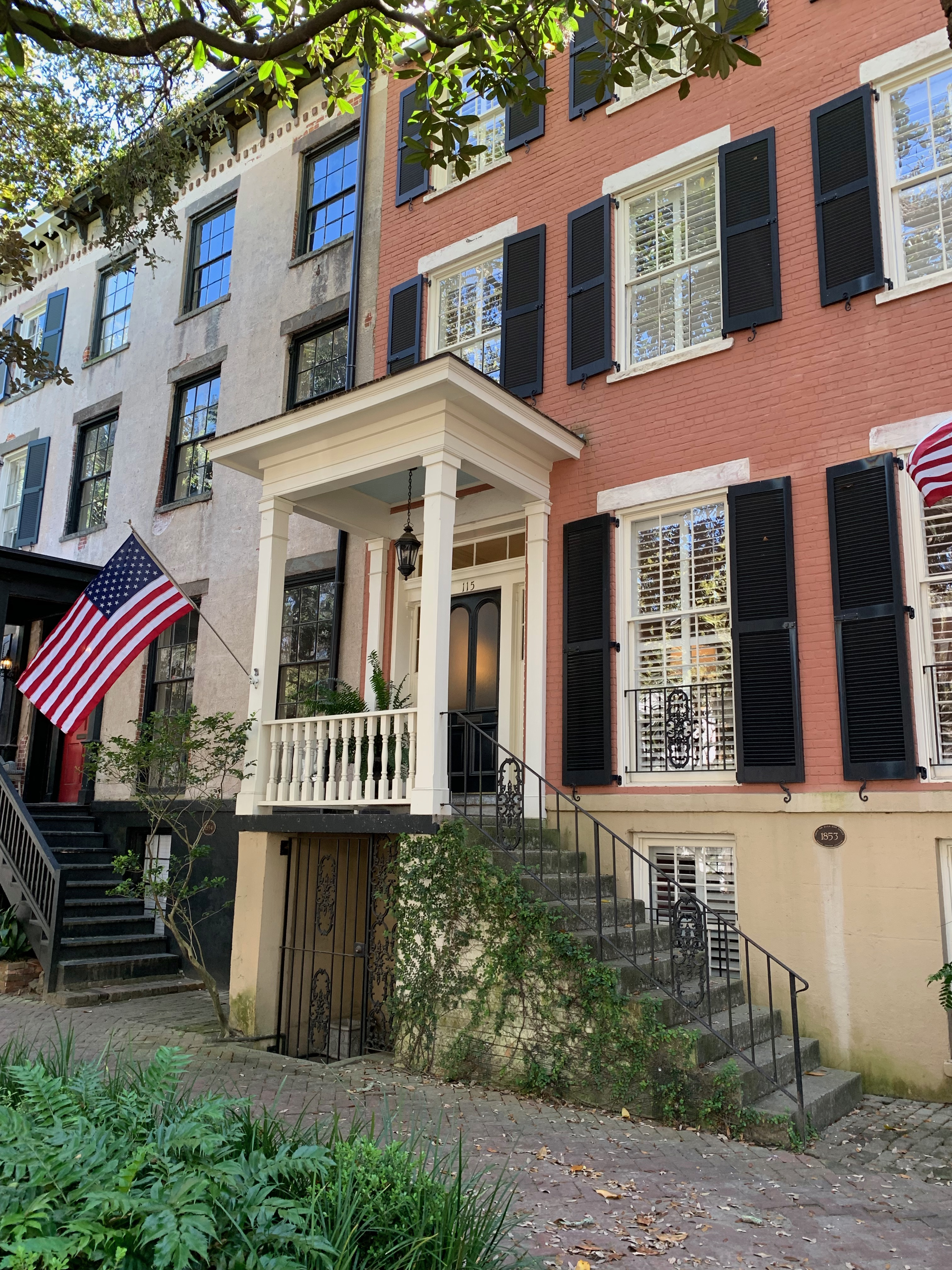
- The building in 2019
- Interactive map of the 115 East Jones Street area

General information
- Location: Savannah, Georgia, U.S., 115 East Jones Street
- Coordinates: 32.0718°N 81.0926°W
- Completed: 1853 (173 years ago)

Technical details
- Floor count: 3

115 East Jones Street is a home in Savannah, Georgia, United States. It is located on historic Jones Street and was constructed in 1853.

The building is part of the Savannah Historic District, and in a survey by the Historic Savannah Foundation, it was found to be of significant status.

Built as part of the three-unit Eliza Ann Jewett Row House, number 115 featured in the 1997 movie Midnight in the Garden of Good and Evil as the venue for the party hosted by Joe Odom. He was house-sitting for its owner, who was in New York.

== Eliza Ann Jewett Row House ==
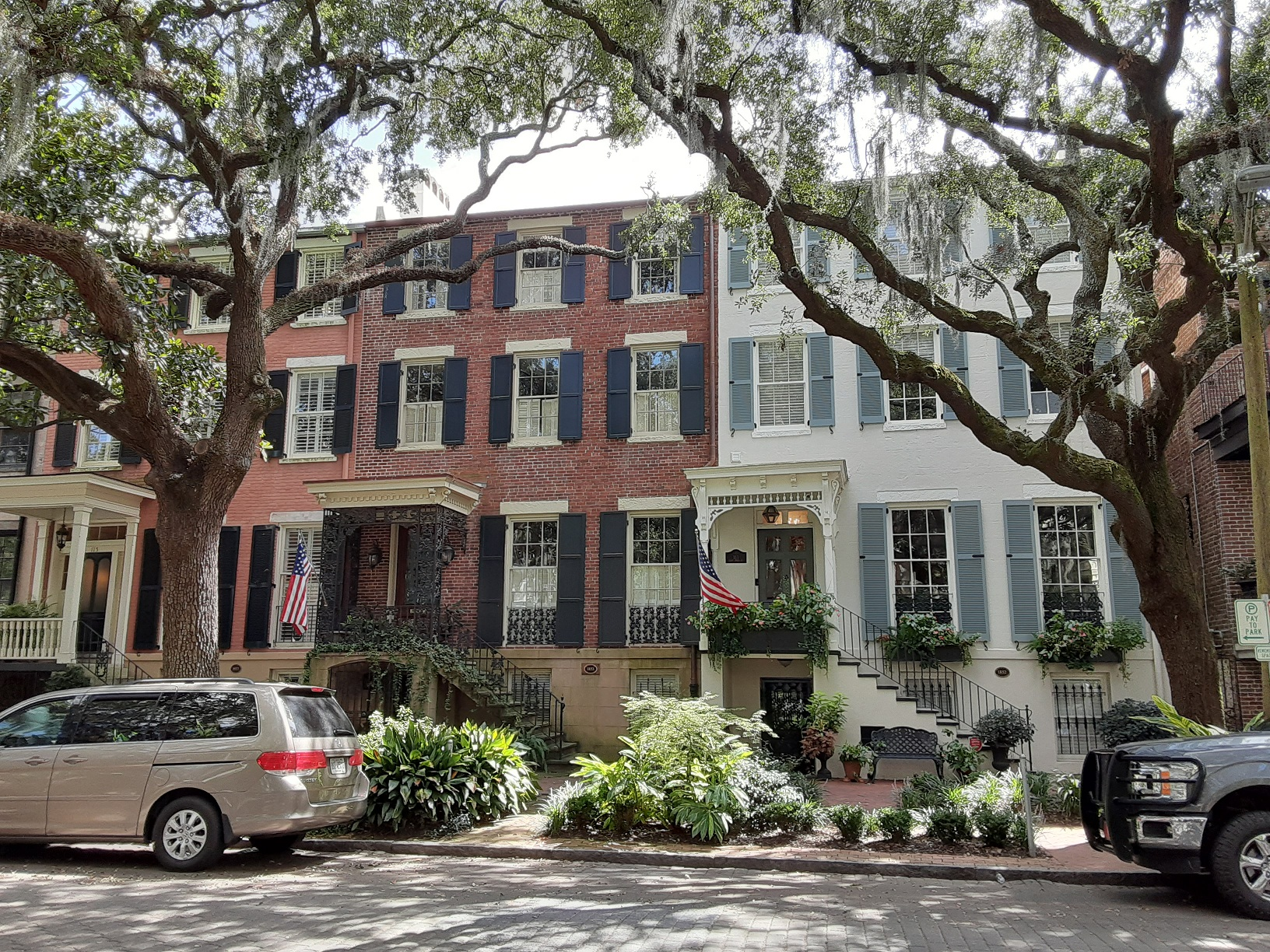
115, 113 and 111

== See also ==
- Buildings in Savannah Historic District
