= Jesse Mount House =

Historic house in Savannah, Georgia

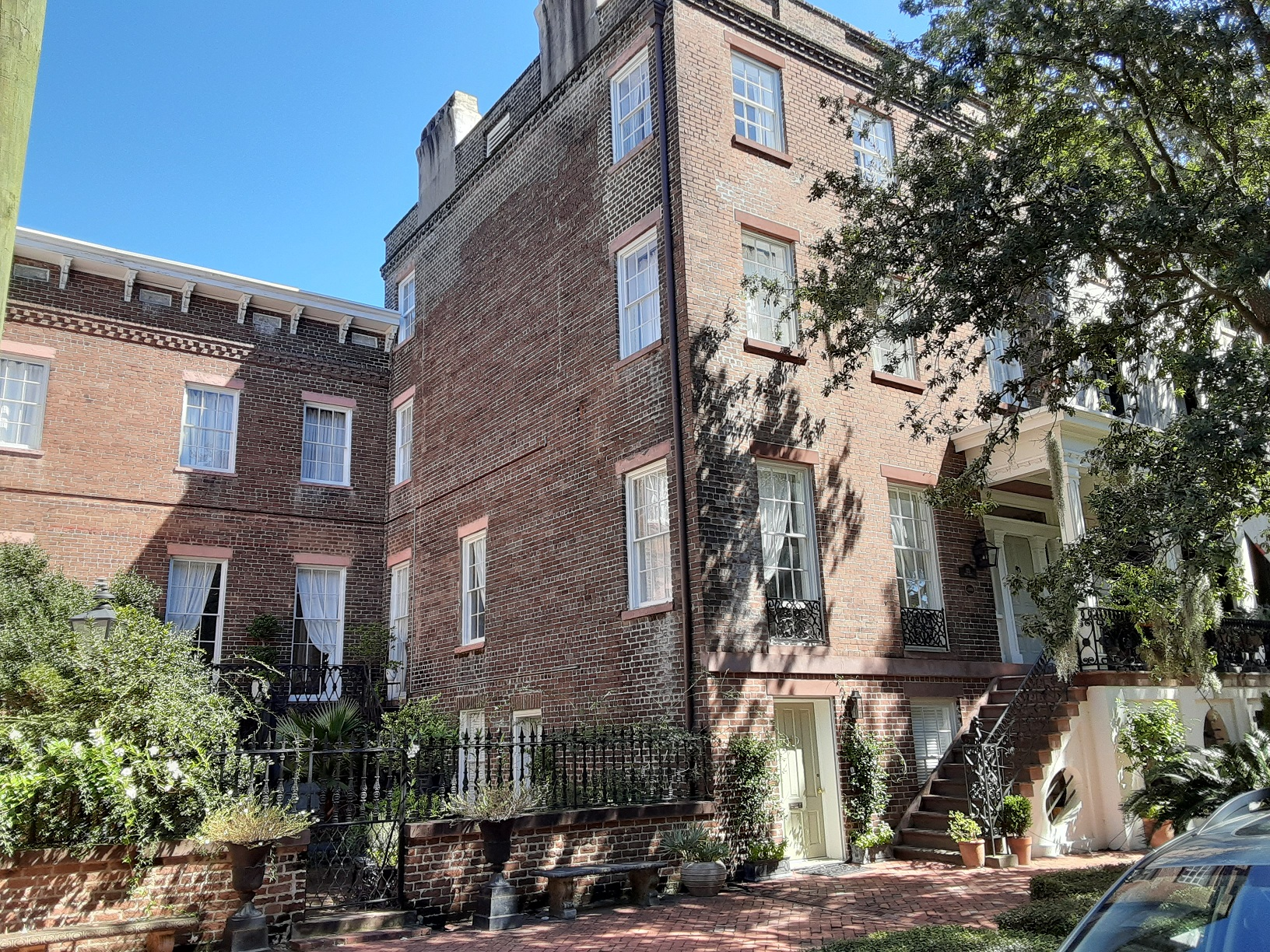
- The building in 2021
- Interactive map of the Jesse Mount House area

General information
- Location: Savannah, Georgia, U.S., 122–124 West Jones Street
- Coordinates: 32.0730°N 81.0961°W
- Completed: 1852 (174 years ago)

Technical details
- Floor count: 4

The Jesse Mount House, also known as the Champion–McAlpin House, is a home in Savannah, Georgia, United States. It is located at 122–124 West Jones Street and was constructed in 1852.

Built for Jesse Mount, a wing was added in 1857. It was owned by a Mrs. Maria McAlpin from 1859 to 1888. Maria's father, Aaron Champion, lived at the Harper Fowlkes House, at 230 Barnard Street, from 1843. Improvements totaling $9,000 were made in 1861.

The building is part of the Savannah Historic District. In a survey for the Historic Savannah Foundation, Mary Lane Morrison found the building to be of significant status.

== See also ==
- Buildings in Savannah Historic District
