= John Williams House (Savannah, Georgia) =

Historic house in Savannah, Georgia

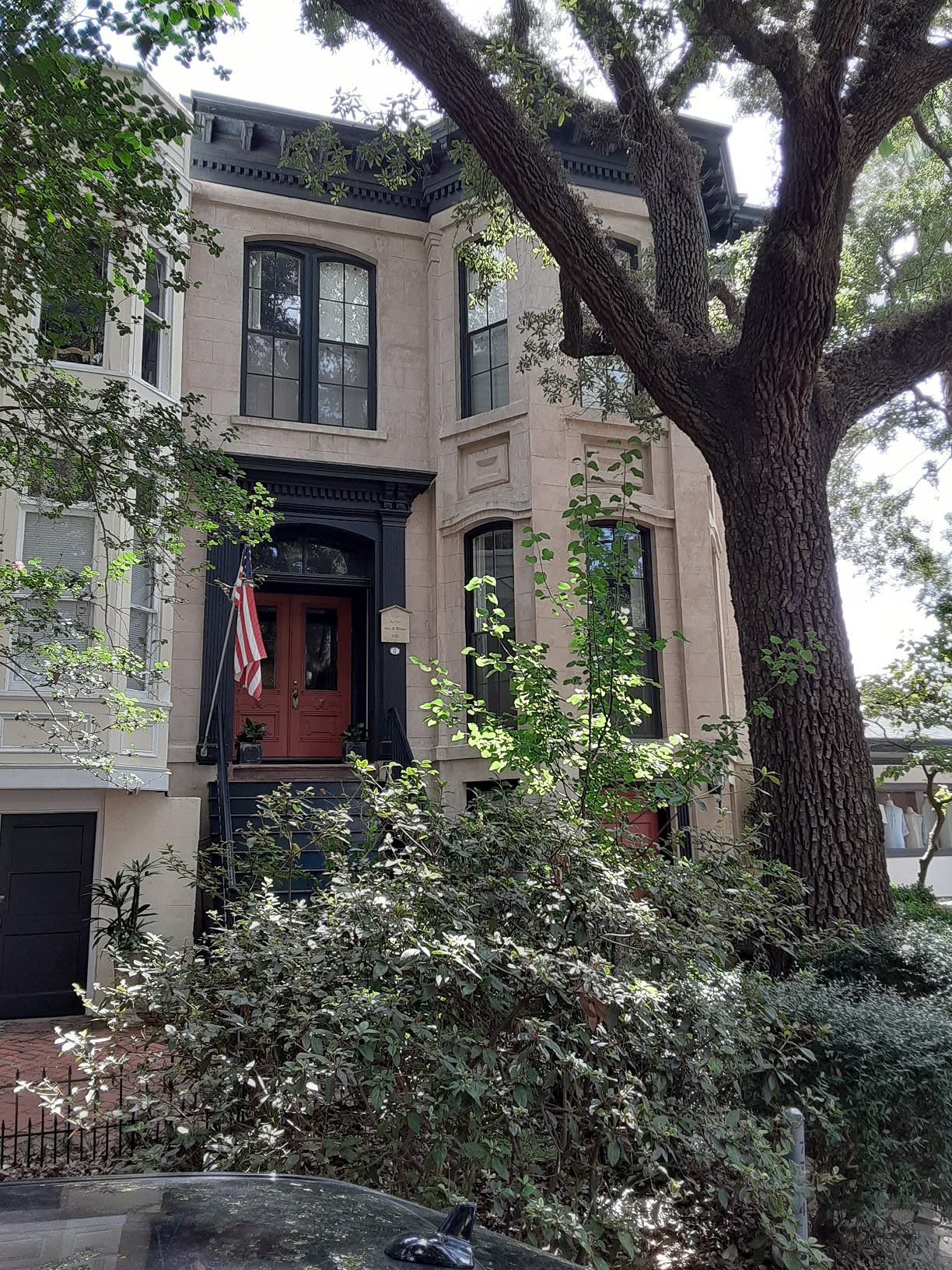
- The building in 2021
- Interactive map of the John Williams House area

General information
- Location: Savannah, Georgia, U.S., 17 West Jones Street
- Coordinates: 32.0724°N 81.0952°W
- Completed: 1883 (143 years ago)

Technical details
- Floor count: 3

The John Williams House is a home in Savannah, Georgia, United States. It is located at 17 West Jones Street and was constructed in 1883.

The building is part of the Savannah Historic District, and in a survey by the Historic Savannah Foundation, the building was found to be of significant status.

== See also ==
- Buildings in Savannah Historic District
