= McAlpin House =

McAlpin House may refer to any of the following structures:

- Hotel McAlpin, later the McAlpin House, on Broadway in Manhattan, New York
- McAlpin–Miller House, also known as the McAlpin House, 9 East 90th Street, Manhattan, New York
- McAlpin–Minot House, also known as the McAlpin House, 11 East 90th Street, Manhattan, New York
- Champion–McAlpin House, 122–124 West Jones Street, Savannah, Georgia
- Champion–McAlpin–Fowlkes House, 230 Barnard Street, Savannah, Georgia
