= Crystal Beer Parlor =

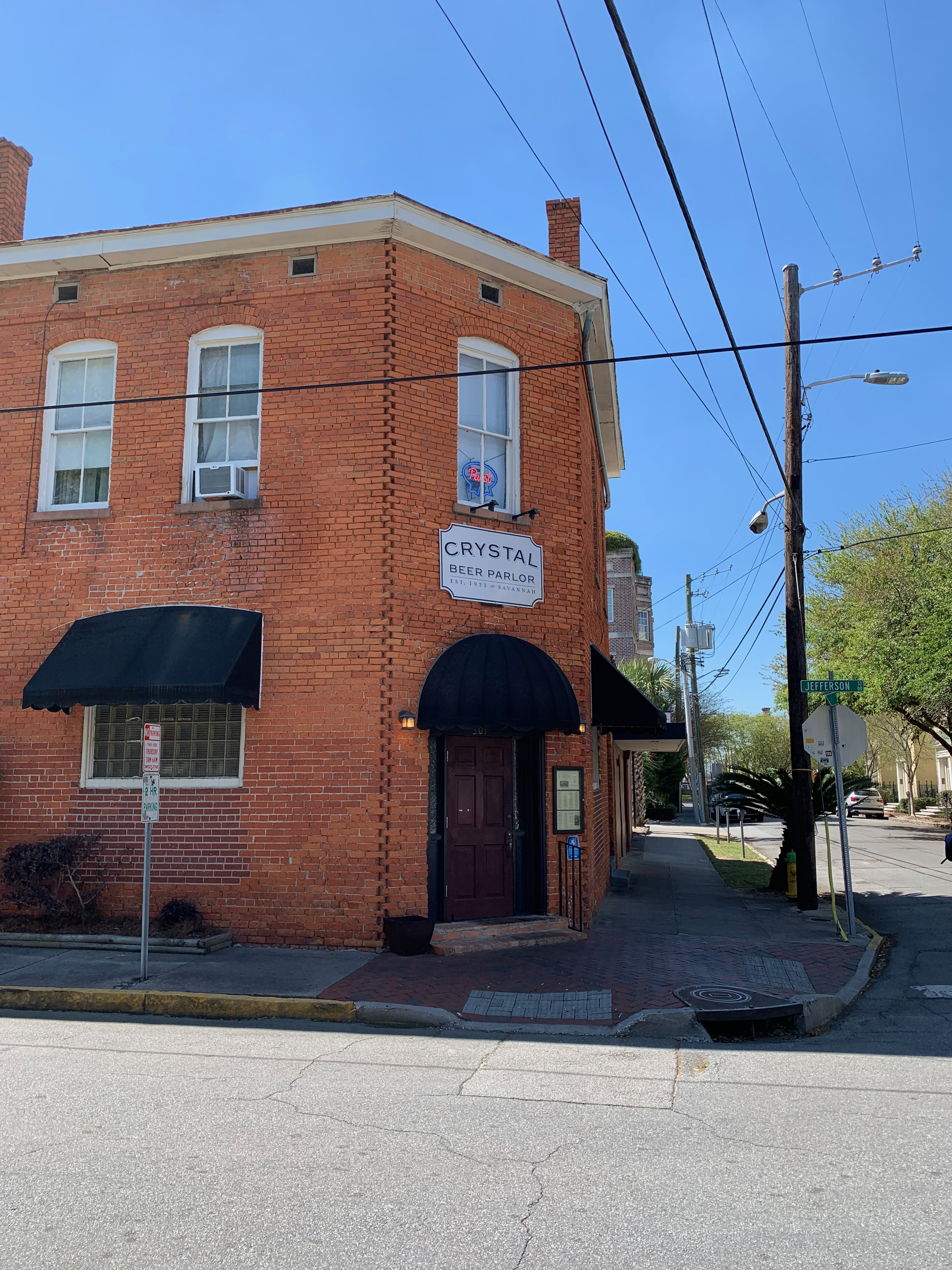
- The building's front entrance, at West Jones and Jefferson Streets, 2019
- Interactive map of the Crystal Beer Parlor area
- Former names: The Crystal

General information
- Location: Savannah, Georgia, U.S., 301 West Jones Street
- Coordinates: 32.073501°N 81.0979169°W
- Completed: c. 1900 (126 years ago)
- Owner: John Nichols (since 2009)

Technical details
- Floor count: 2

Crystal Beer Parlor is a restaurant and bar in Savannah, Georgia, United States. Located on West Jones Street, the building dates to around 1900, replacing a previous structure that burned in a fire. It is Savannah's oldest restaurant, and was once visited by Al Capone.

== History ==
In the early 1900s the building was the home of Gerken Family Grocery Store, operated by Julius Weitz and his siblings and parents.

As of 2021, Crystal Beer Parlor was Savannah's oldest restaurant, known as The Crystal in the early 1930s, when it was owned by William "Blocko" and Connie Manning. It was named for the Crystal Ice Company, which was located across the street.

The business became Crystal Beer Parlor "legally" in 1933; although it was possibly in business from 1928, during Prohibition. Al Capone visited the establishment around the time of Prohibition in the hopes of persuading "Blocko" to work for his organization.

The business was put up for sale at auction around 2000, but no buyers came forward. The building was empty for the next two years, until Buddy and Suzanne Kosic reopened it in late 2003. It was on the market again in 2008.

John Nichols purchased the business in 2009. After seeing the flyer reporting its availability, he threw it away; however, when he mentioned it to the staff at his catering company, they suggested he reconsider. The reopening in October 2009 was supposed to be a soft opening, but a reporter and a photographer were sent by the Savannah Morning News, which put the relaunch on its front page the next morning.

In November 2025, a fire started in a laundry bin at the restaurant.

== Reported hauntings ==
In early 2009, John Nichols was sitting at the bar with an interior designer. They both heard the sound of a person running in the apartment above them, even though they were the only people in the building. Nichols said that the running sound was so distinct that they were able to follow it with their eyes.

A few months later, a guest, who had spent time in the apartment as a child, told Nichols how the staff would bring up cocktails for Connie Manning. She would run down the hallway to meet them and get her drink.

Nichols also said a ghost-hunting group once visited the restaurant and discovered two characters. One was a young girl named Sarah, while a second spirit did not provide its name.

"They sensed the spirit with their equipment and asked, 'Who's there, what's your name?' There was silence for a while, and then finally they heard, 'Y'all ain't from around here, is ya?'," Nichols said.

== See also ==
- Buildings in Savannah Historic District
