= Historic Savannah: A Survey of Significant Buildings in the Historic and Victorian Districts of Savannah, Georgia =

1968 book

- Cover of the 1977 second edition
- Editor: Mary Lane Morrison
- Author: Historic Savannah Foundation
- Language: English
- Genre: Architecture
- Publisher: Historic Savannah Foundation
- Publication date: 1968
- Publication place: United States
- Pages: 299
- ISBN: 0-9610106-4-9

Historic Savannah: A Survey of Significant Buildings in the Historic and Victorian Districts of Savannah, Georgia is a book published by Historic Savannah Foundation in 1968 and regarded as a seminal work on the architecture of Savannah, Georgia, organized by ward. A second edition was released in 1977 and a third in 2005. The first two editions were edited by Mary Lane Morrison.

Each ward has an illustrated layout of its streets, with the placement of individual buildings.

== See also ==
- Buildings in Savannah Historic District
