= Jones Street (Savannah, Georgia) =

Street in Savannah, Georgia

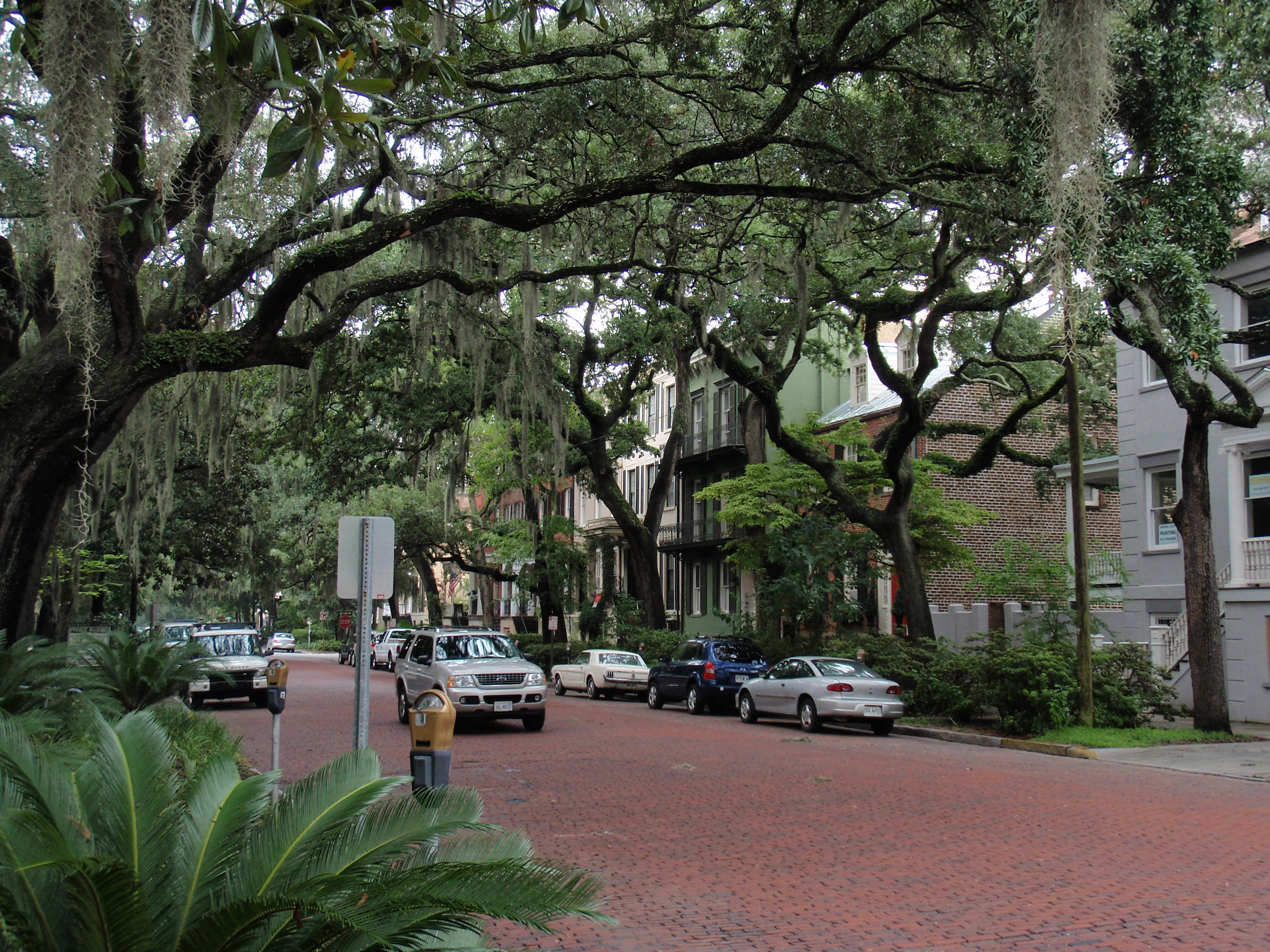
- Jones Street, 2010
- Interactive map of Jones Street
- Namesake: Major John Jones
- Length: 1.04 mi (1.67 km)
- Location: Savannah, Georgia, U.S.
- Coordinates: 32°4′21.02″N 81°5′40″W
- West end: West Boundary Street
- East end: East Broad Street

Jones Street is a historic street in Savannah, Georgia, United States. It is named for major John Jones, aide-de-camp to brigadier general Lachlan McIntosh at the 1779 siege of Savannah during the American Revolutionary War.

The street stretches just over 1 mile (1.6 km), from West Boundary Street in the west to East Broad Street in the east. It lies near the center of the Savannah Historic District. The street name changes at Bull Street, a north–south thoroughfare, becoming East Jones Street and West Jones Street, respectively. They separate Madison Square and Monterey Square, two of Bull Street's southernmost squares.

Jones Street has been described as one of the most charming streets in America. Several of its homes were built by John Scudder, who—with his brother, Ephraim—also built Scudder's Row on Monterey Square.

The street is interrupted between Martin Luther King Jr. Boulevard and Montgomery Street by an off-ramp from Interstate 16, allowing direct access to Savannah's Historic District at Montgomery Street.

In a 2016 study, Jones Street was one of several Savannah streets considered to be a "complete street" connection that "provide[d] safe, comfortable and convenient movement for pedestrians, bikes, vehicles, and alternative modes of transportation."

Jones Street passes through six wards (from west to east): Currie Town, Pulaski, Jasper, Lafayette, Troup and Bartow.

== Notable buildings ==
Below is a selection of notable buildings on Jones Street, many constructed for Eliza Ann Jewett (1779–1856). The majority of the buildings were erected in the 1850s, although another construction spike occurred in the 1880s. From west to east:

=== West Jones Street ===
Name	Image	Address	Year	Note
Crystal Beer Parlor		301 West Jones Street	1900 (circa)	An unrestored bar, The Crystal, dating to the early 1930s, owned by William and Connie Manning, now Crystal Beer Parlor. Prior to that, in the early 1900s it was the Gerken Family Grocery Store, operated by Julius Weitz and his siblings and parents
William Humphries Sr.	William Humphries House, 218	218–222 West Jones Street	1852	Built for William Humphries Sr. John Cusack's character, John Kelso, rents number 218 at the end of the 1997 movie Midnight in the Garden of Good and Evil. (The property was valued at $1.15 million in 2016.) He also attends a party at 115 East Jones Street, five blocks to the east, in the movie
Sarah Krenson Duplex		214–216 West Jones Street	1873	Built by Grimball and Chaplin
Elizabeth, Isaac & Jacob Cohen House		212 West Jones Street	1852	Built for Elizabeth, Isaac and Jacob Cohen. Since they were all minors at the time, it was likely a trust investment. By 1861 the property was owned by William Brantley, city alderman from 1860 to 1861. Charles W. Brunner later owned the property. Mansard roof added in 1872
Bernard Constantine Duplex		211–215 West Jones Street	1851	Built for successful butcher Bernard Constantine
Solomon Cohen (estate of) Property		208–210 West Jones Street	1886	
Jesse Mount Row House		207–209 West Jones Street	1856	Built for Jesse Mount for $18,000, the property was divided in 1861 and sold to J. W. Lathrop and Abraham Backer for $8,000 each
Isaac Brunner Property (2)		205 West Jones Street	1851	
Isaac Brunner Property (1)		203 West Jones Street	1852	
Anthony Basler Row House		128–132 West Jones Street	1851	
Jesse Mount House (sometimes known as the Champion-McAlpin House)		122–124 West Jones Street	1852	Built for Jesse Mount, a wing was added in 1857. It was owned by a Mrs. Maria McAlpin from 1859 to 1888. Maria's father, Aaron Champion, lived at the Harper Fowlkes House, at 230 Barnard Street, from 1843. Improvements totaling $9,000 were made in 1861
Solomon Zeigler House		121 West Jones Street	1856	Built for Solomon Zeigler
C. D. Rogers House		120 West Jones Street	1871	
John Murchison Property		114–116 West Jones Street	1851	Built for John Murchison
Louisa Nevitt Row House		113–117 West Jones Street	1851	Built for Louise Nevitt (d. 1890, aged 93). After her husband John's death the year after the construction, his widow moved to 125 East Jones as "a lady of leisure"
Caroline Overstreet House		111 West Jones Street	1855	
Mary Johnson House		109 West Jones Street	1900	
Algernon Hartridge Duplex; Mrs. Wilkes' Dining Room since 1943		105–107 West Jones Street	1869	A former boarding house, known as the Wilkes House
William Remshart Row House	102–104 106 108 110–112	102–112 West Jones Street	1853	
James Kerr House		20 West Jones Street	1849	Built for James Ker (possibly Kerr), the third storey was added in 1878
John Williams House		17 West Jones Street	1883	
Thomas Holcombe House		15 West Jones Street	1849	
Morris Sternberg House		12–14 West Jones Street	1891	By Alfred Eichberg
Joseph Johnston Property		11 West Jones Street	1854	Built for Joseph Johnston, the property was sold to Confederate officer Algernon S. Hartridge in 1860
Noah B. Knapp House		10 West Jones Street	1857	Designed by John S. Norris
Eliza Thompson House		5–7 West Jones Street	1847	Western portion added in 1889
Israel K. Tefft House		1 West Jones Street	1849	Built for Israel K. Tefft

=== East Jones Street ===
Name	Image	Address	Year	Note
Alexander A. Smets House		2–4 East Jones Street	1853	Built for Alexander Smets; designed by John S. Norris (now Savannah College of Art and Design's Morris Hall)
Cornelia Millen House		7 East Jones Street	1851	Built by John Scudder for a Miss Cornelia Millen, the building was later purchased by William Davidson, a liquor merchant and an officer with the Chatham Artillery; stoop replaced in 1908
Jacob Cohen Property		10–14 East Jones Street	1889	
John Scudder Property (1)		11 East Jones Street	1849–1851	Built by and for Scudder, the house was later sold to Charles S. Hardee for $4,500
John Scudder Property (2)		15 East Jones Street	1849–1851	Built by and for John Scudder, it was sold to William Wade in July 1860 for $5,000
Joe Odom House		16 East Jones Street	1847	Joe Odom was featured in the John Berendt non-fiction novel Midnight in the Garden of Good and Evil. A block south of Madison Square, this and 18 East Jones are two of the earliest constructions on the street
Quantock Row	Quantock Row 27 31	17–31 East Jones Street	1854 (circa)	Built for Allen William Quantock by John Scudder from 1852 to 1854, the property was sold to Henry Meinhard in 1862 who, in turn, sold it to Gerard and Sarah Treanor
Eliza Ann Jewett Property		18 East Jones Street	1847	Built around the same time as the Joe Odom House next door (number 16), the two being amongst the earliest constructions on Jones Street
Eliza Ann Jewett (Estate of) Property		20–22 East Jones Street	1861	Erected out of the estate of Eliza Jewett, built for her granddaughter in 1861
John Howell House		24 East Jones Street	1858; balcony added in 1875	Built for John B. Howell and sold to John Lama in 1862 for $5,000
Hunter-Charlton House		101 East Jones Street	1870	
Sarah Gazan House		103 East Jones Street	1891	
Margaret Dibble House (west half)		107 East Jones Street	1853	Built for Margaret Dibble and/or Bridget Carey
Margaret Dibble House (east half)		109 East Jones Street	1853	Built for Margaret Dibble and/or Bridget Carey
David Cohen House		108 East Jones Street	1853	Built for David Lopez Cohen (1820–1893), a successful ship builder from Charleston, South Carolina. He also built the Shearit Israel Synagogue at 34 Wentworth Street in Charleston. He is interred in Laurel Grove Cemetery
Eliza Ann Jewett Row House (Calhoun Ward)	111–115 Close-up of 115	111–115 East Jones Street	1852–1853	Built for Eliza Jewett. 115 featured in the 1997 movie Midnight in the Garden of Good and Evil as the venue for the party hosted by Joe Odom
Eliza Ann Jewett Row House (Lafayette Ward)	112–116 Close-up of 116	112–120 East Jones Street	1852	Built for Eliza Jewett
Eliza Ann Jewett Row House (Calhoun Ward)		117–119 East Jones Street	1854	Built for Eliza Jewett
Augustus Barié Property		123 East Jones Street	1855	Built for Augustus Barié; bay window added in 1876
Mary Grimball House		124 East Jones Street	1850	Built for Mary Grimball, wife of a planter from the Isle of Hope. Sold in 1855 to William Chaplin, who lived here until 1883
Francis Waver House		125 East Jones Street	1856	
Abram Minis House		204 East Jones Street	1859	Built for Abram Minis; designed by Stephen Decatur Button
Francis Ruckert Property		207–211 East Jones Street	1866	
James Snider House		208 East Jones Street	1856	Cornices and veranda added in 1877
Mary Perry Row House		212–218 East Jones Street	1853	
Thomas Holcombe Duplex		213–215 East Jones Street	1853	
Augustus Barié Property	Full shot Sign on the corner of 222 East Jones at Lincoln Street	222 East Jones Street	1857	Built for Augustus Barié, sold to George Dillon in December 1857 for $5,500. By 1859, Dillon had sold the property to John Cunningham, who kept it until 1873
James Graybill House		223 East Jones Street	1866	
John Schwarz House		302–306 East Jones Street	1890	
Eliza McCormack House		308 East Jones Street	1898	
Augustus Bonard Row House		313–317 East Jones Street	1868	By M. Williams
John Richardson Duplex		316–318 East Jones Street	1852	
Sarah Bailey Property		321–323 East Jones Street	1853	
Charles Barnwall/Sabra Ulmer Duplex		401–405 East Jones Street	1856	
Paulson & Morgan Row House		407–413 East Jones Street	1875	
J. J. Dale Duplex (Troup Ward)		408–410 East Jones Street	1883	By William Noonan
J.J. Dale Duplex (Wesley Ward)		415–417 East Jones Street	1883	
John Asendorf Property (west)		418 East Jones Street	1863	By William Noonan
John Asendorf Property (east)		420–424 East Jones Street	1867	By William Noonan
Frederick Klug House		427–429 East Jones Street	1879	
James Cann Property	502 504	502–504 East Jones Street	1861	Built for James F. Cann. 502 was a commercial building; 504 was residential
Charles & Joseph Fulton House		503–505 East Jones Street	1872	
Silas Fulton Property (1)		507–509 East Jones Street	1860	Built for Silas Fulton
Robert Low Property (1)		510 East Jones Street	1870	Built by Robert Low
James Bandy Property		511–513 East Jones Street	1861	Built for James W. Bandy
Robert Low Property (2)		512 East Jones Street	1867	
Abraham Backer Duplex		514–516 East Jones Street	1867	
Silas Fulton Property (2)		515–517 East Jones Street	1860	Built for Silas Fulton
Joseph Bandy Property (1)		519–525 East Jones Street	1866	
George Bulloch & Cyrus Campfield Property		520–522 East Jones Street	1867	
Joseph Bandy Property (2)		527–529 East Jones Street	1868	
Anna Bella Robertson Property		530–534 East Jones Street	1885	
Thomas Ford Property (1)		538 East Jones Street	1871	
Thomas Ford Property (2)		540 East Jones Street	1871	
