= Eliza Ann Jewett =

American real-estate investor

- Born: Eliza Ann Cleary; March 1779; North Carolina, United States
- Died: October 30, 1856 (aged 77)

Eliza Ann Jewett (née Cleary; March 1779 – October 30, 1856) was an American real-estate investor. Several properties in Savannah, Georgia, where she was based, are now named for her. Her most active years were during the mid-19th century, when she was beyond the age of 70. After Mary Magdalene Marshall, Jewett was the most prominent female property owner and developer in antebellum Savannah.

== Life and career ==
Eliza Ann Cleary was born in 1779 in North Carolina.

In 1808, she married James H. Discombe, with whom she had four known children. One of them, Eliza Ann Bowles, married Francis Champion. In 1817, two years after Discombe's death, she married Jasper Jewett, with whom she had two children before his death in 1819.

She was not an heiress and was not known to have inherited much wealth from her parents but, according to Roulhac Toledano, "She understood the value of real estate in Savannah during its golden age, between 1840 and the Civil War." Comparisons have been drawn between Jewett and Mary Magdalene Marshall, a contemporary real-estate investory, but Jewett "maintained a lower social profile and does not appear to have been very active in the city's civic and philanthropic scene."

Most active in the 1850s, in her 70s, she had constructed several homes on Savannah's Jones Street, which has since been described as one of the most charming streets in America.

== Death ==
Jewett died in 1856, aged 77. Her funeral was held at her 326 Bull Street home in Madison Square, Savannah.

== Selected properties ==
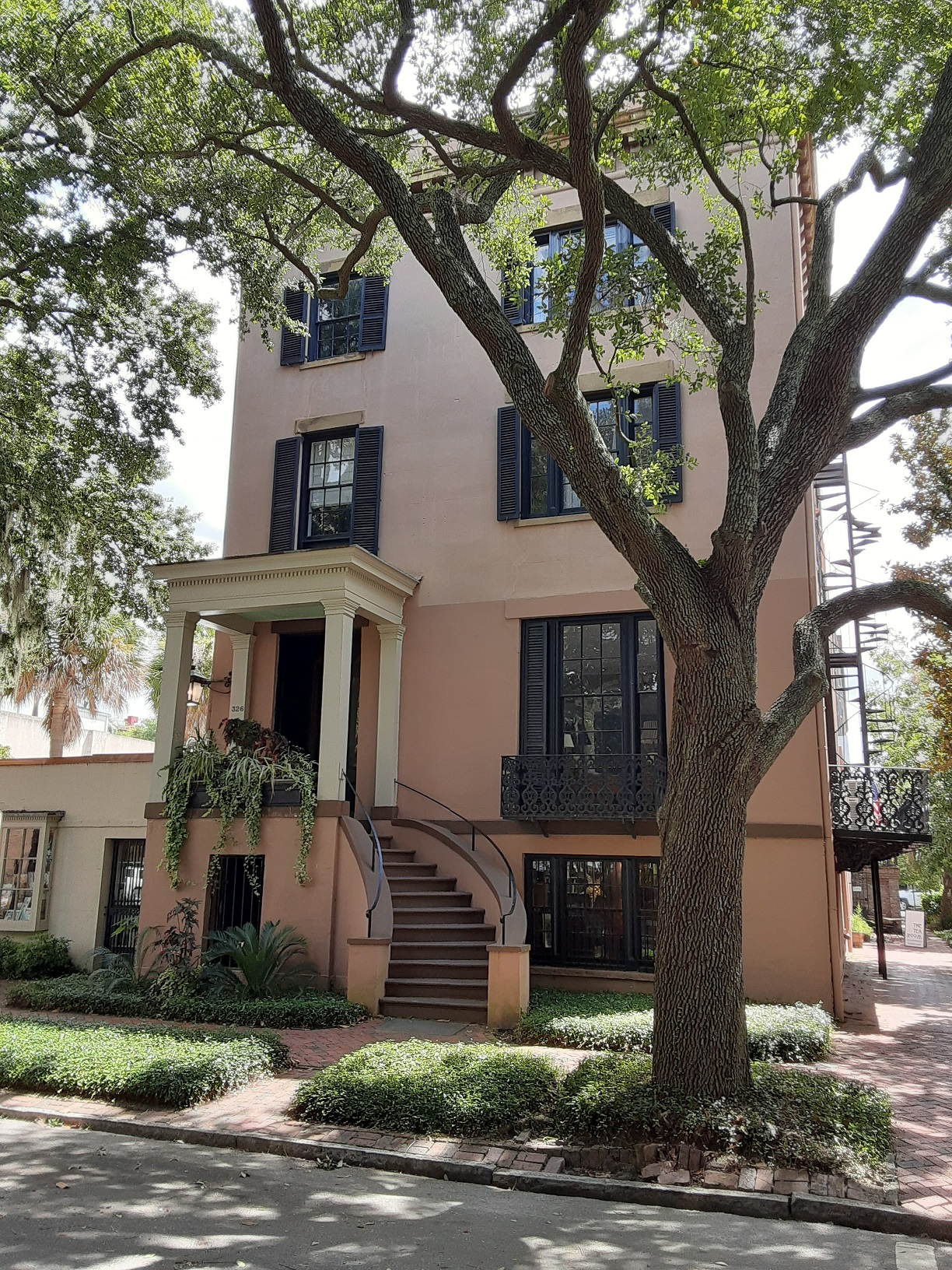
326 Bull Street, in Savannah's Madison Square

Jewett had built the below properties in Savannah, some of which she also lived in.

- Eliza Jewett House, 326 Bull Street (1843)
- Eliza Ann Jewett Property, 20–22 West Harris Street (1843)
- 16 East Jones Street, also known as the "Joe Odom House" (1847)
- Eliza Ann Jewett Property, 18 East Jones Street (1847)
- Eliza Ann Jewett Row House, 112–120 East Jones Street (1852)
- Eliza Ann Jewett Row House, 111–115 East Jones Street (1853)
- Eliza Ann Jewett Row House, 18–24 East Macon Street (1853)
- Eliza Ann Jewett Property, 117–119 East Jones Street (1854)
- (Estate of) Eliza Ann Jewett Property, 20–22 East Jones Street (1861)
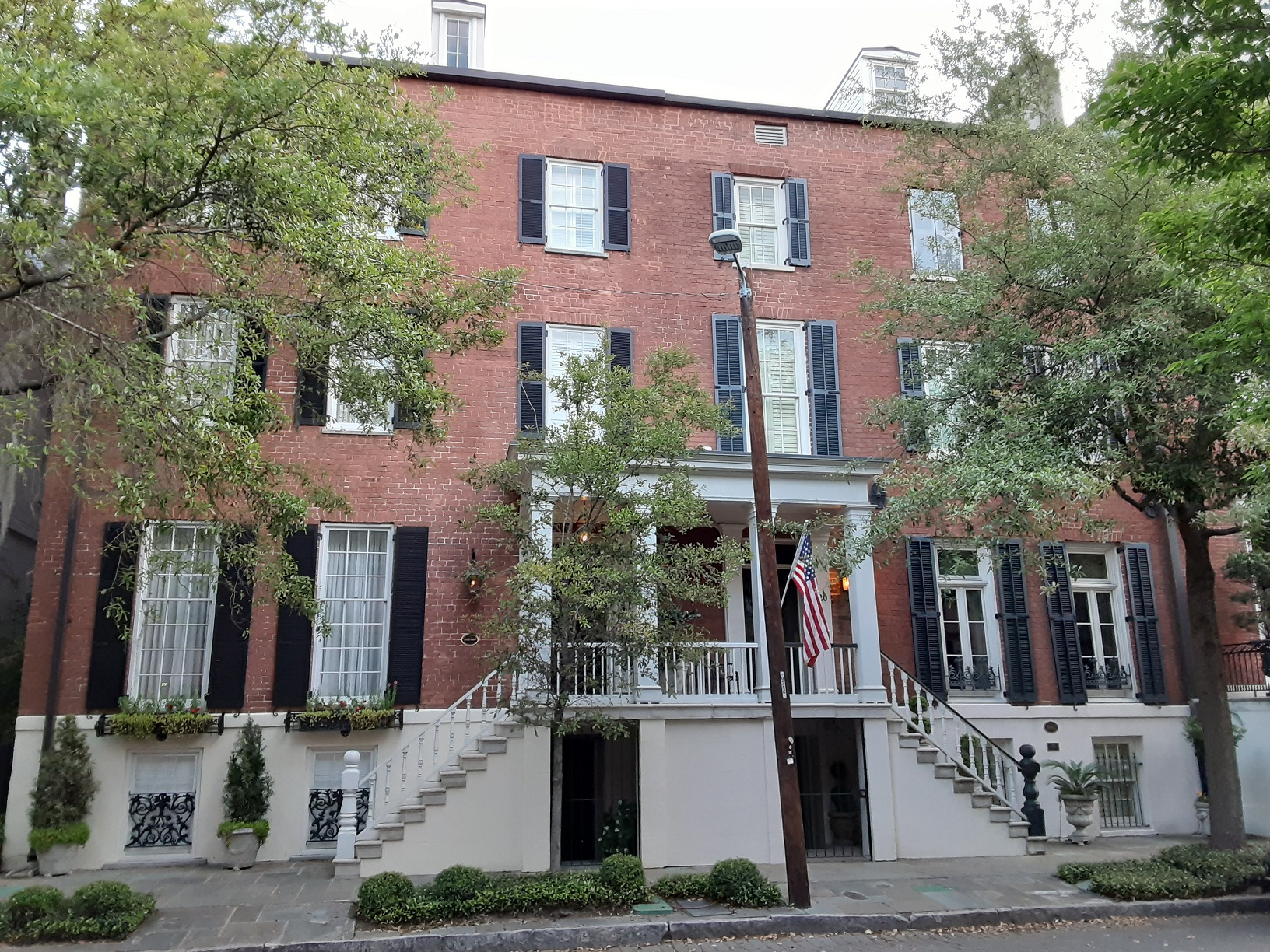
20–22 West Harris Street

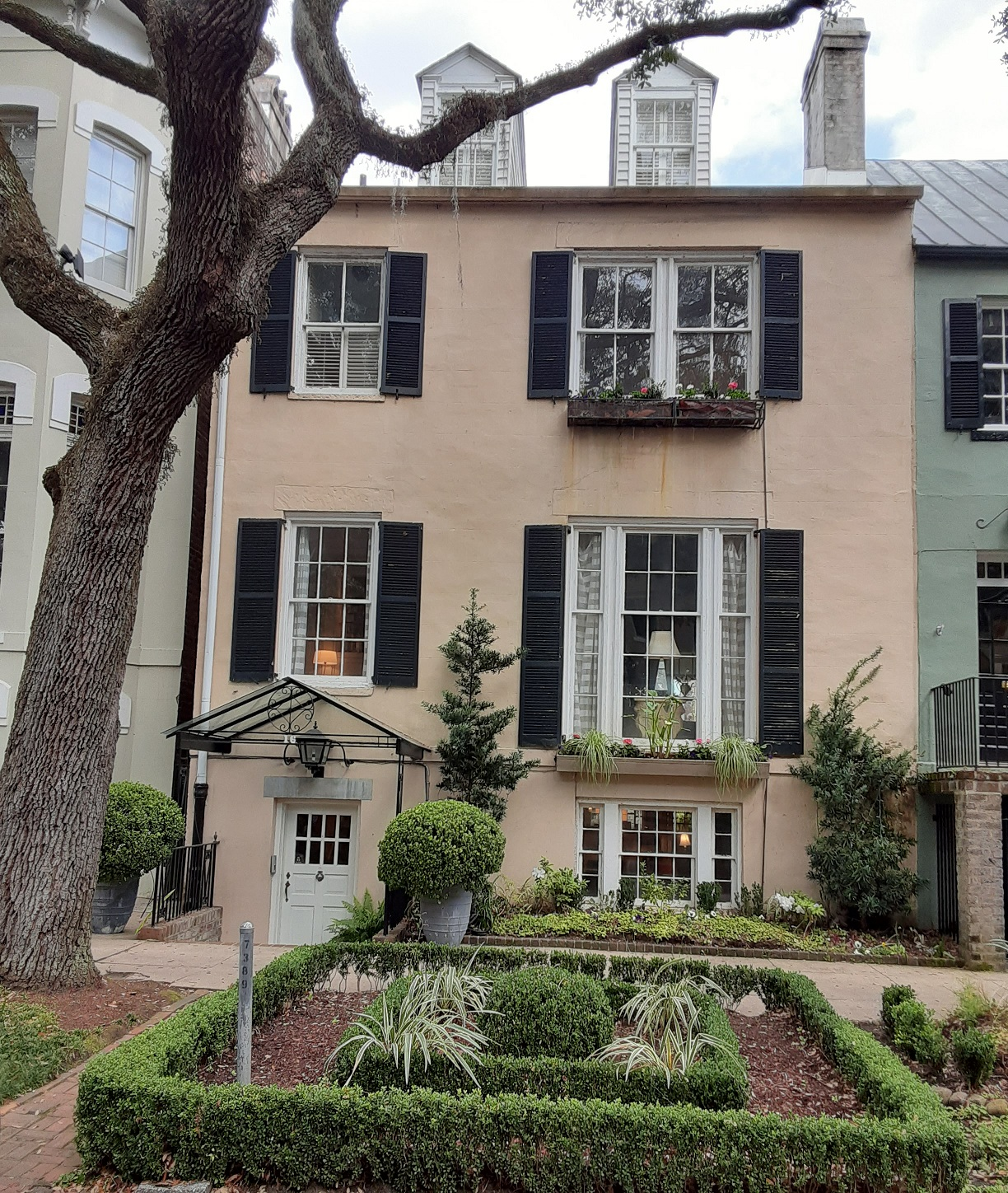
16 East Jones Street

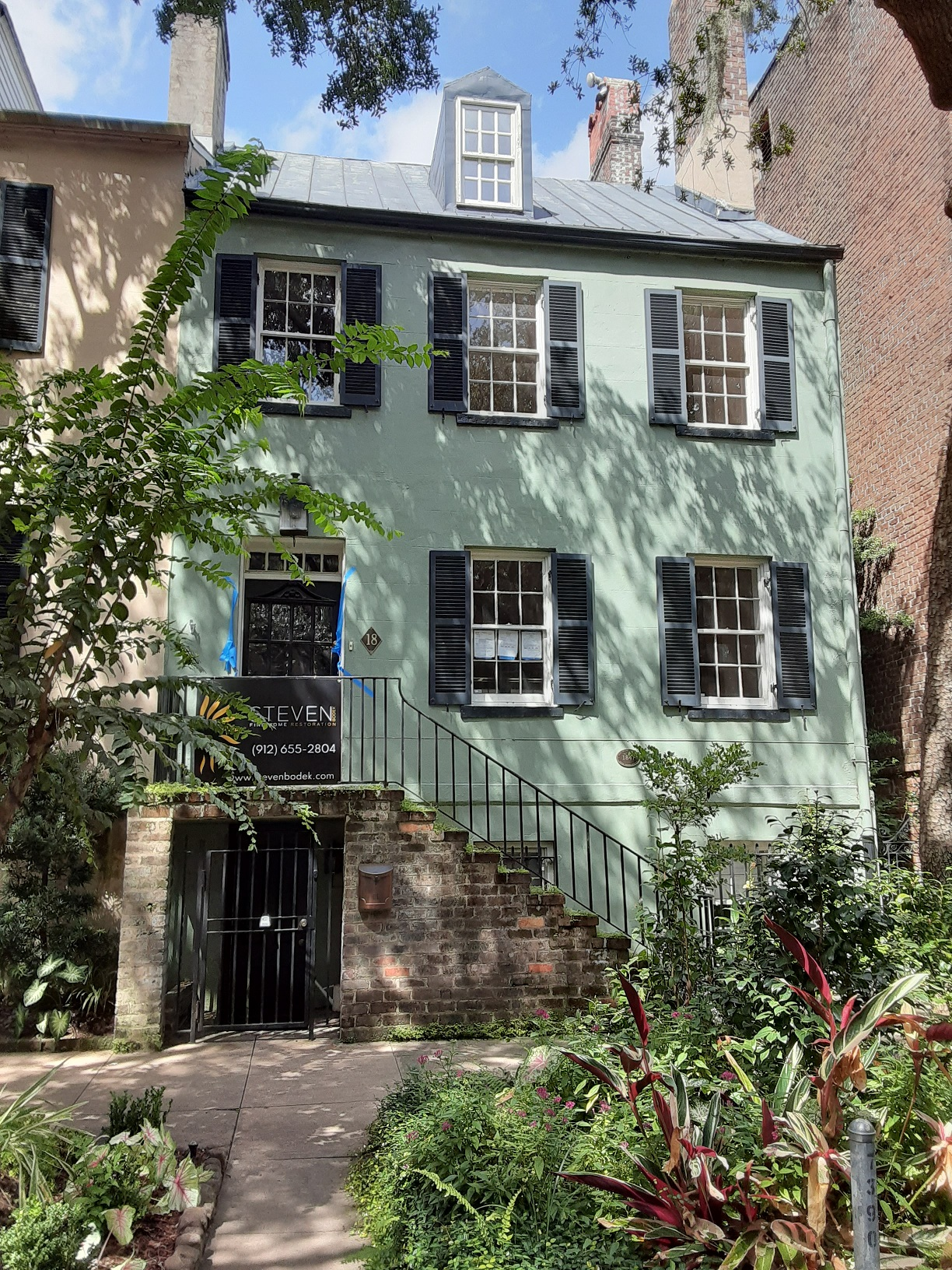
18 East Jones Street

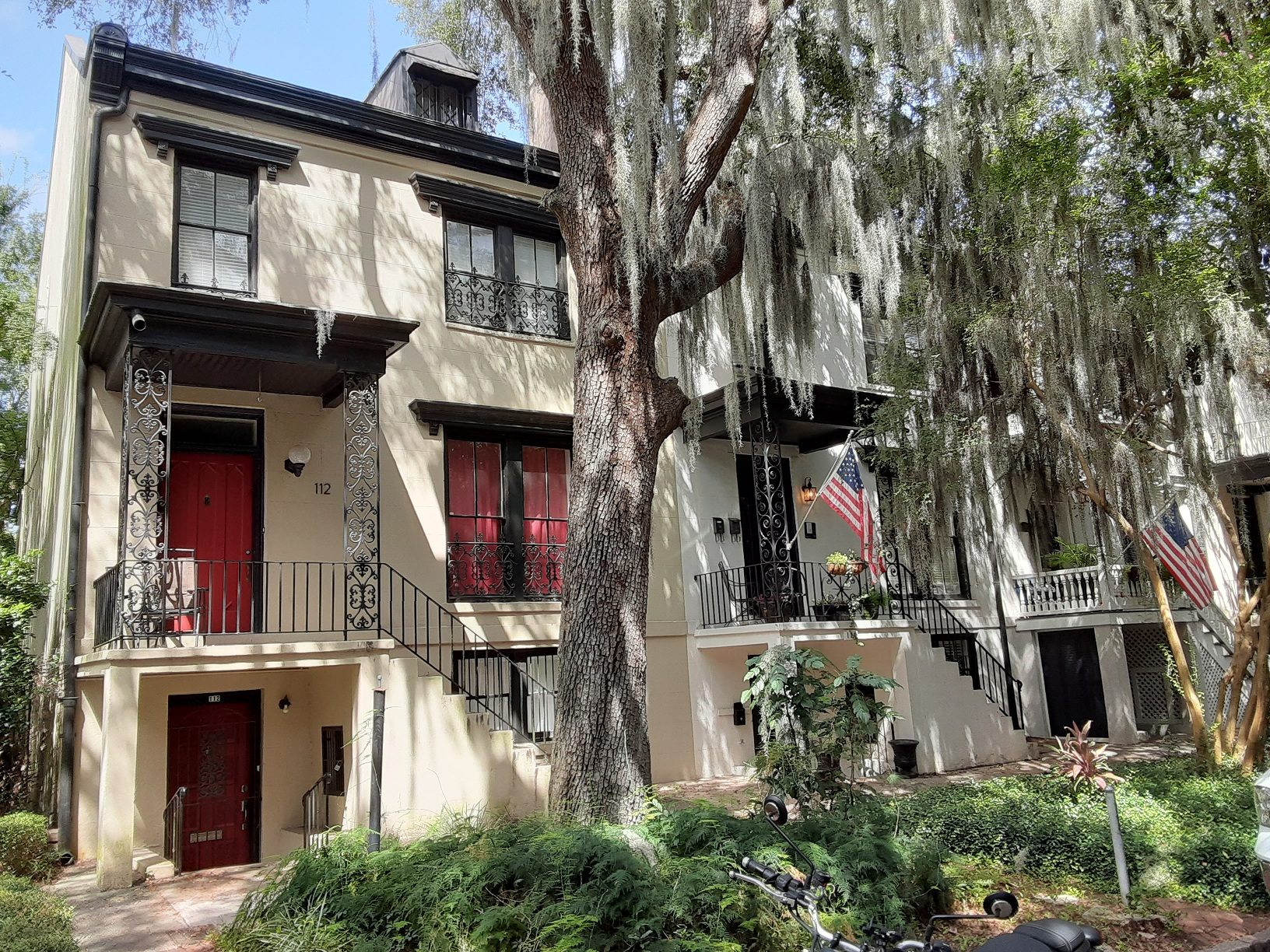
112–120 East Jones Street

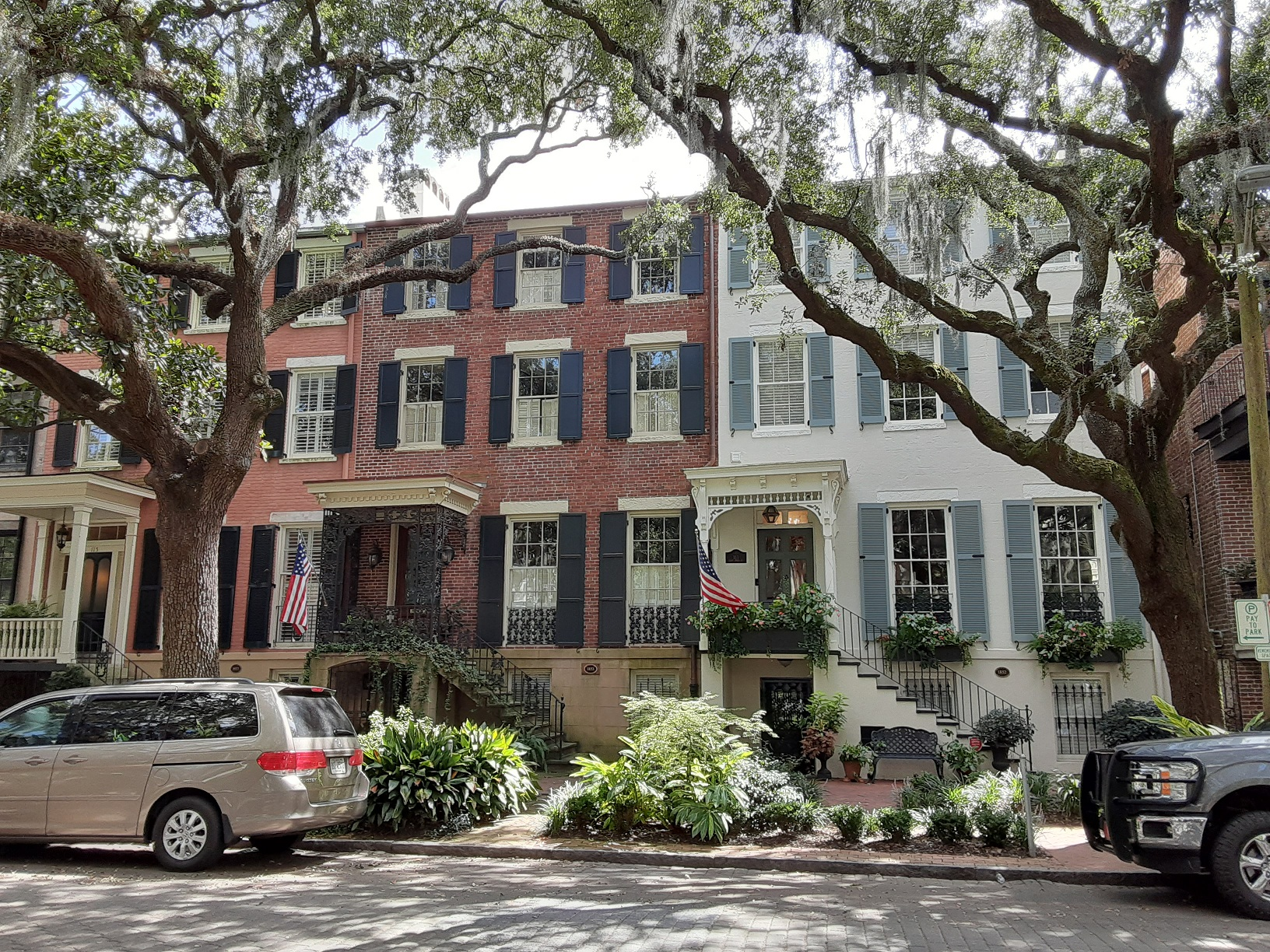
111–115 East Jones Street

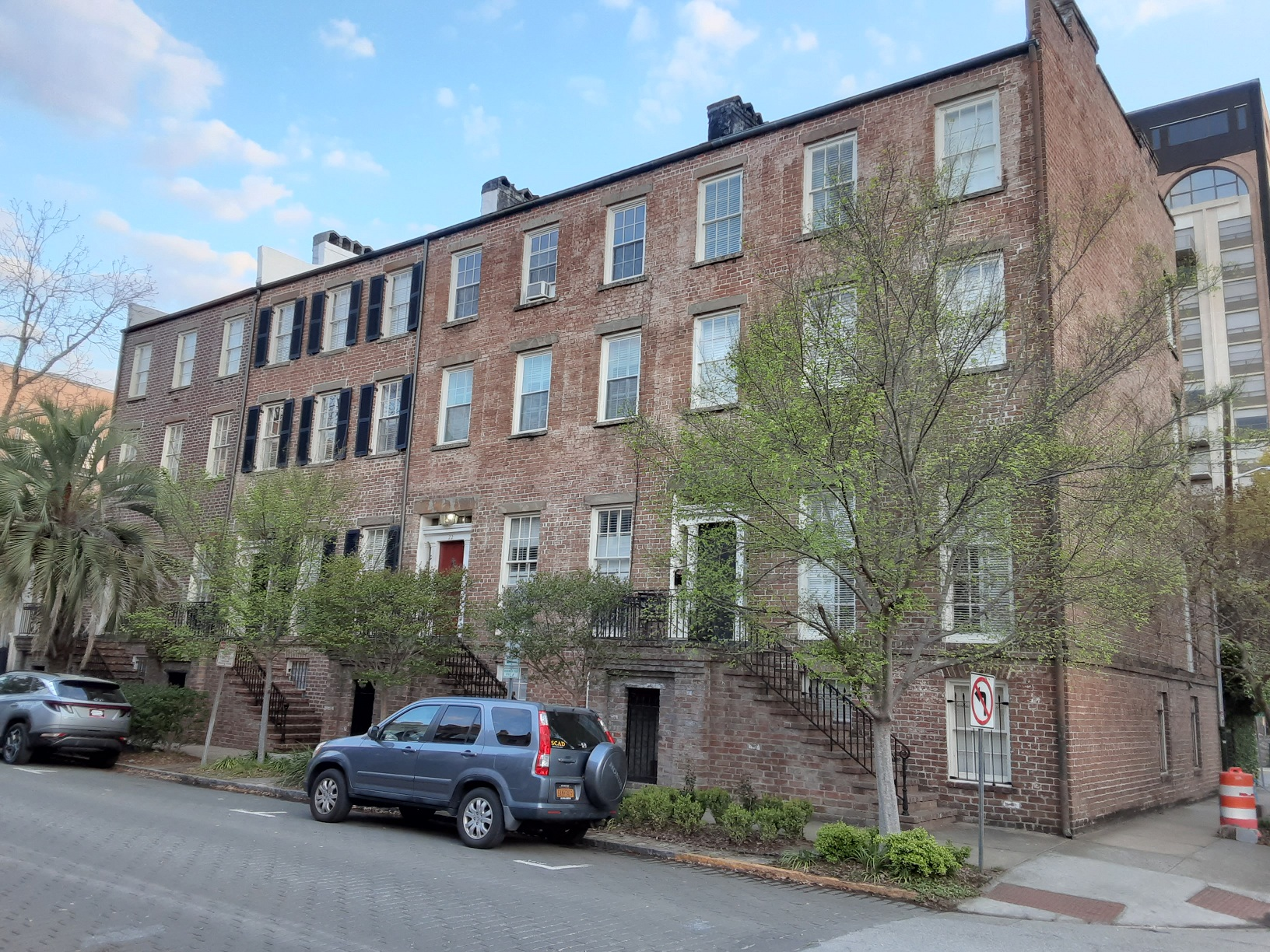
18–24 East Macon Street

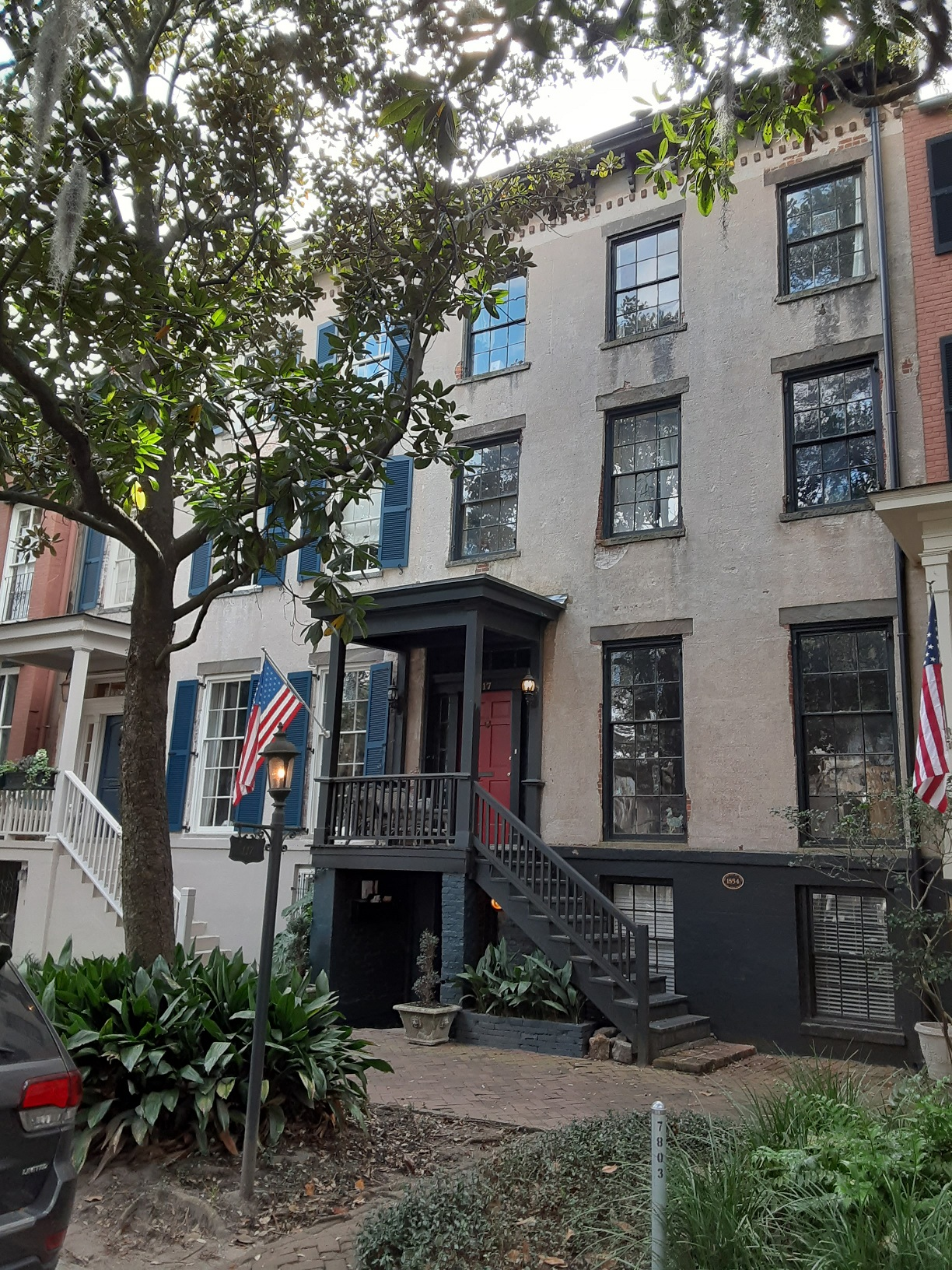
117–119 East Jones Street

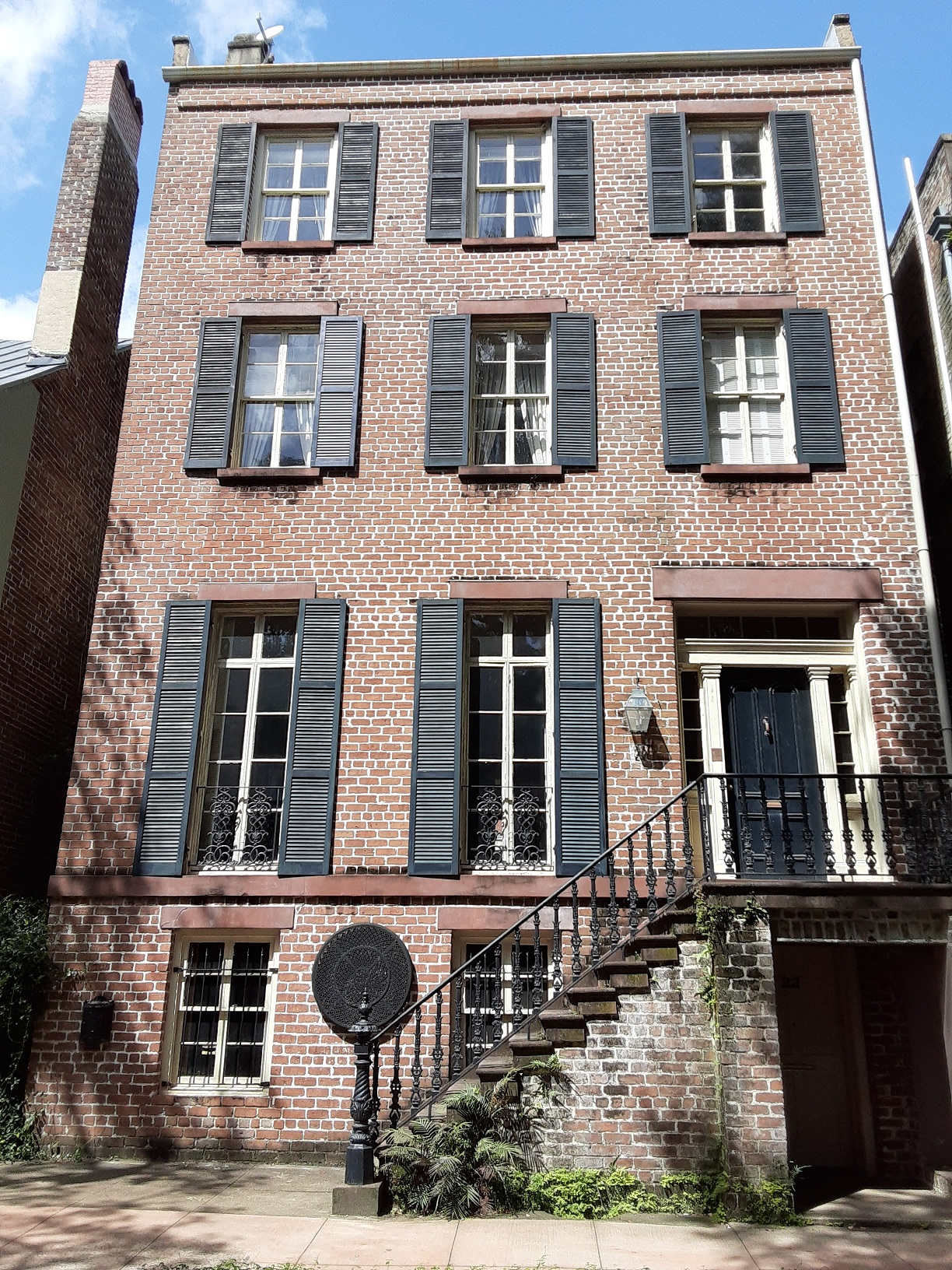
20–22 East Jones Street
