= John Schwarz House =

Historic house in Savannah, Georgia

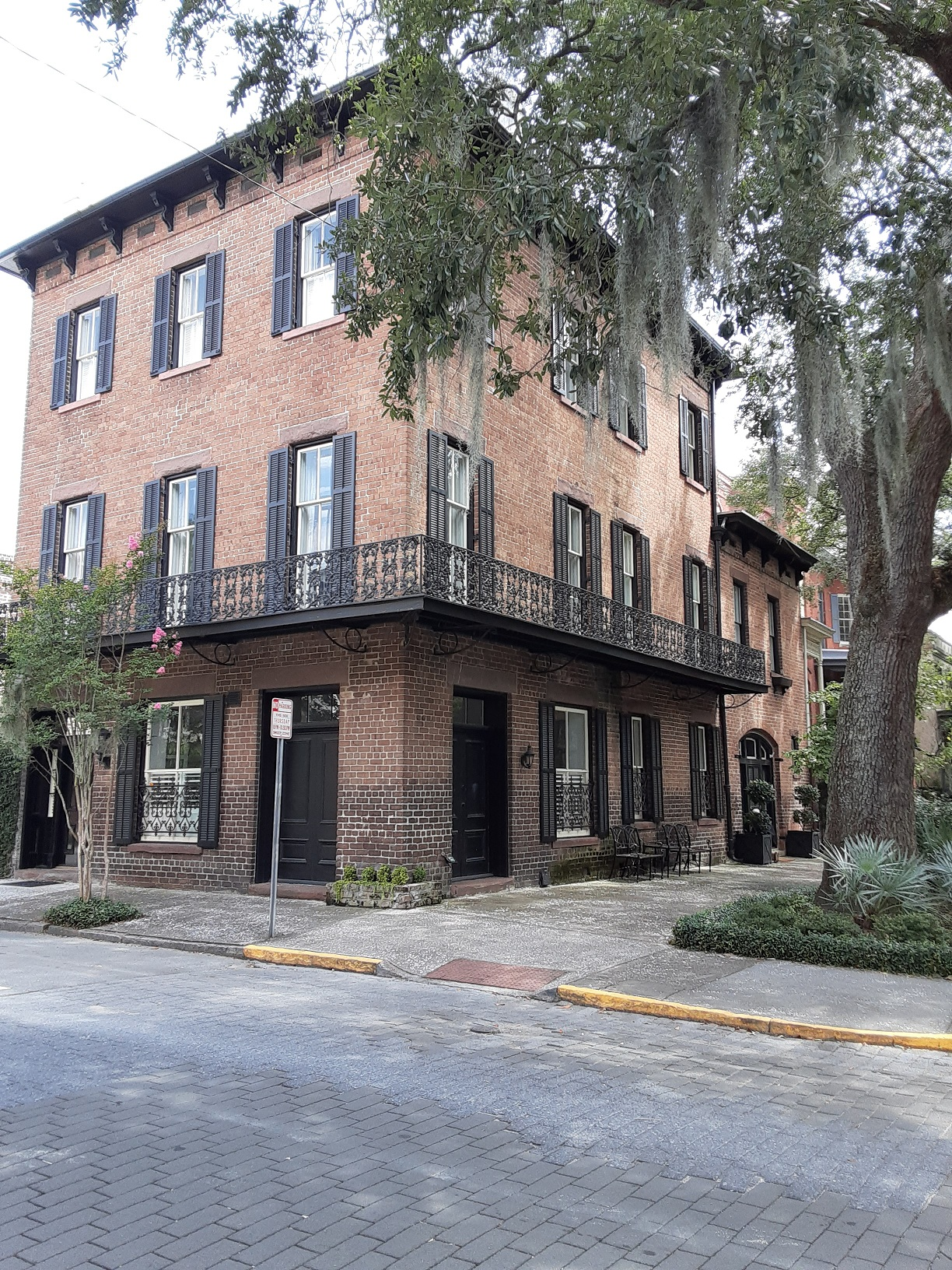
- The building in 2021
- Interactive map of the John Schwarz House area

General information
- Location: Savannah, Georgia, U.S., 302–306 East Jones Street
- Coordinates: 32.0717°N 81.0908°W
- Completed: 1890 (136 years ago)

Technical details
- Floor count: 3

The John Schwarz House is a home in Savannah, Georgia, United States. Built in 1890, it is located at 302–306 East Jones Street.

The building is part of the Savannah Historic District.

The home was built for John Schwarz, the 41st mayor of Savannah.

== See also ==
- Buildings in Savannah Historic District
