= Jane Adair Wright =

American preservationist

- Born: January 17, 1901; Hillsboro, Ohio, U.S.
- Died: March 3, 1991 (aged 90); Chatham County, U.S.
- Occupation: Preservationist

Jane Adair Wright (January 17, 1901 – March 3, 1991) was an American preservationist. In 1955, she became one of the seven all-female founders of Historic Savannah Foundation.

== Early life ==
Wright was born in 1901 in Hillsboro, Ohio, to Reverend David Cady Wright and Jane Adair Smith. Wright's family moved to Savannah, Georgia, when her father was appointed rector of Christ Episcopal Church.

She graduated from Randolph–Macon Women's College, in Ashland, Virginia, in the early 1920s.

== Career ==
Wright was the curator of the Owens–Thomas House from its foundation as a museum in 1954 to 1963. In 1955, she became one of the seven all-female founders of Historic Savannah Foundation. She was also a founder of Savannah's Junior League.

== Personal life ==
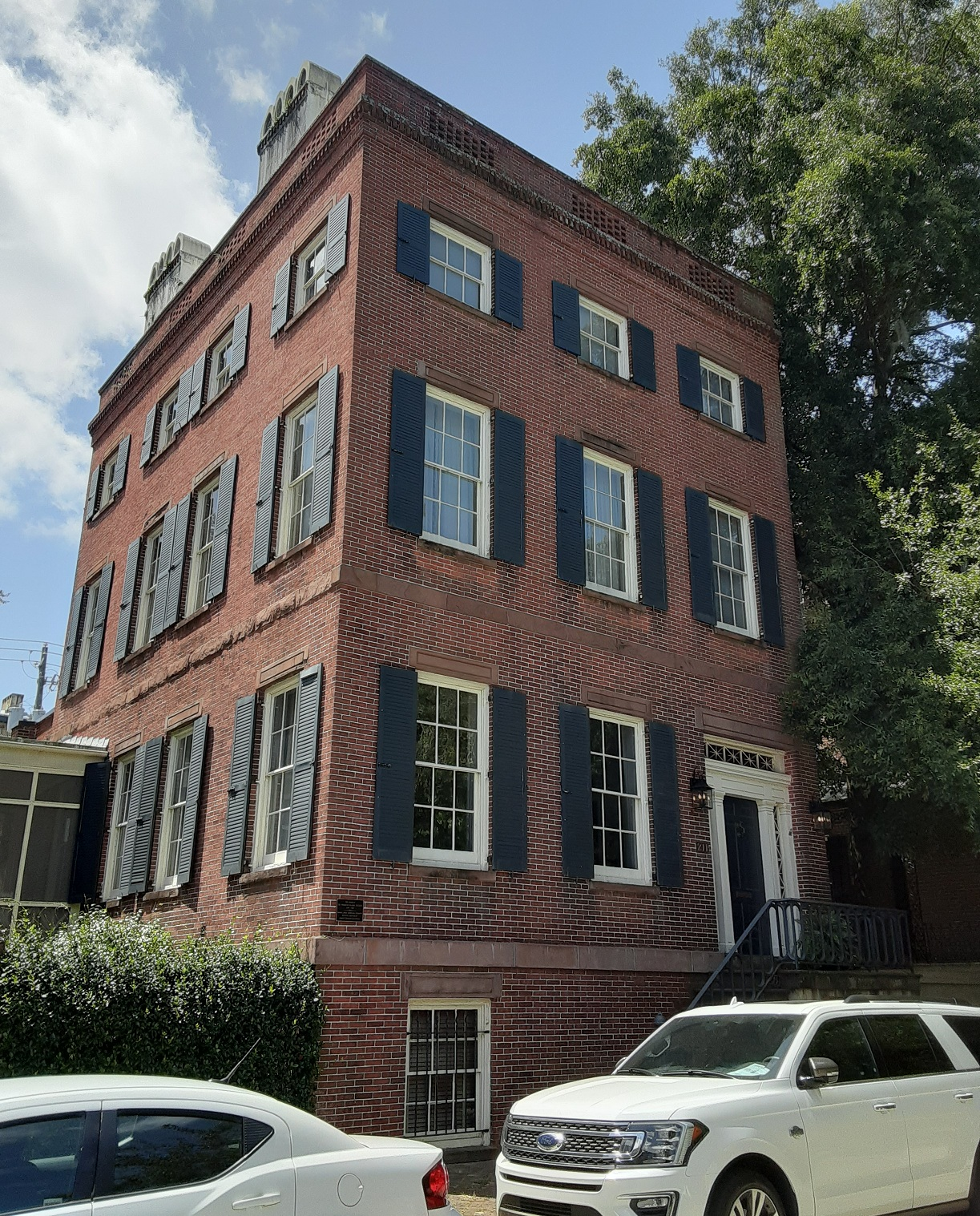
Wright lived at 211 East Gordon Street in Savannah, today known as the Jane Young House.

Wright was a member of the Georgia Historical Society and the Trustees' Garden Club.

In 1929, Wright was living at 211 East York Street in Savannah; she later lived at 224 East Gordon Street.

== Death ==
Wright died in 1991, aged 90. She is interred in a family plot at Saint John In the Wilderness Cemetery in Flat Rock, Henderson County, North Carolina, where her parents owned a summer cottage.
