= Algernon Hartridge =

Confederate Army lieutenant (1831–1876)

- Born: Algernon Sydney Hartridge; August 4, 1831; Savannah Beach, Georgia, U.S.
- Died: April 4, 1876 (aged 44); Savannah, Georgia, U.S.
- Burial place: Laurel Grove Cemetery, Savannah, Georgia, U.S.
- Military career
- Allegiance: Confederate States
- Branch: Confederate States Army

Algernon Sydney Hartridge (August 4, 1831 – April 4, 1876) was a cotton merchant and lieutenant in the Confederate States Army during the American Civil War.

== Life and career ==
Hartridge was born in 1831 to Charles Hartridge and Mary Hubbard Green. He was one of their three sons, the others being Julian and Alfred.

In 1855, he married Susan Enoch Knight. They had five children: Ada, Charles, Gazaway, Algernon Jr. and a stillborn child in 1863. Algernon Jr. died aged six months.

His family were members of Christ Church on Bull Street in Savannah, Georgia.

Hartridge set up a cotton factor business at 92 Bay Street. He also became a member of the Savannah Chamber of Commerce, as well as serving on the board of the Oglethorpe Insurance Company in 1864, of the Savannah National Bank (from 1865 to 1868), of the Tyler Cotton Press Company (1871) and of the Central Railroad and Banking Company of Georgia (from 1871 to 1876).

On June 4, 1861, a meeting was held to elect officers of the DeKalb Riflemen Company A. Algernon was elected first lieutenant; his brother, Alfred, was elected a captain.

In 1868, Hartridge had built the row house at 202–206 East Gaston Street in Savannah. Other buildings he owned include the property at 119 East Charlton Street (built in 1852), the Algernon Hartridge Duplex at 105–107 West Jones Street (1869) and the Algernon Hartridge House at 516 Abercorn Street (1870), a block east of Forsyth Park. The latter property is now known as Keys Hall, part of the Savannah College of Art and Design.

== Death ==
Hartridge died from hepatitis in Savannah in 1876, aged 44. After a funeral at Christ Church on April 7, he was interred in the city's Laurel Grove Cemetery. His pallbearers included Joseph E. Johnston, Confederate general, and Henry R. Jackson, major general. His wife joined him there upon her death nine years later. She had been declared insane in 1888, two years after she had become a widow. Her son, Charles, became her guardian.
