= Mary Lane Morrison =

American historian

- Born: August 15, 1907; Savannah, Georgia, U.S.
- Died: July 16, 1994 (aged 86); Savannah, Georgia, U.S.
- Occupations: Author, historian, preservationist

Mary Lane Morrison (August 15, 1907 – July 16, 1994) was an American writer, historian and preservationist. She was the curator of the Georgia Historical Society, a member of the National Society of the Colonial Dames of America in the state of Georgia and was a director in The Victorian Society, founded in 1966. She also wrote John S. Norris: Architect in Savannah, on the architectural work of John S. Norris, and edited Historic Savannah: A Survey of Significant Buildings in the Historic and Victorian Districts of Savannah, Georgia.

== Biography ==
Morrison was born in Savannah, Georgia, in 1907, the daughter of Mills Bee Lane Sr. (1860–1945) and Mary Comer Lane (1881–1966). She was the sister of Mills Jr., Hugh, Edward and Remer Young Lane (1910–1984). She was also the granddaughter of Hugh Comer (1842–1900), who died seven years before she was born.

On May 10, 1941, she married Howard Jackson Morrison (1905–1965), a lieutenant commander in the United States Navy, with whom she had two sons — Howard J. Morrison Jr. (1943–2019) and Mills Lane Morrison — and a daughter, Mary Morrison Clarke (1948–2011).

Lane graduated from Smith College in 1929. That same year, her photographs from around Savannah were shown at the Barcelona International Exposition.

Morrison became very active in the preservation community in Savannah. She received an award for Outstanding Achievement in the Field of Preservation from the Georgia Trust for Historic Preservation. The Trust stated that her work had "a major impact in documenting the architecture of Savannah. Virtually every building's date of original construction is known, as well as the name of the builders, with specific reference to date of construction and appropriate architectural style." Each of her children also received the Georgia Trust's Preservation Award for Excellence for the Lebanon Plantation, a long-time family home. Morrison's son, Howard, and his wife, Mary Reynolds Morrison, later owned the property, the third generation of the family to do so.

== Death and legacy ==
Morrison died in 1994, aged 86. She is buried, beside her husband and family, in Savannah's Bonaventure Cemetery.

A year following her death, the Mary Lane Morrison Endowment was established by her family "to honor her love of and commitment to Georgia history."

In 2018, the Savannah College of Art and Design (SCAD) inducted Morrison into its Savannah Women of Vision program.

== Publications ==
- John S. Norris: Architect in Savannah (1980) ASIN B0039ZS2OE
