= Historic Savannah Foundation =

Historical society in Georgia, USA

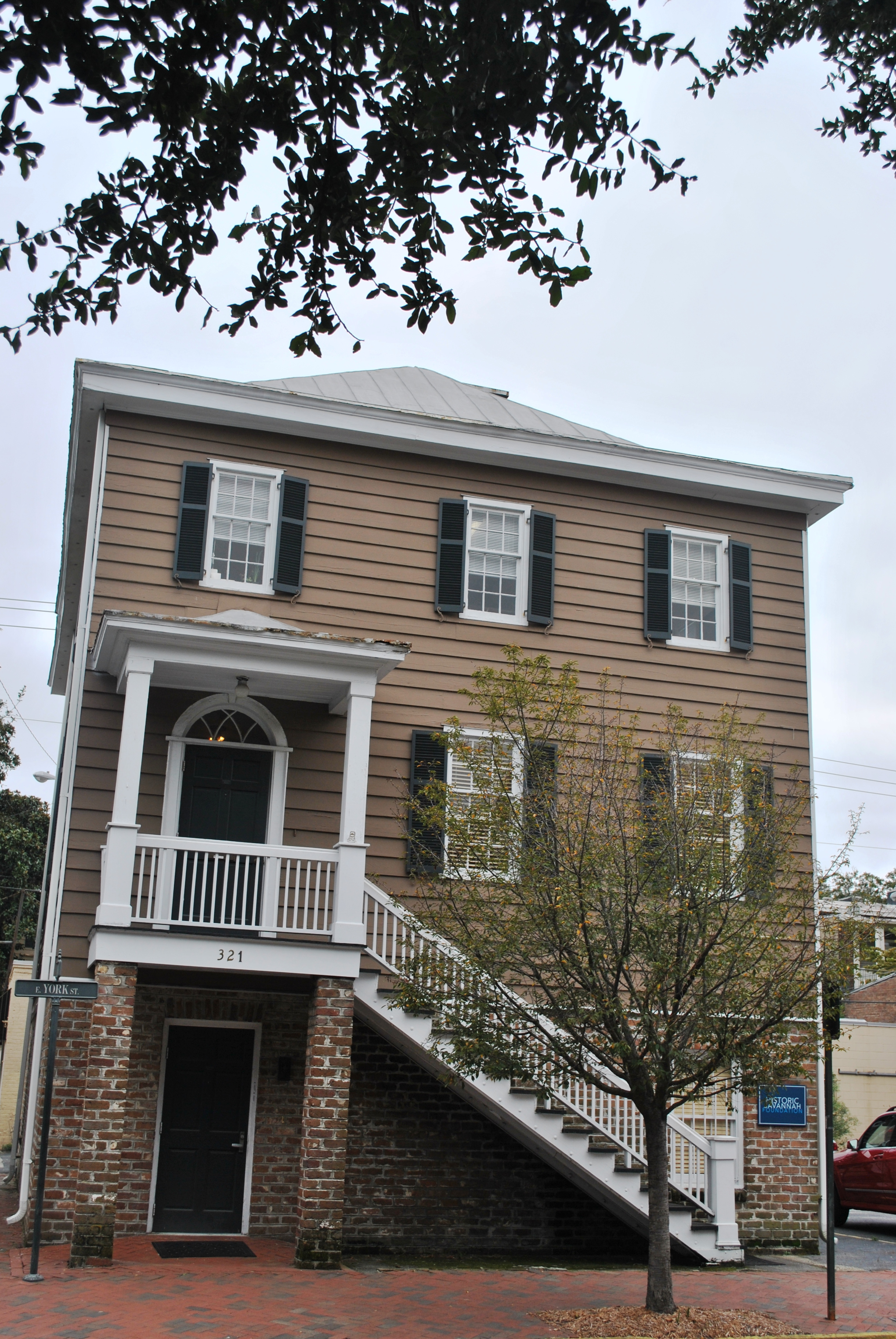
- The HSF office, 321 East York Street (built 1818)
- Abbreviation: HSF
- Founded: 1955 (71 years ago)
- Founders: • Anna Colquitt Hunter • Katharine Judkins Clark • Elinor Adler Dillard • Lucy Barrow McIntire • Dorothy Ripley Roebling • Nola McEvoy Roos • Jane Adair Wright
- Type: Non-profit
- Purpose: Preserving and protecting historic buildings
- Headquarters: 321 East York Street
- Location: Savannah, Georgia, U.S.
- Region served: Savannah, Georgia, U.S.
- Services: Preservation
- Key people: • Susan Adler (CEO and President) • Ryan Arvay (Director of Preservation and Historic Properties)
- Website: https://www.myhsf.org/

Historic Savannah Foundation (HSF) is a preservation organization founded in 1955 and based in Savannah, Georgia, United States.

In 1950, the four-story Wetter House on East Oglethorpe was demolished. This, combined with the razing of Savannah's popular City Market in Ellis Square, to be replaced by a parking garage, prompted a public outcry. The following year, a funeral home was set to purchase the Isaiah Davenport House in Columbia Square and tear it down for a parking lot. This sparked a movement to start a preservation process in the city.

"What began as an effort to save one house quickly turned into an organized movement that went on to save an entire city." – Historic Savannah Foundation

Local journalist, artist and activist Anna Colquitt Hunter (1892–1985) formed a group with six of her friends to block the demolition of the house and formed the Historic Savannah Foundation. The group managed to raise the $22,500 needed to purchase the property themselves.

The office of the foundation is in the southwest tything of the Columbia Square, at the Abraham Sheftall House, 321 East York Street. It had formerly been at the Isaiah Davenport House at 324 East State Street.

The Foundation bestows its highest honor, the Davenport Award, on select individuals.

In 1977, the foundation published Historic Savannah: A Survey of Significant Buildings in the Historic and Victorian Districts of Savannah, Georgia.

== Founders ==
- Anna Colquitt Hunter (1892–1985)
- Katharine "Kass" Judkins Clark (1897–1993)
- Elinor Adler Dillard (1903–1992)
- Lucy Barrow McIntire (1886–1967)
- Dorothy Ripley Roebling (1904–1977)
- Nola McEvoy Roos (1895–1980)
- Jane Adair Wright (1901–1991)

Lee Adler, son of Elinor Adler Dillard, served as the Foundation's president for six terms.

== Plaques ==
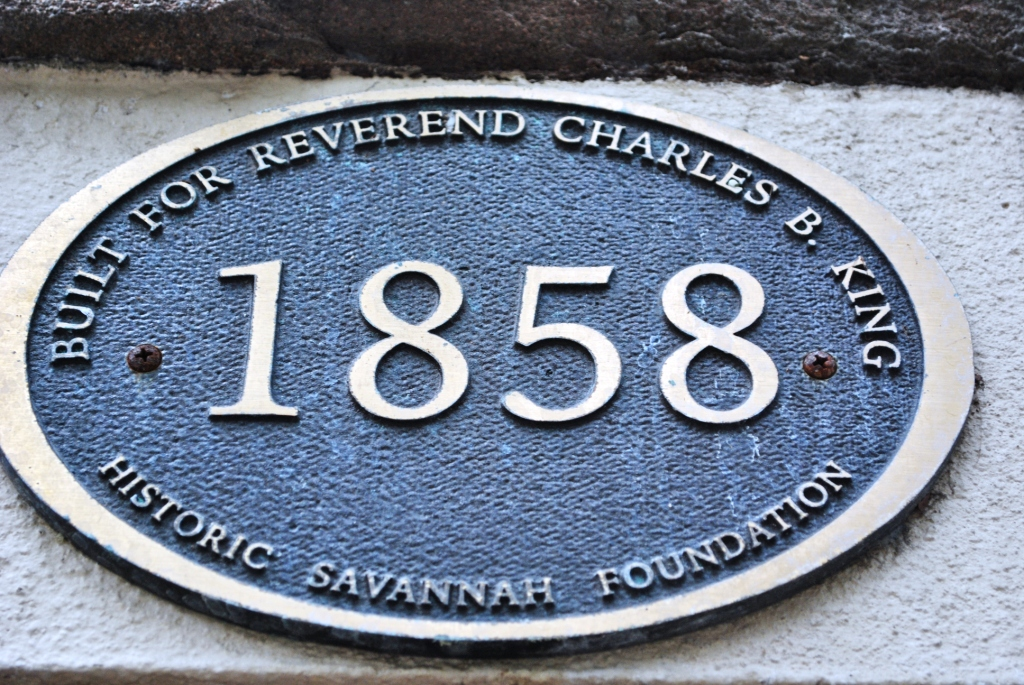
A Historic Savannah Foundation plaque on the Reverend Charles B. King House, 11 West Gordon Street
