= List of public art in Savannah, Georgia =

This is a list of public art in Savannah, Georgia, in the United States. This list applies only to works of public art on permanent display in an outdoor public space. For example, this does not include artwork in museums. Public art may include sculptures, statues, monuments, memorials, murals, and mosaics.

Image	Title / subject	Location and coordinates	Date	Artist / designer	Type	Material	Dimensions	Designation	Owner / administrator	Wikidata	Notes
More images	African-American Monument	River Street 32.081711°N 81.090884°W	2002	Dorothy Spradley	Monument	Bronze			City of Savannah	Q105592675	
More images	Casimir Pulaski Monument	Monterey Square 32.07135°N 81.09480°W		Robert E. Launitz	Monument				City of Savannah	Q14686606	
More images	Civil War Memorial	Forsyth Park 32°4′2.0388″N 81°5′46.7808″W		Robert Reid; David Richards	Memorial	Sandstone; Bronze			City of Savannah	Q96250643	
	The Georgia Volunteer	Forsyth Park 32°3′53.6″N 81°5′50″W		Theo Alice Ruggles Kitson	Monument				City of Savannah	Q7739671	Reproduction of The Hiker statue.
More images	James Oglethorpe Monument	Chippewa Square 32°4′32.7″N 81°5′35.4″W		Daniel Chester French; Henry Bacon	Monument				City of Savannah	Q101584159	
More images	Nathanael Greene Monument	Johnson Square 32°4′47.7″N 81°5′29.7″W		William Strickland	Monument	Granite			City of Savannah	Q100500284	
More images	Telfair Academy statues	Telfair Academy 32°4′43.5″N 81°5′42″W	1886	Viktor Oskar Tilgner	Statues	Limestone			Telfair Museums		Located in front of the Telfair Academy, these five statues were unveiled during the opening of the Telfair Museums. They consist of representations of Phidias, Michelangelo, Peter Paul Rubens, Rembrandt, and Raphael.
More images	William Jasper Monument	Madison Square 32°4′25″N 81°5′38″W		Alexander Doyle	Monument	Bronze; Granite			City of Savannah	Q99586914	
More images	William Washington Gordon Monument	Wright Square 32°4′41″N 81°5′32″W		Henry Van Brunt; Frank M. Howe	Monument	Granite; Marble			City of Savannah	Q100332269	
