= Civil War Memorial (Savannah, Georgia) =

War memorial in Savannah, Georgia

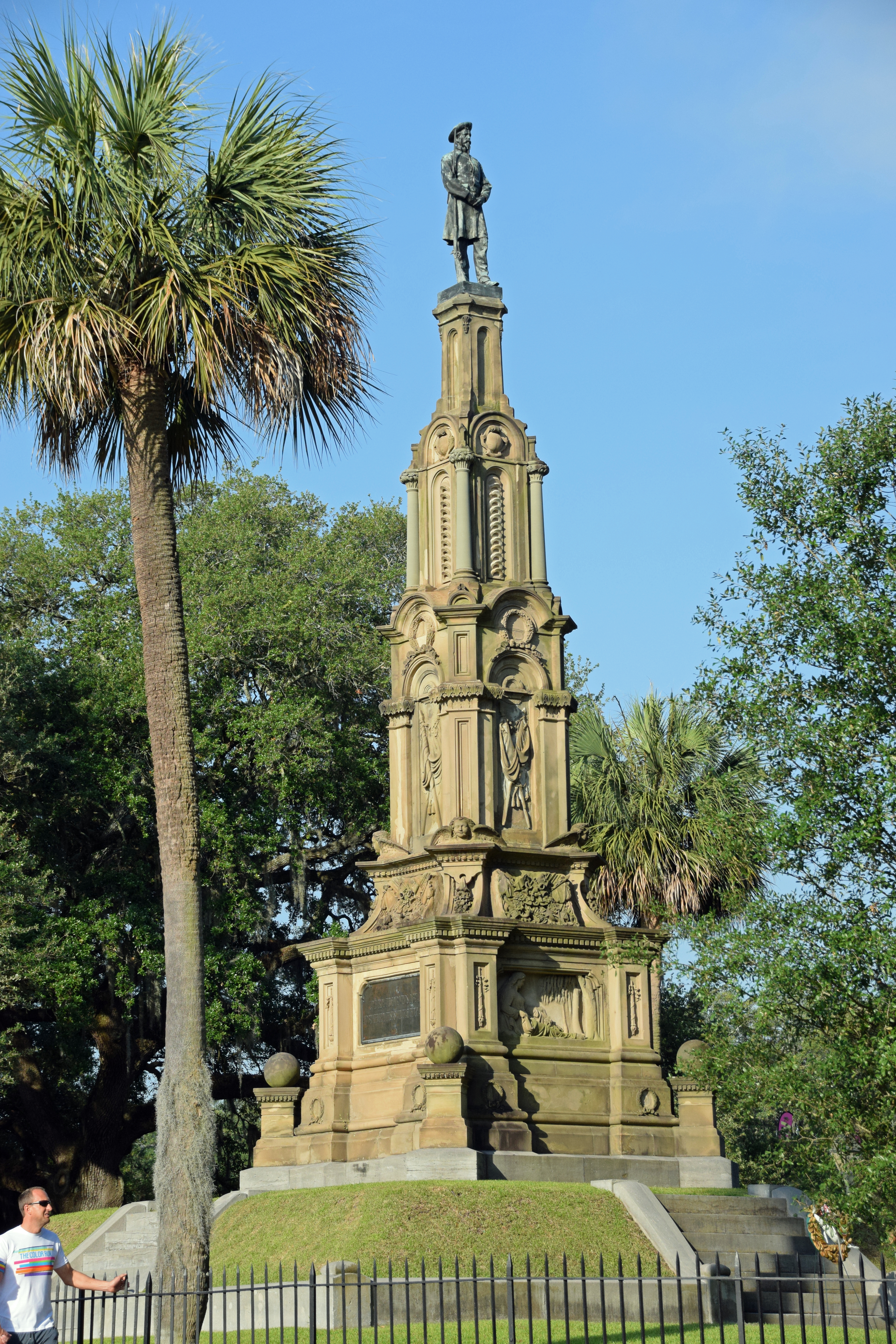
- Civil War Memorial in Forsyth Park (2015)
- Interactive map of Civil War Memorial
- Location: Forsyth Park, Savannah, Georgia
- Coordinates: 32°4′2.0388″N 81°5′46.7808″W
- Designer: Robert Reid; David Richards (Confederate Soldier statue)
- Material: Sandstone; Bronze (statue)
- Height: 48 feet (15 m) (Not counting base or top statue)
- Beginning date: June 16, 1874
- Dedicated date: May 24, 1875
- Dedicated to: Confederate soldiers who died in the Civil War

The Civil War Memorial in Savannah, Georgia, is a monument honoring soldiers who died during the American Civil War. Located in Forsyth Park, it consists of a 48-foot (15 m) tall shaft topped with a bronze statue of a Confederate soldier. Two bronze busts commemorating notable Confederate army officers flank the monument, which is protected by a railing, one of the only two that still stand around a monument, the other being the Casimir Pulaski Monument in Monterey Square. Originally known as the Confederate Monument, it was dedicated in 1875 to honor Confederate soldiers who died during the Civil War. Following the Unite the Right rally in August 2017, the city of Savannah renamed and rededicated the structure in 2018. The monument is one of the oldest and largest Confederate monuments in Georgia.

== History ==
=== Background and dedication ===
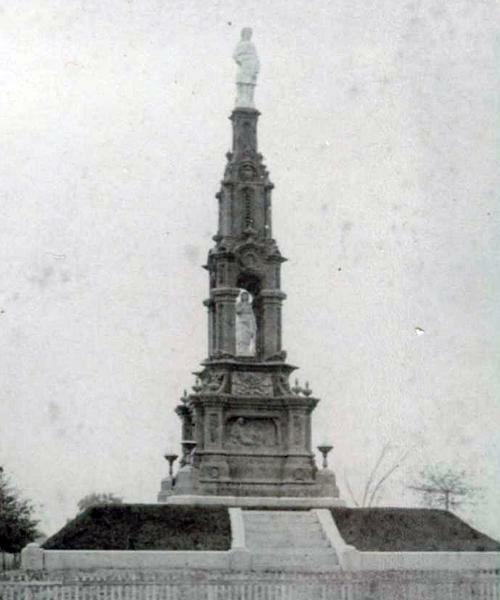
The monument as it originally appeared, with statues of Silence and Judgment

The idea for a public Confederate memorial in Savannah, Georgia began to gain traction in 1869, shortly after the relocation of Georgian soldiers killed at the Battle of Gettysburg to Laurel Grove Cemetery. Following this, the Ladies' Memorial Association in Savannah began to hold fundraising events, such as bake sales, raising almost $25,000 for the construction of a Confederate monument. While the association originally planned for the monument to be located in the Confederate section of Laurel Grove Cemetery, they ultimately decided to erect it in Forsyth Park. This decision proved controversial with many in the general public, who pointed out that Forsyth Park was, at the time, on the outskirts of the city, but the association contended that the statue would be overshadowed by trees and surrounding architecture if it was placed in any of the squares of Savannah. A public meeting at Independent Presbyterian Church in May 1874 settled the issue of location in favor of Forsyth Park.

The association, not wanting to employ an architect from any northern states, instead commissioned Welsh-born Canadian architect Robert Reid to design the monument. In April 1873, Reid visited Savannah at the invitation of the association and agreed with the location of Forsyth Park. On June 16, 1874, the cornerstone for the monument was placed as part of a large festival that also helped to raise more funds for its completion. In addition, a time capsule was placed under the cornerstone which included, among other items, a copy of the Georgia Ordinance of Secession, a piece of a flagpole from Fort Sumter, a bronze copy of the Seal of the Confederate States, and buttons from the uniforms of Confederate States Navy commodore Josiah Tattnall III and Confederate States Army general Joseph E. Johnston. Reid was given a great deal of artistic liberty in designing the monument, with the association only requiring that it feature a "life-sized figure worthy of the honor and respect due the common Confederate soldier". In August 1873, the association agreed to a design created by Reid. Not wanting to use materials from northern states, the monument's sponsors chose sandstone from Nova Scotia and had it worked in Canada. The monument was completed by the fall of 1874 and shipped from Canada to Savannah via a British schooner to avoid transporting the monument through northern states. The ship arrived in Savannah on December 25, 1874, but an issue with customs caused a delay in the transportation of the monument to the park. By March 1875, much of the monument had been assembled, and on May 24, 1875, the dedication ceremony was held. General Johnston was the grand marshal for the ceremony, assisted by General Robert H. Anderson, who served as assistant marshal. Julian Hartridge served as the ceremony's orator, and in his speech, he compared the efforts of the Confederate soldiers to the patriots during the American Revolution, saying "[t]hey had been sacrificed alike in the defense of constitutional liberty".

The monument consisted of a 48 foot (15 m) shaft on top of a 6 foot (1.8 m) earthen base. On top of this pedestal was a life-sized statue of a woman in a robe named Silence, and at the base of the monument was another statue of a woman called Judgment. Both statues had been shipped via New York City. Despite the fanfare that had accompanied the monument's dedication, public opinion soon soured towards the monument. Many felt the statue was too ornate to represent the common soldier. Writing about the monument several decades after its unveiling, Savannah mayor and historian Thomas Gamble called the monument "a distinct disappointment" that was "too symbolic" and "lacking in charm".

=== Confederate Soldier statue ===
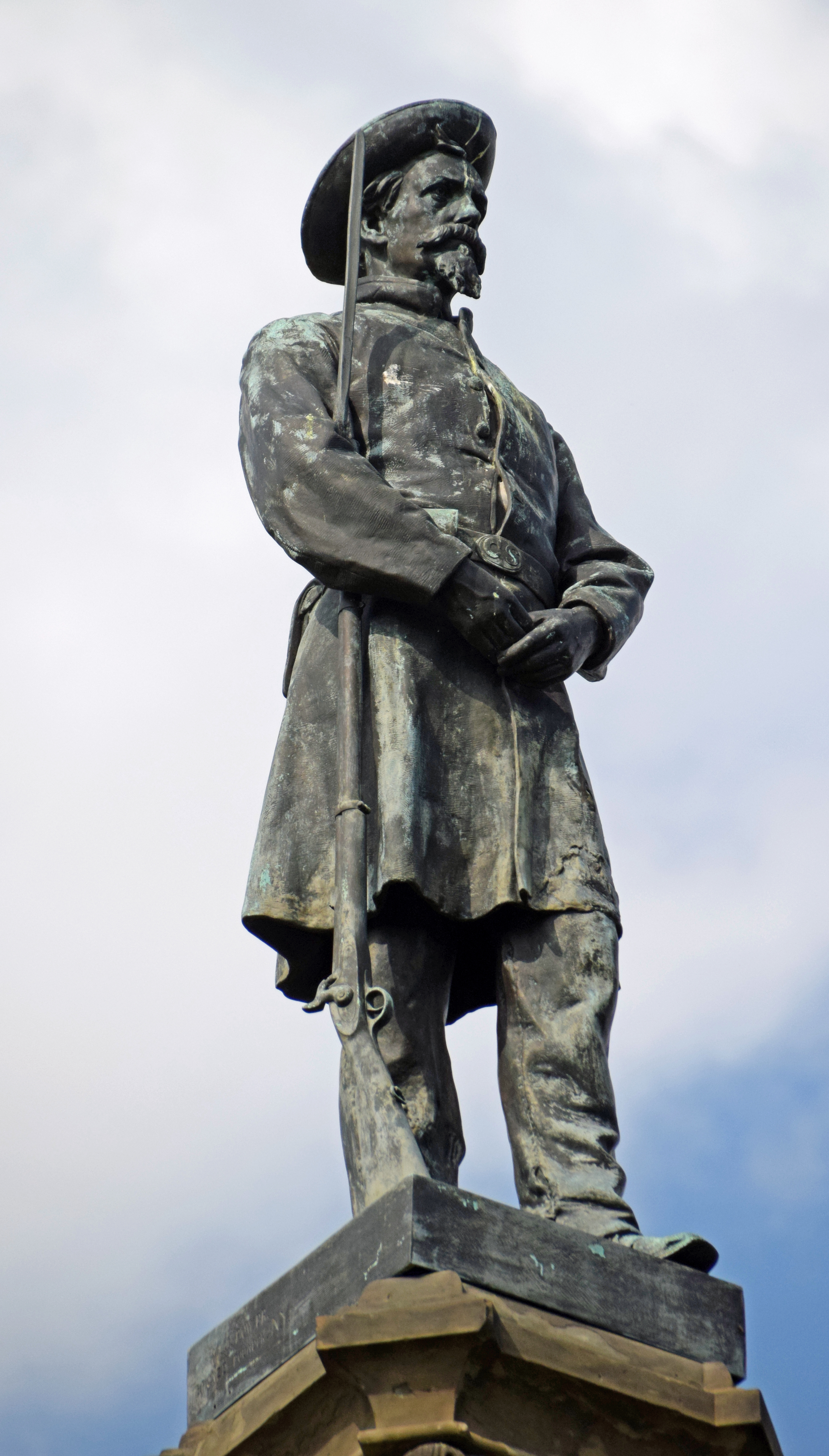
Confederate Soldier statue

In early 1878, prominent Savannah citizen George Wymberley Jones De Renne proposed replacing Silence, at his own expense, with a bronze statue of a Confederate soldier. The Ladies' Memorial Association approved this idea in March and again in April, and following this, De Renne hired New York-based architect David Richards to craft the statue. For the statue, simply called Confederate Soldier, De Renne and Richards wanted to depict a battle-worn soldier, which was rare, as few Confederate monuments at this time depicted them. Former Confederate Captain Hamilton Branch assisted Richards with the statue, sending him multiple articles of clothing he had worn in battle, as well as a rifle used during the war. According to Branch, the attire presented a soldier, "as he looked when he marched and fought, and not when he danced and fluted at home". The statue depicted the soldier at parade rest, which, according to De Renne, "indicates submission to the inevitable, without excluding the idea of manly struggle to avoid it". Richards used photos of Savannah veteran A. S. Bacon as a model. On May 22, 1879, Confederate Soldier was hoisted atop the shaft, with Silence and Judgment removed from the monument. Silence was relocated to the Confederate section of Laurel Grove Cemetery, while Judgment was sent to Thomasville, Georgia to be used as part of that town's Civil War memorial.

=== Additional memorials ===
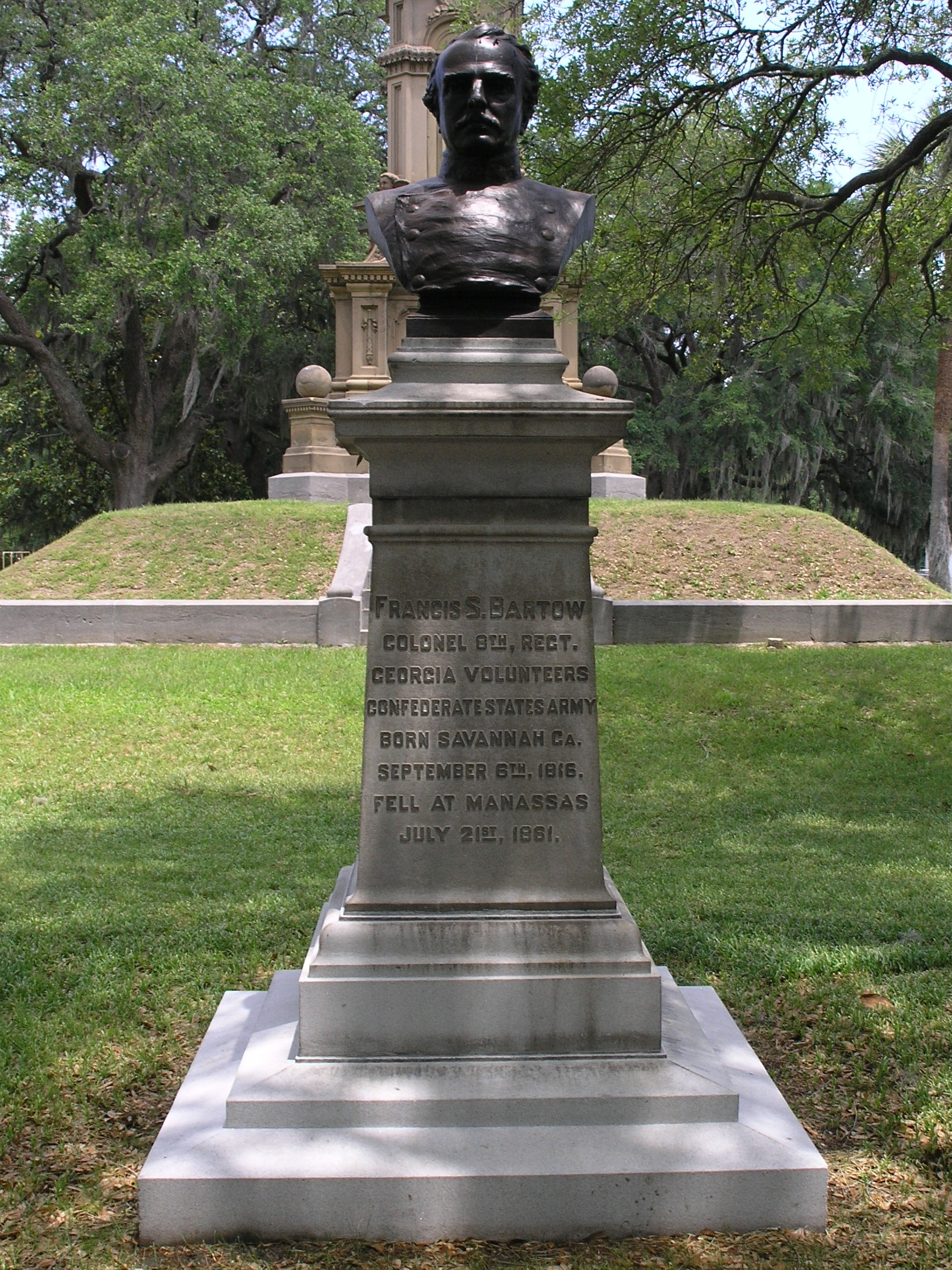
Bust of Francis S. Bartow, with the Confederate monument in the background

In 1910, two bronze busts honoring Confederate generals were moved next to the monument. The busts, of Lafayette McLaws and Francis S. Bartow were moved from Chippewa Square in Savannah to make way for the James Oglethorpe Monument.

=== Renaming and other proposed alterations ===
Following the Unite the Right rally in Charlottesville, Virginia, the City of Savannah announced the creation of the Confederate Memorial Task Force on October 30, 2017. The task force's operations consisted of historic research, observational fieldwork, and a public survey to decide what, if anything, to change about the monument. The culmination of these efforts were eight recommendations published in a report on December 22, 2017. On February 14, these recommendations were adopted by the city council. This included the relocation of the two busts to Laurel Grove Cemetery and renaming the monument from "Confederate Monument" to "Civil War Memorial". A bronze plaque was also to be added that would read, “This memorial was originally erected in 1875 to the Confederate dead, redesigned in 1879, and rededicated in 2018 to all the dead of the American Civil War.”

On April 26, 2019, Governor Brian Kemp signed into effect Georgia SB77, which explicitly stated, "A monument shall not be relocated to a museum, cemetery, or mausoleum unless it was originally placed at such location." This effectively delayed the implementation of most of the task force's recommendations. On June 18, 2020, the Savannah–Chatham County Historic Site and Monument Commission held a special meeting on the subject of the Civil War Memorial and passed a motion to send a letter in support of the task force recommendations and necessary budget allocations to the city council.

=== Vandalism ===
On June 10, 2020, during the nationwide George Floyd protests, the bust of McLaws was vandalized, with a white hood placed over the bust and a raised fist spray painted on the pedestal. Following the incident, a descendant of McLaws offered to buy and remove the statue from the park.

Almost a month later, on July 9, Silence in Laurel Grove Cemetery was vandalized, with the words “Silence–No More” spray painted on the statue. In late September, the main monument, as well as the busts and nearby sidewalk, were graffitied in response to the shooting of Breonna Taylor.

== See also ==
- 1875 in art
- Removal of Confederate monuments and memorials

== Bibliography ==
- Carlisle, Rodney; Carlisle, Loretta (2019). Savannah in History: A Guide to More Than 75 Sites in Historical Context. Rowman & Littlefield. ISBN 978-1-68334-028-7 – via Google Books.
- Confederate Memorial Task Force (December 22, 2017). "Confederate Memorial Task Force Final Report". Savannah.gov. Archived from the original on November 13, 2020.
- Congedo, Mariah (September 26, 2020). "Confederate monument in Forsyth Park vandalized". WTOC-TV. Archived from the original on October 7, 2020.
- Curl, Eric (February 14, 2018). "Savannah approves changes to Confederate Memorial". Savannah Morning News. GateHouse Media. Archived from the original on June 25, 2020.
- Daiss, Timothy (2002). Rebels, Saints, and Sinners: Savannah's Rich History and Colorful Personalities. Pelican Publishing. ISBN 978-1-4556-1089-1 – via Google Books.
- Guss, John Walker (2002). Fortresses of Savannah, Georgia. Arcadia Publishing. ISBN 978-0-7385-1468-0 – via Google Books.
- Jordan, Michael L. (2017). Hidden History of Civil War Savannah. Arcadia Publishing. ISBN 978-1-62585-180-2 – via Google Books.
- Komanecky, DeAnn (June 18, 2020). "Family of Confederate leader offers to purchase vandalized Savannah memorial". Bluffton Today. Gannett. Archived from the original on September 23, 2020.
- McDonough, Joan (February 15, 2018). "Savannah's Confederate monument is no more — kind of. And more changes are coming". The Island Packet. McClatchy. Archived from the original on June 24, 2018.
- Merrigan, JoAnn (June 11, 2020). "Confederate monument vandalized in Forsyth Park". WSAV-TV. Nexstar Media Group. Archived from the original on September 19, 2020.
- Olinger, Michael (November 4, 2017). "Savannah is seeking the public's advice on what to do with its Confederate Memorial". The Island Packet. McClatchy.
- Robertson, Nick (September 26, 2020). "Confederate monuments in Savannah's Forsyth Park defaced with appeals for justice in Breonna Taylor case". Savannah Morning News. Gannett. Archived from the original on October 1, 2020.
- Savannah City Council (February 14, 2018). "Action Minutes". Savannah.gov.
- Toone, Stephanie (June 11, 2020). "Georgia Confederate monument vandalized with white hood, black fist". The Atlanta Journal-Constitution. Cox Enterprises.
- Triplett, Whip Morrison (2006). Savannah. Postcard History Series. Arcadia Publishing. ISBN 978-0-7385-4209-6 – via Google Books.
- Wallace, Jake (July 9, 2020). "Confederate monument in Laurel Grove Cemetery vandalized". WTOC-TV. Gray Television.
- Waring, Martha Gallaudet (March 1929). Waring, Martha Gallaudet (ed.). "Charles Seton Henry Hardee's Recollections of old Savannah". The Georgia Historical Quarterly. 13 (1): 13–49. JSTOR 40576070.
- Wheeler, Frank (Summer 1998). ""Our Confederate Dead": The Story Behind Savannah's Confederate Monument". Georgia Historical Quarterly. 82 (2). Georgia Historical Society: 382–397. ISSN 0016-8297. JSTOR 40584060.
