= Monterey Square (Savannah, Georgia) =

Public square in Savannah, Georgia

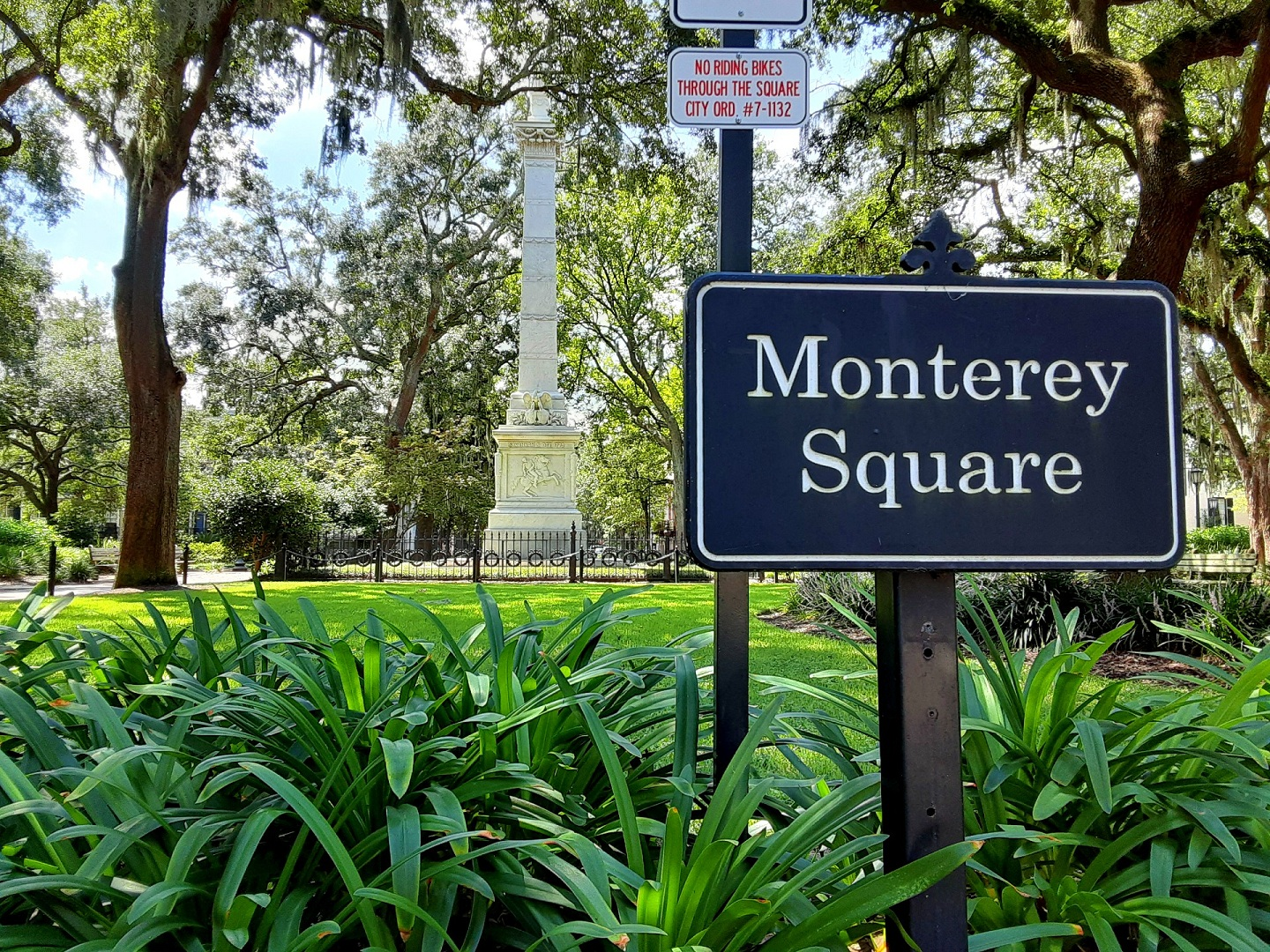
- Looking south across the square
- Interactive map of Monterey Square
- Namesake: Battle of Monterrey
- Maintained by: City of Savannah
- Location: Savannah, Georgia, U.S.
- Coordinates: 32.0714°N 81.0948°W
- North: Bull Street
- East: East Wayne Street
- South: Bull Street
- West: West Wayne Street

Construction
- Completion: 1847 (179 years ago)

Monterey Square is one of the 22 squares of Savannah, Georgia, United States. It is located in the southernmost row of the city's five rows of squares, on Bull Street and Wayne Street, and was laid out in 1847. It is south of Madison Square, west of Taylor Square, north of Forsyth Park and east of Chatham Square. The oldest building on the square is the Herman Kuhlman Duplex, at 22–24 West Taylor Street, which dates to 1851.

Monterey Square commemorates the Battle of Monterrey (1846), in which American forces, under General Zachary Taylor, captured the city of Monterrey during the Mexican–American War. (The correct spelling in reference to the square is "Monterey".)

In the center of the square is a monument honoring General Casimir Pulaski, erected in 1853. The body of an unknown Revolutionary soldier, speculated by some to be Pulaski himself, is said to be buried beneath the monument.

Monterey Square is the site of Mercer House, built by Hugh Mercer and later the home of antiques dealer and conservator Jim Williams. The house (which fills an entire block) and the square itself, were featured prominently in John Berendt's 1994 true crime novel Midnight in the Garden of Good and Evil. The square has been used as a setting for several motion pictures, including the 1997 film version of Berendt's novel and The Ordeal of Dr. Mudd, starring Dennis Weaver, in 1979. The Comer House, in the northeastern residential/tything block, is also featured in the movie.

The square is home to Congregation Mickve Israel, which boasts one of the few Gothic-style synagogues in America, dating from 1878.

All but one of the buildings surrounding the square are original to the square, the exception being the United Way Building at 428 Bull Street.

== Dedication ==
Namesake	Image	Note
Battle of Monterrey		The square is dedicated to the United States' victory at the Battle of Monterrey, a conflict of the Mexican–American War.

== Markers and structures ==
Object	Image	Note
Casimir Pulaski monument		In the center of the square is an 1853 monument honoring General Casimir Pulaski. The cornerstone of the monument was laid by Gilbert du Motier, Marquis de Lafayette — in Chippewa Square – in 1825. Due to financial limitations, an obelisk in Johnson Square served as a joint memorial to Nathanael Greene and Pulaski for several years. By 1852, funds had been collected to give Pulaski his own monument. The sculptor, Robert Eberhard Launitz, was allowed to choose the site for the project and he had the cornerstone moved to Monterey Square. Deterioration of the Pulaski monument was noted as early as 1912, and pieces began to fall in the 1990s. Restoration of the monument was completed in 2001. The body of an unknown Revolutionary soldier, speculated by some to be Pulaski himself, is said to be buried beneath Pulaski's monument.
Casimir Pulaski plaque		Erected by the Georgia Historical Commission in 1954.
Pulaski Monument plaque		Erected by the Georgia Historical Commission in 1954.
Comer House/Jefferson Davis plaque		Erected by the Georgia Historical Commission in 1956.
Congregation Mickve Israel plaque		Erected by the Georgia Historical Commission in 1967.
Detail of the Pulaski Monument iron enclosure fence		The southeastern corner of the monument.

== Scudder's Row ==
Scudder's Row is a historic row house comprising the five homes from 1 to 9 East Gordon Street in the southeastern residential block of the square. They were built between 1852 and 1853 by brothers John and Ephraim Scudder.

== Constituent buildings ==
Each building below is in one of the eight blocks around the square composed of four residential "tything" blocks and four civic ("trust") blocks, now known as the Oglethorpe Plan. They are listed with construction years where known.

Northwestern residential/tything block

- Herman Kuhlman Duplex, 22–24 West Taylor Street (1851)
- George Gray House, 20 West Taylor Street (1855) – altered in 1893
- Andrew Farie House, 18 West Taylor Street (1913)
- 12 West Taylor Street (1868)
- 10 West Taylor Street (1872) – became the Hurn Museum in 2004
- Nicholas Cruger House, 4 West Taylor Street (1852) – oldest building on the square

Northwestern civic/trust block

- Revd. Charles W. Rogers House, 423–425 Bull Street (1858) – later the home of Lee and Emma Adler
- John Lynch Building, 422 Whitaker Street (1880)

Southwestern civic/trust block

- Mercer House, 429 Bull Street (1868)

Southwestern residential/tything block

- Noble Hardee Mansion, 3 West Gordon Street (1860/1884)
- 7–9 West Gordon Street (1884)
- 11 West Gordon Street (1858)
- John Williams Duplex, 17–19 West Gordon Street (1879–1882)
- Joachim Saussy House, 23 West Gordon Street (1870)

Northeastern residential/tything block

- Comer House, 2 East Taylor Street (1880)
- William Hunter House, 10 East Taylor Street (1872)
- Thomas-Levy House (western half of the Thomas-Purse Duplex), 12 East Taylor Street (1869/1894)
- 14 East Taylor Street (eastern half of the Thomas-Purse Duplex; 1869)
- David Lopez Cohen Property (1), 16–20 East Taylor Street (1852)
- David Lopez Cohen Property (2), 24 East Taylor Street (1852)
- David Lopez Cohen Property (3), 28–32 East Taylor Street (1852)

Southeastern civic/trust block

- Congregation Mickve Israel, 20 East Gordon Street (1878)

Southeastern residential/tything block

- Scudder's Row, 1–9 East Gordon Street (1853)
- 11 East Gordon Street (1854)
- Charles McGill House, 15 East Gordon Street
- John Rowland House, 17–19 East Gordon Street (1881)
- Frederick Groschaud House, 23 East Gordon Street (1854) – remodeled in 1909

== Gallery ==
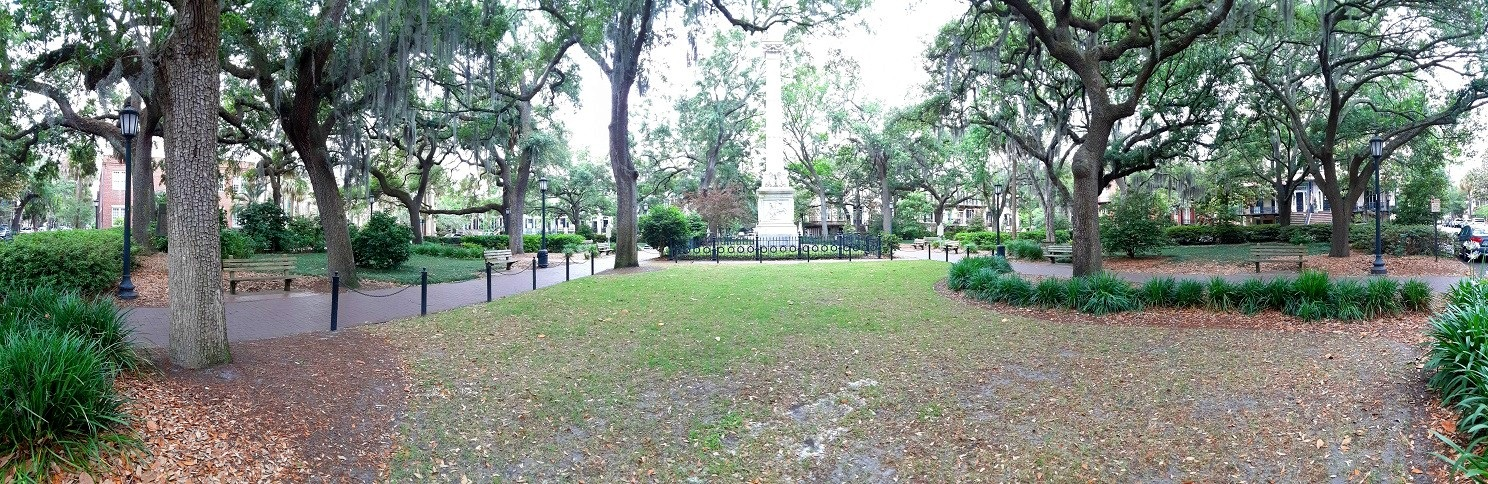
Panoramic view of Monterey Square, facing south, 2022

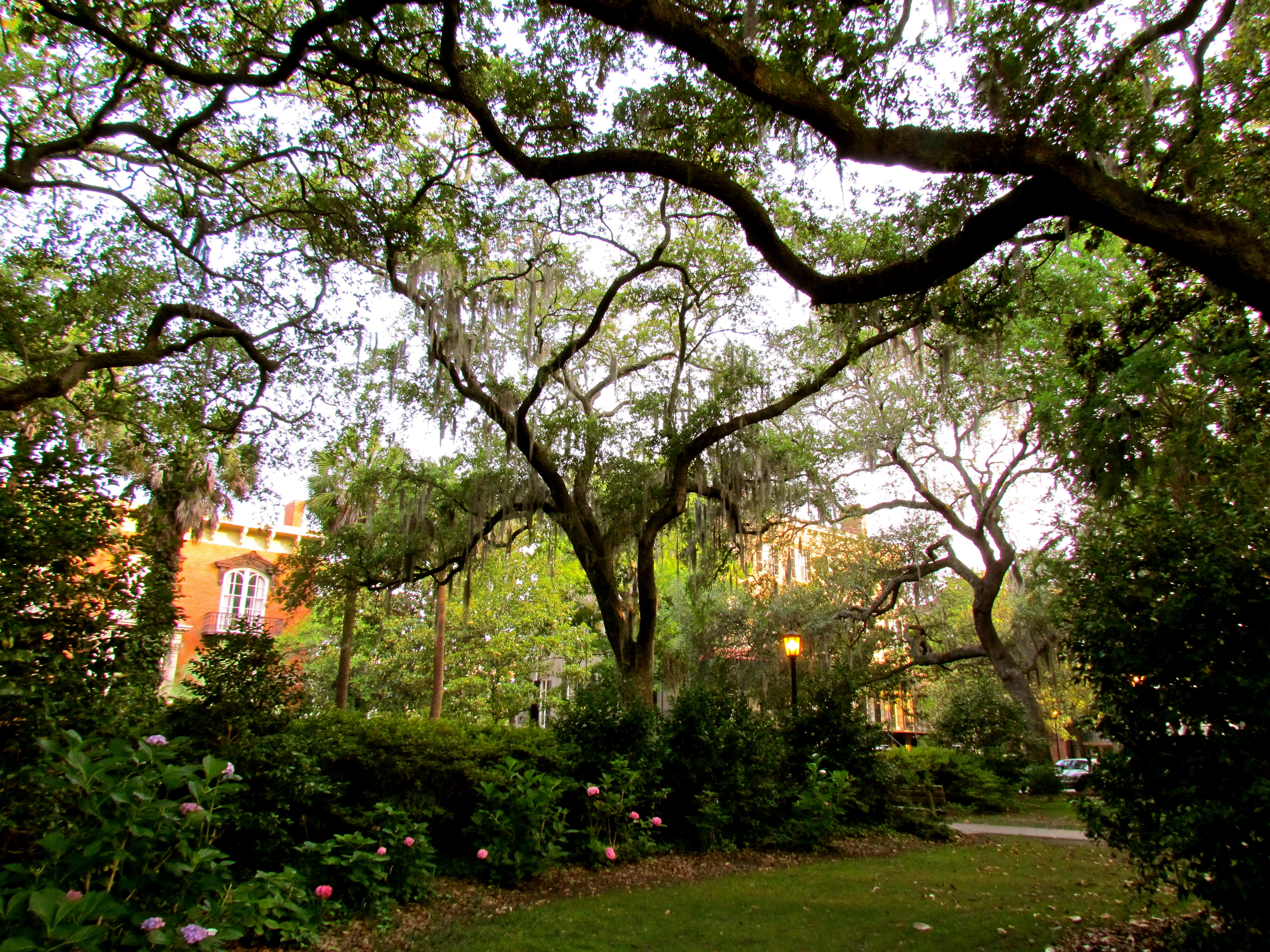
Spanish moss in the square

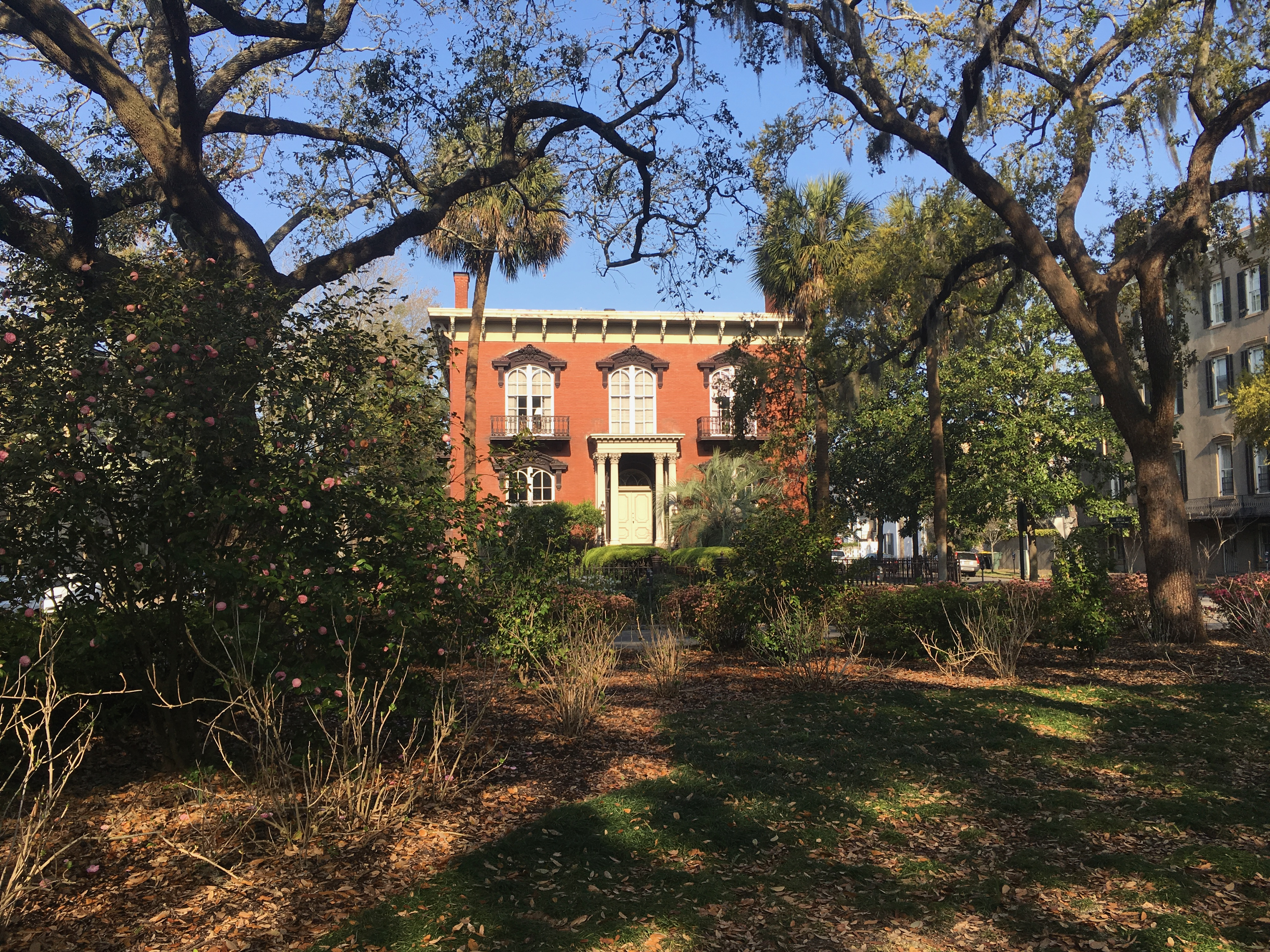
Mercer Williams House Museum, at 429 Bull Street, occupies the entire southwestern trust lot

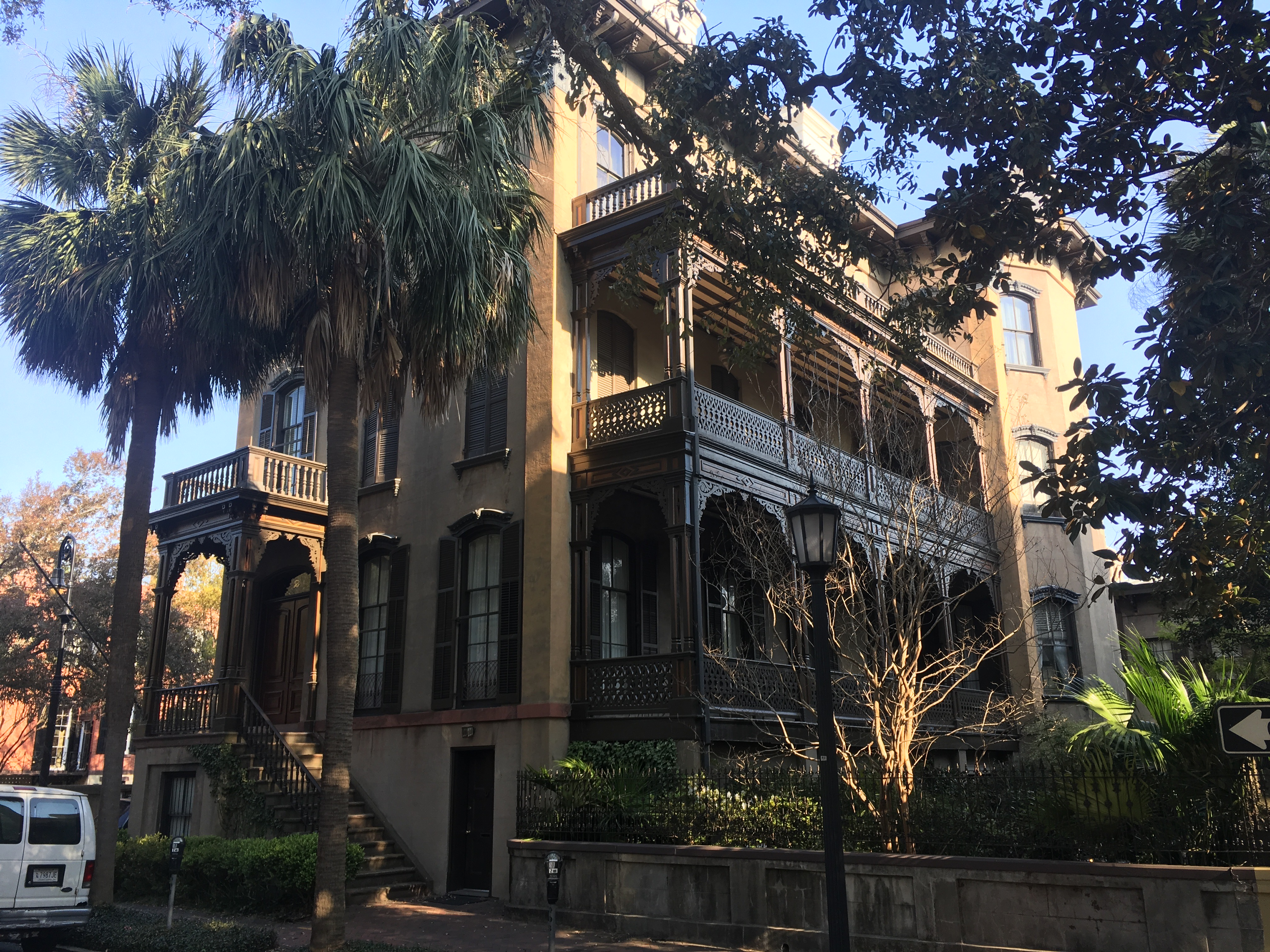
Comer House, 2 East Taylor Street

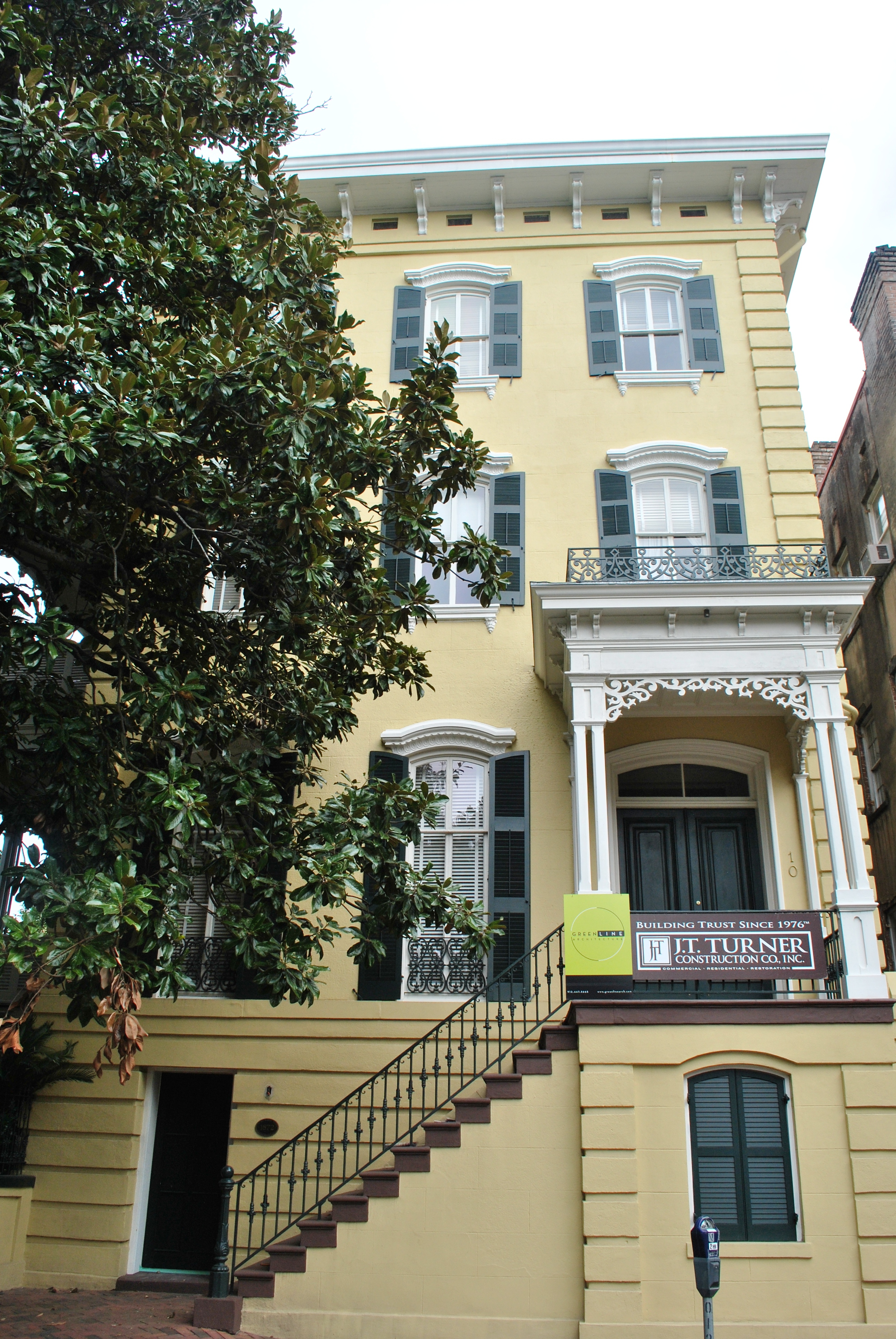
William Hunter House, 10 East Taylor Street

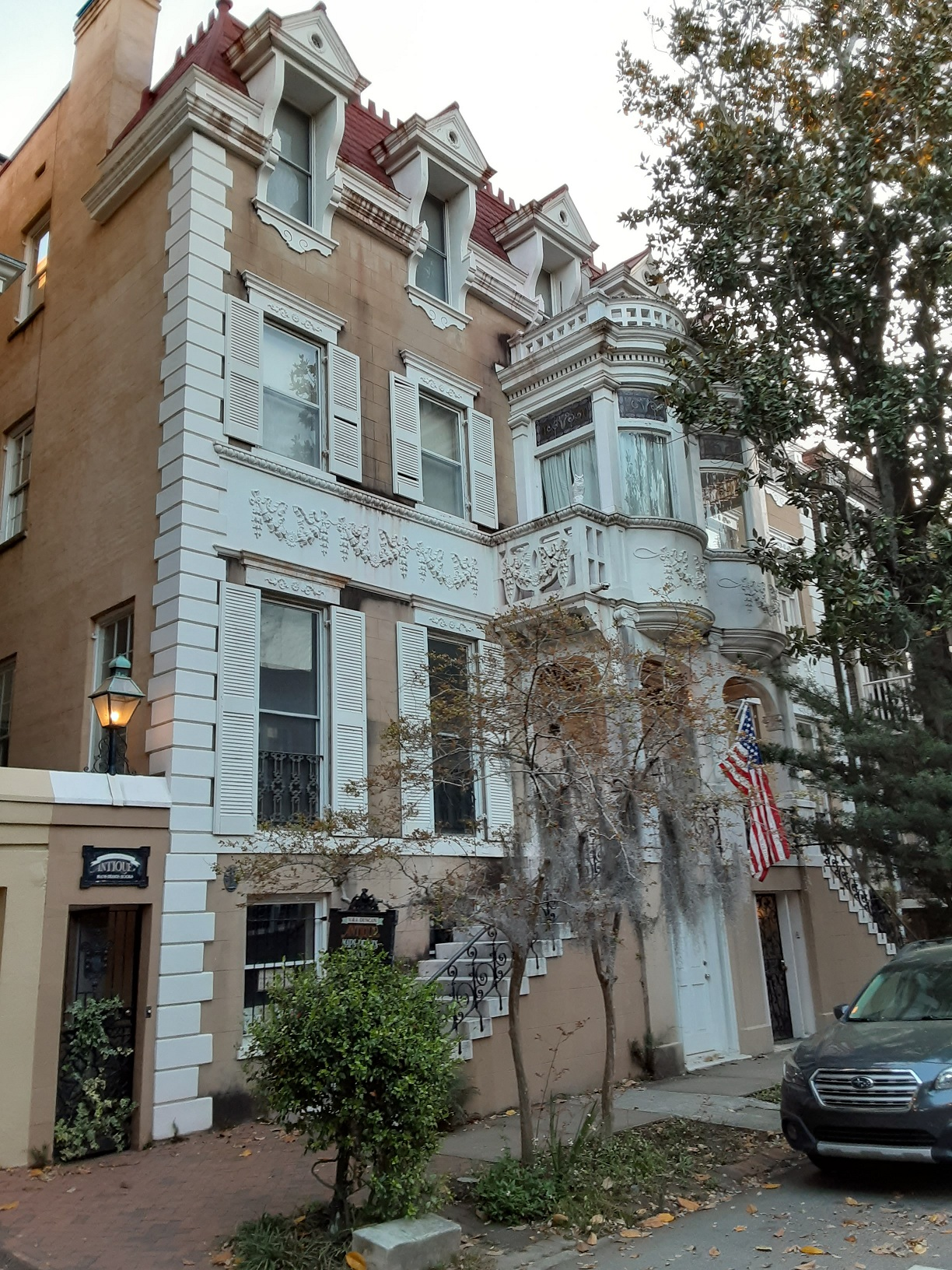
Thomas–Levy House, 12 East Taylor Street

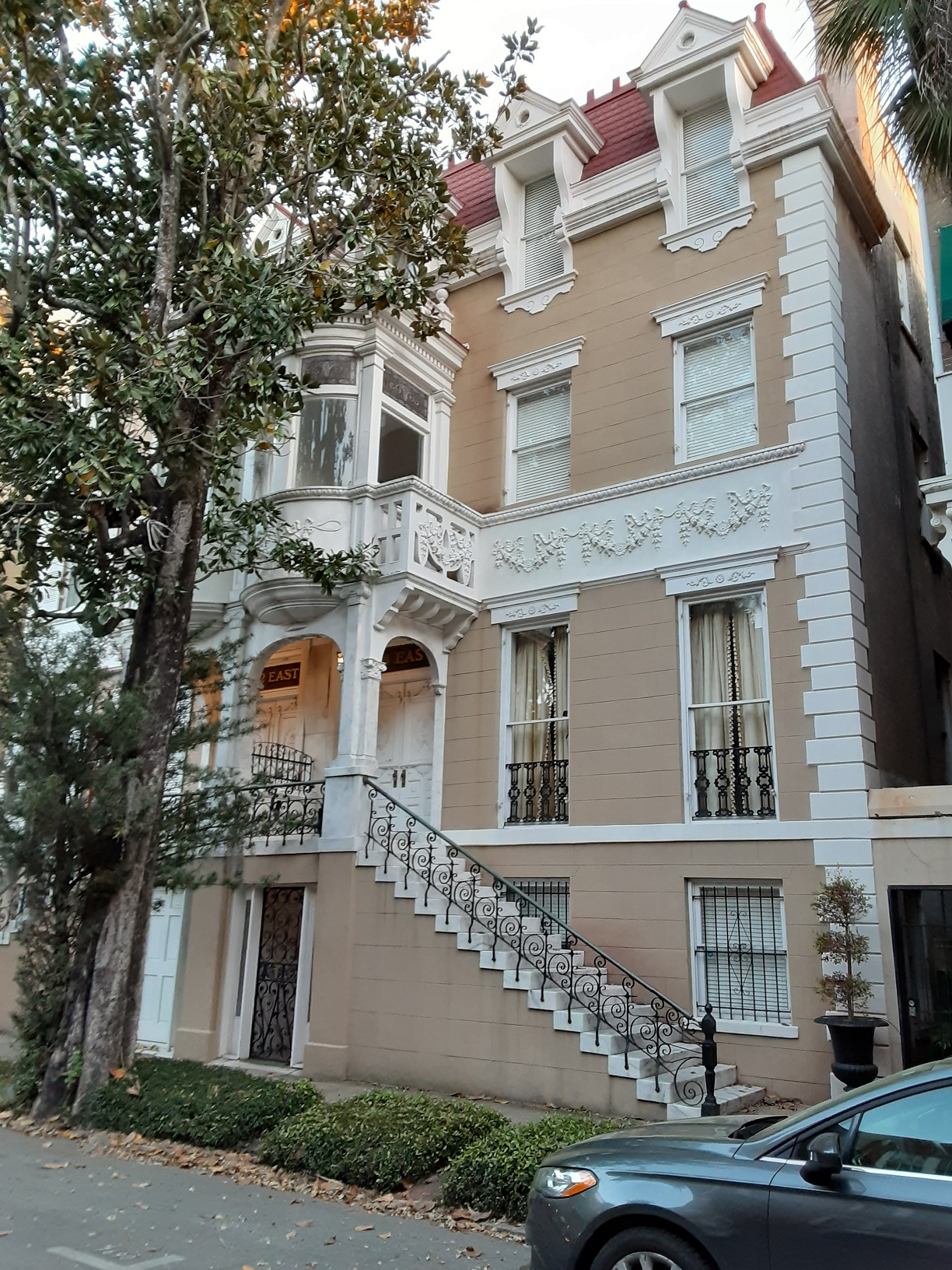
14 East Taylor Street

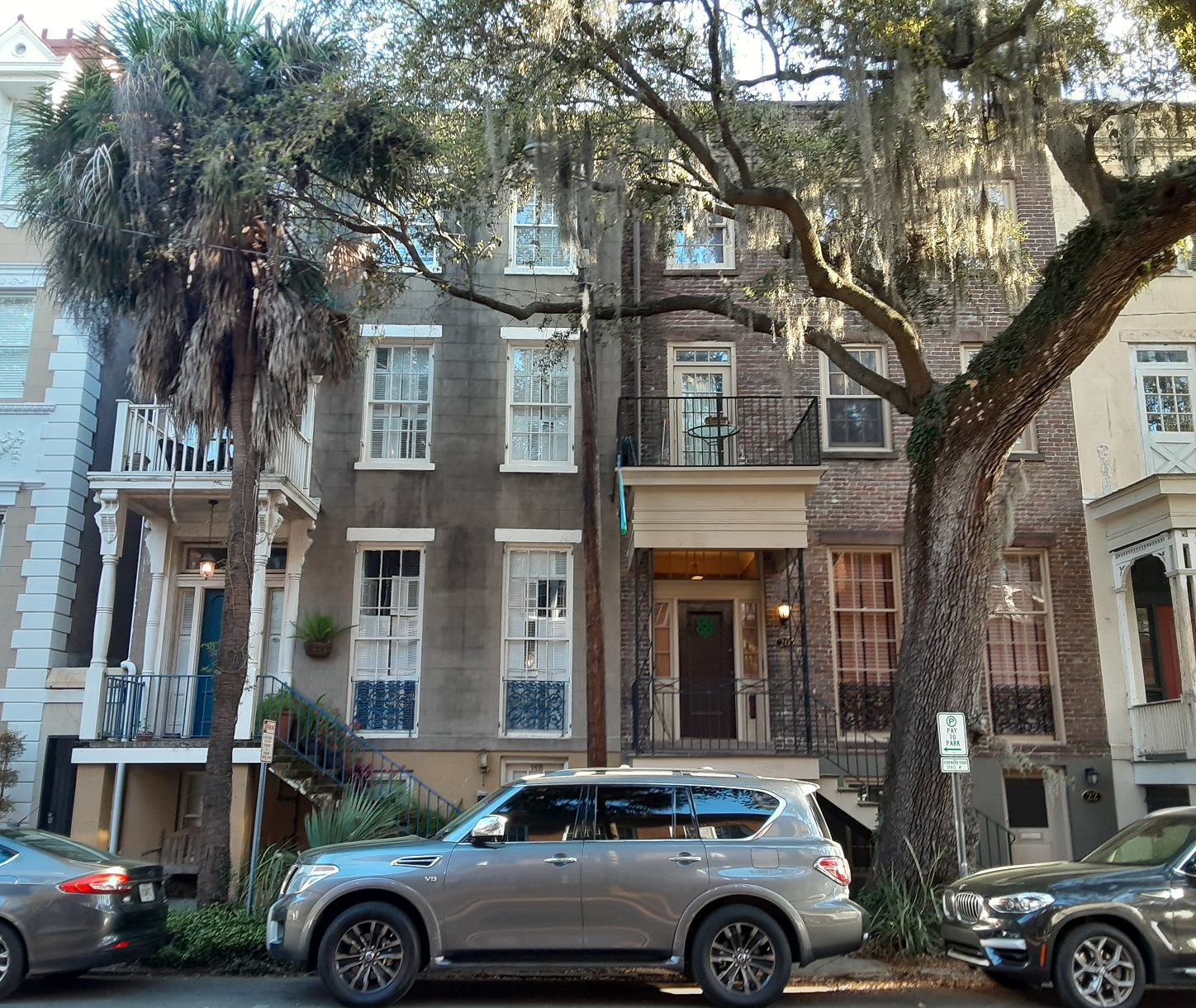
David Lopez Cohen Property (1), 16–18 East Taylor Street

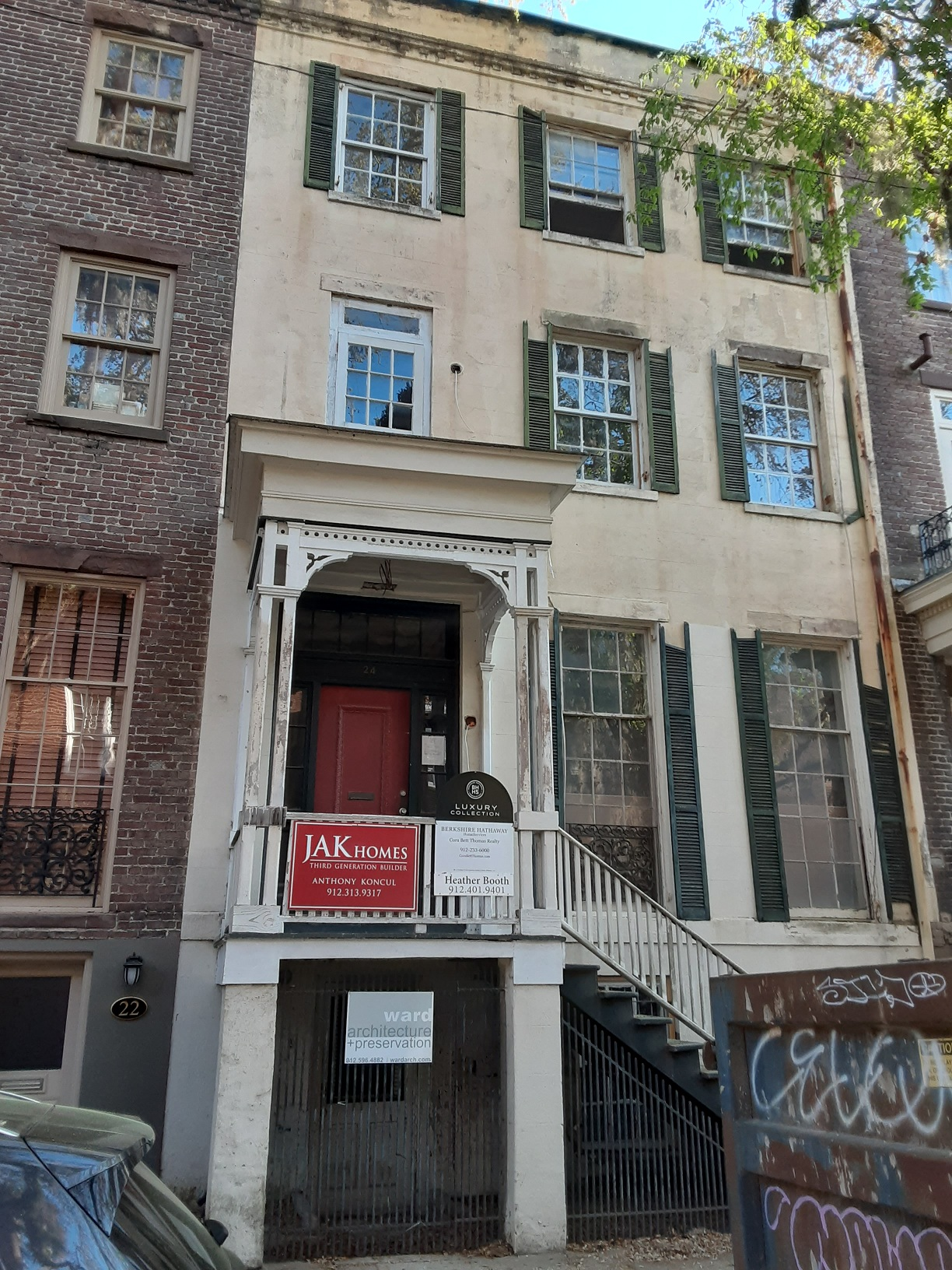
David Lopez Cohen Property (2), 24 East Taylor Street

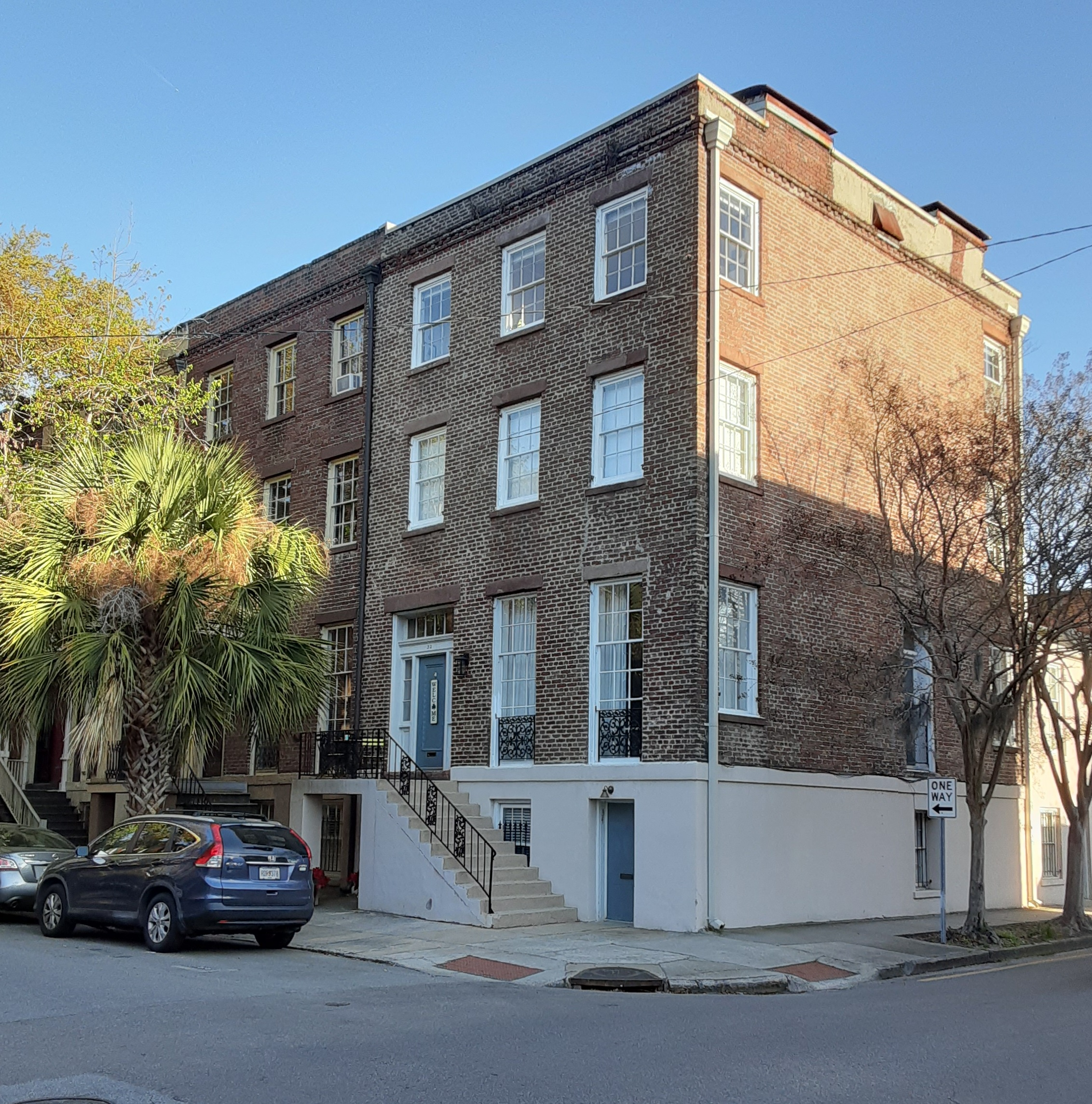
David Lopez Cohen Property (3), 28–32 East Taylor Street

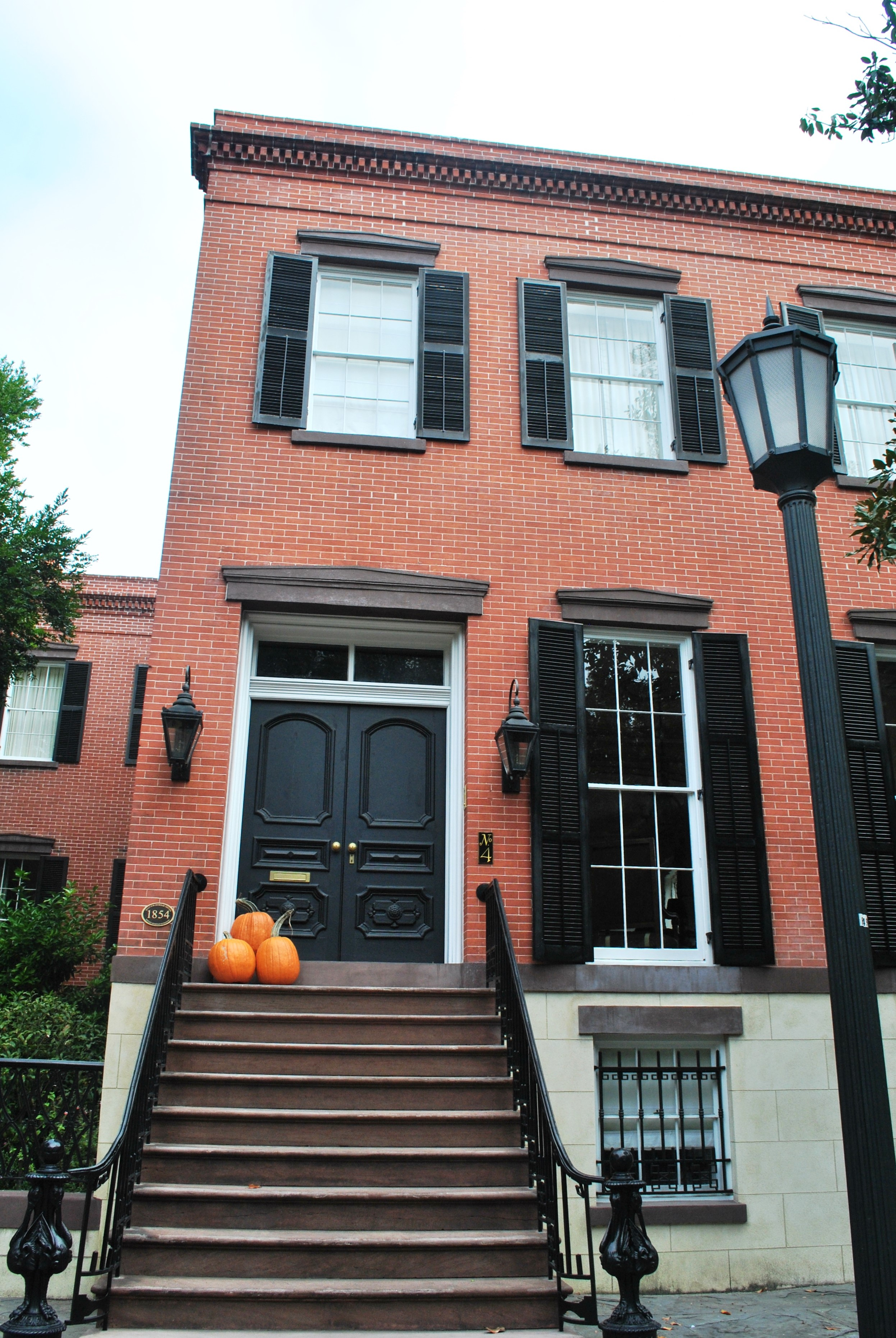
Nicholas Cruger House, 4 West Taylor Street

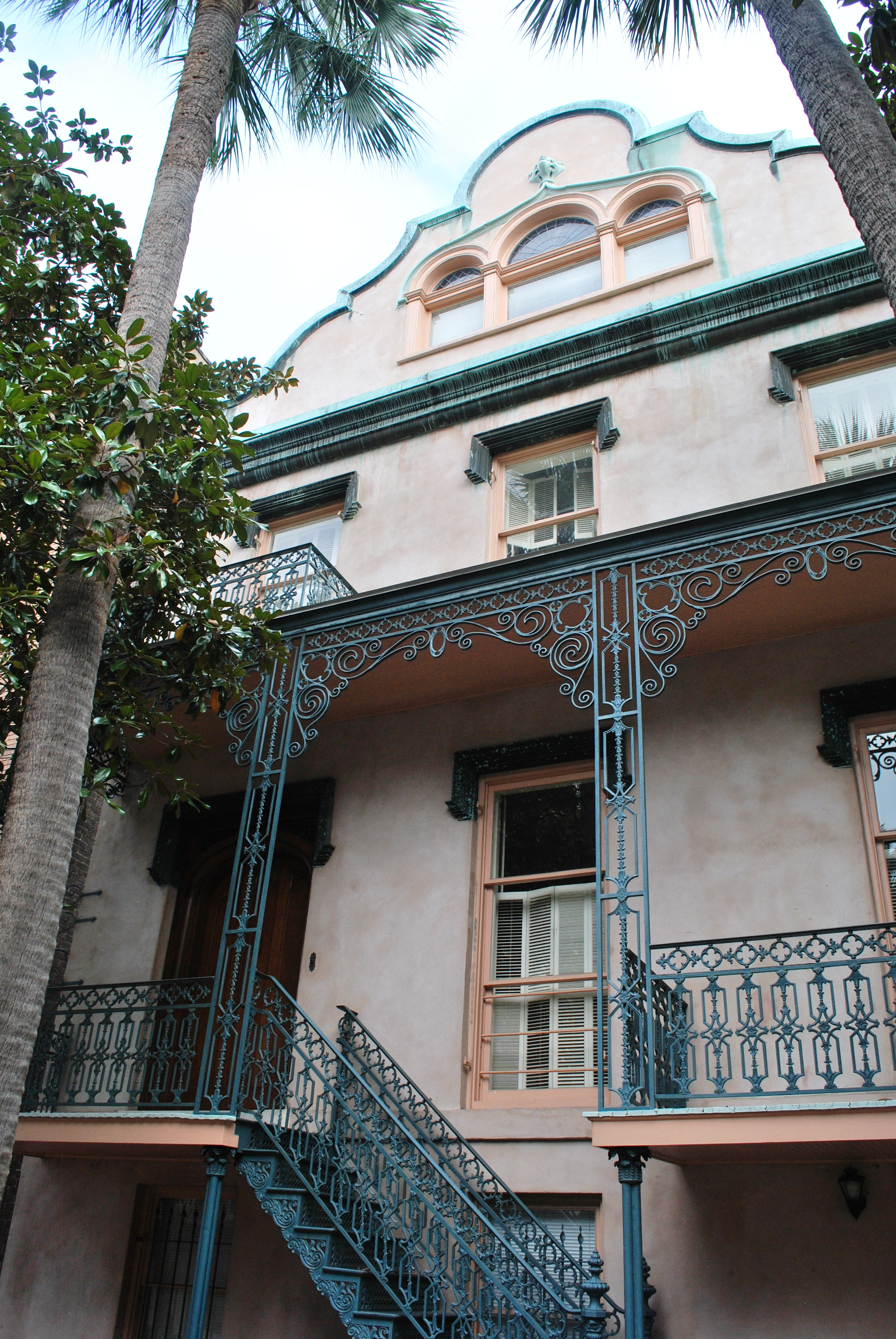
Hurn Museum, 10 West Taylor Street

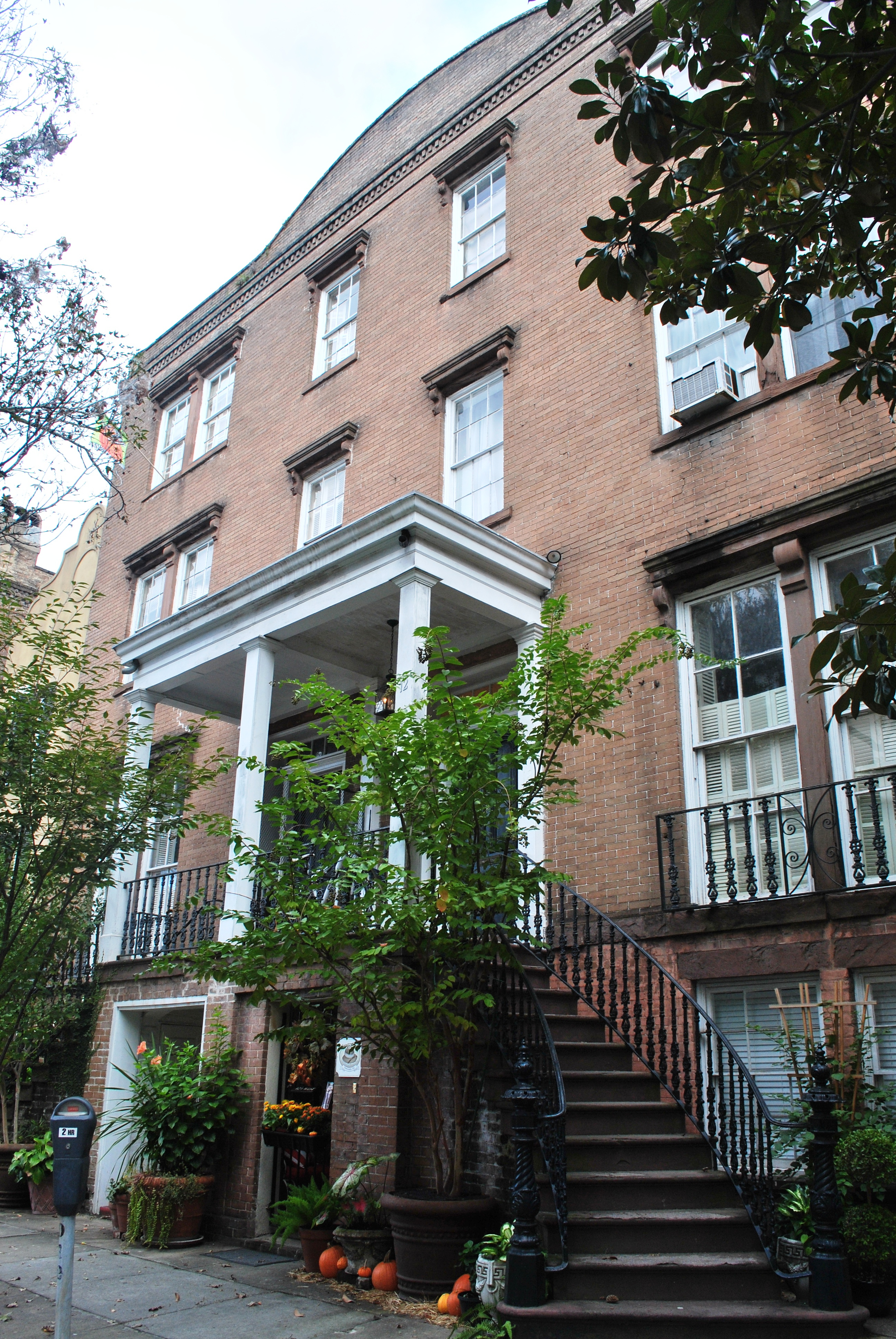
12 West Taylor Street

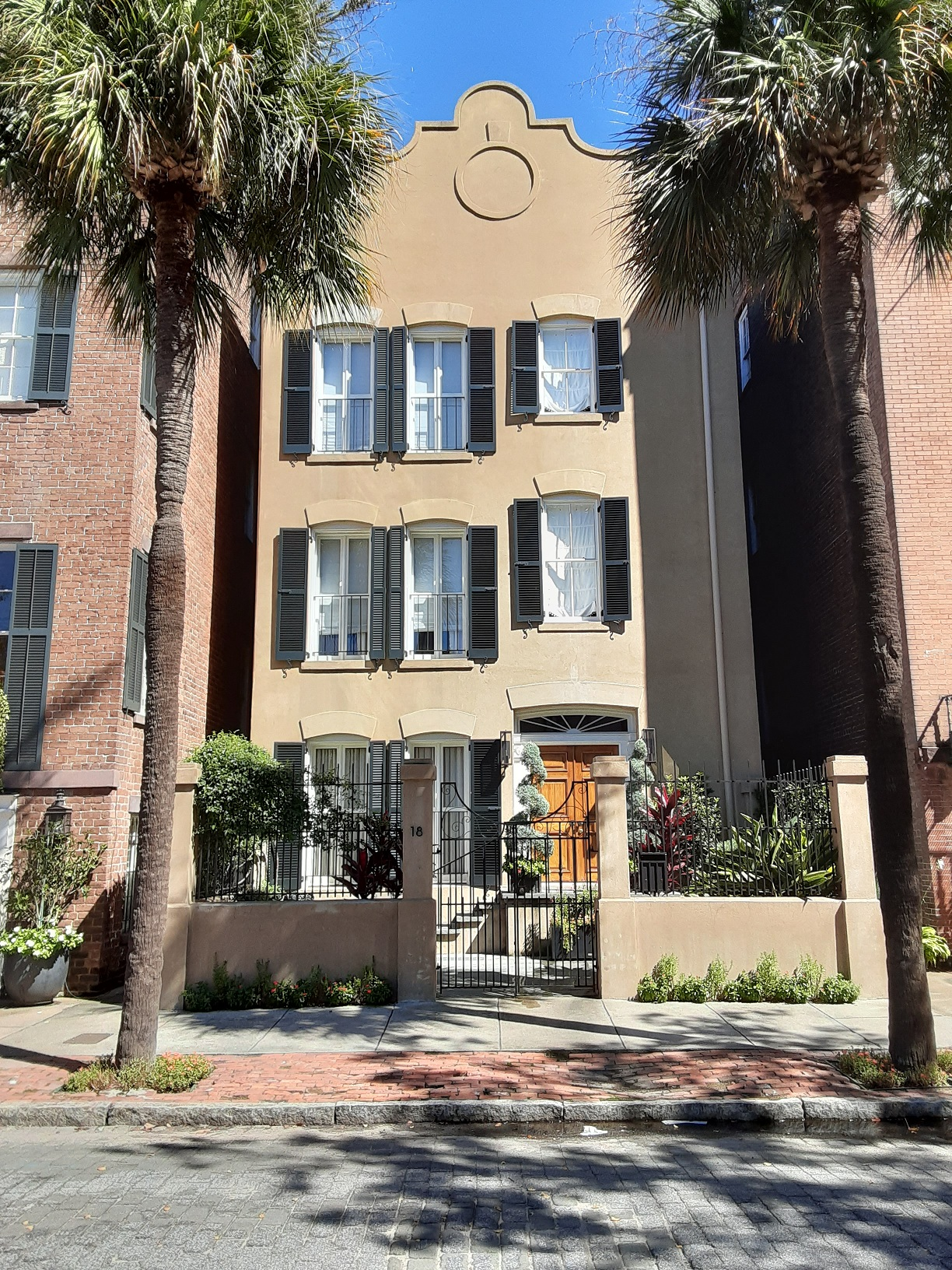
Andrew Farie House, 18 West Taylor Street

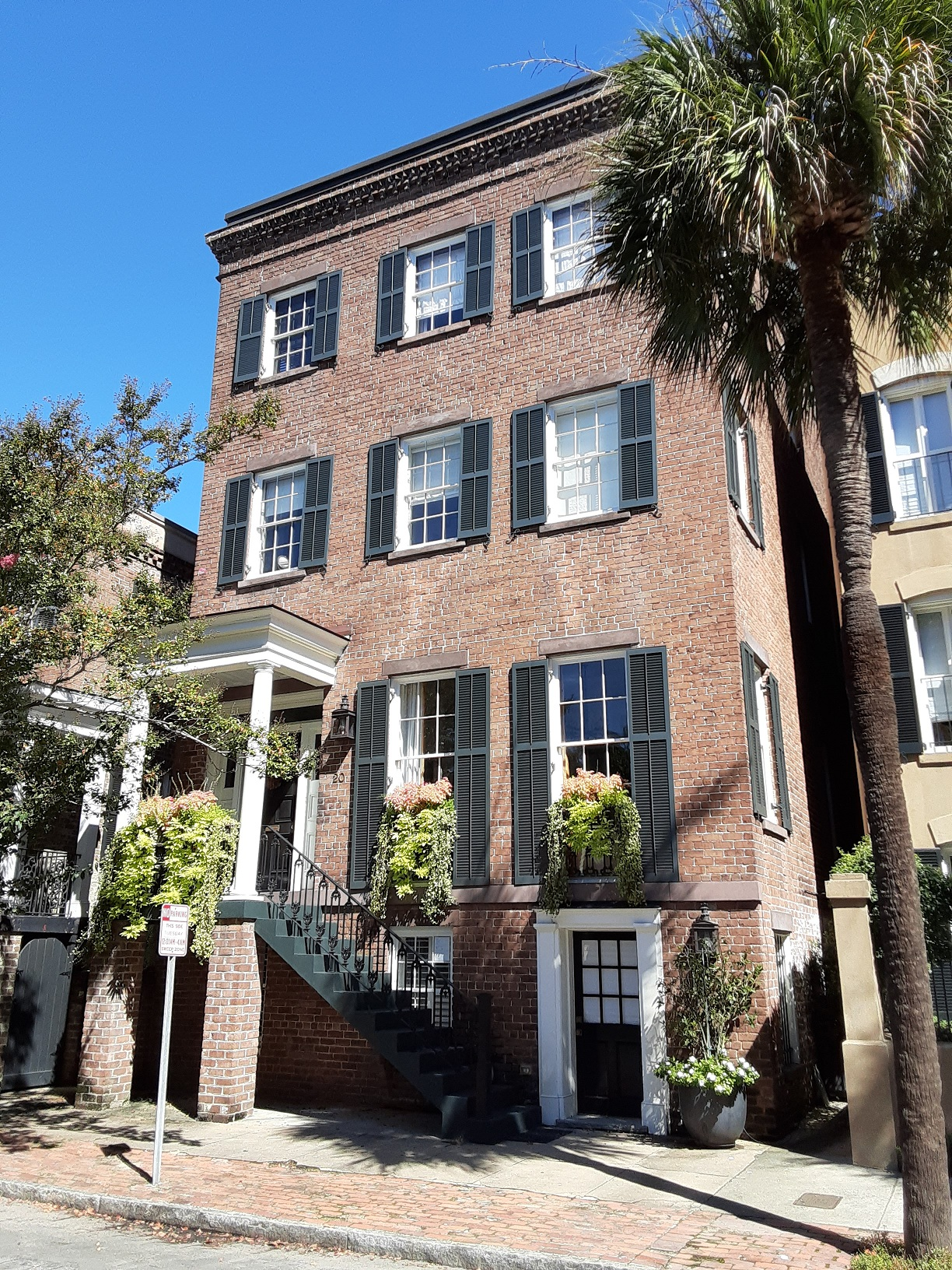
George Gray House, 20 West Taylor Street

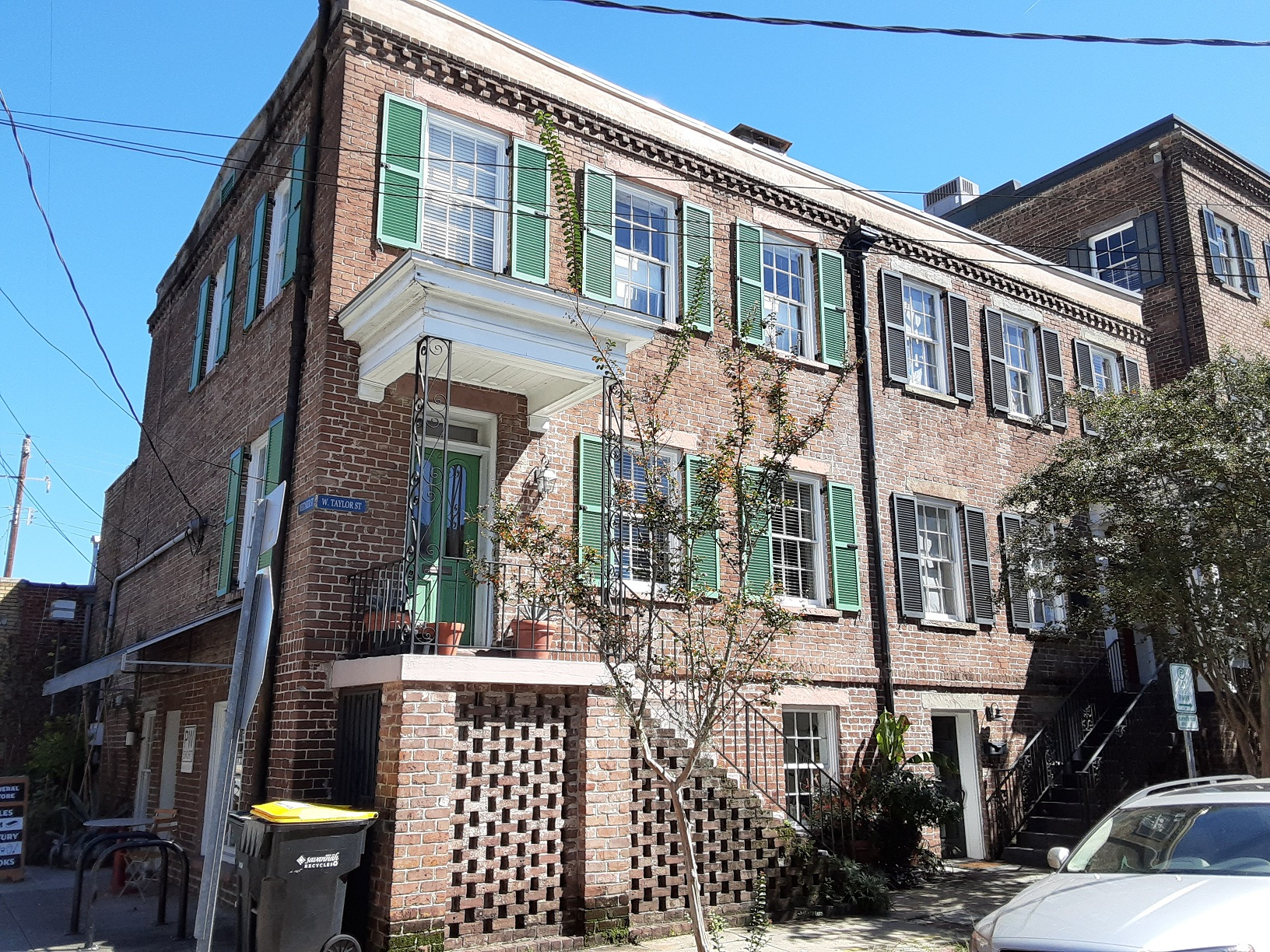
Herman Kuhlman Duplex, 22–24 West Taylor Street

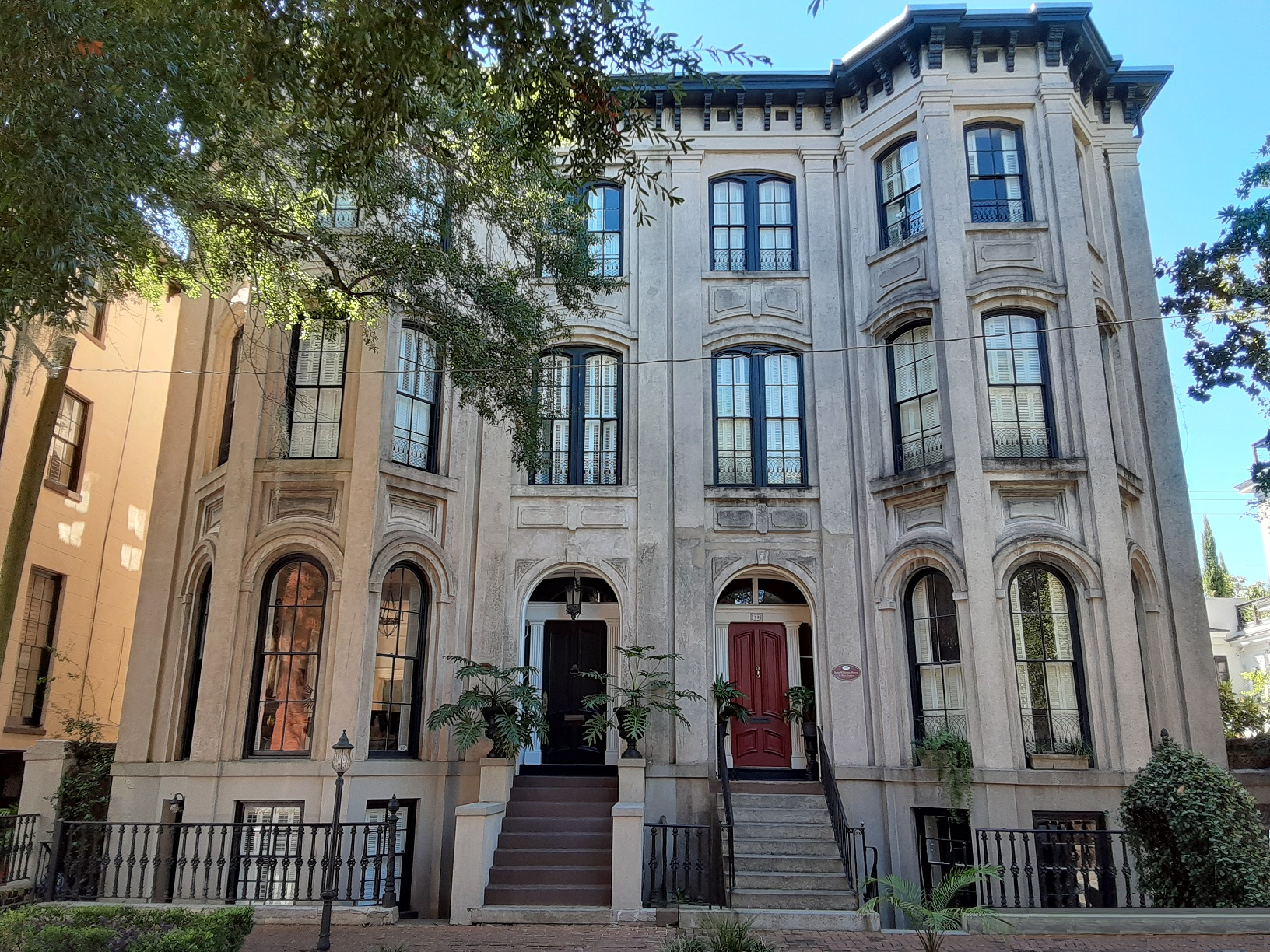
John Williams Duplex, 17–19 West Gordon Street

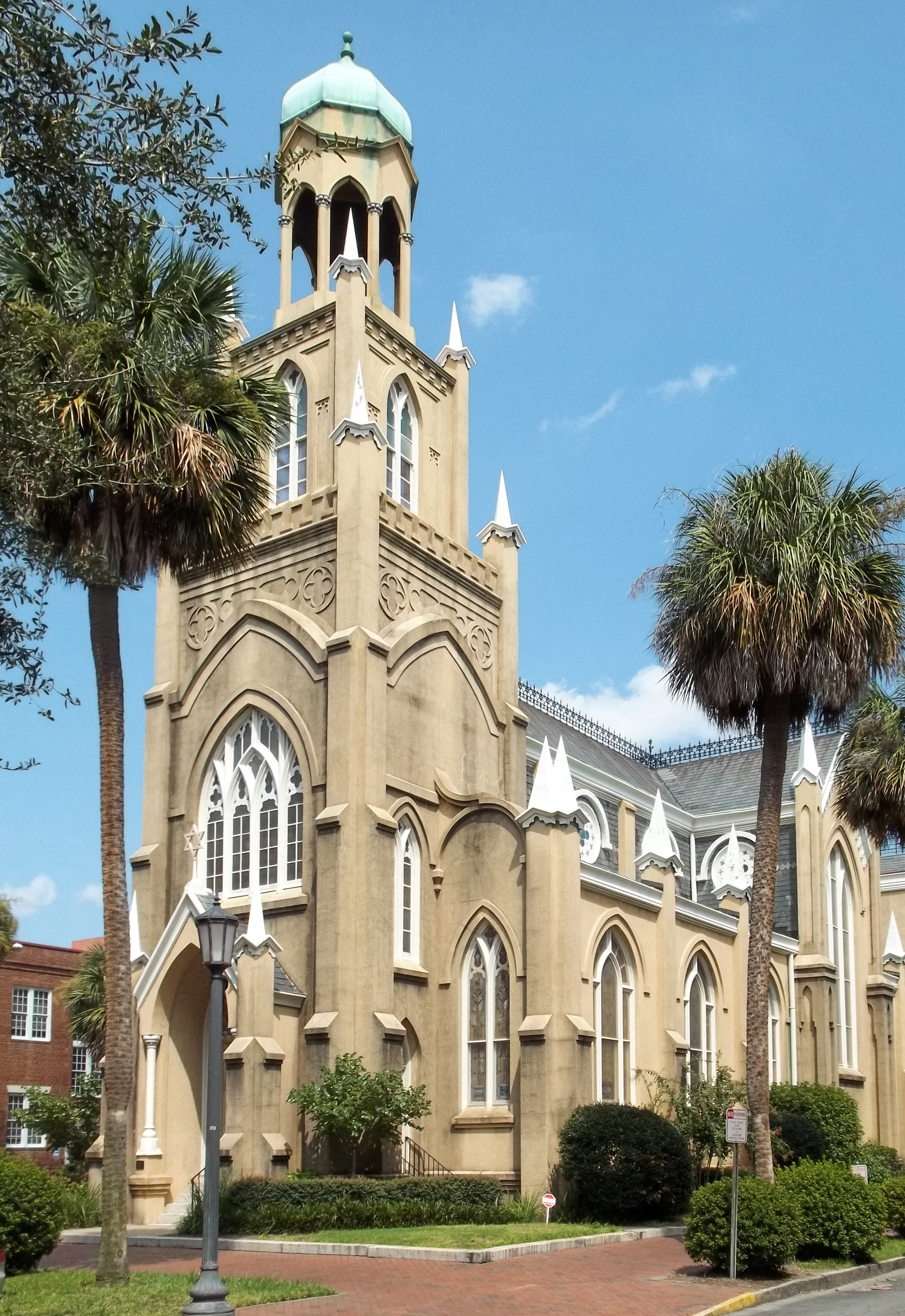
Congregation Mickve Israel, 20 East Gordon Street

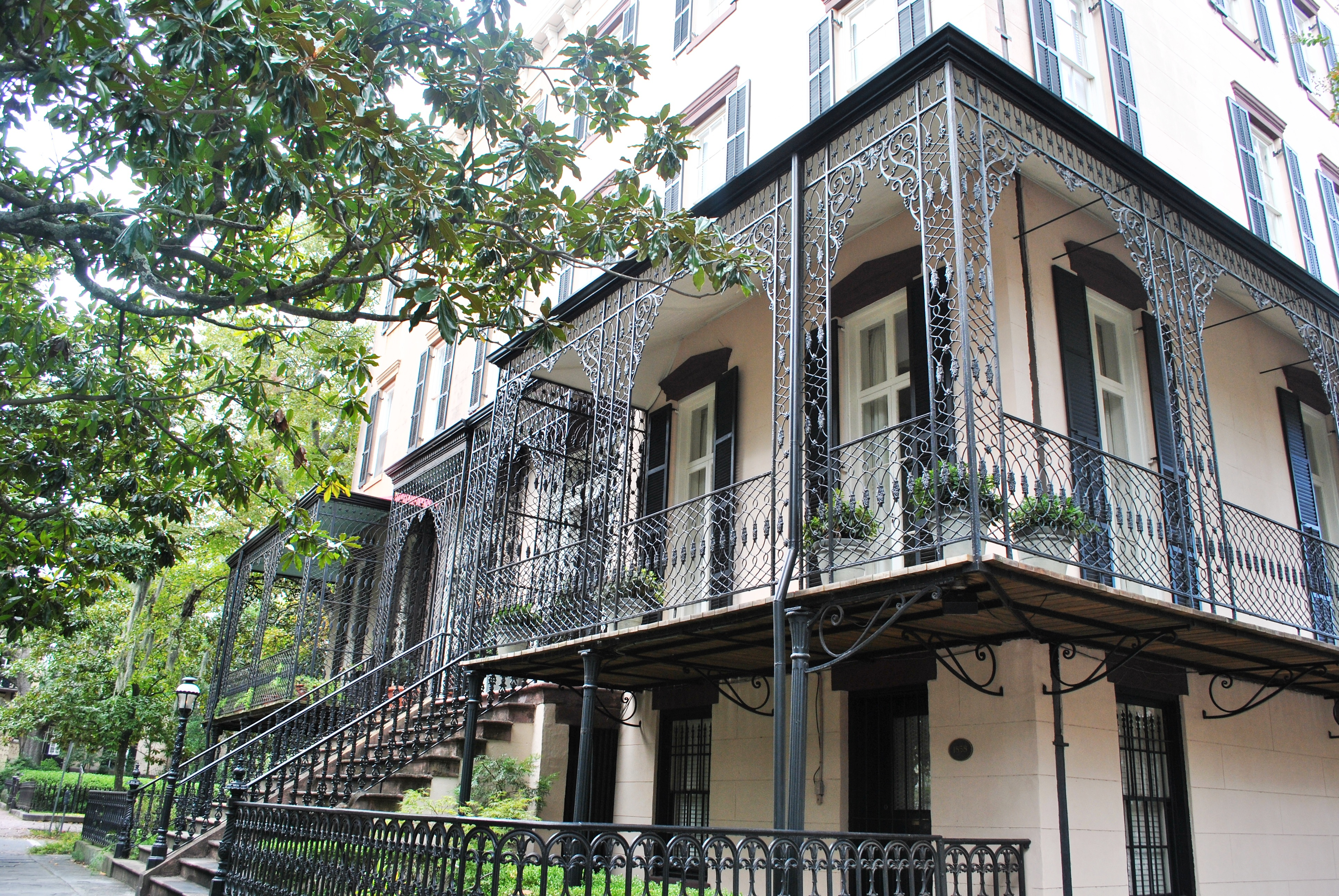
Revd. Charles W. Rogers House, 423–425 Bull Street

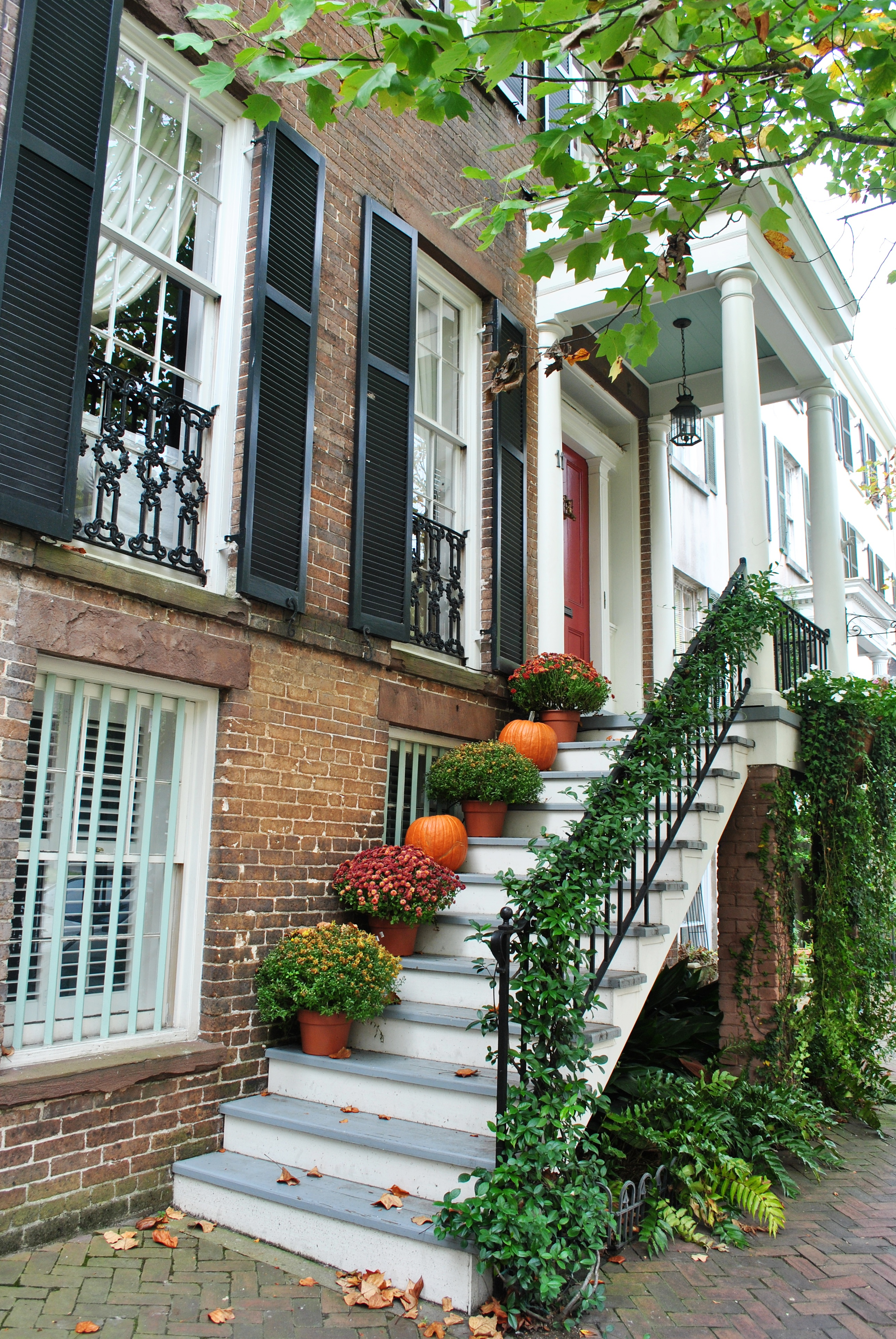
11 East Gordon Street

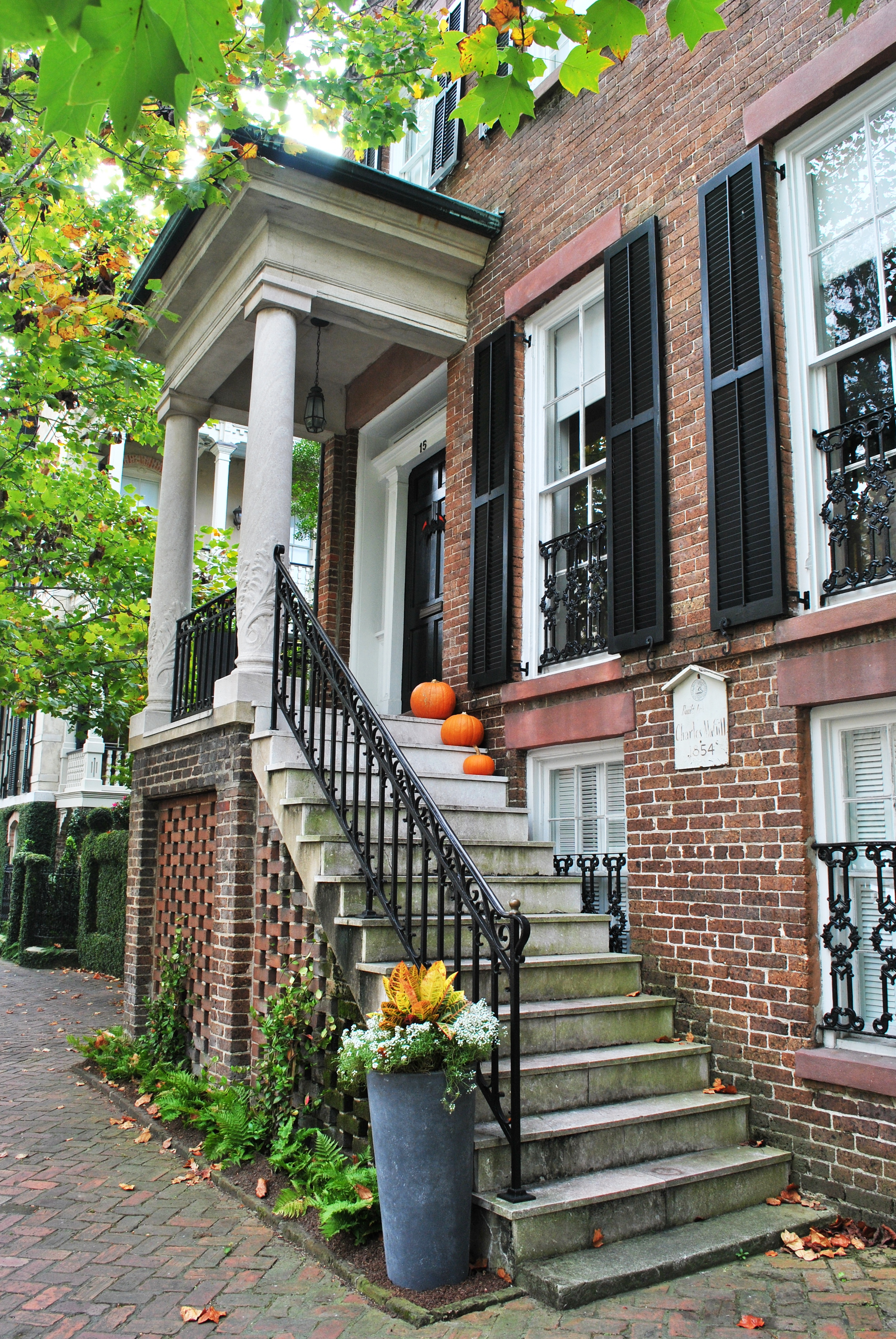
Charles McGill House, 15 East Gordon Street

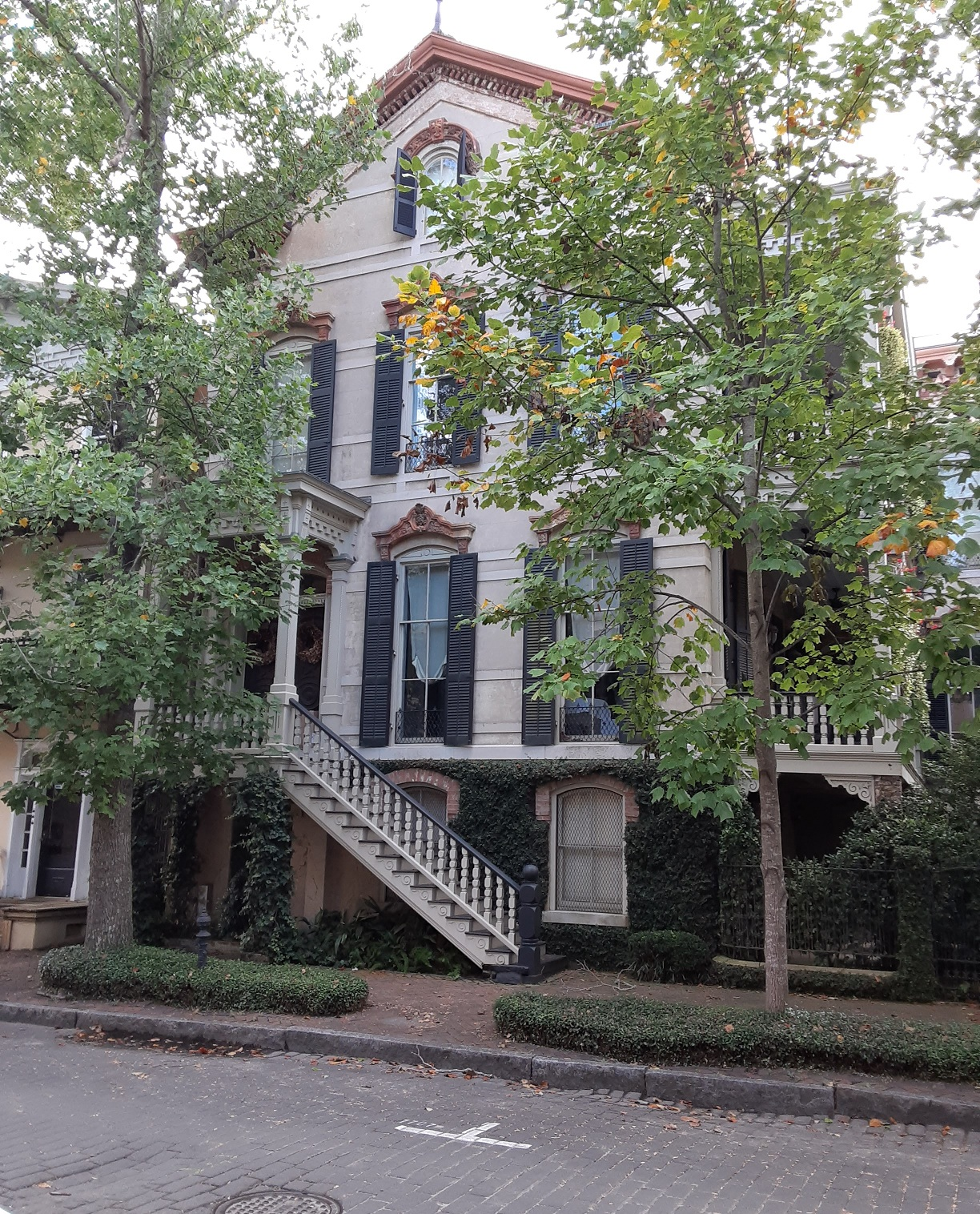
John Rowland House, 17–19 East Gordon Street

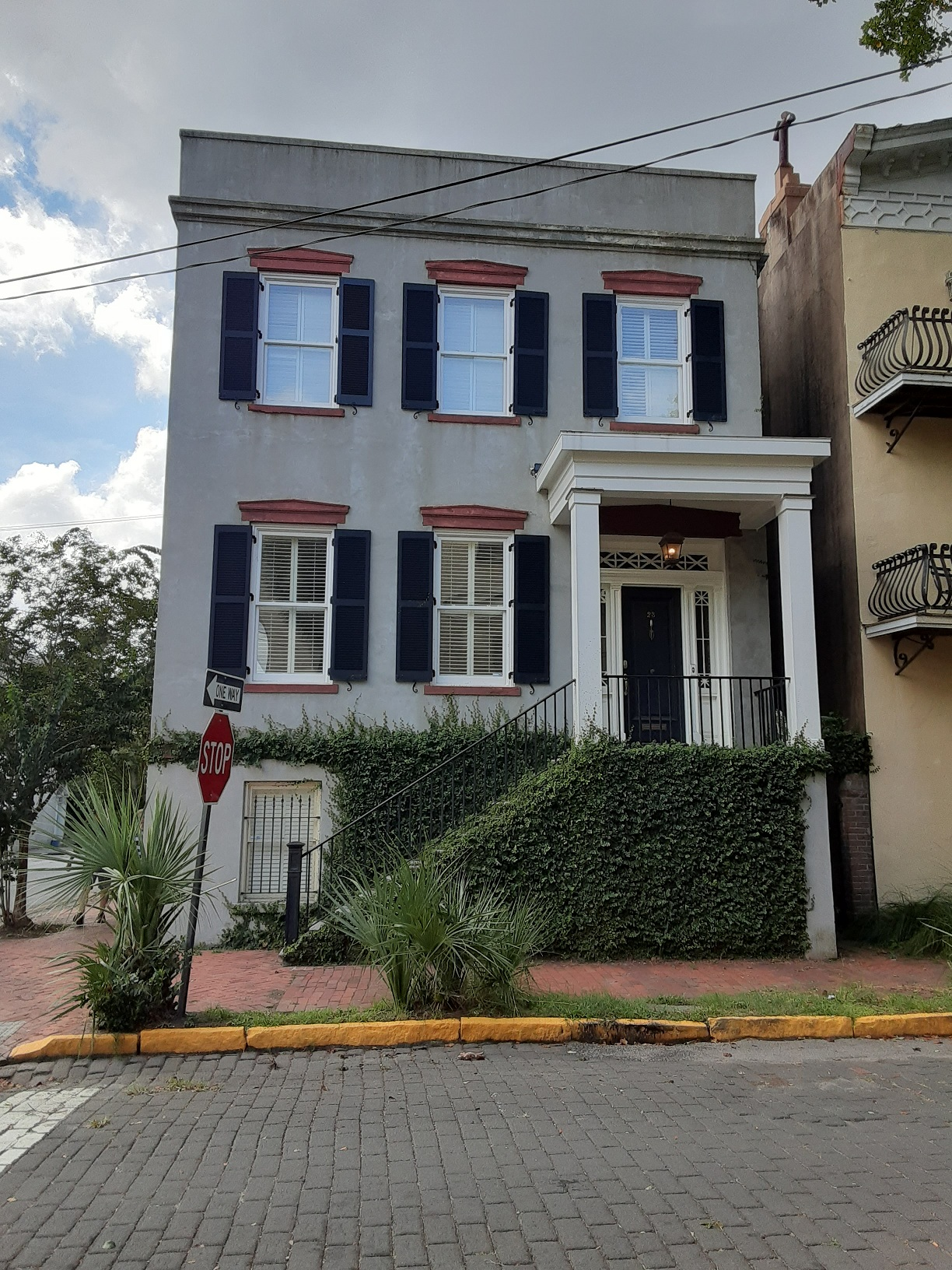
Frederick Groschaud House, 23 East Gordon Street

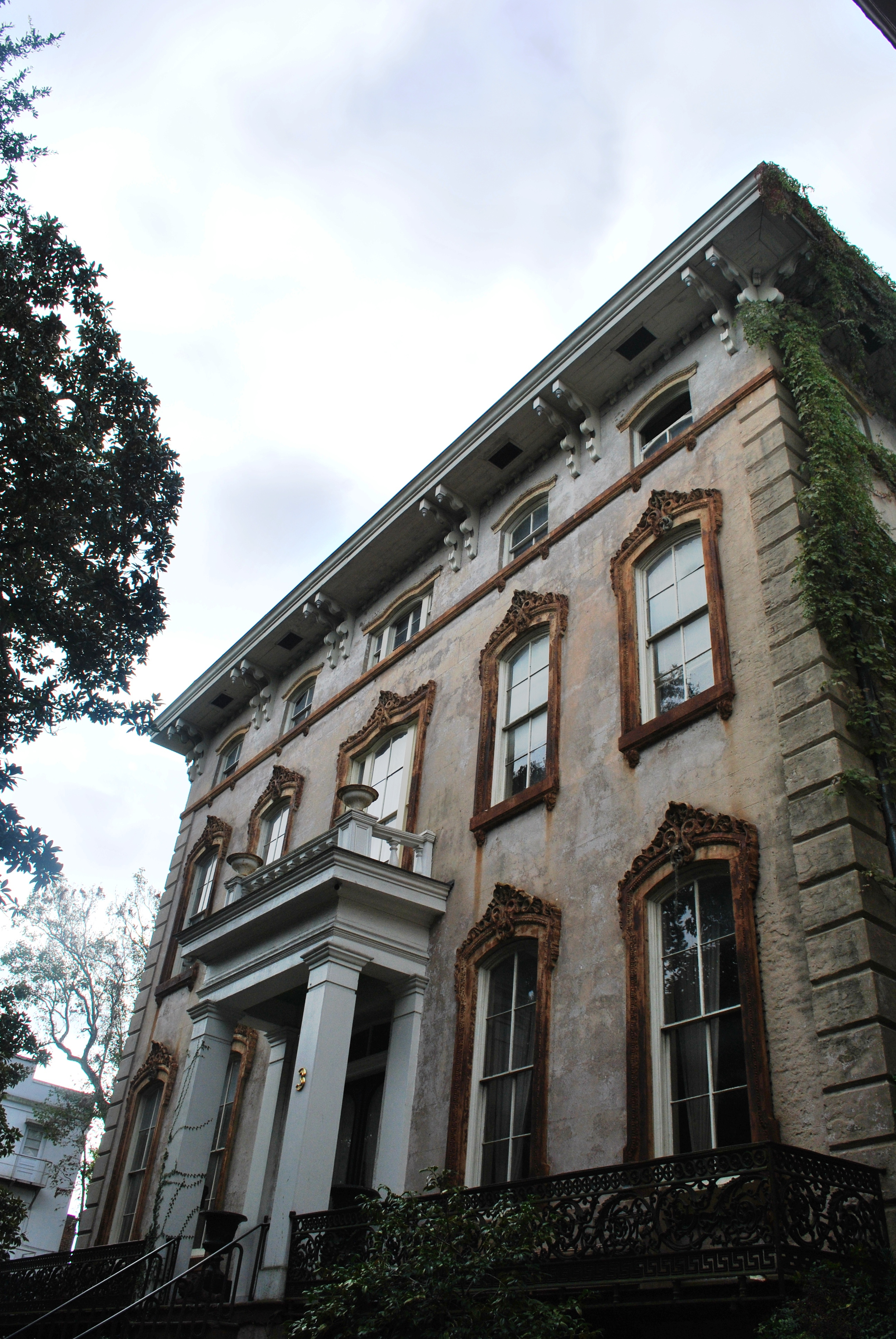
Noble Hardee Mansion, 3 West Gordon Street

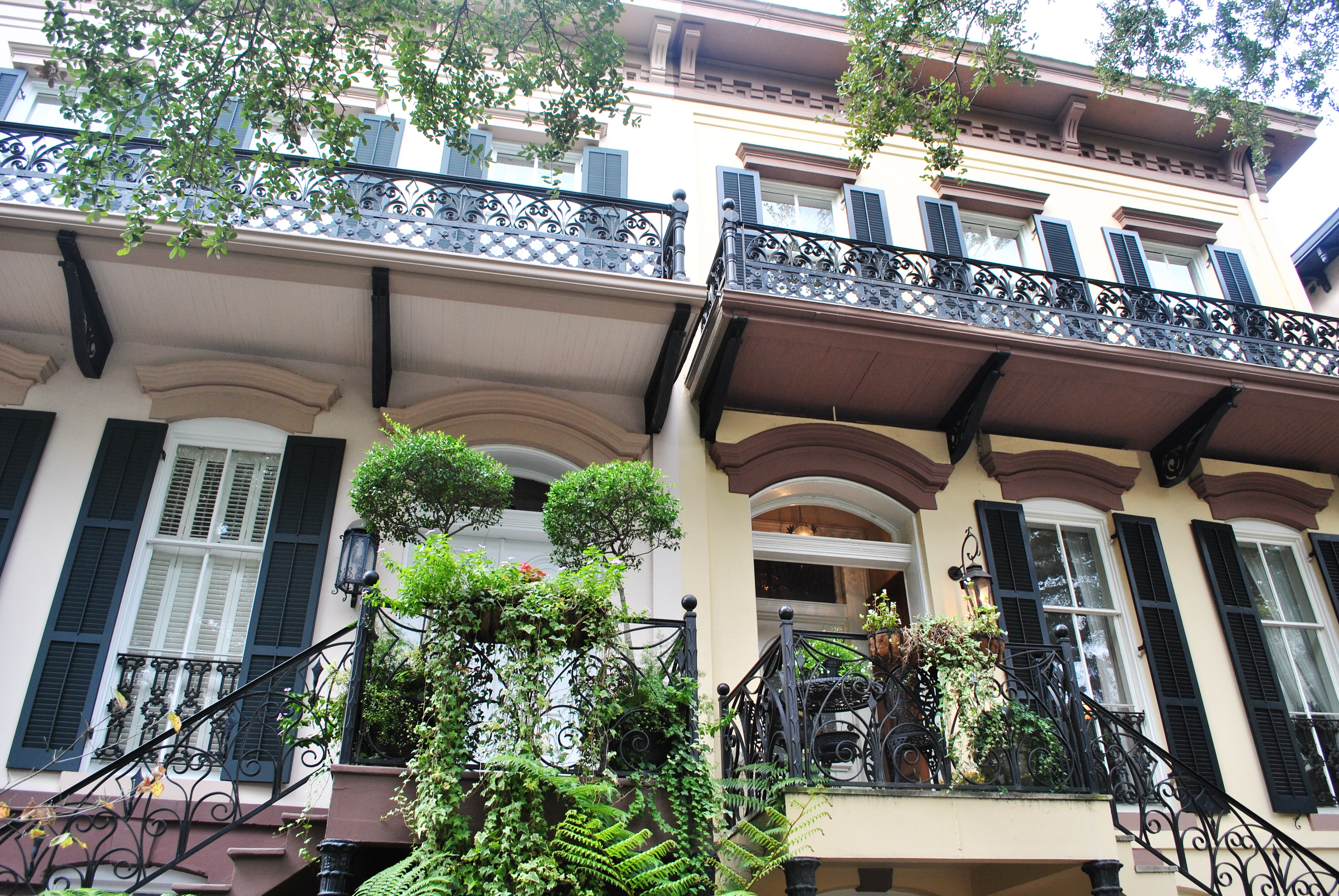
7–9 West Gordon Street

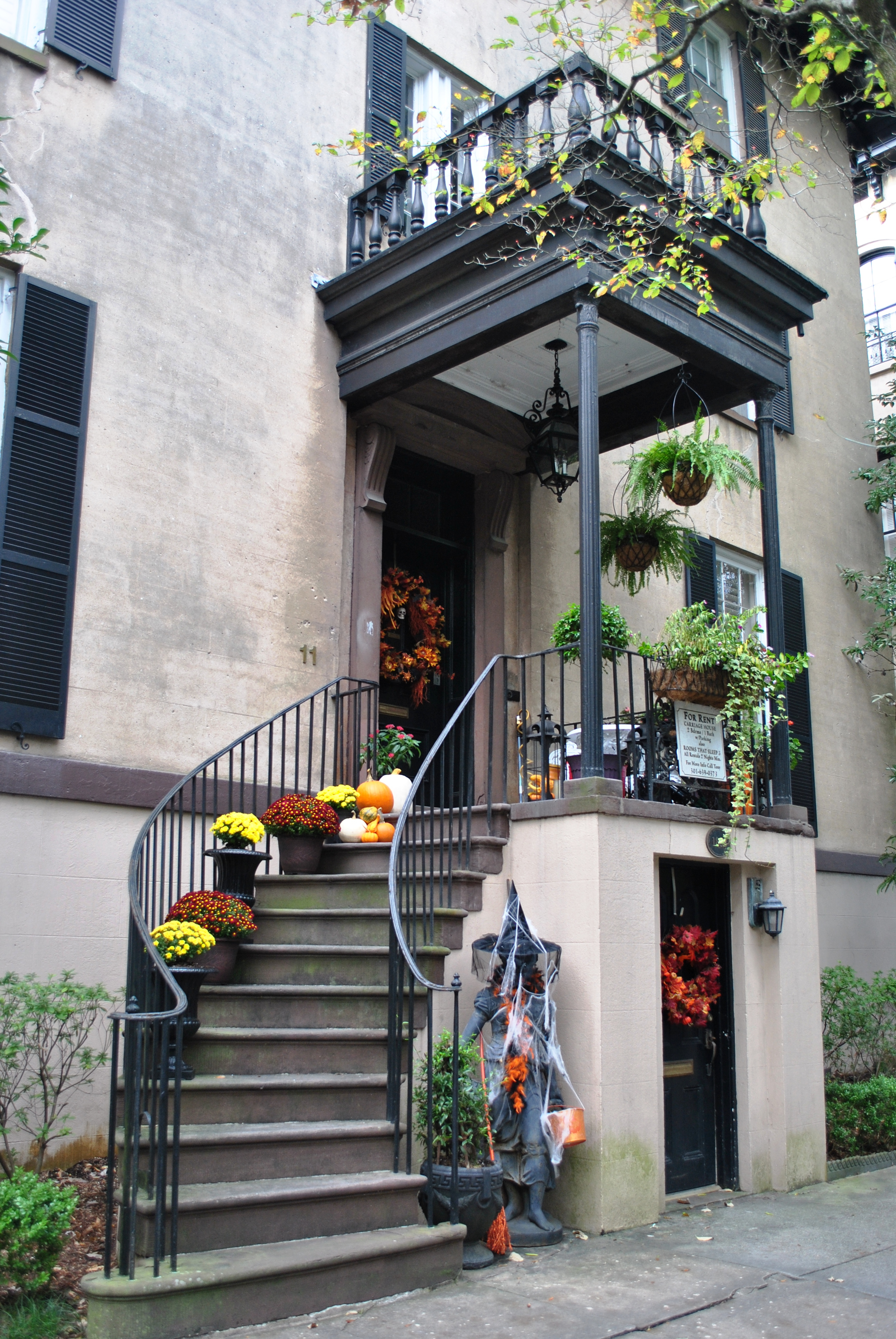
11 West Gordon Street, designed by John S. Norris

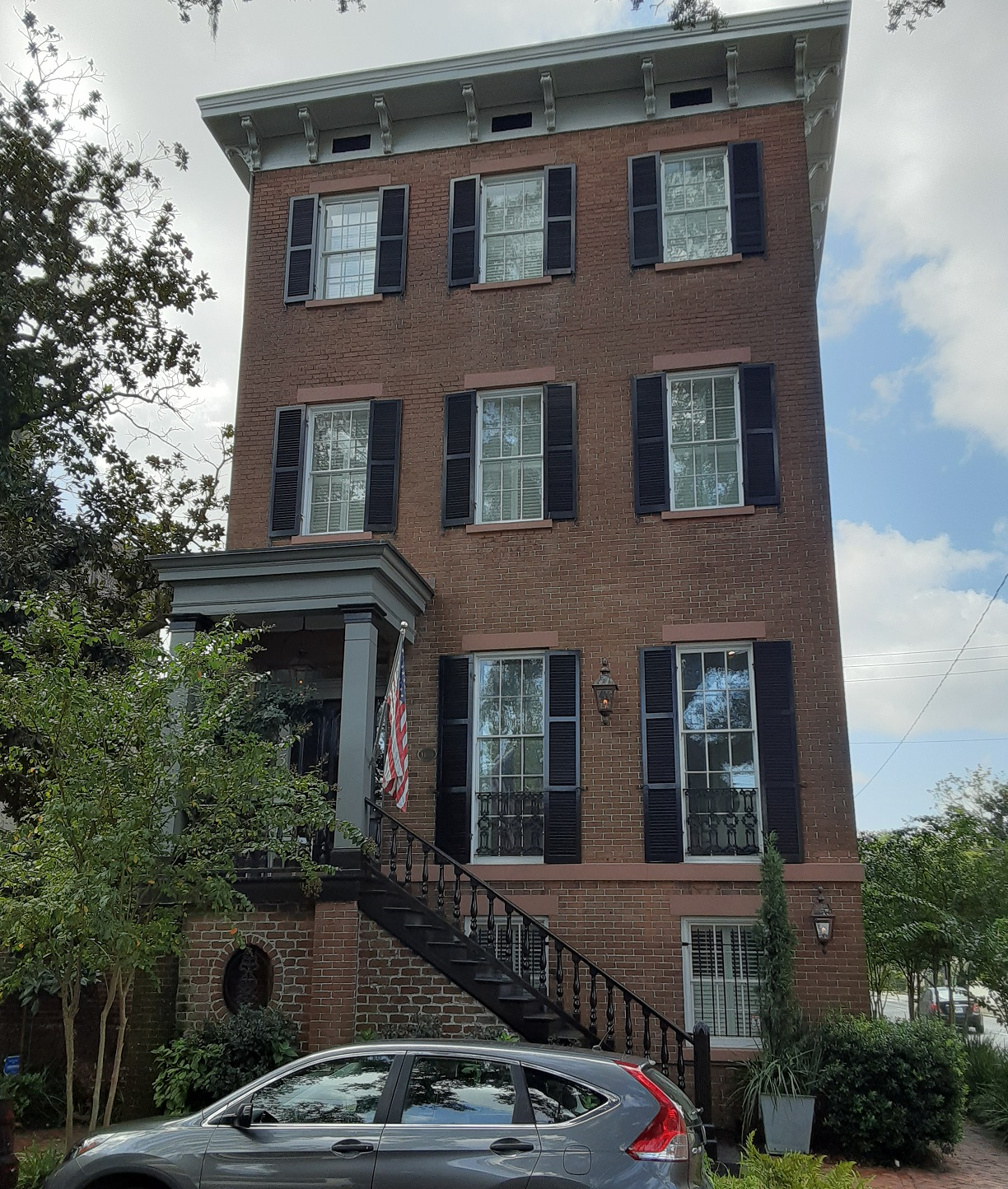
Joachim Saussy House, 23 West Gordon Street

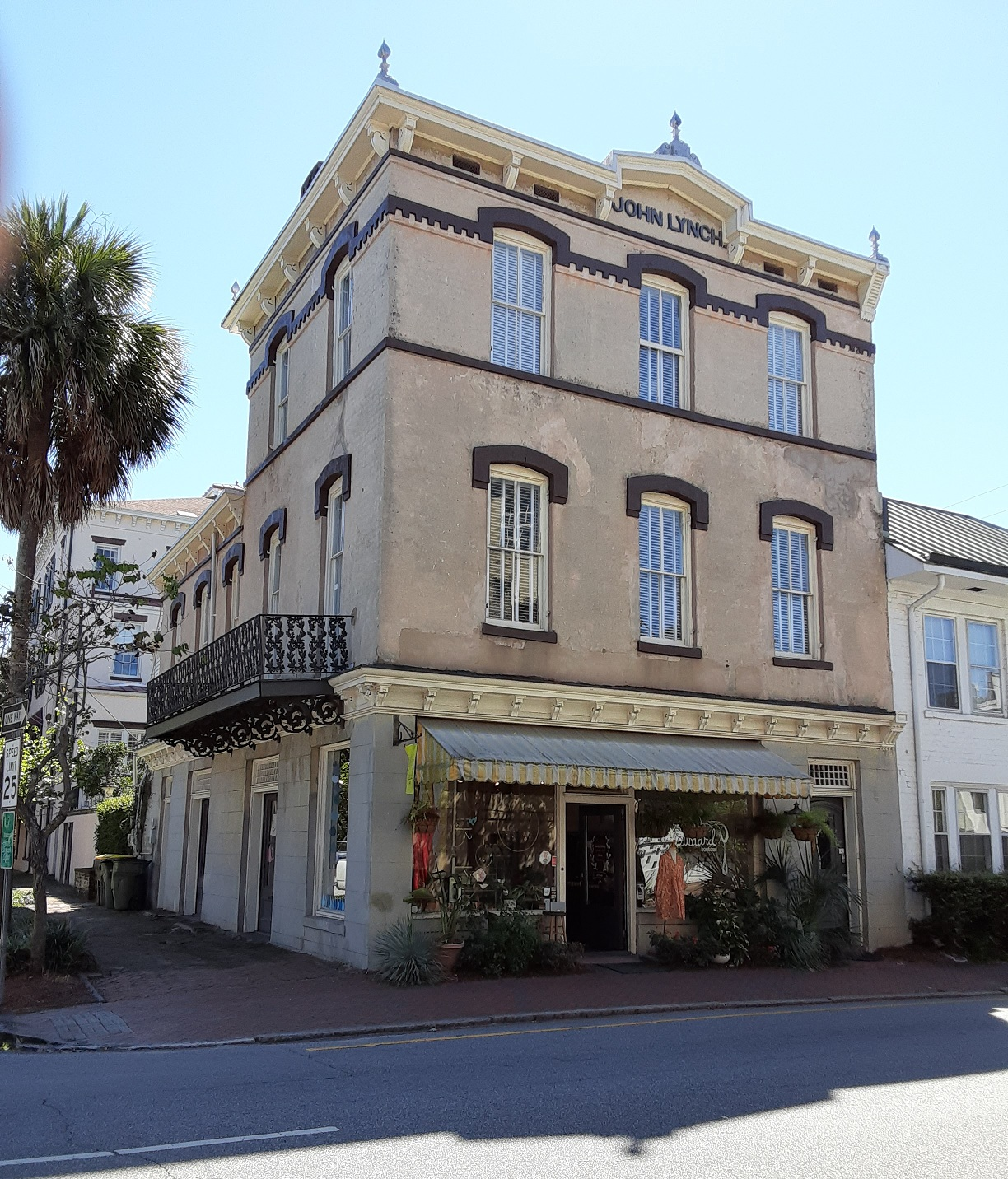
John Lynch Building, 422 Whitaker Street
