= Casimir Pulaski Monument (Savannah, Georgia) =

Monument in Savannah, Georgia, United States

Coordinates: 32.07135°N 81.09480°W

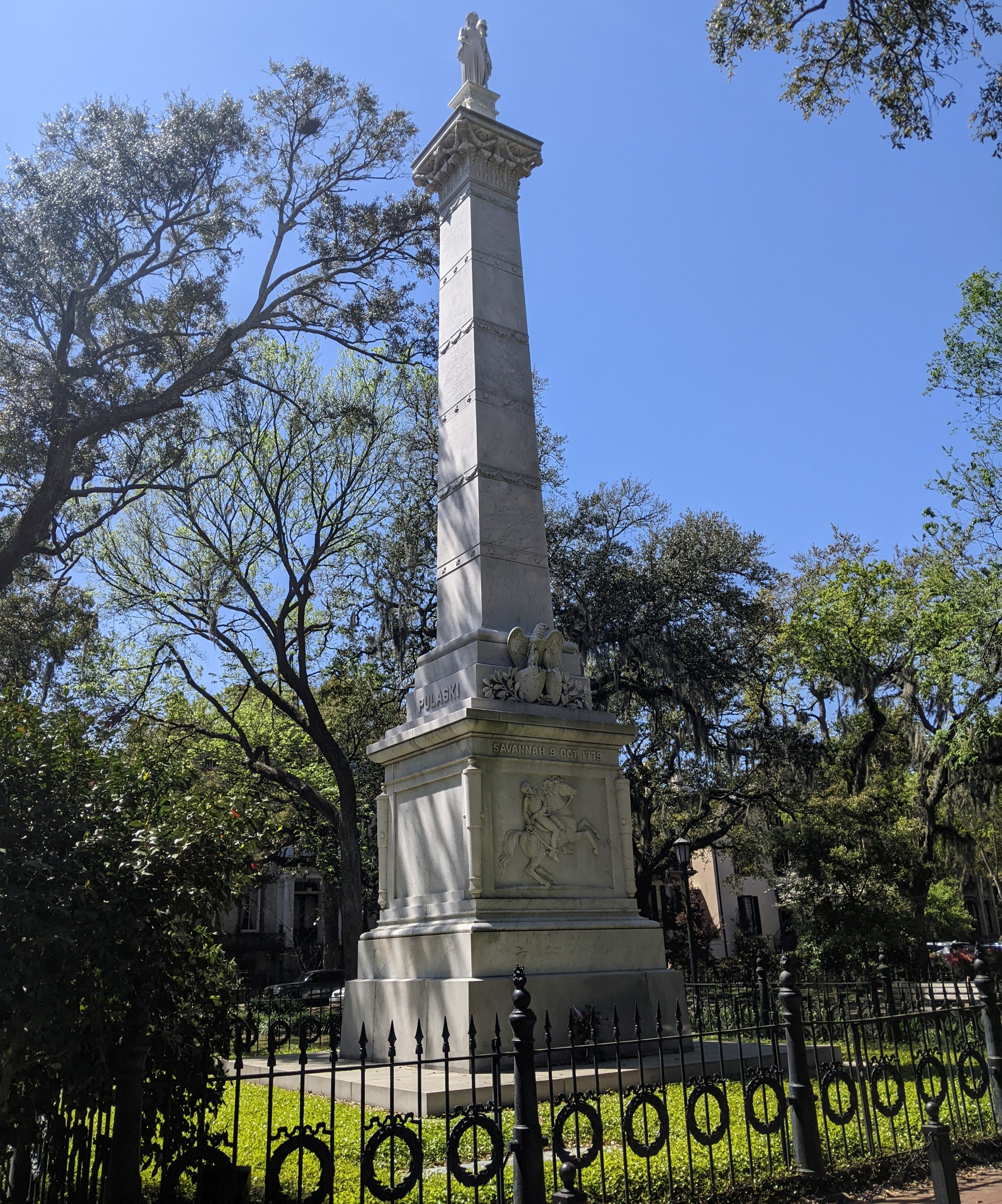
Casimir Pulaski monument in Savannah, Georgia.

The Casimir Pulaski Monument in Savannah, or Pulaski Monument on Monterey Square, is a 19th-century monument to Casimir Pulaski, in Monterey Square, on Bull Street, Savannah, Georgia, not far from the battlefield where Pulaski lost his life during the siege of Savannah.

The monument is one of the only two that still has a railing around it, the other being the Civil War Memorial in Forsyth Park.

== History ==
Sources vary with regards to when the cornerstone for the monument was placed, with either 1825 (involving the presence of Gilbert du Motier, Marquis de Lafayette) or 1853 being given. Coulter notes that the Lafayette cornerstone was originally located at Chippewa Square, but the funding proved insufficient to erect the monument at that time, and in 1853 it was moved to Monterey Square, where the monument would be erected. Construction of the monument at Monterey Square began after funding (approximately $17,000) was finally secured. The cornerstone was relaid on October 11, 1853 (anniversary of Pulaski's death). Nash notes it was unveiled in 1856; Knight, however, notes that the statue was dedicated on January 9, 1855. The monument is said, according to Knight, to have been "considered at the time one of the most elegant memorials in America." Alongside the monument, a body alleged to be Pulaski's was buried in it (recent genetic reexaminations of the body are conclusive that this was Pulaski).

Szczygielski notes that already on October 29, 1779 (Pulaski died on October 11 that year) the United States Congress passed a resolution that a monument should be dedicated to him. The Savannah monument, built over half a century later, was the first monument dedicated to Pulaski in the United States.

Work on restoration of the monument began in 1995.

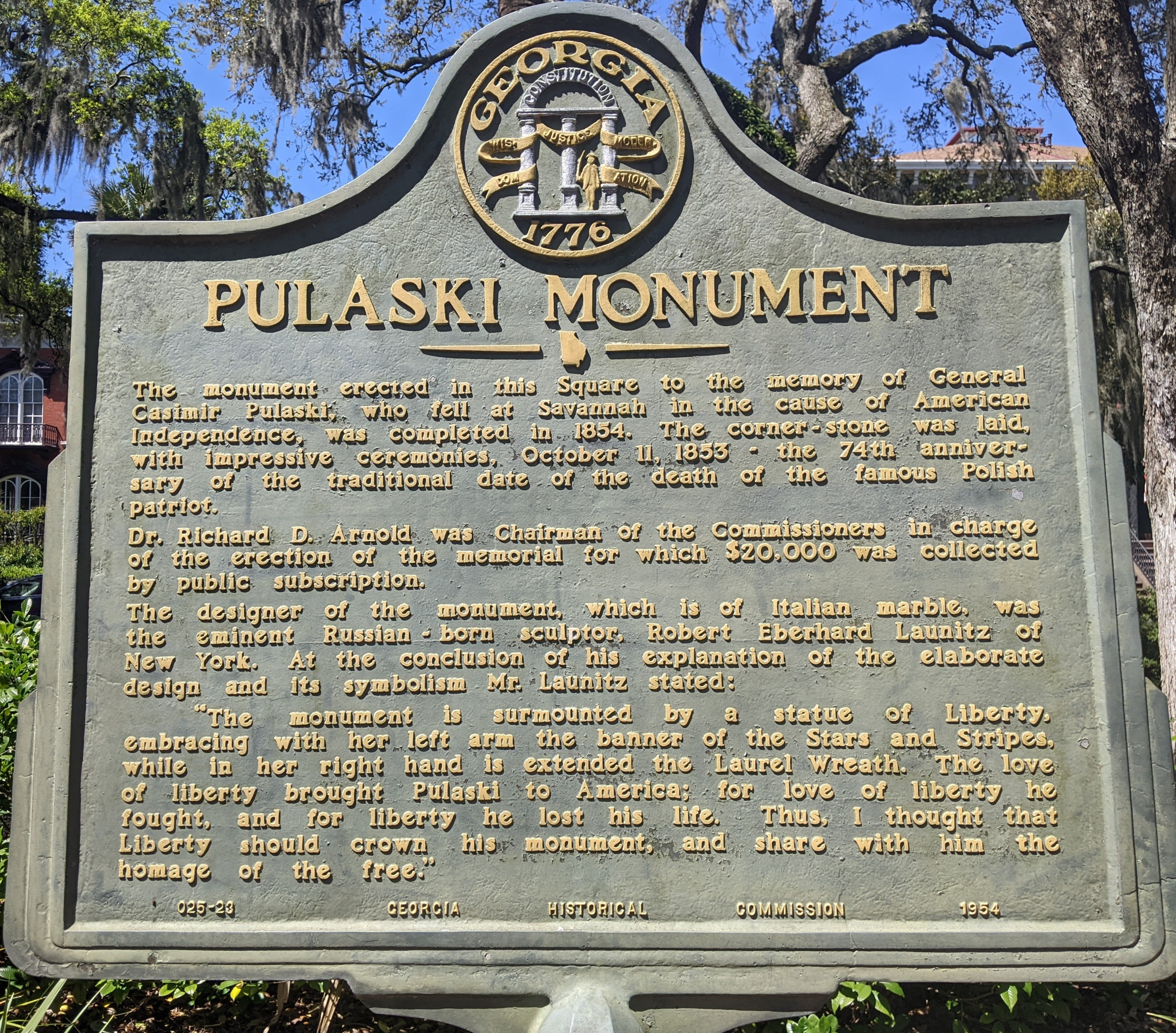
A historical marker for the Pulaski monument on Monterey Square in Savannah, Georgia.

== Description ==
The monument is made from Italian marble, with smaller elements of granite. It is 55 feet (17 m) tall. The monument has a bronze bas relief of mounted Pulaski, and is topped with a statue of Liberty, with the stars and stripes banner. The monument was designed by Robert Launitz. The bas relief was designed by Henryk Dmochowski, and shows the moment of Pulaski's death. Additional elements present on the monument include the coat of arms of Poland and the coat of arms of Georgia.

Inscription on the monument reads: "Pulaski, the Heroic Pole, who fell mortally wounded, fighting for American Liberty at the siege of Savannah, October 9, 1779."

== See also ==
- Fort Pulaski National Monument
