= Nancy Hillis =

American musician

- Hillis and Emma Kelly (at the piano) in 1994
- Born: Nancy Lee Hillis; March 19, 1948; Chattanooga, Tennessee, U.S.
- Died: August 9, 2016 (aged 68); Savannah, Georgia, U.S.
- Occupation: Musician
- Known for: Appearance in Midnight in the Garden of Good and Evil

Nancy Lee Hillis (March 19, 1948 – August 9, 2016) was an American musician. She came to prominence after her appearance as one of the main characters in John Berendt's 1994 true-crime book Midnight in the Garden of Good and Evil.

== Early life ==
Hillis was born in Chattanooga, Tennessee, in 1948. She was raised by her grandparents.

== Midnight in the Garden of Good and Evil ==
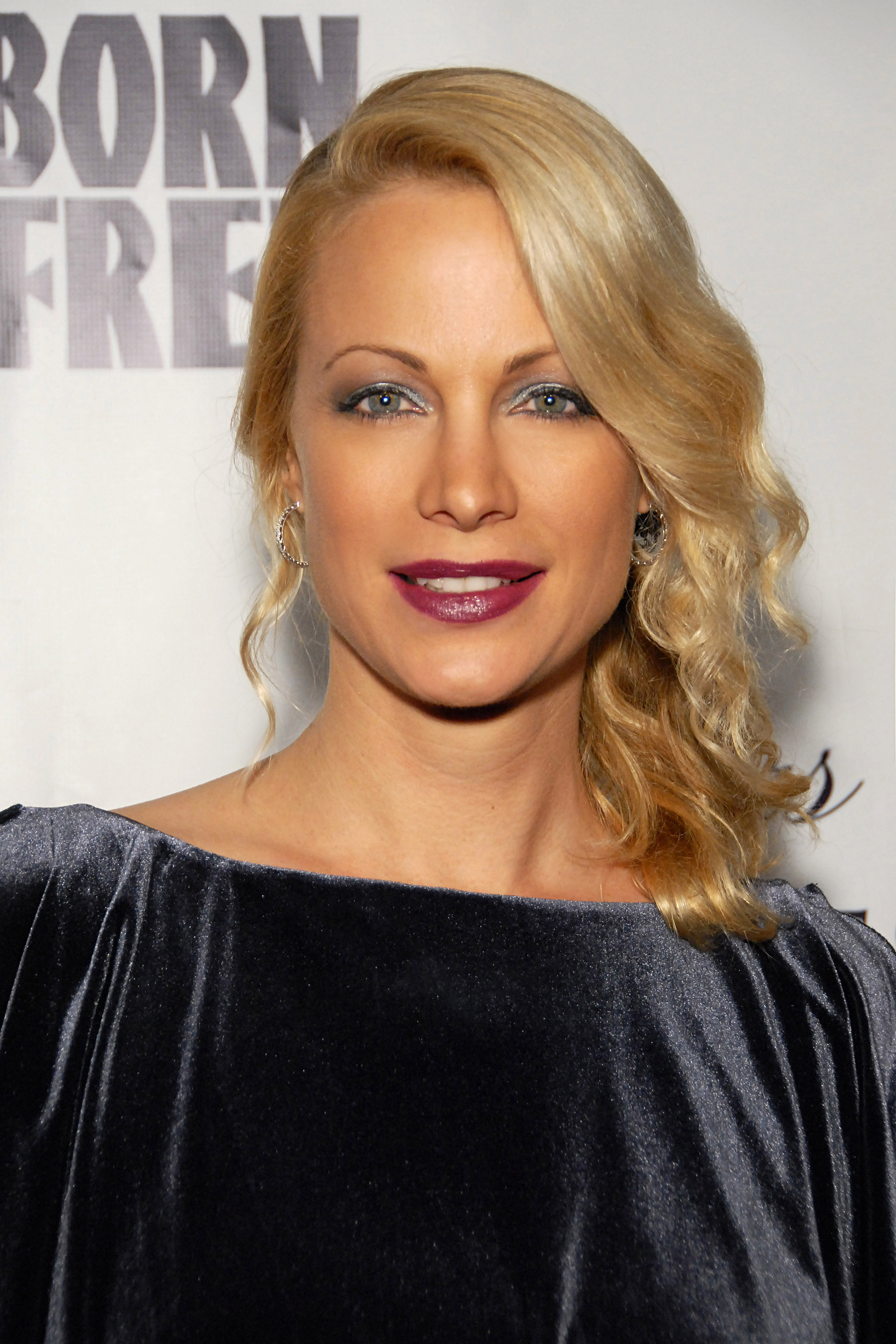
Alison Eastwood played Mandy Nicholls, the character based on Hillis, in the movie version of Midnight in the Garden of Good and Evil

In John Berendt's 1994 book Midnight in the Garden of Good and Evil, Hillis was renamed "Mandy Nicholls", the love interest of Joe Odom; however, Hillis stated that there was no romantic relationship between her and Odom, who was "not strictly heterosexual." They performed music together only and owned a bar, Sweet Georgia Brown's, in Savannah's City Market.

In 1991, Hillis purchased the Hamilton–Turner Inn in Savannah's Lafayette Square.

Hillis said that, contrary to what Berendt wrote, she and Odom did not meet until Odom had moved from 16 East Jones Street in Savannah to 101 East Oglethorpe Avenue, a three-storey townhouse at the corner of Drayton Street. From there, he moved to 126 West Harris Street in Pulaski Square.

Mandy Nicholls was portrayed by Alison Eastwood in her father's 1997 movie adaptation.

== Book ==
In 2015, Hillis released her biography, Nancy Hillis: The Vamp of Savannah, named after the song "Hard Hearted Hannah (The Vamp of Savannah)."

== Death ==
Hillis died at Savannah's Candler Hospital in 2016, aged 68, after a five-year battle with ALS.
