= Sweet Georgia Brown's =

Piano bar in Savannah, Georgia

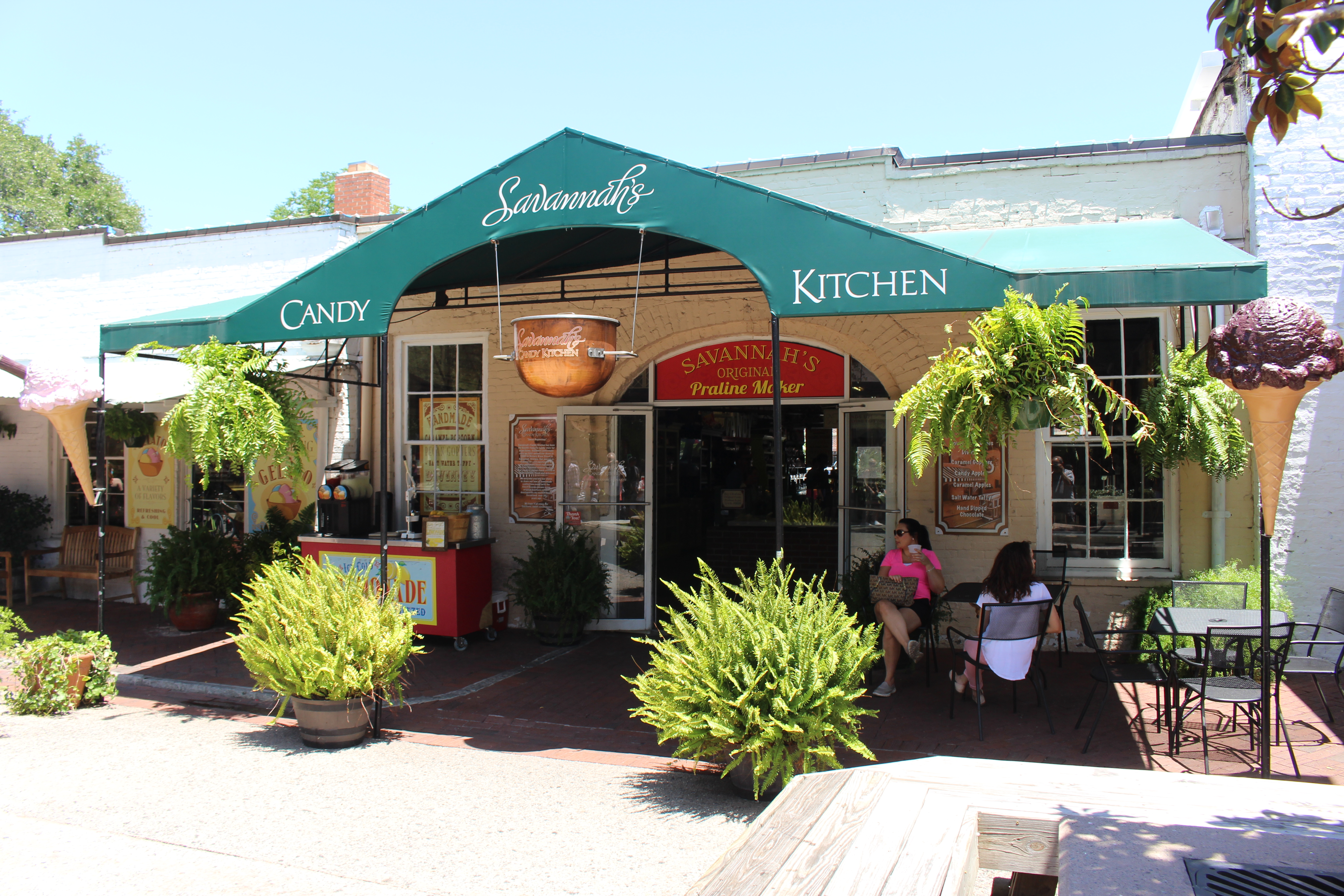
- Sweet Georgia Brown's was located in this building in Savannah's City Market
- Interactive map of the Sweet Georgia Brown's area

General information
- Location: Savannah, Georgia, U.S., 312 West St. Julian Street
- Coordinates: 32.0810°N 81.0952°W

Sweet Georgia Brown's was a piano bar in Savannah, Georgia. Located at 312 West St. Julian Street, on Franklin Square in Savannah's City Market, the bar was co-owned by musicians Joe Odom and Nancy Hillis, real-life characters in John Berendt's book Midnight in the Garden of Good and Evil (1994). "For over two years, it was the place everyone wanted to be in Savannah and everyone partied there until the wee hours," said Kathryn Gifford, a Savannah tour guide in 1997. Emma Kelly, dubbed the "Lady of 6,000 Songs" by Johnny Mercer, regularly played at the bar.

The bar, which opened in 1988, was named for "Sweet Georgia Brown", a song released in 1925 by Ben Bernie and Maceo Pinkard, with lyrics by Kenneth Casey.

A branch of Savannah's Candy Kitchen occupies the bar's former location today.
