= Joe Odom (attorney) =

American attorney and musician

- Born: Joseph Algerine Odom; March 22, 1948; Claxton, Georgia, US
- Died: November 2, 1991 (aged 43); Savannah, Georgia, US
- Occupations: Attorney, musician
- Known for: Appearance in Midnight in the Garden of Good and Evil

Joseph Algerine Odom (March 22, 1948 – November 2, 1991) was an American attorney who later became a musician. He came to prominence after his appearance as one of the main characters in John Berendt's 1994 true-crime book Midnight in the Garden of Good and Evil.

== Early life ==
Odom was born in Claxton, Georgia, in 1948, to Herman and Gwendolyn. He later moved to Savannah, where he was a "ne'er-do-well" attorney, based on West Broad Street.

He became a proficient jazz pianist and a ballroom dancer.

== Midnight in the Garden of Good and Evil ==
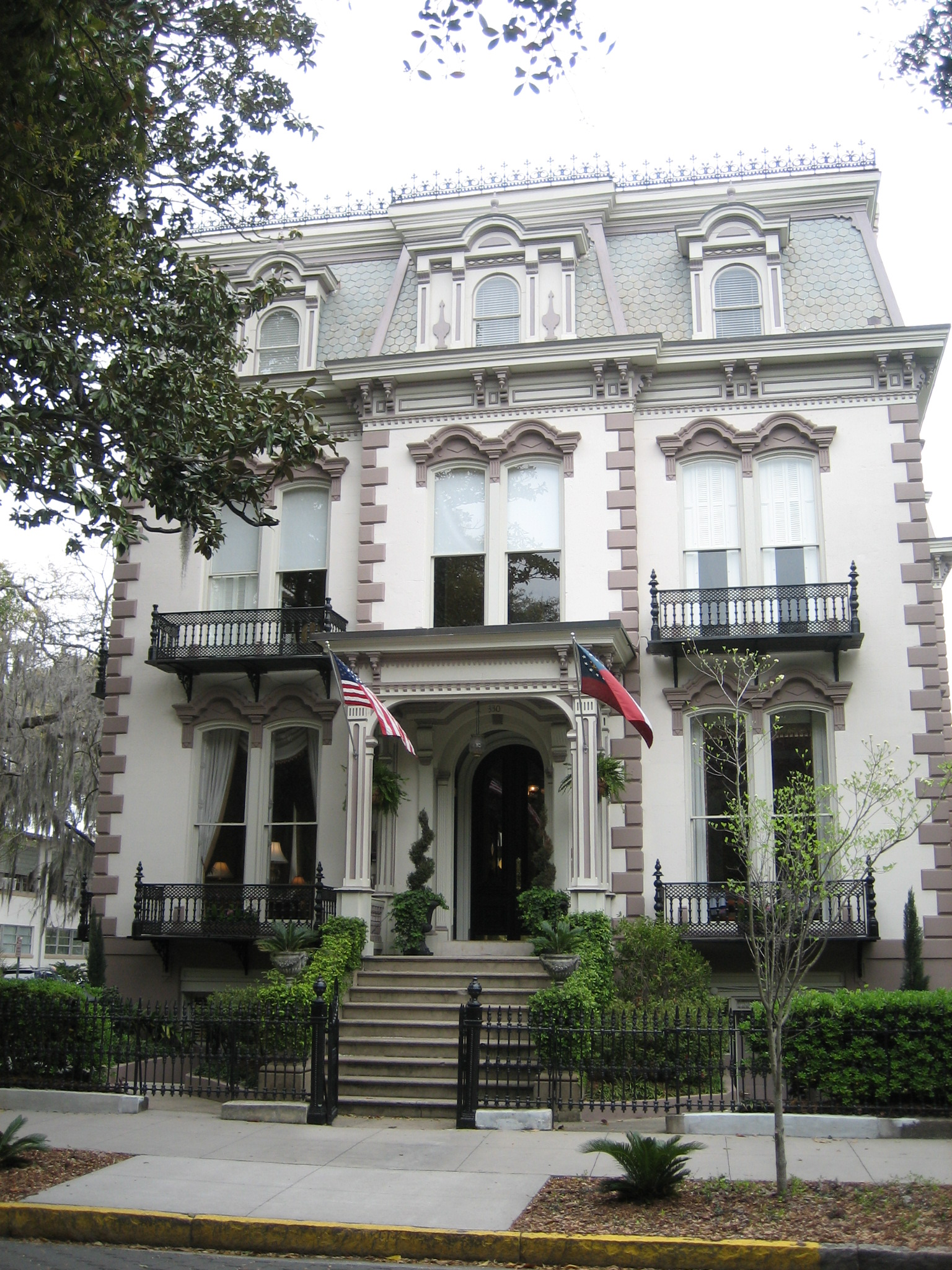
Hamilton–Turner Inn, owned by Nancy Hillis, where Odom lived at the time of his death

In John Berendt's 1994 book Midnight in the Garden of Good and Evil, Odom was portrayed as the love interest of Mandy Nicholls; however, Nancy Hillis, upon whom Nicholls was based, stated that there was no romantic relationship between her and Odom, who was "not strictly heterosexual." They performed music together only and owned a bar, Sweet Georgia Brown's, in Savannah's City Market.

Odom was also friends with and a business partner of Emma Kelly, dubbed by Johnny Mercer as the "lady of 6,000 songs", who also appears in the book. Kelly and Odom opened Emma's, a piano bar in a former cotton warehouse on Savannah's River Street. It was forced to close after Odom squandered its takings. "He could do you wrong. And he did me wrong," Kelly said in 1997. "But I miss Joe. I get a little teary-eyed thinking about him. He had a flair for coming up with good ideas."

Hillis said that, contrary to what Berendt wrote, she and Odom did not meet until Odom had moved from 16 East Jones Street in Savannah to 101 East Oglethorpe Avenue, a three-storey townhouse at the corner of Drayton Street. From there, he moved to 126 West Harris Street in Pulaski Square.

During his time at today's Hamilton–Turner Inn, on Lafayette Square, Odom hosted tours of the property and, much to the chagrin of the square's residents, hosted loud parties at the home.

"I saw Joe Odom playing the piano all the time," said Berendt in 2015. "I thought he was fascinating, charming, and so easygoing the way he just floated around town. Southern charm. I was very taken with him."

Odom died three years before the book's release. He was portrayed by Paul Hipp in Clint Eastwood's 1997 movie adaptation.

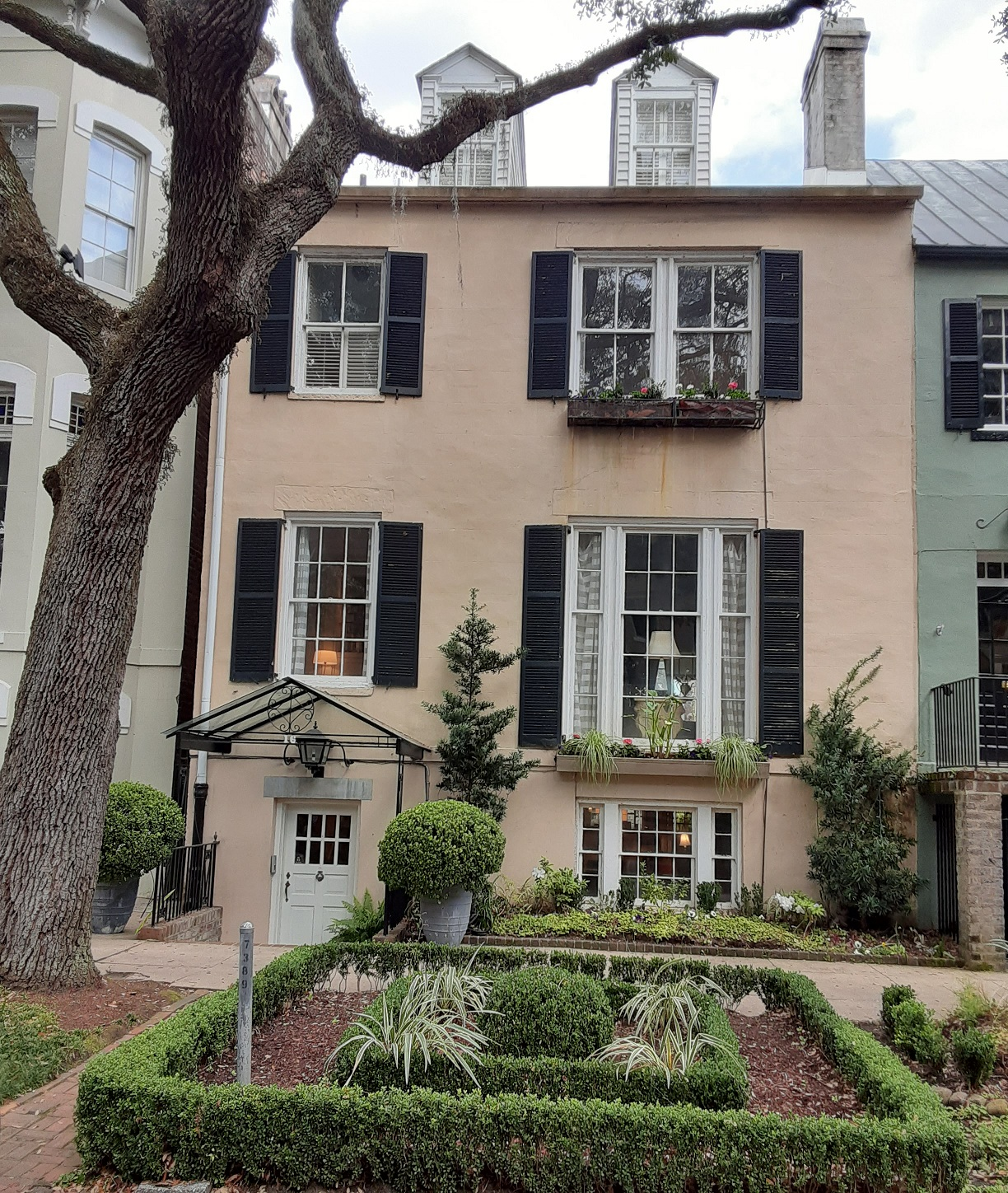
One of Odom's former residences in Savannah, 16 East Jones Street

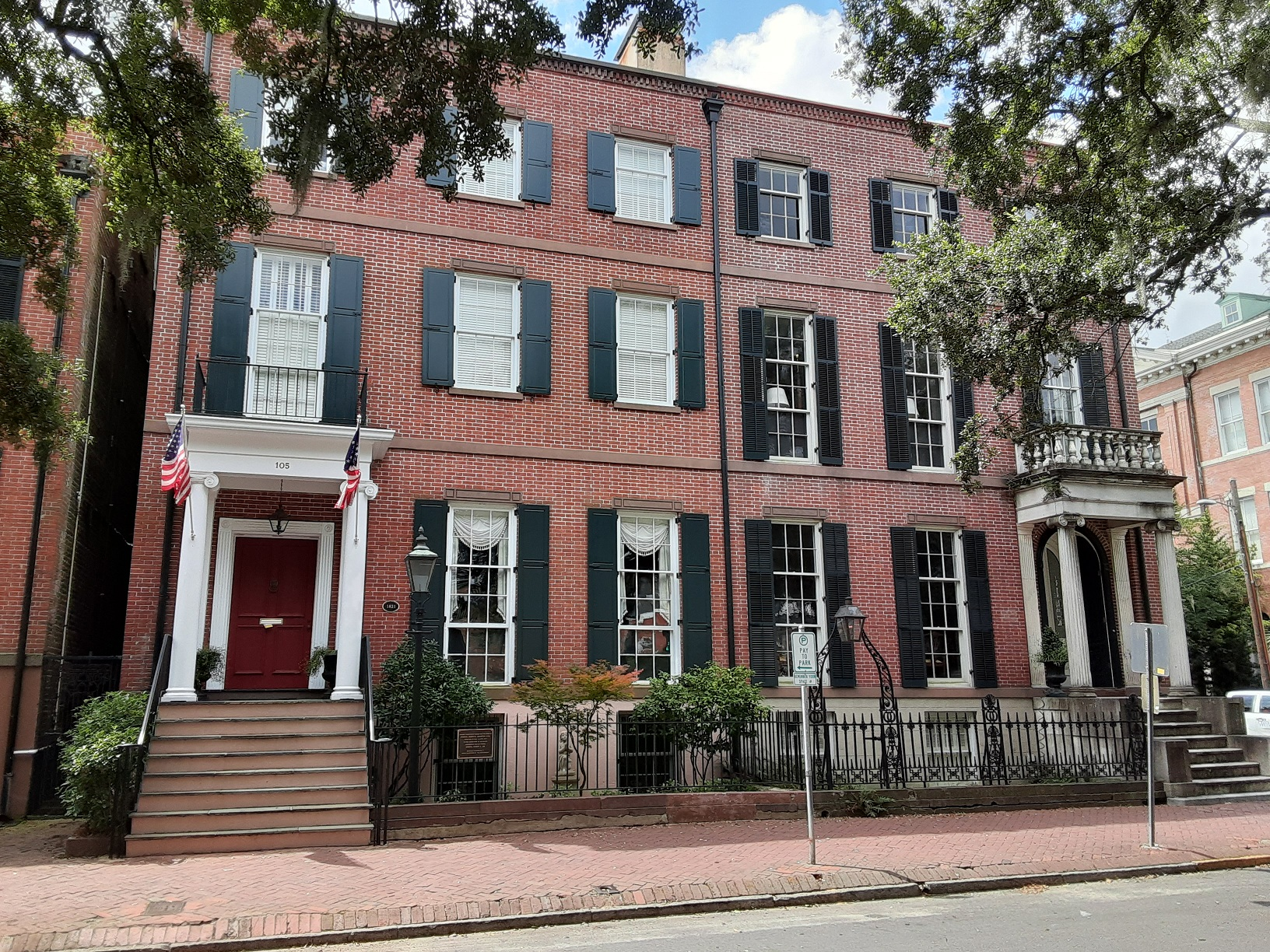
He moved to 101 East Oglethorpe (right) shortly before meeting Nancy Hillis for the first time

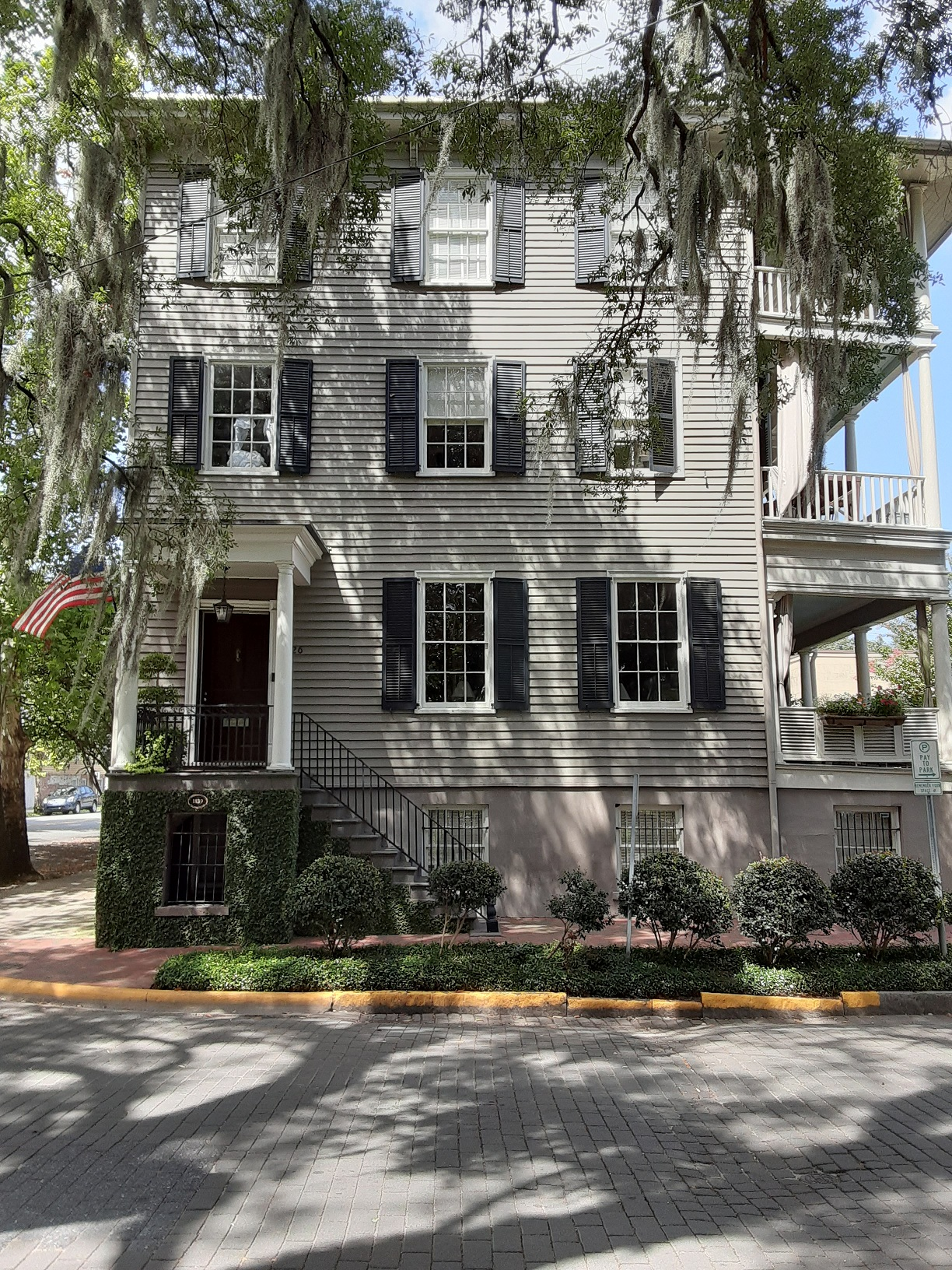
His third home was 126 West Harris Street in Pulaski Square

== Death ==
Odom died in 1991, from complications of AIDS. He was 43, and was living at the time in an apartment inside Savannah's Hamilton–Turner Inn, which Nancy Hillis purchased in 1991. He is buried in a family plot in Bull Creek Cemetery in his hometown of Claxton, beside his parents. After the death of her husband of 56 years, his mother was married to Aubrey Strickland until her death in 2013.
