= Hamilton–Turner Inn =

Building in Savannah, Georgia, US

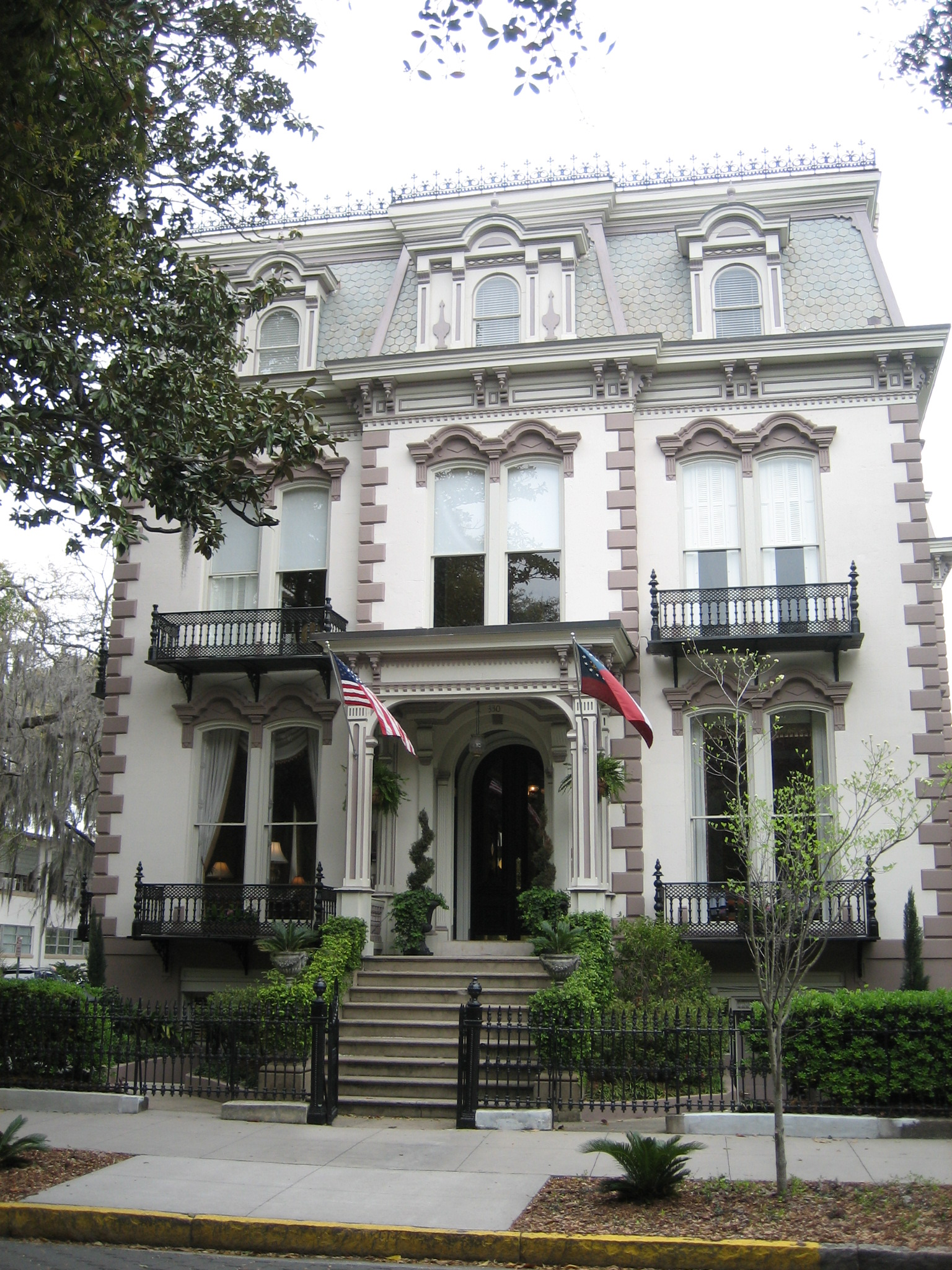
- The mansion's façade in 2008
- Interactive map of the Hamilton–Turner Inn area

General information
- Architectural style: Second Empire
- Location: 330 Abercorn Street, Savannah, Georgia, United States
- Coordinates: 32.07265°N 81.09119°W
- Completed: 1873 (153 years ago)

The Hamilton–Turner Inn (also known as the Hamilton–Turner House and the Samuel P. Hamilton House) is a historic mansion in Savannah, Georgia, United States. Built in 1873, it is located at 330 Abercorn Street in the southeastern trust/civic lot of Lafayette Square. It is now a luxury inn.

Virginia native Samuel Pugh Hamilton (1837–1899), colloquially known as the Lord of Lafayette Square, had the mansion built for his family. He and his wife, Sarah Virginia (née Stillings) (1836–1920), "created a social center for the city's elite" with their home.

Sarah, his deceased brother's widow, was Hamilton's second wife, whom he married on June 10, 1866; his first, Emma Sprigg, died around 1862, after having two children with Hamilton.

Due to Hamilton's work with the Brush Electric Light & Power Company, the Hamilton's mansion was the first home in Savannah with electricity, for in 1883, lights were installed in its salon. The rest of the house was fitted with lights by 1886.

The mansion survived Savannah's fire of 1898 that nearly destroyed the nearby Cathedral of St. John the Baptist. This was, in part, due to the Connecticut limestone roof, which prevented it from being engulfed by the flames.

Hamilton died in 1899, in his early sixties. He and his wife, who survived him by 21 years, are buried in Savannah's Bonaventure Cemetery.

In 1915, Dr. Francis Turner (1884–1961) purchased the mansion from the Hamiltons, and lived there with his family until 1926.

The home was then opened for boarding and became a home for the nurses of the Marine Hospital in 1928, before the Turner family moved back in during the 1940s.

The Turners sold the property to the Cathedral of St. John the Baptist in 1965. The latter wanted to demolish the structure to make a playground for their nearby school, but the Historic Savannah Foundation stepped in, and the mansion was saved.

The home is featured in John Berendt's 1994 book Midnight in the Garden of Good and Evil as the scene of raucous parties held by its resident Joe Odom. Nancy Hillis, on whom the book's character Mandy Nicholls was based, later owned the property.

Three years after the book's release, around the time of the film adaptation, Charles and Sue Strickland converted the mansion into luxury suites.

In 2023, Laura and Jason Boehm became the owners of the mansion.

== Gallery ==
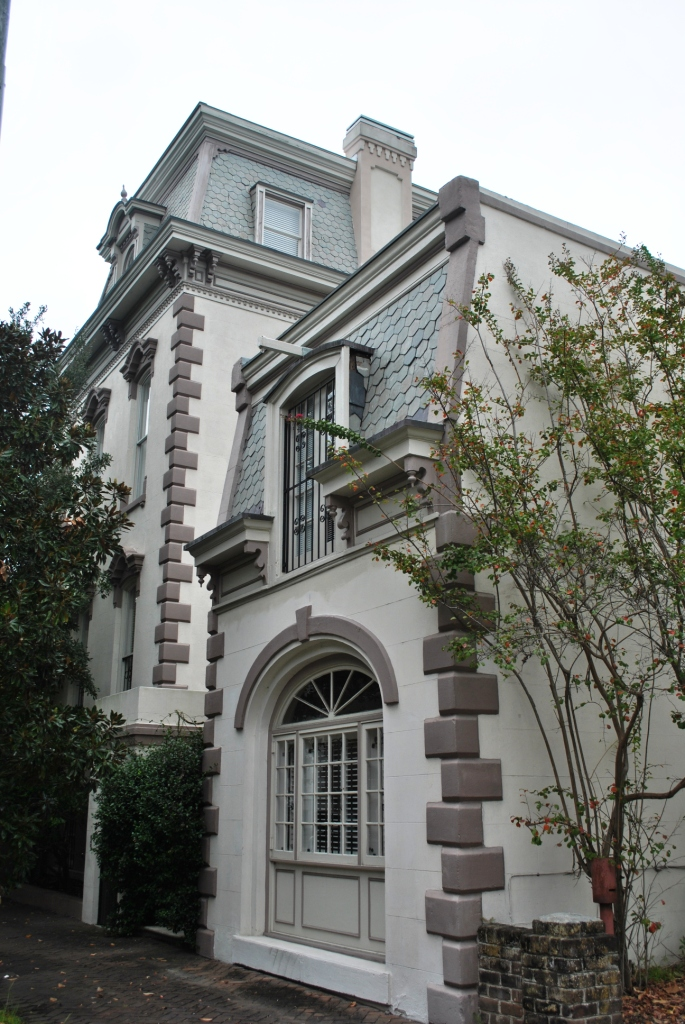
The mansion's carriage house

== See also ==
- Buildings in Savannah Historic District
