= Emma Kelly =

American musician

- Kelly (at the piano) and Nancy Hillis in 1994

Background information
- Born: December 17, 1918; Statesboro, Georgia
- Died: January 17, 2001 (aged 82) Savannah, Georgia
- Occupation: Musician
- Instrument: Piano
- Years active: 1940s–1980s

Emma Thompson Kelly (December 17, 1918 – January 17, 2001) was an American musician. Known as the "Lady of 6,000 Songs", she appeared in both John Berendt's 1994 book Midnight in the Garden of Good and Evil and its 1997 movie adaptation, directed by Clint Eastwood.

Her nickname was given to her by Johnny Mercer, who—after challenging her to play numerous songs he named—estimated she knew 6,000 songs from memory.

== Early life ==
Kelly was born in 1918 in Statesboro, Georgia, to William F. Thompson and Sarah Pauline Cave. It was her mother's second marriage, her first husband having died eleven years into their marriage, from which Emma gained a step sister, Llewellyn. Emma was the Thompsons' second child, after Josephine.

Known as "Mrs. Emma", she began dabbling on the piano at the age of three. When her mother heard her trying to play "Jesus Loves Me", she taught it to her. During her childhood, Kelly attended New Hope Methodist Church, on Georgia State Route 24.

== Career ==
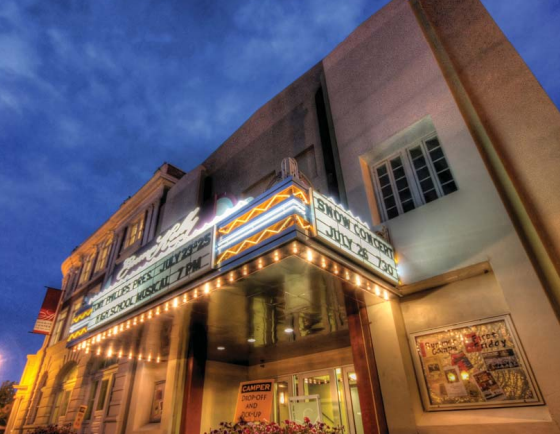
Emma Kelly Theater in Statesboro, Georgia

During World War II, Kelly played events for United Service Organizations at Fort Stewart in southeast Georgia.

For most of her life, Kelly drove around southern Georgia to play piano at various events, including daily visits to Savannah. On Sunday mornings, she was guaranteed to be found attending her church, First Baptist in Statesboro, even if she had returned home from an event in the early hours. Kelly played the piano for the Sunday school and sang in the church choir. In September 1985, she became co-owner, with Joe Odom, of Emma's Piano Lounge in an old cotton warehouse on River Street in Savannah. She held her 70th birthday party there in 1988. The bar was forced to close in 1991 after Odom squandered its earnings. Odom died that November, aged 43. "He could do you wrong. And he did me wrong," Kelly said in 1997. "But I miss Joe. I get a little teary-eyed thinking about him. He had a flair for coming up with good ideas."

In the fall of 1987, John Berendt, author of Midnight in the Garden of Good and Evil, accompanied Kelly to a Sunday church service in Vidalia, Georgia. Berendt recounted the day in a chapter of the book dedicated to Kelly.

For the past forty years, Emma Kelly has spent the better part of her waking hours driving across the landscape of south Georgia to play piano wherever she was needed. All anyone had to do was ask, and she would be there―in Swainsboro, Ellabell, Hazlehurst, Newington, Jesup and Jimps.

— John Berendt, Midnight in the Garden of Good and Evil

Berendt also stated that, regardless of engagements such as those above and her Sunday commitment in Stateboro, she would always play at the Rotary Club lunch on Monday, the Lions on Tuesday and the Kiwanis on Thursday.

Upon the release of Berendt's book, in January 1994, Kelly played the piano aboard the Savannah River Queen ferry, in the presence of the author, in a feature for Good Morning America. She was shown performing Johnny Mercer's "Pardon My Southern Accent". Clint Eastwood rewrote the script for the book's screenplay to include a scene with Kelly.

In 1994, she was performing weekly sittings at Hard Hearted Hannah's East, above the Pirates' House in Savannah. The bar was named for "Hard Hearted Hannah (The Vamp of Savannah)", a 1924 song by Jack Yellen, Bob Bigelow and Charles Bates.

== Personal life ==
Kelly was married to George Ross Kelly, a sign painter, for 47 years — from 1936 until his death from a heart attack in 1983 at the age of 70. Together, they had ten children. G. Ross Kelly, one of her sons, released a book titled What's Your Favorite Song? about his mother in 2015.

== Death ==
Kelly died in 2001 from a liver ailment. She was 82. She was interred in Eastside Cemetery in Statesboro.

== Accolades and legacy ==
Kelly was inducted into the Georgia Music Hall of Fame in 1998. She performed at the event. The Emma Kelly Theater, on Main Street in Statesboro, is named for her.
