= Harris Street (Savannah, Georgia) =

Prominent street in Savannah, Georgia

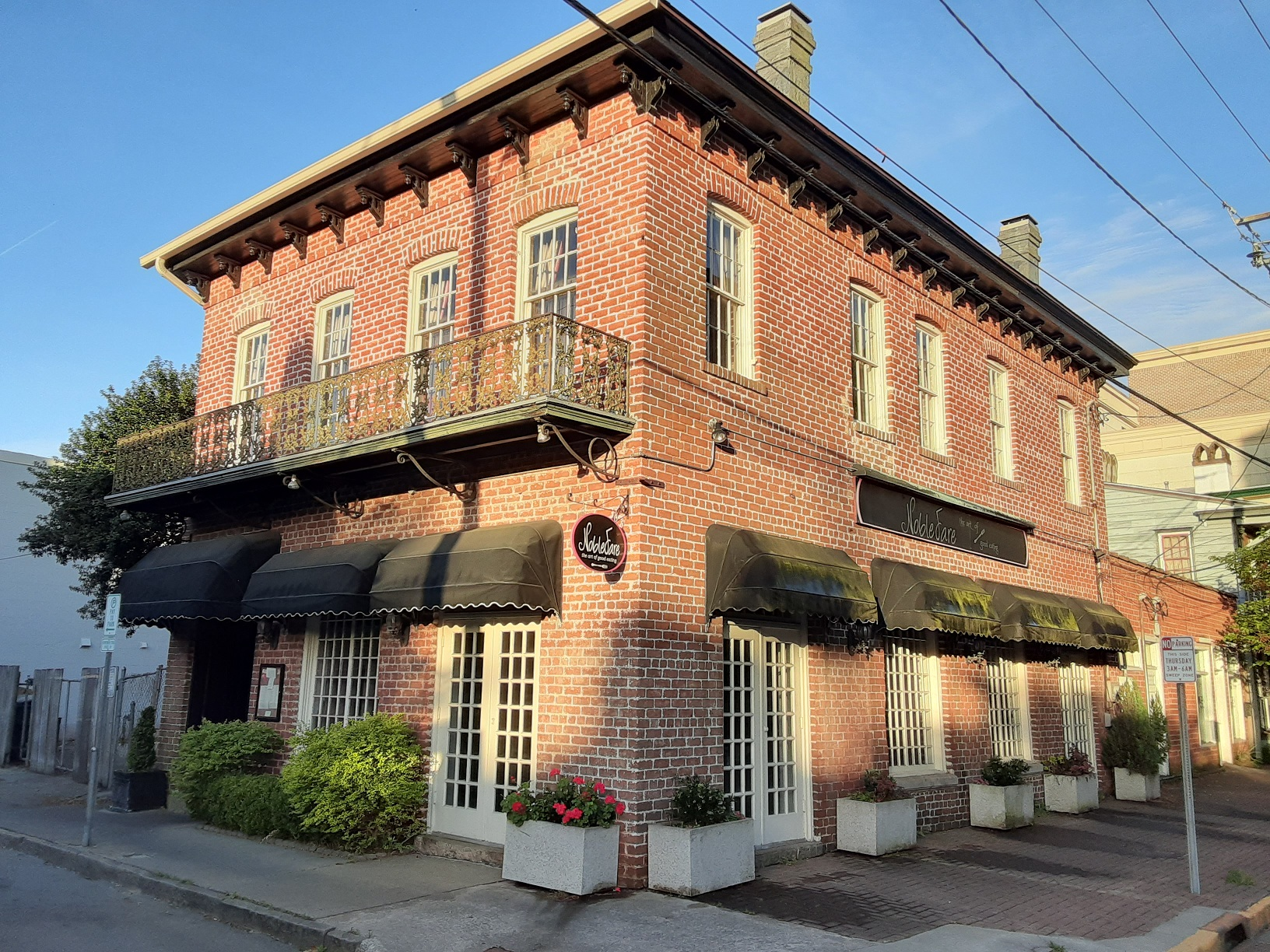
- Noble Fare, West Harris Street (2022)
- Namesake: Charles Harris
- Length: 0.86 mi (1.38 km)
- Location: Savannah, Georgia, U.S.
- West end: Purse Street
- East end: East Broad Street

Harris Street is a prominent street in Savannah, Georgia, United States. Located between Liberty Street to the north and Charlton Street to the south, it runs for about 0.86 miles (1.38 km) from Purse Street in the west to East Broad Street in the east. Originally known only as Gordon Street Harris, its addresses are now split between "West Harris Street" and "East Harris Street," the transition occurring at Bull Street in the center of the downtown area. The street is named for Charles Harris, former mayor of Savannah. The street is entirely within Savannah Historic District, a National Historic Landmark District.

Harris Street passes through four squares on their northern side. From west to east:

- Pulaski Square
- Madison Square
- Lafayette Square
- Troup Square

== Notable buildings and structures ==
Below is a selection of notable buildings and structures on Harris Street, all in Savannah's Historic District. From west to east:

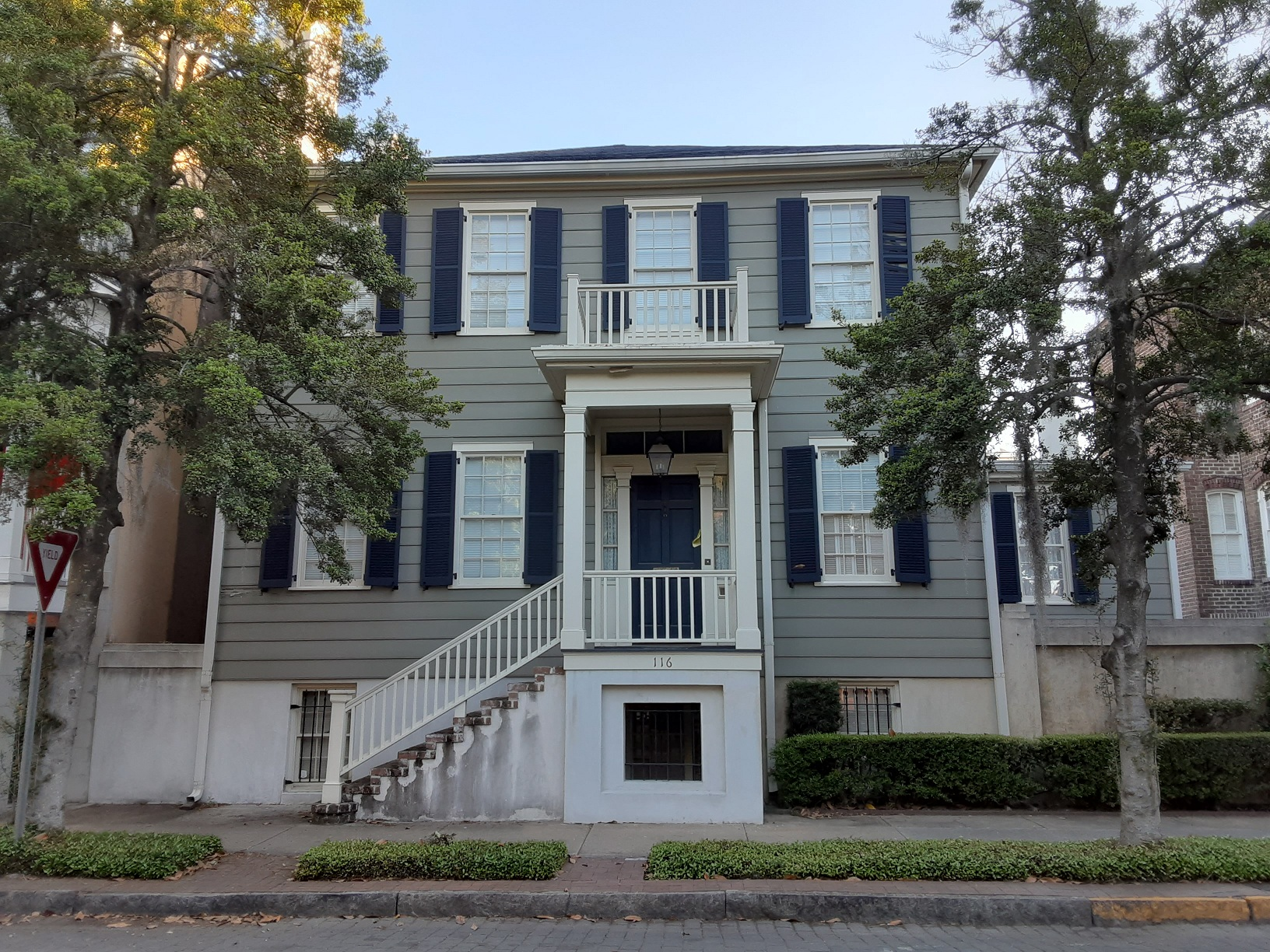
David Turner Property, 116 West Harris Street

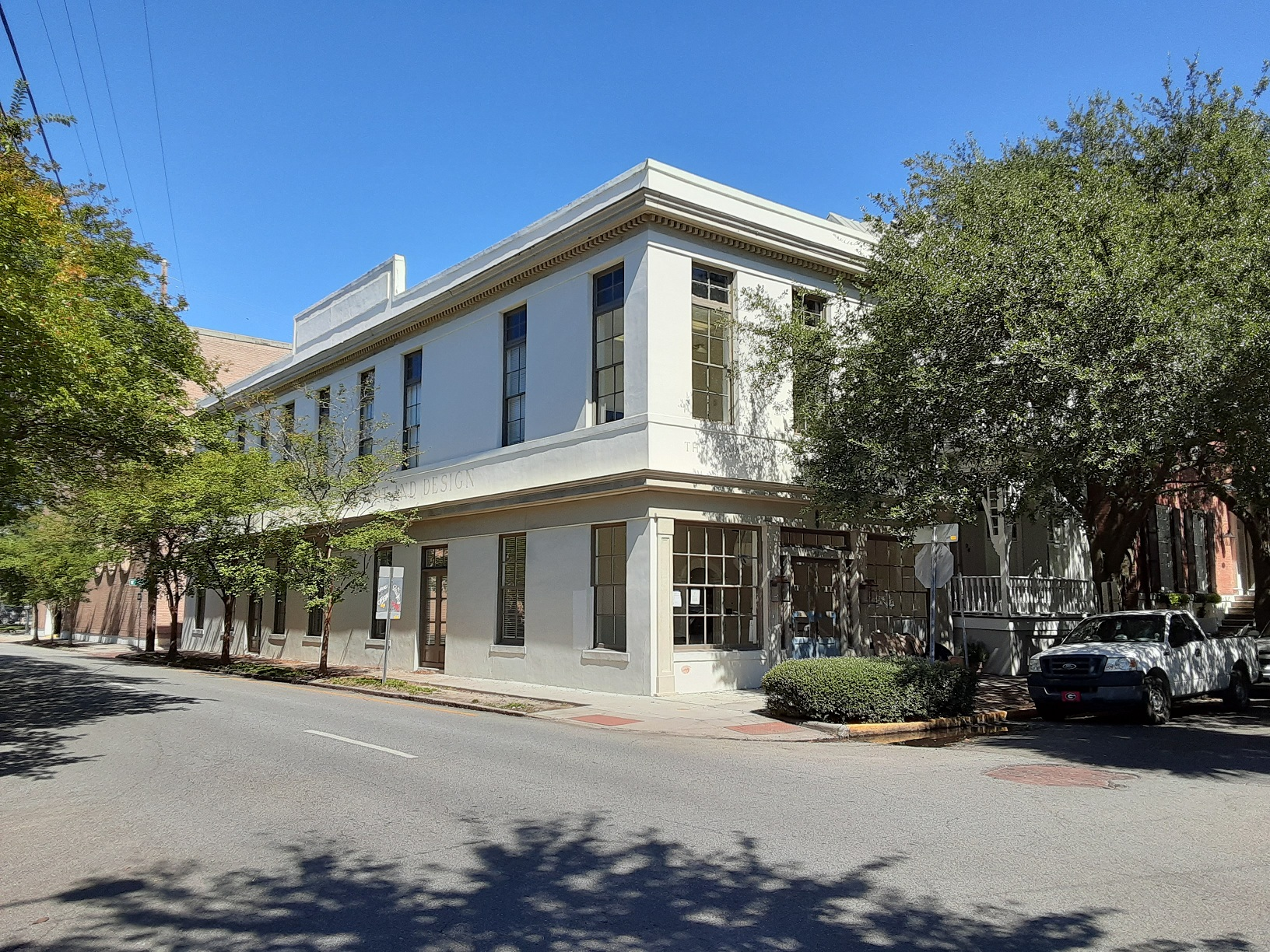
John Gallie Property, 26 West Harris Street, formerly the Savannah College of Art and Design's Harris Hall

West Harris Street

- Sarah Mell Property, 311 West Harris Street (1883)
- William Mell Property, 309 West Harris Street (1847)
- William McCullough Property, 301–303 West Harris Street (1895)
- Bernard Constantine Property, 218 West Harris Street (1839)
- Isaac LaRoche Duplex, 212–214 West Harris Street (1868)
- Georgia LaRoche Duplex, 208–210 West Harris Street (1855 and 1848)
- Theodosius Bartow House, 126 West Harris Street (1839) – the third home of Joe Odom
- John Gammel Duplex, 118–120 West Harris Street (1884)
- David Turner Property, 116 West Harris Street (1846)
- Battersby Tenements, 108–110 West Harris Street (1871)
- 106 West Harris Street (1847)
- John Gallie Property, 26 West Harris Street (1840)
- Eliza Ann Jewett Property, 20–22 West Harris Street (1843)
- Eugenia and Louisa Kerr Duplex, 14–18 West Harris Street (1843)
- Francis Sorrel Property, 12 West Harris Street (1856)
- Sorrel–Weed House, 6 West Harris Street (1841)

East Harris Street

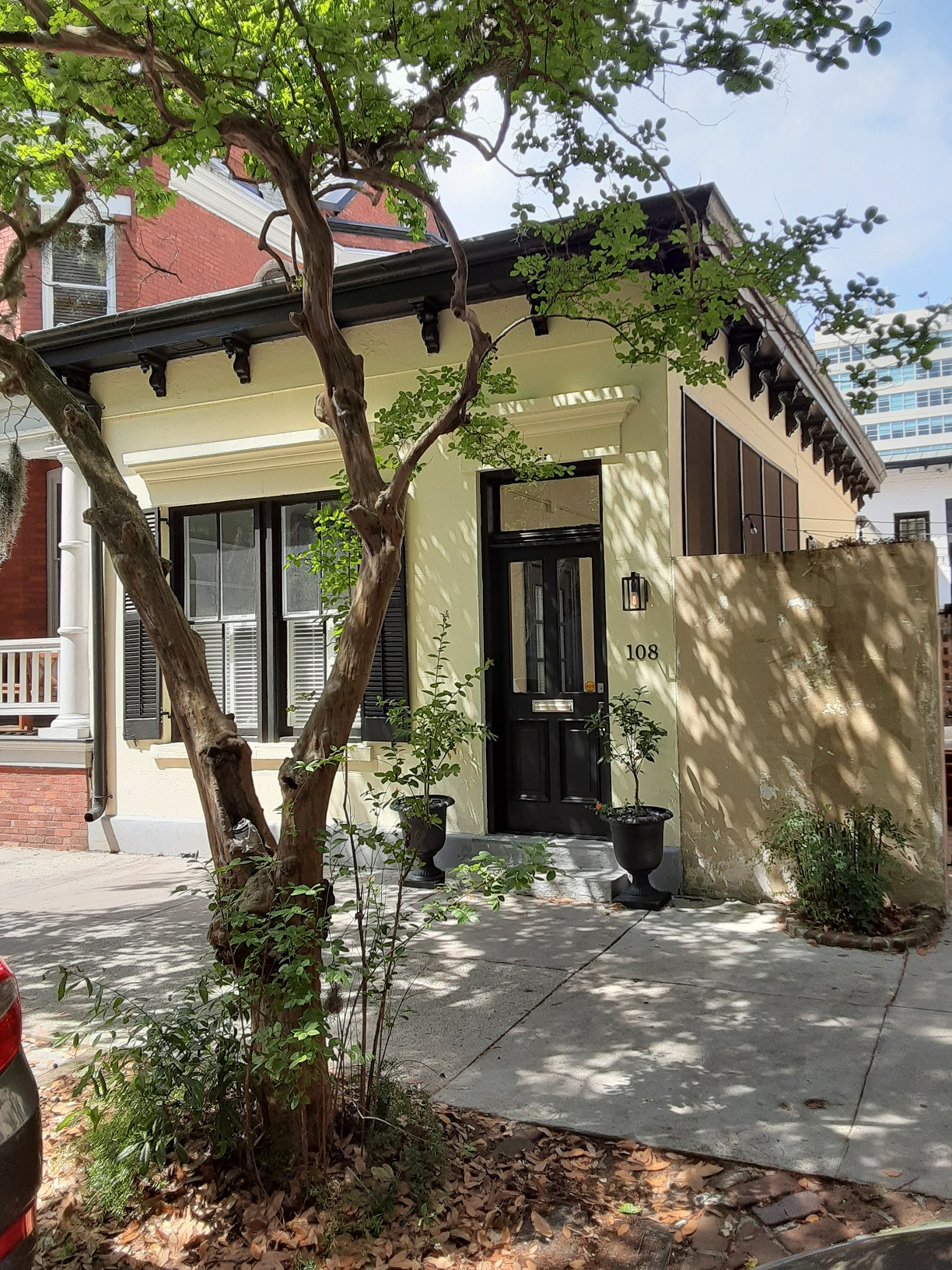
108 East Harris Street

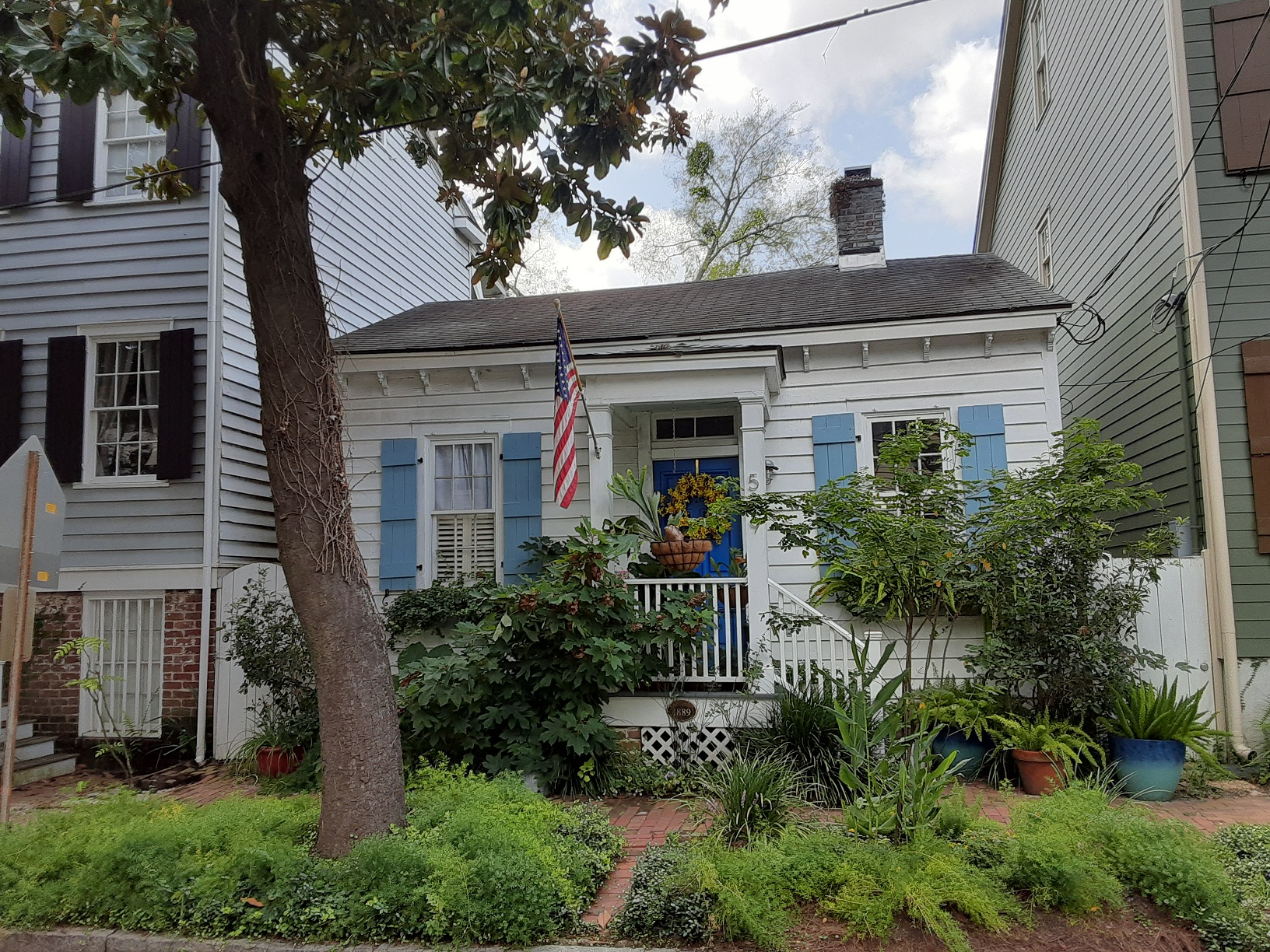
John and Estelle Savage Property, 519 East Harris Street

- 104 East Harris Street (1875)
- Centurian House, 106 East Harris Street (1903)
- 108 East Harris Street (1857)
- 118 & 124 East Harris Street (1860)
- Cathedral of St. John the Baptist, 222 East Harris Street (1876)
- Frances Threadcroaft Duplex, 301–307 East Harris Street (1868)
- Sarah Coombs Property, 309–311 East Harris Street (1863)
- Parsonage of Unitarian Universalist Church (formerly St. Stephen), 313 East Harris Street (1870)
- Unitarian Universalist Church, 321 Habersham Street (1851) – originally in Oglethorpe Square; moved to Troup Square in 1860
- John McDonough Property, 322–326 East Harris Street (1869)
- The Beach Institute/Freedman's School, 502 East Harris Street (1867)
- James Cann Property, 513–515 East Harris Street (1872)
- Anna Whitesides Duplex, 516–518 East Harris Street (1885)
- John and Estelle Savage Property (I), 519 East Harris Street (1889)
- John and Estelle Savage Property (II), 521 East Harris Street (1875)
- Joseph Gally Tenement, 523–525 East Harris Street (1867)
- Ellen Monahan Property, 524–526 East Harris Street (1885)
- Noble Hardee Tenement (I), 543–545 East Harris Street (1861)
- Noble Hardee Tenement (II), 549–551 East Harris Street (1861)
- Noble Hardee Tenement (III), 555–557 East Harris Street (1863)
