= Pulaski Square =

Public square in Savannah, Georgia

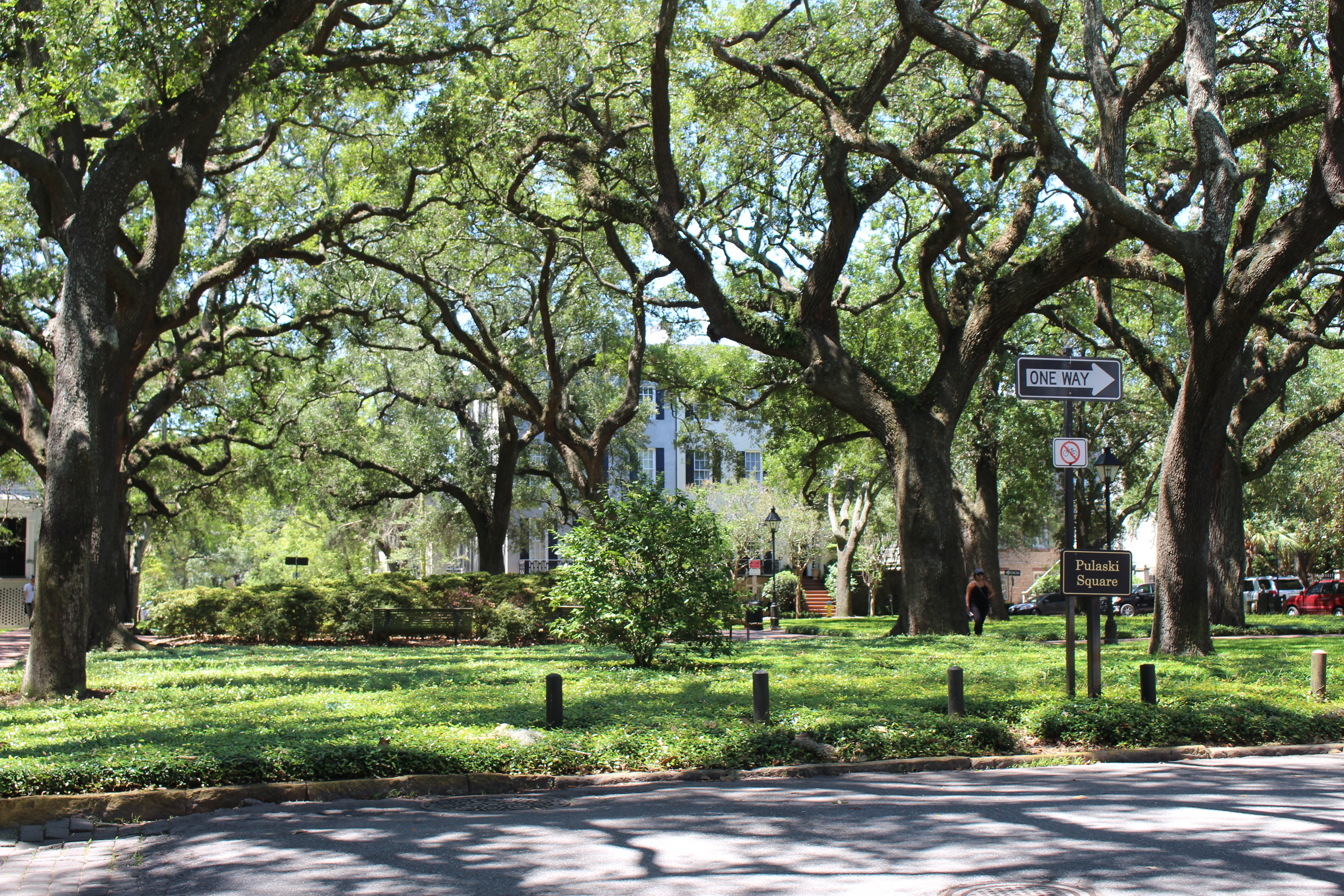
- The square in 2017
- Interactive map of Pulaski Square
- Namesake: Casimir Pulaski
- Maintained by: City of Savannah
- Location: Savannah, Georgia, U.S.
- Coordinates: 32.0741°N 81.0962°W
- North: Barnard Street
- East: West Macon Street
- South: Barnard Street
- West: West Macon Street

Construction
- Completion: 1837 (189 years ago)

Pulaski Square is one of the 22 squares of Savannah, Georgia, United States. It is located in the fourth row of the city's five rows of squares, on Barnard Street and West Macon Street, and was laid out in 1837. It is south of Orleans Square, west of Madison Square and north of Chatham Square. It is known for its live oaks. The oldest buildings on the square are the Theodosius Bartow House (126 West Harris Street) and the Bernard Constantine House (218 West Harris Street), which date to 1839.

The square is named for General Casimir Pulaski, a Polish-born Revolutionary War hero who died of wounds received in the siege of Savannah (1779). It is one of the few squares without a monument; General Pulaski's statue (and, likely, his remains) is in nearby Monterey Square.

Prior to the birth of the historical preservation movement and the restoration of much of Savannah's downtown, Pulaski Square sheltered a sizeable homeless population and was one of several squares that had been paved to allow traffic to drive straight through its center.

The square is one of the few to have a parking lot occupy one of its blocks (in this case the northeastern trust lot).

== Dedication ==
Namesake	Image	Note
Casimir Pulaski		The square is named for Polish nobleman General Casimir Pulaski (1745–1779). His monument stands in Monterey Square.

== Constituent buildings ==
Each building below is in one of the eight blocks around the square composed of four residential "tything" blocks and four civic ("trust") blocks, now known as the Oglethorpe Plan. They are listed with construction years where known.

Northwestern residential/tything lot

- Georgia LaRoche Duplex, 208 West Harris Street (1855)
- Georgia LaRoche Duplex, 210 West Harris Street (1848)
- Isaac LaRoche Duplex, 212–214 West Harris Street (1868)
- Bernard Constantine House, 218 West Harris Street (1839) – joint-oldest building on the square

Northwestern civic/trust lot

- Bernard Constantine Property (1), 321 Barnard Street (1845)

Southwestern civic/trust lot

- 331 Barnard Street (1844)

Southwestern residential/tything lot

- Celia Solomons Duplex, 201–203 West Charlton Street (1854–1856)
- Moses Cohen House, 215 West Charlton Street (1846)

Northeastern residential/tything lot

- Theodosius Bartow House, 126 West Harris Street (1839) – third storey added later; joint-oldest building on the square
- John Gammel Duplex, 118–120 West Harris Street (1884)
- David Turner Property, 116 West Harris Street (1846)
- The Battersby Tenements, 108–110 West Harris Street (1871)
- 106 West Harris Street (1847)

Southeastern civic/trust lot

- JEA Building, 328 Barnard Street (1914) – also known as Pulaski House

Southeastern residential/tything lot

- William Adams House, 123 West Charlton Street (1843) – third storey added later
- George Walker House, 117 West Charlton Street (1904)
- Hill Gordy House, 111 West Charlton Street (1864–1865) – street façade blocked up in 1965
- 109 West Charlton Street (1915)

== Gallery ==
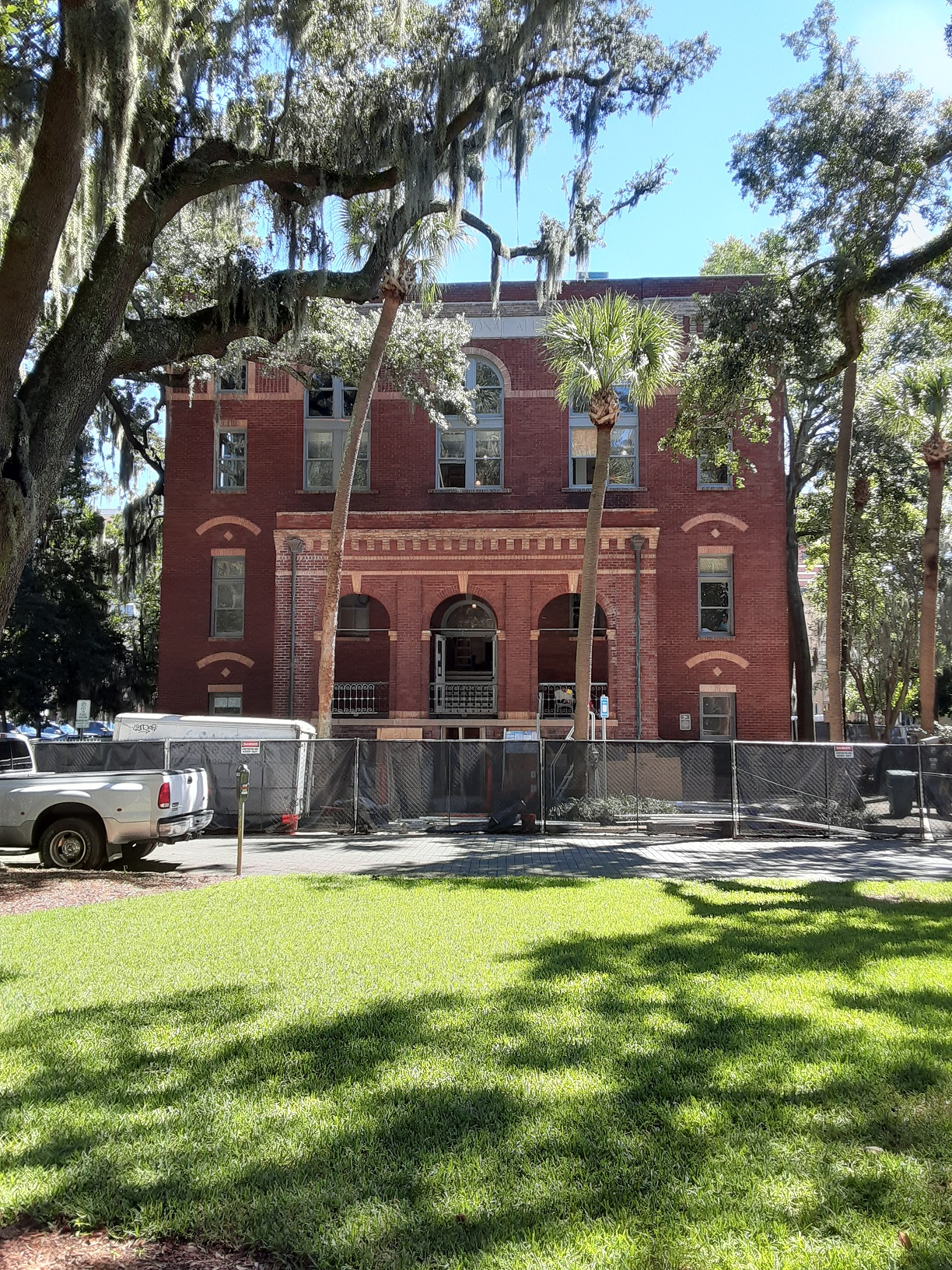
JEA Building, 328 Barnard Street

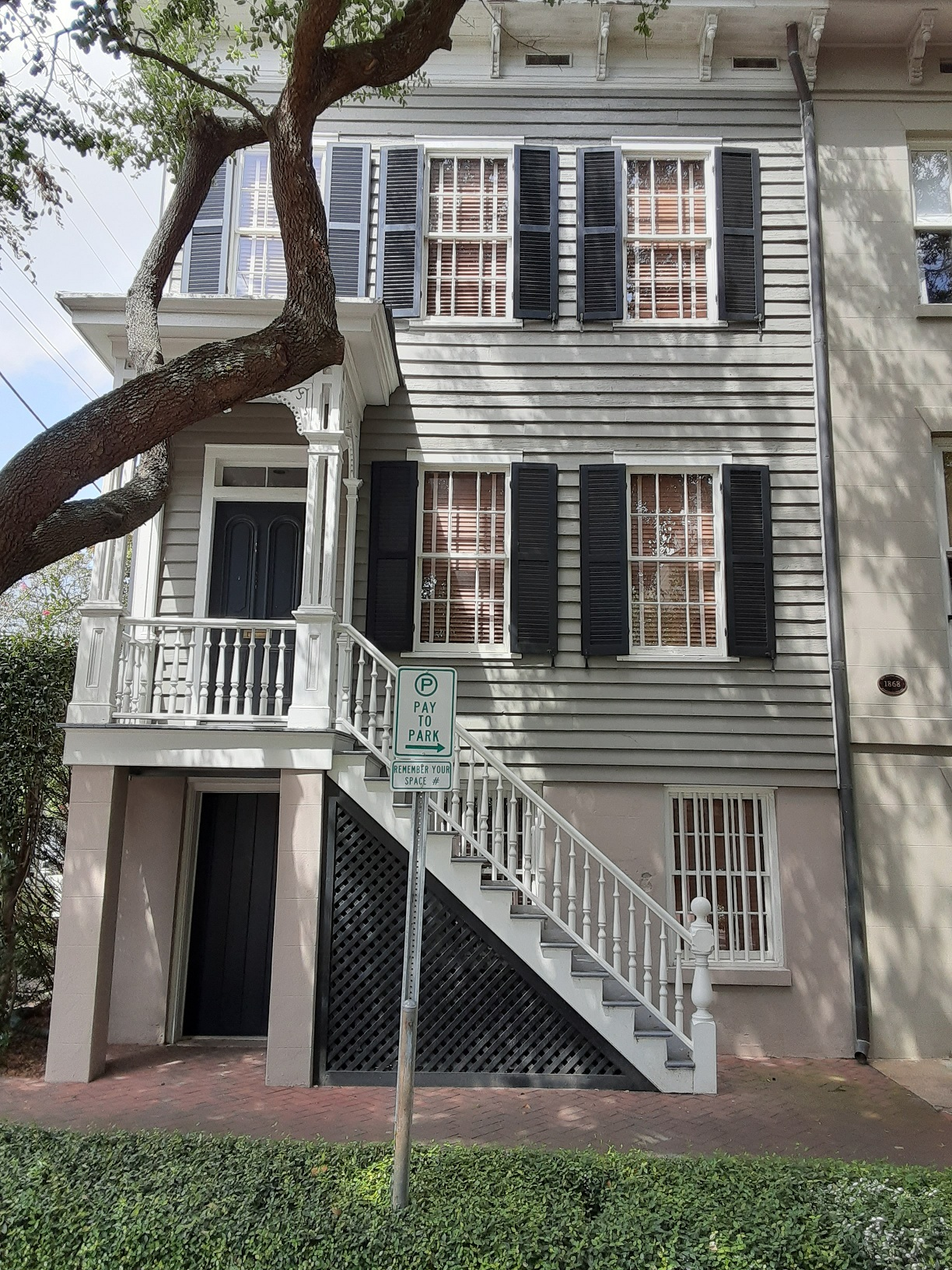
Bernard Constantine House, 218 West Harris Street

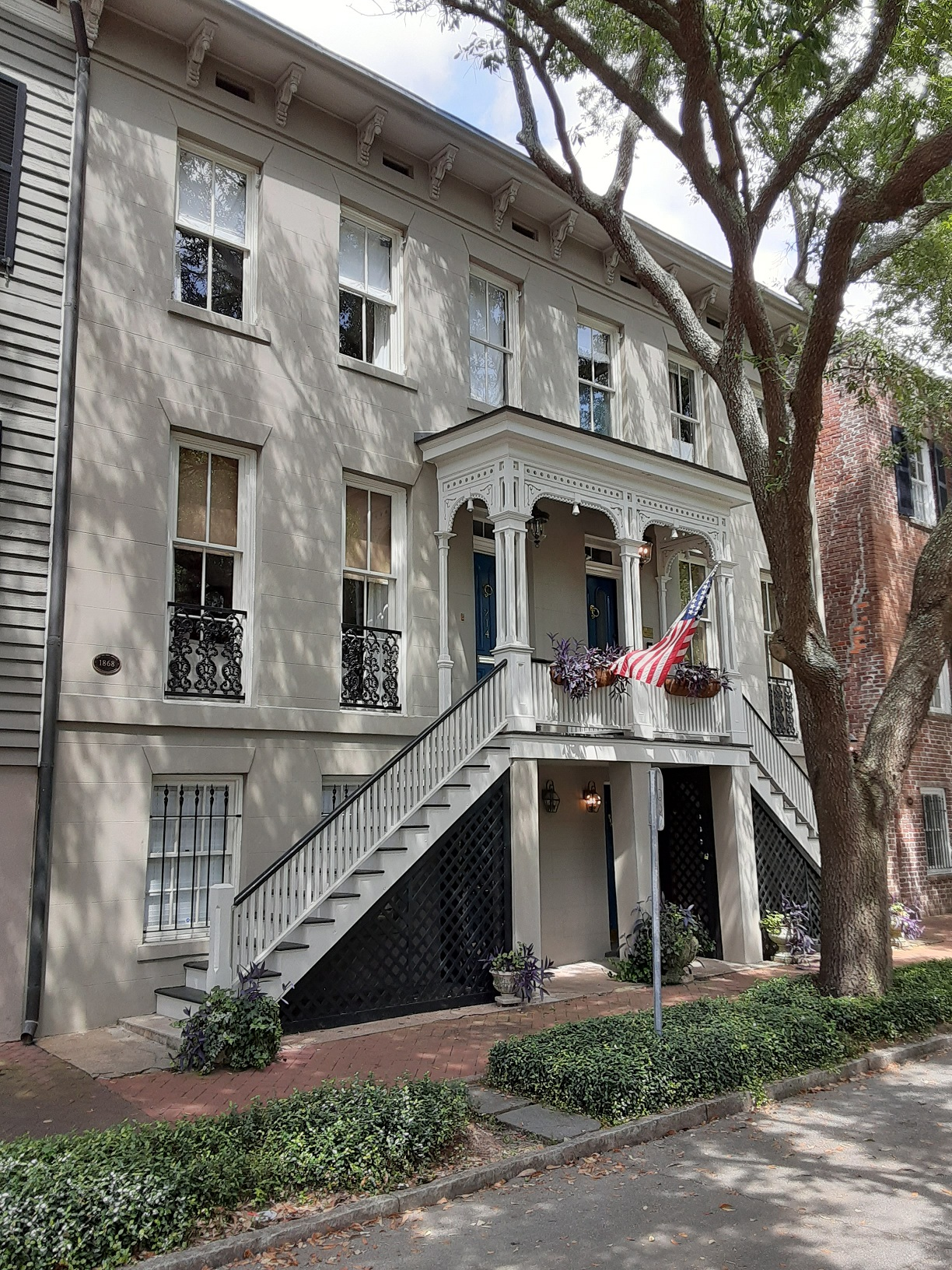
Isaac LaRoche Duplex, 212-214 West Harris Street

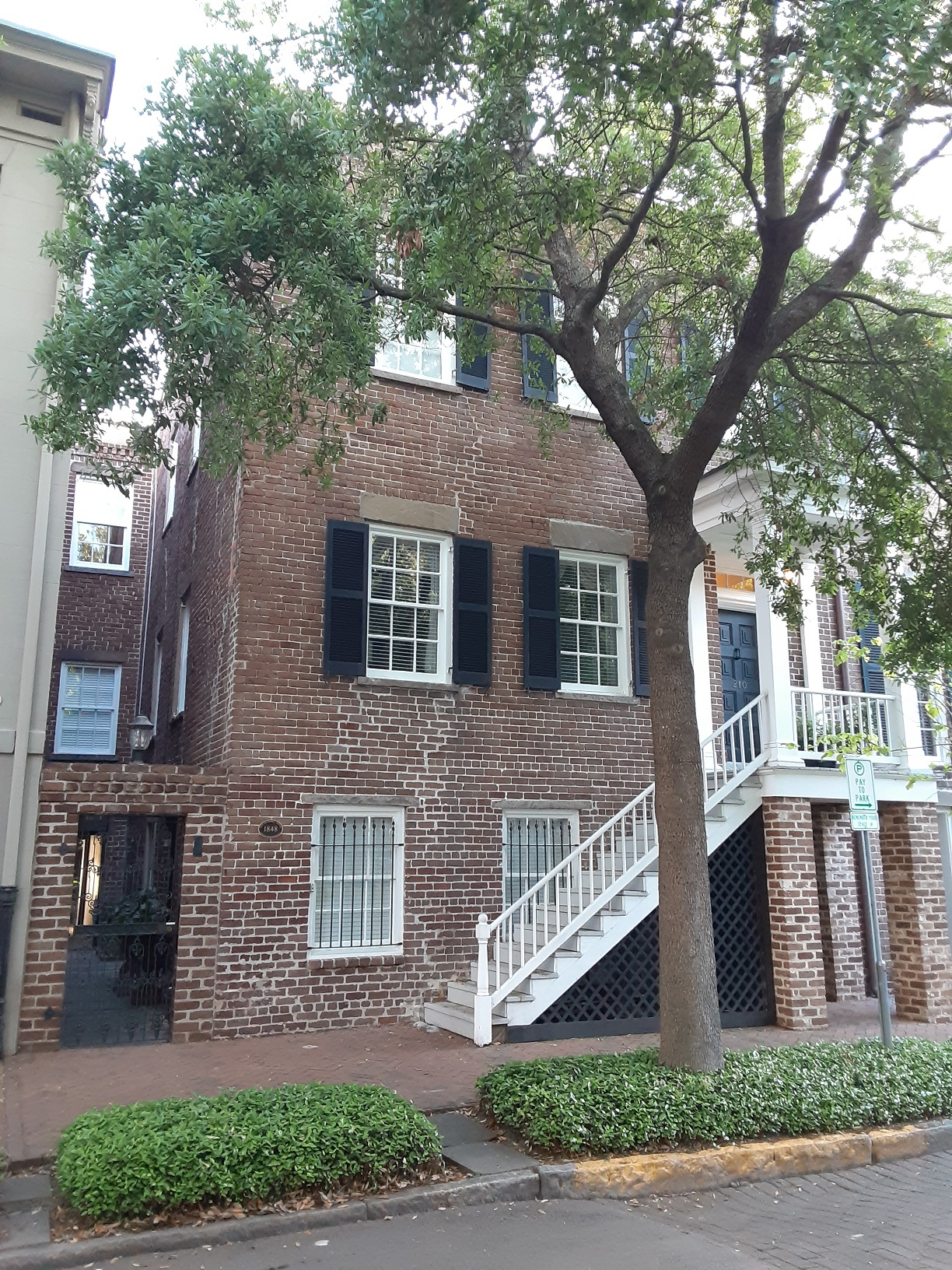
Georgia LaRoche Duplex (western portion), 210 West Harris Street

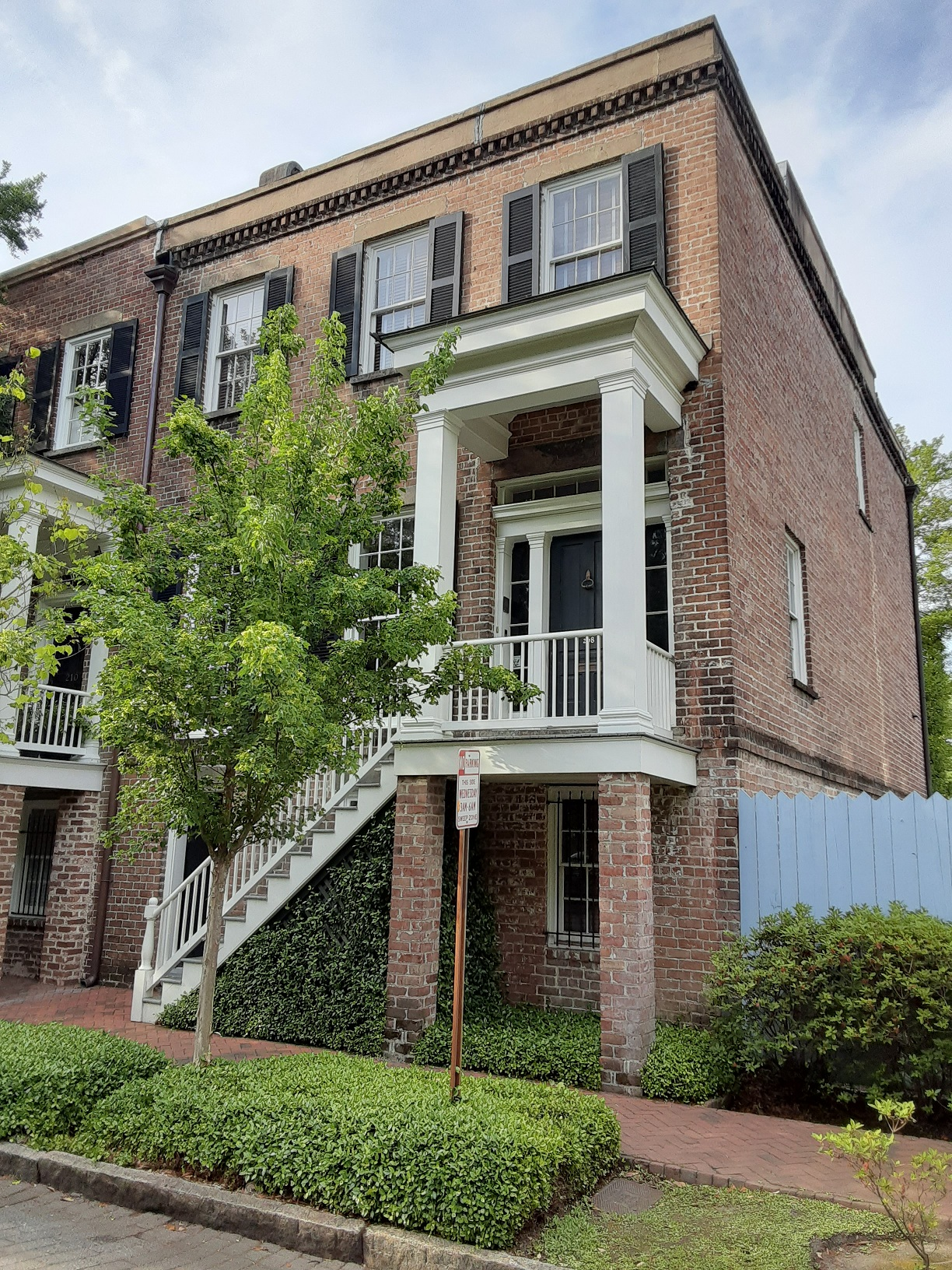
Georgia LaRoche Duplex (eastern portion), 208 West Harris Street

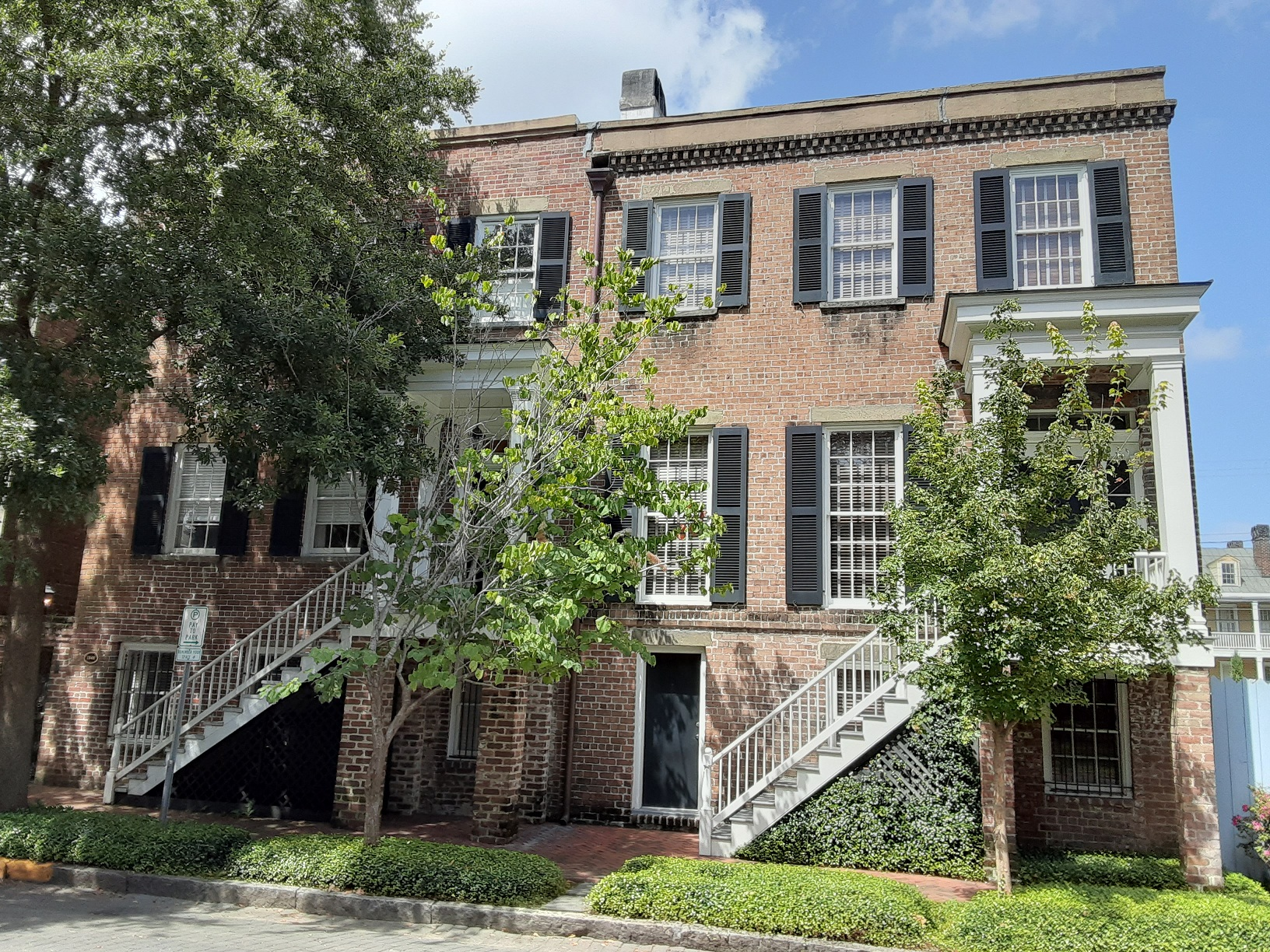
Georgia LaRoche Duplex, 208–210 West Harris Street

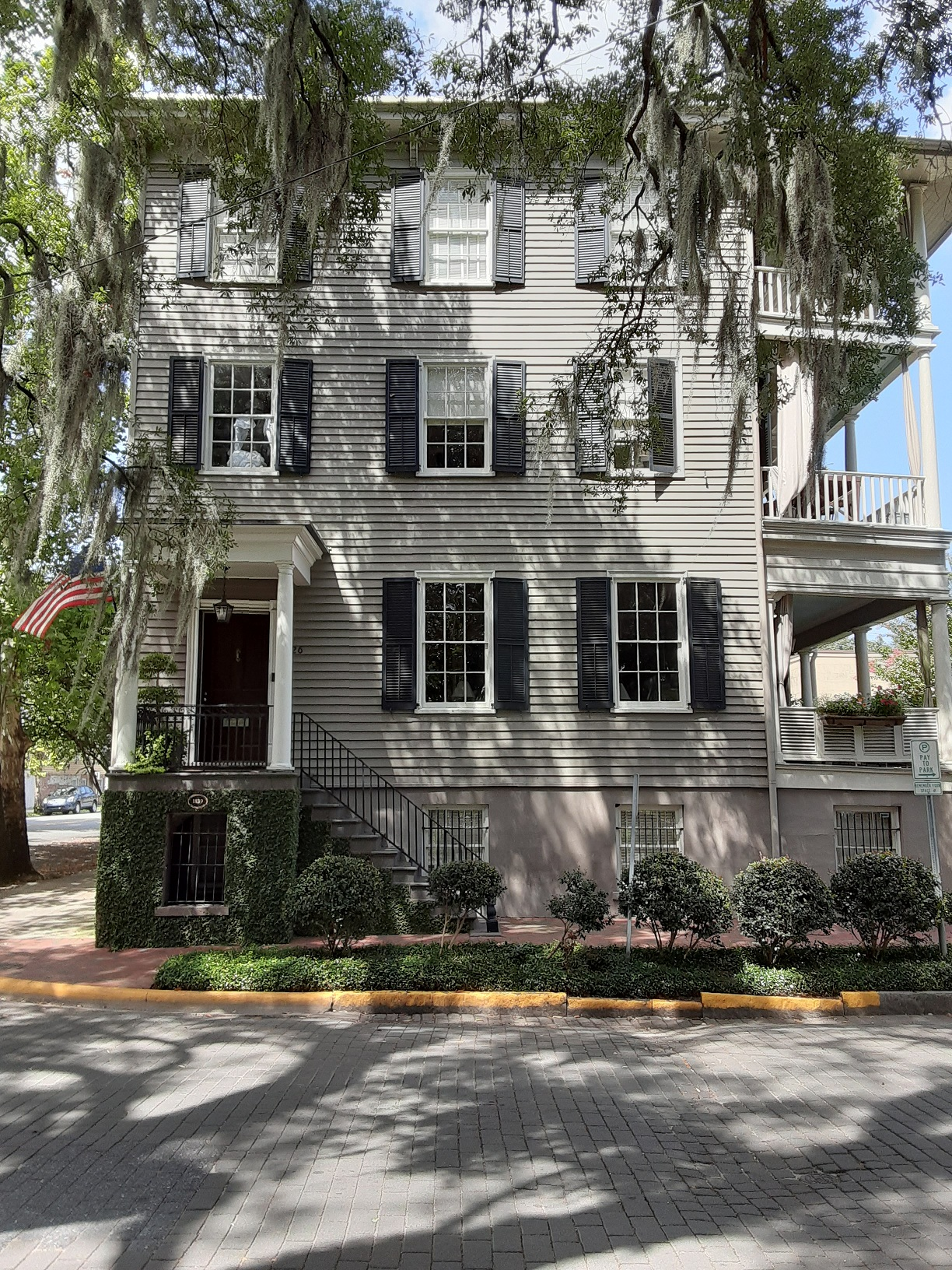
Theodosius Bartow House, 126 West Harris Street

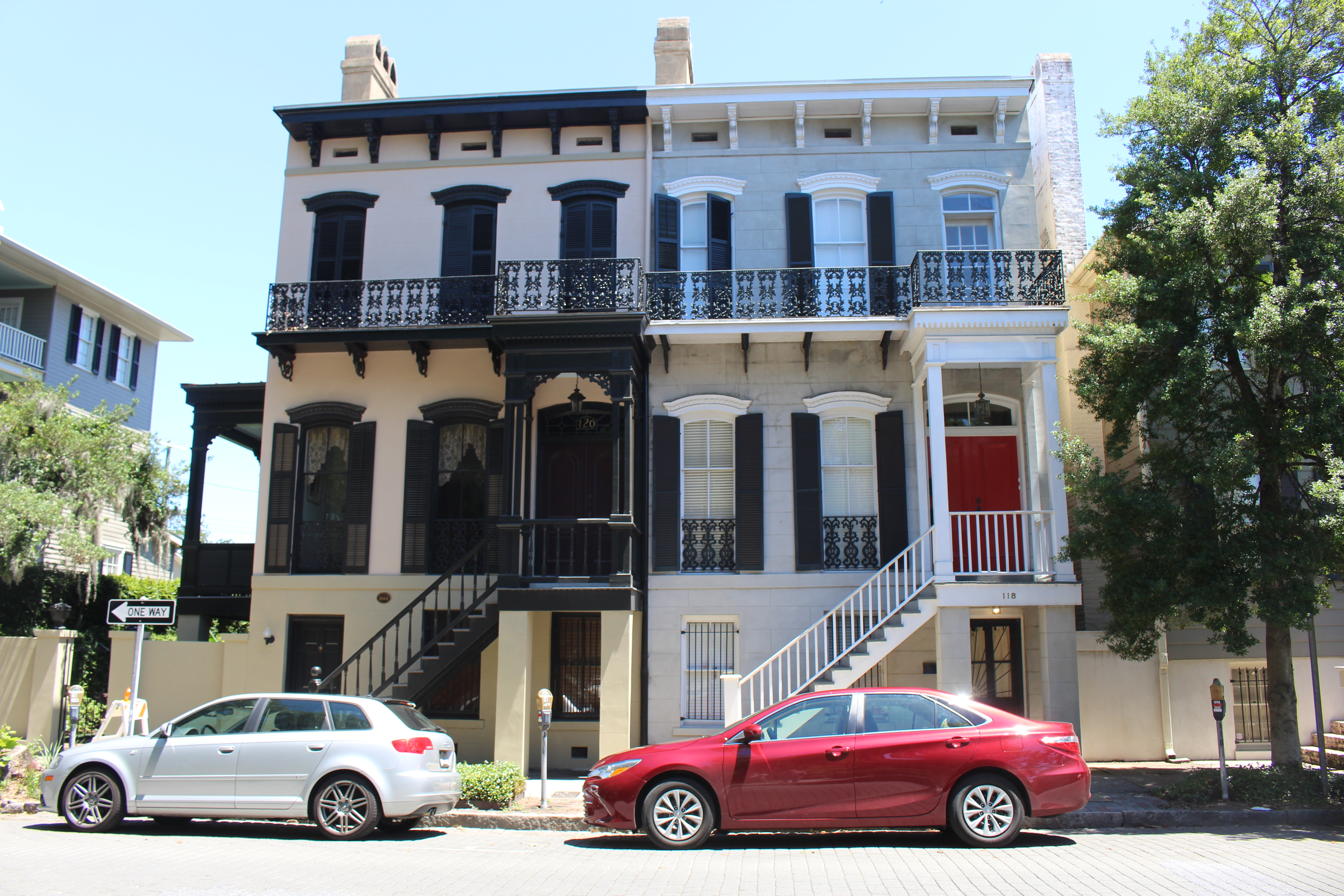
John Gammel Duplex, 118–120 West Harris Street

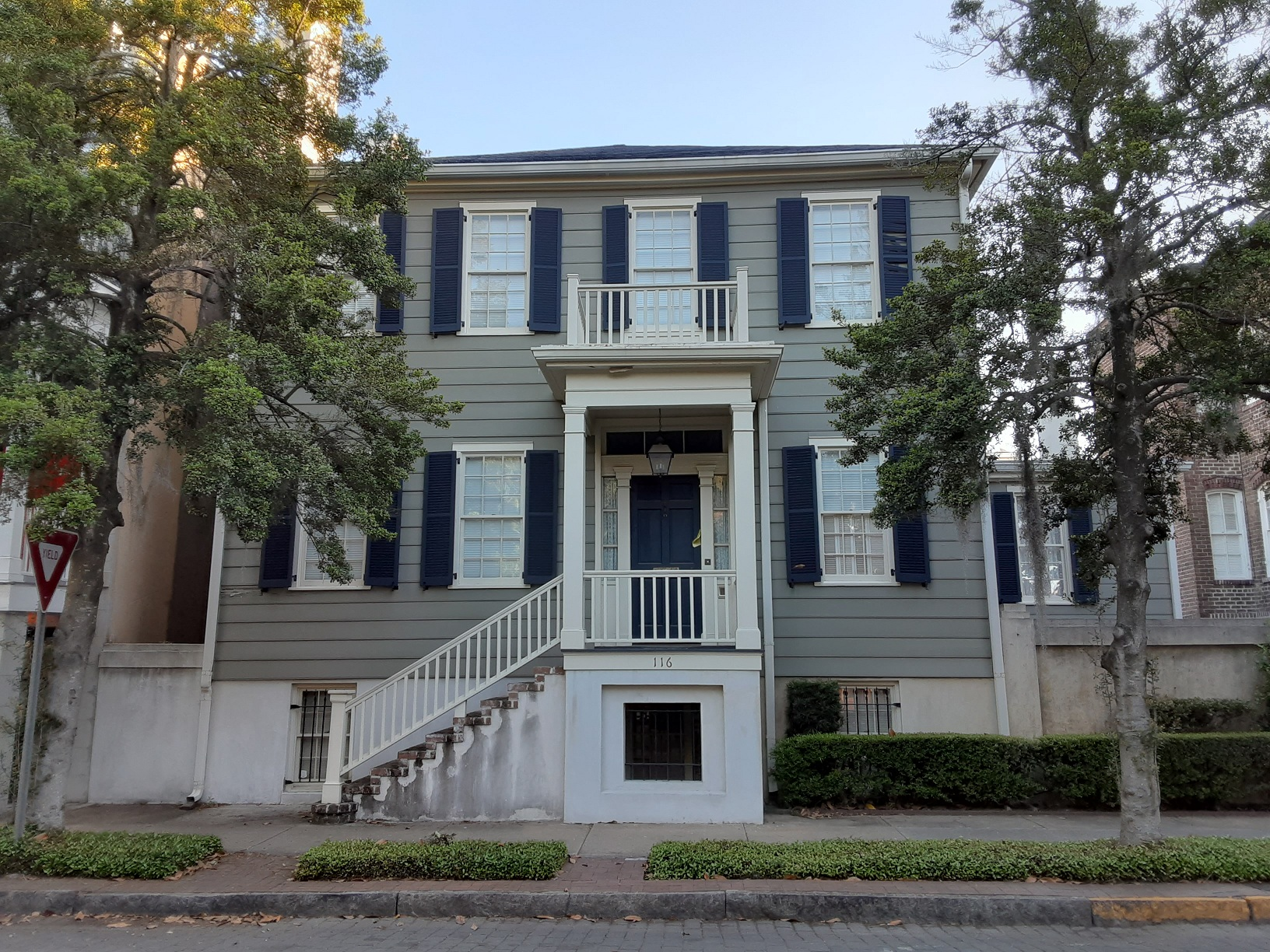
David Turner Property, 116 West Harris Street

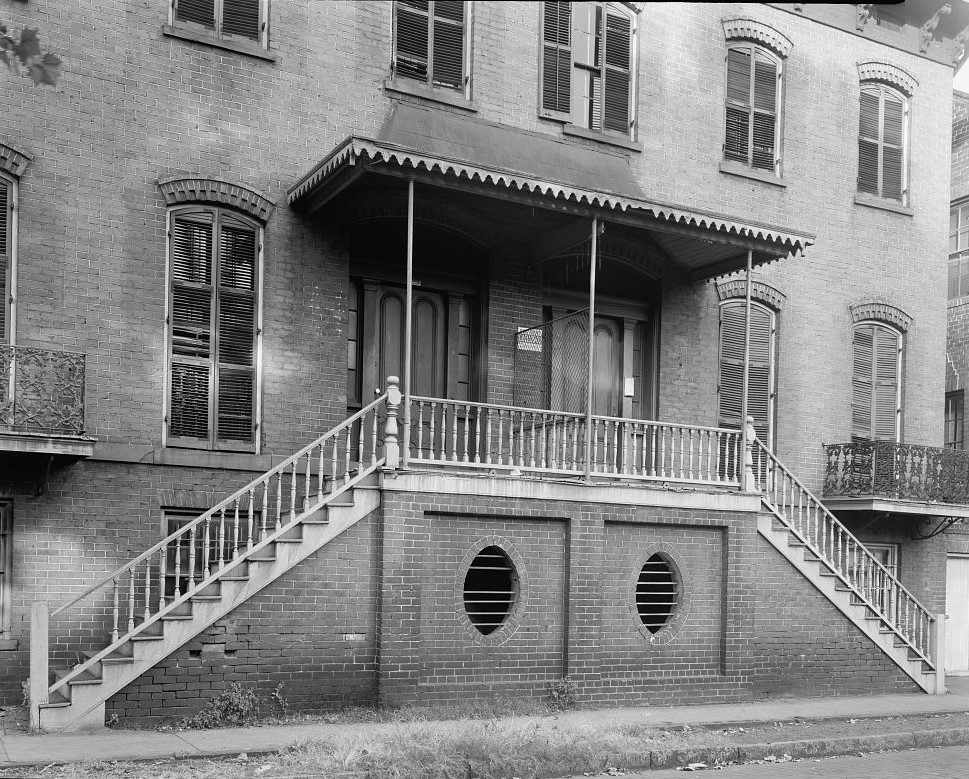
The Battersby Tenements, 108–110 West Harris Street

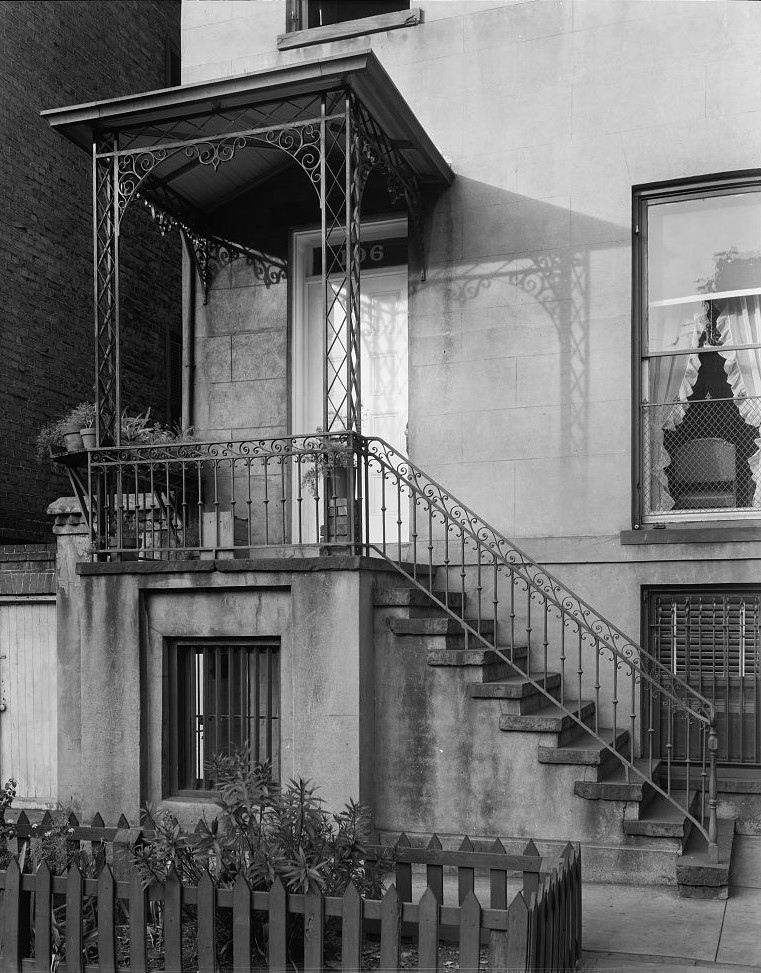
106 West Harris Street

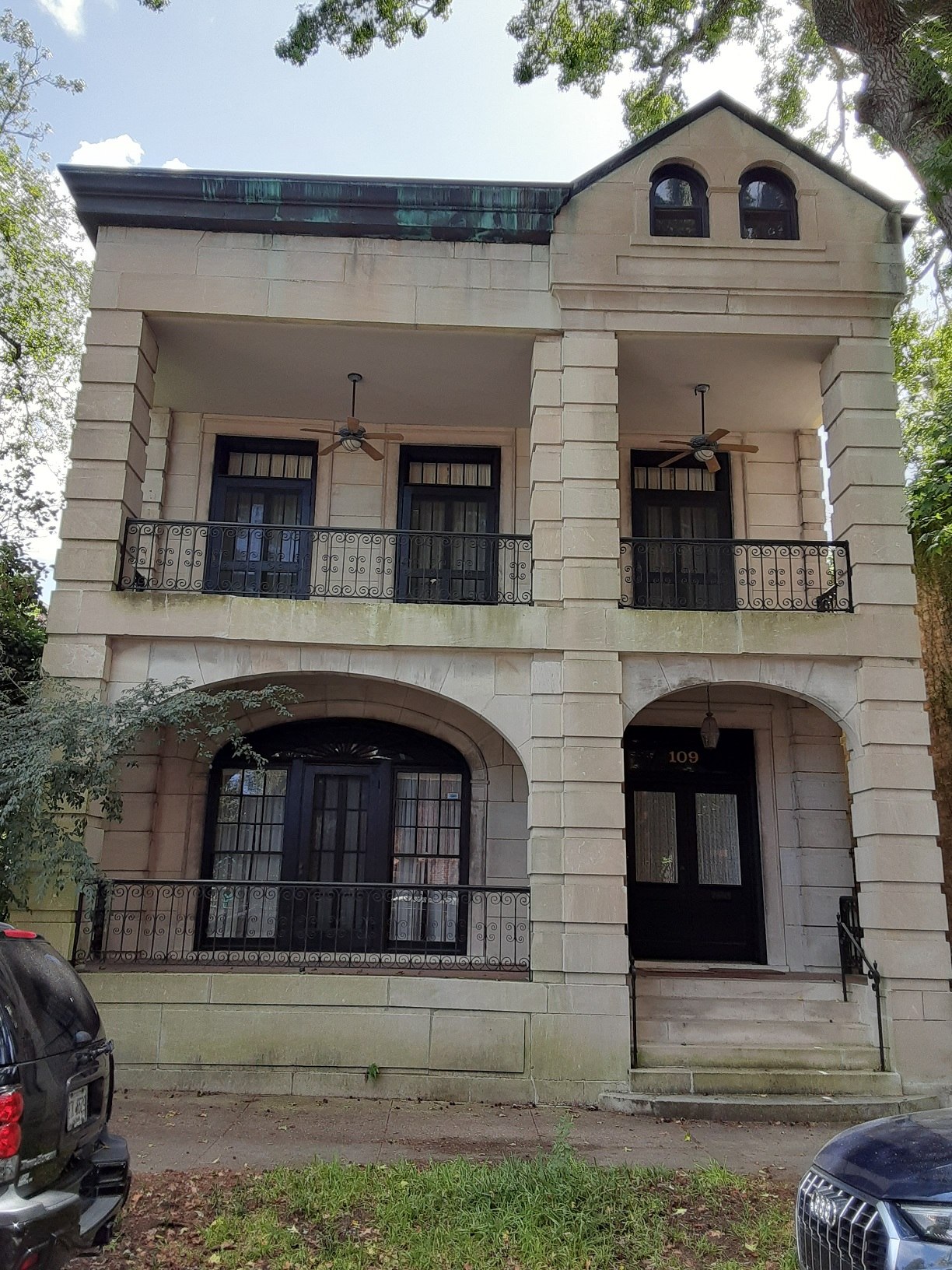
109 West Charlton Street

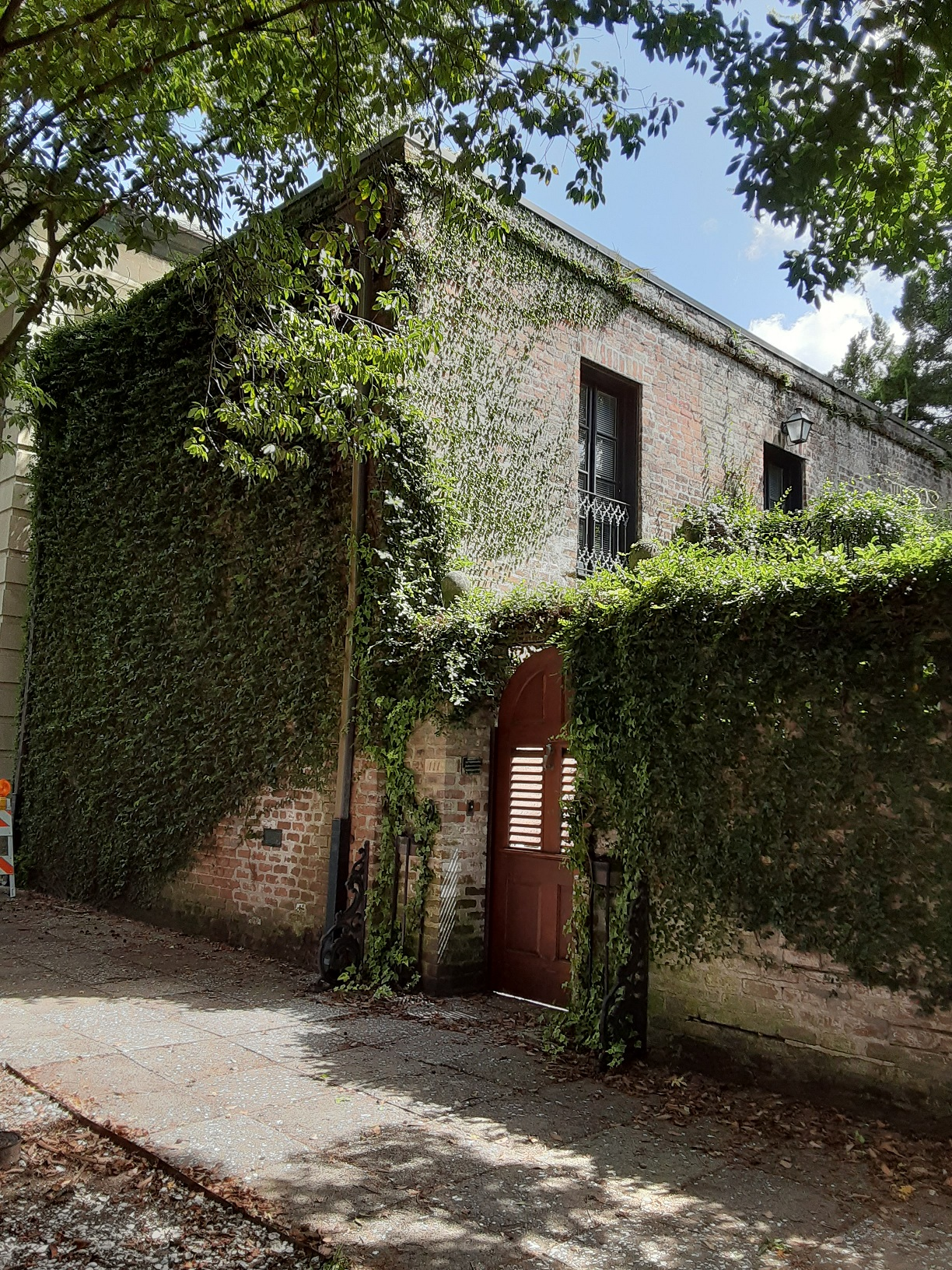
Hill Gordy House, 111 West Charlton Street

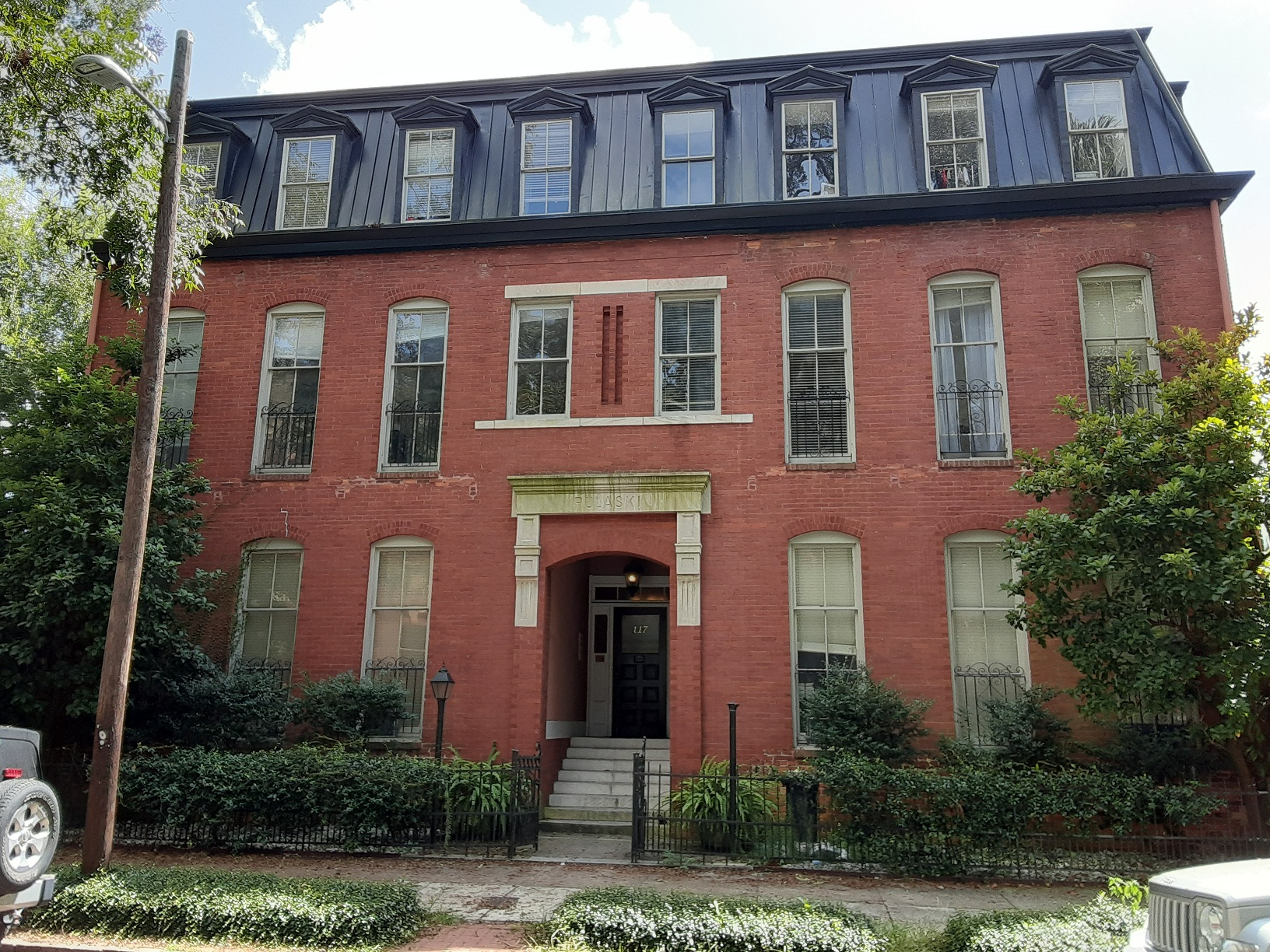
George Walker House, 117 West Charlton Street

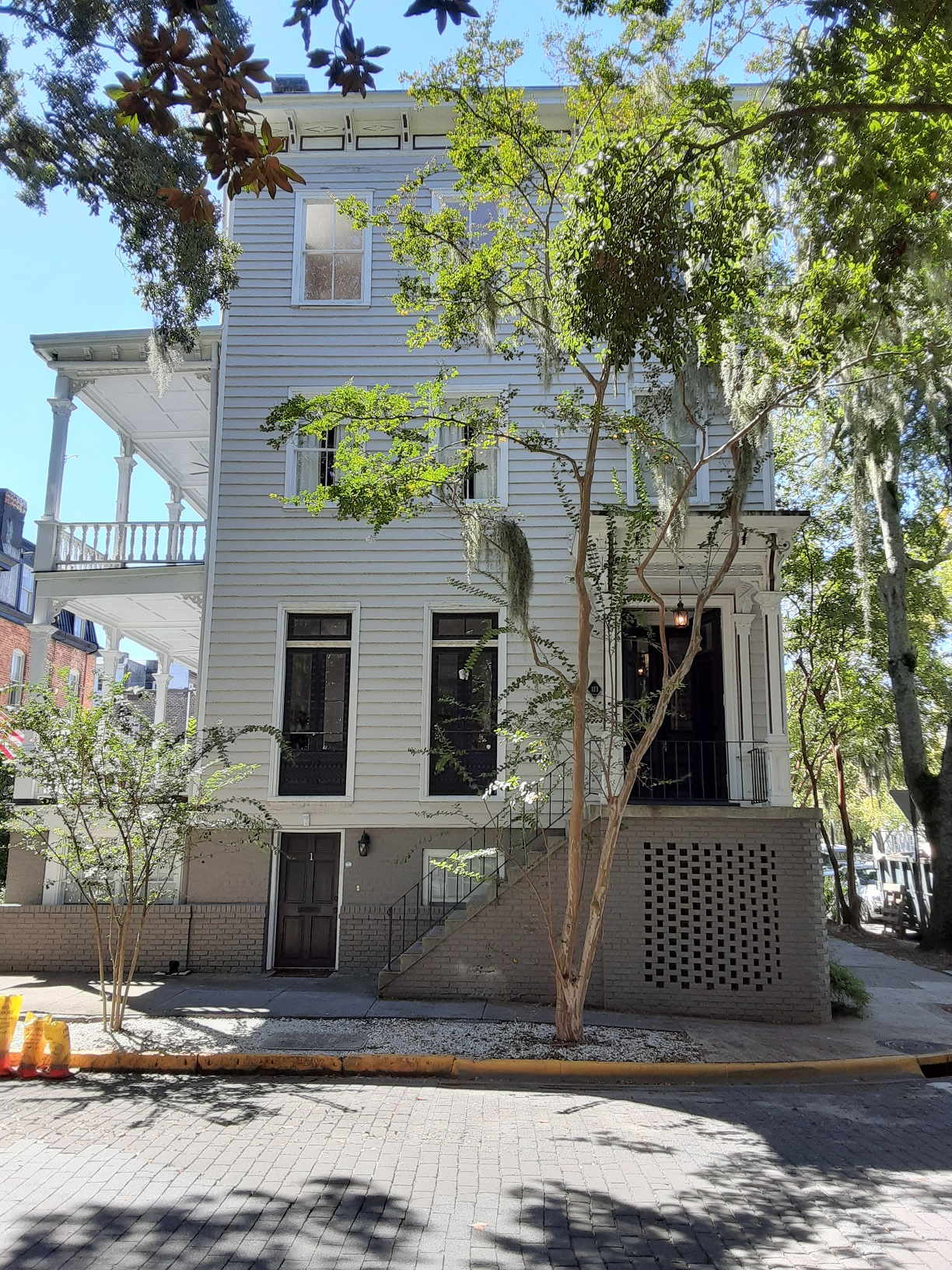
William Adams House, 123 West Charlton Street

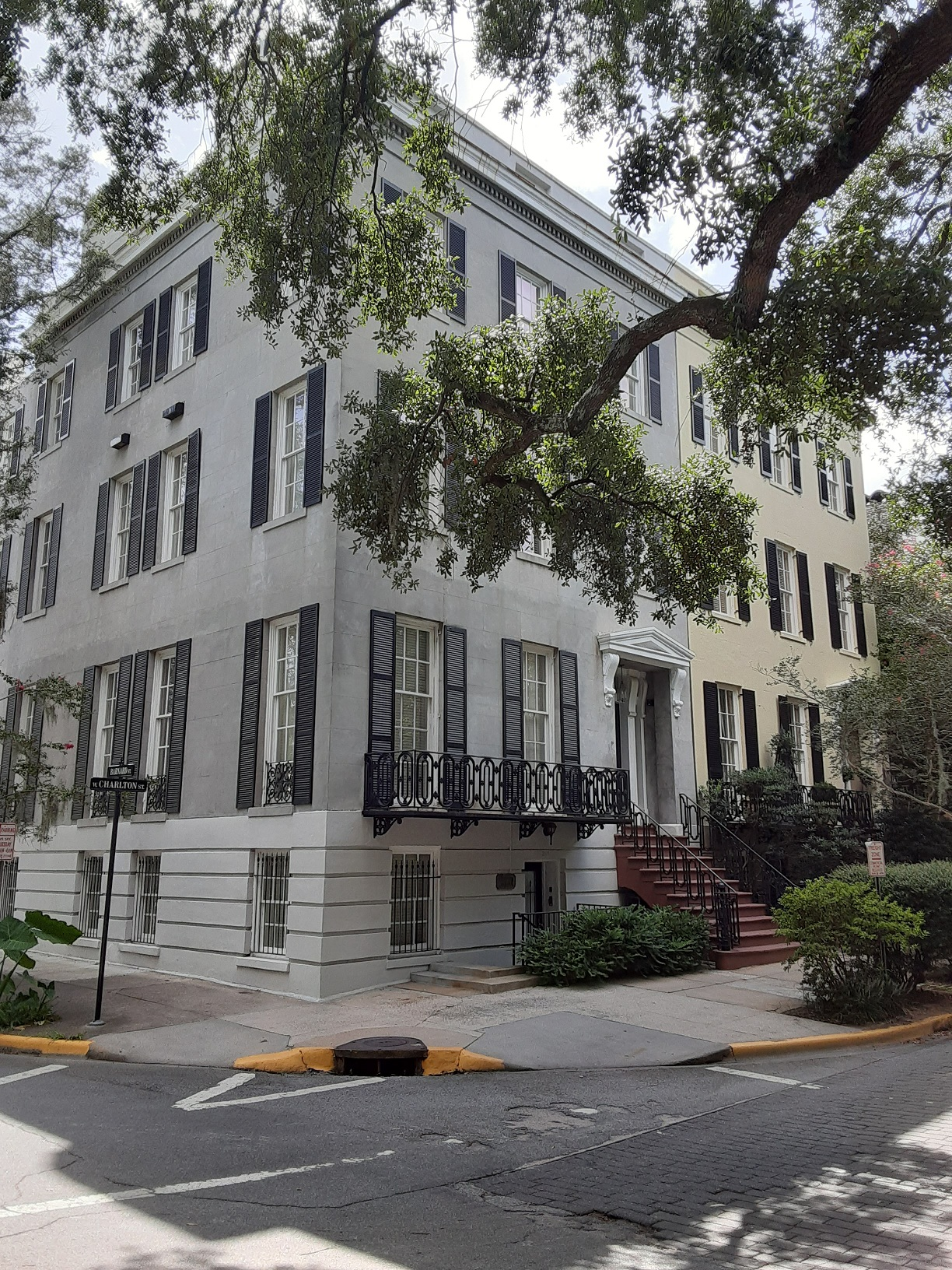
Celia Solomons Duplex, 201–203 West Charlton Street

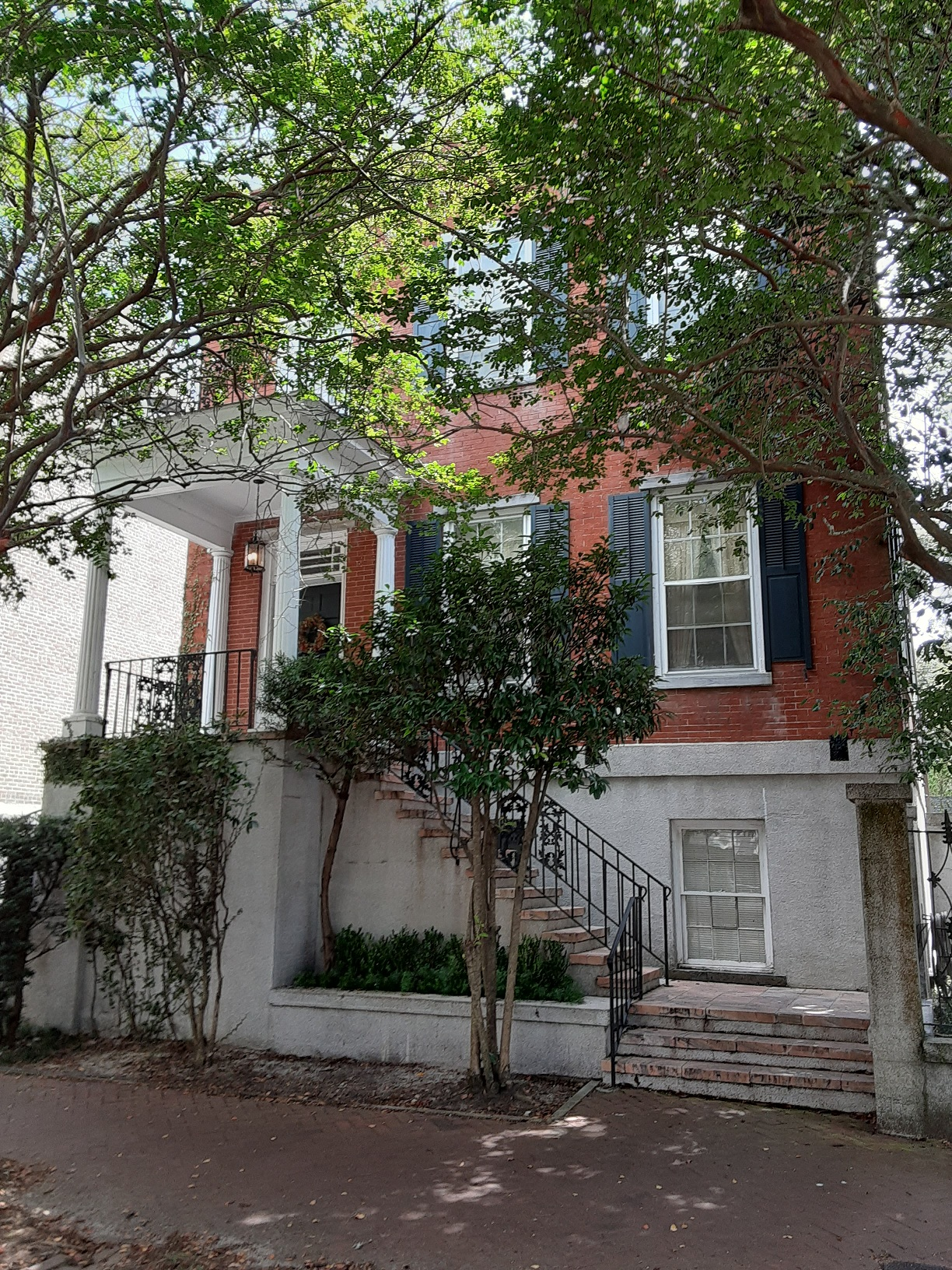
Moses Cohen House, 215 West Charlton Street, built by John Sturdevant

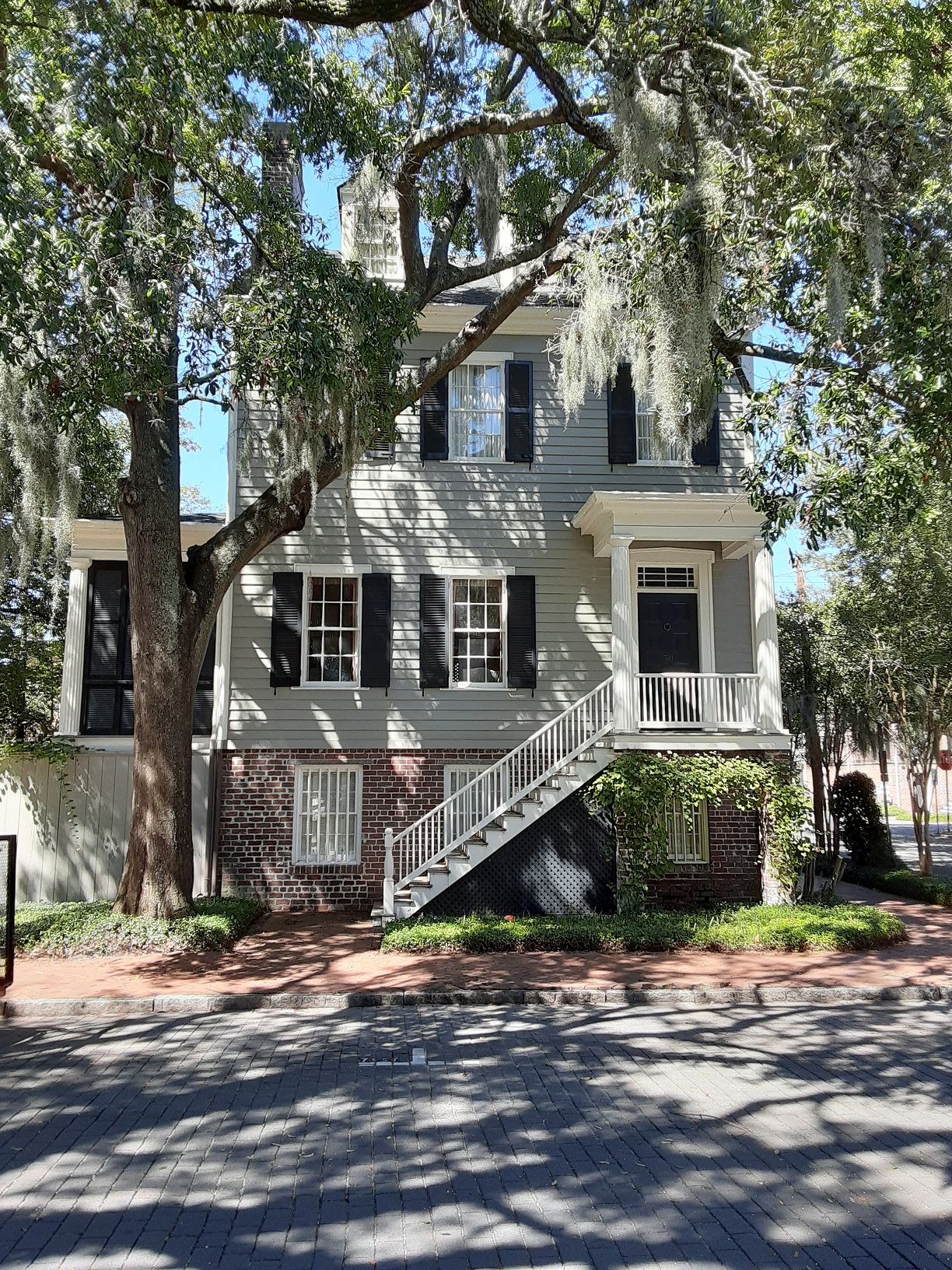
Bernard Constantine Property (1), 321 Barnard Street
