= List of historic houses and buildings in Savannah, Georgia =

This is a list of historic houses and buildings in Savannah, Georgia, that have their own articles or are on the National Register of Historic Places (NRHP).

Houses

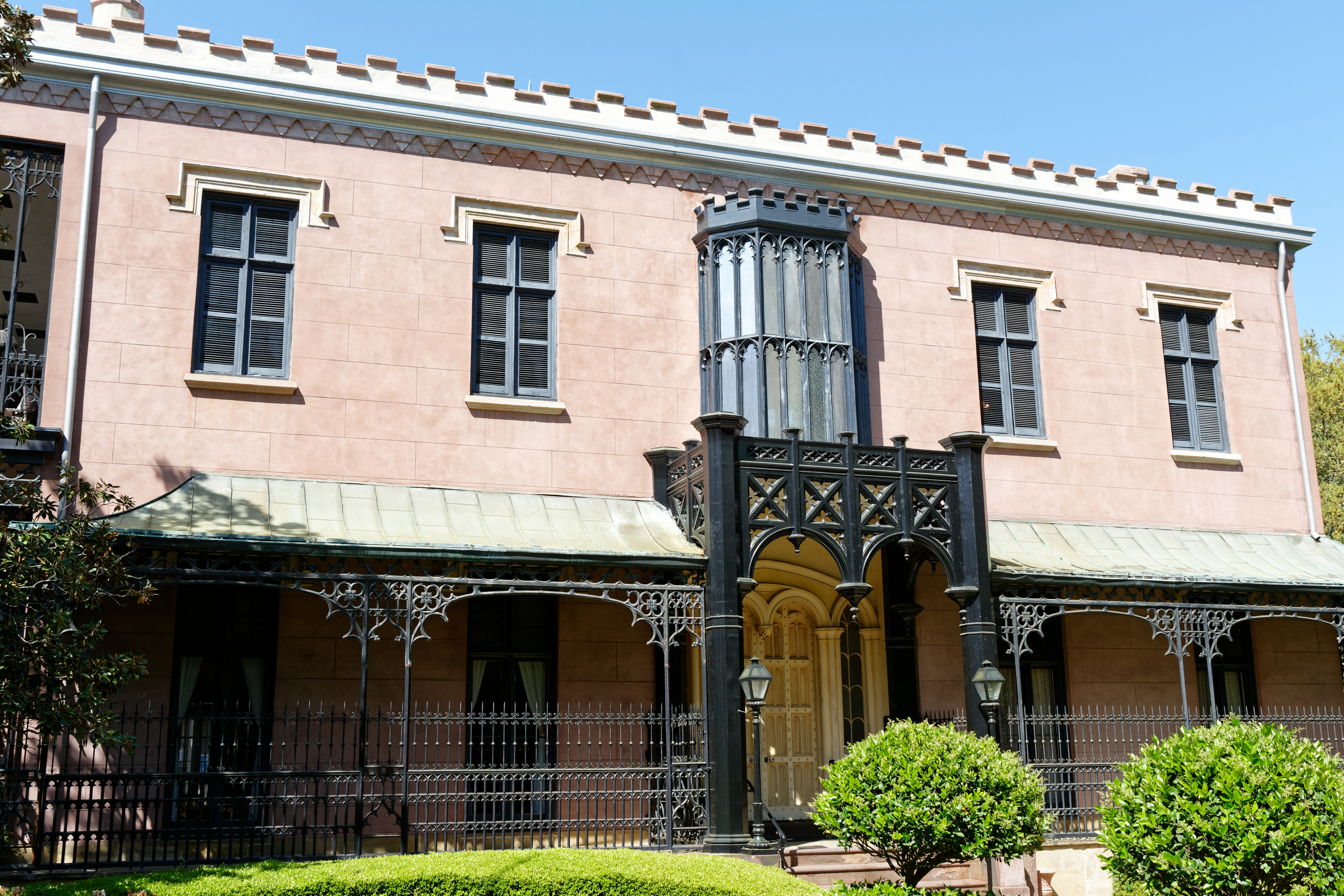
Green–Meldrim House

- Owens–Thomas House (NRHP and National Landmark)
- Isaiah Davenport House (NRHP)
- Oliver Sturges House (NHRP)
- William Scarbrough House (NRHP and National Landmark)
- Green–Meldrim House (NRHP and National Landmark)
- Henry Cunningham House – Built in 1810 for Reverend Henry Cunningham, founder of the Second African Baptist Church; oldest building in Savannah constructed for a person of color. Part of the Savannah Historic District.
- Telfair Academy (NRHP)

Other buildings

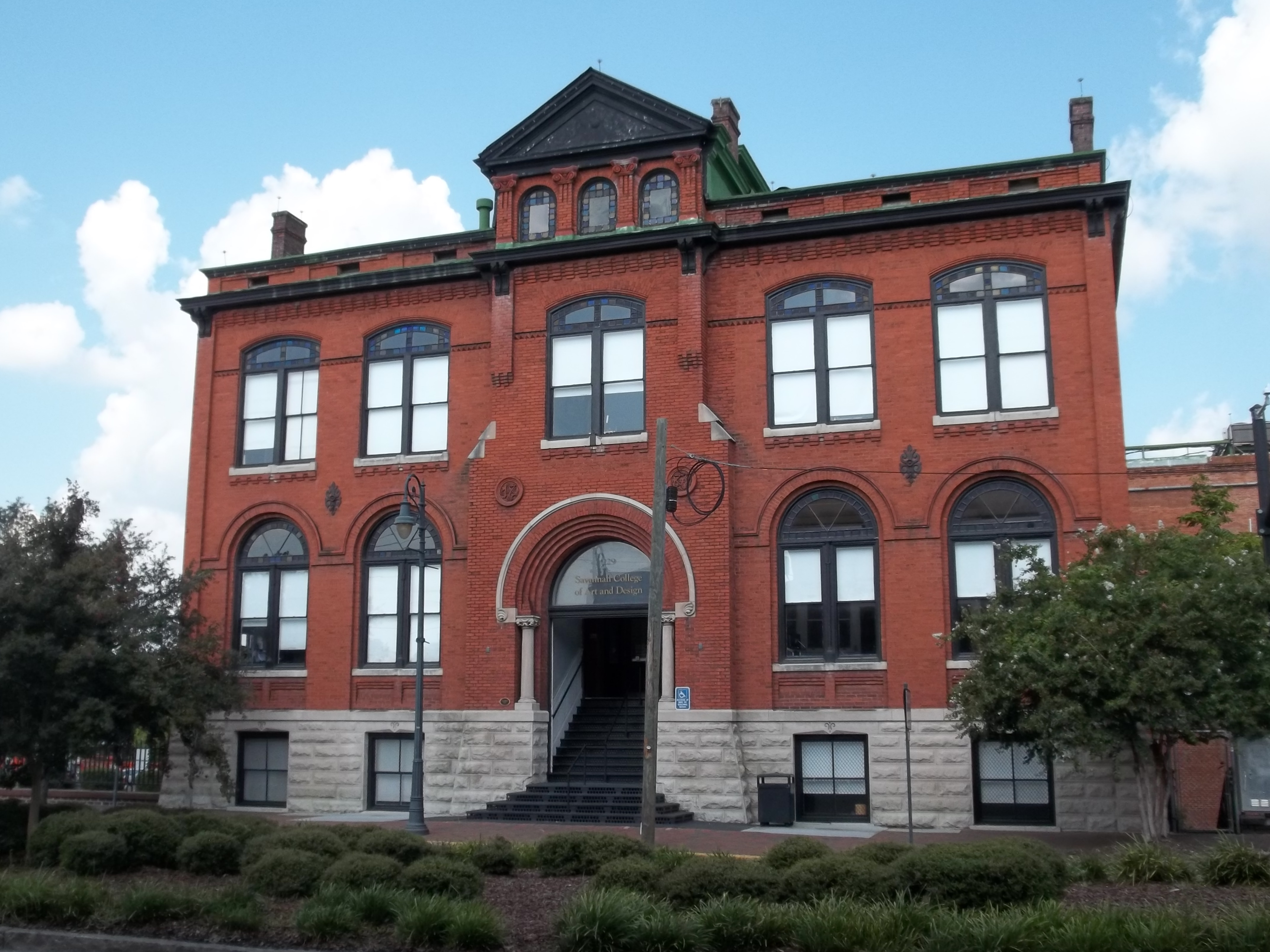
Central of Georgia Railway Company Shop Property

- Atlantic Greyhound Bus Terminal (NRHP)
- Central of Georgia Depot and Trainshed (NRHP and National Landmark)
- Central of Georgia Railway Company Shop Property (NRHP)
- Georgia State Railroad Museum (NRHP)
- Charity Hospital (NRHP)
- Tomochichi Federal Building and United States Courthouse (NRHP)
- First Bryan Baptist Church (NRHP)
- Hill Hall (Savannah State College) (NRHP)
- W. B. Hodgson Hall (NRHP)
- St. Philip African Methodist Episcopal Church (NRHP)

Historic districts

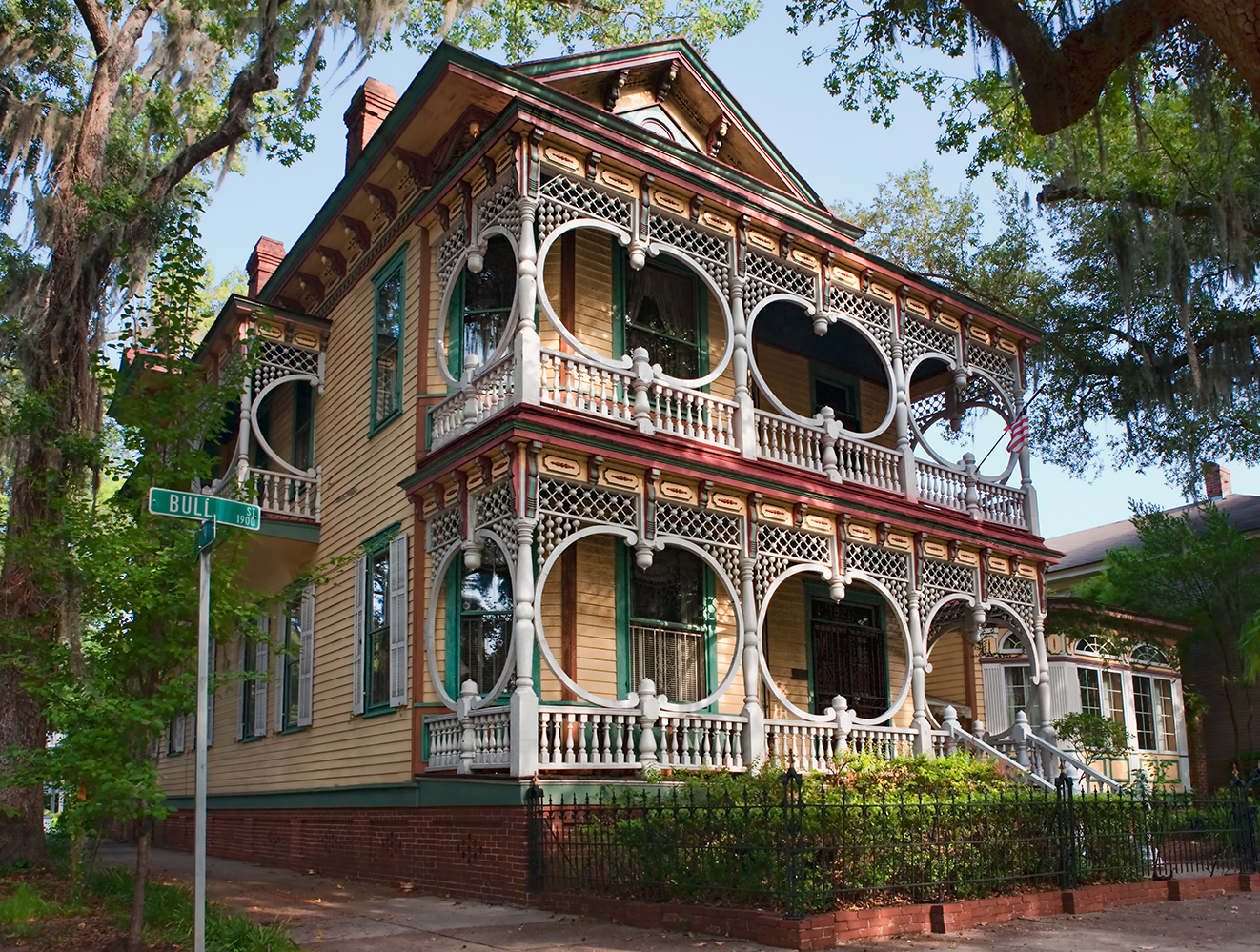
The Gingerbread House, at 1921 Bull Street, is in Savannah's Victorian Historic District

- Juliette Gordon Low Historic District (NRHP and National Historic Landmark District)
- Carver Village Historic District (NRHP)
- Cuyler–Brownville Historic District (NRHP)
- Daffin Park–Parkside Place Historic District (NRHP)
- Eastside Historic District (NRHP)
- Fairway Oaks–Greenview Historic District (NRHP)
- Gordonston Historic District (NRHP)
- Isle of Hope Historic District (NRHP)
- Kensington Park–Groveland Historic District (NRHP)
- Pine Gardens Historic District (NRHP)
- Savannah Historic District (NRHP)
- Savannah Victorian Historic District (NRHP)
- Ardsley Park-Chatham Crescent Historic District

== See also ==
- History of Savannah, Georgia
- Buildings in Savannah Historic District
- Historic Savannah Foundation
- National Register of Historic Places listings in Chatham County, Georgia
