= 117–119 Houston Street =

Historic building in Savannah, Georgia, U.S.

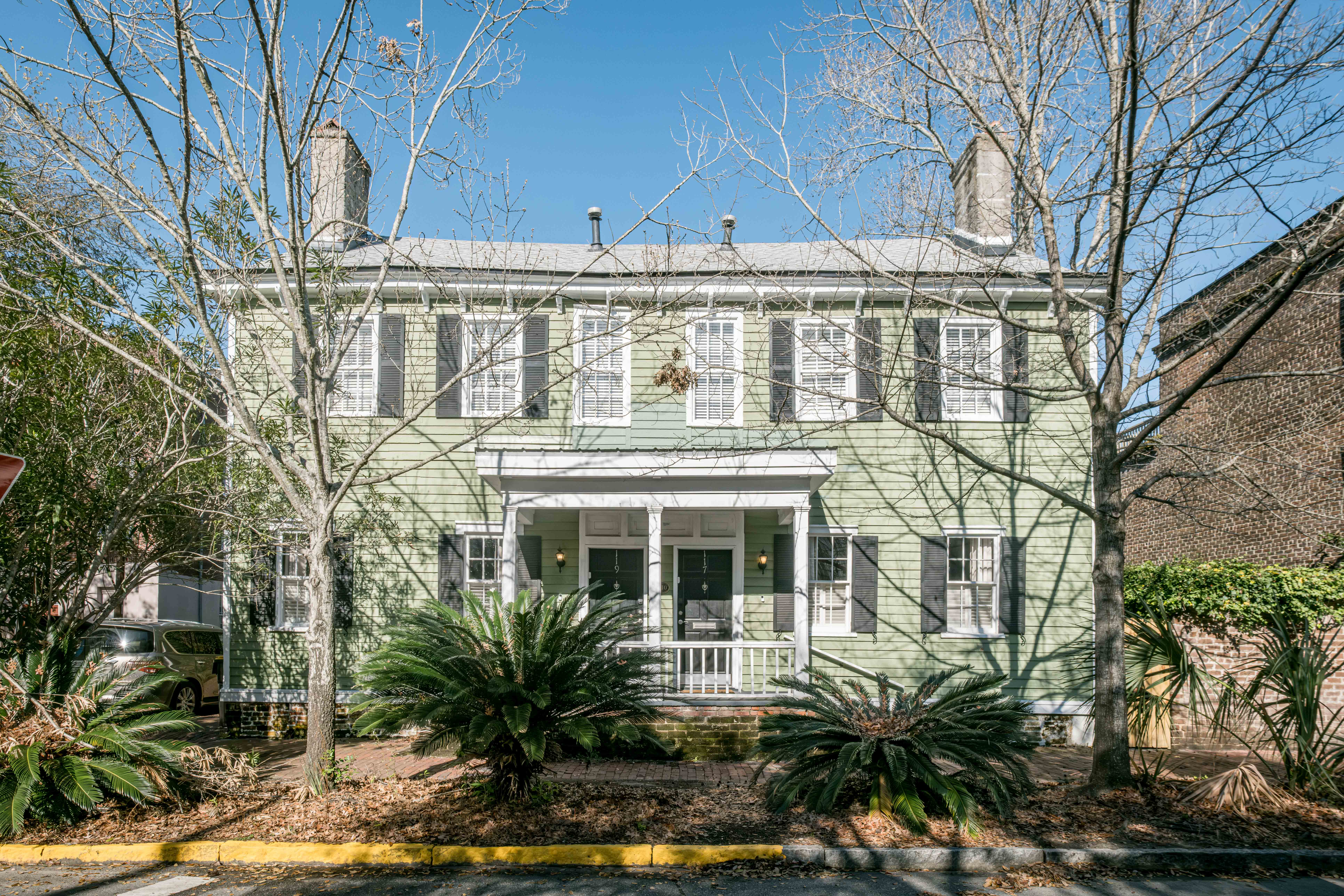
- Pictured in 2025
- Interactive map of the 117–119 Houston Street area
- Alternative names: Henry Cunningham House or Henry Cunningham Estate

General information
- Location: Savannah, Georgia, U.S., 117–119 Houston Street
- Coordinates: 32.07681°N 81.08610°W
- Completed: 1810 (216 years ago)

Technical details
- Floor count: 3

117–119 Houston Street (also known as The Henry Cunningham House or The Henry Cunningham Estate) is a historic building in Savannah, Georgia, United States. A duplex, it is located on Houston Street in the northwestern tything of Greene Square and was built in 1810. It is part of the Savannah Historic District. It is considered the oldest building constructed for a person of color in Savannah.

== History ==
=== Henry Cunningham ===
The house was built in 1810 for Reverend Henry Cunningham (1759–1842) and his wife Elizabeth, a businesswoman. Cunningham was a formerly enslaved African-American Baptist minister who, in 1802, co-founded and became the first pastor of the Second African Baptist Church on Greene Square. He served as its pastor for over thirty years, until 1833.

Cunningham was also a successful businessman who operated a hauling business and was among the foremost African-American businessmen in antebellum Savannah. Under his pastoral guidance, many new ministers were trained and sent out to Savannah's expanding network of Black churches. He died on March 29, 1842, aged 82 or 83, and is buried at Laurel Grove Cemetery South in Savannah.

=== Greene Square ===
The house sits on the northern edge of Greene Square, one of Savannah's original ward squares. In the 19th century, Greene Square was a central hub for Savannah's African-American community. The Second African Baptist Church, which Cunningham founded, stood directly across the square at 123 Houston Street, and served as a focal point of civic and religious life for free and enslaved Black residents alike.

=== Later history ===
After Cunningham's death in 1842, the property passed through several uses, including a period as a girls' orphanage. The building was eventually converted into the duplex configuration it retains today. It has remained on its original site on Greene Square for over two centuries.

== Architecture and current use ==
The building is a three-story wood-frame structure. It features elements characteristic of early 19th-century Savannah residential architecture, including a front porch with classical columns and louvered shutters. The duplex is currently configured with the 119 unit as two bedrooms and one bath, and the 117 unit as two bedrooms and one-and-a-half baths. The building is currently operated as a licensed short-term rental.

== See also ==
- List of the oldest buildings in the United States
- List of historic houses and buildings in Savannah, Georgia
