= Houston Street (Savannah, Georgia) =

Prominent street in Savannah, Georgia

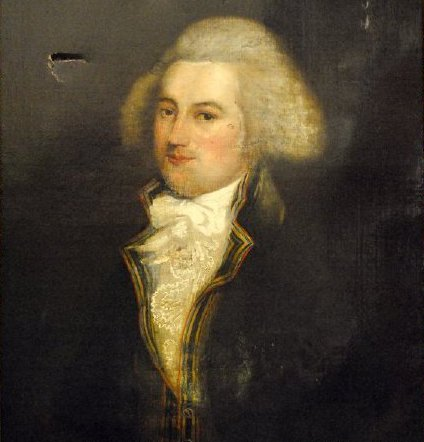
- The street's namesake, William Houstoun
- Namesake: William Houstoun
- Length: 0.44 mi (0.71 km)
- Location: Savannah, Georgia, U.S.
- North end: East Bay Street
- South end: East Liberty Street

Houston Street (/ˈhaʊstən/ HOW-stən) is a prominent street in Savannah, Georgia, United States. Located between Price Street to the west and East Broad Street to the east, it runs for about 0.44 miles (0.71 km) from East Bay Street in the north to East Liberty Street in the south. The street is named for prominent Georgian William Houstoun, whose portrait hangs in the rotunda of Savannah City Hall. It passes through the Savannah Historic District, a National Historic Landmark District.

Houston Street goes around four of Savannah's 22 squares. They are (from north to south):

- Washington Square
- Greene Square
- Crawford Square
- Whitefield Square

== Notable buildings and structures ==
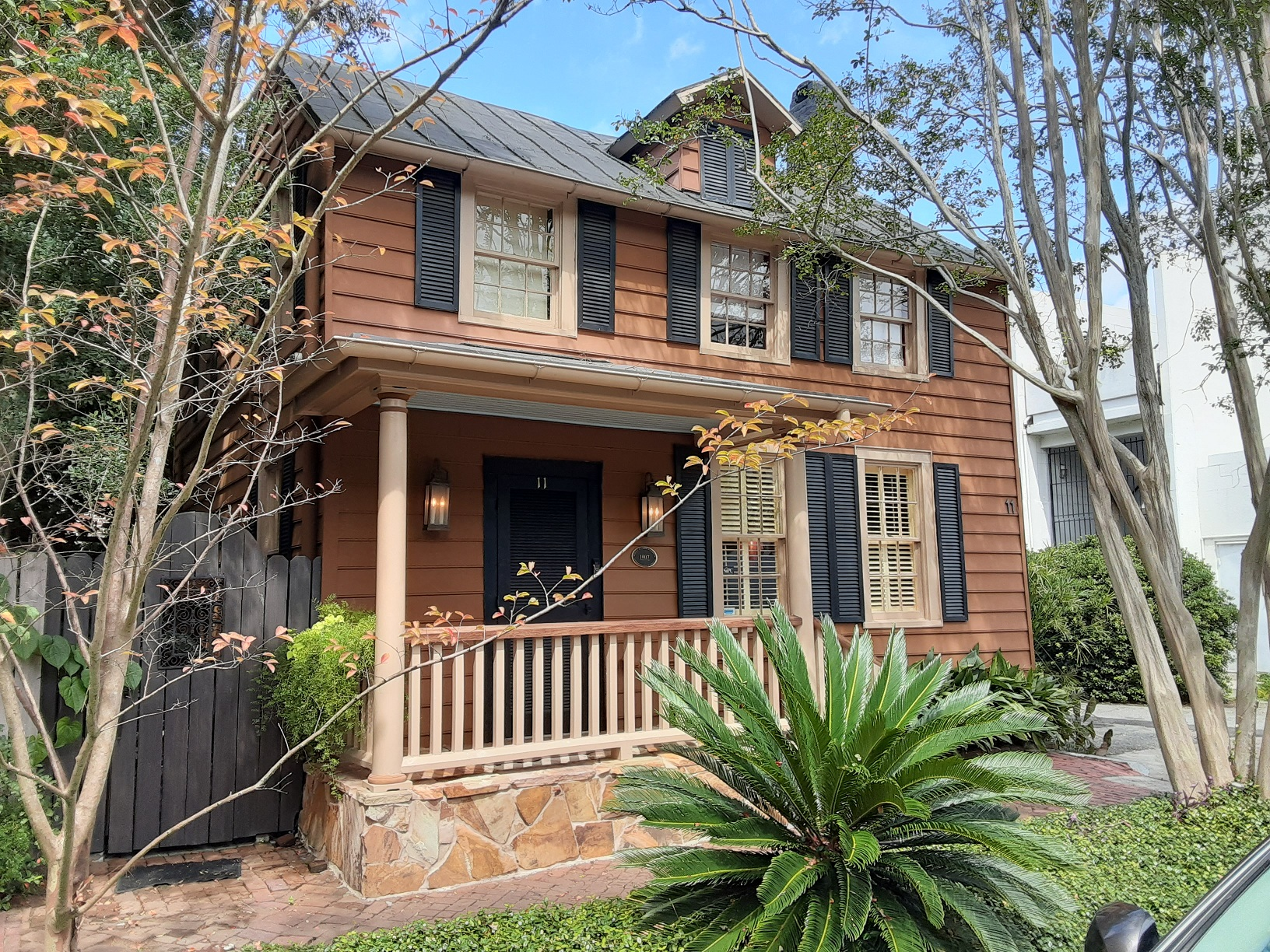
Joseph Wilkinson House, 11 Houston Street (1807)

Below is a selection of notable buildings and structures on Houston Street, all in Savannah's Historic District. From north to south:

- 601 East Bay Street (has an entrance on Houston Street) (1860)
- Joseph Wilkinson House, 11 Houston Street (1807)
- Morty Dorgan Property, 20 Houston Street (1853)
- Simon Mirault House, 21 Houston Street (1852)
- Joachim Hartstene House, 23 Houston Street (circa 1803)
- Catherine McCarthy Property, 26–30 Houston Street (1887)
- Laurence Dunn Property (I), 31–33 Houston Street (1875)
- Laurence Dunn Property (II), 35–37 Houston Street (1872)
- James King House, 113 Houston Street (1854)
- Henry Cunningham House, 117–119 Houston Street (by 1810)
- Second African Baptist Church, 123 Houston Street (1926)
- 124 Houston Street (1814–1816)
- Jeremiah Murphy House, 129 Houston Street (1904)
- 131 Houston Street (1807)
- 134–142 Houston Street (circa 1926) – formerly the Kate Baldwin Free Kindergarten
- 216–222 Houston Street (1910)
- John Tucker Property, 224 Houston Street (1850)
