= 542 East State Street =

Historic building in Georgia, United States

- William Wall House
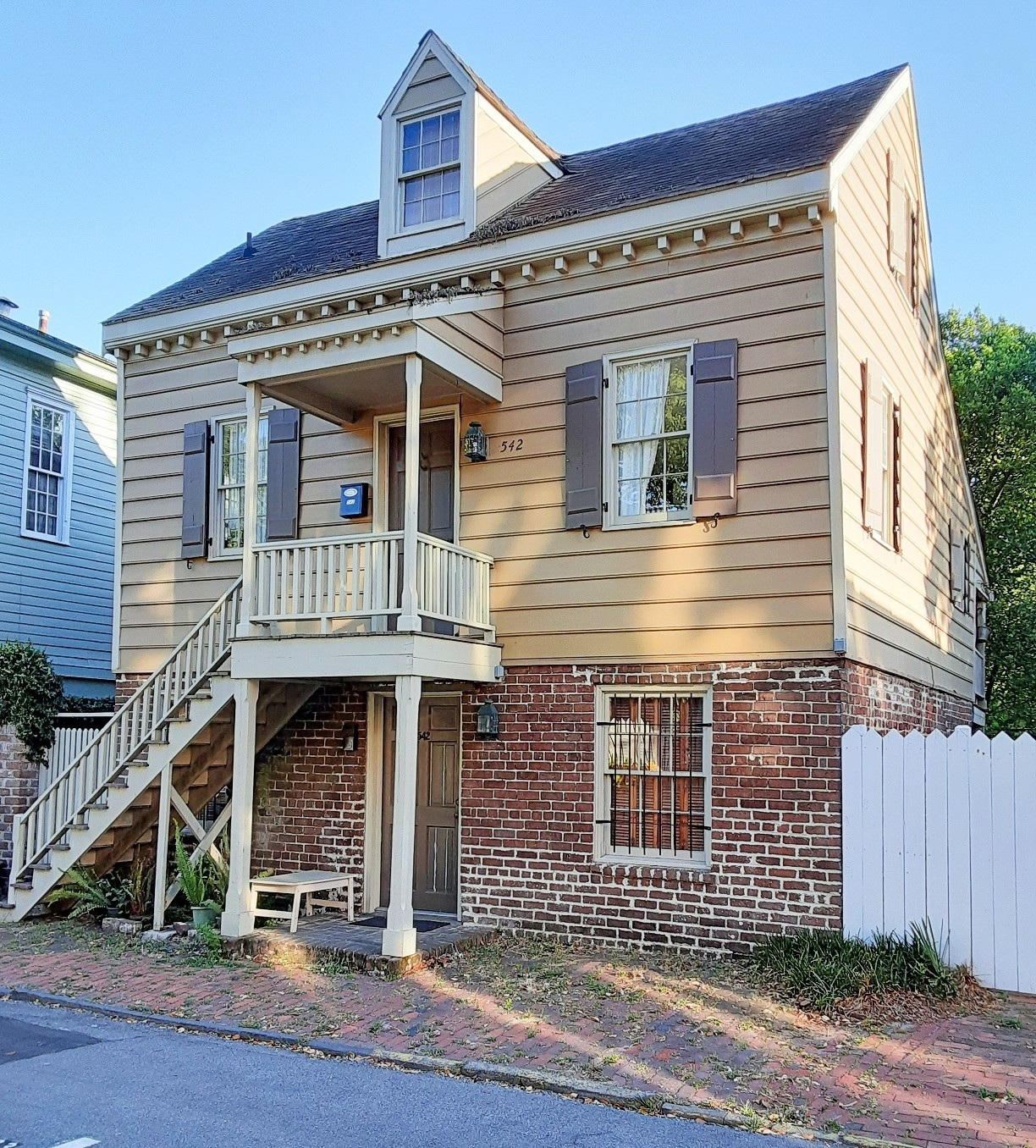
- Interactive map of the 542 East State Street area

General information
- Location: Savannah, Georgia, U.S., 542 East State Street
- Coordinates: 32.07662°N 81.08549°W
- Completed: c. 1818; 208 years ago

Technical details
- Floor count: 2

542 East State Street, also known as the William Wall House, is a historic building in Savannah, Georgia, United States. It is located in the northeastern tything of Greene Square and was built c. 1818 (although a plaque on its front states it was the home of Joseph Ryan in 1791). It is part of the Savannah Historic District. It was originally built for William and Charlotte Wall, leaders in the Second African Baptist Church.

== See also ==
- Buildings in Savannah Historic District
