= Henry Cunningham (minister) =

First minister of the Second African Baptist Church in Savannah, Georgia

The Reverend Henry Cunningham
- Born: 1759
- Died: March 29, 1842 (aged 82 or 83)
- Resting place: Laurel Grove Cemetery South, Savannah, Georgia, U.S.
- Occupation: Baptist minister

Henry Cunningham (1759 – March 29, 1842) was a formerly enslaved African-American Baptist minister who was the first minister of the Second African Baptist Church in Savannah, Georgia, United States. Their former home, at 117–119 Houston Street in Savannah, is considered the oldest building constructed for a person of color in that city.

== Life and career ==
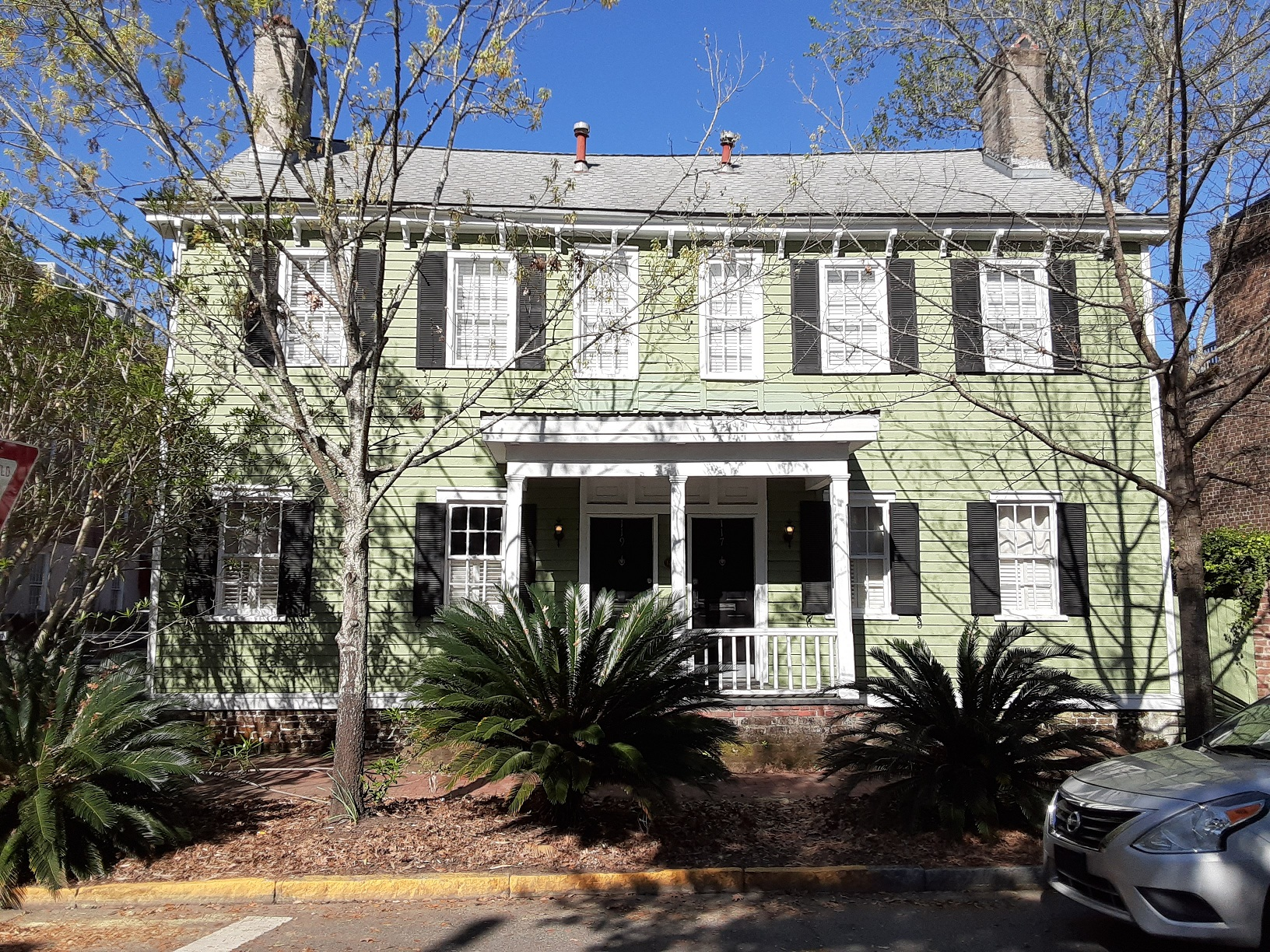
The Henry Cunningham House in Savannah, Georgia

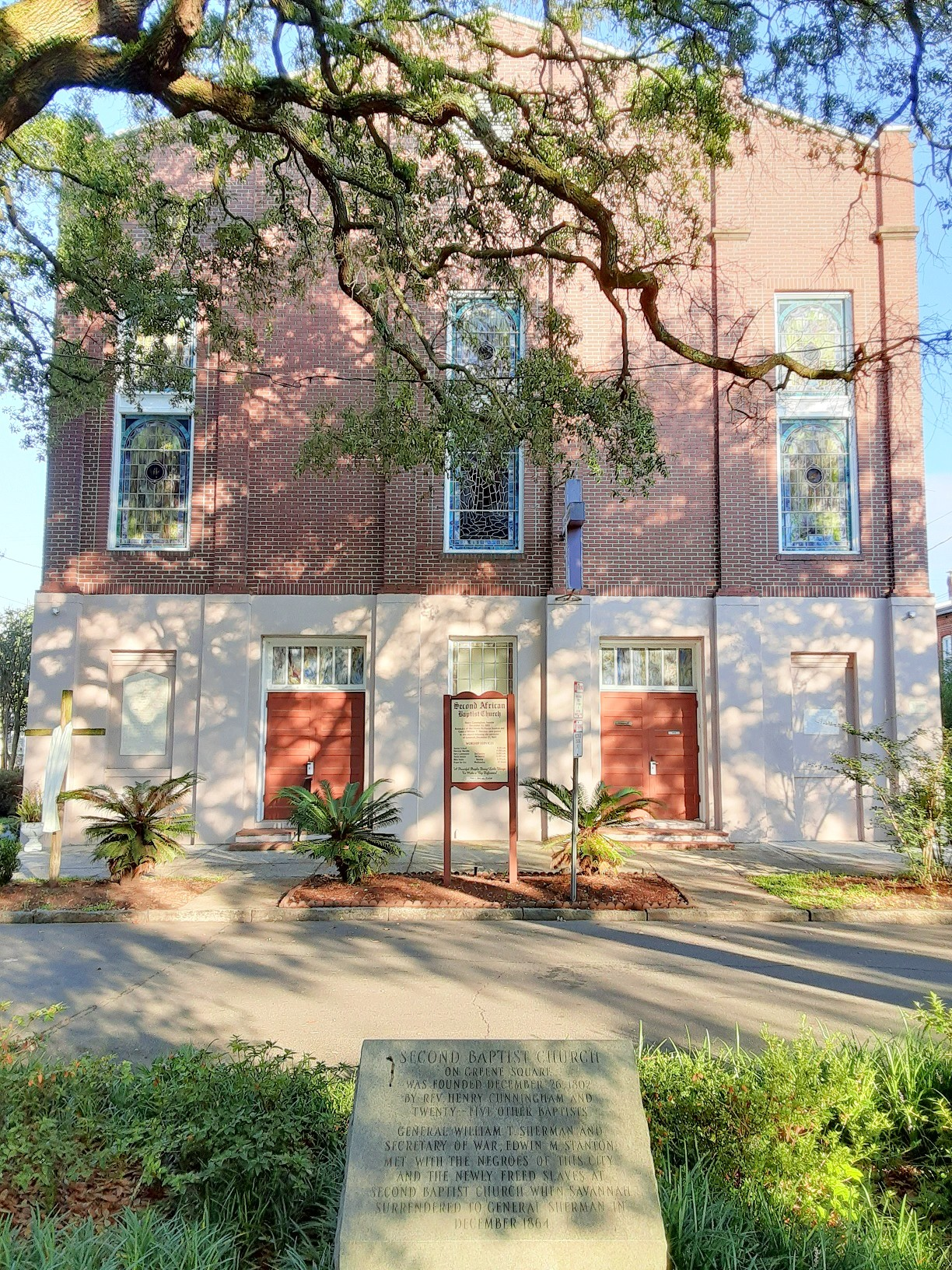
Savannah's Second African Baptist Church

Cunningham was born in 1759. He served as the first minister of the Second African Baptist Church in Greene Square, Savannah, Georgia, between 1802 and 1833. He established the church with 25 other Baptists.

In 1810, he had built today's home at 117–119 Houston Street in Savannah, today known as the Henry Cunningham House.

== Death ==
Cunningham died in 1842, aged 82 or 83. His wife, Betsey, preceded him in death by four years. They are both interred in Laurel Grove Cemetery South in Savannah, having been removed from their initial resting place, a Negro burial ground near Whitefield Square.
