= Greene Square (Savannah, Georgia) =

Public square in Savannah, Georgia

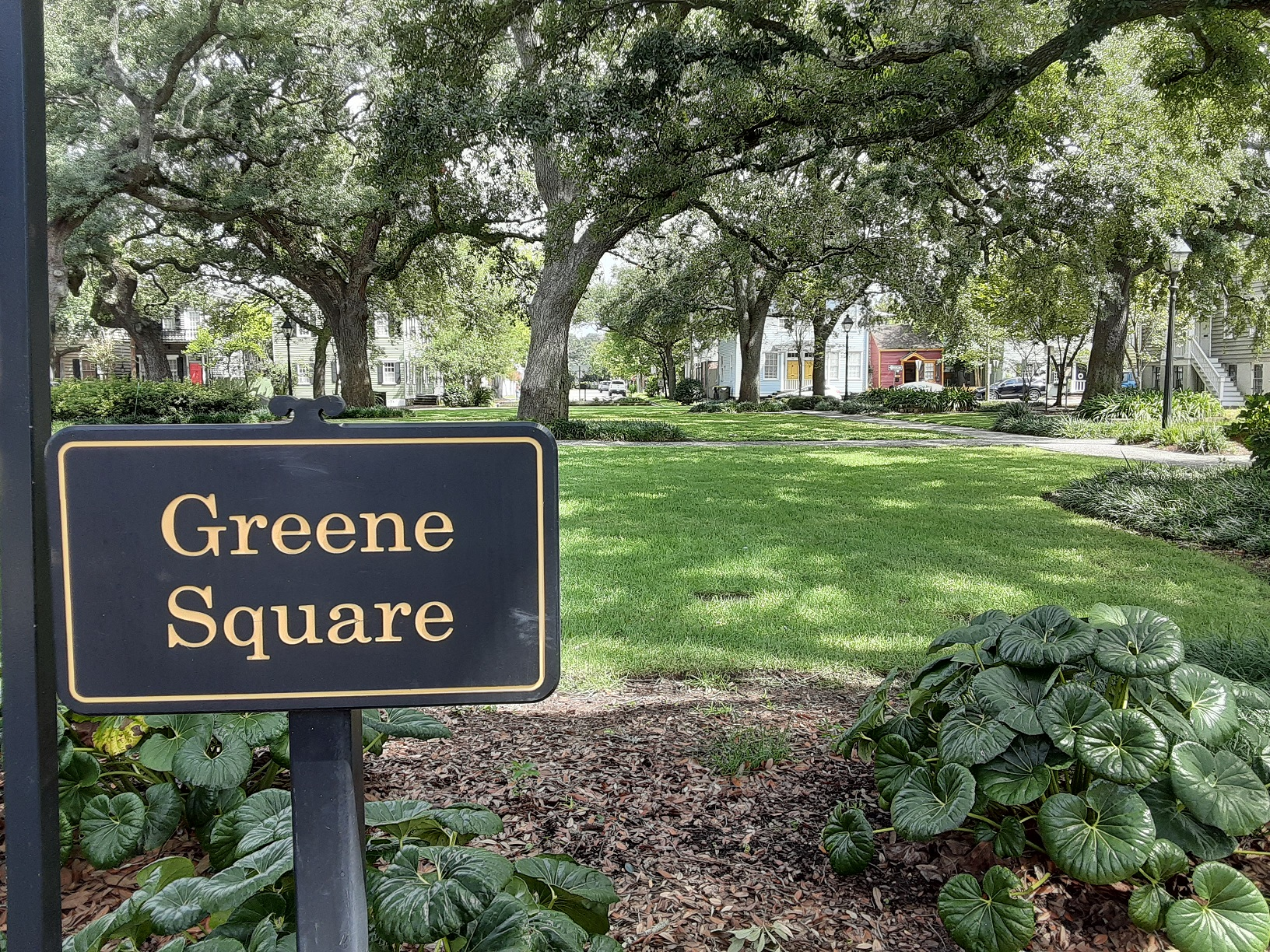
- Greene Square, laid out in 1799, with the John Dorsett House in view in the background
- Interactive map of Greene Square
- Namesake: Nathanael Greene
- Maintained by: City of Savannah
- Location: Savannah, Georgia, U.S.
- Coordinates: 32.0763°N 81.0861°W
- North: Houston Street
- East: East President Street
- South: Houston Street
- West: East President Street

Construction
- Completion: 1799 (227 years ago)

Greene Square is one of the 22 squares of Savannah, Georgia, United States. It is the easternmost square in the second row of the city's five rows of squares. The square is located on Houston Street and East President Street, and is south of Washington Square, east of Columbia Square and north of Crawford Square. The oldest buildings on the square are at 510 East York Street, 509 East President Street (both former properties of George Jones) and 503 East President Street (Thomas Williams House), each in the southwestern trust/civic block, which are believed to have been built at the same time as the square itself (1799).

The square is named for Revolutionary War hero General Nathanael Greene, an aide to George Washington. A native of Rhode Island, Greene commanded Southern forces during the Revolution, and after the war settled at Mulberry Grove, an estate fourteen miles (23 km) above Savannah. Greene, along with his son, is actually buried in Savannah's Johnson Square.

134 Houston Street, in the square's southeastern tything block, dates to the late 1800s. Between 1899 and the mid-1900s it was the home of the Kate Baldwin Free Kindergarten.

Greene Square was once the center of Savannah's African-American community. In the northwestern trust lot is the Second African Baptist Church, the site where Union Army general William Tecumseh Sherman announced Special Field Orders 15, better known as "40 acres and a mule".

546–548 East President Street (known as the Mary Cullum Property, now occupied by the Green Palm Inn) are two seamen's cottages, built circa 1897.

The John Dorsett House, in the northwestern tything, is the smallest free-standing house in the city, hence its nickname Tiny House. It was moved here from 422 Hull Street.

In 1967, Savannah landscape architect Clermont Huger Lee and banker Mills B. Lane planned and initiated a project to replace the cistern that caved-in, design and install shoring, close the fire lane, and install new walks, benches, lighting and planting.

== Dedication ==
Namesake	Image	Note
Nathanael Greene		The square is named for Revolutionary War hero Nathanael Greene (1742–1786).

== Constituent buildings ==
Each building below is in one of the eight blocks around the square composed of four residential "tything" blocks and four civic ("trust") blocks, now known as the Oglethorpe Plan. They are listed with construction years where known.

Northwestern tything/residential block

- Anderson Row, 502–512 East State Street (1890)
- 514 East State Street (1900)
- 516 East State Street (1900)
- Ann Rossiter House, 520 East State Street (1900)
- Henry Cunningham House, 117–119 Houston Street (1810) – built for Henry Cunningham, Free Man of Color. By 1812, it was the site of the Savannah Female Asylum
- James King House, 113 Houston Street (1854)
- 51 East Broughton Lane

Northwestern trust/civic block

- Second African Baptist Church, 123 Houston Street (1926)
- 502–508 East President Street

Southwestern trust/civic block

- 131 Houston Street (1807)
- Jeremiah Murphy House, 129 Houston Street (1904)
- George Jones House (1), 509 East President Street (1799–1808) – joint-oldest building on the square
- 505 East President Street (1853)
- Thomas Williams House, 503 East President Street (1799–1808) – joint-oldest building on the square
- Anthony Mira House, 505 East President Street (1853)
- William Herman Duplex, 506–508 East York Street (1902)
- George Jones House (2), 510 East York Street (1799) – joint-oldest building on the square

Southwestern tything/residential block

- Deitrich Oetjen House, 503 East York Street (1897)
- 507 East York Street (1839)
- Frederick Heineman Property (1), 509 East York Street (1839)
- Teresa Neve House, 511 East York Street (1855)
- Catherine Devaux House, 513 East York Street (1853)
- 515 East York Street (1853)
- Susannah Clarke Cottage, 517 East York Street (1801–1808)
- Edward White Cottage, 519 East York Street (1812)
- Margaret McDonald House, 521 East York Street (1883)
- Frederick Heineman Property (2), 140 Price Street (1828)
- 515 East York Lane
- 508 East York Lane (1828) – the rear of 140 Price Street

Northeastern tything/residential block

- 532–534 East State Street (1897)
- John Dorsett House, 536 East State Street (1845) – moved from 422 Hull Street to Greene Square in the mid-20th century
- 538 East State Street (1818)
- 542 East State Street (1818)
- 548 East State Street (1860)
- Joseph Burke House, 550 East State Street (1854)
- 112 East Broughton Lane (1900)
- 111 East Broad Street (1841)
- 115 East Broad Street (1914)

Northeastern trust/civic block

- 124 Houston Street (1816)
- Mary Cullum Property, 546–548 East President Street (1897) – formerly two Victorian cottages; has been occupied by the Green Palm Inn since 1998. At that time the properties were combined into one. The properties were built for sea captains Samuel House and N. B. Sison.
- 125 East Broad Street (1914)

Southeastern trust/civic block

- 130 Houston Street
- 570 East York Street (1878)

Southeastern tything/residential block

- Kate Baldwin Free Kindergarten, 134–142 Houston Street (late 1800s)
- 545 East York Street

== Gallery ==
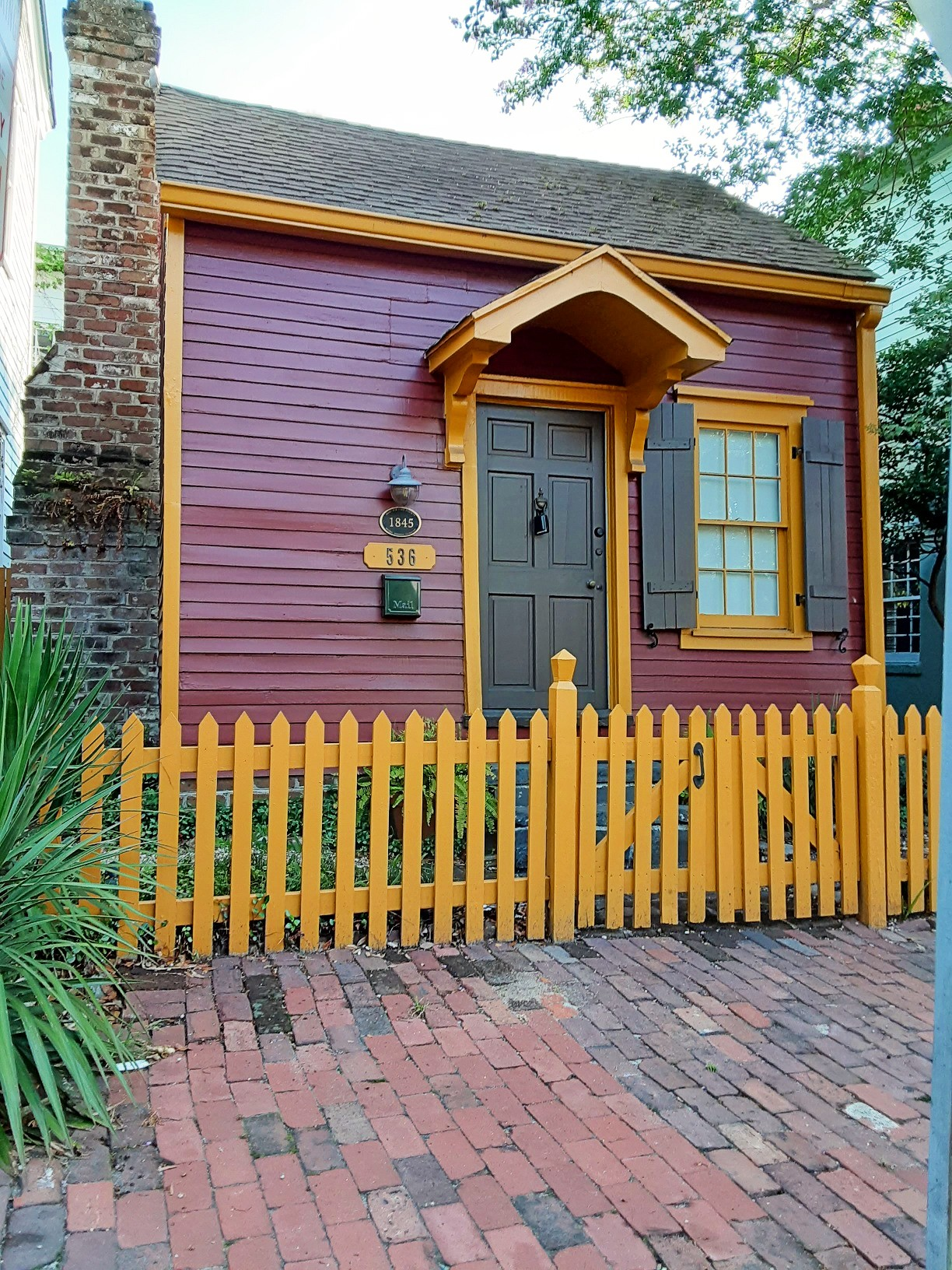
John Dorsett House, 536 East State Street

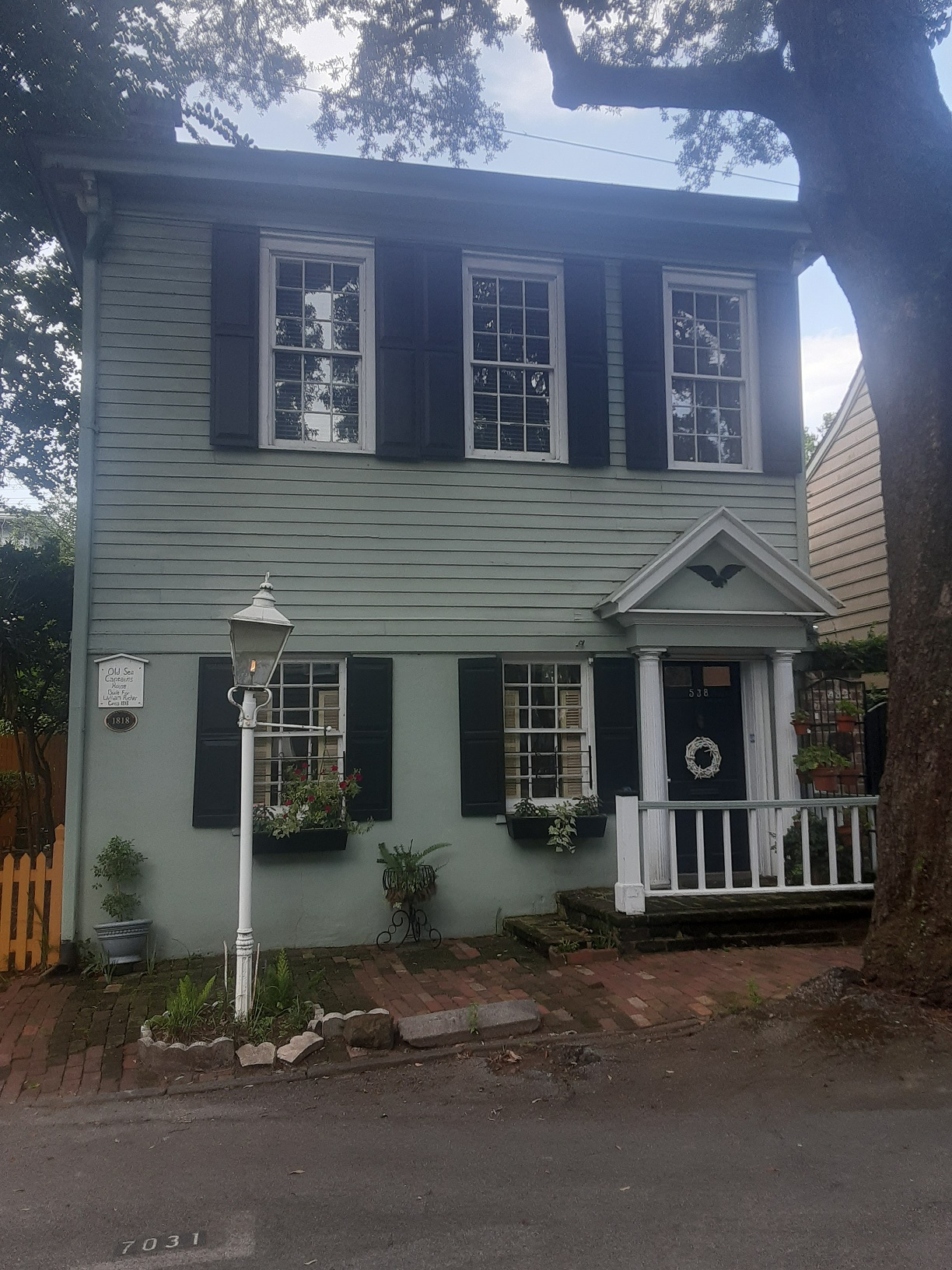
538 East State Street

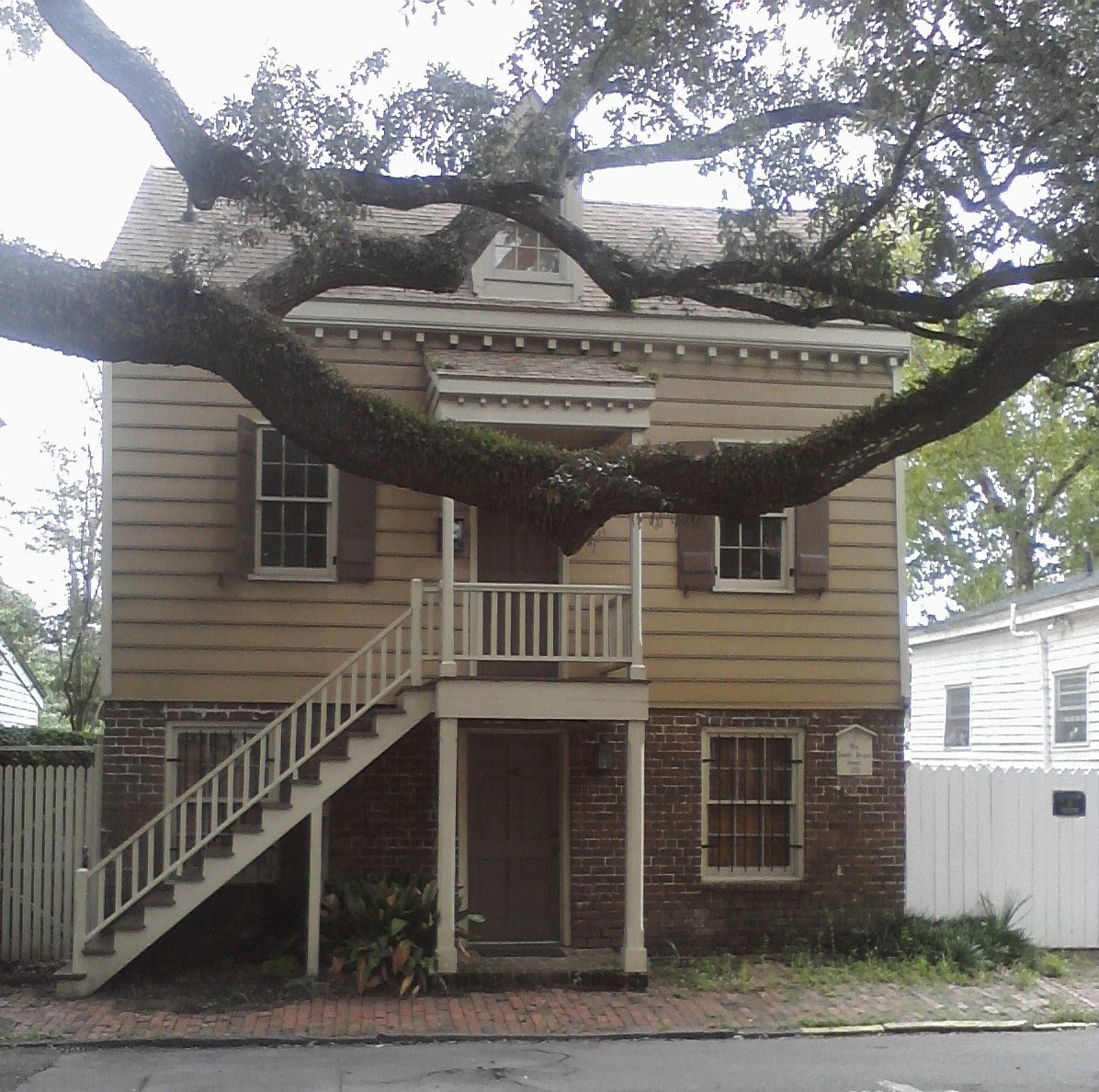
542 East State Street

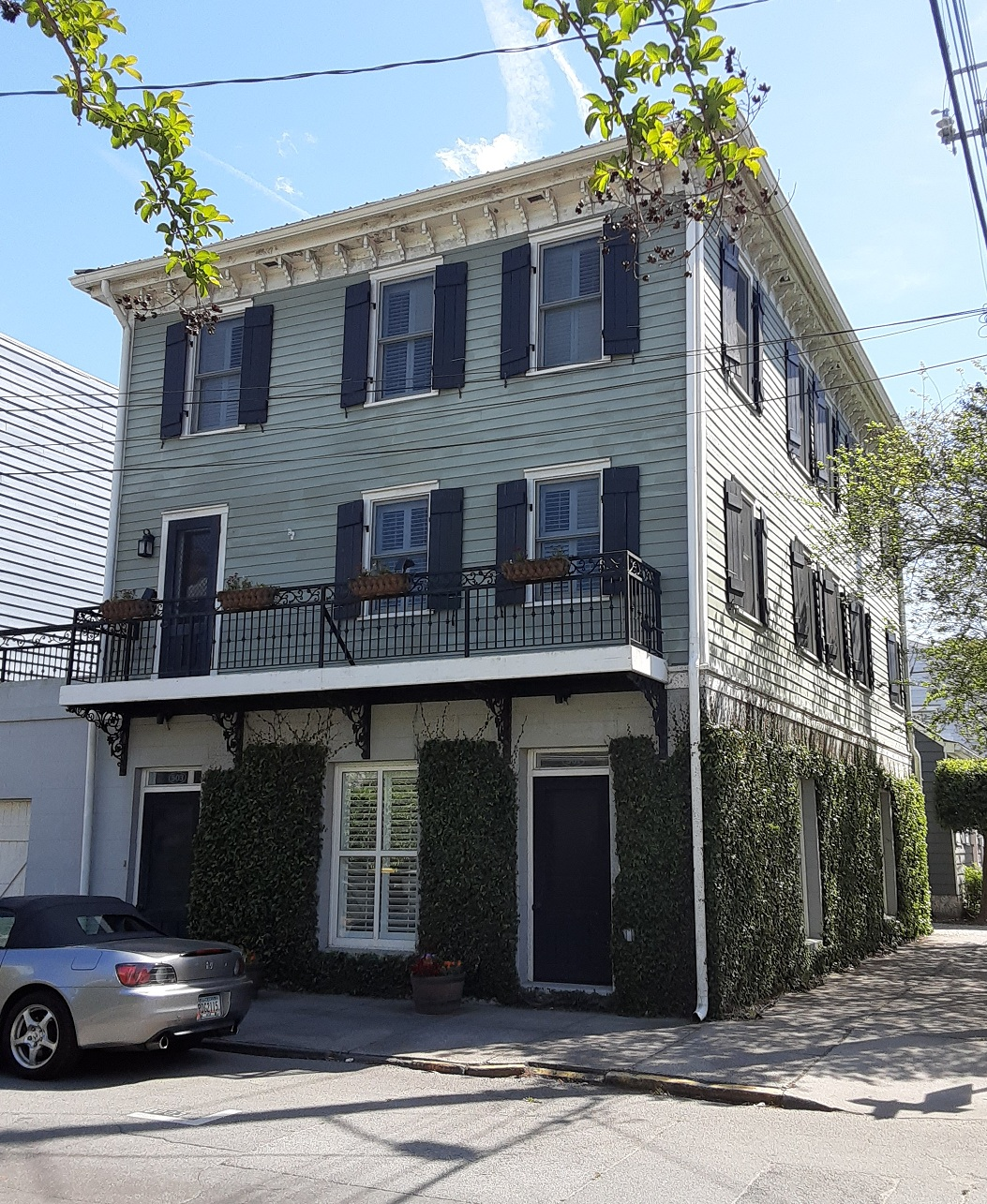
Deitrich Oetjen House, 503 East York Street

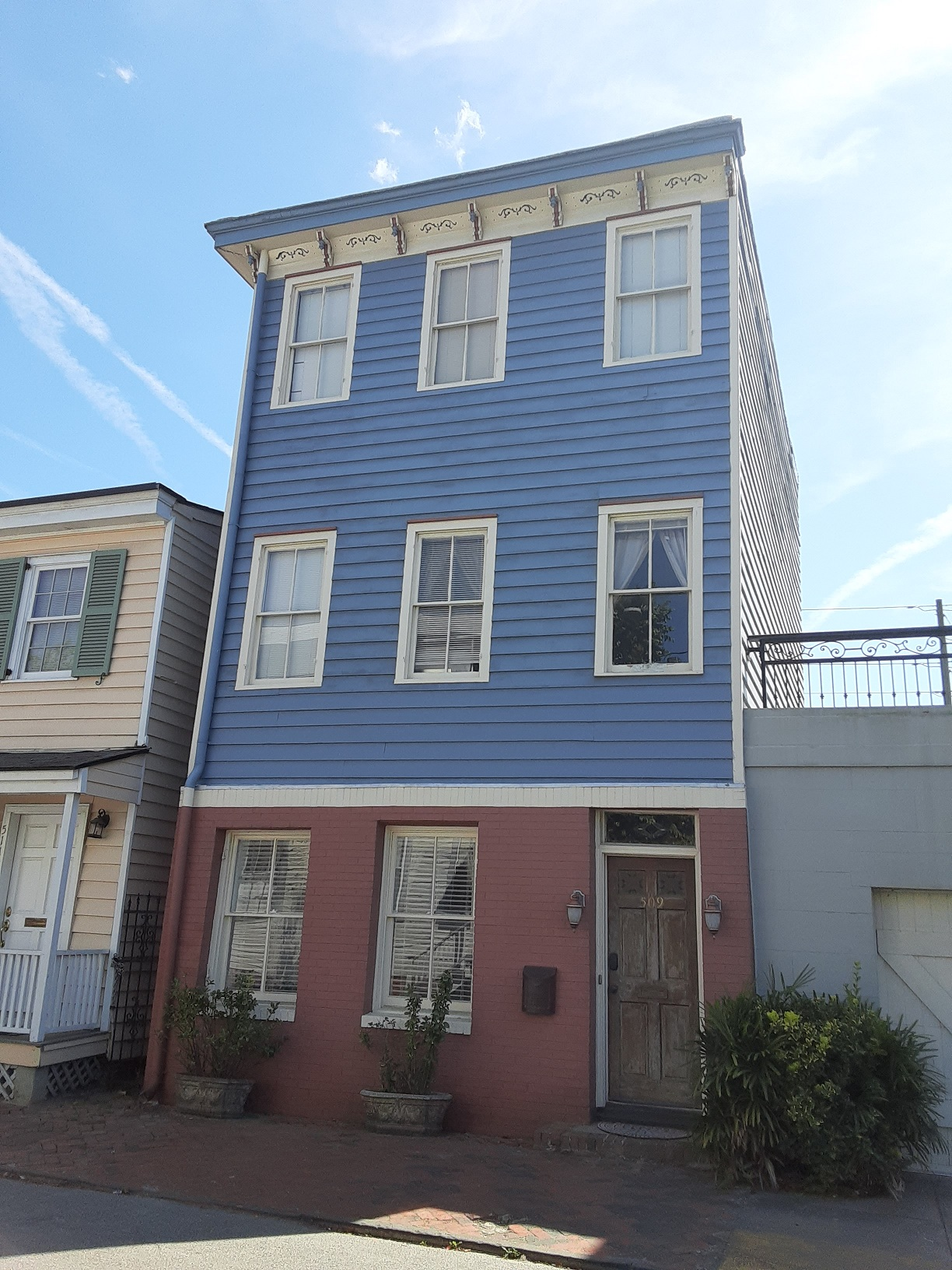
Frederick Heineman Property (1), 509 East York Street

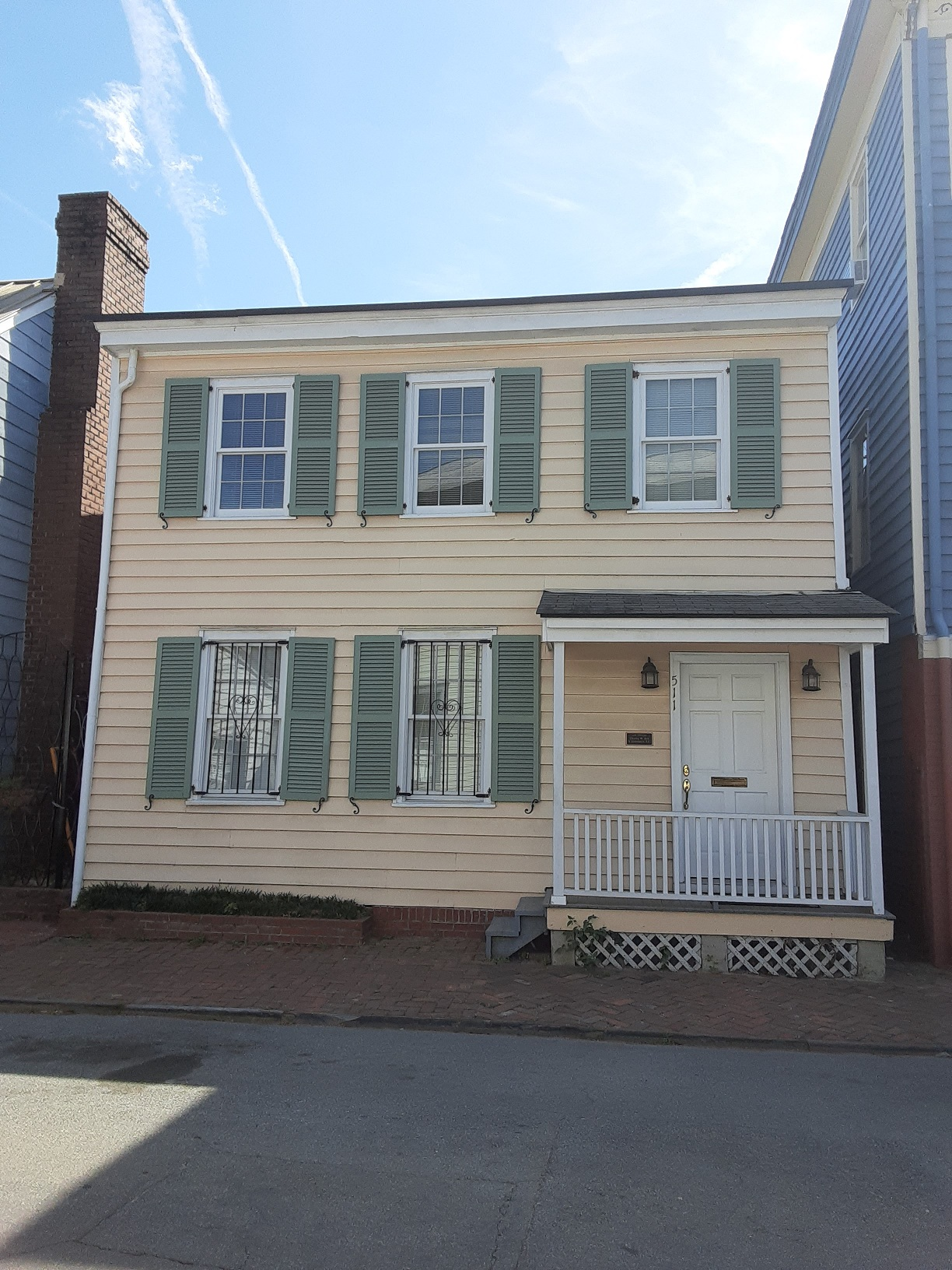
Teresa Neve House, 511 East York Street

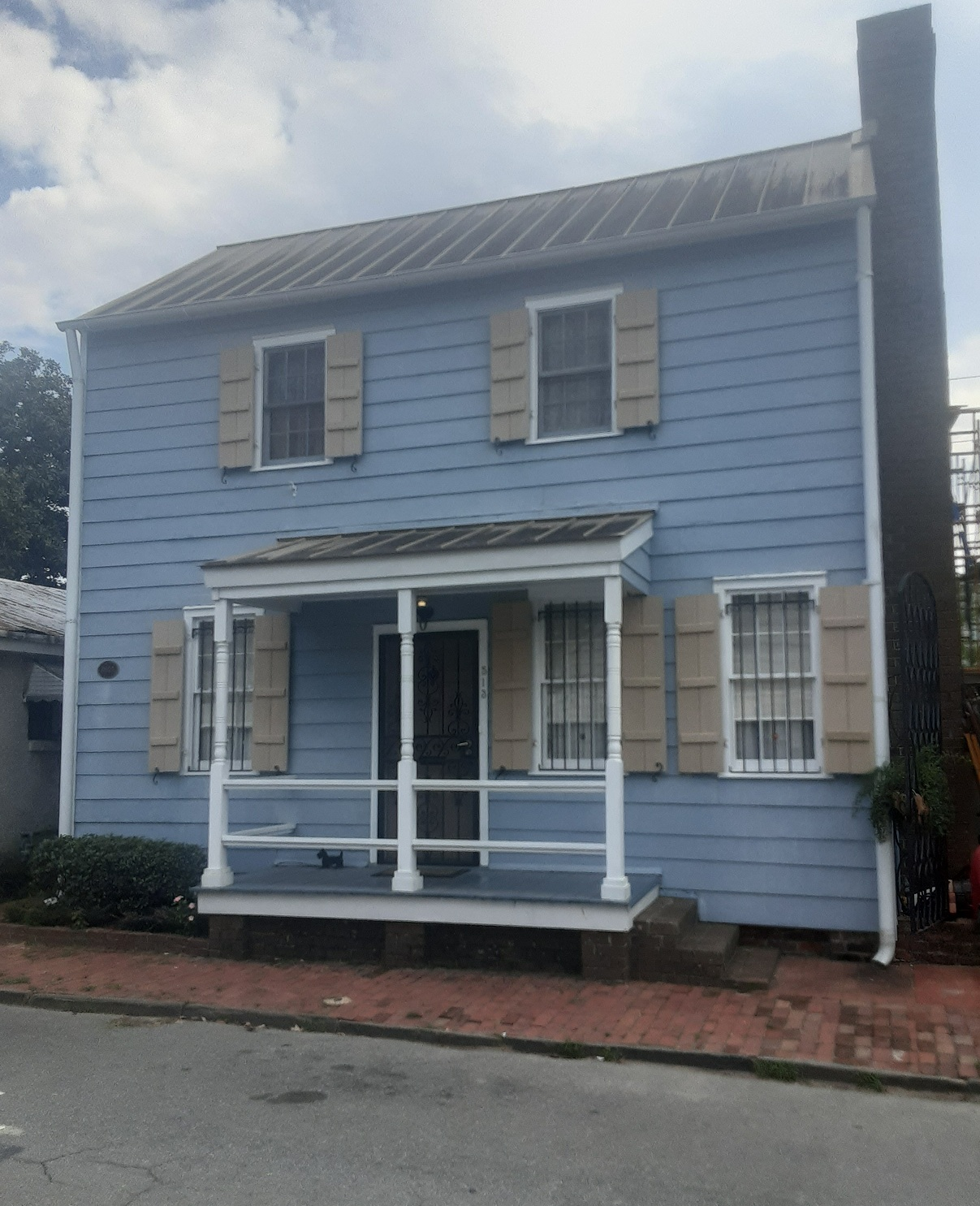
Catherine Devaux House, 513 East York Street

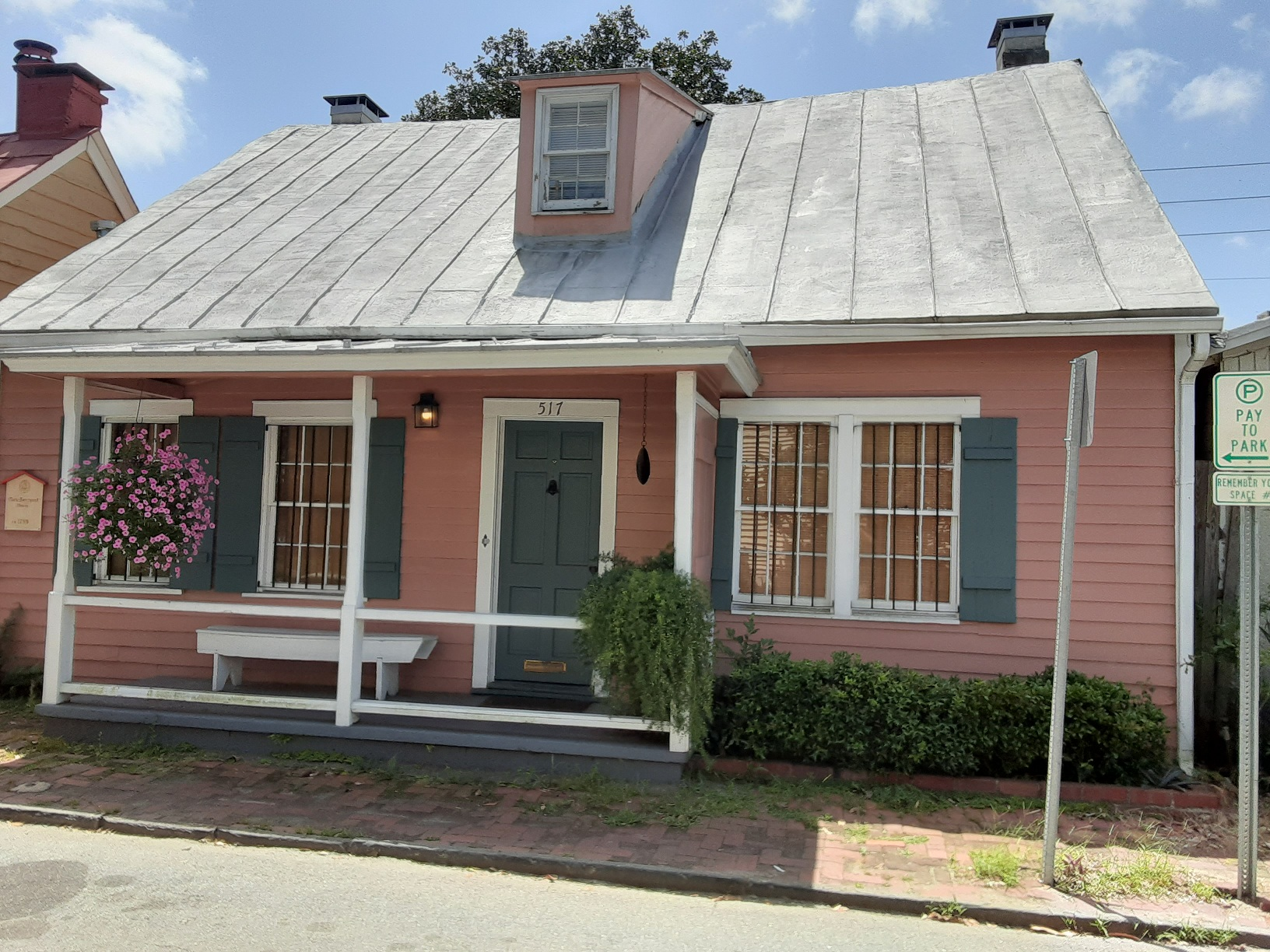
Susannah Clarke Cottage, 517 East York Street

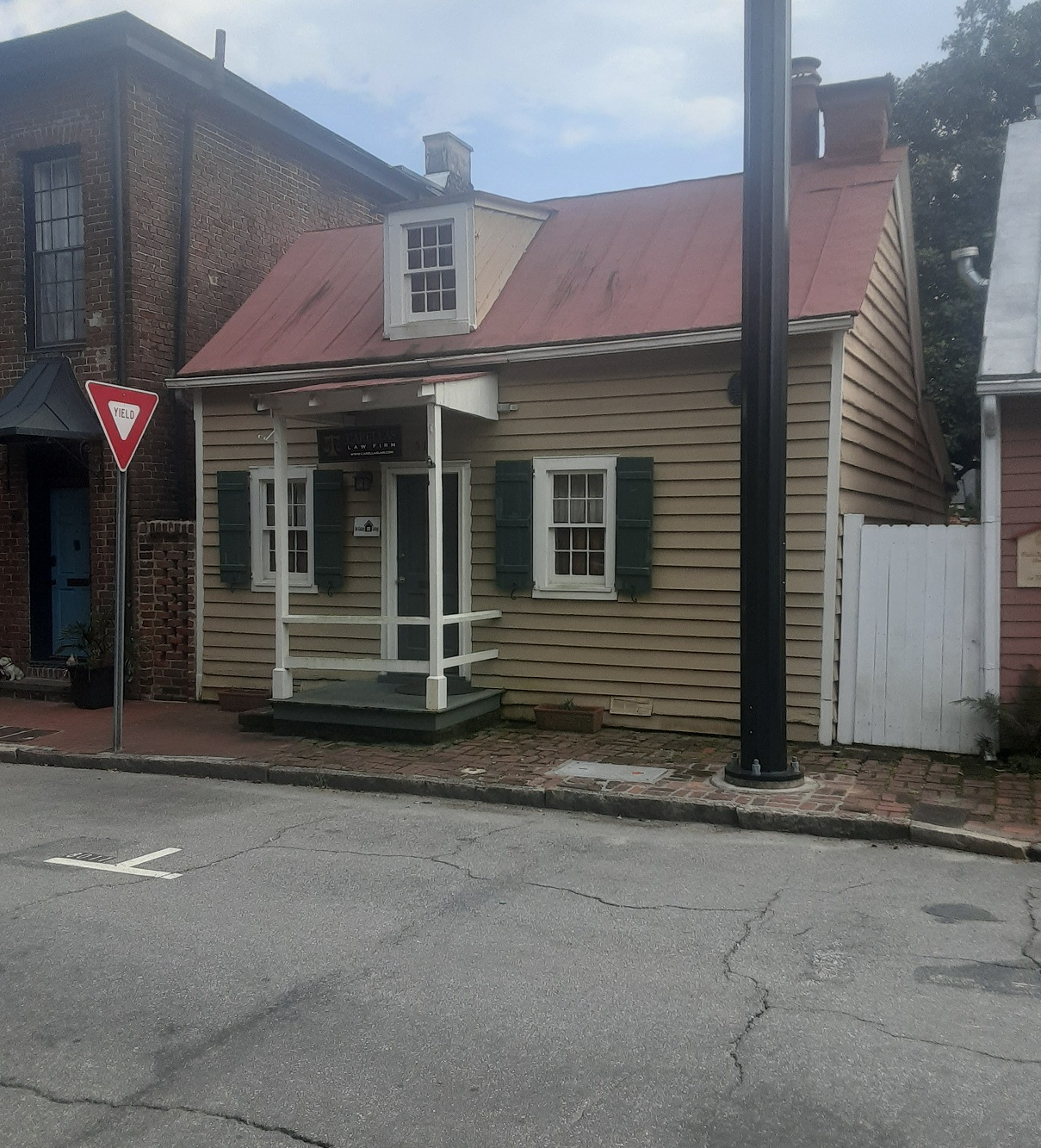
Edward White Cottage, 519 East York Street

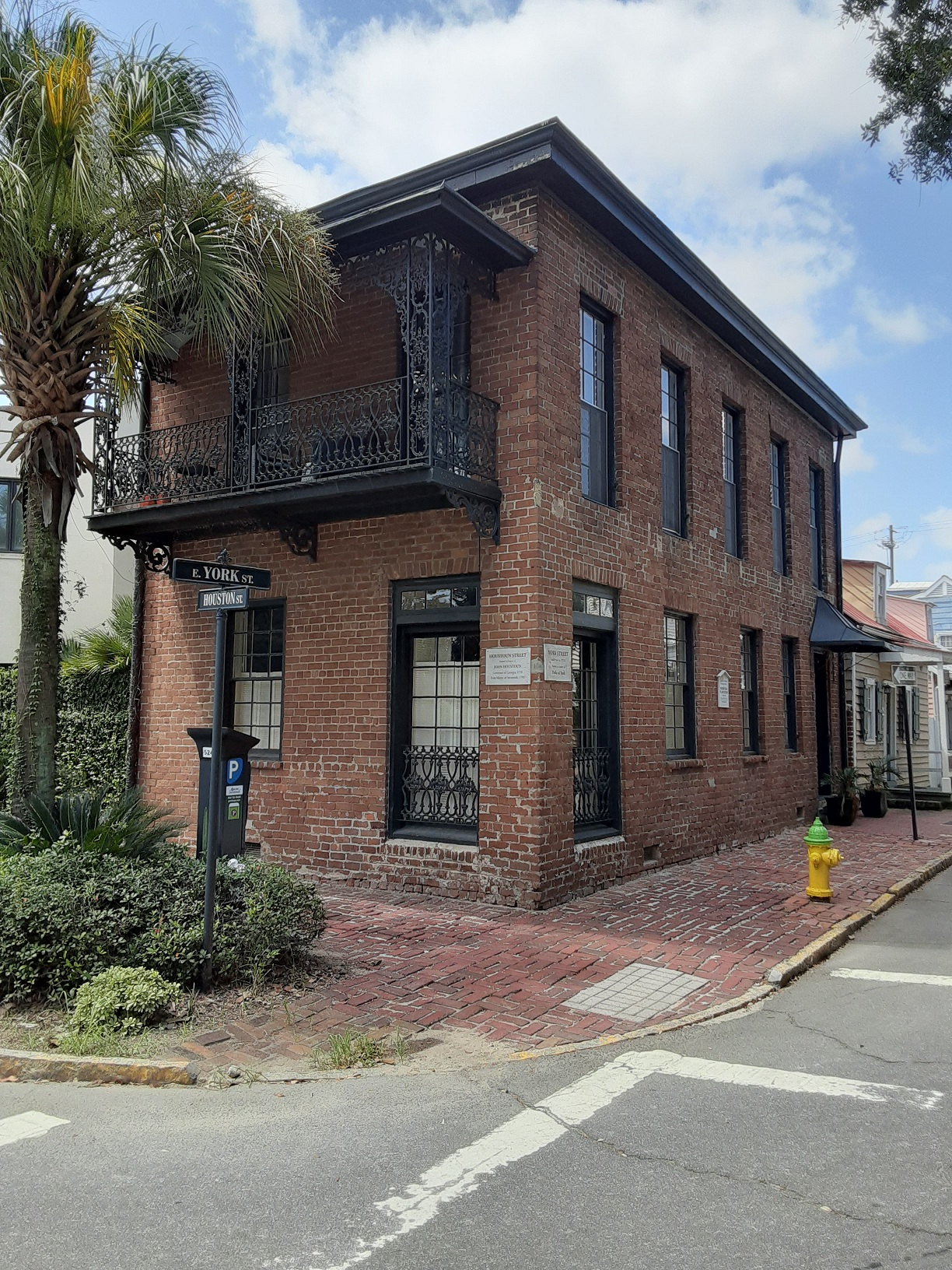
Margaret McDonald House, 521 East York Street

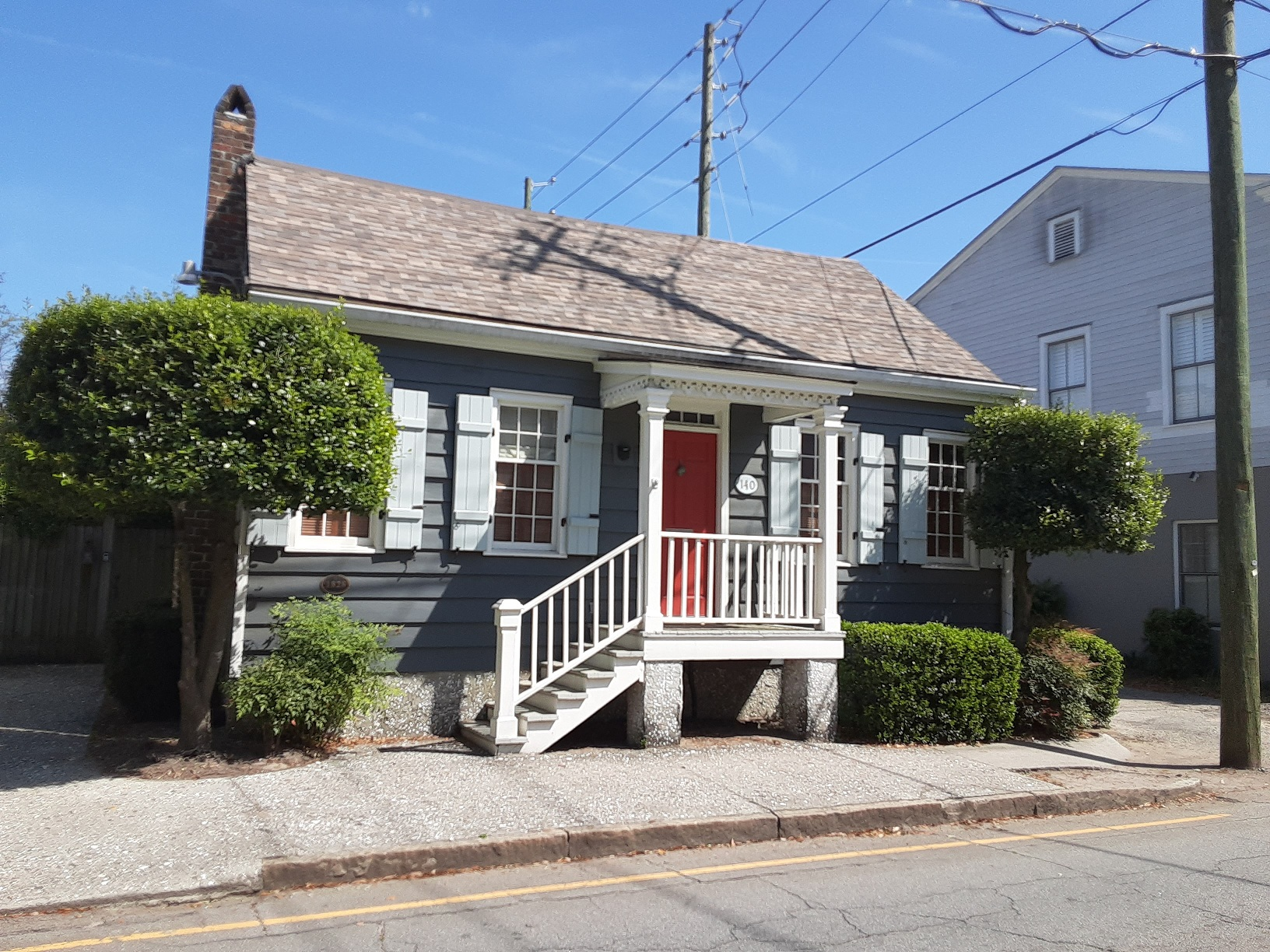
Frederick Heineman Property (2), 140 Price Street

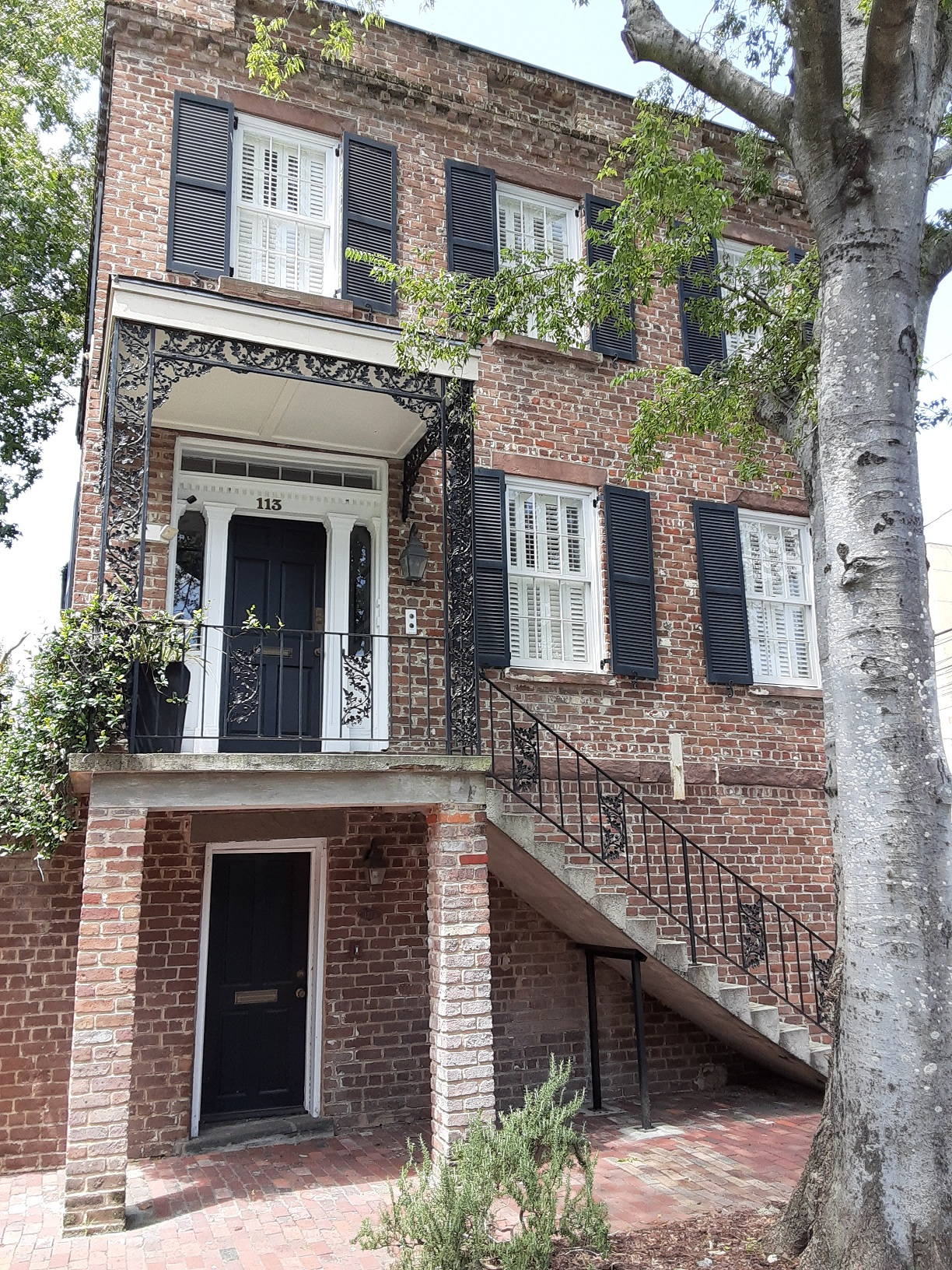
James King House, 113 Houston Street

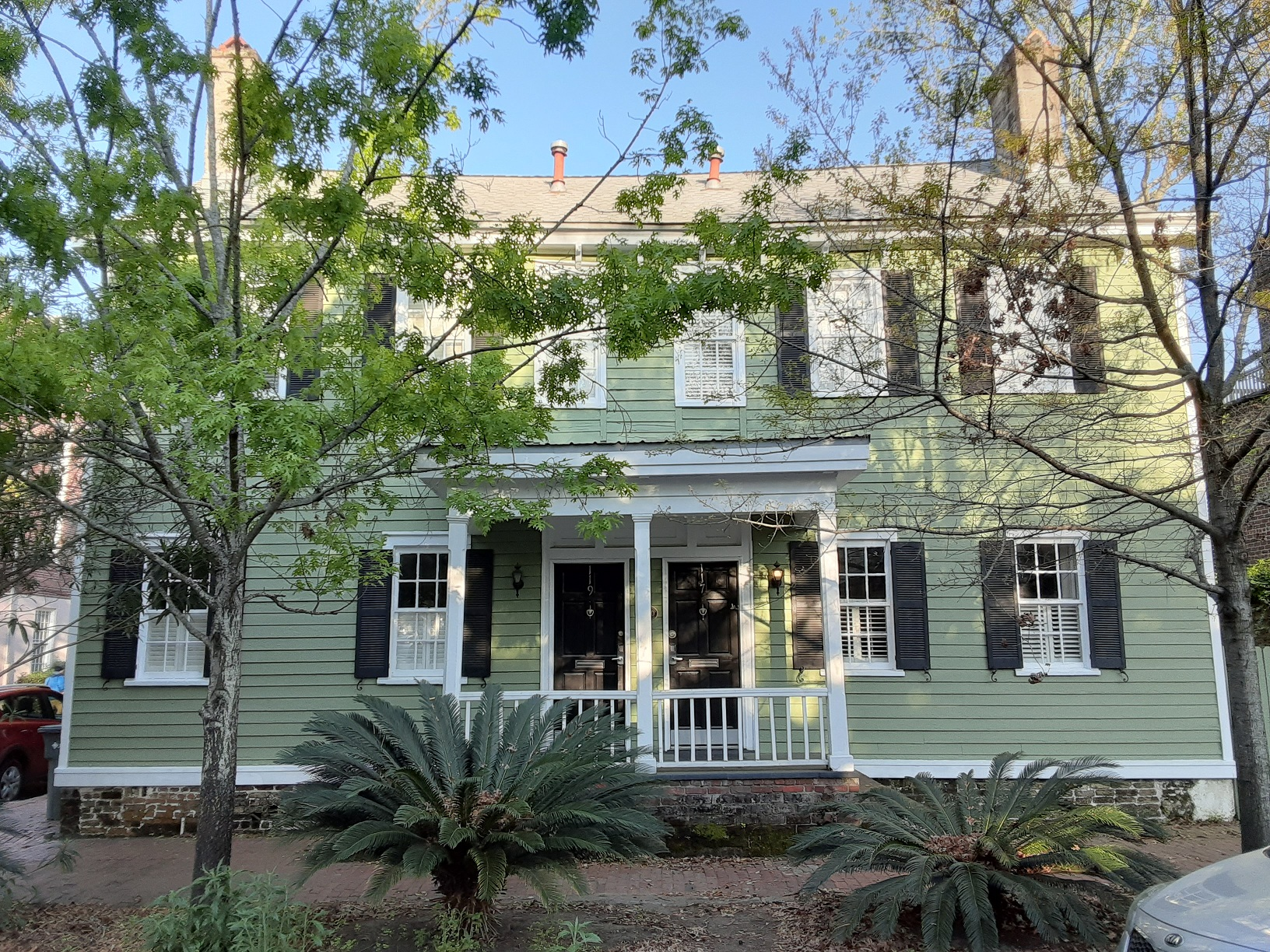
Henry Cunningham House, 117–119 Houston Street

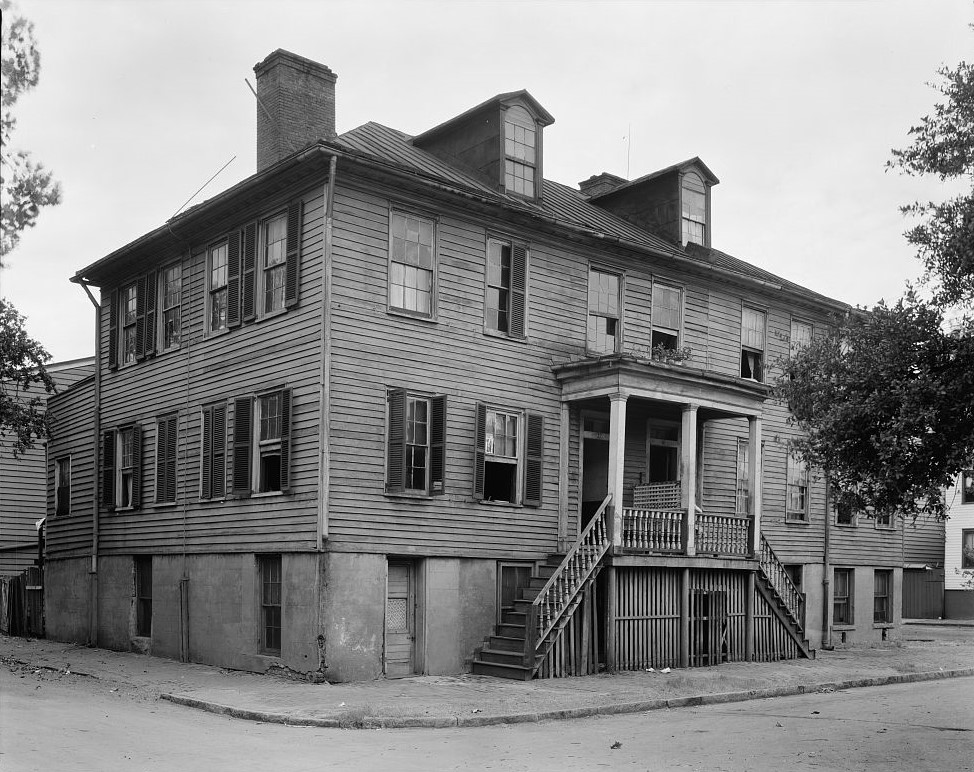
124 Houston Street, a relatively late addition to the square, as it looked during World War II

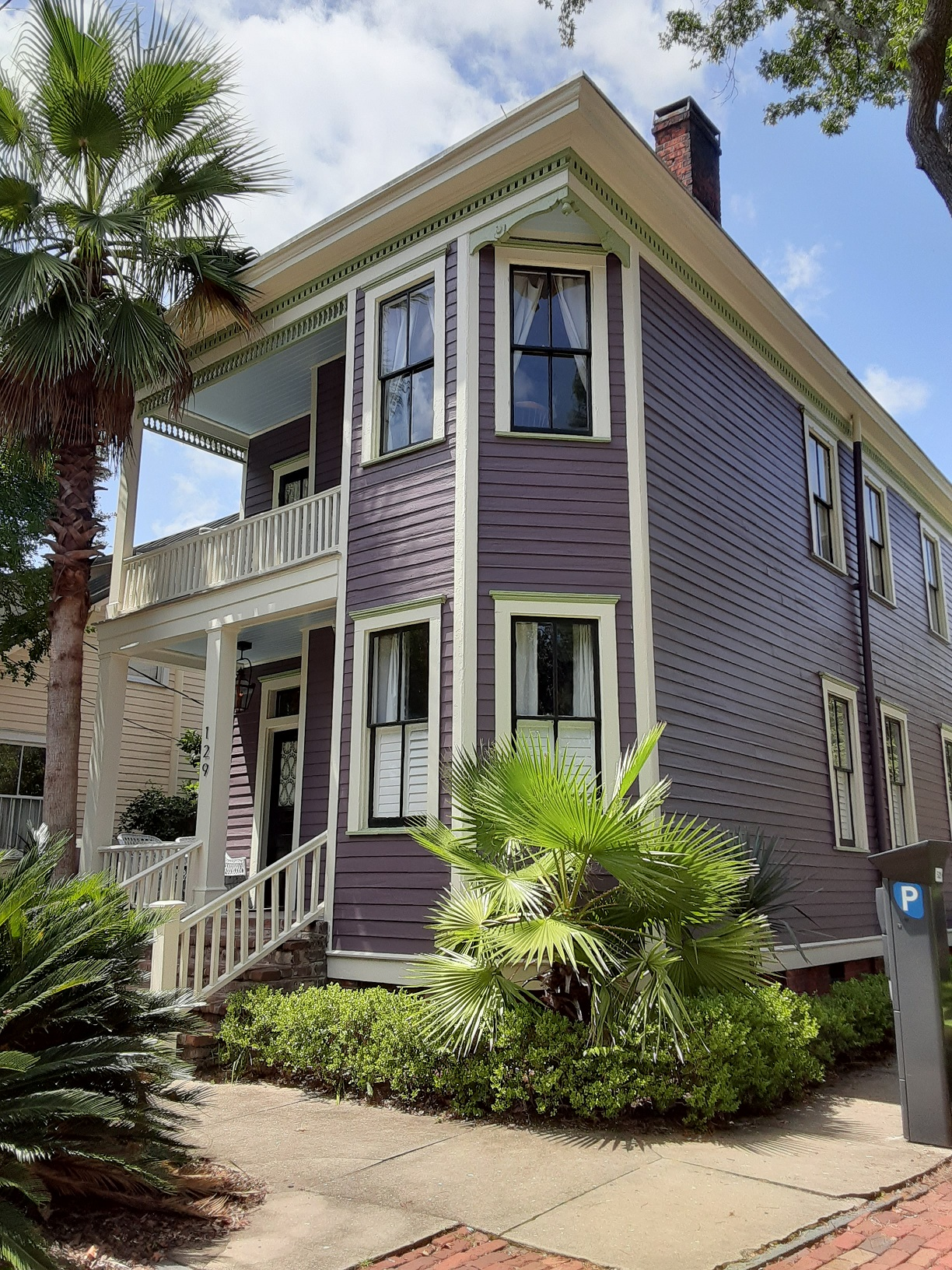
Jeremiah Murphy House, 129 Houston Street

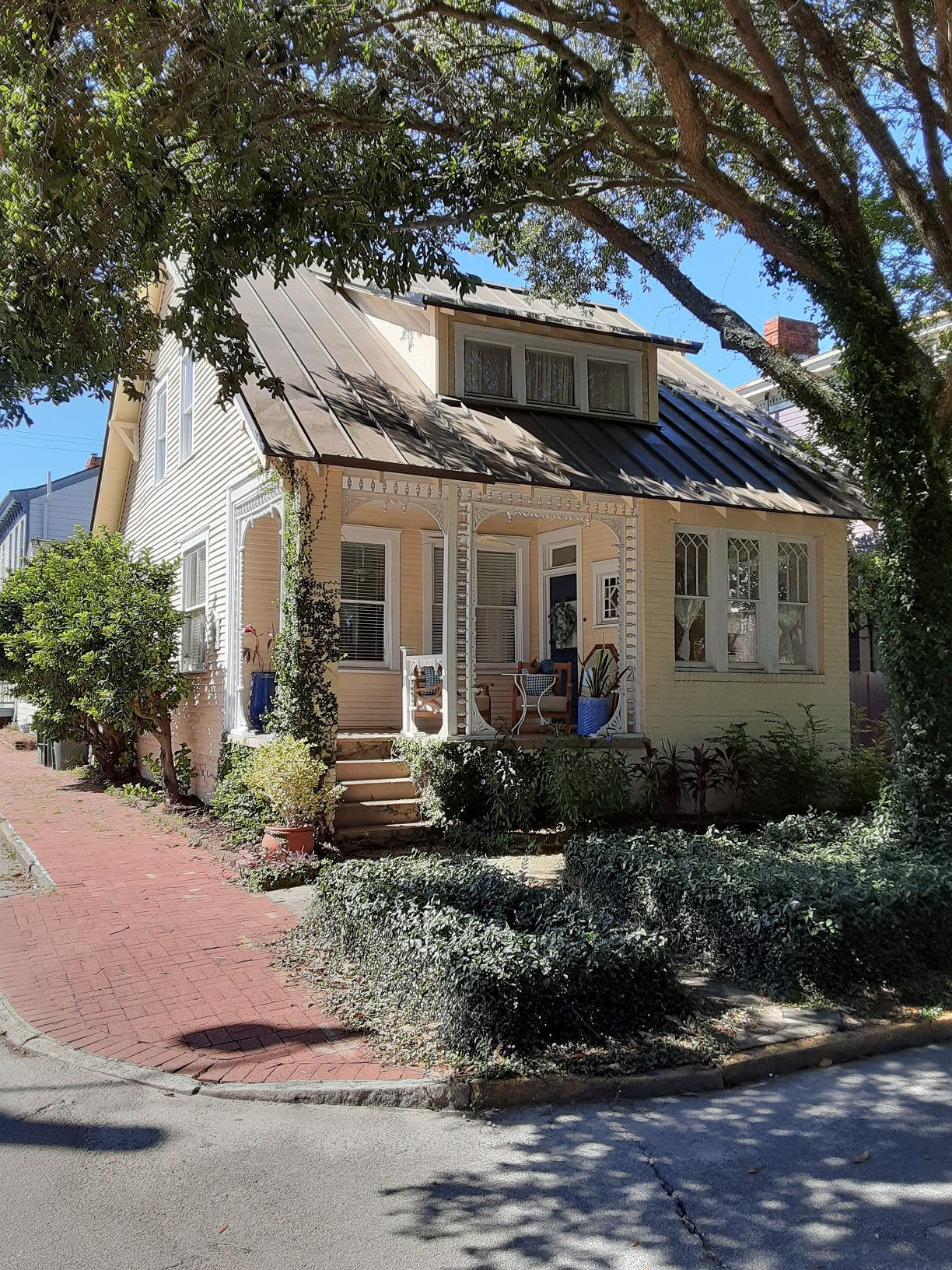
131 Houston Street

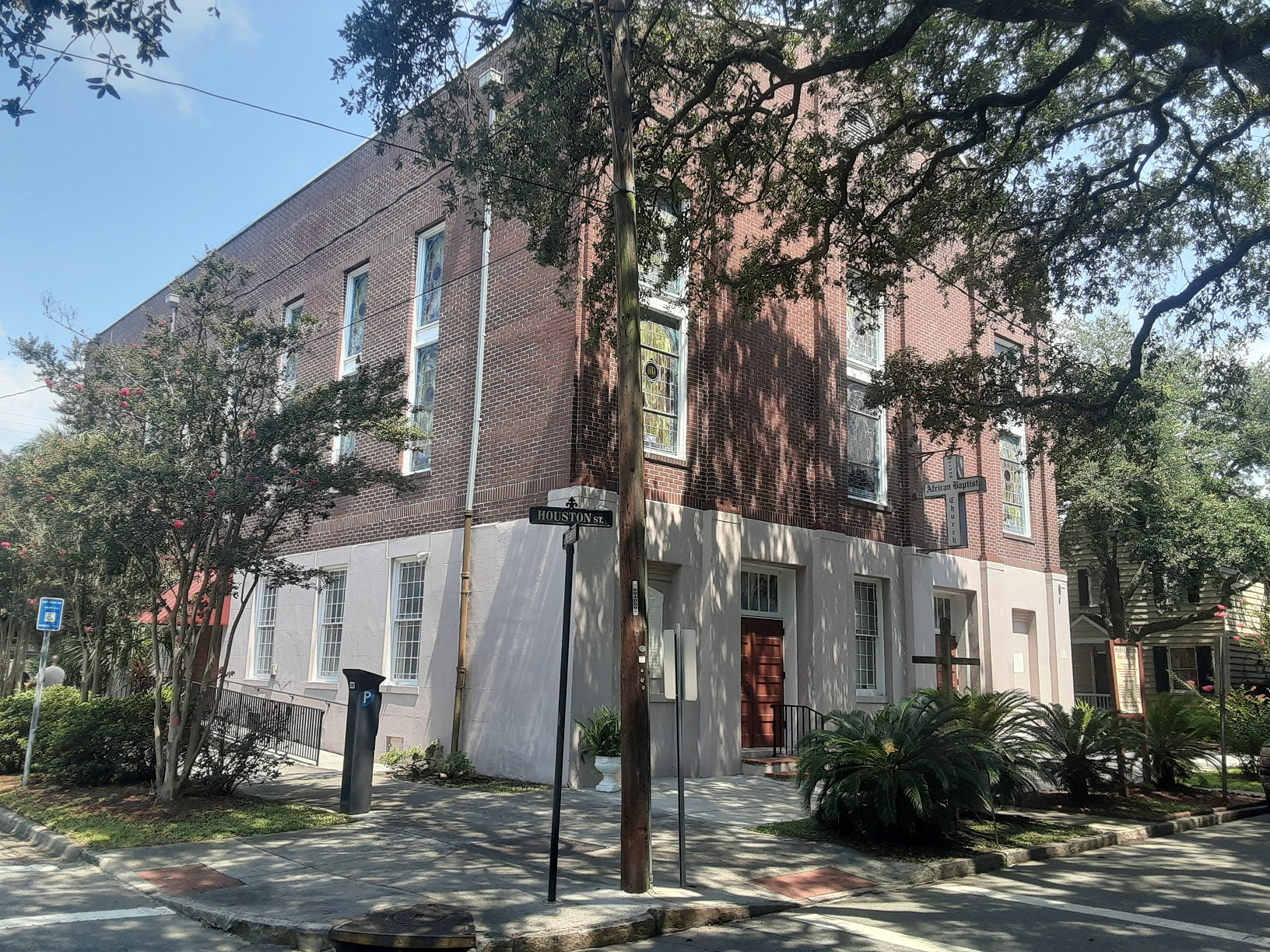
Second African Baptist Church, 123 Houston Street

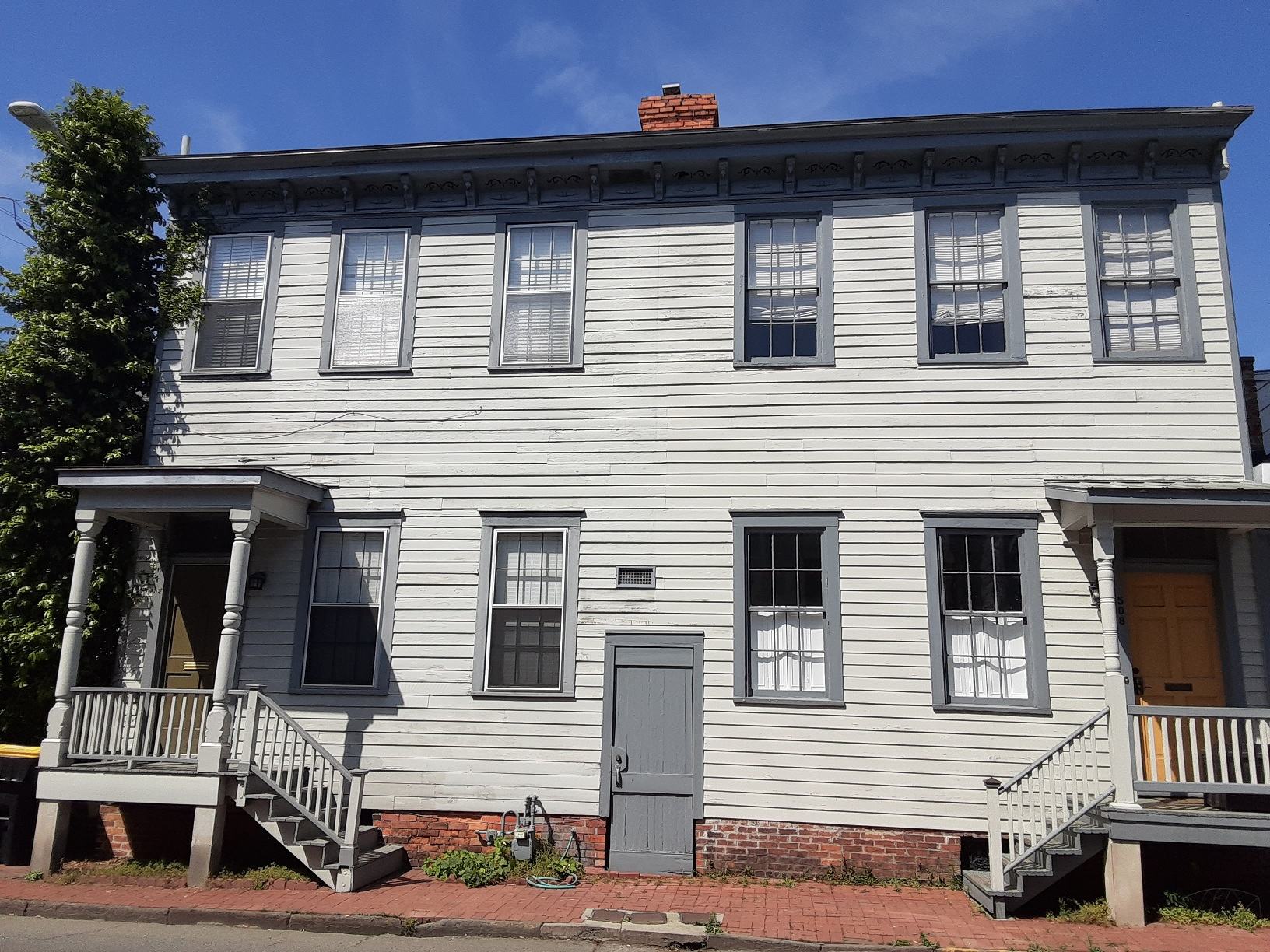
William Herman Duplex, 506–508 East York Street

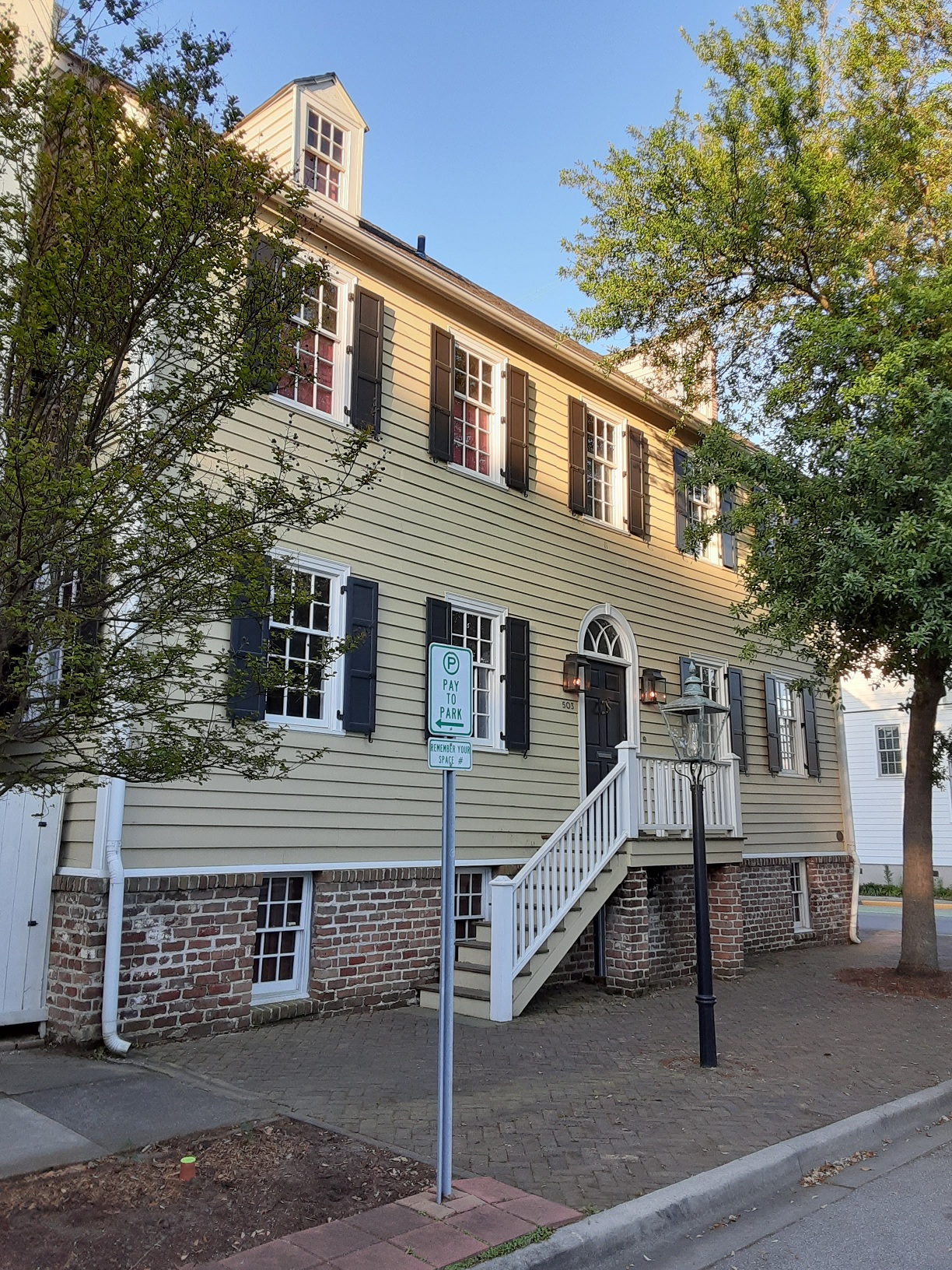
Thomas Williams House, 503 East President Street

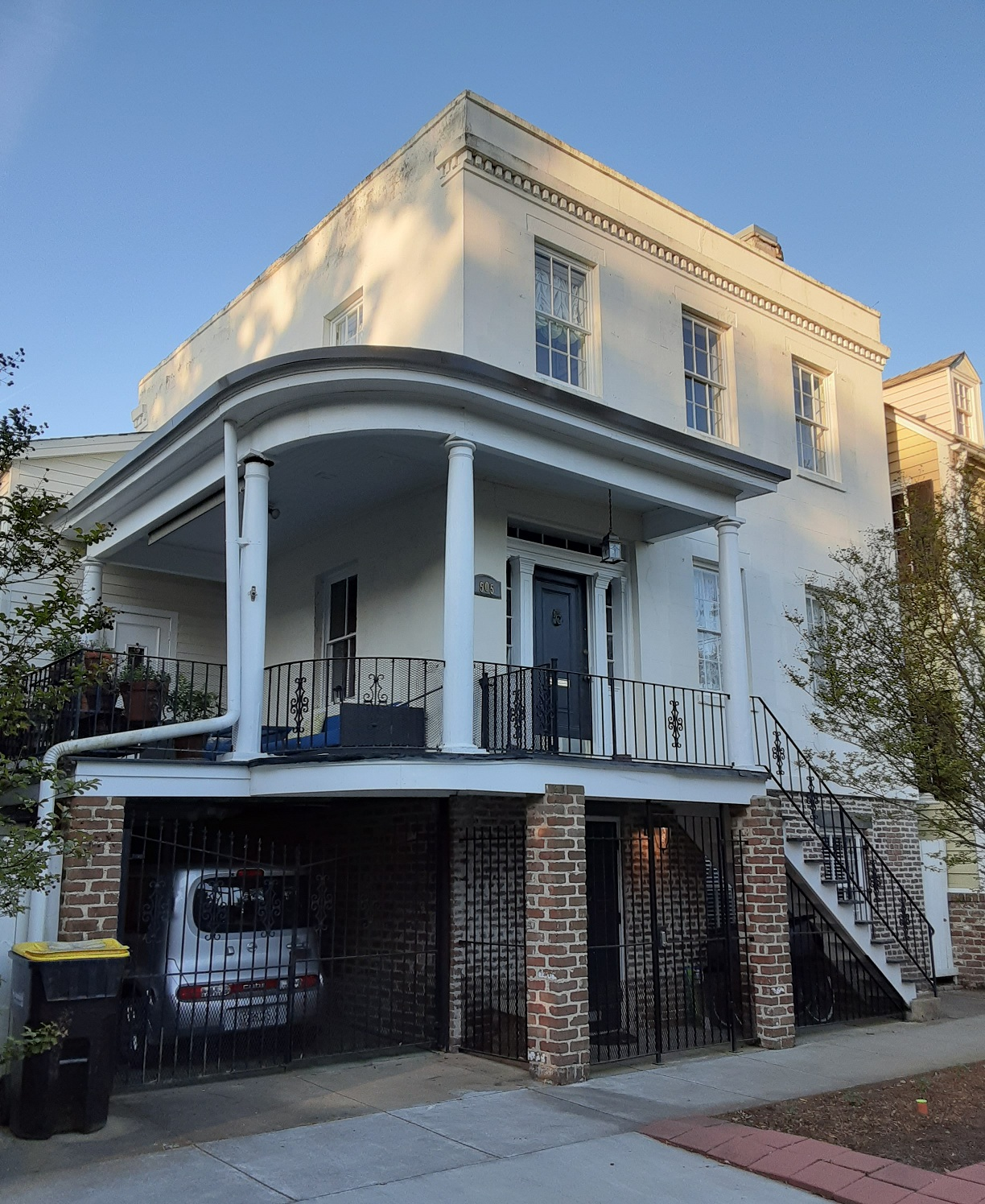
Anthony Mira House, 505 East President Street

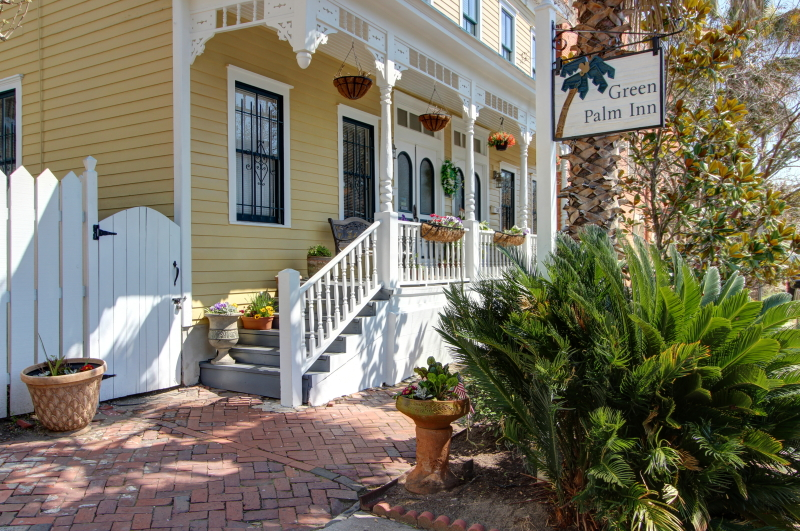
Mary Cullum Property (the Green Palm Inn, as of 2022), 546–548 East President Street

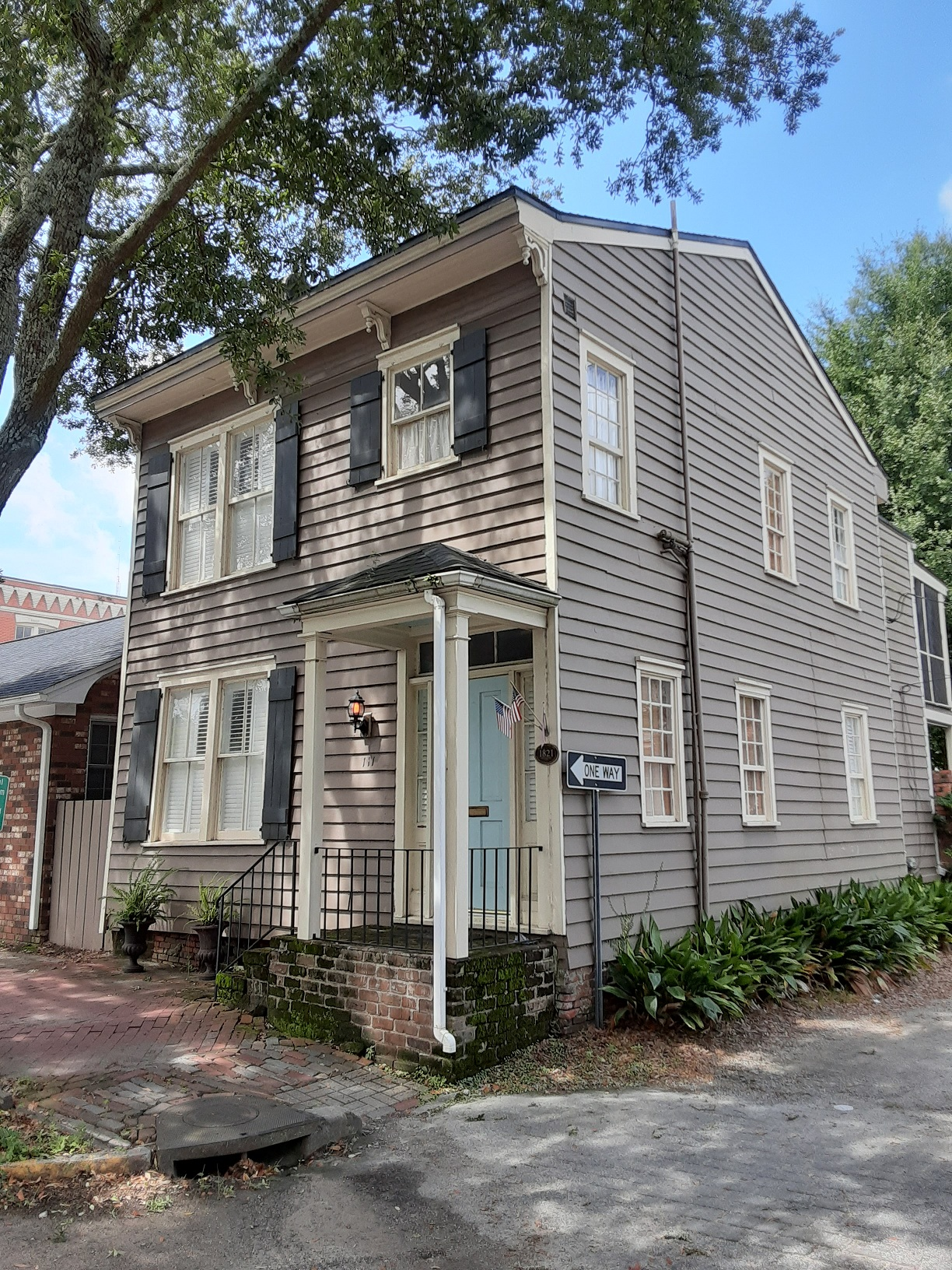
111 East Broad Street

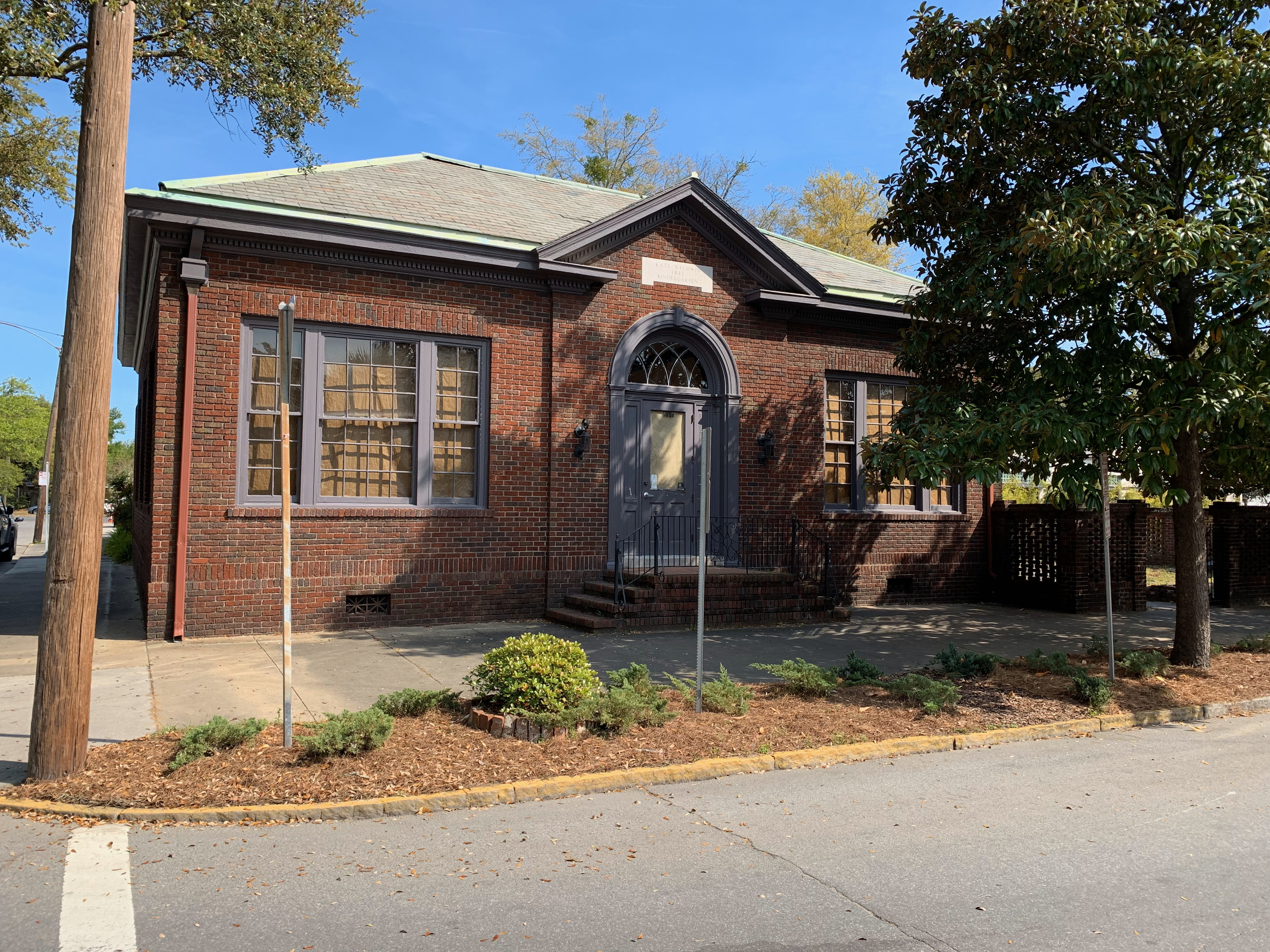
Kate Baldwin Free Kindergarten (former), 134–142 Houston Street

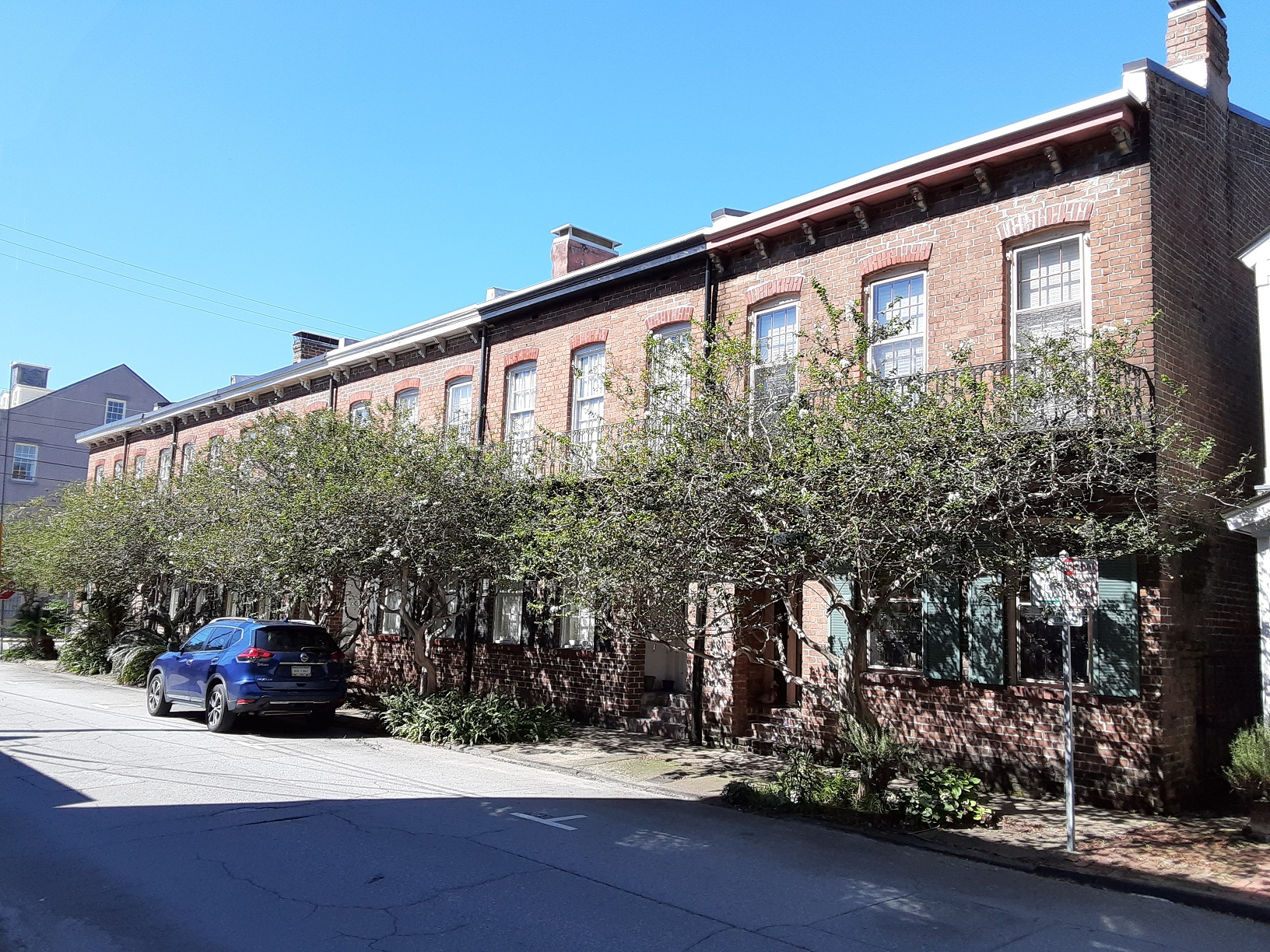
Anderson Row, 502–512 East State Street

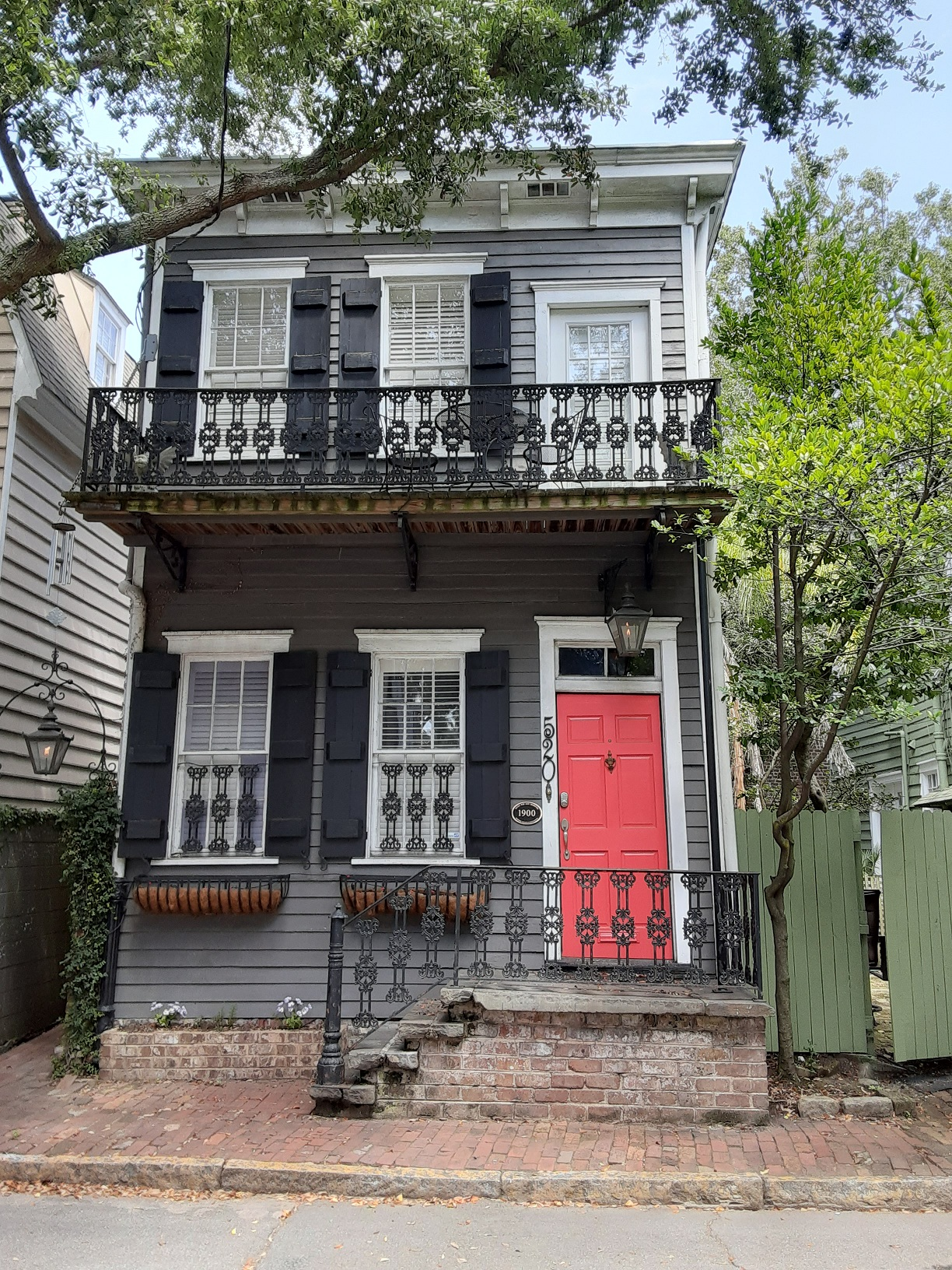
Ann Rossiter House, 520 East State Street

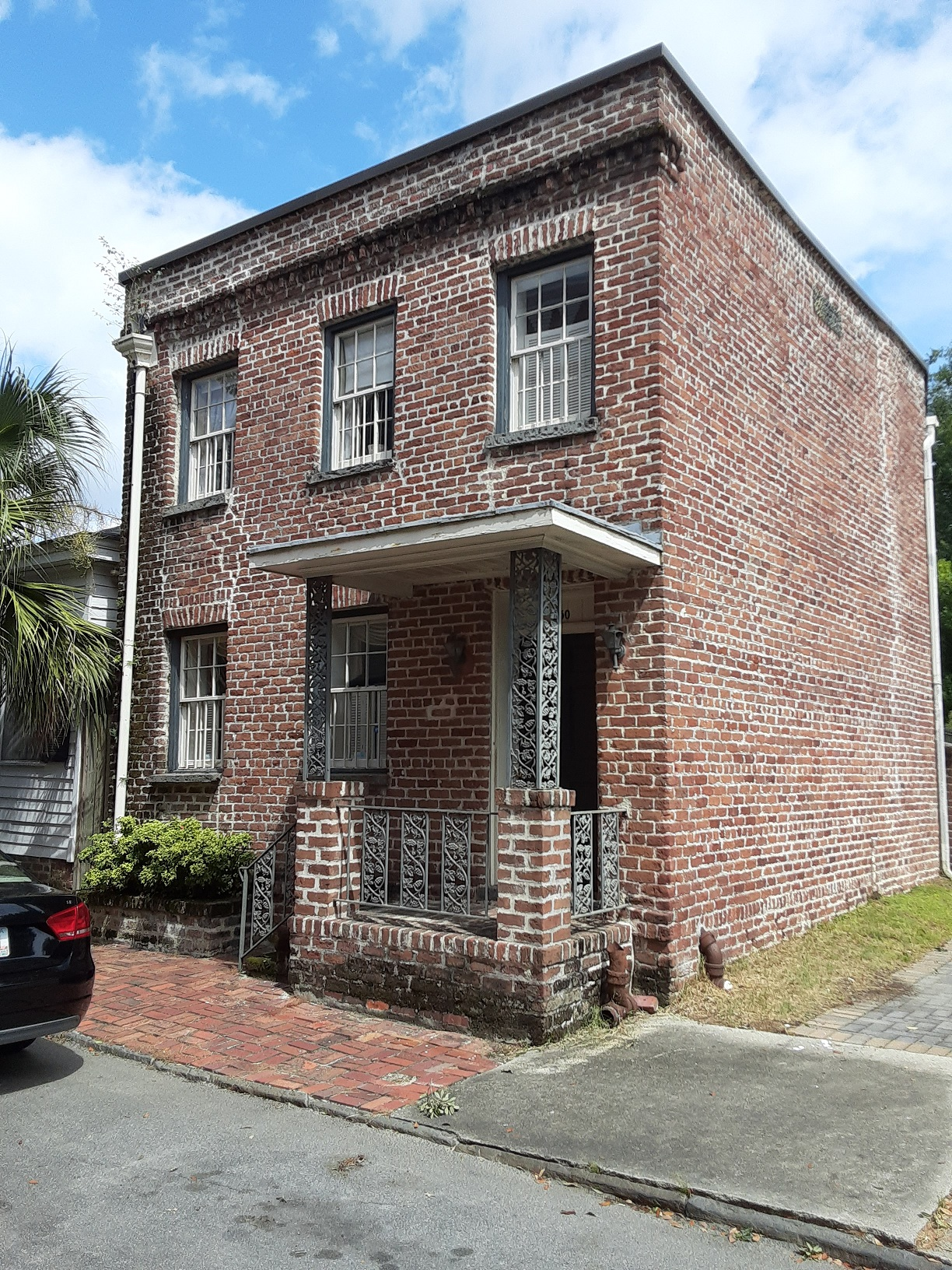
Joseph Burke House, 550 East State Street
