= Savannah Historic District =

Savannah Historic District may refer to:

- Savannah Historic District (Savannah, Georgia), a National Historic Landmark district in Georgia
- Central of Georgia Railroad: Savannah Shops and Terminal Facilities, Savannah, Georgia, a historic district listed on the NRHP in Georgia
- Savannah Victorian Historic District, Savannah, Georgia, listed on the NRHP in Georgia
- Savannah Avenue Historic District, Statesboro, Georgia, listed on the NRHP in Georgia
- Savannah Historic District (Savannah, Tennessee), listed on the NRHP in Tennessee
