= Second African Baptist Church =

Historic church in Georgia, United States

- Second Colored Church (formerly)
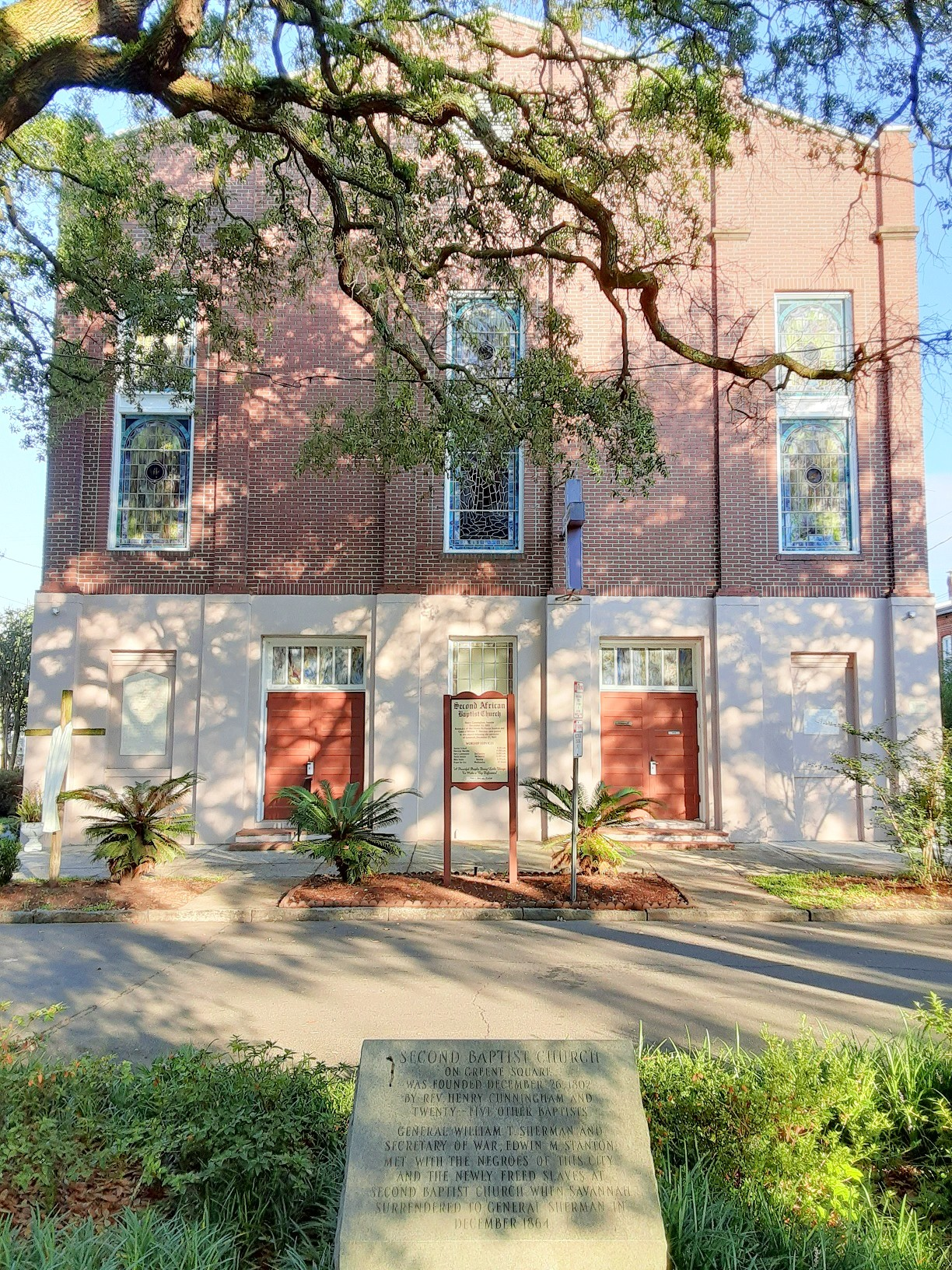
- The building in 2022
- Location: 123 Houston Street; Greene Square; Savannah, Georgia
- Country: United States
- Denomination: Baptist
- Website: www.secondafrican.org

History
- Founded: December 26, 1802 (223 years ago)

Architecture
- Years built: 1926 (100 years ago)

Administration
- Division: National Baptist Convention, U. S. A. Inc.
- Second African Baptist Church
- U.S. Historic district – Contributing property
- Part of: Savannah Historic District (ID66000277)
- Added to NRHP: November 13, 1966

Second African Baptist Church is a church in Savannah, Georgia, United States. Located in the northwestern trust/civic block of Greene Square, at 123 Houston Street, the church was founded on December 26, 1802, twenty-five years after the city's First African Baptist Church, as the First Colored Church. Its first pastor was Rev. Henry Cunningham (1759–1842), who served from 1802 to 1833. The church building was constructed in 1926.

In 1823, the First Colored Church and Second Colored Church were renamed First African Baptist Church and Second African Baptist Church.

In 1864, United States Army general William Tecumseh Sherman issued Special Field Orders No. 15 just outside Savannah. A short time later, general Rufus Saxton publicly spoke to members of this church on the provisions of Sherman's offer, which became known as "forty acres and a mule." Secretary of War Edwin Stanton and Sherman were guests in the church following the surrender of Savannah on December 21, 1864. Just under a century later, in 1963, Dr. Martin Luther King Jr. gave his "I Have a Dream" sermon here, an address he repeated in Washington, D.C., later in the year.

== Affiliations ==
The church is affiliated with the National Baptist Convention, USA, Inc. (the second-largest Baptist organization in the world, after the Southern Baptist Convention), and the General Missionary Baptist Convention of Georgia, Inc.

== See also ==
- Buildings in Savannah Historic District
