= Thomas Pinckney Waring =

American physician (1867–1943)

- Born: February 28, 1867; Savannah, Georgia, U.S.
- Died: January 8, 1943 (aged 75); Savannah, Georgia, U.S.
- Resting place: Bonaventure Cemetery, Savannah, Georgia, U.S.
- Education: Yale Medical College
- Occupation: Physician
- Spouse: Martha "Mattie" Gallaudet Backus (m. 1902–1943; his death)
- Parent(s): James Johnston Waring; Mary Brewton Alston

Thomas Pinckney Waring (February 28, 1867 – January 8, 1943) was an American physician, eminent in Savannah, Georgia, United States. He was described as "the most thoroughly trained and ablest physicians and surgeons in Georgia".

== Early life ==
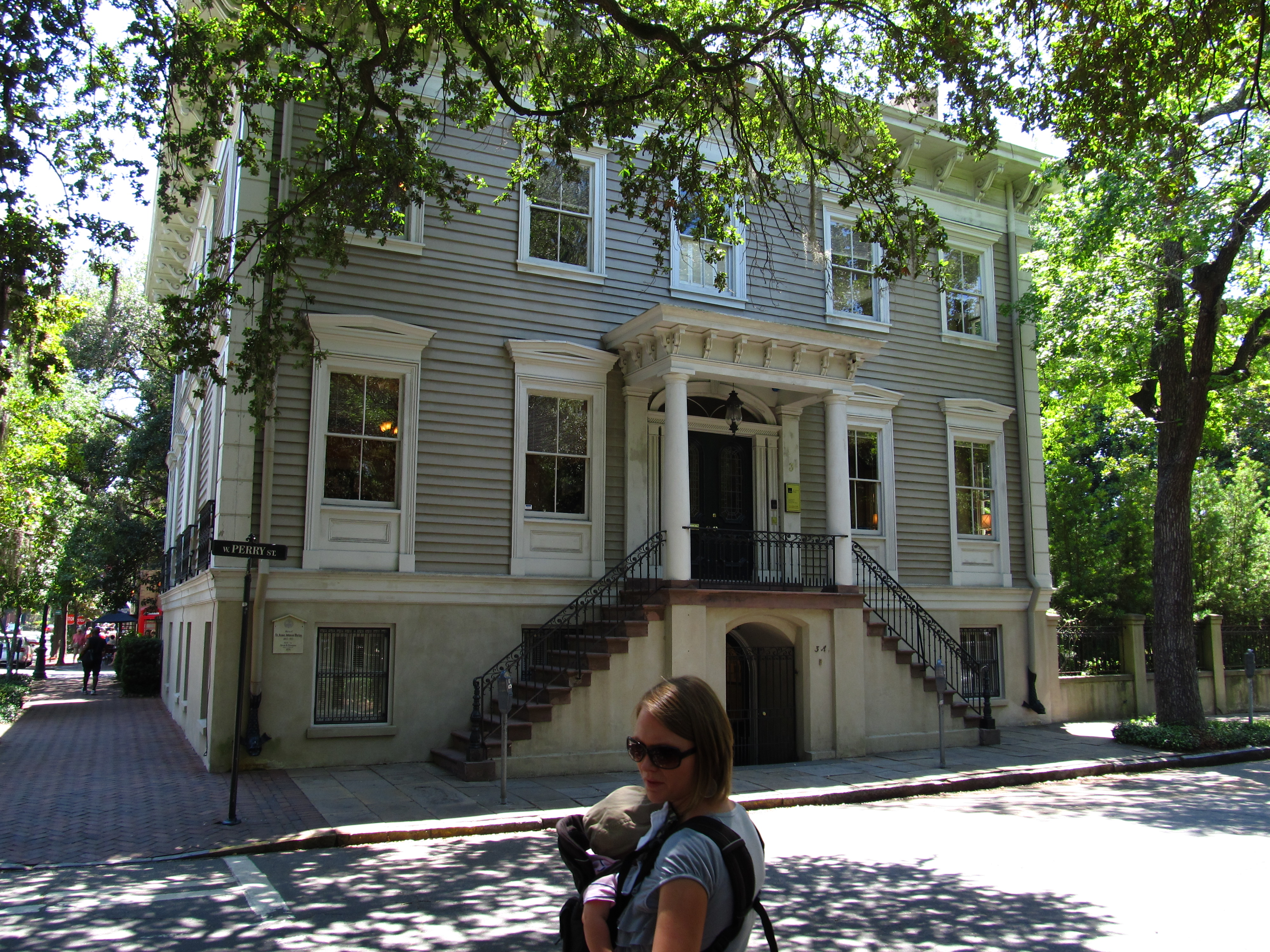
3 West Perry Street in Savannah, Georgia, Waring's family home

Waring was born in 1867 in Savannah, Georgia, to James Johnston Waring, a physician, and Mary Brewton (or Broughton) Alston. His siblings were Annie J. (born 1857), Mary B. (1859–1865), Pinckney Alston (1860), Helen (1862), James J. (1865) and Minna A. (1869). The family lived at 3 West Perry Street in Chippewa Square.

He graduated, in 1889, from Yale Medical College, as did his father and nephew, Joseph Frederick Waring, before studying at Columbia University in New York City. He graduated in 1892, after which he undertook two years as an intern at Bellevue Hospital and one year in Berlin.

== Career ==
In 1895, Waring set up a medical practice in Savannah. He joined the Georgia Medical Society, and later became its president. He was also a Fellow of the American College of Surgeons.

He was head of the Oglethorpe Sanitarium in Savannah. It has been established in 1907 by Dr. John W. Daniel and was located on East Duffy Street.

== Personal life ==
Waring became deputy governor general of the Society of the Colonial Wars.

On Christmas Eve, 1902, Waring married Martha "Mattie" Gallaudet Backus, granddaughter of Savannah historian Charles Seton Henry Hardee, with whom he had three children between 1905 and 1916: daughters Alice and Mary, and son Thomas Jr. Mattie was a pioneer in the kindergarten movement in Georgia.

He was a 32nd Degree Scottish Rite freemason and a member of Savannah's Oglethorpe Club.

== Death ==
Waring died in 1943, aged 75. He was interred in Savannah's Bonaventure Cemetery. He was the oldest practicing member of the Georgia Medical Society at the time of his death. His widow died later the same month and was buried beside him.
