= Joseph Cerveau =

Turkish artist

Joseph Louis Ferman Cerveau
- Born: 1806; Ottoman Empire
- Died: March 24, 1896 (aged 90); Natchez, Mississippi, U.S.

Joseph Louis Firmin Cerveau (commonly known as Firmin Cerveau; 1806 – March 24, 1896) was a 19th-century artist from the Ottoman Empire. His most notable work was a 49-inch-by-27-inch panorama of the city of Savannah, Georgia, in 1837.

== Early life ==
Cerveau was born in İzmir, Ottoman Empire, in 1806. His father, a Frenchman, was a merchant and raised his family in Asia Minor. He was ordered to return to France by the government, but was advised against doing so by a third party, due to the French Revolution. As such, he sailed (in a merchant vessel, the Sultana) across the Mediterranean Sea and continued across the Atlantic Ocean to the United States, arriving in Boston in 1821. The family settled in Philadelphia.

== Career ==
His most noted work is his 1837 panorama of Savannah, Georgia, which is regarded as his "masterpiece." The original version is in the possession of the Georgia Historical Society.

His papier-mâché model of St Mary's Basilica was displayed in the 1893 World's Columbian Exposition in Chicago.

In 1973, Joseph Frederick Waring posthumously released Cerveau's Savannah, which analyzed the buildings visible in the artist's panorama.

== Personal life ==
By 1836, he was living in the United States. He married Mary O'Rourke, of New York, shortly after which they moved to Georgia. He opened a studio to teach drawing and miniature painting, as well as to sketch townscapes and landscapes. One of his efforts hung in the S.S. Savannah, the first steamship to cross the Atlantic.

In 1843, Cerveau and his brother, Auguste Charles Alexandre, filed their naturalization papers in Savannah.

Cerveau became a widower in 1887, at which point he moved to Natchez, Mississippi, to live with his daughter Sophia and her family. The Cerveaus had two other children: John and Francis.

== Death ==
Cerveau died in 1896, aged 90. He was interred in Natchez City Cemetery. His resting place was unmarked for 108 years; in 2004 it was marked with a tombstone saying "Savannah's Artist". Also in 2004, Cerveau's great-great-granddaughter, Jane Millette, portrayed him in the cemetery's annual Angels on the Bluff tour.
