= James Johnston Waring =

American physician (1829–1888)

- Born: August 19, 1829; Savannah, Georgia, U.S.
- Died: January 8, 1888 (aged 58); Savannah, Georgia, U.S.
- Resting place: Laurel Grove Cemetery, Savannah, Georgia, U.S.
- Education: Yale Medical College
- Occupation: Physician
- Spouse: Mary B. Alston (m. 1856)
- Children: 7, including Thomas Pinckney Waring

James Johnston Waring (August 19, 1829 – January 8, 1888) was an American medical doctor.

== Biography ==
Waring was born on August 19, 1829, in Savannah, Georgia, to William Richard Waring and Anne Moody Johnston. His mother died when he was seven; his father when he was 14. He graduated from Yale College in 1850, followed by a master's degree from the University of Pennsylvania two years later.

In early 1853, Waring worked in Dublin, then St Bartholomew's Hospital in London, followed by seven months in Paris. Upon his return to his native land, in 1856, he settled in Washington, D.C. He was elected 1857 Professor of Physiology, and Professor of Obstretics in the National Medical College. In 1859, he was elected surgeon and curator of the Washington Infirmary.

On May 23, 1856, Waring married Mary Alston.

Waring held several academic posts between 1856 and 1860, before his return to his hometown of Savannah in 1861. He was appointed as a surgeon for the Provisional Army of the Confederate States in the Civil War.

In 1868, Waring was expelled from the Medical Society of Savannah for "providing surety on the bonds of people of color who were charged with riotous conduct," a decision that was reversed by the Supreme Court of Georgia. It was found that the Society did no have sufficient cause for the expulsion. Waring rented property on Skidaway Island to black people so that they might learn self-dependence. He was described as a "firm friend of the colored people".

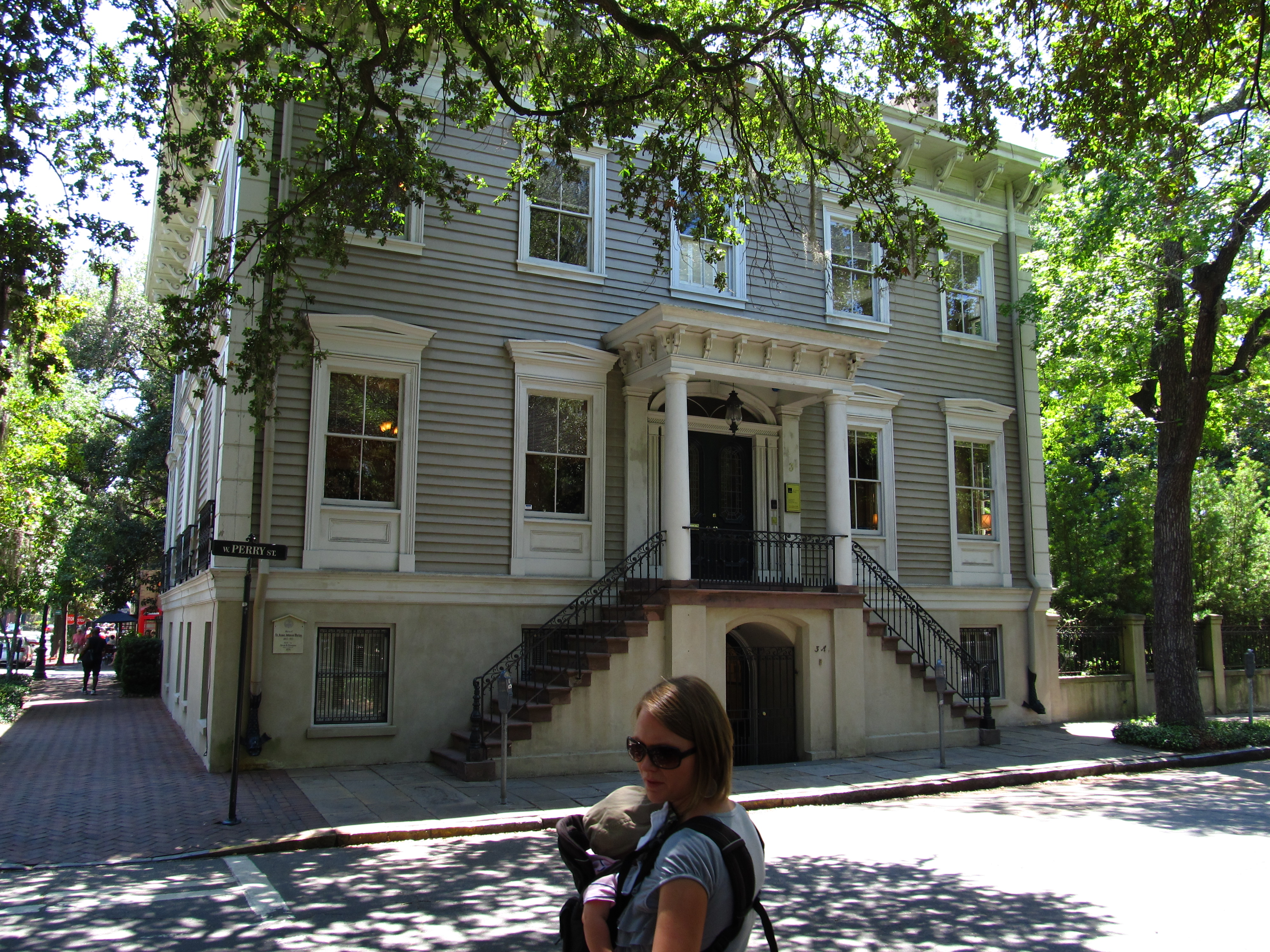
3 West Perry Street in Savannah, Georgia, Waring's family home

Waring was practicing medicine in Savannah in 1870, living with his wife and six of their children on 3 West Perry Street in Chippewa Square. The couple's children were: Annie J. (born 1857), Mary B. (1859–1865), Pinckney Alston (1860), Helen (1862), James J. (1865), Thomas (1867) and Minna A. (1869). Another daughter, Mary, died in 1865.

Also in the 1870s, Mary Magdalene Marshall, a prominent Savannah citizen, appointed Waring in a codicil to her will, making him a trustee of her estate and her granddaughter Mary Marshall Barclay.

When a yellow fever epidemic struck Savannah in 1876, Waring became chairman of a committee of the city government to carry out sanitary reform.

After a long illness, Waring died on January 8, 1888, aged 58. He is interred in Savannah's Laurel Grove Cemetery.
