= Martha Gallaudet Waring =

American educator

- Born: November 25, 1873; Savannah, Georgia, U.S.
- Died: January 27, 1943 (aged 69); Savannah, Georgia, U.S.
- Resting place: Bonaventure Cemetery, Savannah, Georgia, U.S.
- Occupation: Educator
- Relatives: Charles Seton Henry Hardee (grandfather)

Martha Gallaudet "Mattie" Waring (November 25, 1873 – January 27, 1943) was an American educator. She was a pioneer in the kindergarten movement in Georgia.

== Early life ==
Martha Gallaudet Backus was born in 1873 in Savannah, Georgia, to Henry Edward Backus and Alice Neufville Hardee, daughter of Savannah historian Charles Seton Henry Hardee. Her father died in Savannah's 1876 yellow fever epidemic when Backus was three years old. She had one known sibling: brother Henry Linsley Backus (1875–1951).

She was homeschooled by private tutors, and later attended St. Timothy's School, in Stevenson, Maryland, and the Free Kindergarten Training School, in Columbus, Georgia.

== Career ==
Waring remained in Columbus for two years post-graduation as principal of the training school. She held the same position for years in Savannah. She became president of Savannah Kindergarten Club, vice-president of the Kate Baldwin Free Kindergarten, president of the Parent–Teachers' Association of Savannah and president of Bishop Elliott Society of Christ Church.

Waring wrote "Training Children in Language and Literature," a column in the August 18, 1922, edition of The Delta County Independent in Colorado.

Waring's grandfather, Charles Seton Henry Hardee, died in Savannah in 1927, aged 97, while at his desk writing Charles Seton Henry Hardee's Recollections of Old Savannah, the second volume of his memoirs. "His pencil did not drop from his weary fingers. His notebook lay on his table, ready for further recollections of the development of his beloved city," wrote Waring, who had his works published.

== Personal life ==
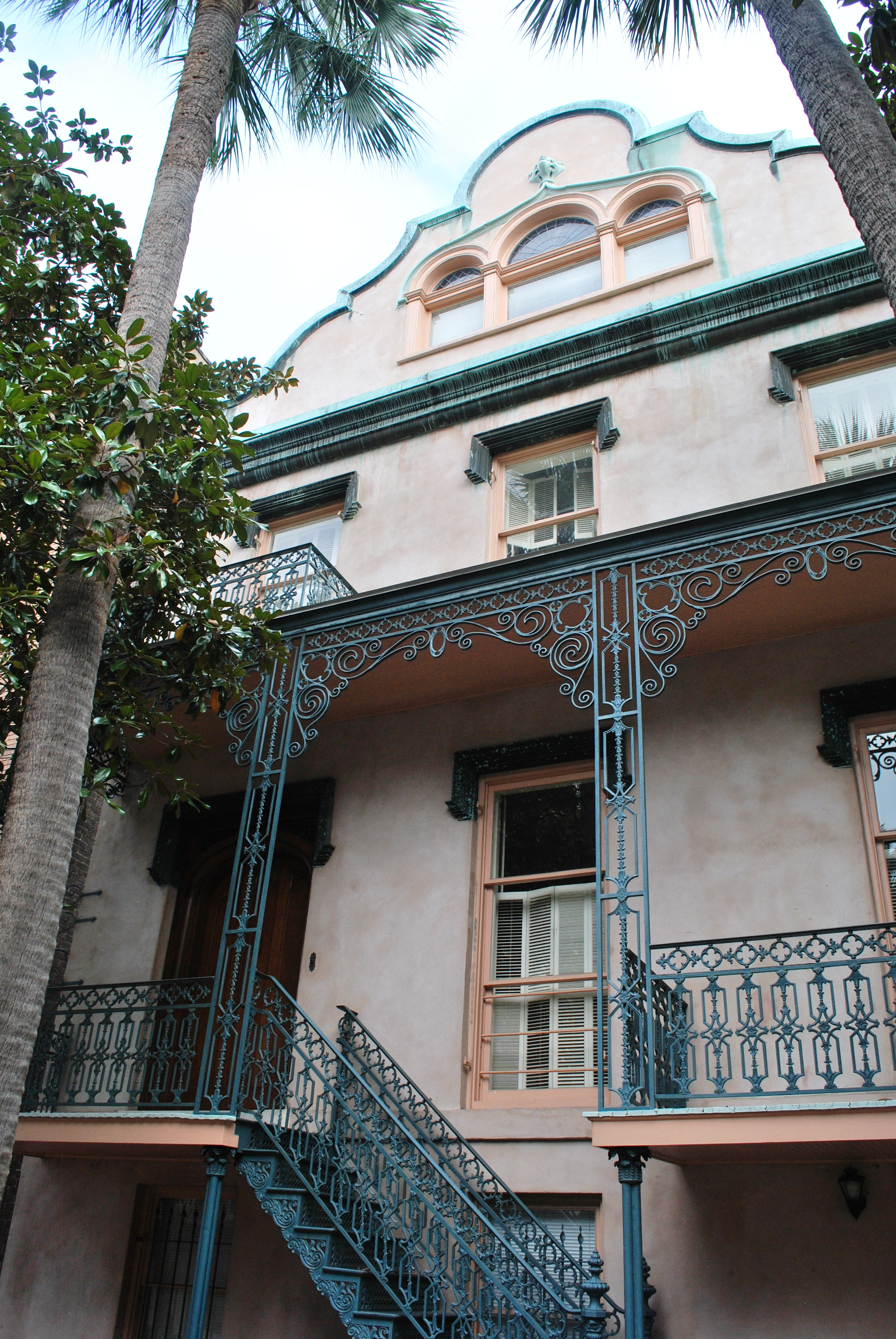
The Waring family home in Savannah

On Christmas Eve, 1902, Backus married Thomas Pinckney Waring, an eminent Savannah physician, with whom she had three children between 1905 and 1916: daughters Alice and Mary, and son Thomas Jr. The family lived at 10 West Taylor Street.

In 1930, Waring published Savannah's Earliest Private Schools: 1733 to 1800 in The Georgia Historical Quarterly.

In 1933, Waring, along with Mary Savage Anderson, Elfrida De Renne Barrow and Elizabeth Mackay Steven, published a 245-page book on Georgia's bicentennial, titled Georgia: A Pageant of Years.

Waring was a member of Savannah's exclusive Married Woman's Card Club.

== Death ==
Waring died in 1943, aged 69. She was interred in Savannah's Bonaventure Cemetery, alongside her husband, who died earlier the same month.
