= Hortense May Orcutt =

American educator (1874–1936)

- Born: October 2, 1874; Conway, Massachusetts, U.S.
- Died: January 21, 1936 (aged 61); Savannah, Georgia, U.S.
- Resting place: Center Cemetery, Whately, Massachusetts
- Occupation: Educator

Hortense May Orcutt (October 2, 1874 – January 21, 1936) was an American educator and businessperson. She was the superintendent of the Kate Baldwin Free Kindergarten for twenty-five years. During her time in the role, the business grew into a popular system of kindergartens and a training school (known as the Normal Department) for kindergarten teachers, with as many as five kindergartens in operation at one time. The network educated approximately four thousand children between 1899 and 1943.

She was regarded as one of the most prominent women of Savannah, Georgia, between her arrival in 1907 and her death in 1936.

== Life and career ==
Orcutt was born in 1874, in Conway, Massachusetts, to William Baker Orcutt and Mary Ella Kingsley. Her mother died when Orcutt was nineteen years old; her father followed four years later.

She trained for kindergarten work at New York City's Ethical Culture School, and after graduating, taught in the school's psychology department.

After moving to Savannah, Georgia, in 1907, she became a member of the Girl Scout Board of Councilors and the city's chapter of the League of Women Voters.

== Death ==
Orcutt died in 1936, aged 61. Her funeral was held at Christ Church in Savannah. She was interred alongside her parents in Center Cemetery in Whately, Massachusetts.

Upon her death, the training school was discontinued, but the Baldwin family continued the East Side Kindergarten, and nine other kindergartens continued under the auspices of the public schools, a church and other organizations.
