= James Oglethorpe Monument =

Monument in Savannah, Georgia

Coordinates: 32°4′32.7″N 81°5′35.4″W

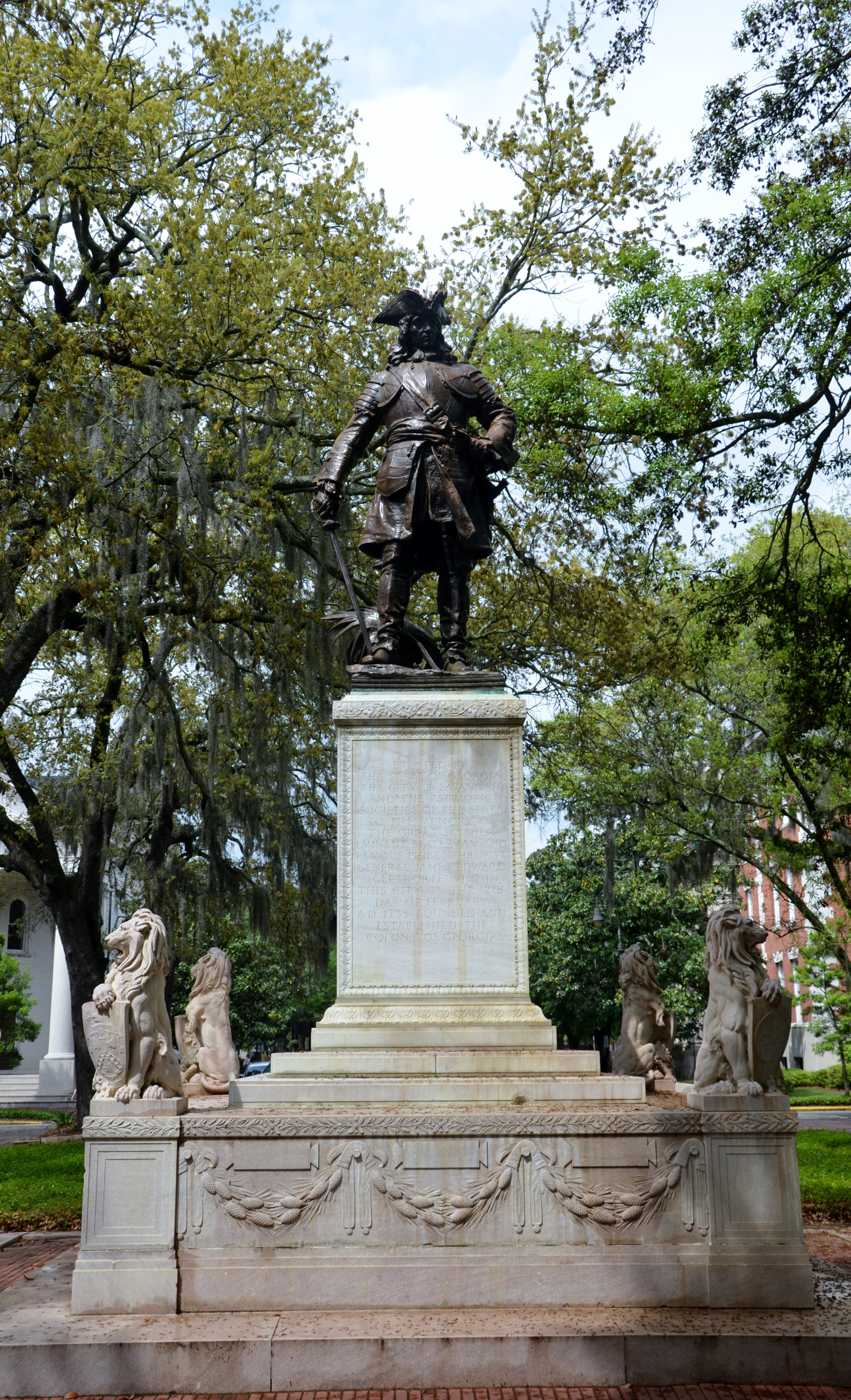
- James Oglethorpe Monument (2015)
- Interactive map of James Oglethorpe Monument
- Location: Chippewa Square, Savannah, Georgia, United States
- Designer: Daniel Chester French; Henry Bacon (pedestal)
- Material: Bronze; Granite
- Height: 9 feet (2.7 m) (statue only)
- Dedicated date: November 23, 1910
- Dedicated to: James Oglethorpe

The James Oglethorpe Monument is a public monument in Chippewa Square, Savannah, Georgia, United States. It honors James Oglethorpe, the founder of the Province of Georgia, who established the city of Savannah in 1733. Efforts to erect the monument began in 1901 and were led by members of several patriotic groups in the city. They were key in securing the necessary U.S. government funds for the monument, which consists of a bronze statue of Oglethorpe designed by Daniel Chester French, atop a large granite pedestal designed by Henry Bacon. It was dedicated in 1910, in a ceremony that attracted several thousand spectators and was attended by several notable government officials.

== History ==
=== Background ===
James Oglethorpe was a soldier and philanthropist who founded the Province of Georgia in 1732, after a charter was granted by the Parliament of Great Britain to the Georgia Trustees. In November of that year, Oglethorpe and a group of over a hundred people set sail from England to colonize the new province, and on February 12, 1733, these settlers established the city of Savannah, Georgia, at Yamacraw Bluff on the Savannah River. Oglethorpe was directly involved in the colony's growth over the next several years, and he led the colony's defenses during the War of Jenkins' Ear against the Spanish Empire, which began in 1739. In 1742, forces under Oglethorpe's command successfully repelled the Spanish invasion of Georgia, and the following year, Oglethorpe led an unsuccessful attack on the Spanish settlement of St. Augustine. Following this, Oglethorpe was called to return to England, where he eventually died in 1785.

=== Erection ===
On May 18, 1901, the Oglethorpe Monument Association was granted a charter by the Superior Court of Chatham County. The association was founded with the goal of raising funds and coordinating efforts between several patriotic groups for the erection of a monument honoring Oglethorpe in Savannah. The association was made up of six representatives each from four patriotic groups: The Georgia Society of Colonial Dames of America, the Sons of the Revolution, the Daughters of the American Revolution, and the Society of Colonial Wars. The association held its first meeting on November 28, 1902, and by 1905, it had raised approximately $5,000.

That summer, the president of the Colonial Dames urged state representatives from Chatham County to secure aid for the monument from the Georgia General Assembly, and on July 12, they introduced a joint resolution to the Georgia House of Representatives to provide for the erection of the monument. On August 10, the resolution passed through the appropriations committee recommending $15,000 to be allocated for the monument's erection. The resolution was voted down and reconsidered several times into the next year in the General Assembly. Finally, on August 13, an amended version of the bill was approved by the House of Representatives, and was approved by the Georgia State Senate two days later. The resolution was then signed into law by Georgia Governor Joseph M. Terrell. An amendment added to the resolution on August 2, 1906, stipulated that the monument would be erected in Chippewa Square, which was state property. The state government appropriated the $15,000 allocation in half increments between 1907 and 1908.

Following the resolution's passage, the governor assembled a commission of seven people to oversee the project. In fall 1906, the commission selected sculptor Daniel Chester French, who at the time was associated with the architect Henry Bacon, to design the monument. French designed the statue of Oglethorpe, while Bacon was responsible for the design of the pedestal. Several years later, the two would collaborate to design the Lincoln Memorial in Washington, D.C. In designing the statue, French decided to portray Oglethorpe as a military commander, and he drew on many portraits of Oglethorpe to ensure an accurate portrayal. On May 10, 1909, several commission members appeared before the city government of Savannah and petitioned for $15,000 in additional funding for the monument, having realized shortly before that the cost for the monument could not be covered by then-available funds. The government approved the request and additional funds were raised by the patriotic groups. The total cost of the monument was $38,000. In 1910, two busts of Confederate States Army generals Francis S. Bartow and Lafayette McLaws were removed from Chippewa Square to make way for the Oglethorpe monument. These busts were relocated to near the Confederate Monument (now the Civil War Memorial) in Forsyth Park.

=== Dedication ===
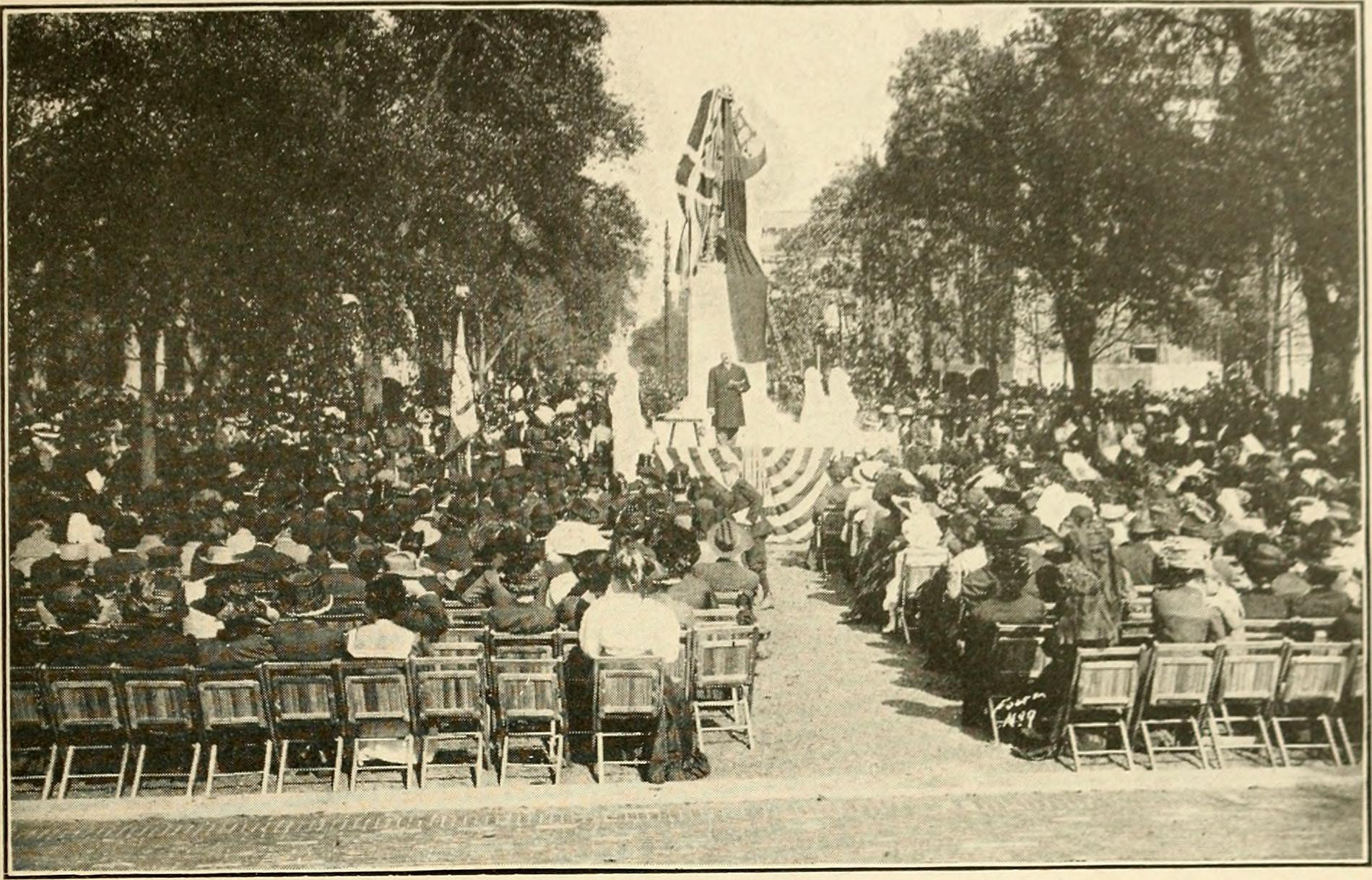
The monument's dedication ceremony

The monument was unveiled on November 23, 1910. Prior to its unveiling, it was covered by the flags of Georgia and England. The ceremony was a large event attended by many notable individuals, including Georgia Governor Joseph M. Brown, Alabama Governor B. B. Comer, Senators Augustus O. Bacon and Joseph M. Terrell, Representative Charles G. Edwards, and Chancellor David C. Barrow of the University of Georgia, among others. Multiple military companies and thousands of spectators were also in attendance. The invocation for the monument was given by Bishop Frederick F. Reese of the Episcopal Diocese of Georgia. Following this, multiple addresses were made, including one by A. Mitchell Innes, then-acting British ambassador. Following these addresses, French and the chairman of the commission led Brown and J. J. Wilder, the president of the Society of Colonial Dames of America, to the monument, where the two of them removed the flags and officially unveiled the monument.

On the next day, Thanksgiving, the Georgia Bulldogs and the Auburn Tigers played their annual football rivalry game in a field near Chippewa Square as part of further celebrations for the monument. The governors of Georgia and Alabama (where Auburn University is located) were among the 5,000 people in attendance.

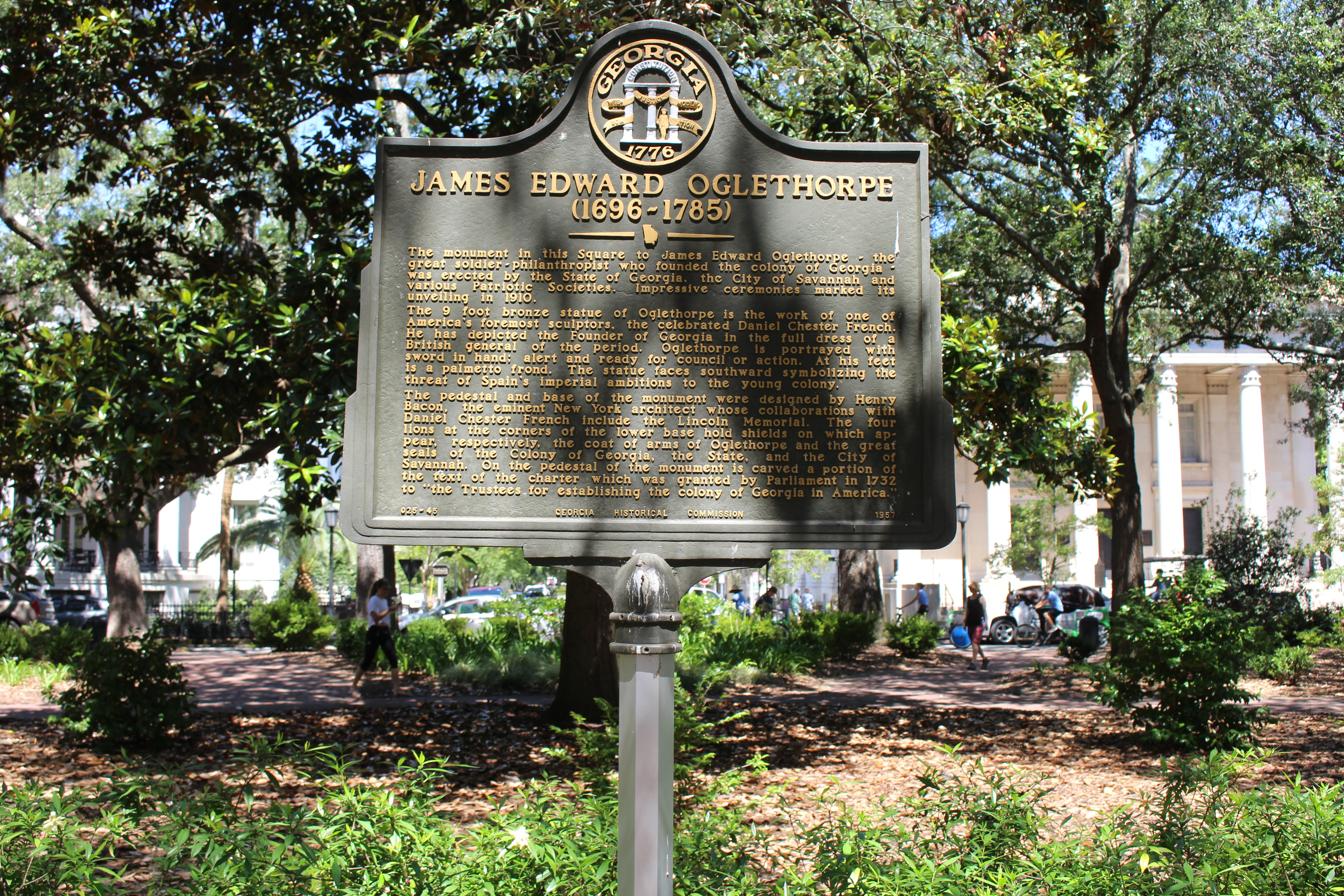
Georgia historical marker for the monument

In 1957, the Georgia Historical Commission erected a Georgia historical marker near the monument, describing its history.

== Design ==
The statue of Oglethorpe is made of bronze and stands 9 feet (2.7 m) tall. Oglethorpe is depicted as wearing a contemporary military uniform from the 1700s, including a cuirass, waistcoat, boots, and a tricorn hat. Additionally, he is wearing a wig similar to one he is depicted as having worn. Oglethorpe holds a sword in his hand, and a palmetto frond is next to his feet. The statue faces towards the south, which, according to the Georgia Historical Society, symbolizes "the threat of Spain’s imperial ambitions to the young colony."

The pedestal for the statue is made of pink-gray marble and was designed in the Italian Renaissance style. The pedestal itself rests on a large square base that has four lion rampants, one on each corner. Each lion is holding a shield that depicts Oglethorpe's personal coat of arms and the seals of the state of Georgia, the colony of Georgia, and the city of Savannah. The base is further decorated with garlands. Part of the original charter granted to Oglethorpe by Parliament is inscribed on the monument, while on the south side of the monument is inscribed the following:

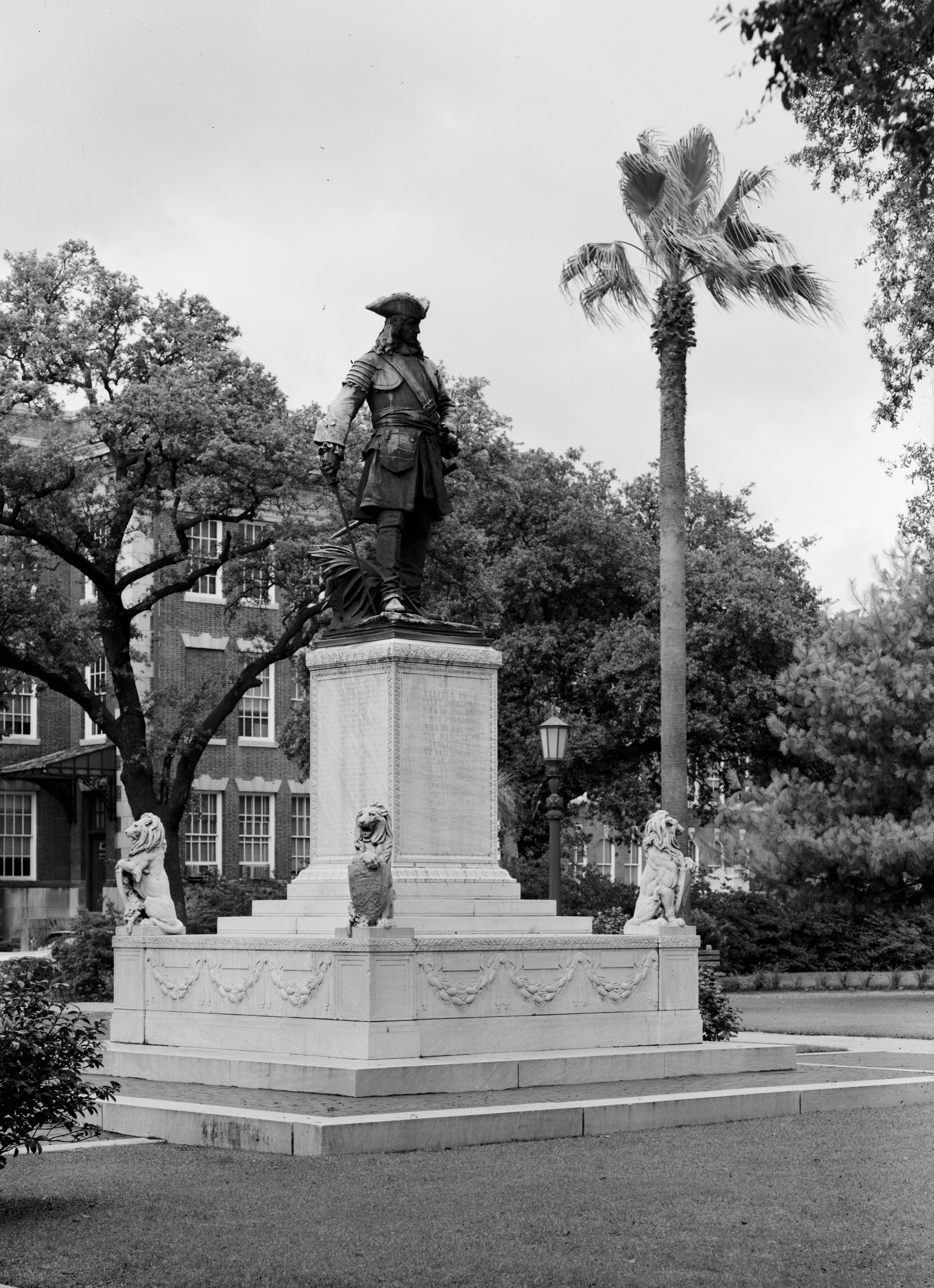
Historic American Buildings Survey picture of the monument

Erected by
The State of Georgia
The City of Savannah,
And the Patriotic
Societies of the State
To the Memory of
The Great Soldier
Eminent Statesman, and
Famous Philanthropist,
General James Edward Oglethorpe who in
This City on the 12th
Day of February
A. D. 1733 Founded and
Established the
Colony of Georgia

== See also ==
- 1910 in art
- Public sculptures by Daniel Chester French

== Bibliography ==
- Carlisle, Rodney; Carlisle, Loretta (2019). Savannah in History: A Guide to More Than 75 Sites in Historical Context. Globe Pequot Press. ISBN 978-1-68334-028-7 – via Google Books.
- Garbin, Patrick (2008). About Them Dawgs!: Georgia Football's Memorable Teams and Players. The Scarecrow Press. ISBN 978-0-8108-6040-7 – via Google Books.
- "A History of the Erection and Dedication of the Monument to General James Edward Oglethorpe". Collections of the Georgia Historical Society. VII (II). Georgia Historical Society: 1–53. 1911 – via Google Books.
- "James Edward Oglethorpe (1696-1785)". Georgia Historical Society. June 16, 2014a. Archived from the original on August 15, 2020.
- "Landing of Oglethorpe and the Colonists". Georgia Historical Society. June 16, 2014b. Archived from the original on July 29, 2020.
- Griner, Ken (November 10, 2017). "UGA's handler remembers chomp on the plains". WTOC-TV. Archived from the original on November 11, 2017.
- Jackson, Edwin L. (December 2, 2003). "James Oglethorpe (1696-1785)". New Georgia Encyclopedia. Archived from the original on November 8, 2020.
- Knight, Lucian Lamar (1913). Georgia's Landmarks, Memorials and Legends. Vol. I. Byrd Printing Company – via Google Books.
- Knight, Lucian Lamar (1917). A Standard History of Georgia and Georgians. Vol. II. Lewis Publishing Company. ISBN 978-5-87666-730-4 – via Google Books.
- Komanecky, DeAnn (June 18, 2020). "Family of Confederate leader offers to purchase vandalized Savannah memorial". Athens Banner-Herald. Gannett. Archived from the original on December 6, 2020.
- Spalding, Phinizy; Jackson III, Harvey H., eds. (1989). Oglethorpe in Perspective: Georgia's Founder After Two Hundred Years. University of Alabama Press. ISBN 978-0-8173-5345-2 – via Google Books.
