= Cerveau's Savannah =

1973 book by Joseph Frederick Waring

- Author: Joseph Frederick Waring
- Language: English
- Publisher: Georgia Historical Society
- Publication date: 1973 (53 years ago)
- Publication place: United States
- Media type: Hardback book
- Pages: 87
- OCLC: 1293418

Cerveau's Savannah is a book by Joseph Frederick Waring. Published in 1973 by the Georgia Historical Society, the book is named for Joseph Cerveau, the artist responsible for the panoramic tempera painting of Savannah, Georgia, completed in 1837, which Waring dissected for the book. He estimated the painting was done in May, judging by the trees being in full leaf and blooming magnolias being visible on East Bryan Street. It is regarded as Cerveau's finest work.

In the painting, undertaken from the now-demolished City Exchange building, Savannah is estimated to be around 1 mile (1.6 km) wide and .75 miles (1.21 km) deep, from Bay Street to Liberty Street. Cerveau omitted the northern portion of the city. The painting was stitched into the back of the book in a smaller form, "the better for the reader to unfold and gaze at while reading and turning the pages," wrote The Atlanta Constitution.

The book has an abrupt ending, due to Waring's death in 1972, aged 69.
