= Joseph Frederick Waring (scholar) =

American scholar (1902–1972)

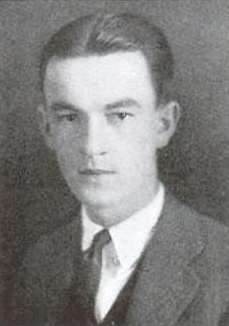
- Waring pictured around 1920
- Born: September 12, 1902; Savannah, Georgia, U.S.
- Died: April 8, 1972 (aged 69); Savannah, Georgia, U.S.
- Occupation: Scholar

Joseph Frederick Waring (September 12, 1902 – April 8, 1972) was an American scholar, preservationist and author. A Yale College graduate, he went on to teach at several schools, including over thirty years at the Western Reserve Academy. He also wrote three books.

== Life and career ==
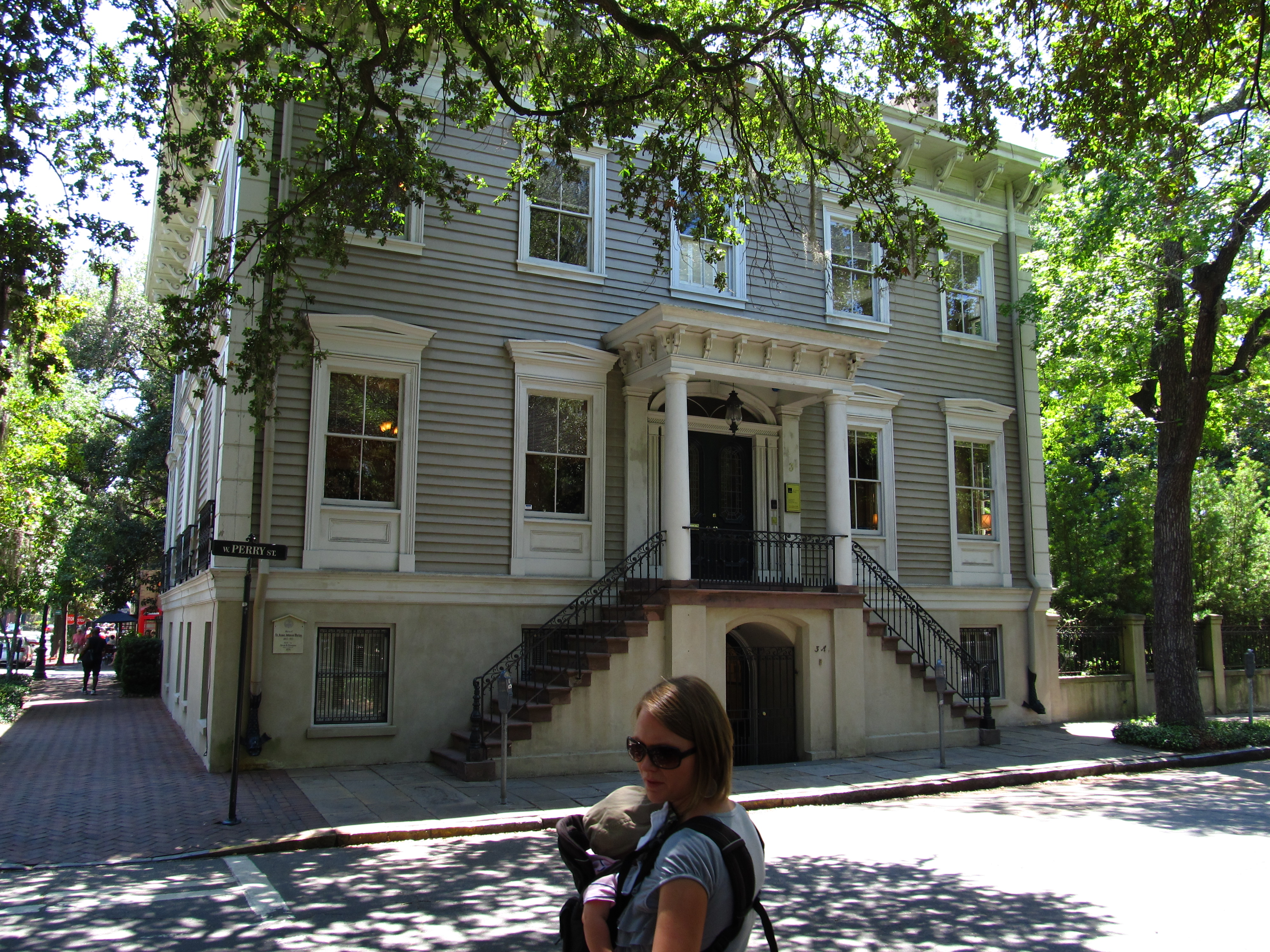
3 West Perry Street in Savannah, Georgia, Waring's family home

Waring was born in 1902, in Savannah, Georgia, the youngest of three sons of Pinckney Alston Waring, a real-estate broker, and Lillie Horton Ellis, who died before he reached the age of four. His paternal grandfather was Dr. James Johnston Waring (1829–1888), his great-uncle was Civil War lieutenant general J. Fred. Waring, and his cousin was Savannah amateur archaeologist Antonio J. Waring Jr.

He attended Governor Dummer Academy in Byfield, Massachusetts, followed by a graduation from Yale College in 1923. Waring also attended the University of Cambridge for advanced study, and remained in England to teach for a year. While there, he edited fellow Georgian Joel Chandler Harris' The Tar Baby and Other Rhymes of Uncle Remus, one of the Uncle Remus volumes. He returned to his native land in 1926 to teach at the Salisbury School in Connecticut. He later earned a master's degree from the University of Wisconsin–Madison before teaching at a girls' school in New Hope, Pennsylvania, until 1935.

He joined the faculty of Western Reserve Academy (WRA), in Hudson, Ohio, in 1935, where he remained for the next thirty-two years, teaching English and History. He was known on campus for his "literary drawl", his smoking pipes and tweeds.

During World War II, Waring served for a couple of years with the American Field Service as an ambulance driver in Syria and North Africa. He later taught at the American University of Beirut.

In 1953, Waring married WRA librarian Julianna Fitch, who shared his love for books, art, history and architecture. The couple retired to Waring's hometown of Savannah in 1967, living in his ancestral home at 3 West Perry Street in Chippewa Square.

Waring taught briefly at Savannah State College and Savannah County Day School.

He was serving as the president of the Georgia Historical Society up until his death.

== Death and legacy ==
Waring died in 1972, aged 69. He is buried in Savannah's Bonaventure Cemetery. His wife survived him by fourteen years, and is buried beside him.

The WRA's Waring Prize was established in his honor shortly after his death.

== Bibliography ==
Waring wrote three books: James W. Ellsworth and the Refounding of the WRA (1961), The Growing Years: WRA under Wood, Boothby and Hayden (1972) and Cerveau's Savannah (1973). At the time of his death, Waring was writing a history of Savannah's Christ Church.
