= 134-142 Houston Street =

Historic building in Savannah, Georgia

134–142 Houston Street
- Kate Baldwin Free Kindergarten
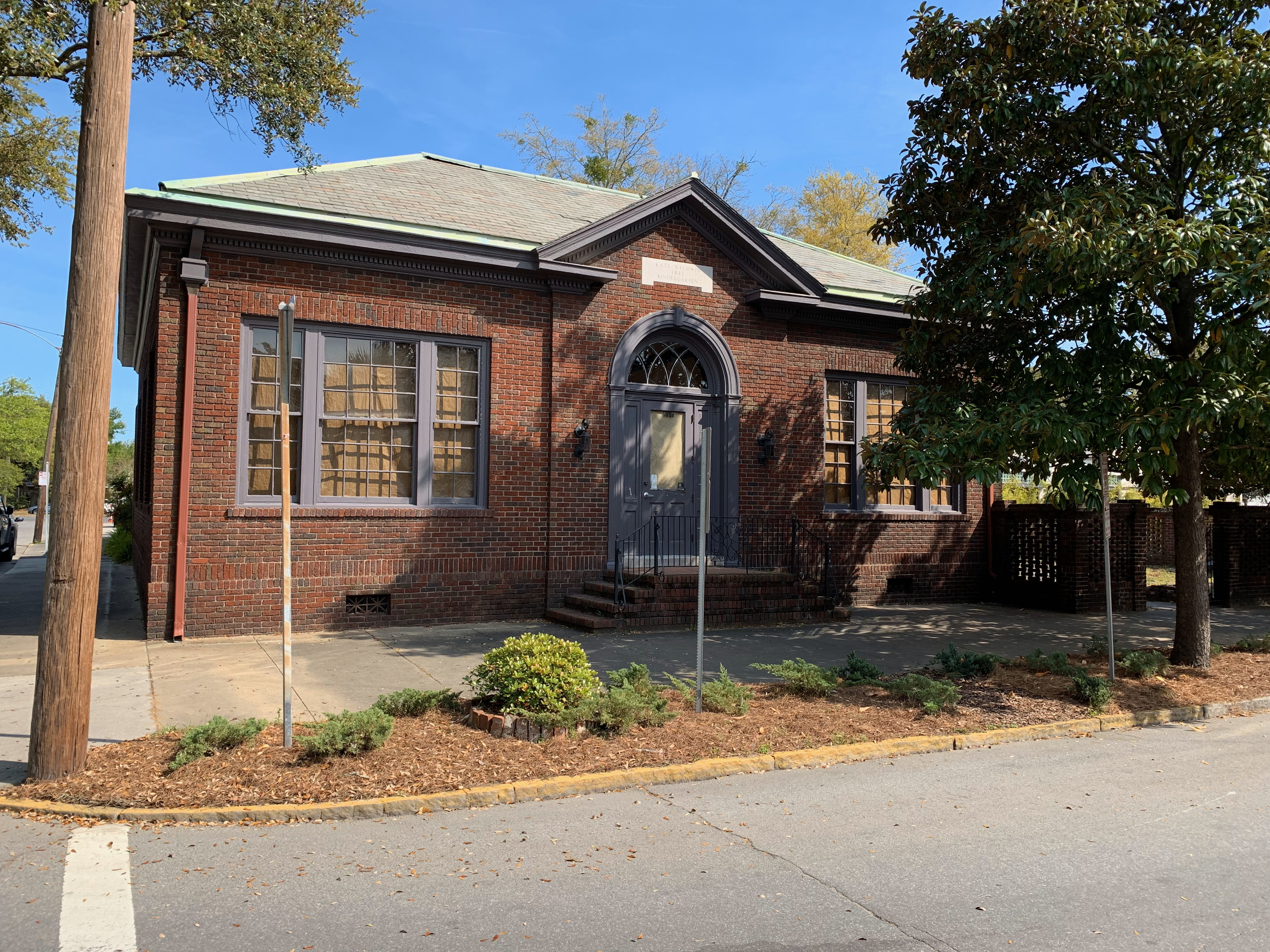
- The building's entrance in 2019
- Interactive map of the 134–142 Houston Street area

General information
- Location: Savannah, Georgia, United States, 134–142 Houston Street
- Coordinates: 32°04′33″N 81°05′10″W
- Current tenants: Hidden Well Acupuncture
- Completed: circa 1926

Technical details
- Floor count: 2 (including basement)
- Floor area: 3,722 sq. ft

134–142 Houston Street, in the Historic District of Savannah, Georgia, is a building completed around 1926. Constructed of brick, the building stands at the corner of Houston Street and East York Street in the southeastern corner of Greene Square. It is currently occupied by a meditation clinic.

The original part of today's building is square in form. The main door faces west onto Houston Street. A triple-sash window is installed on either side of the door, which has a molded arch above it, surrounding a semi-circular soda–lime glass window with ten panes. Also either side of the door, about halfway up, are two small lanterns. Four steps on either side rise to meet, creating the stoop. An iron railing begins from the second steps.

The East York Street (northern) side of the building has three triple-sash windows.

The East York Lane (southern) façade has a door, with a single sash window immediately either side of it and a triple sash on the eastern extremity, giving an asymmetrical appearance. The door, reached by four brick steps, has the same semi-circular window design, and two lanterns, as the main door. Another door, facing south but part of a wing on the building's eastern façade, is accessed by a set of concrete steps. The yard is surrounded on the Houston Street and East York Lane sides by a brick wall with light gaps. There is a gate in the wall on the Houston Street side.

The eastern (rear) side has a single-storey extension, likely part of the remodeling of 1965.

The roof, in the hip-style with a flat top, is made of slate, with lead flashing on its ridges, valleys, hips and drip edges.

== Kate Baldwin Free Kindergarten ==
The building became the home of the Kate Baldwin Free Kindergarten, founded by George Johnson Baldwin (1856–1927) and his sisters, Kate (1861–1932) and Nellie (1869–1954), as a memorial to their mother, Kate A. Baldwin (1830–1898). The business was incorporated in 1899 as a "benevolent and charitable institution for the free training, instruction, and education of young children under the kindergarten system of education, so as to inculcate in them habits of industry and morality and fit them for entrance into institutions of higher education."

The project was continued by George Baldwin's children, George Hull Baldwin and Dorothea Irwin, under the direction of Martha G. Waring. Under the supervision of Massachusetts native Hortense M. Orcutt, from 1907 for the subsequent twenty-five years, it grew into a popular system of kindergartens and a training school (known as the Normal Department) for kindergarten teachers, with as many as five kindergartens in operation at one time. The network educated approximately four thousand children between 1899 and 1943. It was in 1943 that its vice-president Martha Gallaudet Waring died.

After the death of Hortense Orcutt in 1936, the training school was discontinued, but the Baldwins continued the East Side Kindergarten, and nine other kindergartens continued under the auspices of the public schools, a church and other organizations.

The Kate Baldwin Free Kindergarten name was dissolved in 2001. The school subsequently became known as the Savannah Nursery School and the Montessori Pre-School.

Kate Baldwin, the wife of Daniel H. Baldwin, Sr., died on November 11, 1898, aged 68.

== Architectural detail ==
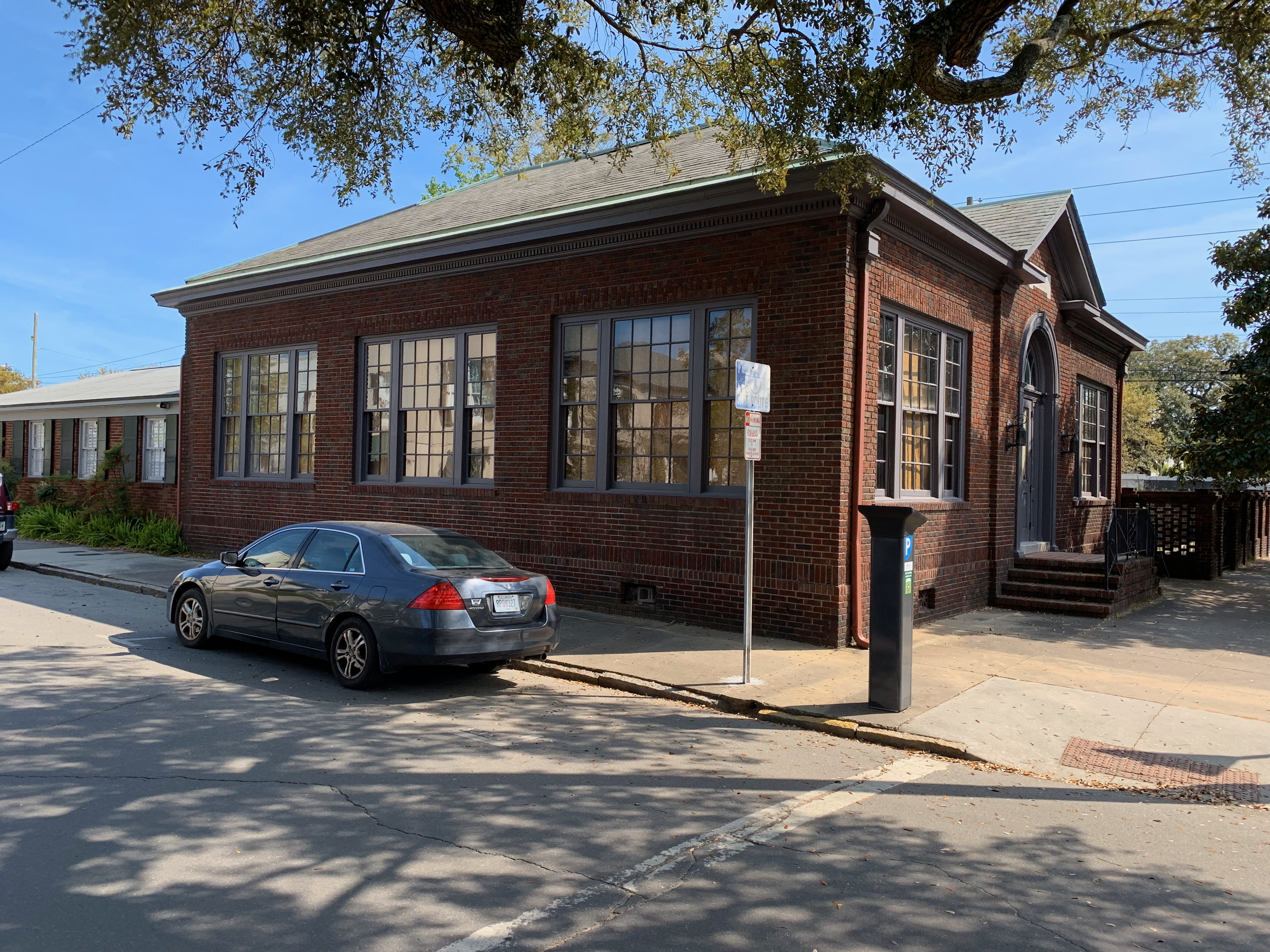
The East York Street (northern) side of the building

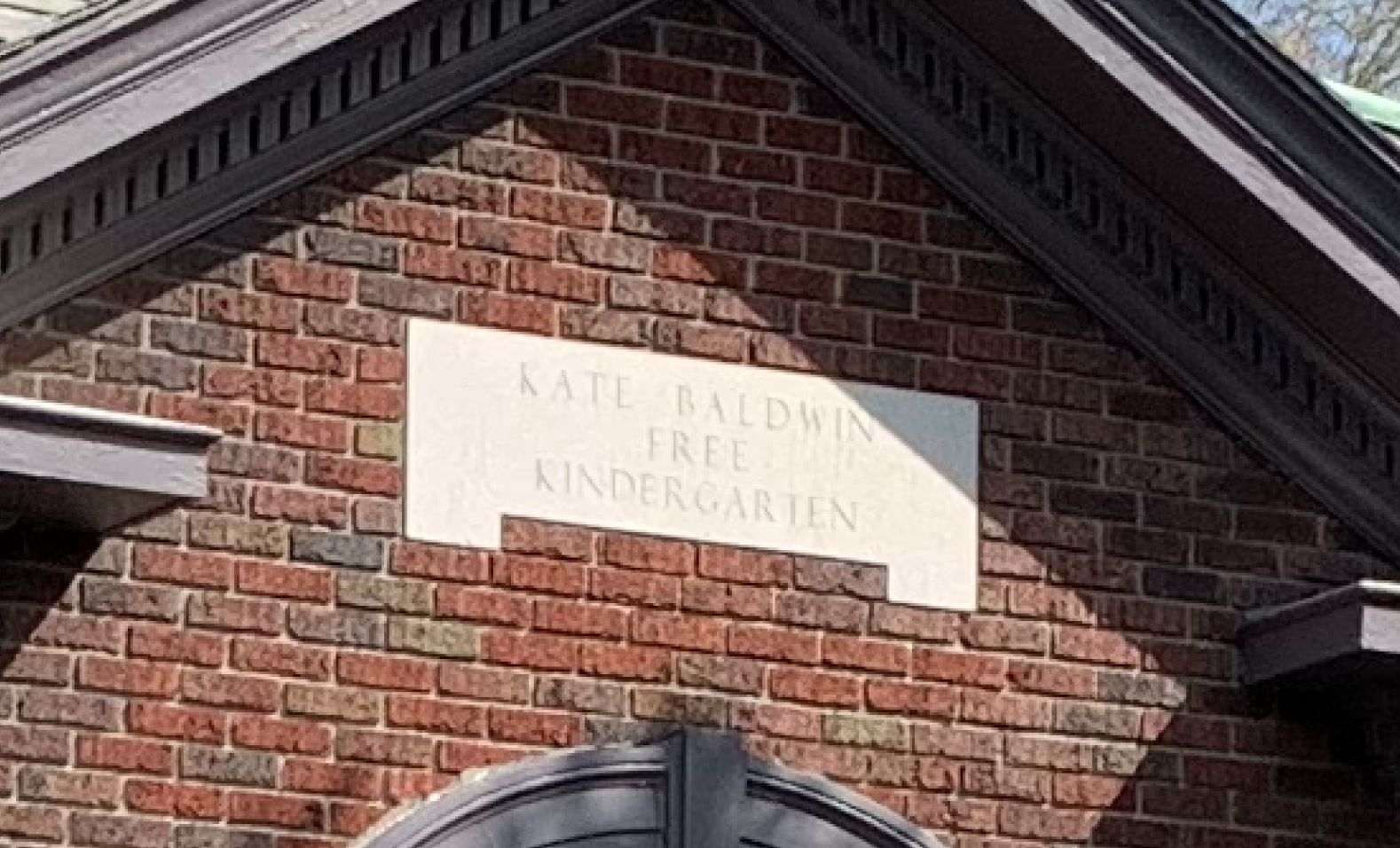
A close-up of the plaque above the main door
