= Perry Street (Savannah, Georgia) =

Prominent street in Savannah, Georgia

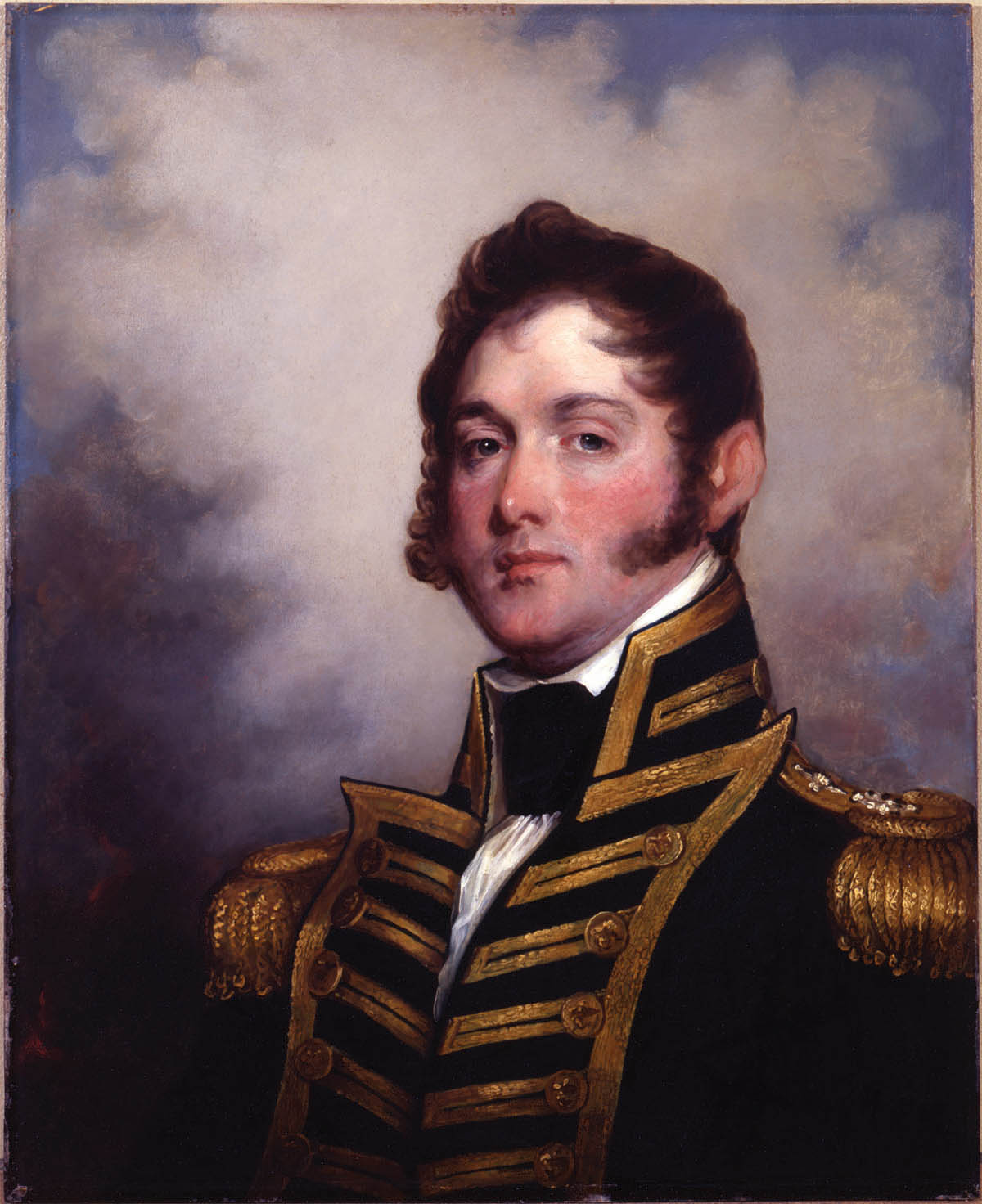
- The street's namesake, Oliver Hazard Perry
- Former name: Wilkes Street (1801 to 1815)
- Namesake: Oliver Hazard Perry
- Length: 0.46 mi (0.74 km)
- Location: Savannah, Georgia, U.S.
- West end: Barnard Street (western section); Habersham Street (eastern section)
- East end: East Broad Street (western section); Abercorn Street (eastern section)

Perry Street is a prominent street in Savannah, Georgia, United States. Located between Hull Street to the north and Liberty Street to the south, it runs for about 0.46 miles (0.74 km) from Barnard Street in the west to East Broad Street in the east. It is interrupted by Colonial Park Cemetery from Abercorn Street to Habersham Street. Originally known only as Perry Street singular, its addresses are now split between "West Perry Street" and "East Perry Street", the transition occurring at Bull Street in the center of the downtown area. It is named for commodore Oliver Hazard Perry, who served in the War of 1812. The street is entirely within Savannah Historic District, a National Historic Landmark District.

Perry Street passes through three squares on their southern side. From west to east:

- Orleans Square
- Chippewa Square
- Crawford Square

== Notable buildings and structures ==
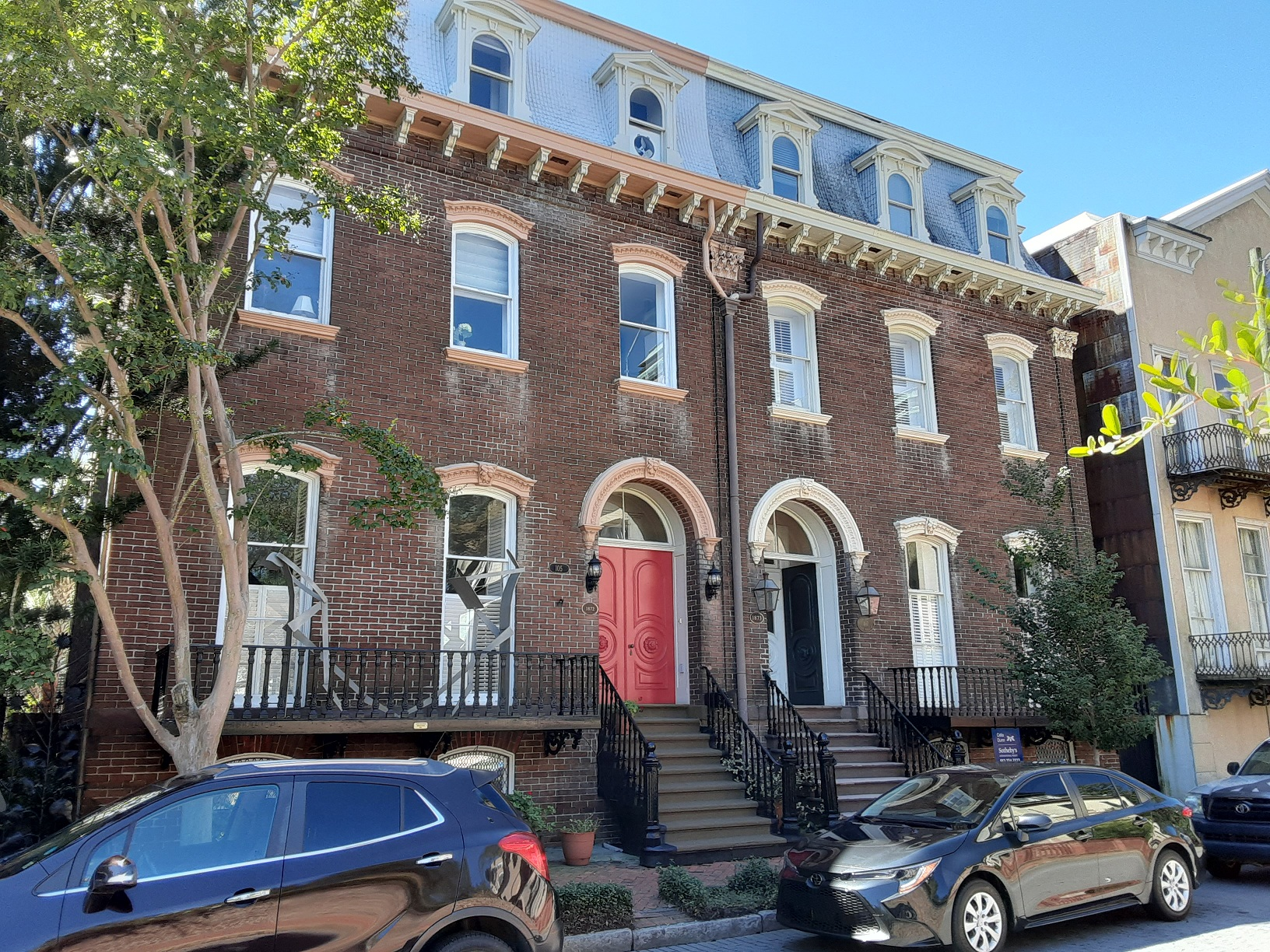
John Martin–A.J. Miller Duplex, 105–107 West Perry Street

Below is a selection of notable buildings and structures on Perry Street, all in Savannah's Historic District. From west to east:

West Perry Street

- John Morel Property, 117–119 West Perry Street (1818)
- Henry Hayme Duplex, 113–115 West Perry Street (1887)
- Mordecai Myers House, 111 West Perry Street (1833)
- Laura Mehrtens House, 109 West Perry Street (1904)
- John Martin–A.J. Miller Duplex, 105–107 West Perry Street (1872)
- Frederick Tebeau House, 101 West Perry Street (1836)
- Stoddard Row, 19–25 West Perry Street (1855)
- John Stoddard House, 15 West Perry Street (1867)
- 3 West Perry Street (1831)

East Perry Street

- Hetty, Abbie & Phillipa Minis House, 11 East Perry Street (circa 1820)
- James Roberts Row House, 517–523 East Perry Street (1871)

The Elliott–Cranston House stood at 23 East Perry Street between 1821 and 1935, when it was demolished. It was the home of Rev. Walter Cranston.
