= Chippewa Square (Savannah, Georgia) =

Public square in Savannah, Georgia

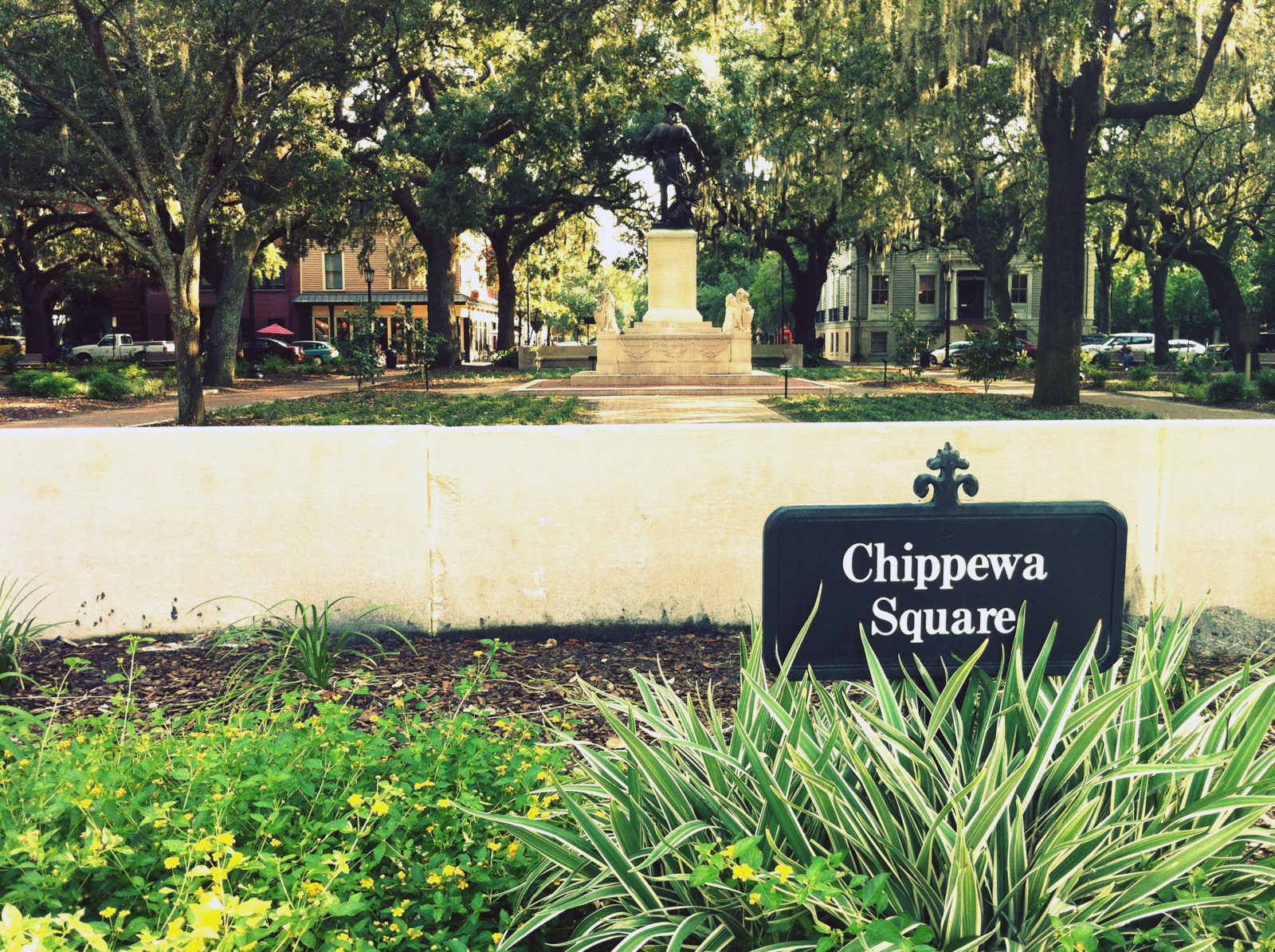
- The south-facing James Oglethorpe Monument, viewed from where the bench in Forrest Gump was located for its 1993 filming
- Interactive map of Chippewa Square
- Namesake: Battle of Chippawa
- Maintained by: City of Savannah
- Location: Savannah, Georgia, U.S.
- Coordinates: 32.0758°N 81.0931°W
- North: Bull Street
- East: East McDonough Street
- South: Bull Street
- West: West McDonough Street

Construction
- Completion: 1815 (211 years ago)

Chippewa Square is one of the 22 squares of Savannah, Georgia, United States. It is located in the middle row of the city's five rows of squares, on Bull Street and McDonough Street, and was laid out in 1815. It is south of Wright Square, west of Colonial Park Cemetery, north of Madison Square and east of Orleans Square. The oldest building on the square is The Savannah Theatre, at 222 Bull Street, which dates to 1818.

The square is named in honor of American soldiers killed in the Battle of Chippawa during the War of 1812. (The "Chippewa" spelling is correct in reference to this square.)

In the center of the square is the James Oglethorpe Monument, created by sculptor Daniel Chester French and architect Henry Bacon and unveiled in 1910. Oglethorpe faces south, toward Georgia's one-time enemy in Spanish Florida, and his sword is drawn. Busts of Confederate figures Francis Stebbins Bartow and Lafayette McLaws were moved from Chippewa Square to Forsyth Park to make room for the Oglethorpe monument. Due to the location of the monument, Savannahians sometimes refer to this as Oglethorpe Square, but that is located just to the northeast.

The "park bench" scene which opens the 1994 film Forrest Gump was filmed on the north side of Chippewa Square. The bench was a fiberglass prop, rather than one of the park's actual benches. One of the prop benches used in the film is on display at Savannah History Museum. The other original prop is kept in Paramount Studios, Los Angeles.

Chippewa Square is also home to the First Baptist Church (1833), the Independent Presbyterian Church and the Philbrick–Eastman House (1847).

== Dedication ==
Namesake	Image	Note
Battle of Chippawa		The square is named for the Battle of Chippawa, a conflict during the War of 1812.

== Markers and structures ==
Object	Image	Note
James Oglethorpe Monument		James Oglethorpe Monument in the center of the square.
Historical marker		Historical marker for the monument, erected by the Georgia Historical Commission in 1957.
Historical marker		Historical marker for the square, laid in 1815.

== Constituent buildings ==
Each building below is in one of the eight blocks around the square composed of four residential "tything" blocks and four civic ("trust") blocks, now known as the Oglethorpe Plan. They are listed with construction years where known.

Northwestern residential/tything block

- Independent Presbyterian Church, 207 Bull Street (1891) – by John Holden Greene; gutted in the 1889 fire, rebuilt 1891
  - Independent Presbyterian Church School Building, 207 Bull Street (1894) – by Charles Henry
- Honora Foley Property, 14 West Hull Street (1896) – by Henry Urban; also known as the Foley House Inn
- Julius Perlinski House, 22 West Hull Street (c. 1903)

Northwestern civic/trust block

- First Baptist Church, 223 Bull Street (1833)

Southwestern civic/trust block

- Philbrick–Eastman House, 17 West McDonough Street (1847)

Southwestern residential/tything block

- 3 West Perry Street (1831) – former home of Joseph Frederick Waring
- John Stoddard House, 15 West Perry Street (1867)
- Stoddard Row, 19–25 West Perry Street (1854–55)
- 233 Bull Street (1842) – originally the home of Moses Eastman, later of the Philbrick–Eastman House

Northeastern residential/tything block

- Board of Education Building, 208 Bull Street (1908–1910)

Northeastern civic/trust block

- The Savannah Theatre, 222 Bull Street (1818) – oldest building on the square

Southeastern civic/trust block

- Julius Koox Duplex, 230–232 Bull Street (1871)

Southeastern residential/tything block

- 234 Bull Street (c. 1900)
- 240 Bull Street (1890)
- Hetty, Abbie & Phillipa Minis House, 11 East Perry Street (c. 1820)

== Gallery ==
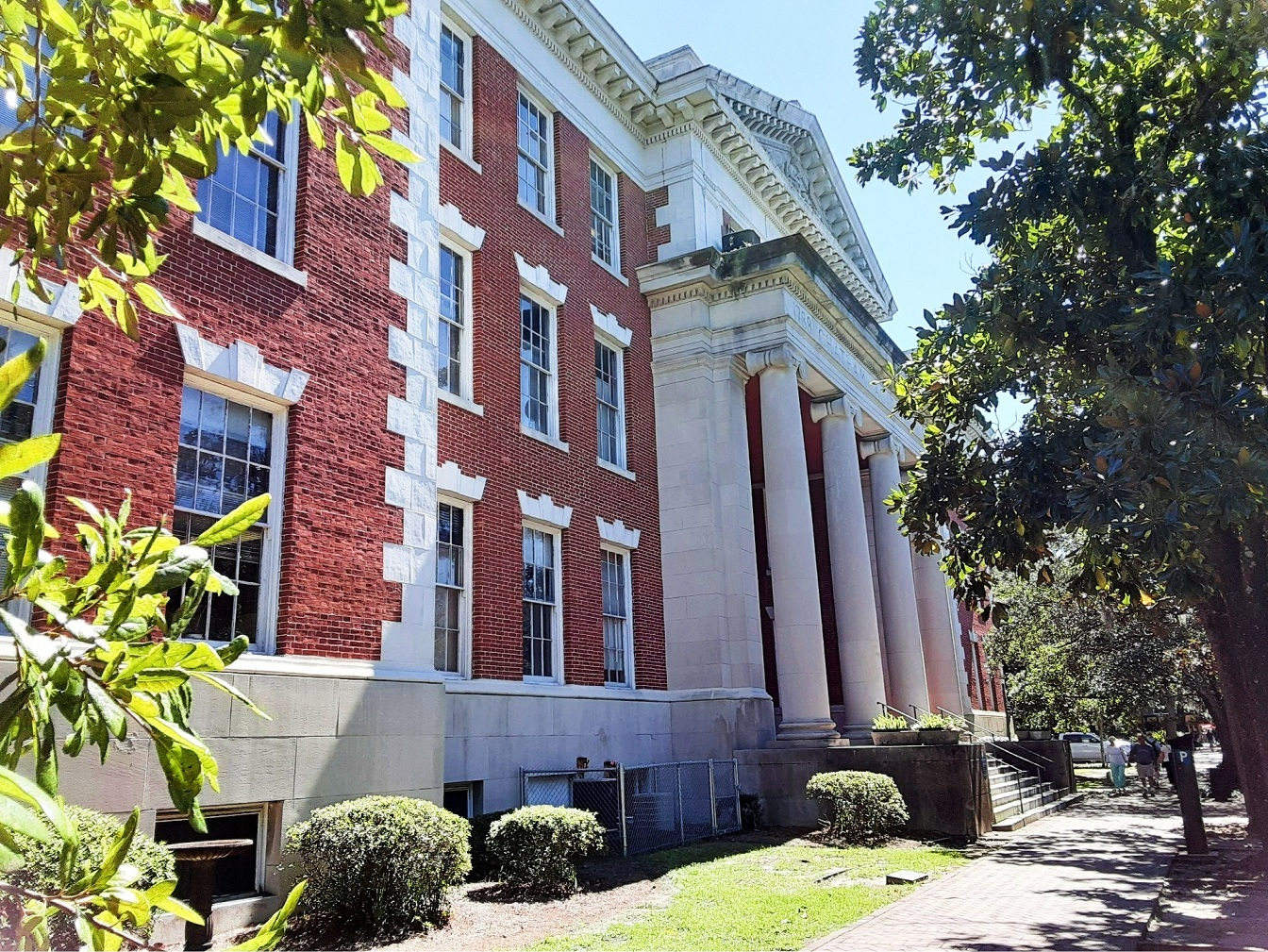
Board of Education Building (western half; Bull Street facade), 208 Bull Street

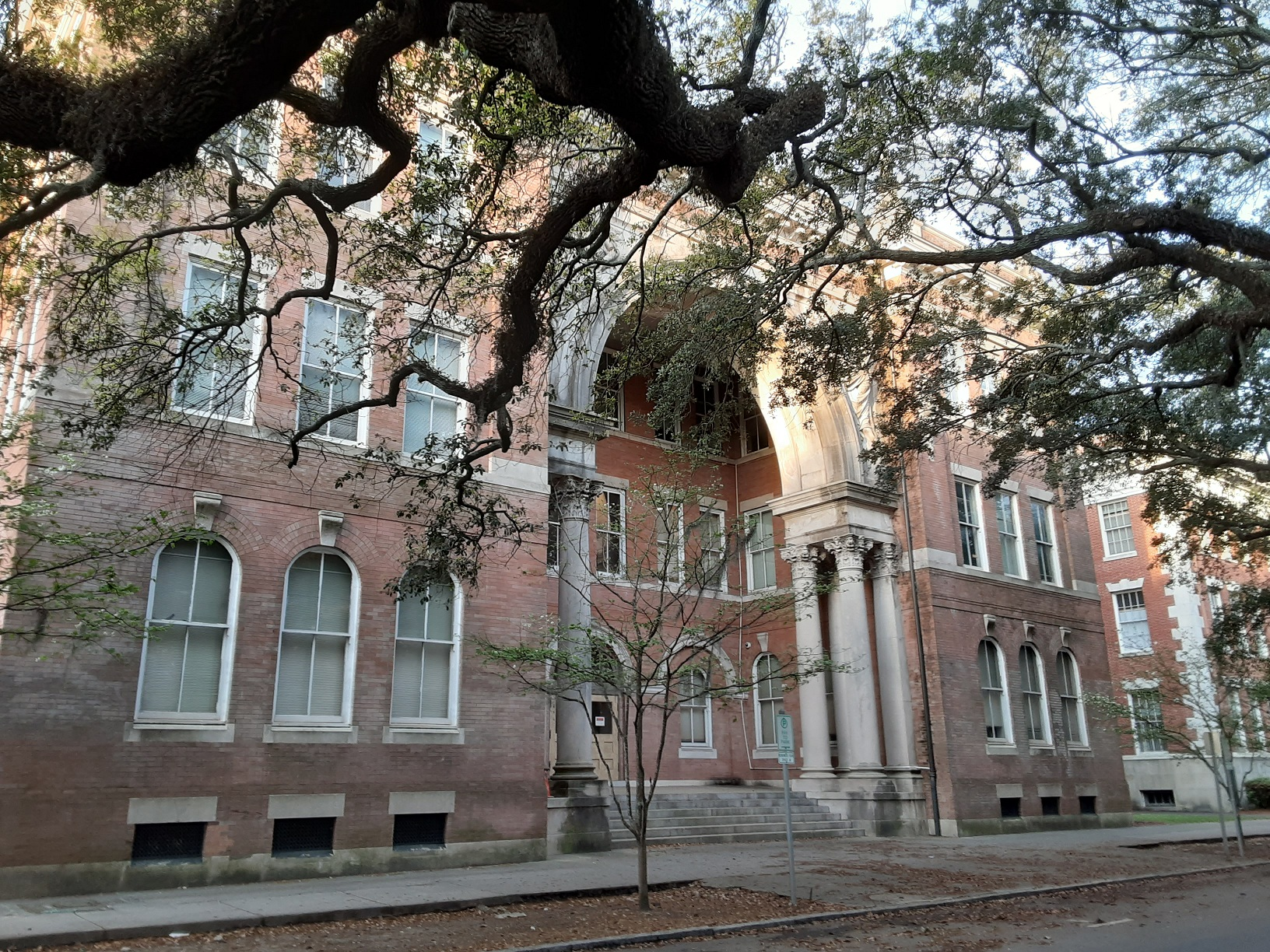
Board of Education Building (eastern rear half), 208 Bull Street

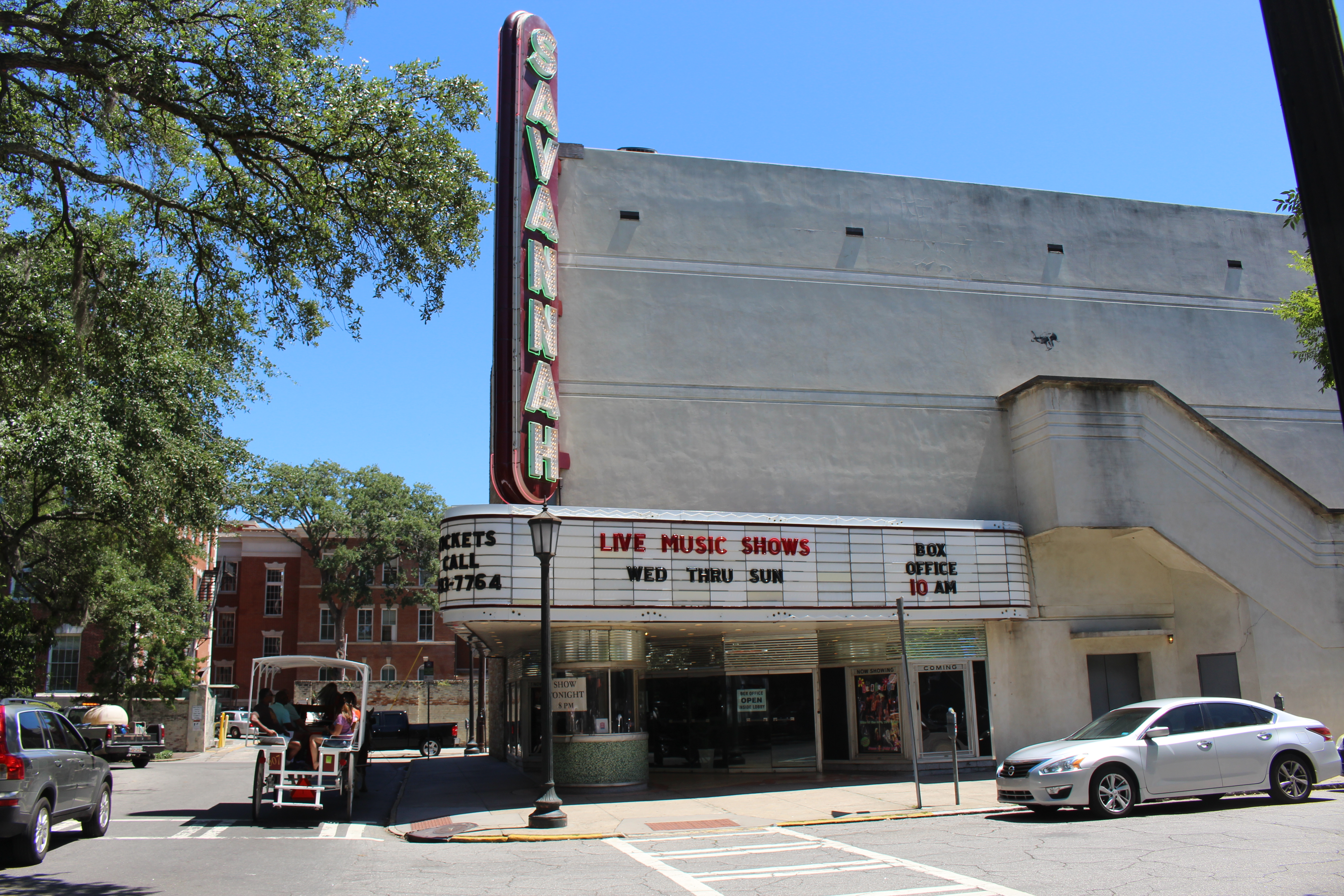
The Savannah Theatre, 222 Bull Street

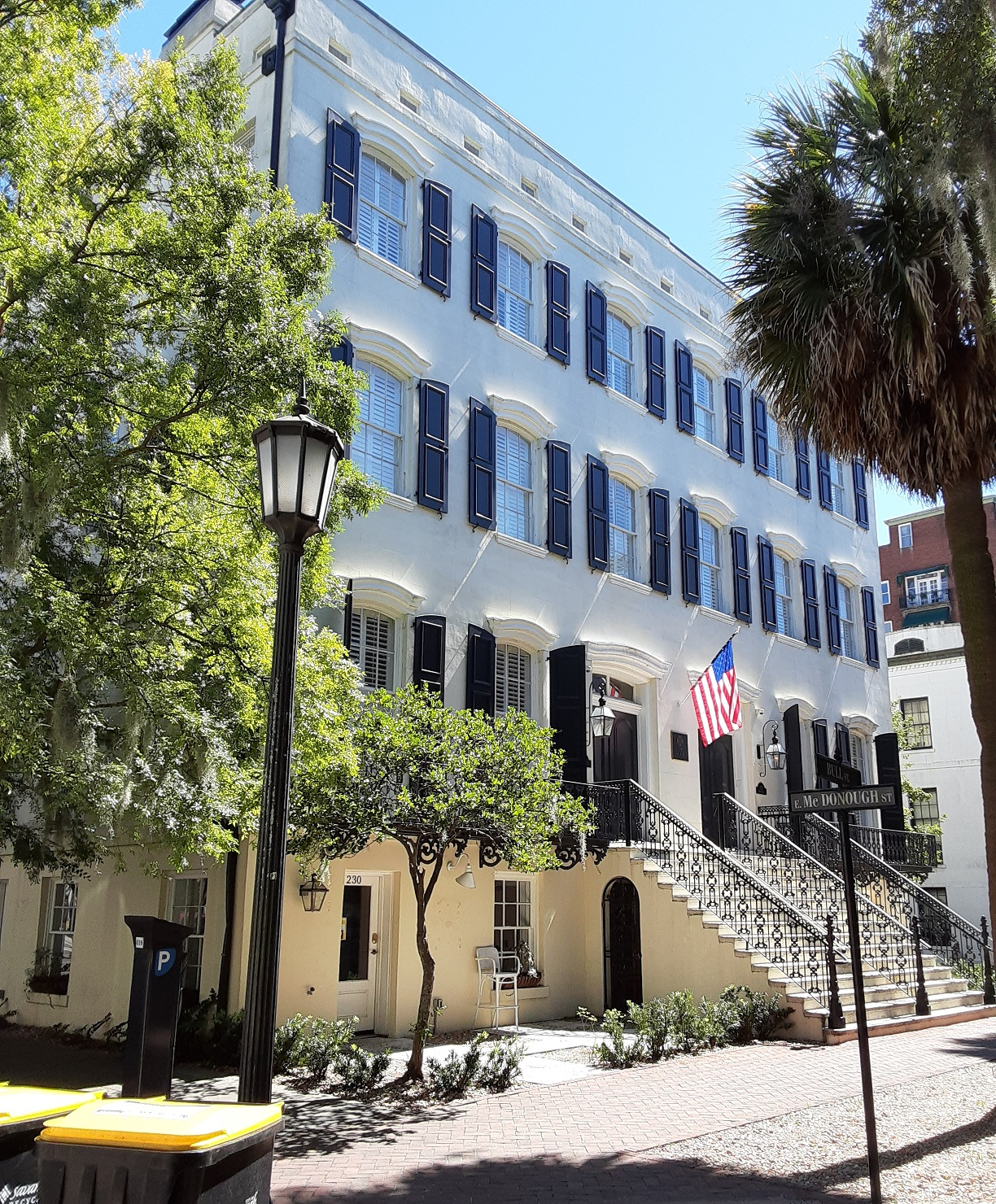
Julius Koox Duplex, 230–232 Bull Street

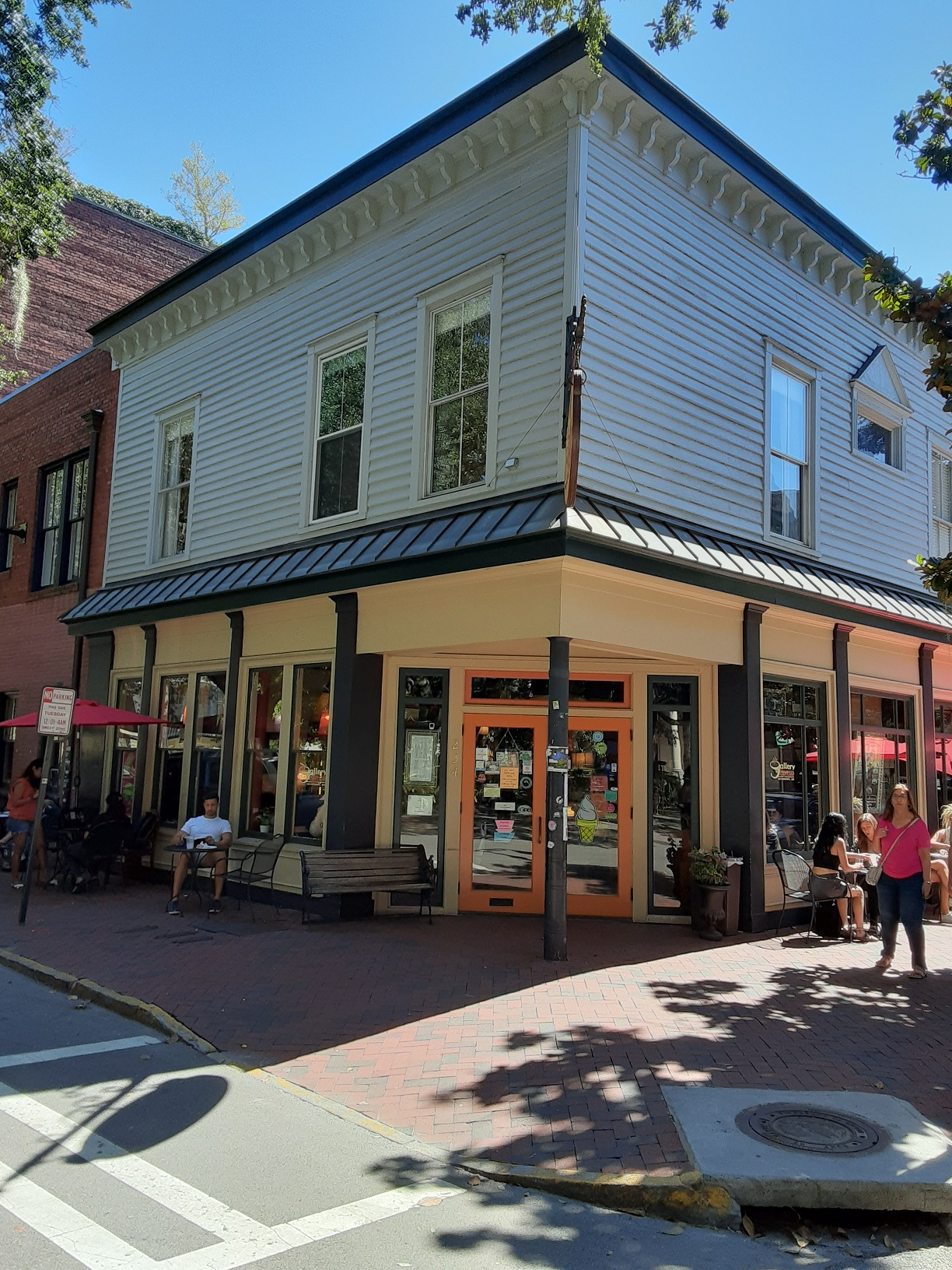
234 Bull Street

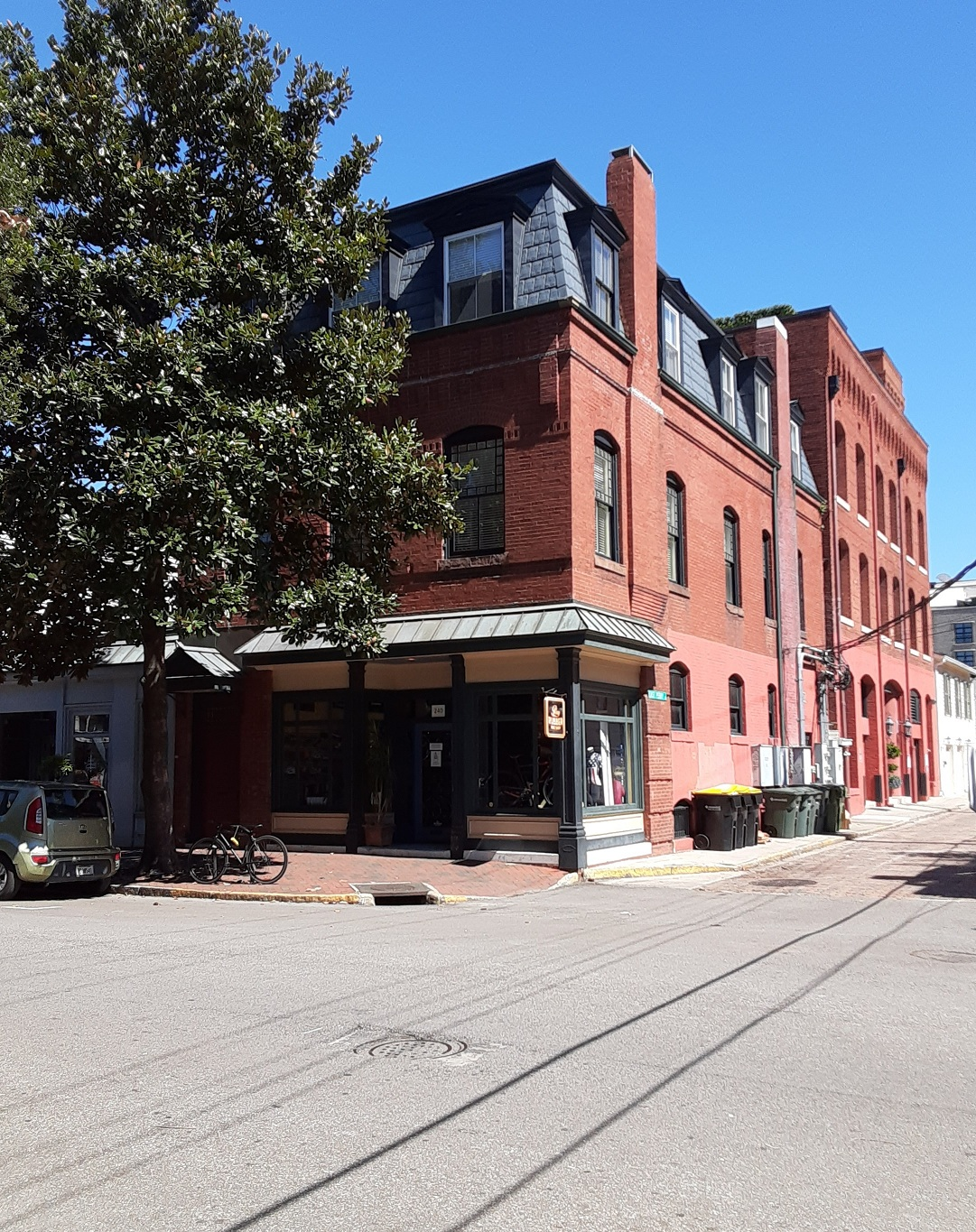
240 Bull Street

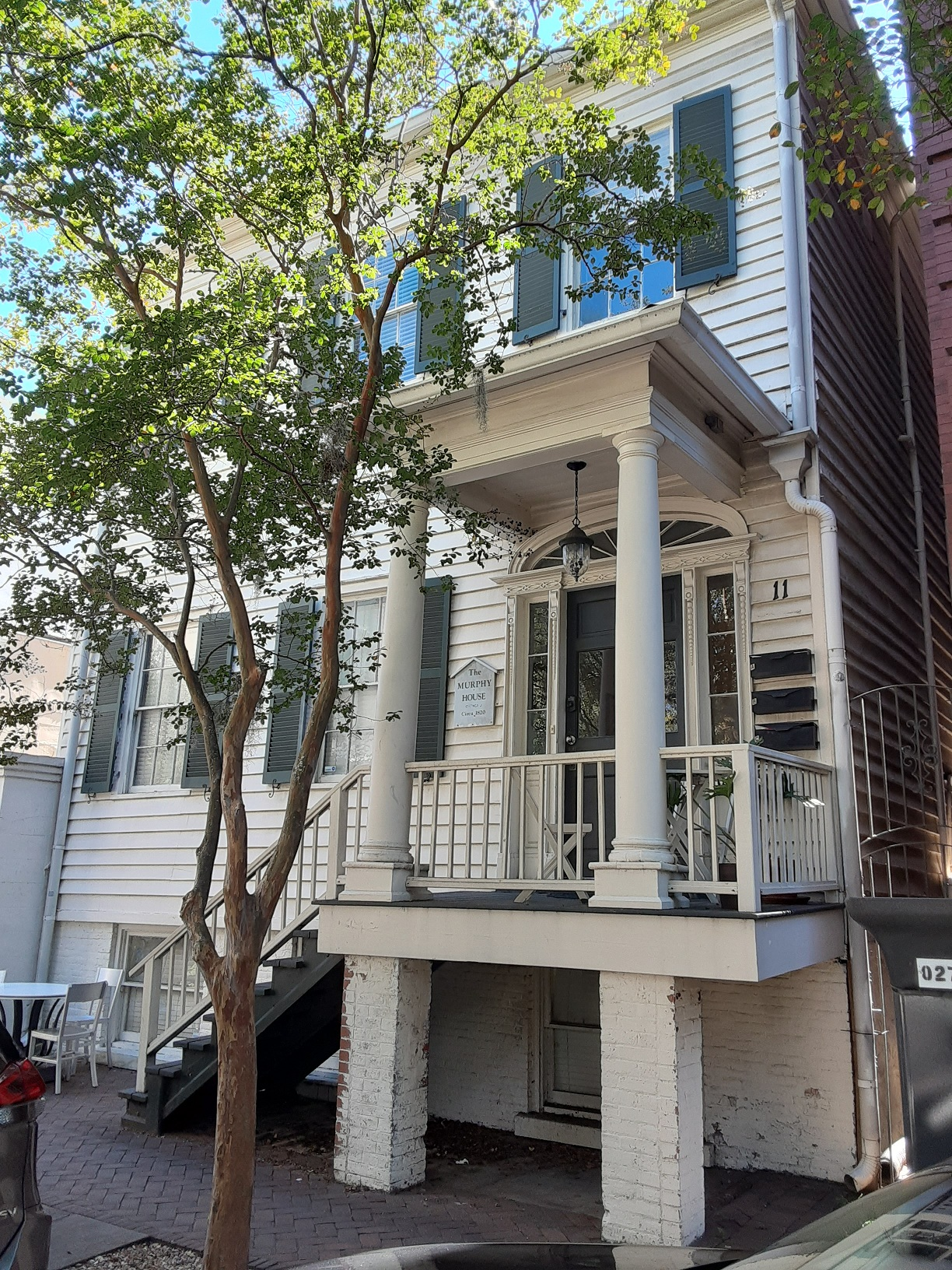
Hetty, Abbie & Phillipa Minis House, 11 East Perry Street

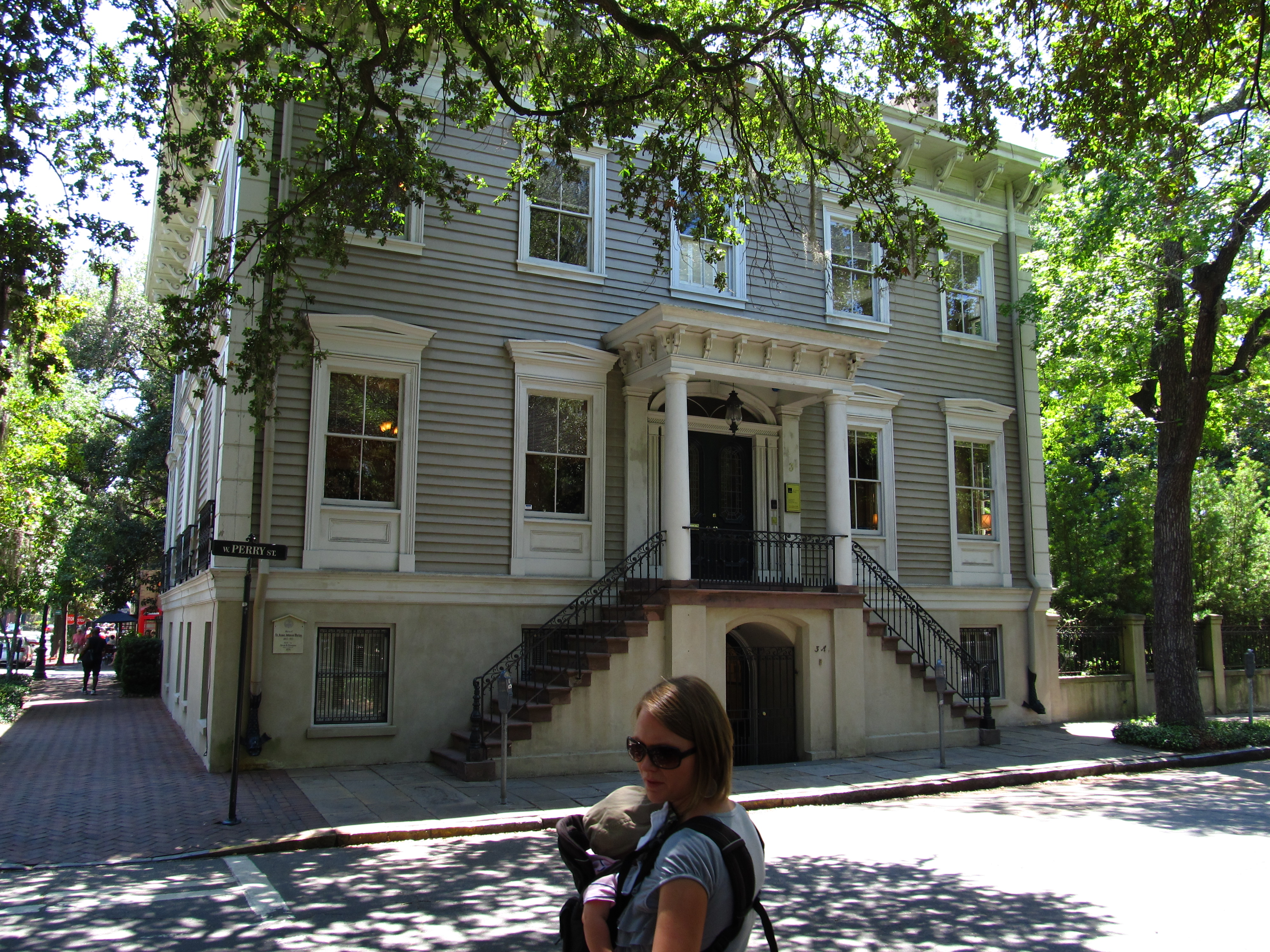
3 West Perry Street

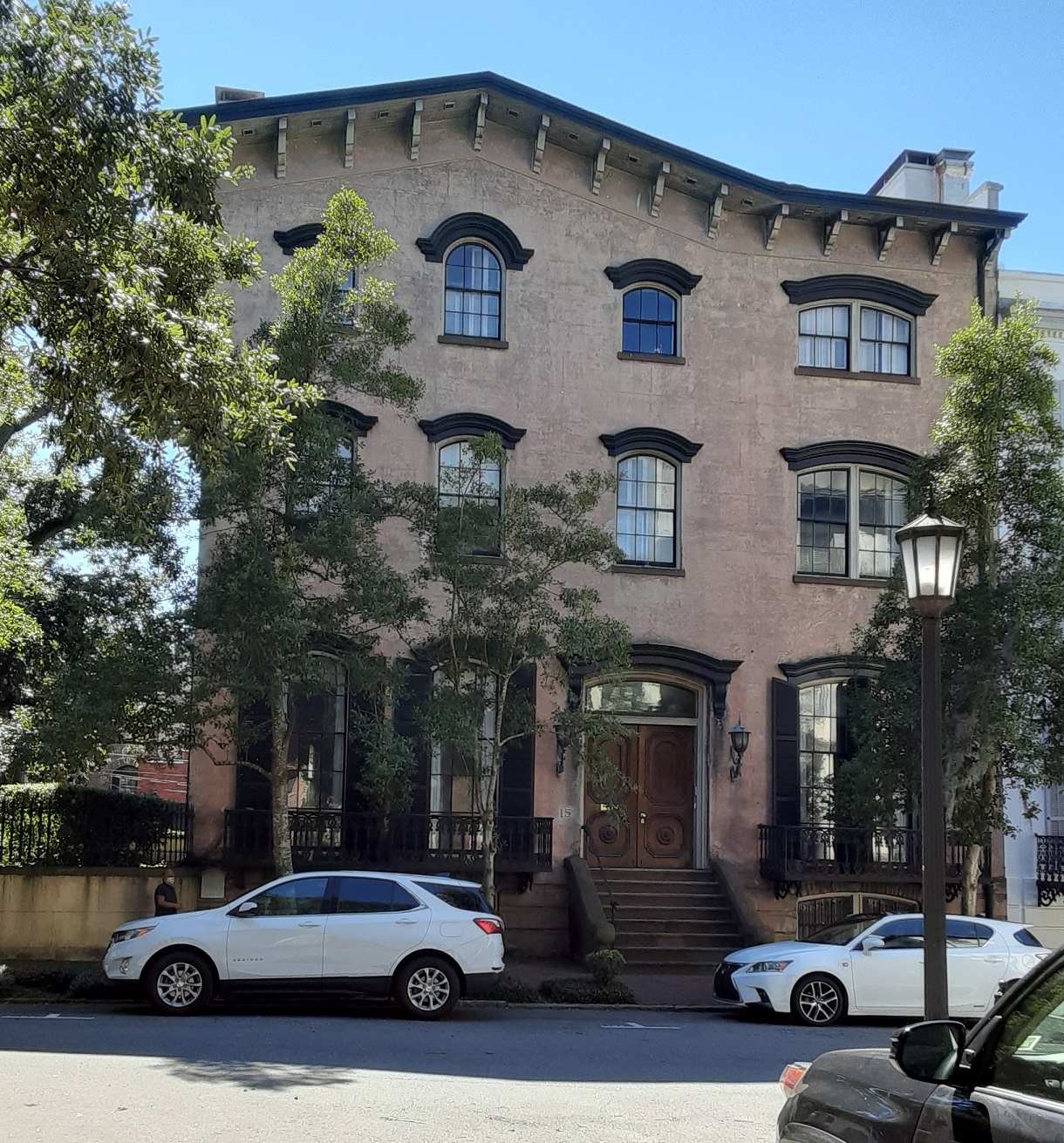
John Stoddard House, 15 West Perry Street

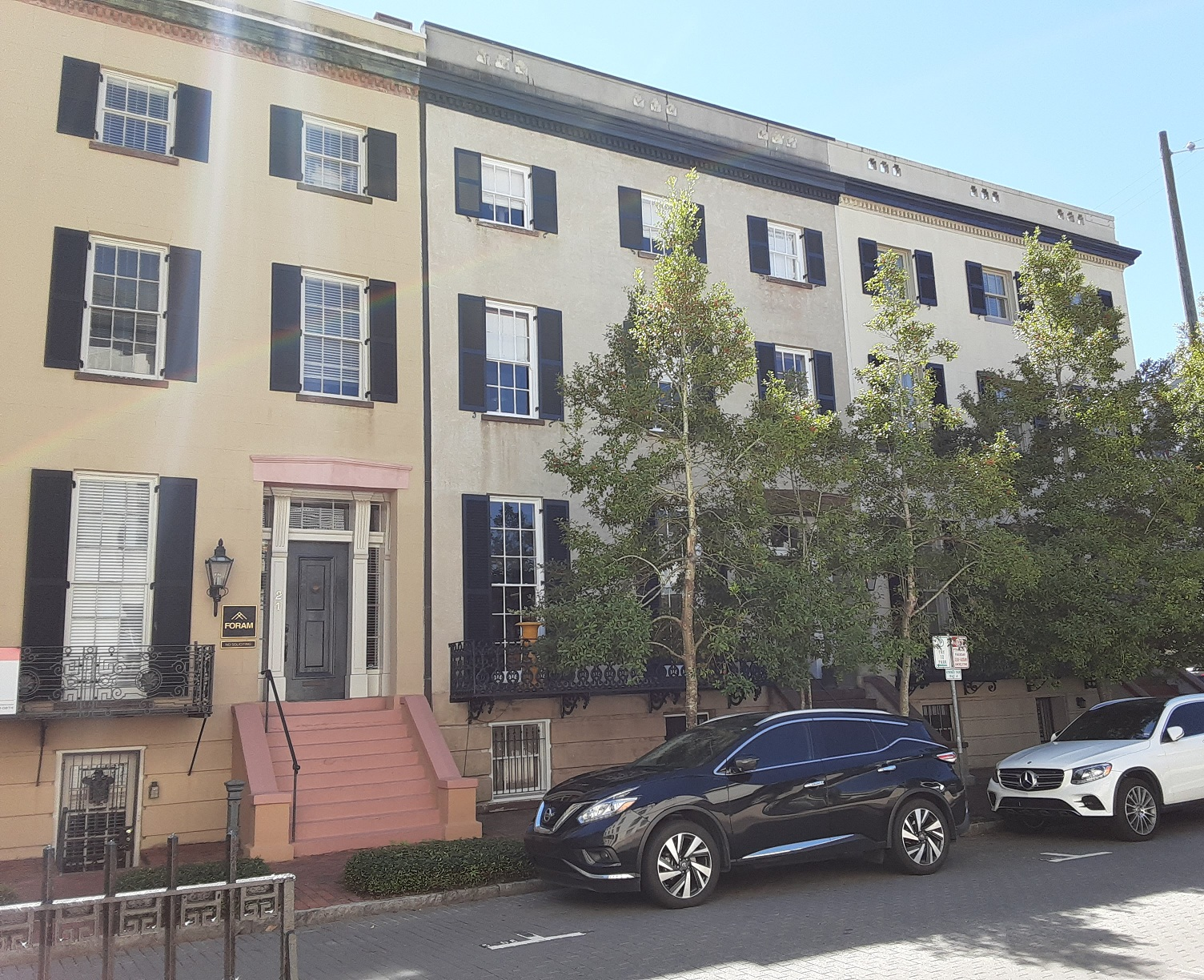
Stoddard Row, 19–25 West Perry Street

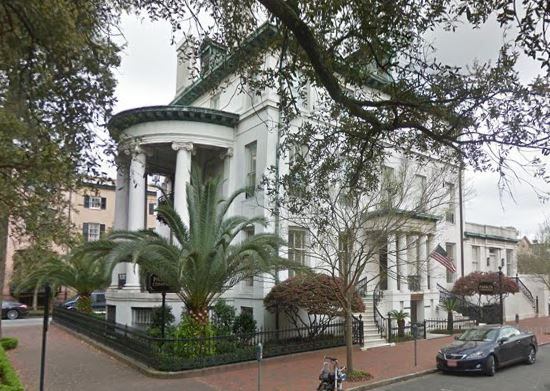
Philbrick–Eastman House, 17 West McDonough Street

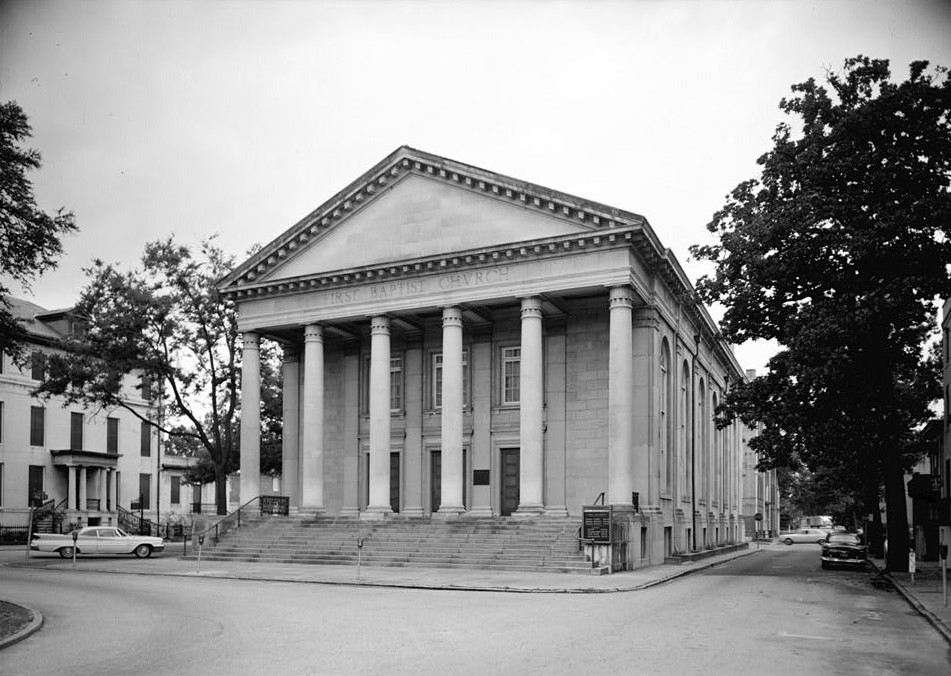
First Baptist Church, 223 Bull Street

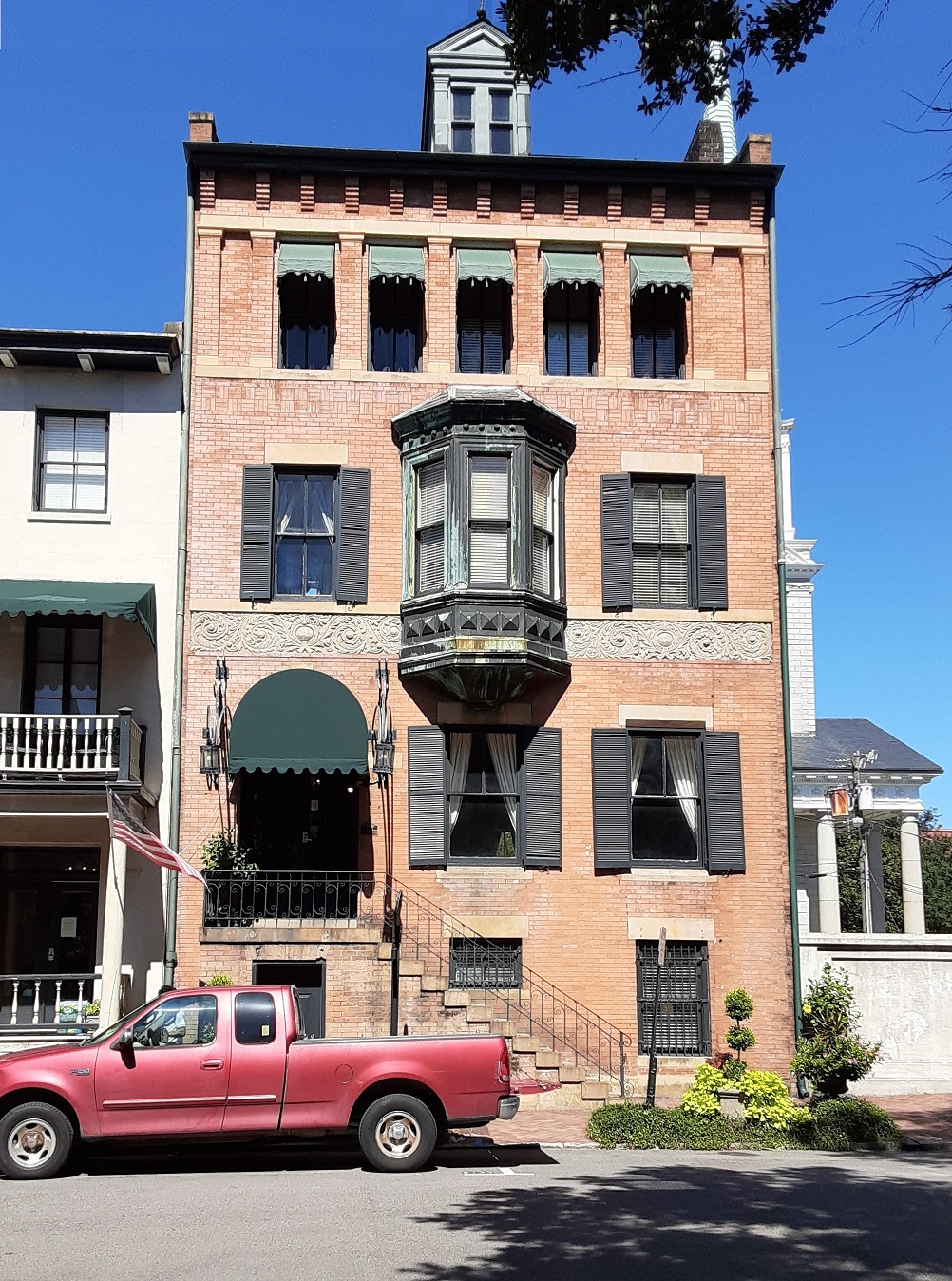
Foley House Inn, 14 West Hull Street

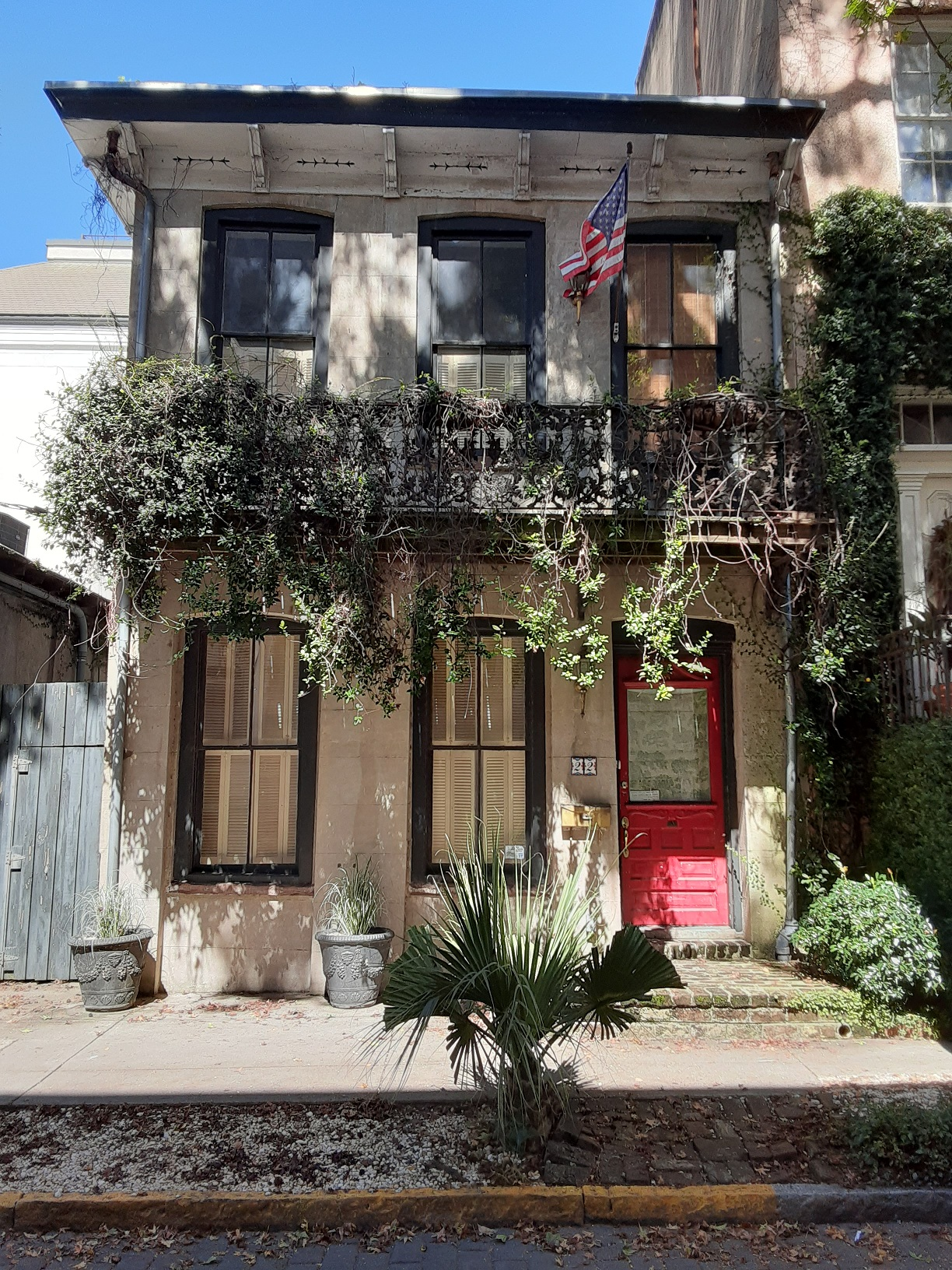
Julius Perlinski House, 22 West Hull Street

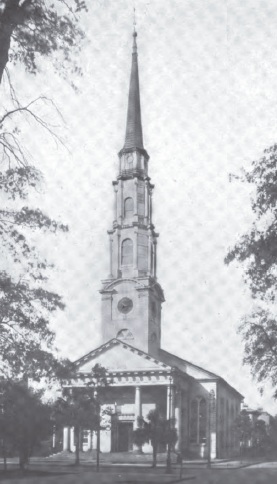
Independent Presbyterian Church, 207 Bull Street

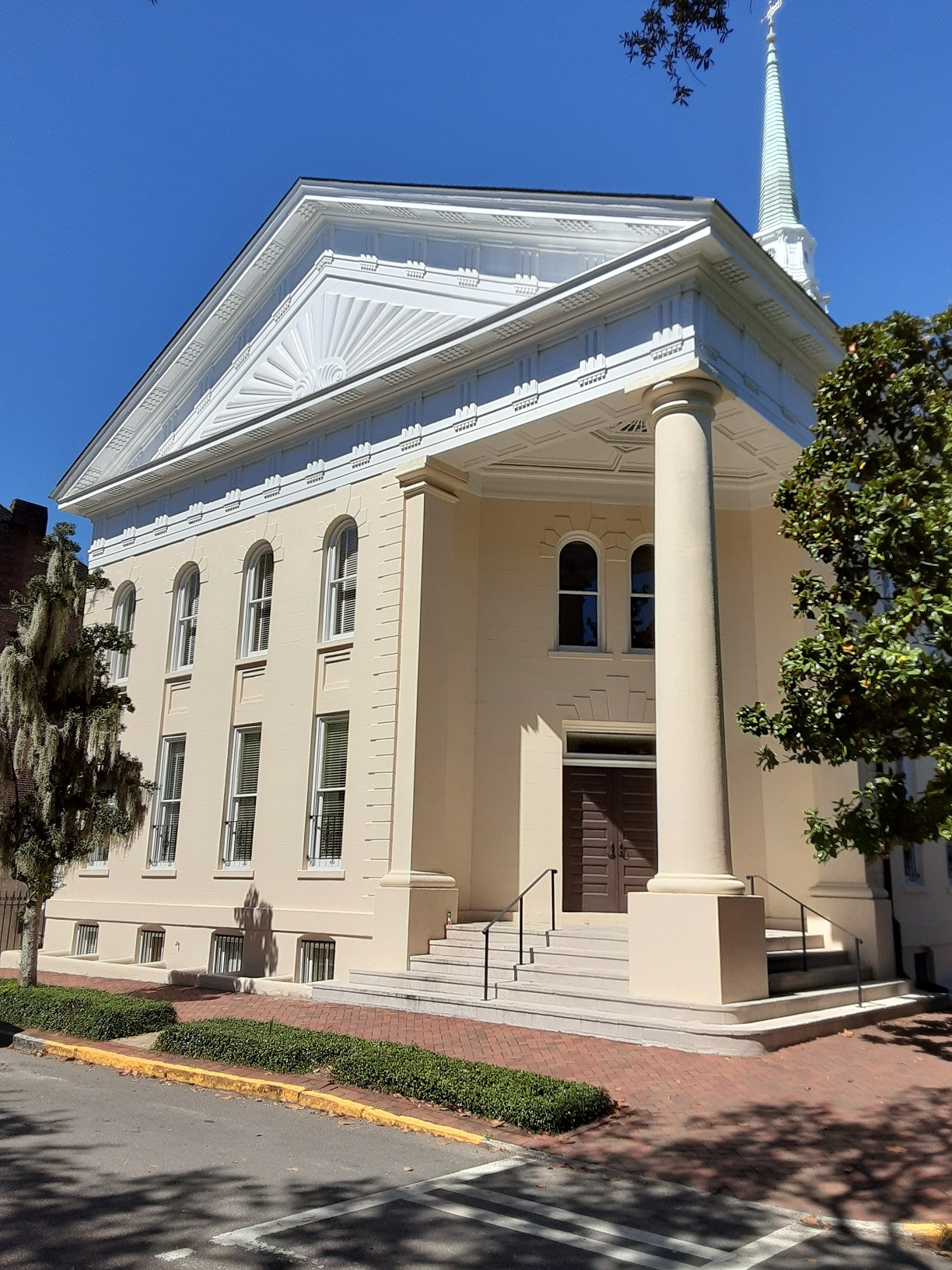
Independent Presbyterian Church School Building, 207 Bull Street
