= Henry C. Urban =

German architect

- Born: 27 December 1848; Frankfurt, Germany
- Died: 20 September 1927 (aged 78); Savannah, Georgia, U.S.
- Occupation: Architect
- Design: Beth Eden Baptist Church, Savannah, Georgia (1893)

Henry C. Urban (27 December 1848 – 20 September 1927) was a German architect. After emigrating to the United States, he became noted for his work in Savannah, Georgia.

== Early life ==
Urban was born in 1848 in Frankfurt, Germany. He studied architecture at the Berlin School of Art. After a year's mandatory service in the Imperial German Army, he moved to Paris, where he designed several public-use buildings. While there, he met William G. Preston, an architect from Boston. Preston offered Urban employment at his practice, and Urban moved to the United States in 1883. His three brothers and three sisters also moved to the Boston area. It was there that Urban met his future wife, Ella, the daughter of a Boston cabinetmaker.

== Career ==
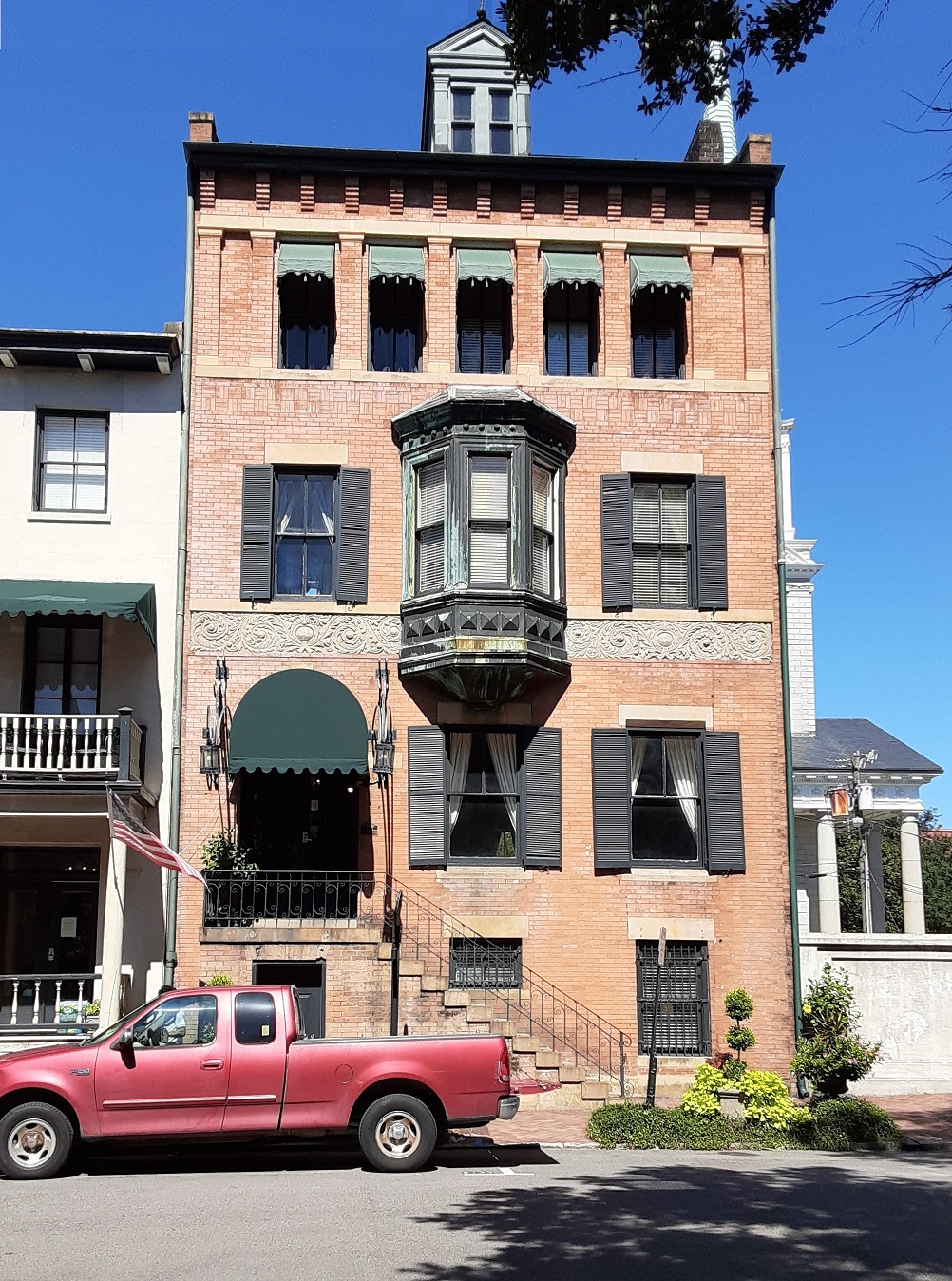
Honora Foley Property, Savannah

On his honeymoon in December 1888, Urban visited Savannah, Georgia, to oversee the construction of the DeSoto. It was completed in 1890 (narrowly avoiding damage in the previous year's fire) and closed in 1965, when it was demolished. He decided to remain in Savannah, initially living at 163 Liberty Street, and oversaw the construction of the Preston-designed Independent Presbyterian Church, which stands at the corner of Bull Street and Oglethorpe Avenue. The previous iteration burned down in April 1889.

He designed Savannah's Provident Building in 1892, and moved his office there upon its completion.

In 1893, Urban designed Beth Eden Baptist Church, in Savannah's Whitefield Square.

He designed the Foley House Inn, in Chippewa Square at 14 West Hull Street, in 1896.

After Chatham Academy burned in 1899, Urban's plan to rebuild it was accepted. It was dedicated in 1908.

In 1901, he designed the Woman's Christian Temperance Union building on Liberty Street.

After 1912, he designed a "modern" building to replace Savannah's Exchange Bank on Broughton Street.

He retired, aged 67, in 1915, partly due to the anti-German mindset introduced during World War I.

== Personal life ==
Urban married Ella Francis Willis, a native of Charlestown, Boston, in 1888. They had two known children―Elfrida (b. 1896) and Doris (b. 1897)―who were both born after Urban's move to Georgia.

After deciding to stay in Savannah, Urban's family moved from Liberty Street to thew newly constructed 419 East Taylor Street. The family's doctor was Herman William Hesse.

== Death ==
Urban died in 1927, aged 78, from a cerebral hemorrhage. A funeral was held at 627 East 40th Street in Savannah, the home of Elfrida and her husband, Charles Theus, after which he was interred in Savannah's Laurel Grove Cemetery. His widow survived him by fourteen years. She was buried beside him upon her death in 1951, aged 89.
