= Samuel Benjamin Morse =

African-American educator

- Born: December 6, 1852; Lacy, Georgia, U.S.
- Died: May 30, 1909 (aged 56); Savannah, Georgia, U.S.
- Resting place: Laurel Grove Cemetery, Savannah, Georgia, U.S.

Samuel Benjamin Morse (December 6, 1852 – May 30, 1909) was an African American educator. He was one of the first students admitted to Atlanta University (now Clark Atlanta University). He was the founding director of the Department of Music at Savannah State University and was prominent in civics, commerce, education and politics in Savannah, Georgia.

== Early life ==
Samuel Benjamin Morse was born into enslavement in Lacy, McIntosh County, Georgia, in 1852, the only child of Samuel Gordon Morse and Patience Mary Morse. His father was enslaved as a coachman. Both of his parents had been born into enslavement in Georgia, his mother in Savannah and his father in McIntosh County. Their enslaver was William H. Bennett, a wealthy planter with plantations in McIntosh and Chatham counties and enslaver of 128 people.

In 1853, the family were returned to Savannah, where his mother joined the Second African Baptist Church; she was baptized in the Savannah River below the gas works of the newly established Savannah Gas Light Company, which was just beginning to illuminate city streets and fine homes in the city.

The family was in the city during Savannah's yellow fever epidemic of 1854. The Savannah Board of Health first reported yellow fever deaths on August 10, 1854. The Savannah newspapers began publishing daily reports on yellow fever deaths, and by the end of the month the toll reached 60 dead per week. The outbreak of yellow fever was terrifying for the inhabitants. While most infected people experience fever, headache, chills, aches and pains, nausea, and vomiting over a period of three to 14 days, in some otherwise healthy people the disease progresses very rapidly and death may occur within two days of the first sign of symptoms. About 15% of cases become acute with liver damage resulting in yellowing of the skin (jaundice), hence the disease name. Severe internal hemoraging occurs culminating in the "black vomit" of partially digested blood - the most indicative symptom of fatally toxic yellow fever. There were so many yellow fever deaths in Savannah that the city's carpenters could not keep up with the demand for coffins. Approximately two thirds of white residents fled the city in panic and by early September 1854 the town appeared deserted. Most of the enslaved population was forced to remain in the city as caretakers of their enslavers' property. Those that remained in the city were cut off from the world. A resident wrote, "for several weeks it was difficult to get anything to eat; the bakers were either sick or dead...the markets were closed." Farmers ceased deliveries of produce and meat, and ships shunned the harbor. Of the 5,583 African Americans and 6,313 whites who remained in Savannah in October 1854, the majority contracted yellow fever. By the end of November the disease had subsided. Over the 15 week course of the epidemic the known death toll was at least 650 people.

By the start of the Civil War, the Morses were enslaved in McIntosh County, Georgia. In early 1862, the family escaped from Darien, Georgia, a town on the Altamaha River, and reached United States Navy gunboats stationed at St. Simons Island and Doboy Sound, which were the USS Uncas, USS Wamsutta, and USS Potomska. The Morses were taken with other escaped African Americans to Beaufort, South Carolina, which had been recaptured by U.S. forces in the Battle of Port Royal in November 1861.

His father enlisted in Company I, 33rd United States Colored Infantry at Port Royal, South Carolina, on December 19, 1862, and was immediately appointed 1st Sergeant. Samuel and his mother were camp followers during the campaigns around Charleston and Fort Wagner, during which Mrs. Morse worked as a washerwoman. On June 11, 1863, Morse's regiment and another African American regiment, the 54th Massachusetts Infantry, raided and burned the town of Darien. This controversial action was depicted in the 1989 Academy Award-winning film Glory. In late 1864 and early 1865, the 33rd US Colored Infantry occupied various positions in and around Charleston. In March 1865, the regiment joined the occupation force at Savannah, and, in June 1865, moved to occupy Augusta, Georgia. They remained on duty there, and at various points until mustering out January 31, 1866. With the exception of ten days on furlough, Sergeant Morse was present for duty every day until discharged.

In February 1865, after the capture and occupation of Savannah by United States forces under the command of General William T. Sherman, the Morse family returned to the city, where the father continued to serve as Sergeant of Company I, 33rd U.S. Colored Infantry. After discharge from the United States Army, he found employment in Savannah as a teamster and later obtained a license to sell beer, wine and liquor.

In 1868, Morse went to Athens, Georgia, to attend Knox Institute, a private elementary and secondary school for African American students which was funded in part by the Freedman's Bureau. On October 6, 1869, Morse was one of the first men to enter Atlanta University (now Clark Atlanta University), registering on the institution's opening day. Among his instructors were Lucy E. Case and Thomas N. Chase. The program of study was modeled on that of Yale University, and in 1876, Morse stood with the first class of African Americans to earn a college degree in a southern state. He later funded a scholarship at his alma mater.

== Career ==
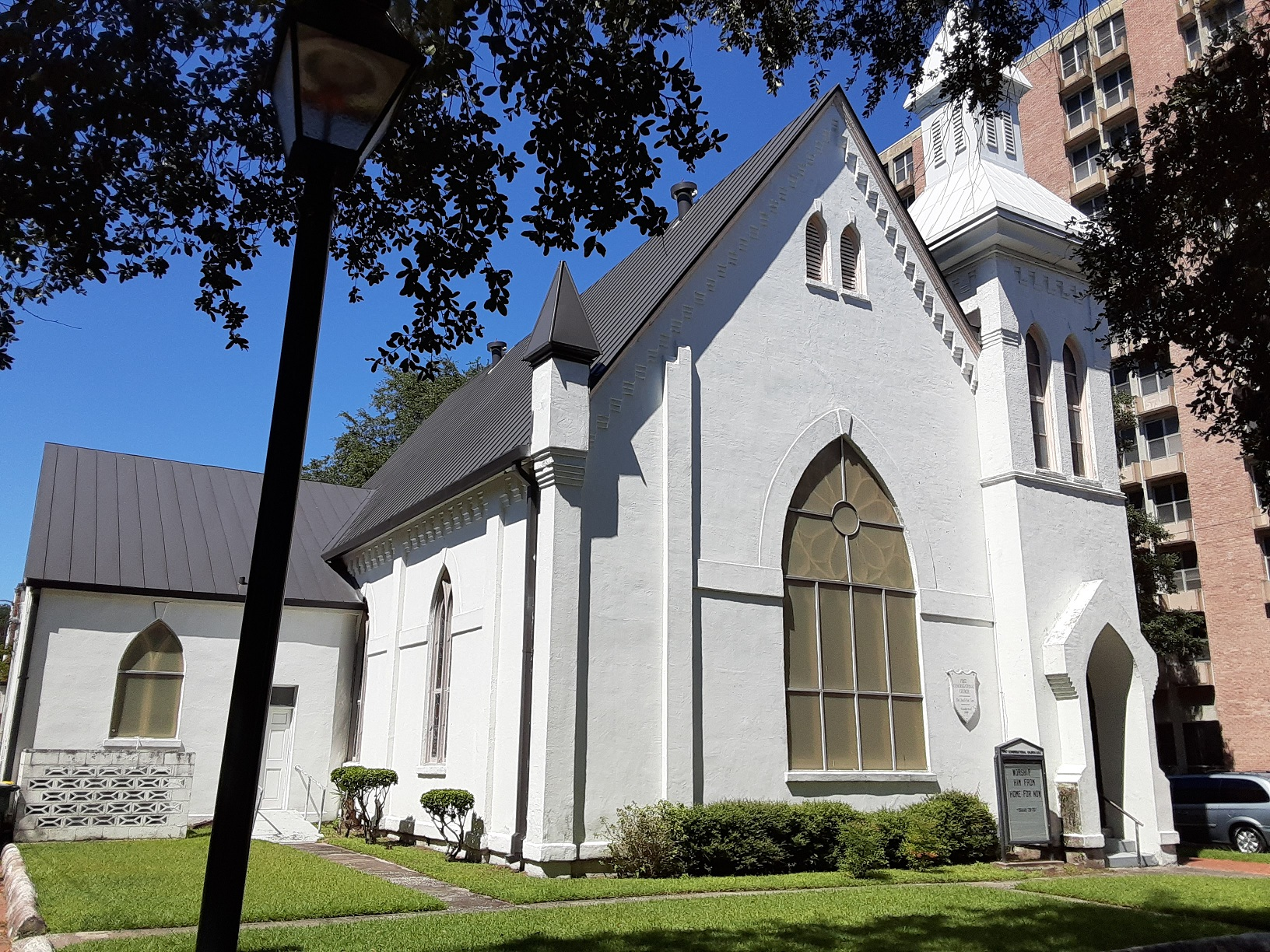
First Congregational Church in Savannah, at which Morse served as musical director and organist

After graduation, returned to Knox Institute as a teacher. He then taught in the African American public schools of Savannah and Brunswick, Georgia. Returning to Savannah, he joined the First Congregational Church and served a number of years as musical director and organist. For nearly ten years he was the Sunday School Superintendent, and served nearly twenty years on the church's board of trustees.

In 1880, he was employed in the federal government, at the United States Customhouse in Savannah. He was forced out of public service by the administration of Grover Cleveland but returned to work at the Customhouse when Cleveland left office in 1890.

He was elected as a Georgia delegate to the 1892 Republican National Convention in Minneapolis, Minnesota, and served as a Georgia delegate to two subsequent national conventions.

In addition to serving as the director of music at the First Congregational Church of Savannah, Morse continued to teach music throughout his life. He gave private lessons in organ, piano and voice at a rate of $0.75 per hour. In 1887, he was a visiting director of music at the Clinton Street African Methodist Episcopal Church in New Orleans, Louisiana, where he also offered music lessons to the public. In Savannah, he formed the Samuel B. Morse Club, a choir that performed at community events.

Between 1893 and 1894, Morse studied at and graduated from the New England Conservatory of Music in Boston, Massachusetts. He was hired in 1894 as the founding director of the Department of Music at the Georgia State Industrial College for Colored Youths at Savannah (now Savannah State University).

Morse acquired considerable commercial and residential property in and around Savannah. He owned a number of one- and two-story houses, tenement buildings and commercial buildings, as well as the Troy Steam Laundry and Morse's Hall entertainment venue.

He resided with his parents until their deaths in 1875 and 1903.

== Death ==
Morse died in 1909, aged 56, in Savannah after an extended illness. Funeral services were held at the First Congregational Church and the burial was in Savannah's Laurel Grove Cemetery South.
