= Beth Eden Baptist Church (Savannah, Georgia) =

Baptist church in Savannah, Georgia

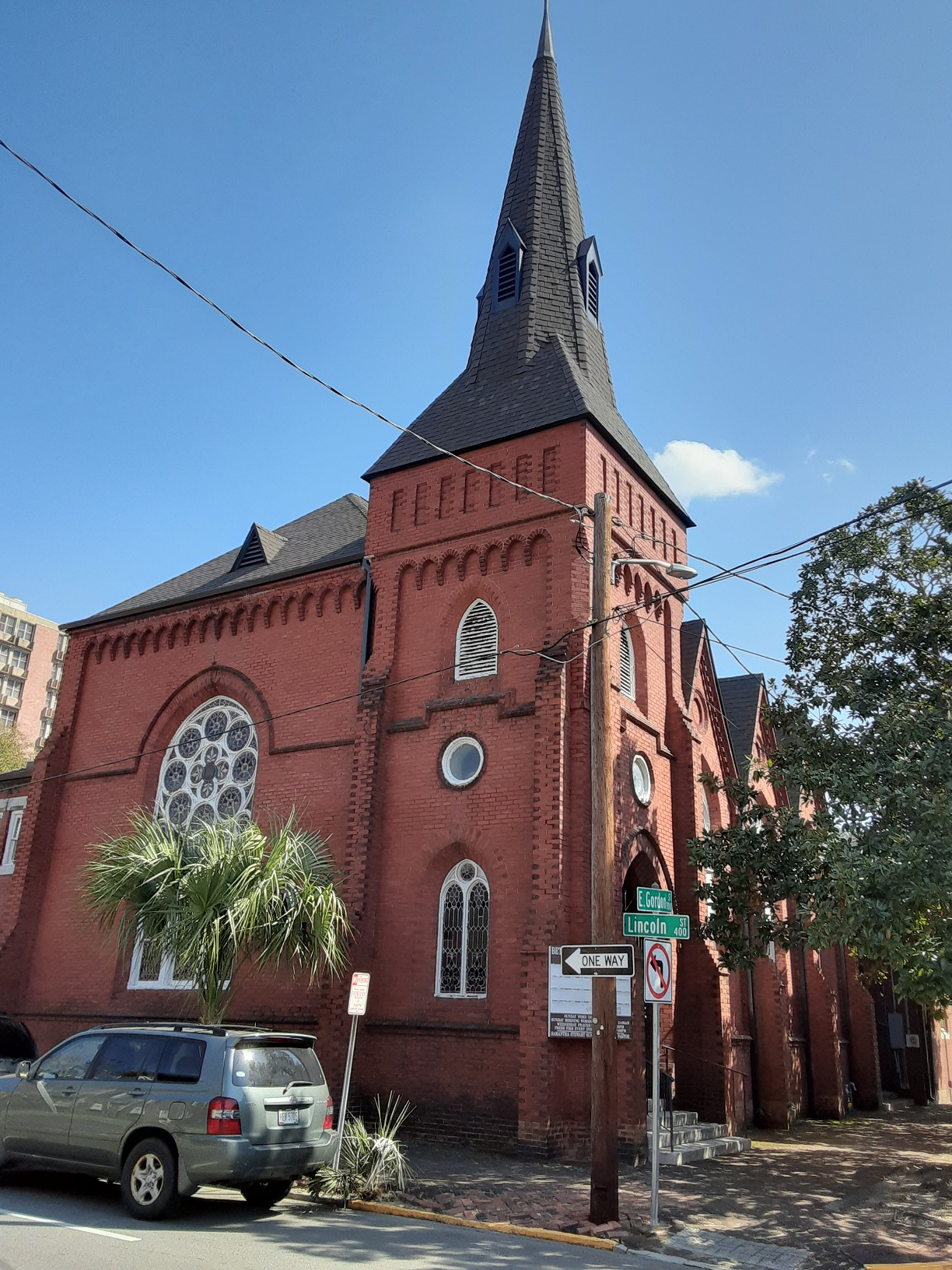
- Pictured in 2022
- Beth Eden Baptist Church
- 32.070267°N 81.09127°W
- Address: 302 East Gordon Street, Savannah, Georgia, U.S.
- Website: www.bethedensav.com

History
- Founded: 1893 (133 years ago)

Architecture
- Architect: Henry C. Urban

Clergy
- Pastor: Samantha Stewart Sunkins

Beth Eden Baptist Church is an American Baptist church built in 1893. It stands on East Gordon Street, in Whitefield Square, Savannah, Georgia. The congregation was formed in 1889 but the origins of the church go back to the Savannah River around a century earlier.

The church was designed by Henry C. Urban, a Frankfurt-born architect. It is an affiliate of Savannah's Second African Baptist Church.
