= Whitefield Square (Savannah, Georgia) =

Public square in Savannah, Georgia

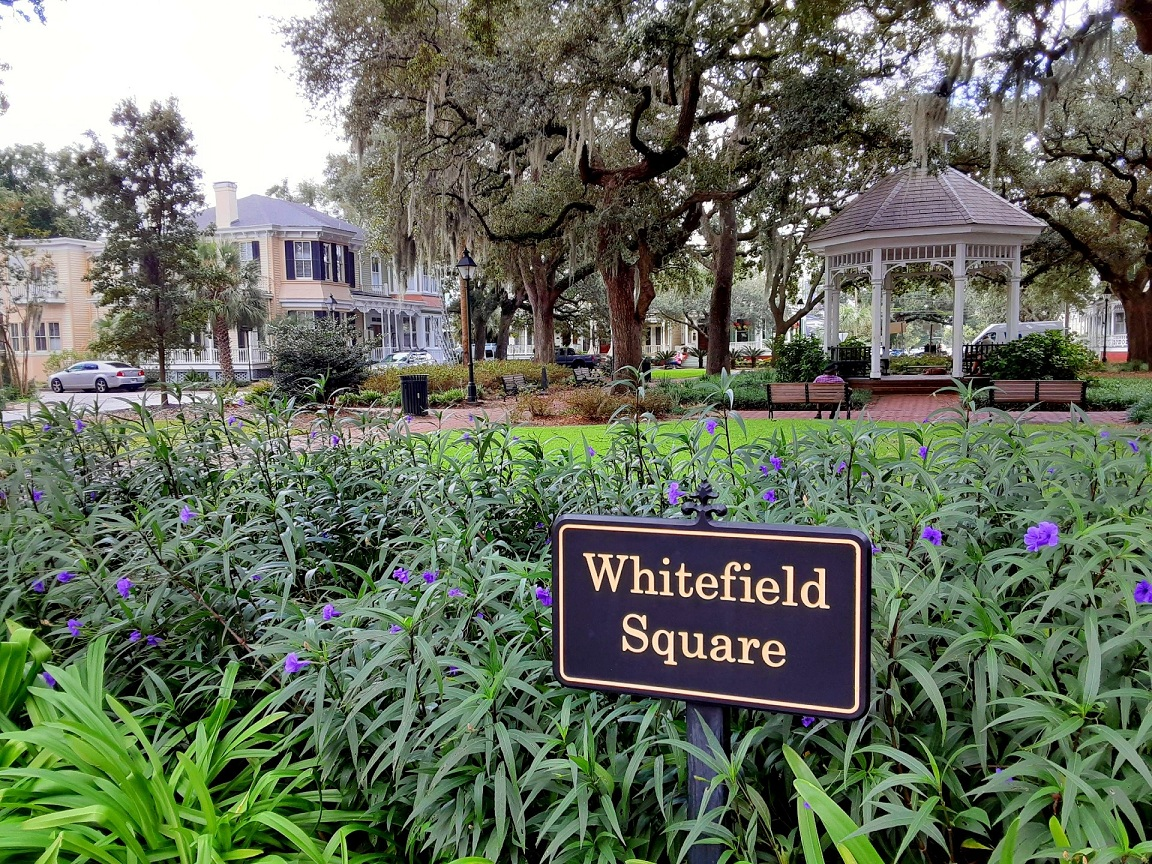
- Whitefield Square and its gazebo
- Interactive map of Whitefield Square
- Namesake: Rev. George Whitefield
- Maintained by: City of Savannah
- Location: Savannah, Georgia, U.S.
- Coordinates: 32.0701°N 81.0904°W
- North: Habersham Street
- East: East Wayne Street
- South: Habersham Street
- West: East Wayne Street

Construction
- Completion: 1851 (175 years ago)

Whitefield Square (/ˈhwɪtfiːld/) is one of the 22 squares of Savannah, Georgia, United States. It is located in the southernmost row of the city's five rows of squares, on Habersham Street and East Wayne Street, and was the final square laid out, in 1851. It is south of Troup Square and east of Taylor Square in the southeastern corner of Savannah's grid of squares. The oldest building on the square is at 412–414 East Taylor Street, which dates to 1855.

== Description ==
A notable building facing the western side of the square is the First Congregational Church. Other prominent, though 20th-century, buildings are the Rose-of-Sharon Apartments (which occupies the entire northwestern tything block) and, across Habersham Street, the Red Cross Building. The square has a gazebo in its center.

== History ==
Andrew Bryan, the founder of the First African Baptist Church, was buried in the square, as was Henry Cunningham, the first minister of the Second African Baptist Church.

The square, and its immediate vicinity, was once a burial ground for both negro slaves and free persons of all colors. The original 1805 burial ground included the northern end of today's square, a half block to the north and one block to the west, It was extended in 1812 to the northwest and in 1818 to the south, this time incorporating the southern end of today's square.

In 2025, a radar survey discovered what was believed to be around eighty graves, leading to suspicions that the long-held belief that not all of the burials were exhumed after the "Negro Burial Ground" was closed in 1844. A new burial site was established near the intersection of Gaston and Abercorn streets. That was used until 1852, at which point a section for the burials of persons of color was created within Laurel Grove Cemetery. Three years later, Savannah City Council permitted the city marshal to remove remains from the "Negro Burial Ground" to Laurel Grove, but records to not make it clear whether removals were undertaken from the area encroaching onto Whitefield Square, the Gaston and Abercorn site, or both.

== Name ==
It is named in honor for Rev. George Whitefield (whose last name is pronounced Whitfield), founder of Bethesda Home for Boys (now known as Bethesda Academy) in the 18th century, and still in existence on the south side of the city.

== Dedication ==
Namesake	Image	Note
Rev. George Whitefield		The square is named for Rev. George Whitefield, founder of Bethesda Home for Boys.

== Constituent buildings ==
Each building below is in one of the eight blocks around the square composed of four residential "tything" blocks and four civic ("trust") blocks, now known as the Oglethorpe Plan. They are listed with construction years where known.

Northwestern civic/trust block

- First Congregational Church, 421 Habersham Street (1895)

Southwestern civic/trust block

- 431 Habersham Street (1886)
- Mary Dwyer Property, 427–431 Habersham Street (1886)
- Beth Eden Baptist Church, 302 East Gordon Street (1893)

Southwestern residential/tything block

- John Entelman Property (1), 433 Habersham Street (1896)
- 435 Habersham Street (1896)
- John Entelman Property (2), 437 Habersham Street (1897)
- 439 Habersham Street (1897)
- Henry Herman House, 313 East Gordon Street (1861)
- 307–309 East Gordon Street (1869)
- 436–442 Lincoln Street (1867)

Northeastern residential/tything block

- John McCluskey House, 408 East Taylor Street (1891)
- Andrew Nelson House, 410 East Taylor Street (1860)
- George Ash Duplex, 412–414 East Taylor Street (1855) – oldest building on the square
- 415A–D Price Street (1876)

Northeastern civic/tything block

- 415–419 East Taylor Street (1888)
- 424–426 Habersham Street (1896)

Southeastern civic/tything block

- 430–432 Habersham Street (1886)
- Abraham Samuels Row House, 414–420 Habersham Street (1888)
- 407–413 East Gordon Street (1890)

Southeastern residential/tything block

- Sarah Sexton Property (1), 401 East Gordon Street (1901)
- Sarah Sexton Property (2), 403 East Gordon Street (1890)
- Emma Hunter House, 405 East Gordon Street (1895)
- 407–411 East Gordon Street (1890)
- 415–419 East Gordon Street (1886)
- Sarah Sexton Property (3), 440 Habersham Street (1902)

== Gallery ==
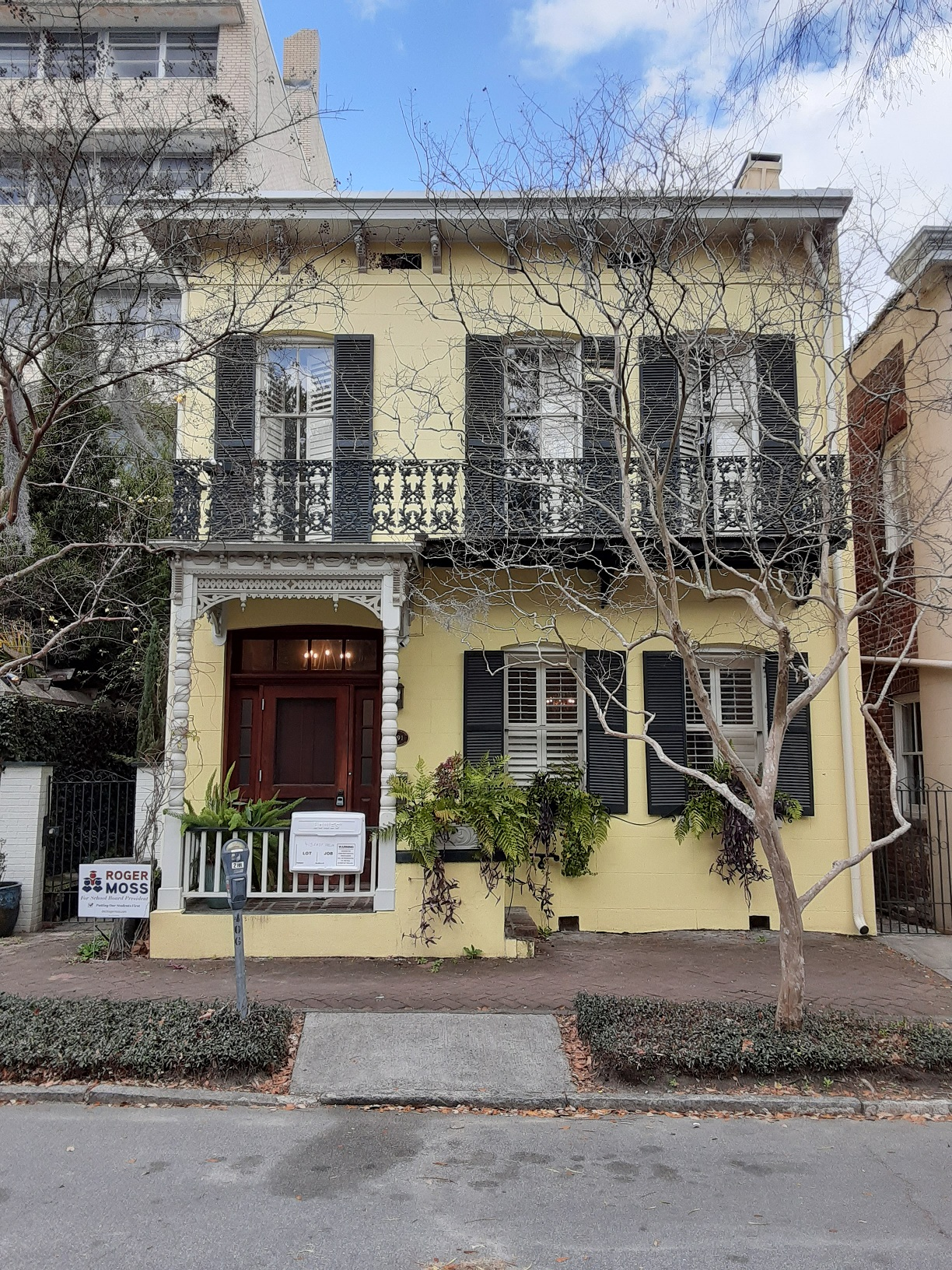
John McCluskey House, 408 East Taylor Street

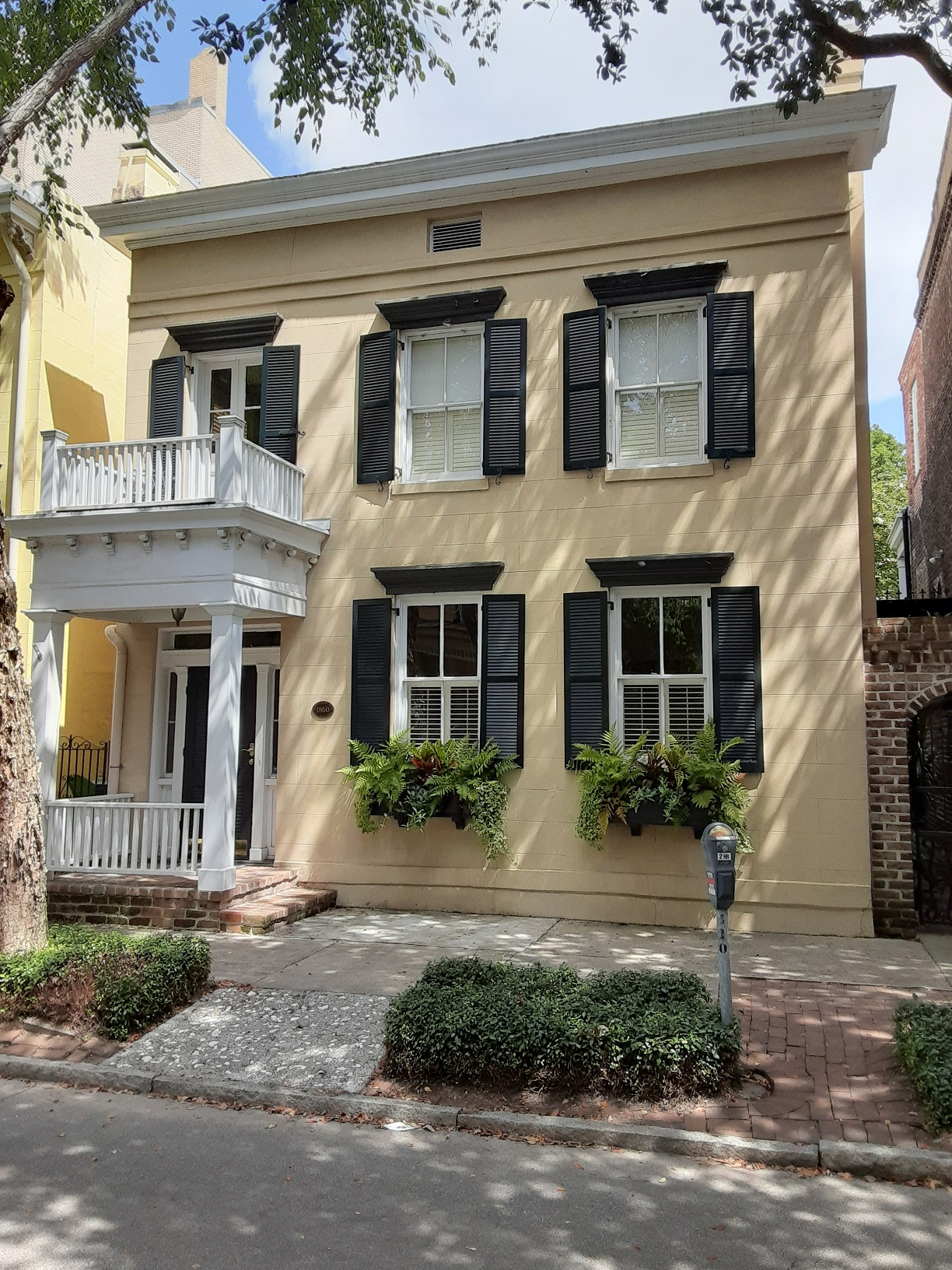
Andrew Nelson House, 410 East Taylor Street

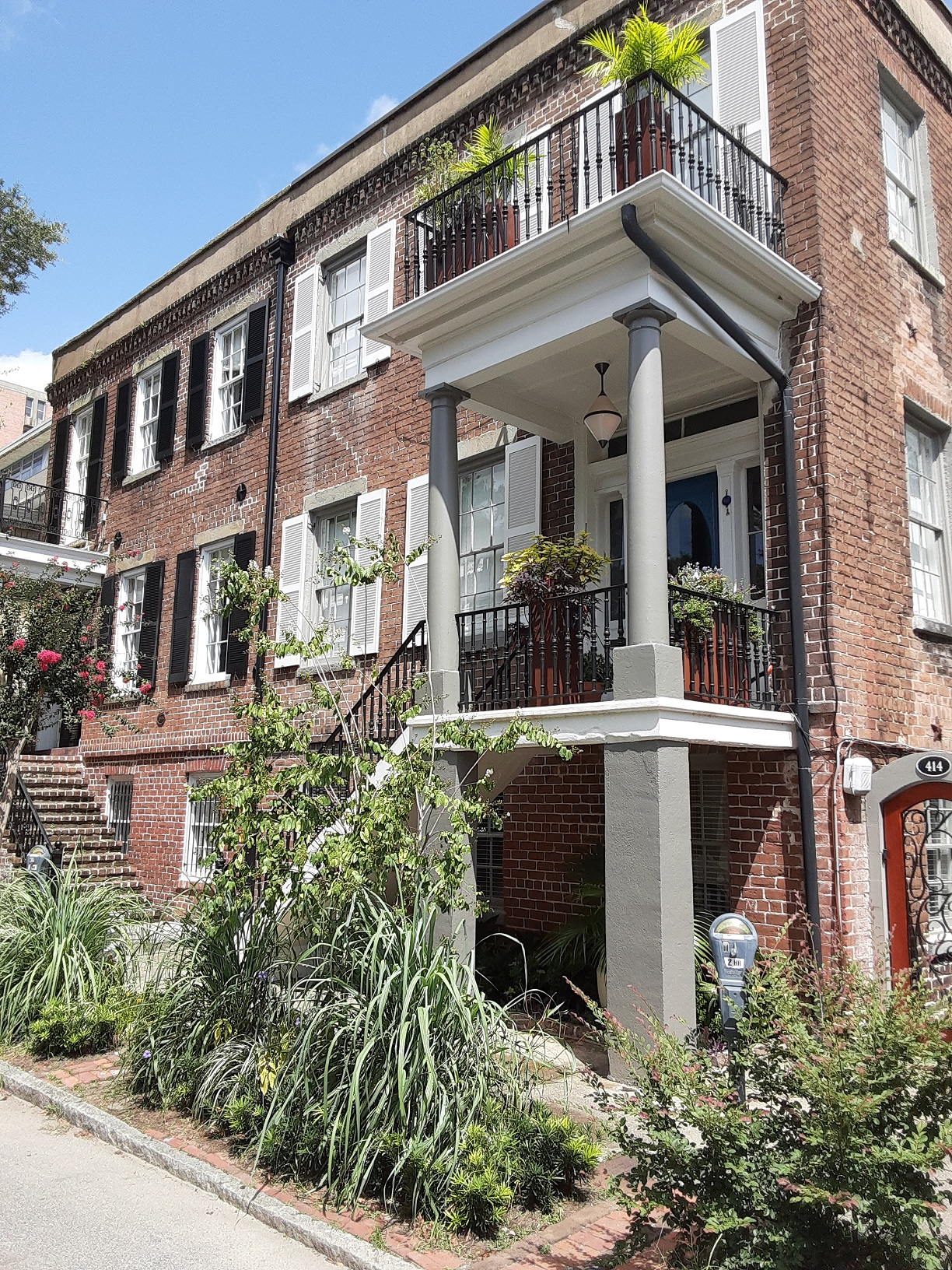
George Ash Duplex, 412–414 East Taylor Street

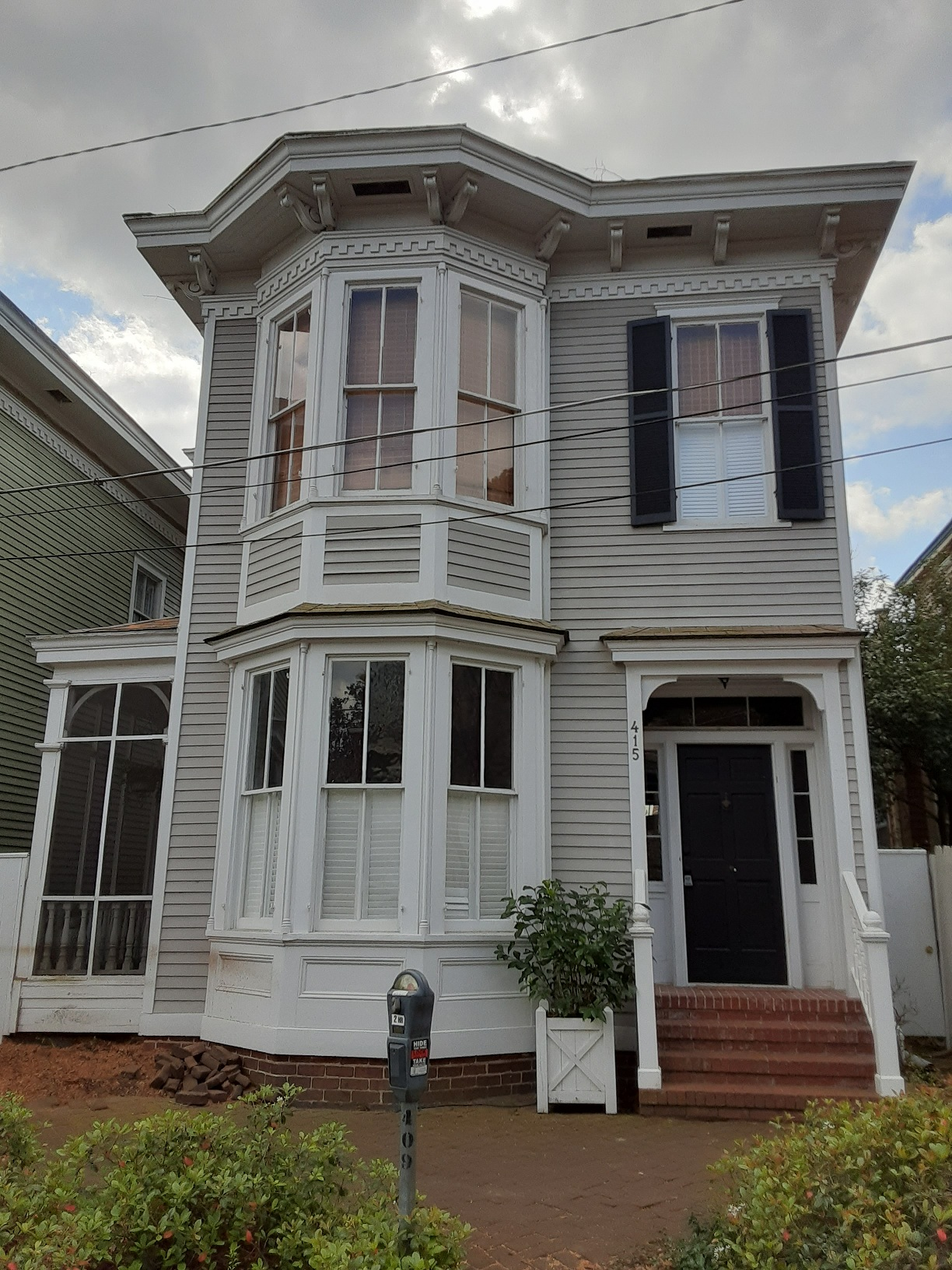
415 East Taylor Street

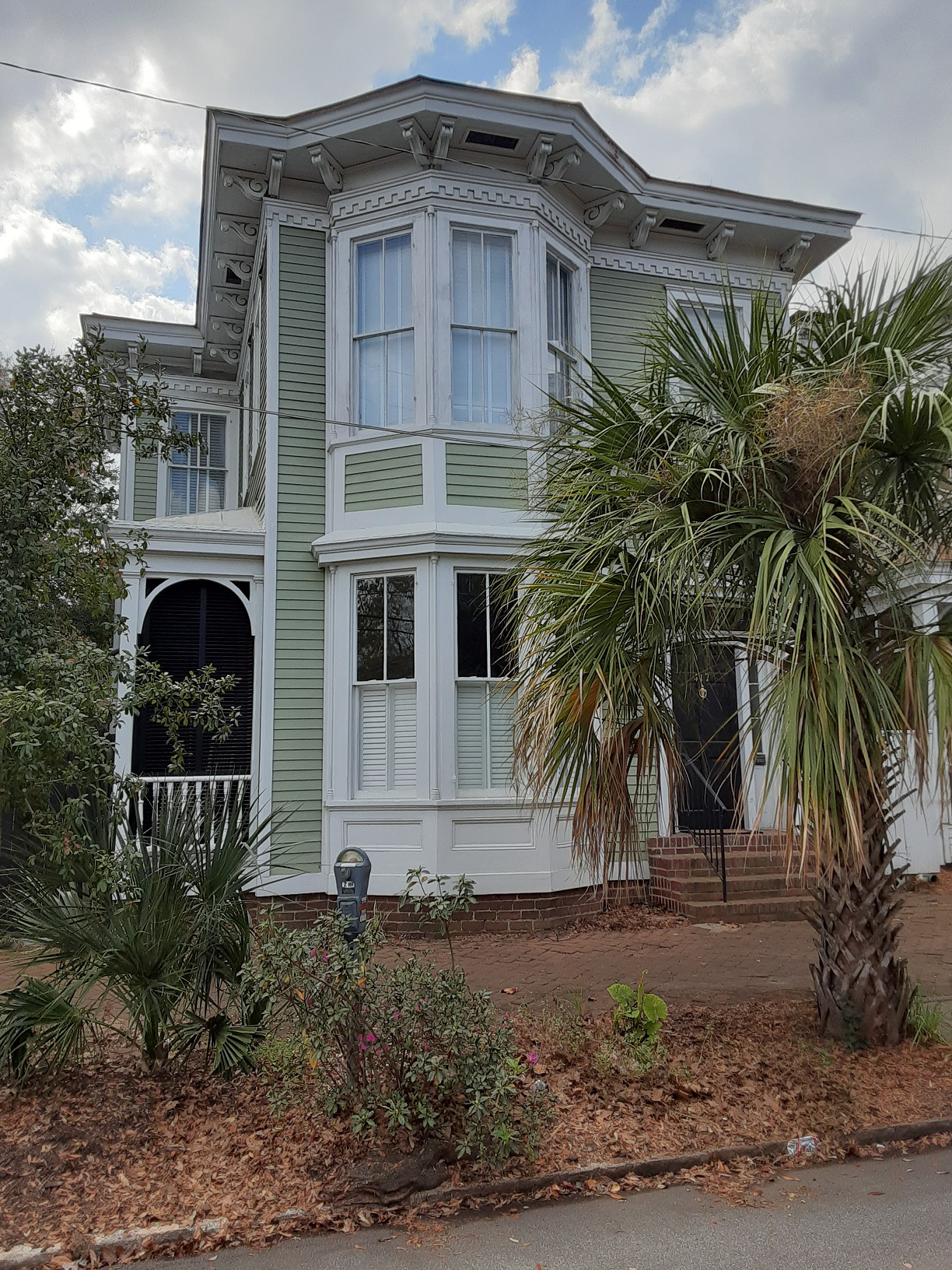
417 East Taylor Street

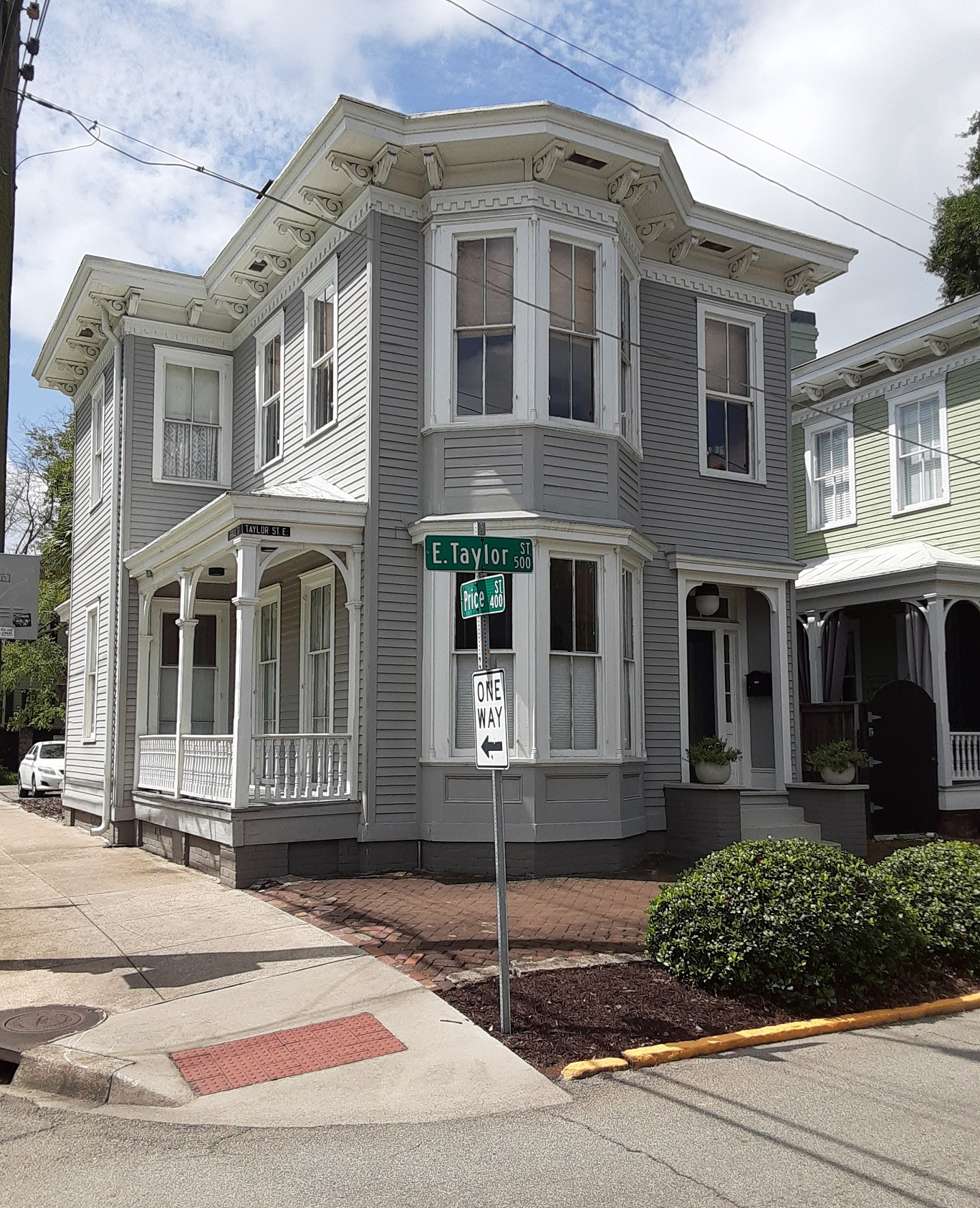
419 East Taylor Street

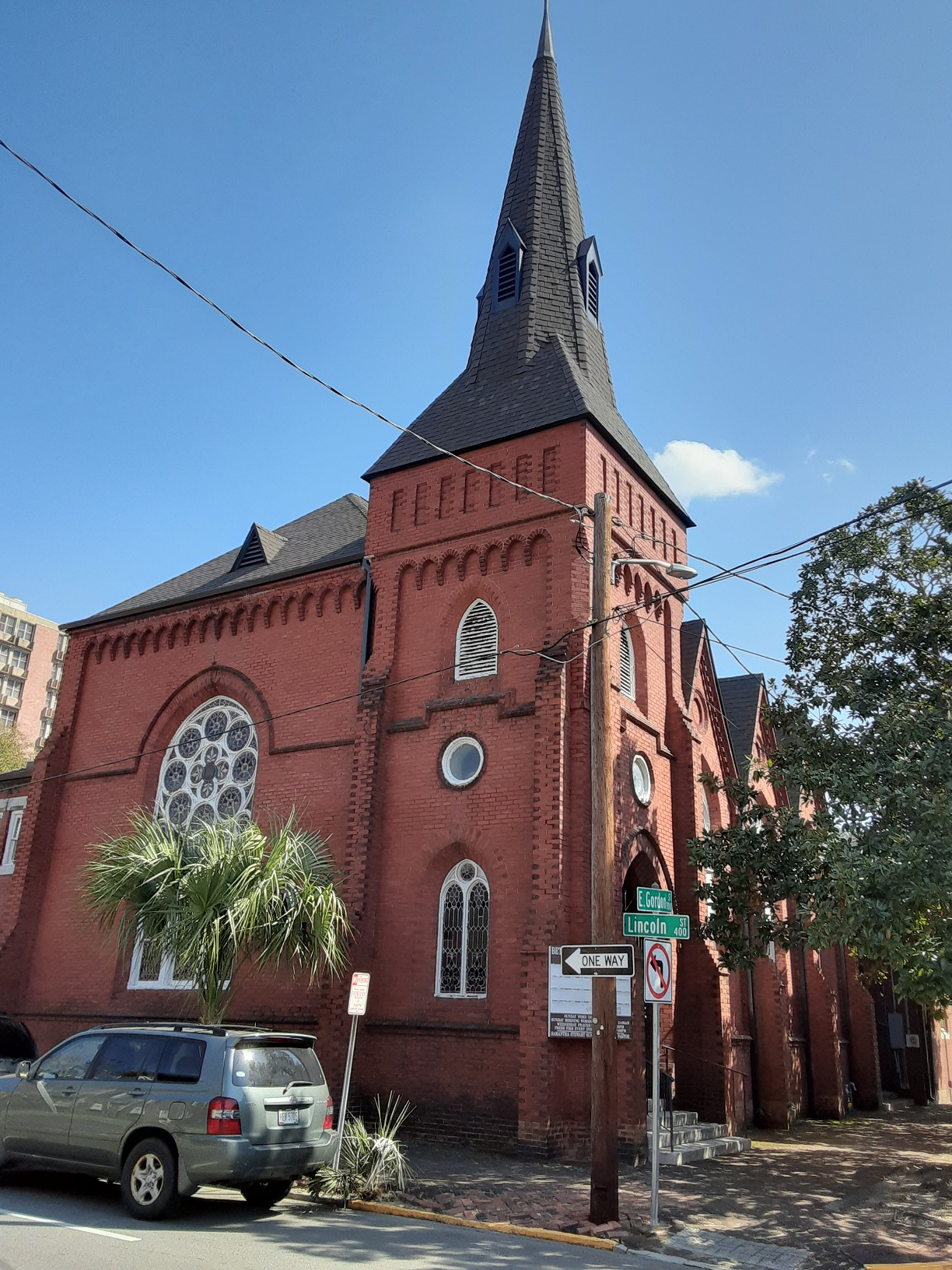
Beth Eden Baptist Church, 302 East Gordon Street

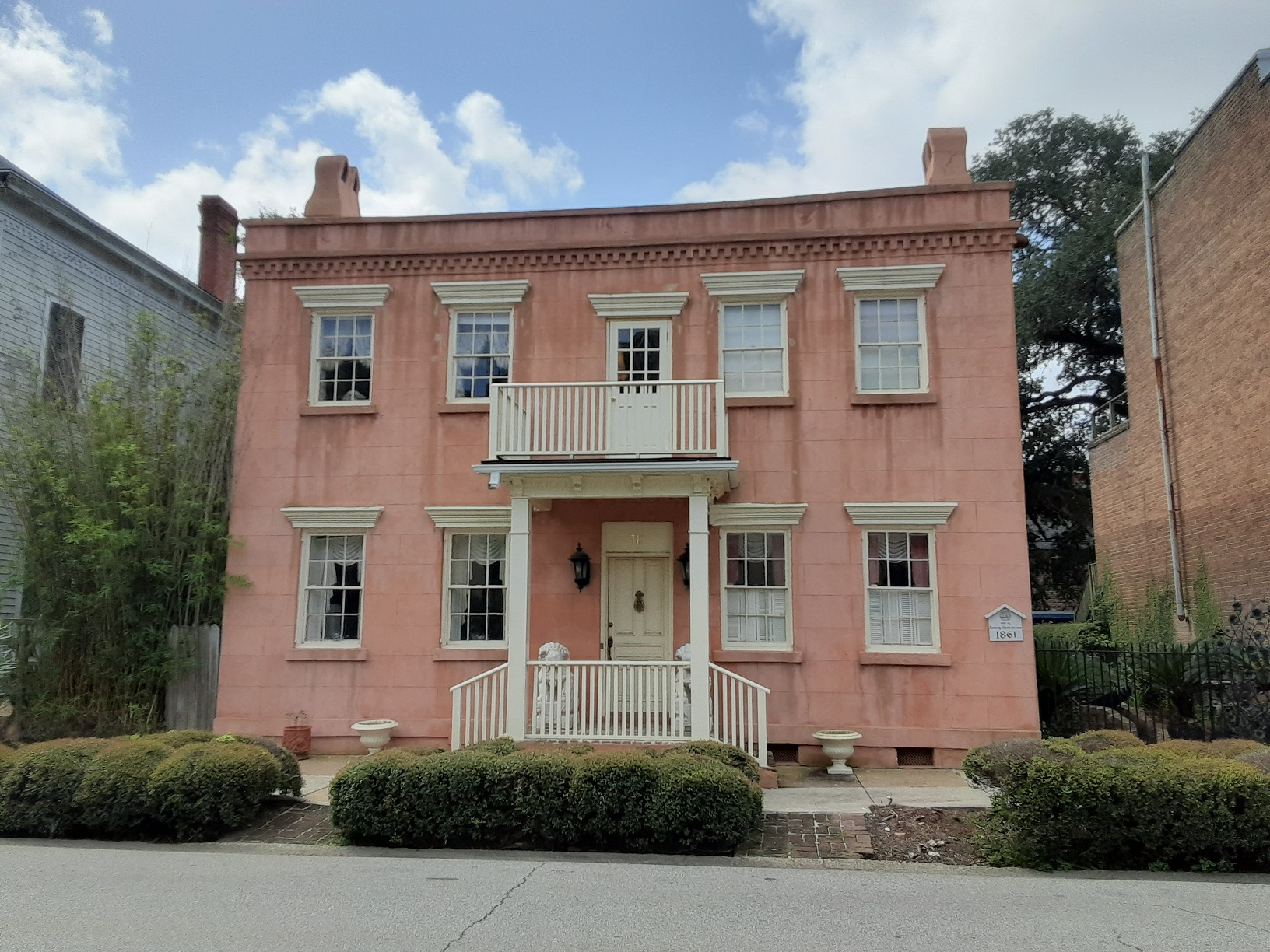
Henry Herman House, 313 East Gordon Street

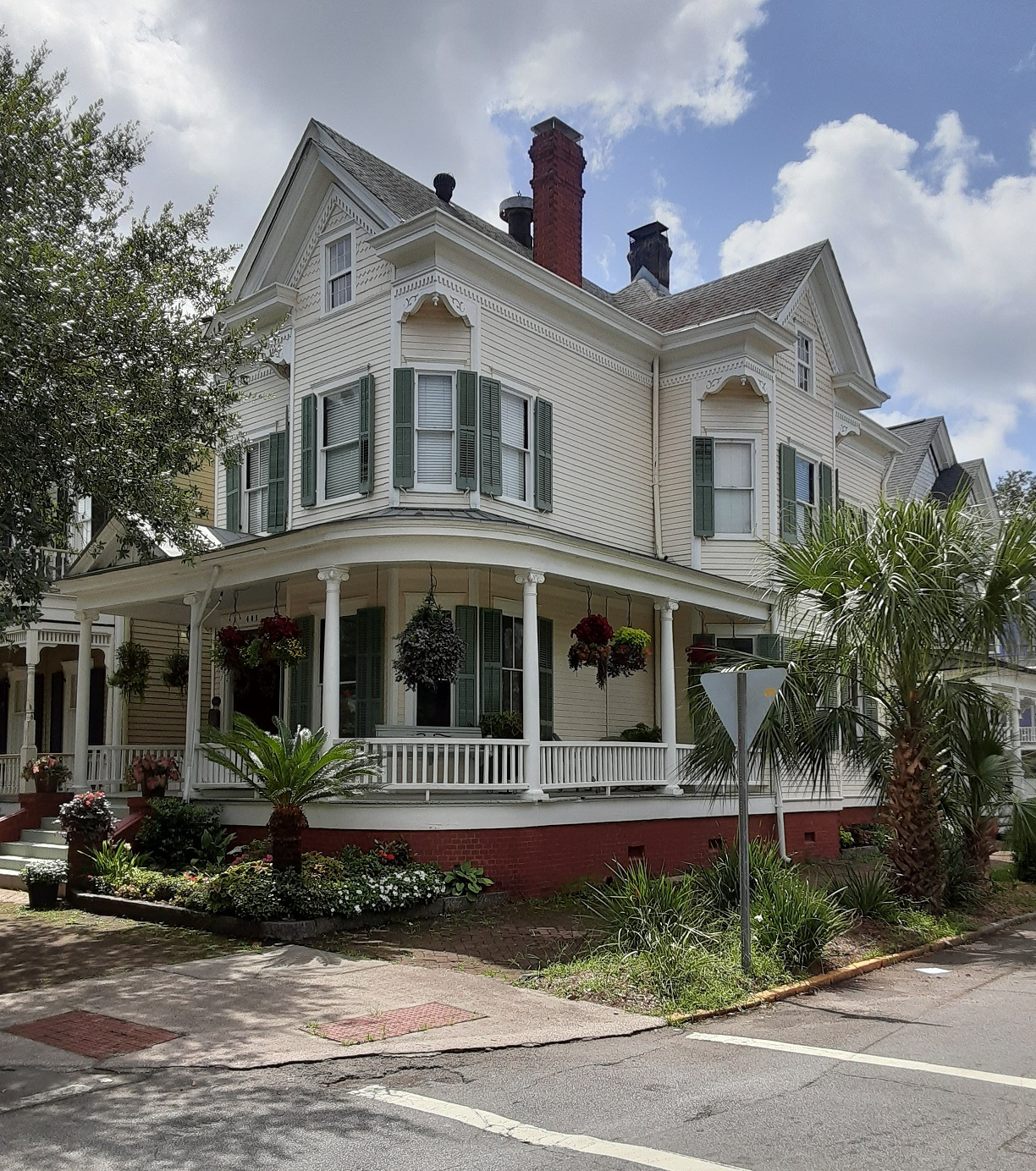
Sarah Sexton Property (1), 401 East Gordon Street

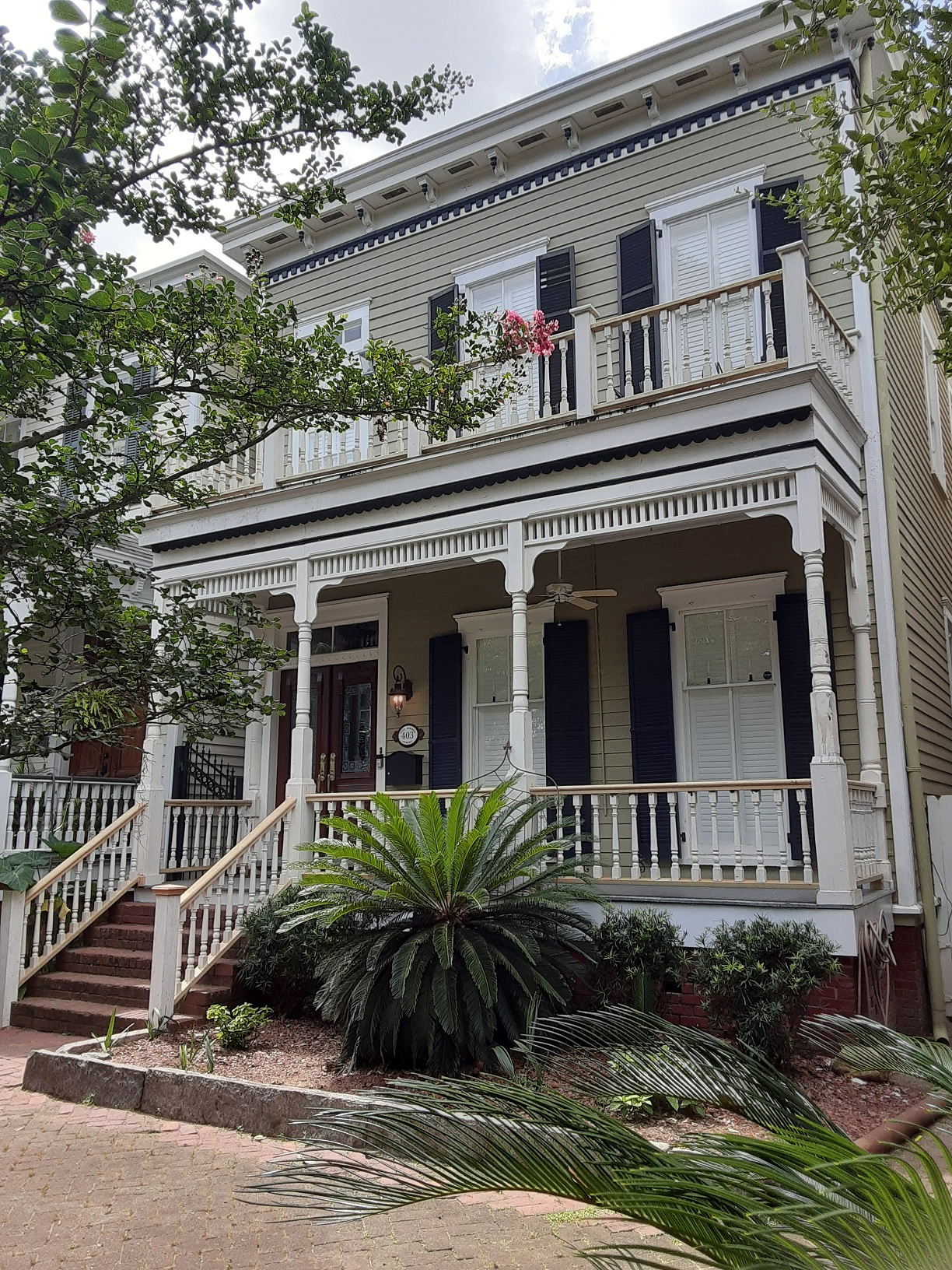
Sarah Sexton Property (2), 403 East Gordon Street

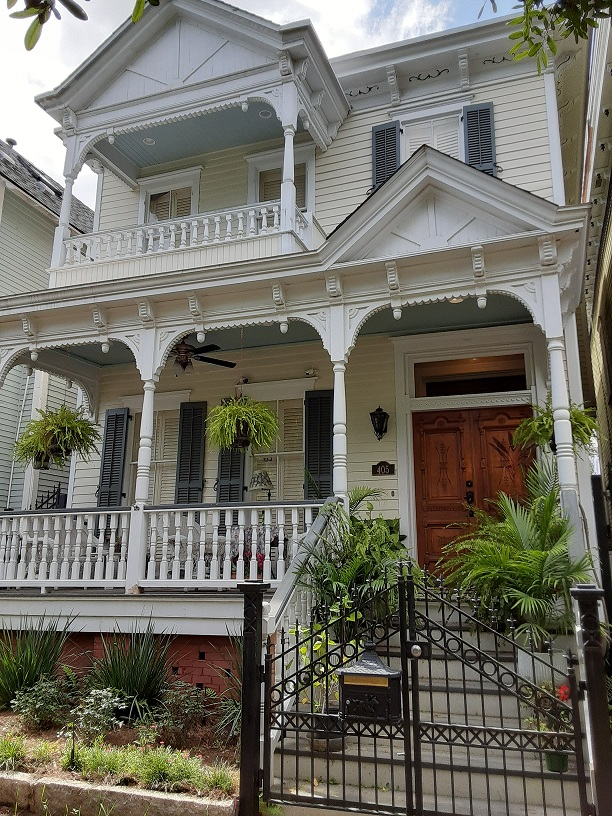
Emma Hunter House, 405 East Gordon Street

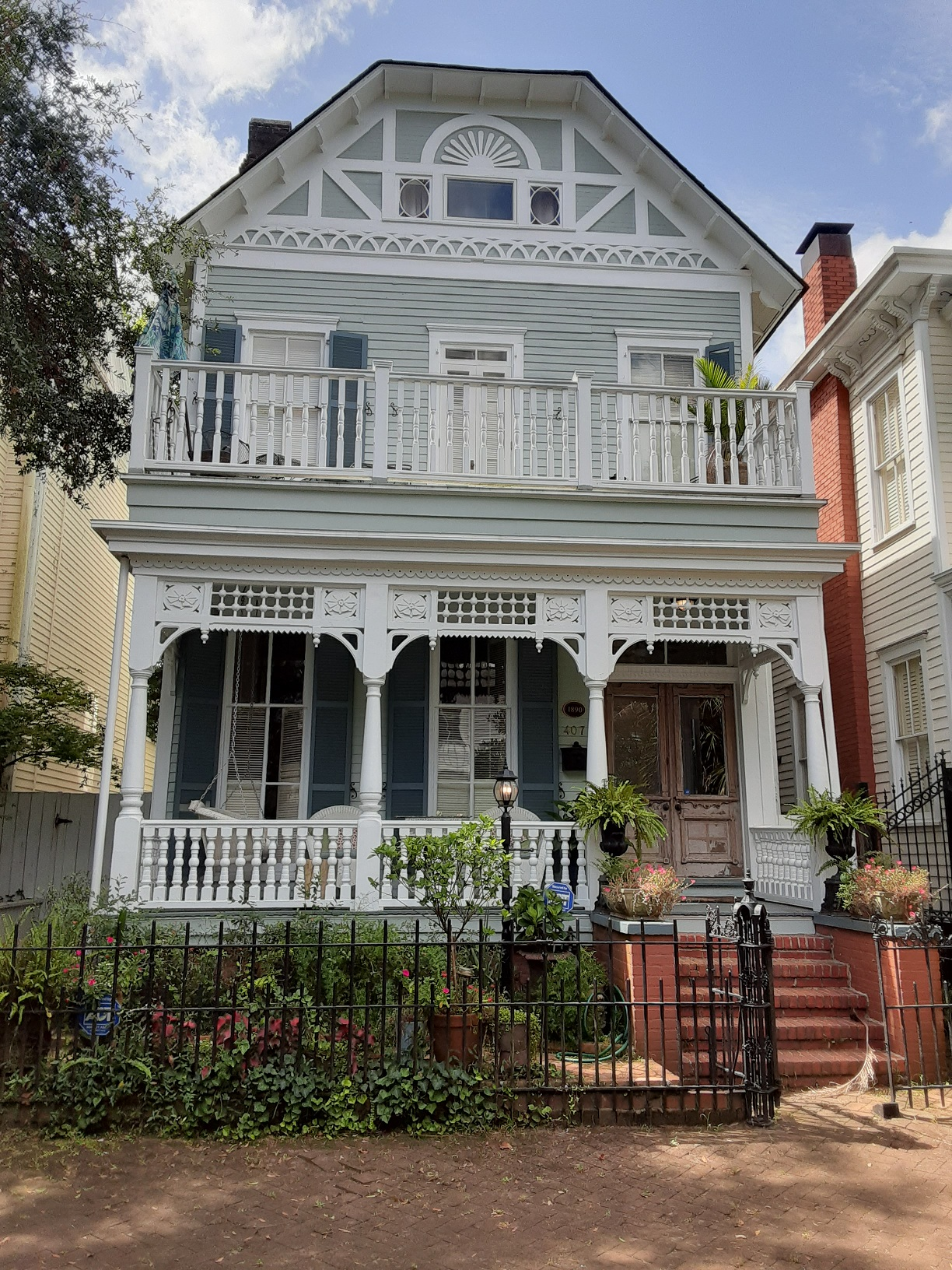
407 East Gordon Street

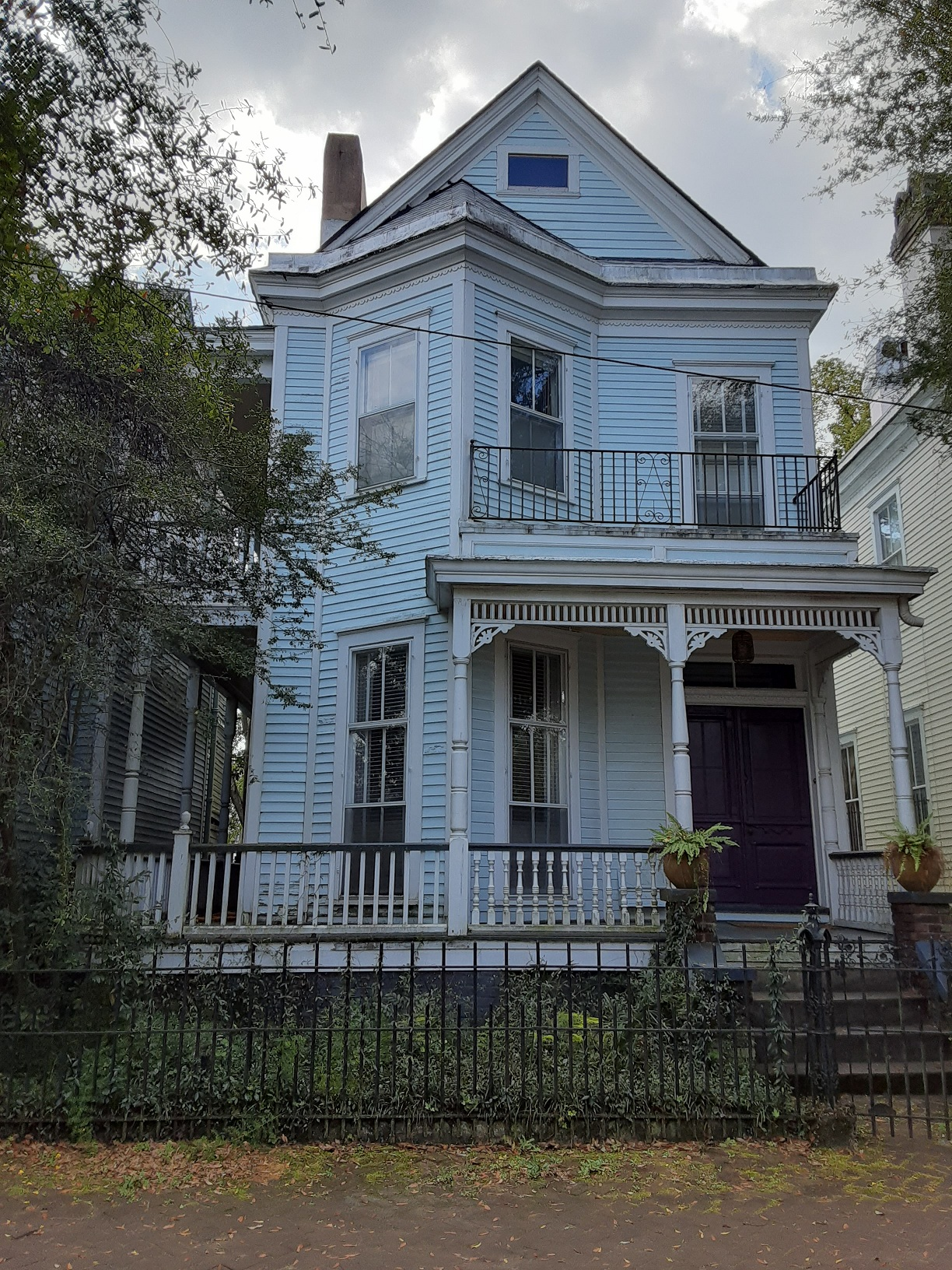
409 East Gordon Street

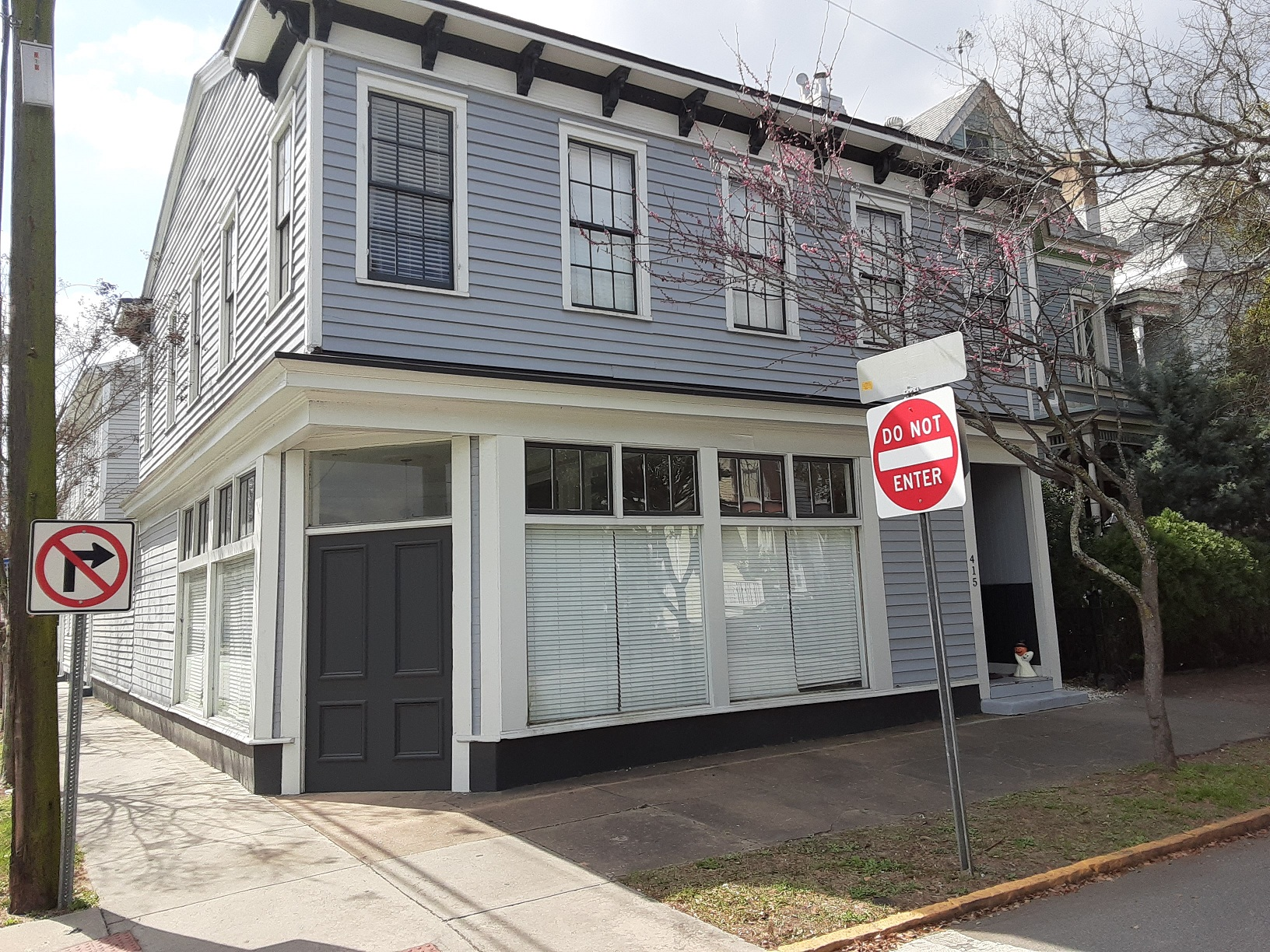
415–419 East Gordon Street

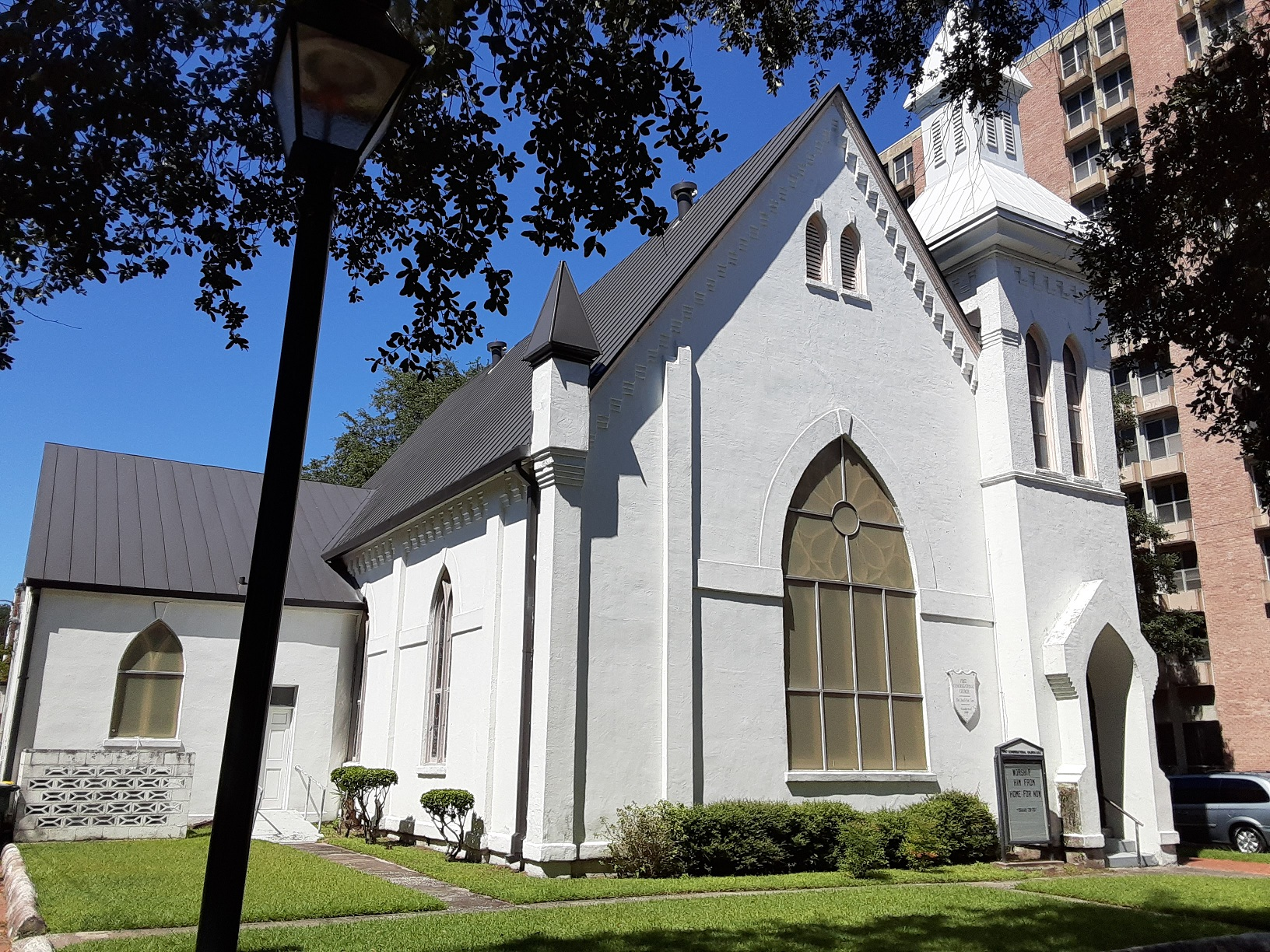
First Congregational Church, 421 Habersham Street

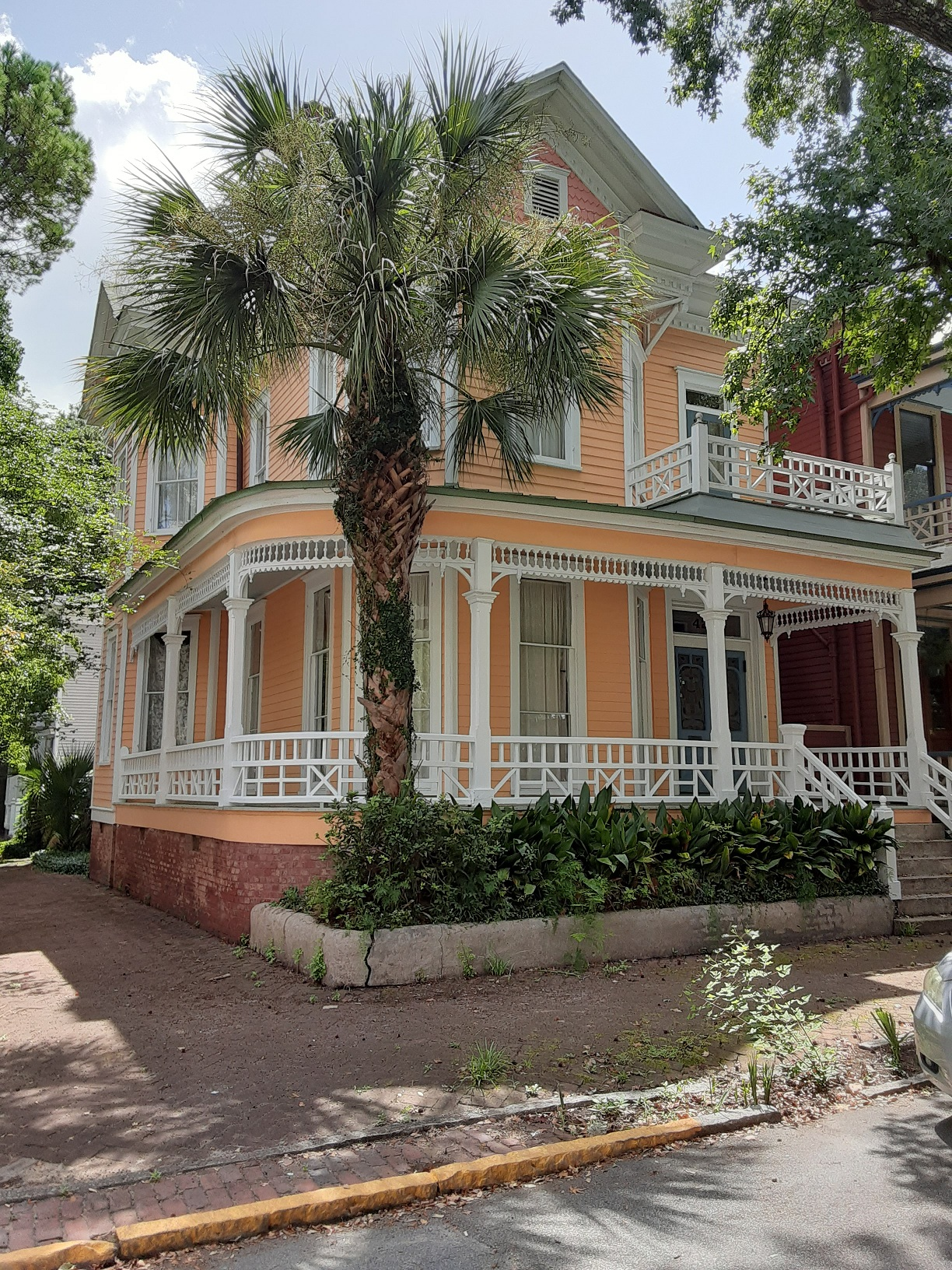
424 Habersham Street

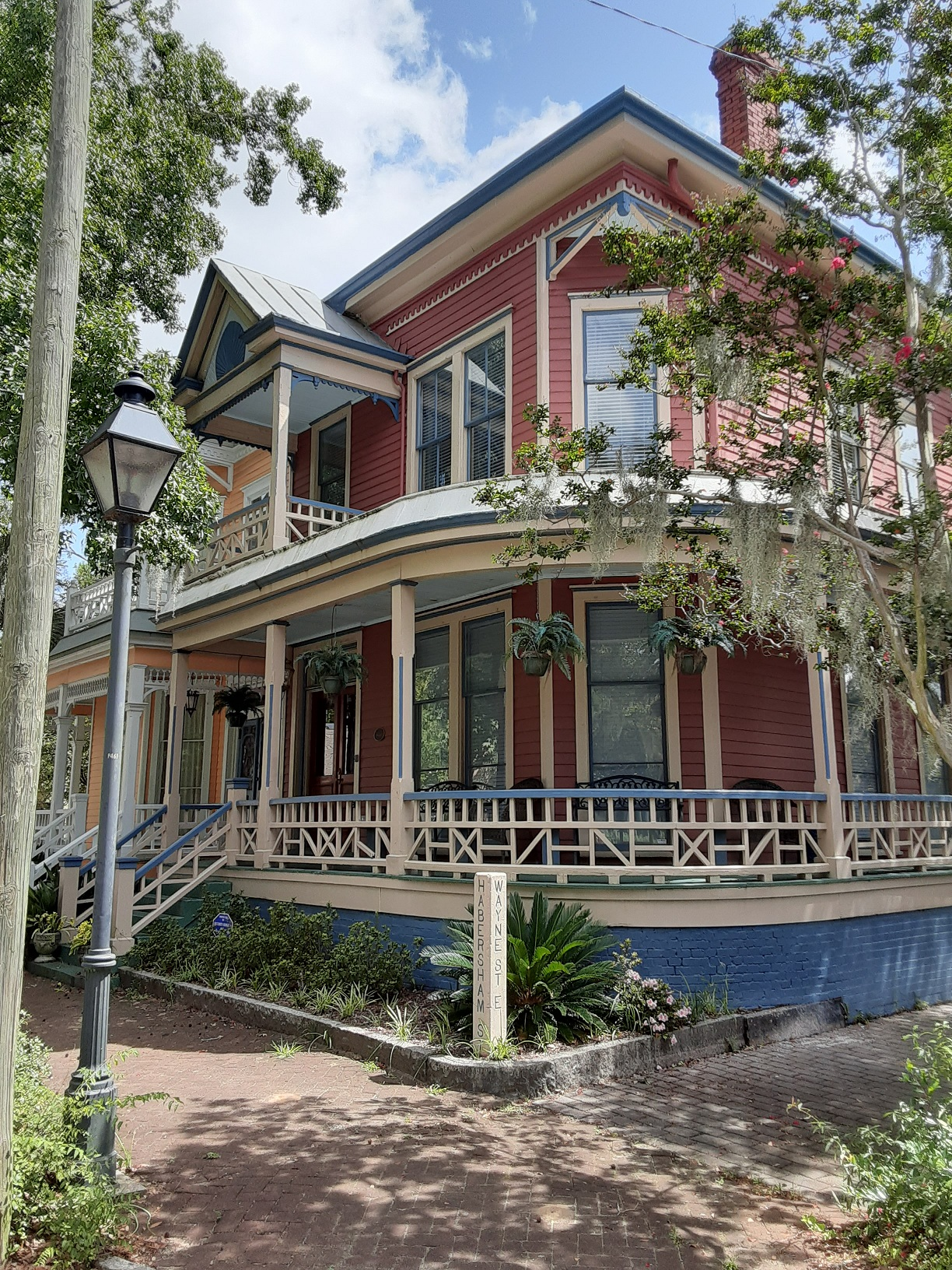
426 Habersham Street

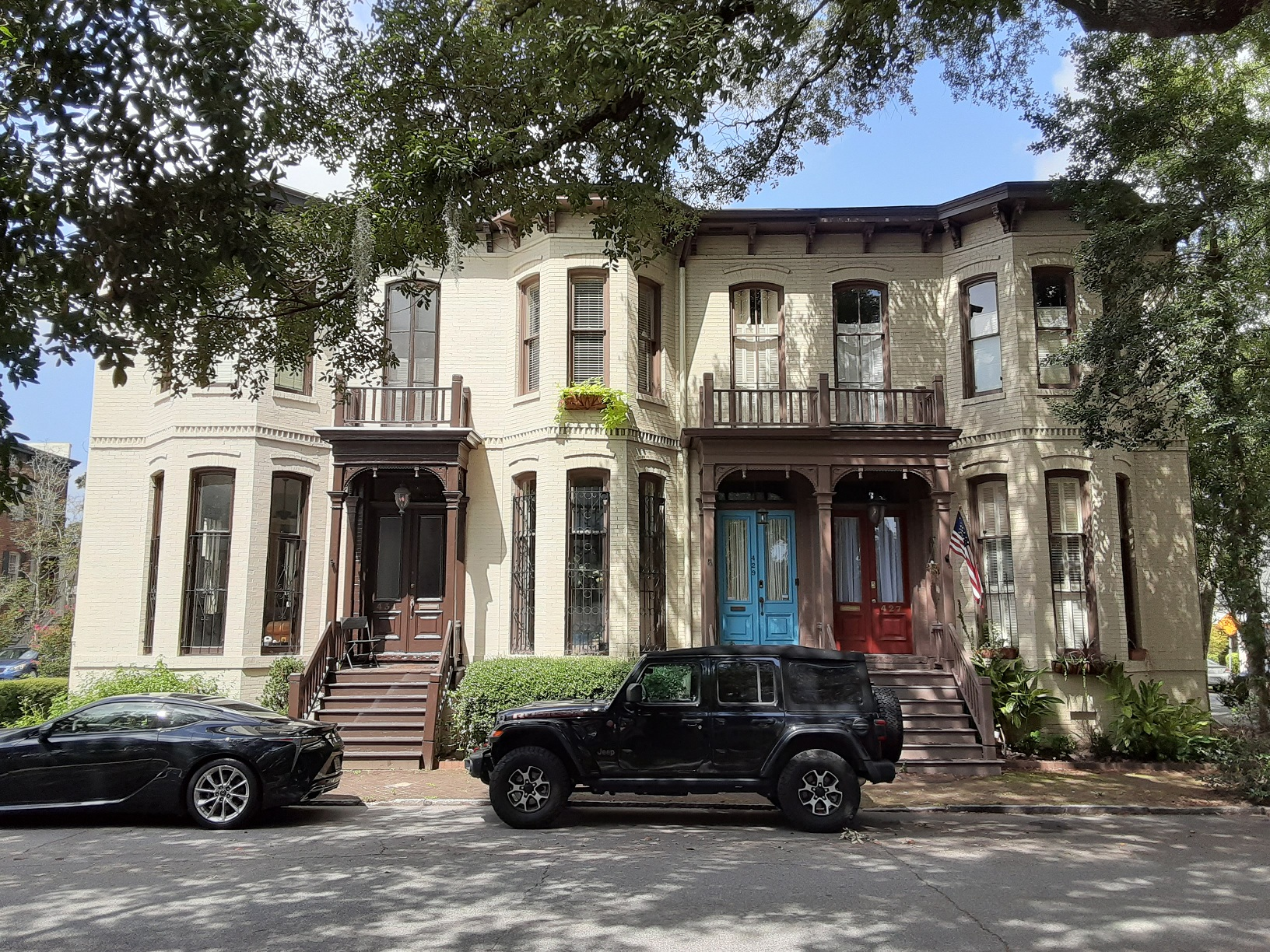
Mary Dwyer Property, 427–431 Habersham Street

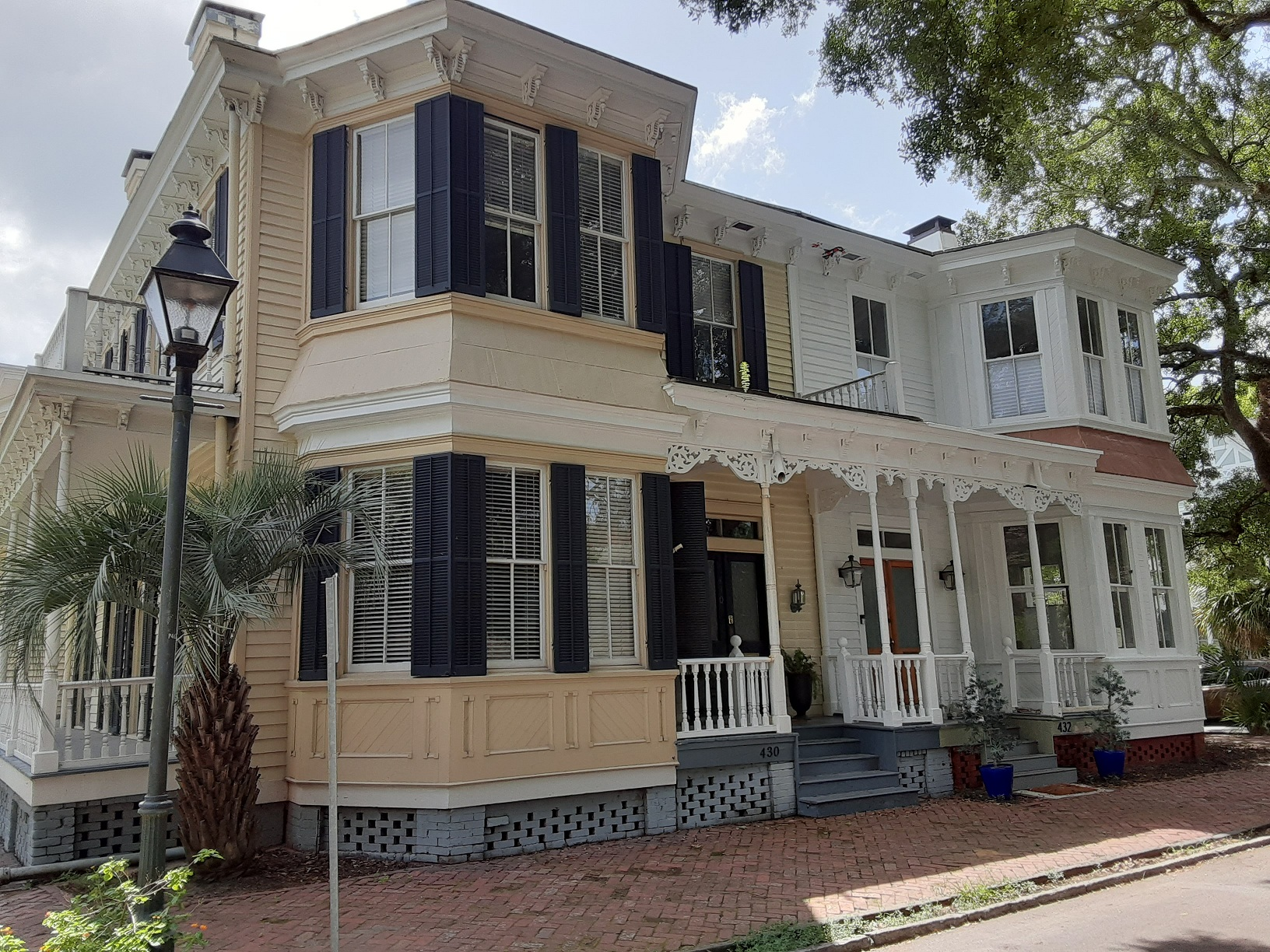
430–432 Habersham Street

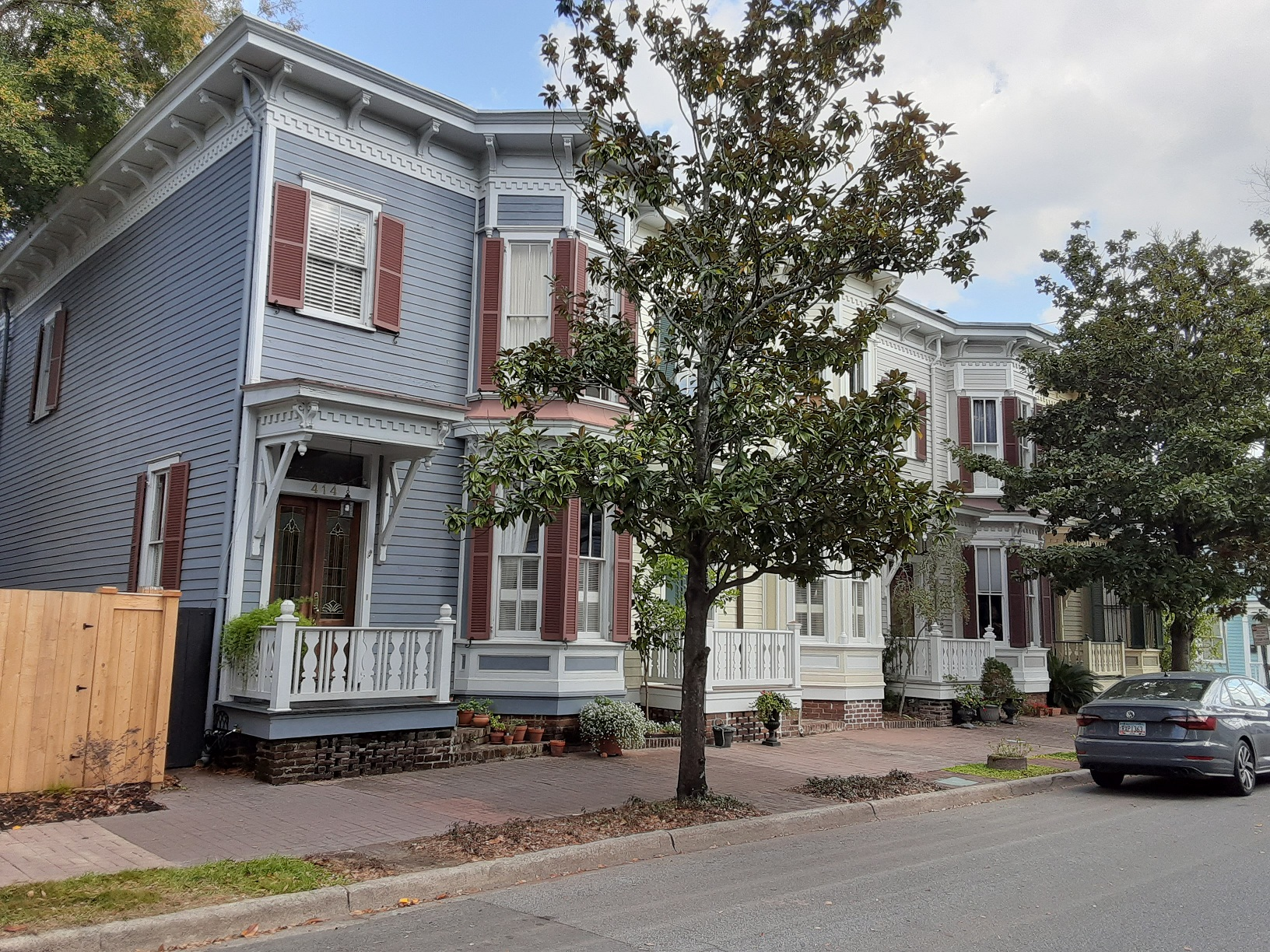
Abraham Samuels Row House, 414–420 Habersham Street

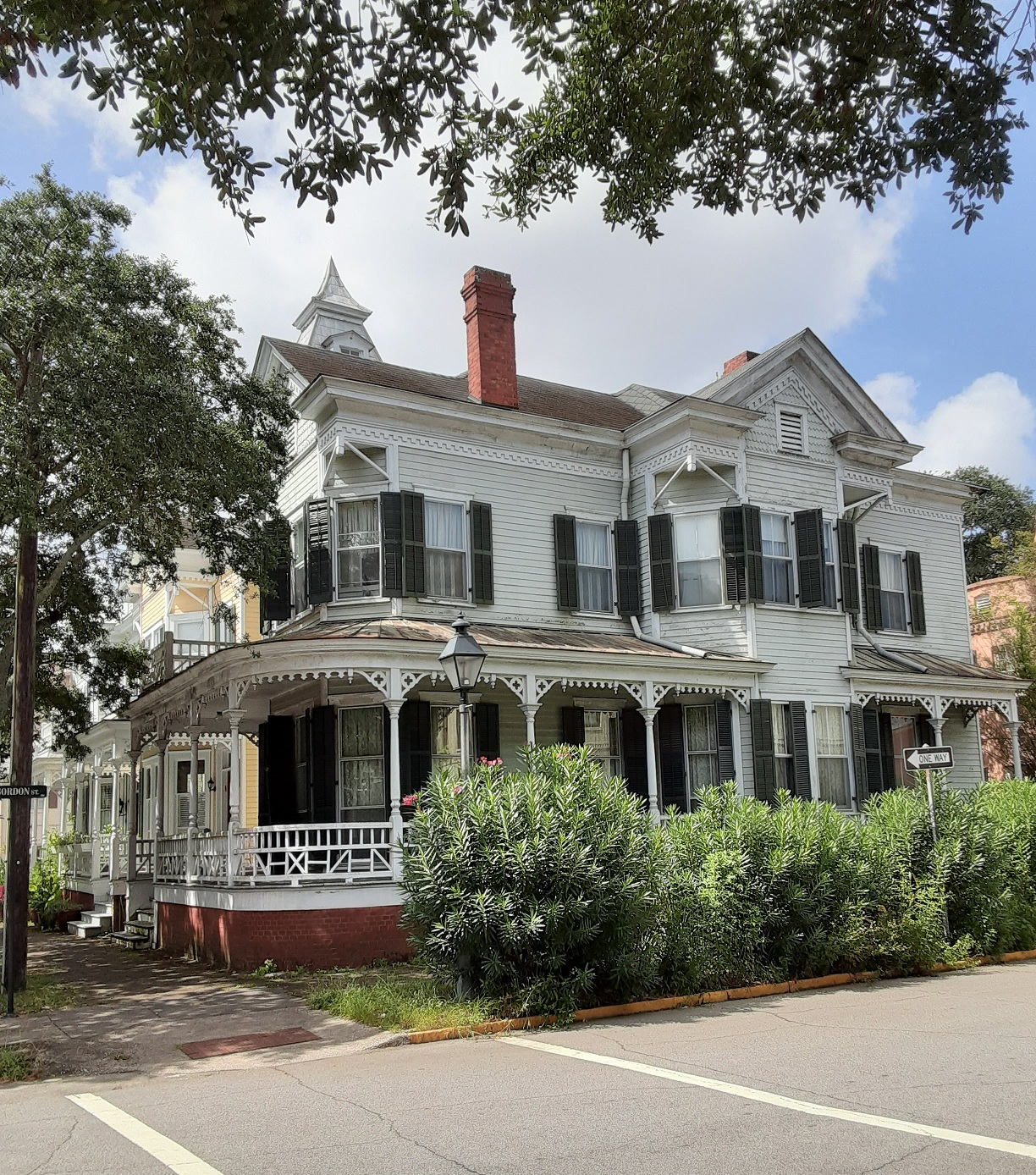
John Entelman Property (1), 433 Habersham Street

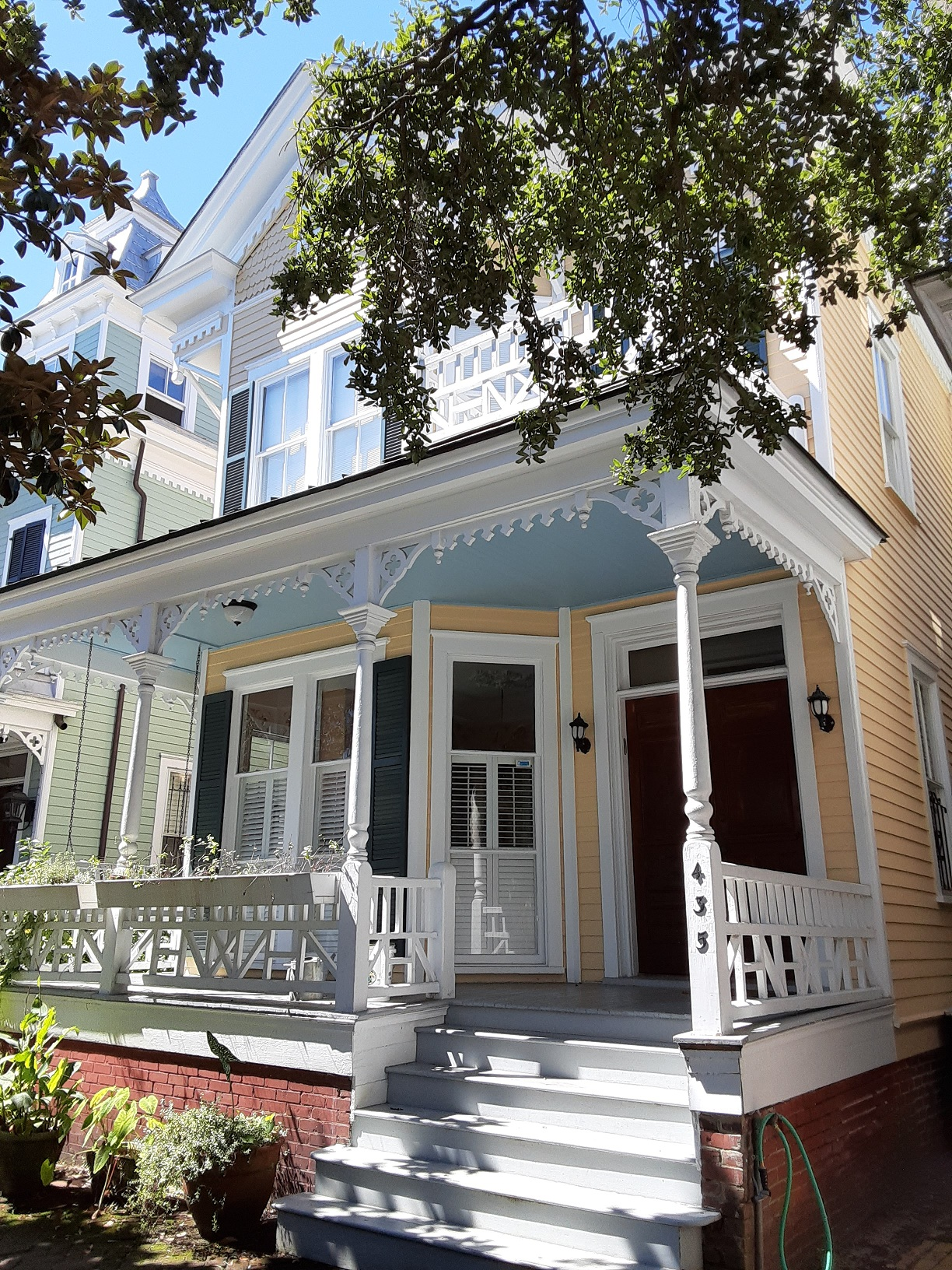
435 Habersham Street

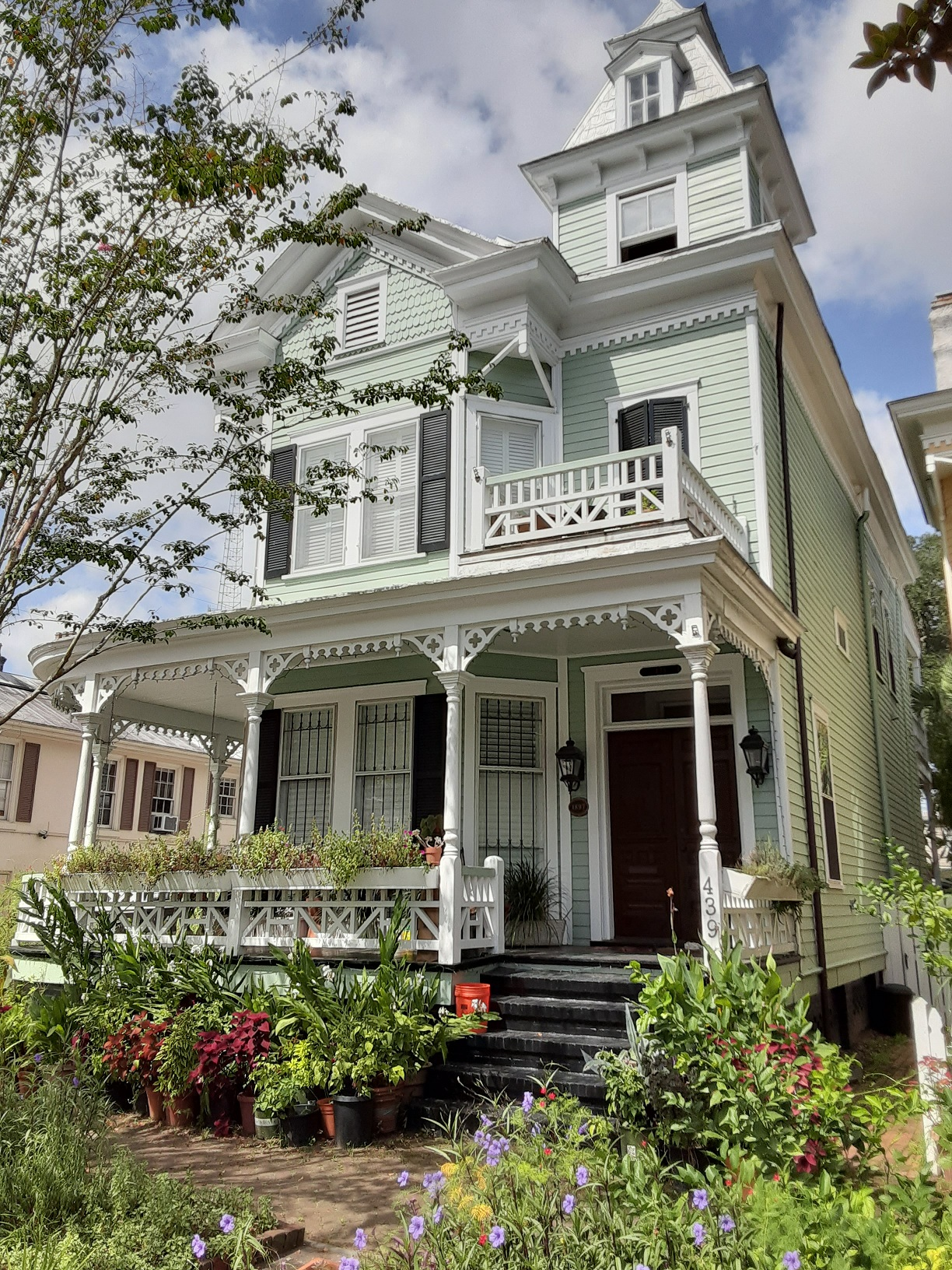
John Entelman Property (2), 437 Habersham Street

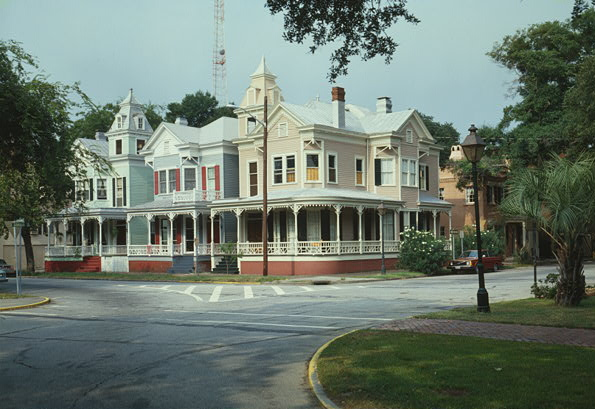
433–437 Habersham Street, 1979

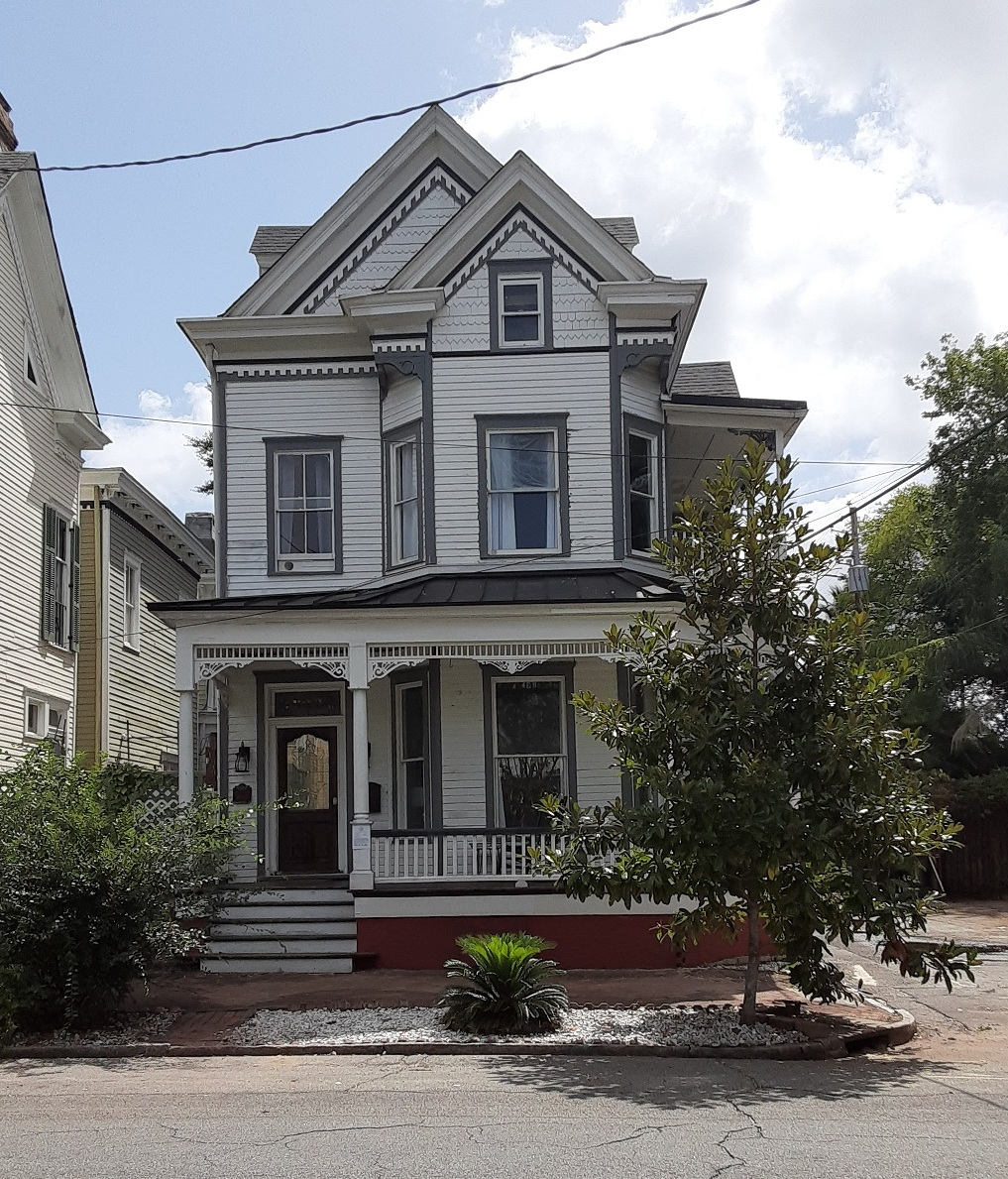
Sarah Sexton Property (3), 440 Habersham Street
