= First Congregational Church of Savannah =

- First Congregational Church, United Church of Christ
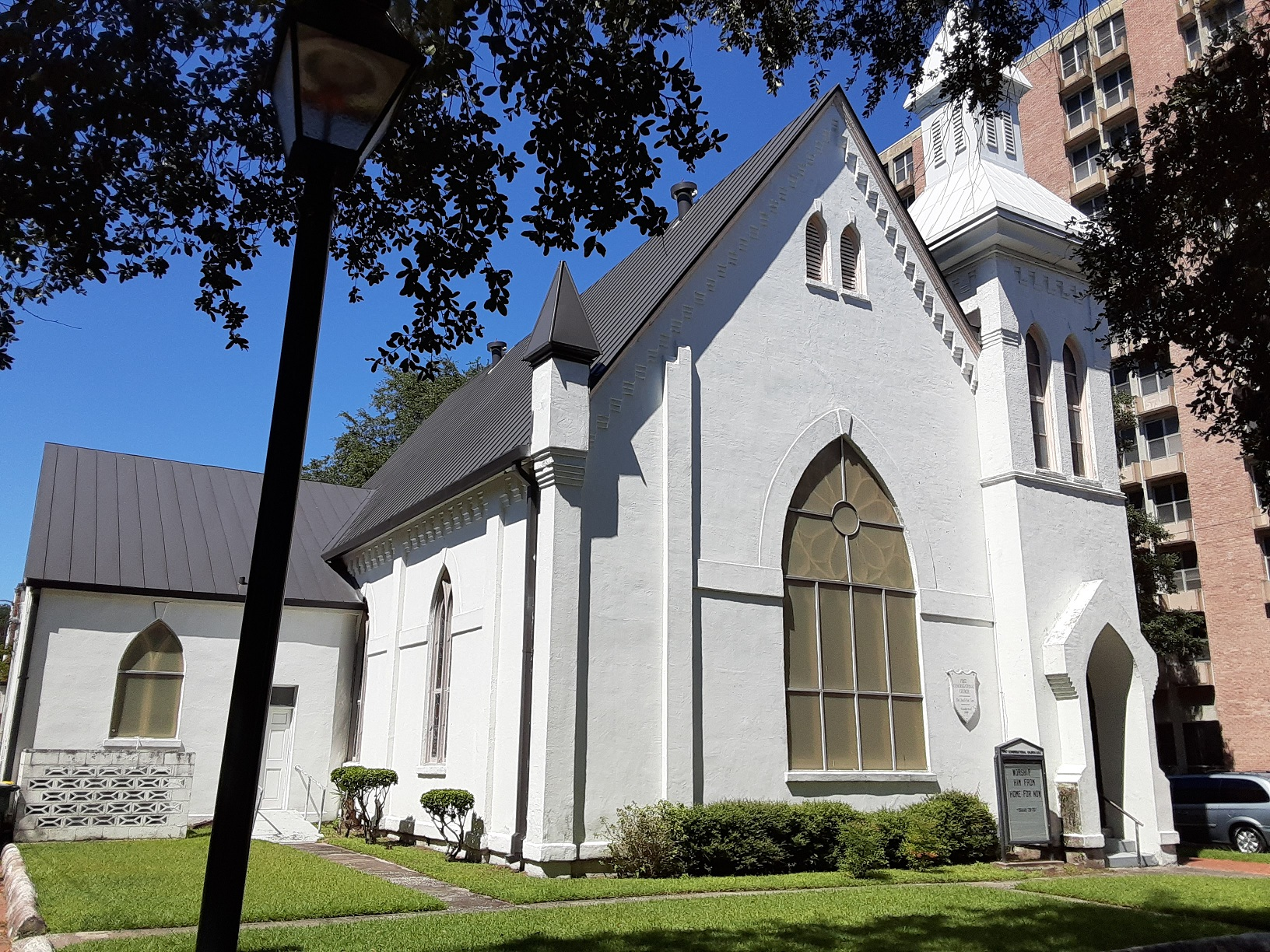
- The church in 2021
- First Congregational Church of Savannah
- 32.070545°N 81.090880°W
- Location: 421 Habersham Street; Whitefield Square; Savannah, Georgia
- Country: United States
- Denomination: Congregationalist; United Church of Christ
- Website: Official website

History
- Former name: Beach Institute
- Status: open

Architecture
- Functional status: used
- Architectural type: Gothic
- Completed: 1895; 131 years ago

The First Congregational Church is a church located at 421 Habersham Street in Savannah, Georgia, United States. It stands on the western side of Whitefield Square.

The church is unique to Savannah in that it was born out of an educational institution. What was known as the Oglethorpe Colored Free School (established in 1865 and named for the city's founder, James Oglethorpe) became the Beach Institute. The institute fell under the auspices of the Colored Educational Association of Savannah, itself an offspring of the American Missionary Society of New York.

The original Beach Institute building, erected in 1867 as its first school, still stands at 502 East Harris Street (now the Beach Institute African American Cultural Center). The Institute is named for Alfred Ely Beach — son of Moses Yale Beach and a descendant of Plymouth pilgrim William Brewster and Elihu Yale — who donated the land.

In April 1869, thirteen men and women, along with the Rev. Robert L. Carter, founded the First Congregational Church of Savannah. Meetings were held at the Beach Institute, amongst other venues, over the next few years. In 1878, it acquired the lot at Taylor and Habersham Streets The first small-frame meeting house was replaced in 1895 with the present Gothic structure, which was renovated in 1968. The building's original steeple was destroyed in a 1940 storm, and it was not replaced until 1992.

The Madeline V. Hanne Fellowship Hall was added onto the church, on land that was donated by the St Joseph's Hospital, in 1976.

The church's first members were white missionaries and students of the school. Its first four ministers were New Englanders.

== See also ==
- Solomon C. Johnson, church clerk and member for sixty years
