= State Street (Savannah, Georgia) =

Prominent street in Savannah, Georgia

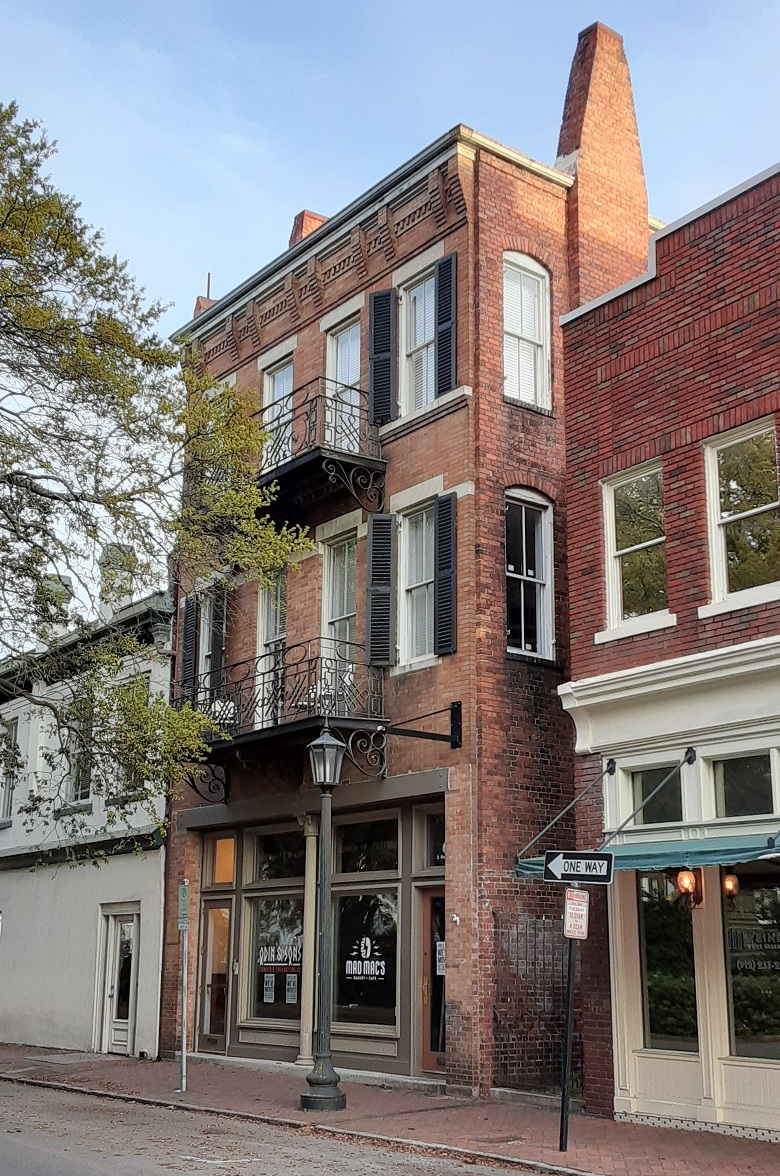
- 6 East State Street in Wright Square
- Former name: Prince Street
- Length: 0.70 mi (1.13 km)
- Location: Savannah, Georgia, U.S.
- West end: Montgomery Street
- East end: East Broad Street

State Street is a prominent street in Savannah, Georgia, United States. Located between Broughton Street to the north and York Street to the south, it runs for about 0.70 miles (1.13 km) from Montgomery Street in the west to East Broad Street in the east.

The street is entirely within Savannah Historic District, a National Historic Landmark District.

State Street passes through five squares on their northern side. From west to east:

- Telfair Square
- Wright Square
- Oglethorpe Square
- Columbia Square
- Greene Square

== Notable buildings and structures ==
Below is a selection of notable buildings and structures on State Street, all in Savannah's Historic District. From west to east:

West State Street

- John Tietgen Building, 306 West State Street (1908)
- 18 West State Street (1916)
- Isaac Morrell Building, 16 West State Street (1853)
- Edward Lovell Property, 14 West State Street (1853)
- William Waring Property, 12 West State Street (1825)

East State Street

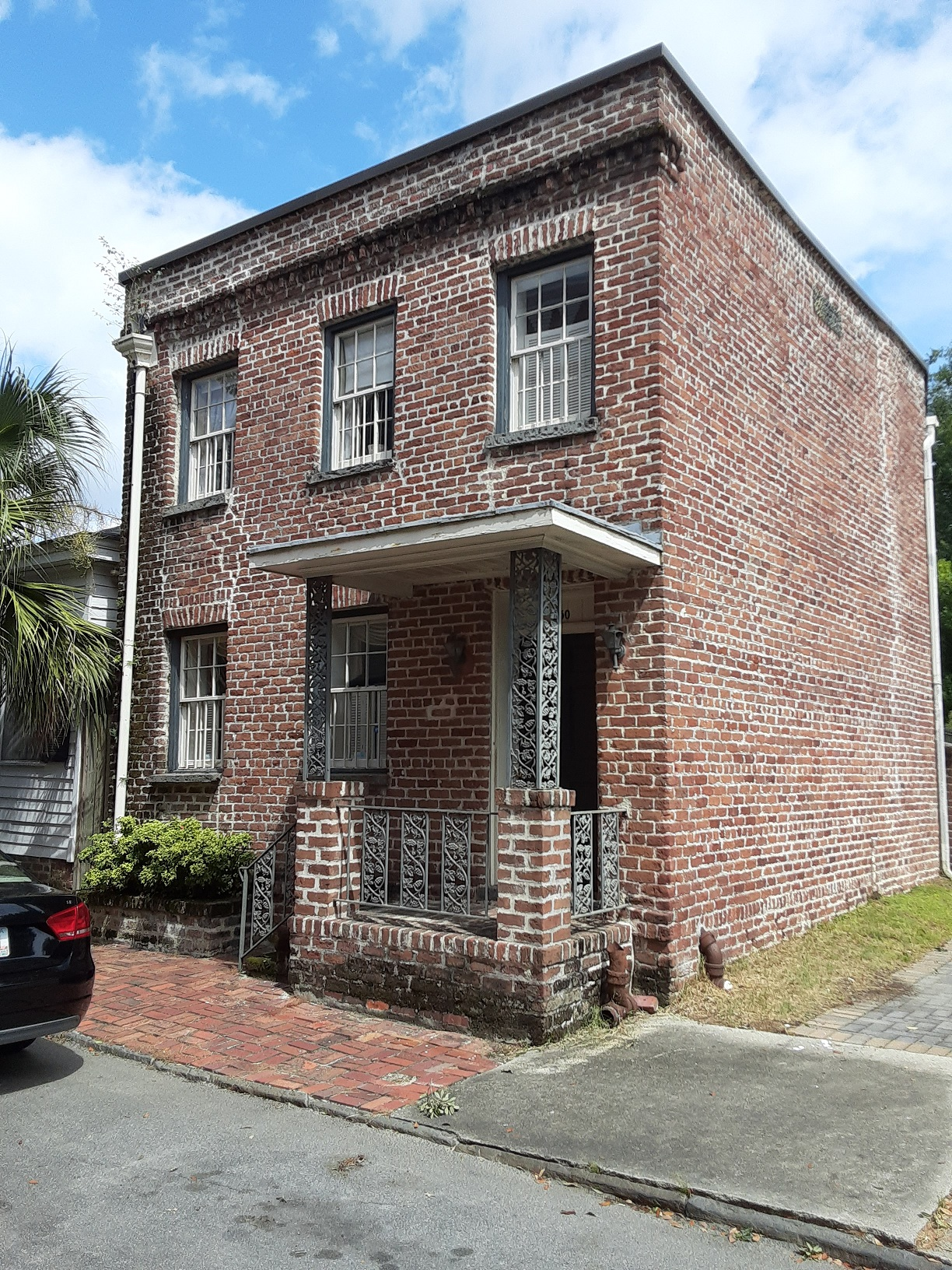
Joseph Burke House, 550 East State Street (1854)

- 6 East State Street (by 1900)
- 8 East State Street (1929)
- A. D. Hevirance Building, 14 East State Street (1908)
- 18 East State Street (1905)
- Patrick Duffy Building, 24 East State Street (1855) – home to Bradley Lock and Key
- Lutheran Church of the Ascension, 120 Bull Street (21 East State Street) (1878)
- Graham Apartment Building, 210 East State Street (1924)
- 216 East State Street (1912)
- Michael Lyons Property, 220–224 East State Street (1893)
- Edward Moran Duplex, 302–308 East State Street (1856)
- Isaiah Davenport House, 324 East State Street (1820; on the National Register of Historic Places)
- Francis M. Stone House, 402 East State Street (1821)
- "Laura's Cottage", 416 East State Street (circa 1805; moved from Greene Ward)
- Timothy Bonticou Double House, 418–420 East State Street (1854–1861; moved from East Broughton Lane in 1972)
- Henry Willink Duplex, 422–424 East State Street (circa 1850)
- 532–534 East State Street (1897)
- John Dorsett House, 536 East State Street (1845) – moved from 422 Hull Street to Greene Square in the mid-20th century
- 538 East State Street (1818)
- 542 East State Street (1818)
- Joseph Burke House, 550 East State Street (1854)

6 East State Street, in Wright Square, appeared in the 1997 movie Midnight in the Garden of Good and Evil as Dixie's Flowers, the store at which Mandy (Alison Eastwood) worked.

204 East State Street, the Elliott–Huger House, stood between 1826 and 1932. It was built for U.S. senator John Elliott by Isaiah Davenport.
