= Wright Square (Savannah, Georgia) =

Public square in Savannah, Georgia

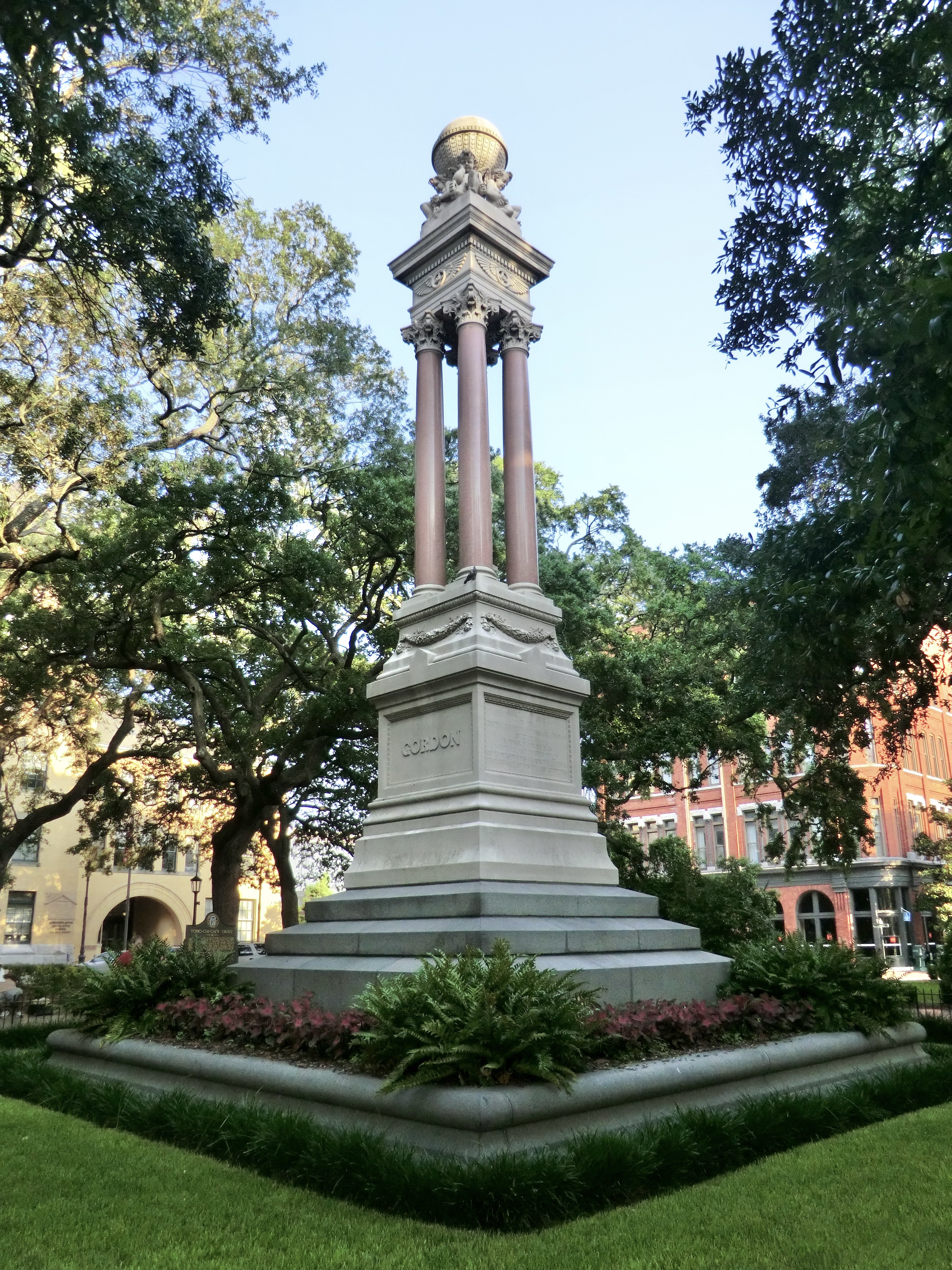
- William Washington Gordon Monument in the square
- Interactive map of Wright Square
- Former names: Percival Square; Court House Square; Post Office Square
- Namesake: James Wright
- Maintained by: City of Savannah
- Location: Savannah, Georgia, U.S.
- Coordinates: 32.0779°N 81.0923°W
- North: Bull Street
- East: East President Street
- South: Bull Street
- West: West President Street

Construction
- Completion: 1733 (293 years ago)

Wright Square is one of the 22 squares of Savannah, Georgia, United States. It is located in the second row of the city's five rows of squares, on Bull Street and President Street, and was laid out in 1733 as one of the first four squares. It is south of Johnson Square, west of Oglethorpe Square, north of Chippewa Square and east of Telfair Square. The oldest building on the square is the William Waring Property, at 12 West State Street, which dates to 1825.

The second square established in Savannah, it was originally named Percival Square, for John Percival, 1st Earl of Egmont, generally regarded as the man who gave the colony of Georgia its name (a tribute to Great Britain's King George II). It was renamed in 1763 to honor James Wright, the third and final royal governor of Georgia. Throughout its history it has also been known as Court House Square and Post Office Square; the present Tomochichi Federal Building and United States Court House is adjacent to the west.

The square is the burial site of Tomochichi, a leader of the Creek nation of Native Americans. Tomochichi was a trusted friend of General James Oglethorpe and assisted him in the founding of his colony. When Tomochichi died in 1739, Oglethorpe ordered him buried with military honors in the center of Percival Square. In accordance with his people's customs, the grave was marked by a pyramid of stones gathered from the surrounding area. In 1883, citizens wishing to honor William Washington Gordon replaced Tomochichi's monument with an elaborate and highly allegorical monument to Gordon, called the William Washington Gordon Monument. William Gordon is thus the only native Savannahian honored with a monument in one of the city's squares. Gordon's daughter-in-law, Nellie, objected strongly to this perceived insult to Tomochichi. She and other members of the Colonial Dames of the State of Georgia planned to erect a new monument to Tomochichi, made of granite from Stone Mountain. The Stone Mountain Monument Company offered the material at no cost. Mrs. Gordon felt that she was being condescended to and insisted on paying. The Monument Company sent her a bill—some sources say for 50 cents, others for one dollar—payable on Judgment Day. Mrs. Gordon paid the bill and attached a note explaining that on Judgment Day the Dames "would be too busy attending their own duties on that momentous day." The new monument was erected in 1899. It stands in the southeast corner of the square and eulogizes Tomochichi as a great friend of James Oglethorpe and the people of Georgia.

6 East State Street, in the northeastern tything lot of the square, doubled as Dixie's Flowers, the flower shop Mandy (Alison Eastwood) works at in Midnight in the Garden of Good and Evil.

Bradley Lock and Key, located in the Patrick Duffy Building at 24 East State Street, also in the northeastern tything lot, is the oldest operating business in Savannah.

== Dedication ==
Namesake	Image	Note
James Wright		The square is named for James Wright (1716–1785), the last royal governor of the Province of Georgia.

== Markers and structures ==
Object	Image	Note
Gordon Monument		Another view of the monument
Tomochichi Monument		Plaque on Tomochichi's monument

== Constituent buildings ==
Each building below is in one of the eight blocks around the square composed of four residential "tything" blocks and four civic ("trust") blocks, now known as the Oglethorpe Plan. They are listed with construction years where known.

Northwestern residential/tything block

- 111–119 Bull Street (1907)
- William Waring Property, 12 West State Street (1824–1825) – oldest building on the square
- Edward Lovell Property, 14 West State Street (1853)
- Isaac Morrell Building, 16 West State Street (1853)
- 18 West State Street (1916)

Western civic/trust block

- Tomochichi Federal Building and United States Court House, 125 Bull Street (1895)

Southwestern residential/tything block

- 135–139 Bull Street (1875)
- Lindsay & Morgan Building, 5–11 West York Street (1921)
- Thomas Henderson Building, 15–21 West York Street (1890)

Northeastern residential/tything block

- 6 East State Street (by 1900)
- 8 East State Street (1929)
- 14 East State Street (1908)
- 18 East State Street (1905)
- Patrick Duffy Building, 24 East State Street (1885) – presently the home of Bradley Lock and Key
- A. R. Altmeyer Building, 110–118 Bull Street (1892)

Northeastern civic/trust block

- Lutheran Church of the Ascension, 120 Bull Street (1878)

Southeastern civic/trust block

- Old Chatham County Court House, 124 Bull Street (1889)

Southeastern residential/tything block

- Peter Ott Property, 15–19 East York Street (1892)
- John Schwarz Building, 136–140 Bull Street (1890)

== Gallery ==
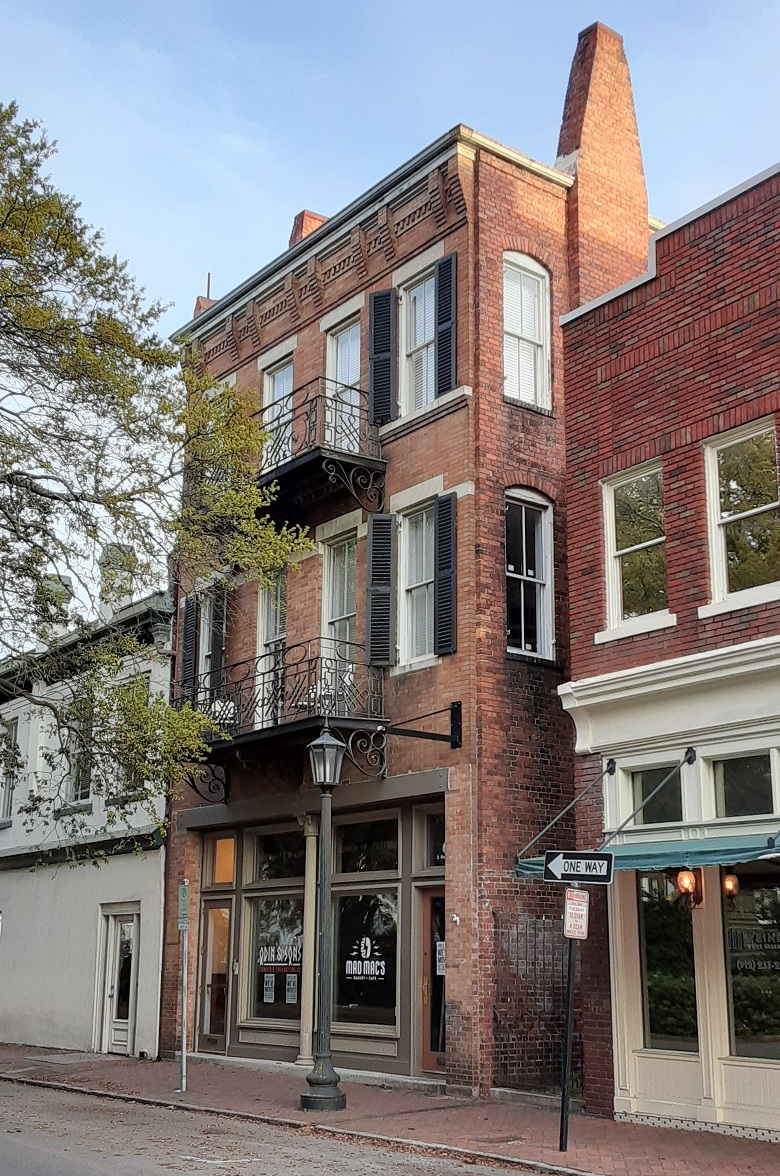
6 East State Street

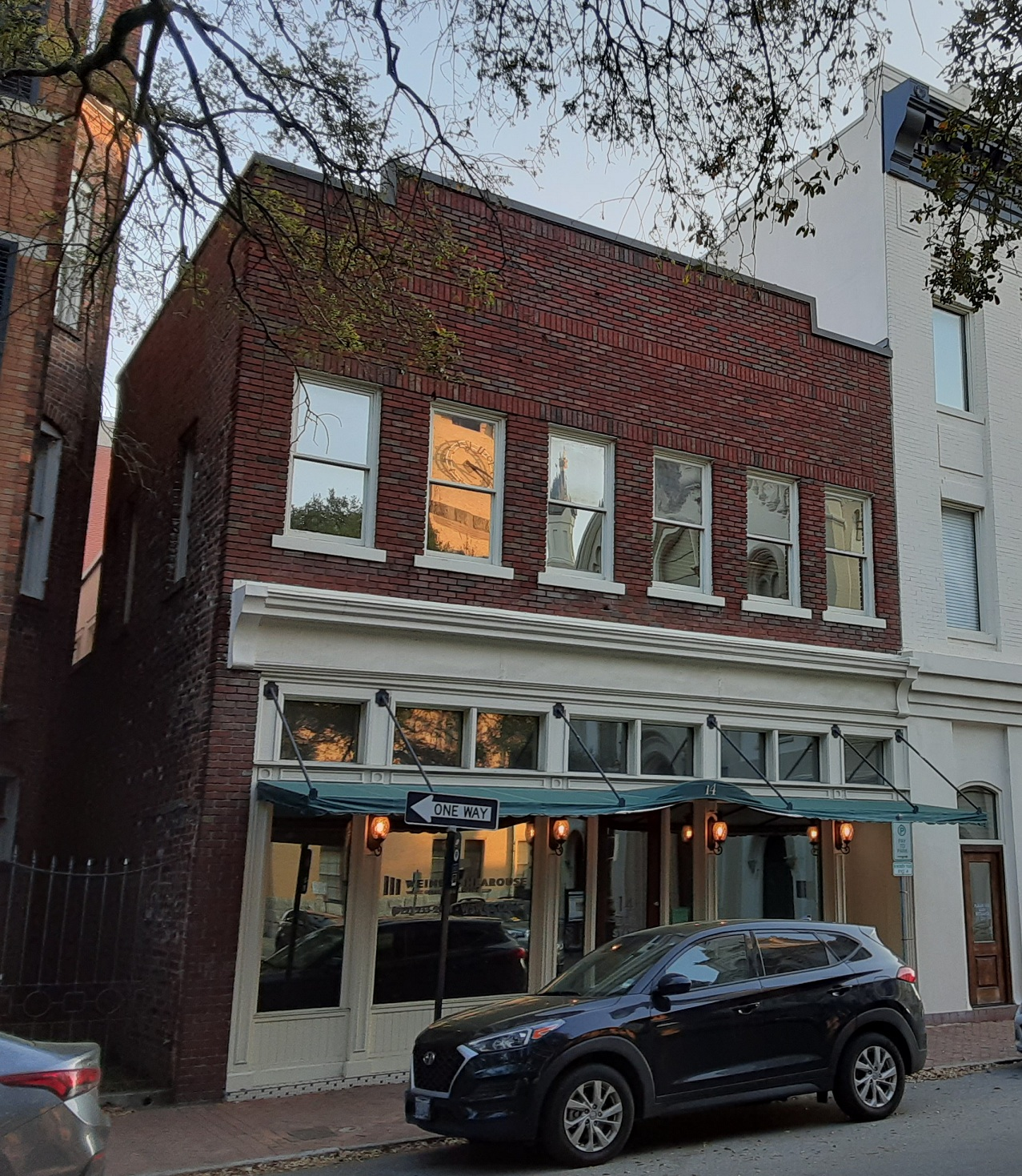
8 East State Street

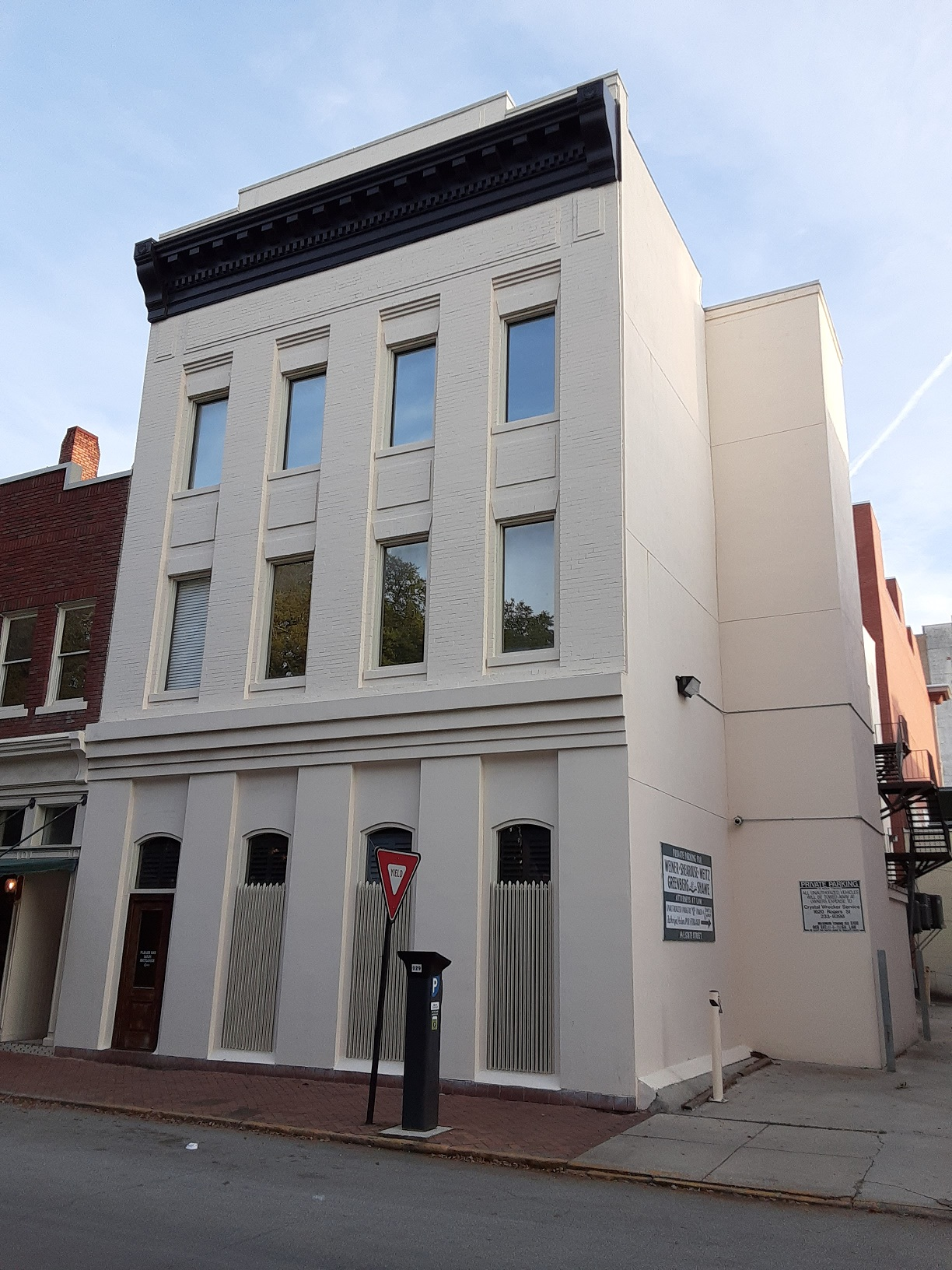
14 East State Street

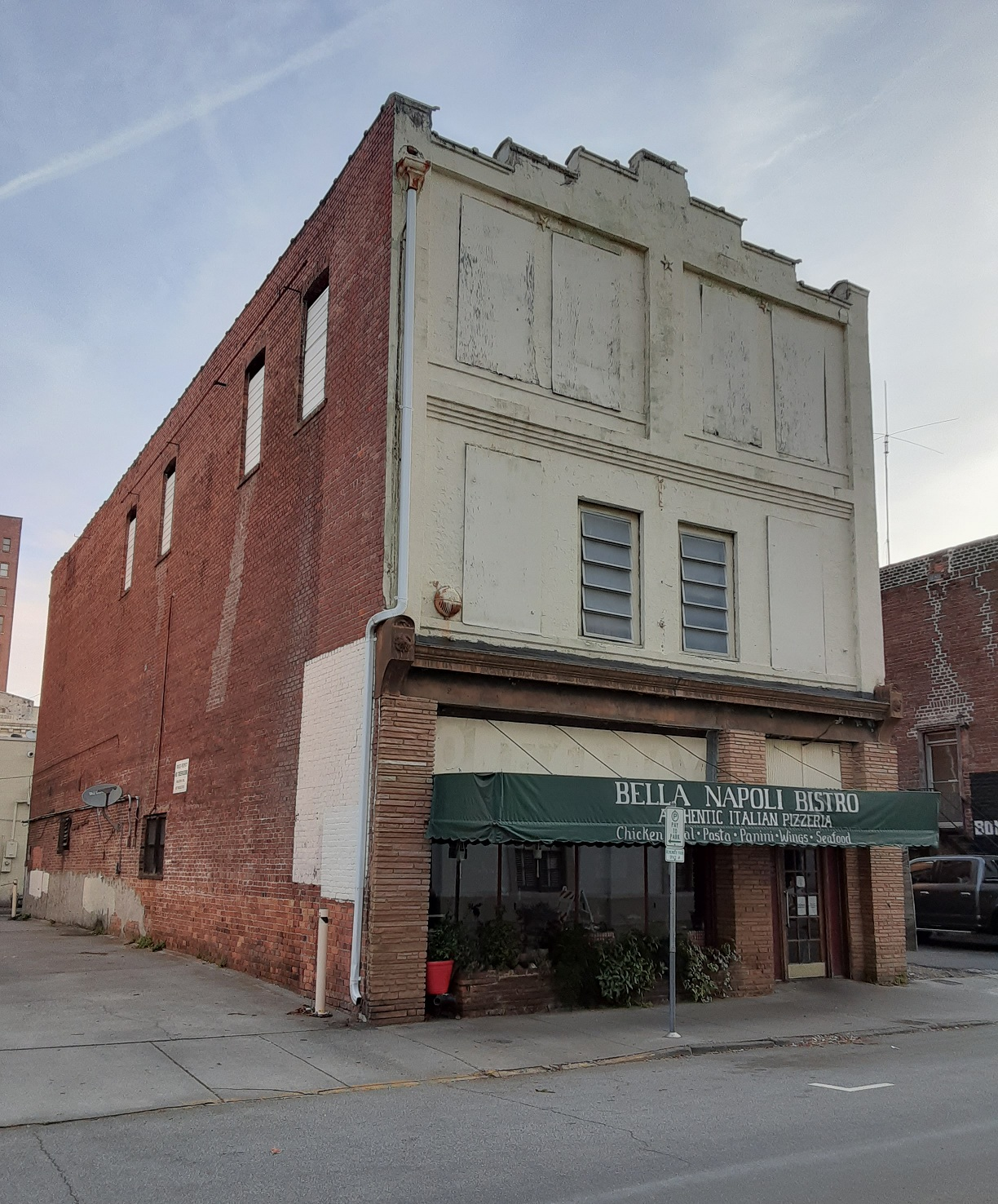
18 East State Street

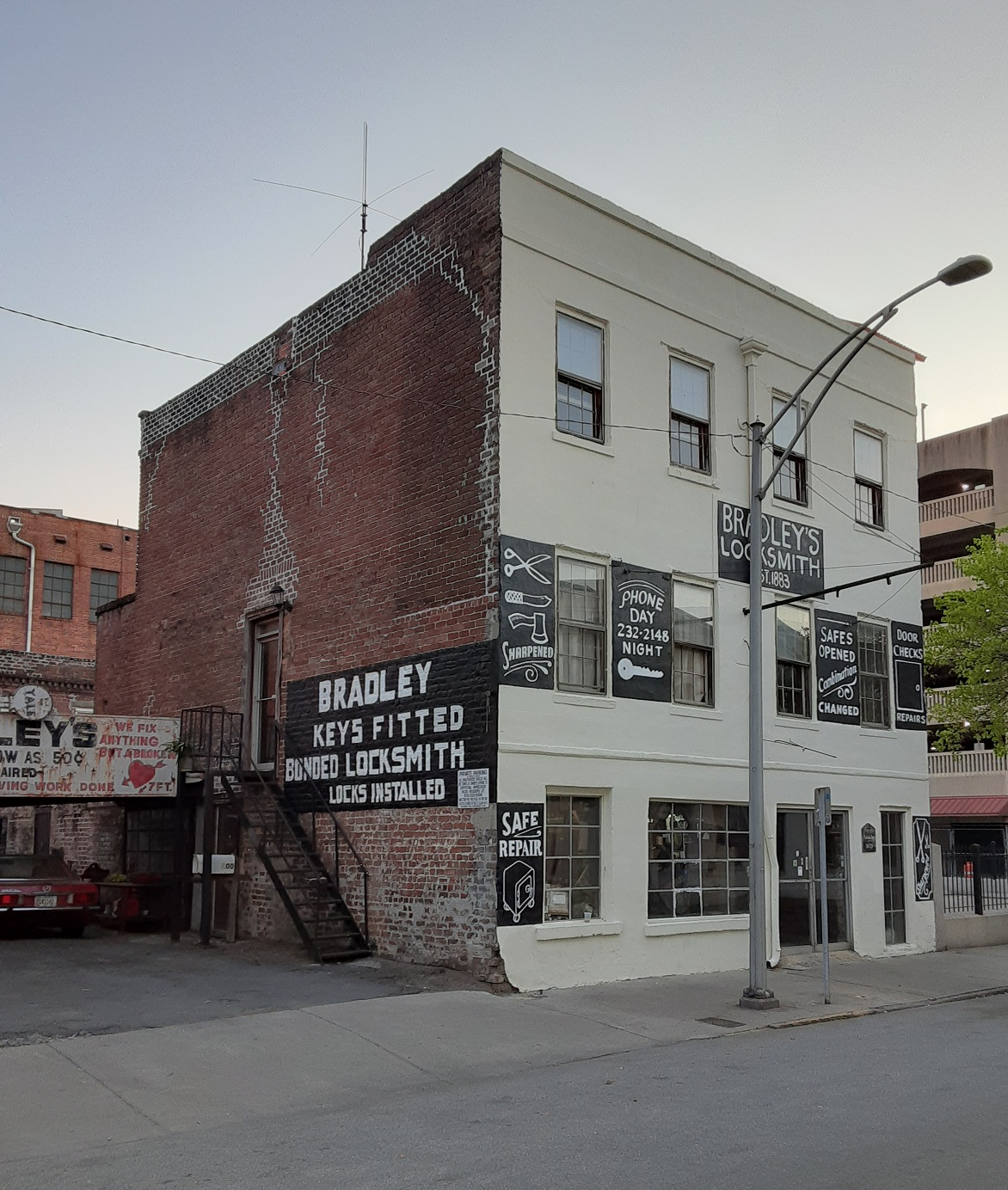
Patrick Duffy Building, 24 East State Street

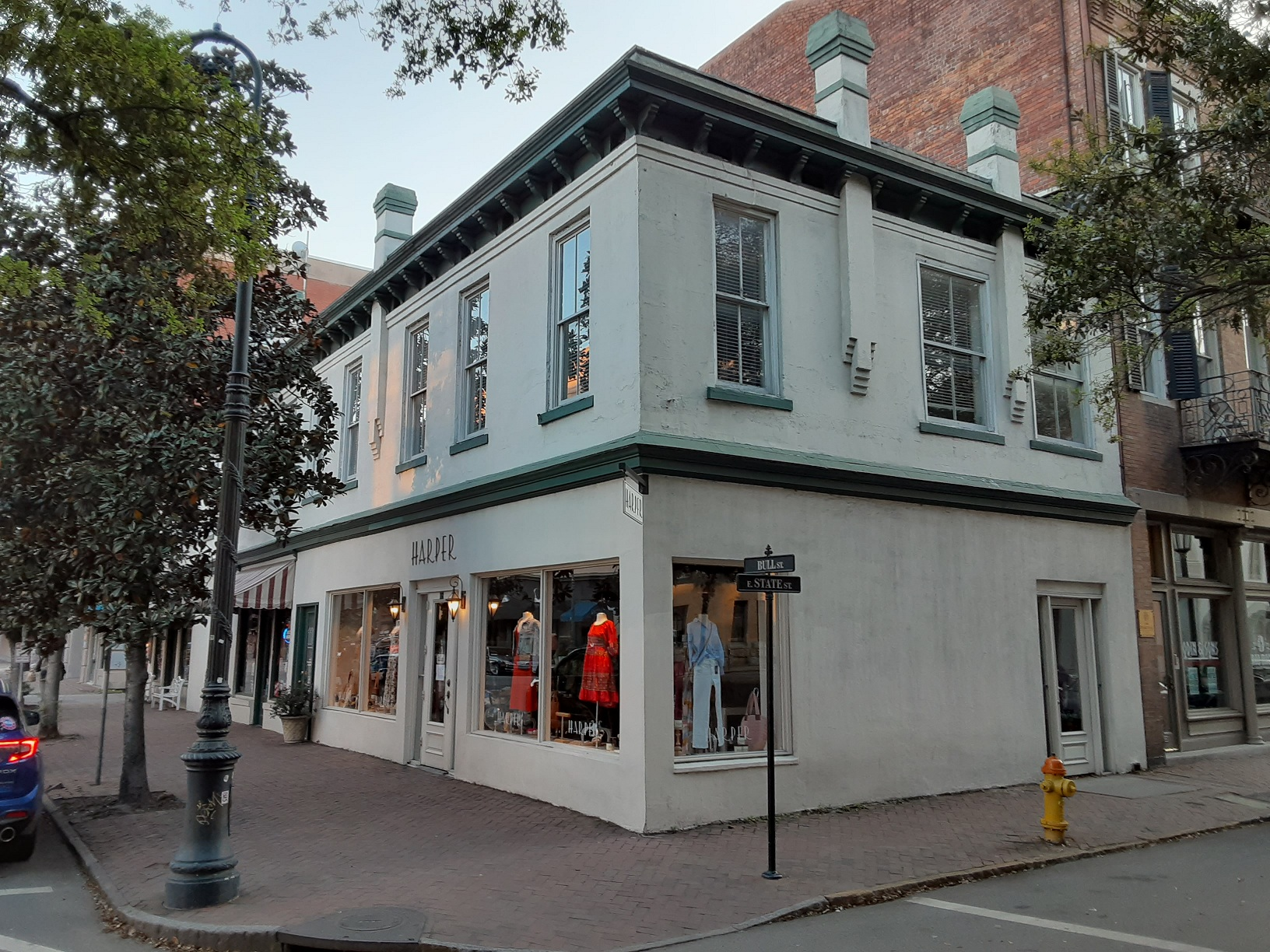
A. R. Altmeyer Building, 110–118 Bull Street

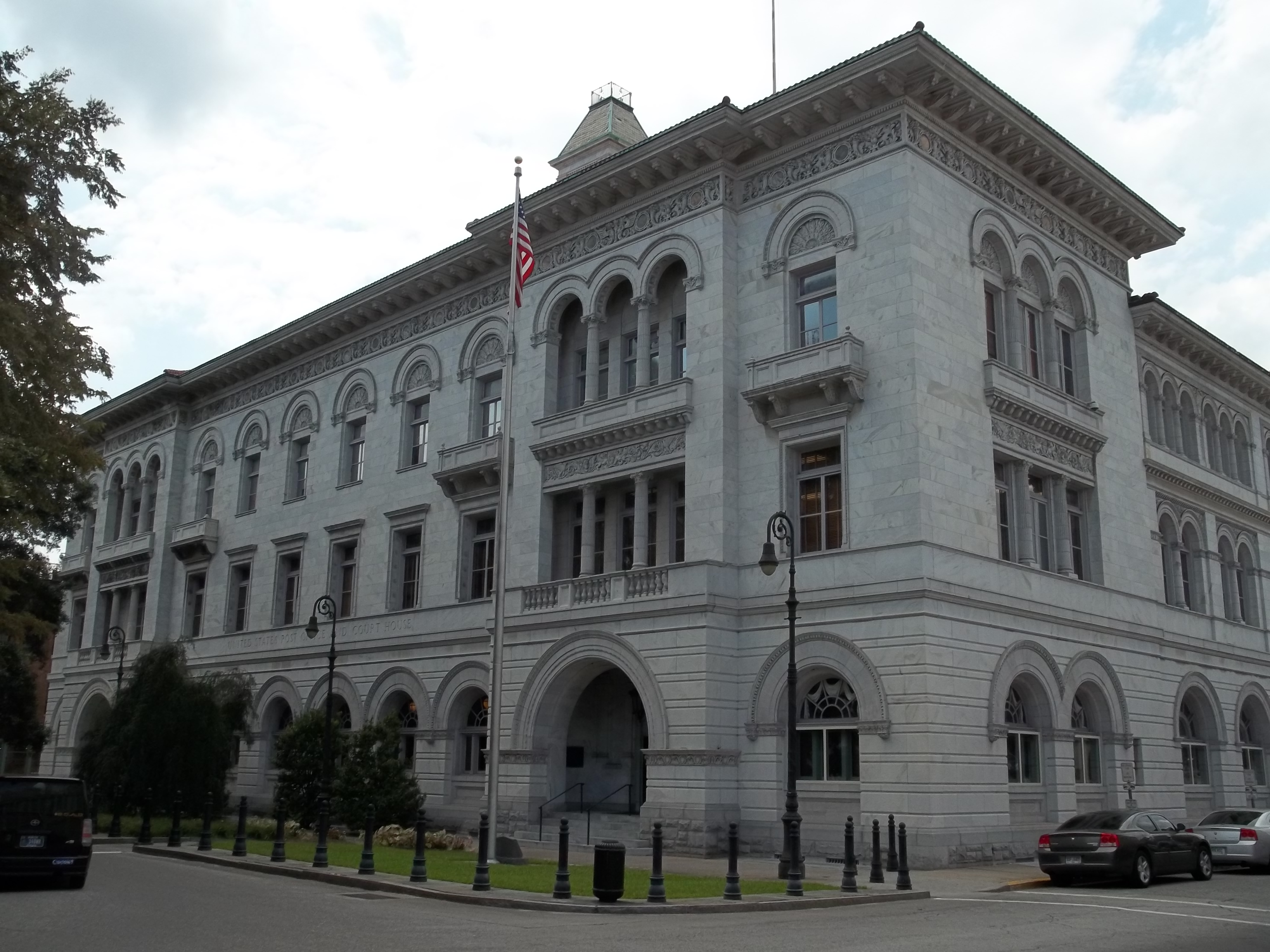
Tomochichi Federal Building and United States Court House, 125 Bull Street

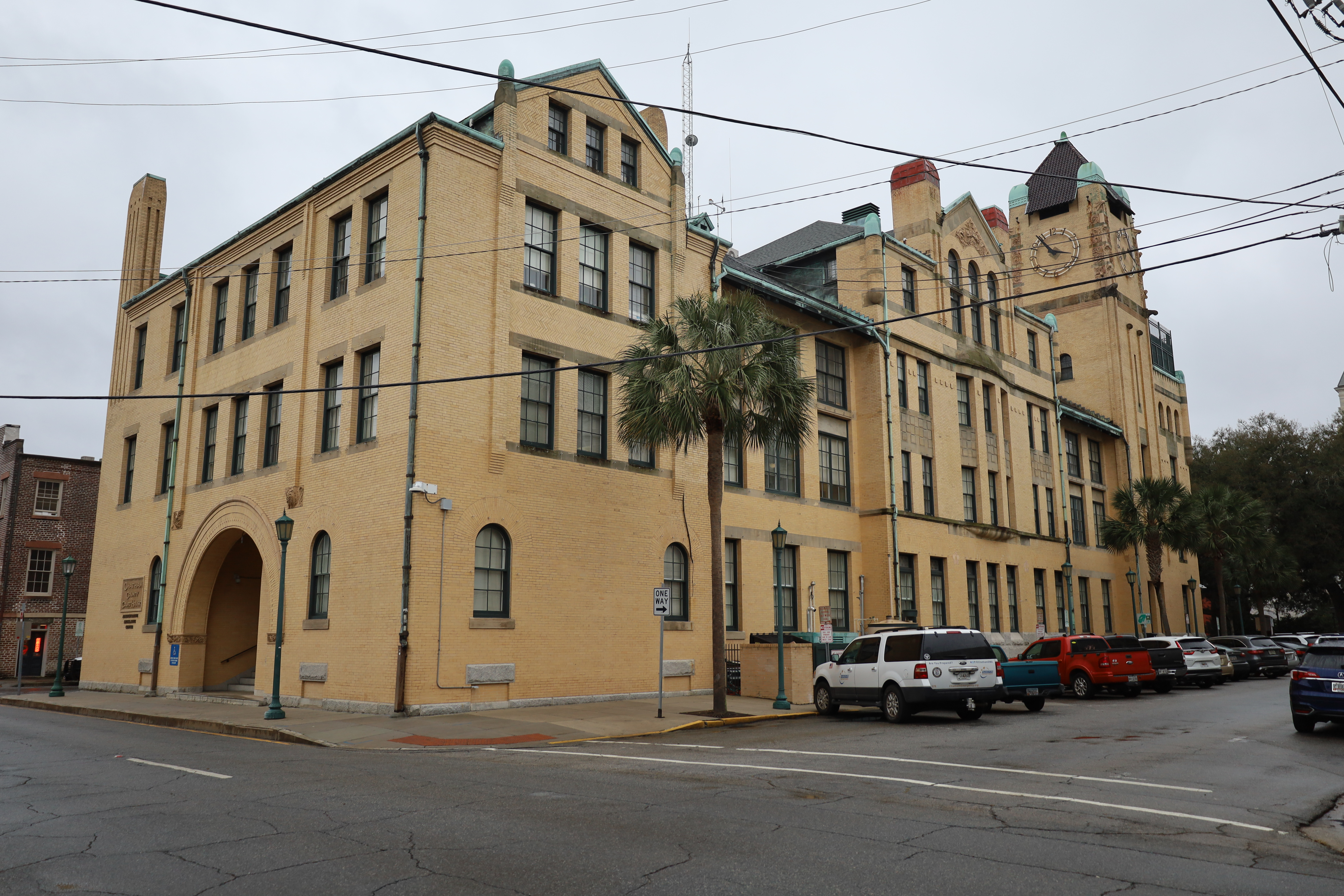
Old Chatham County Court House, 124 Bull Street

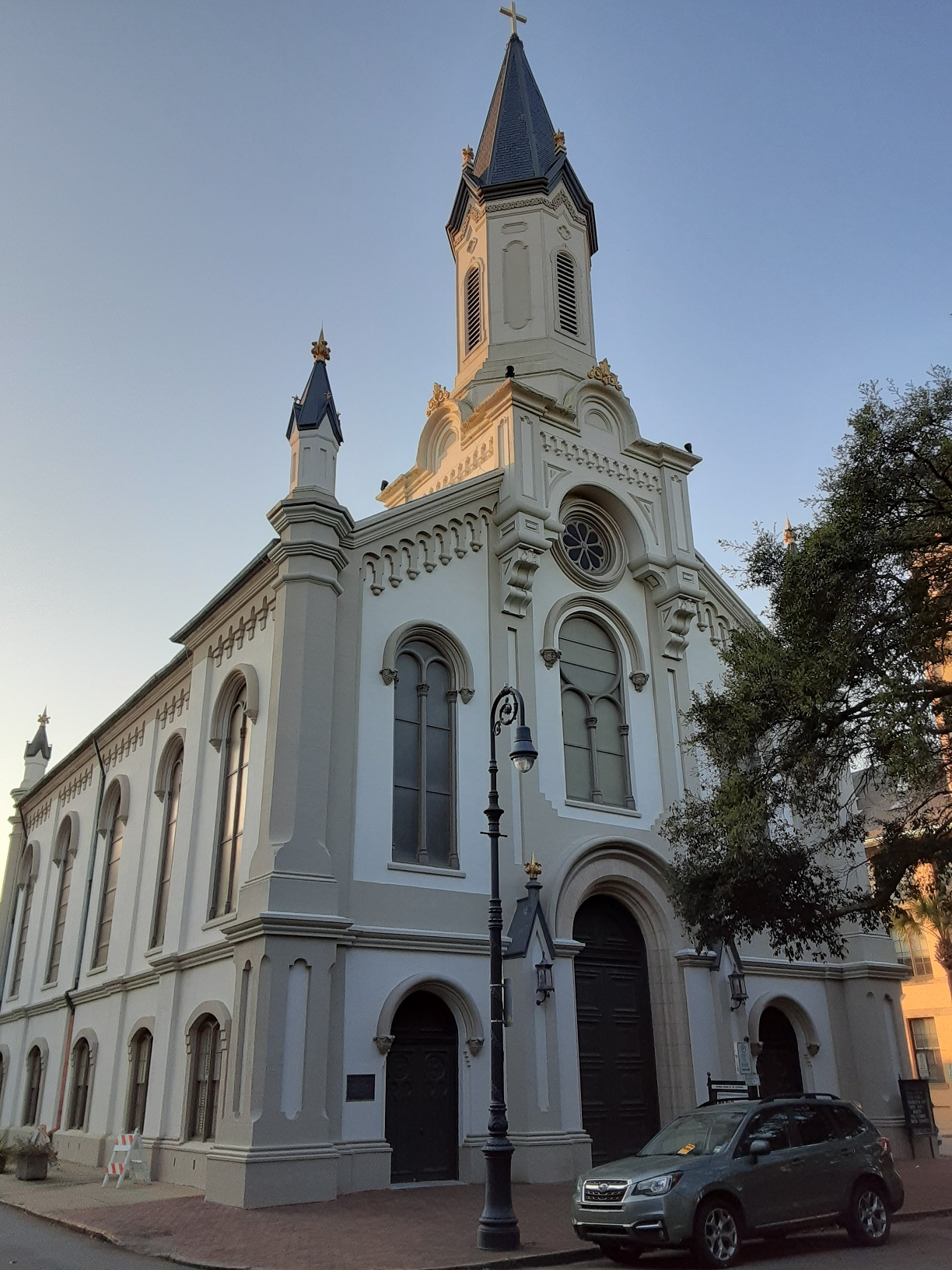
Lutheran Church of the Ascension, 120 Bull Street

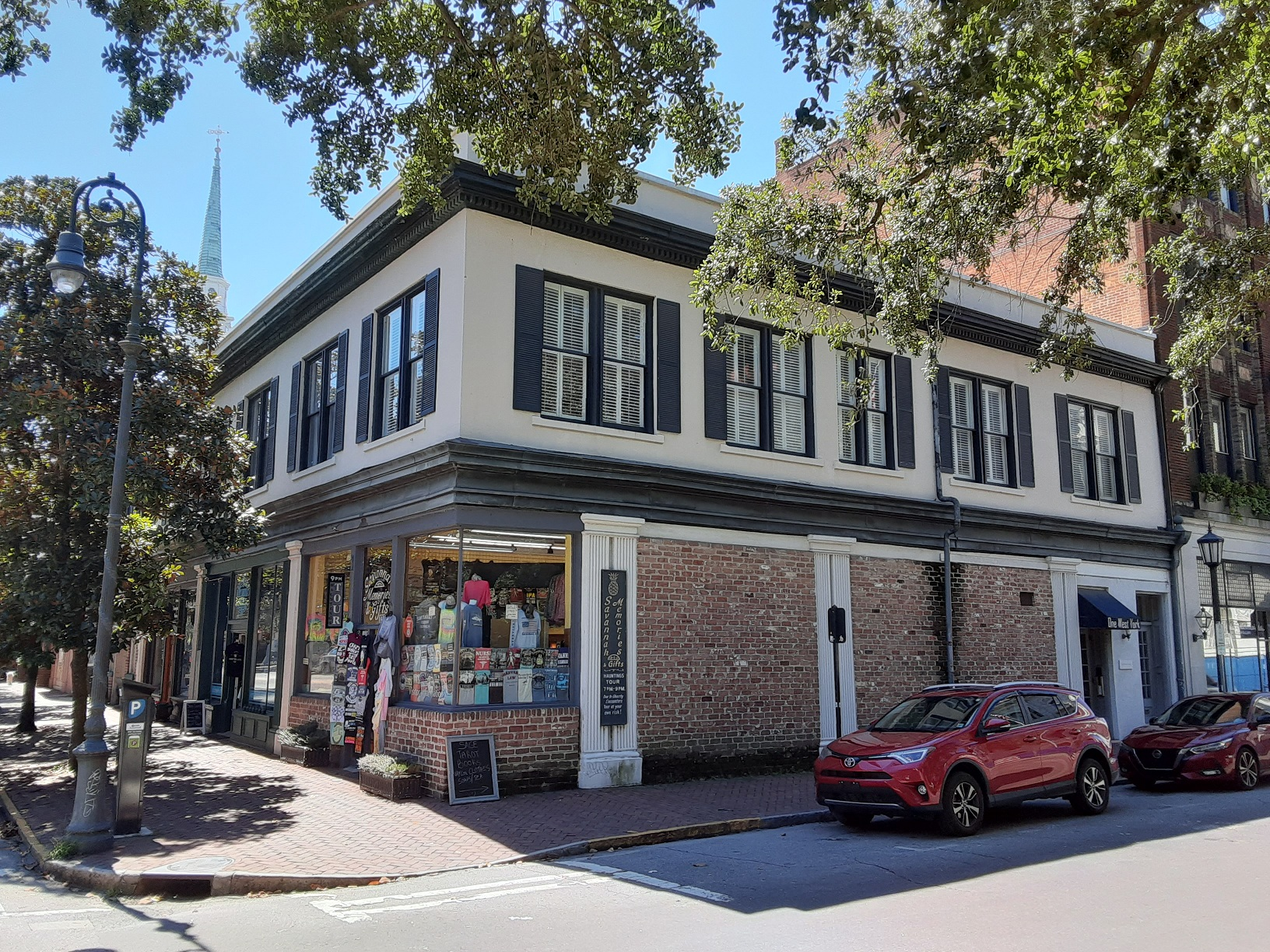
135–139 Bull Street

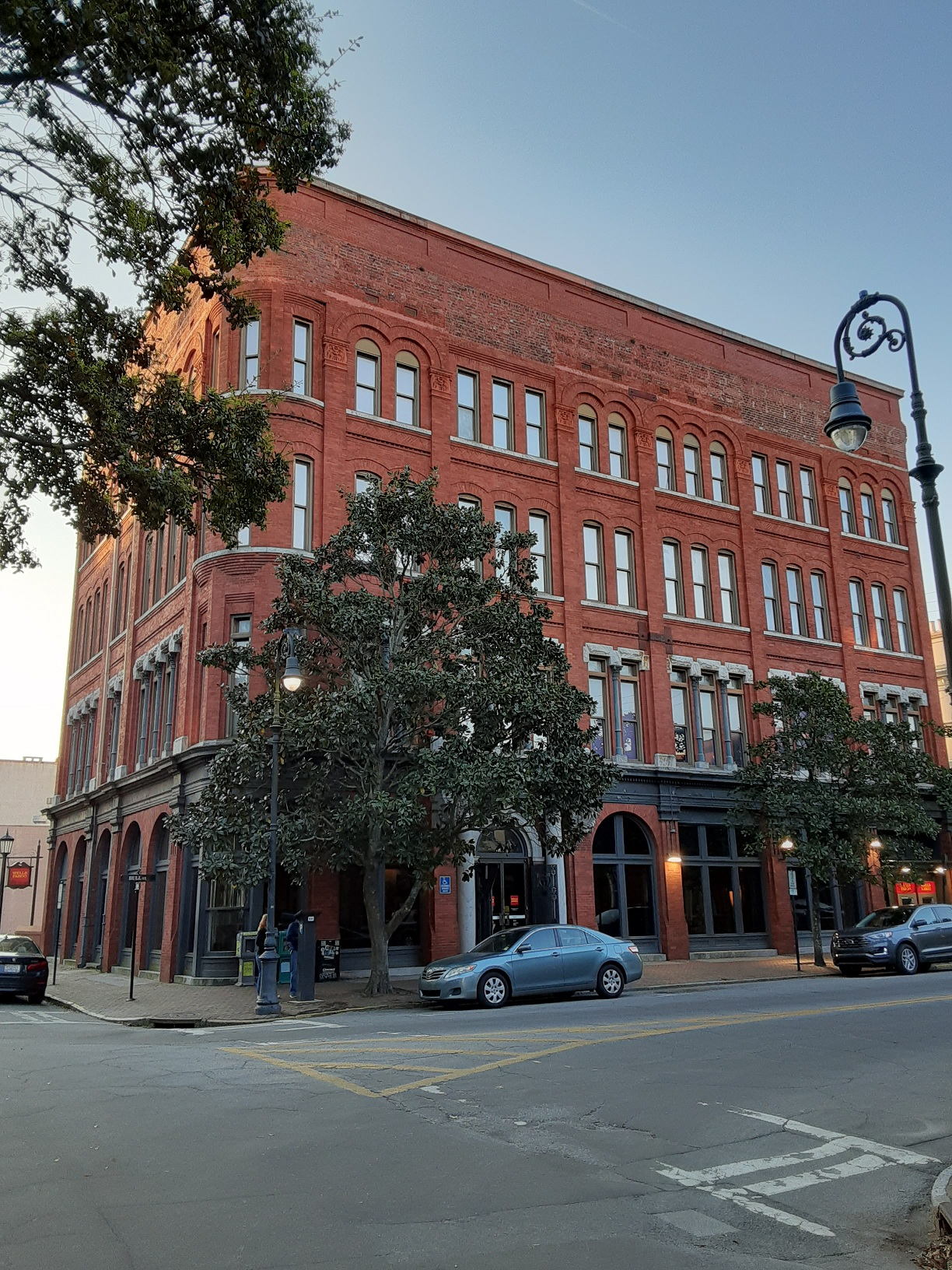
John Schwarz Building, 136–140 Bull Street

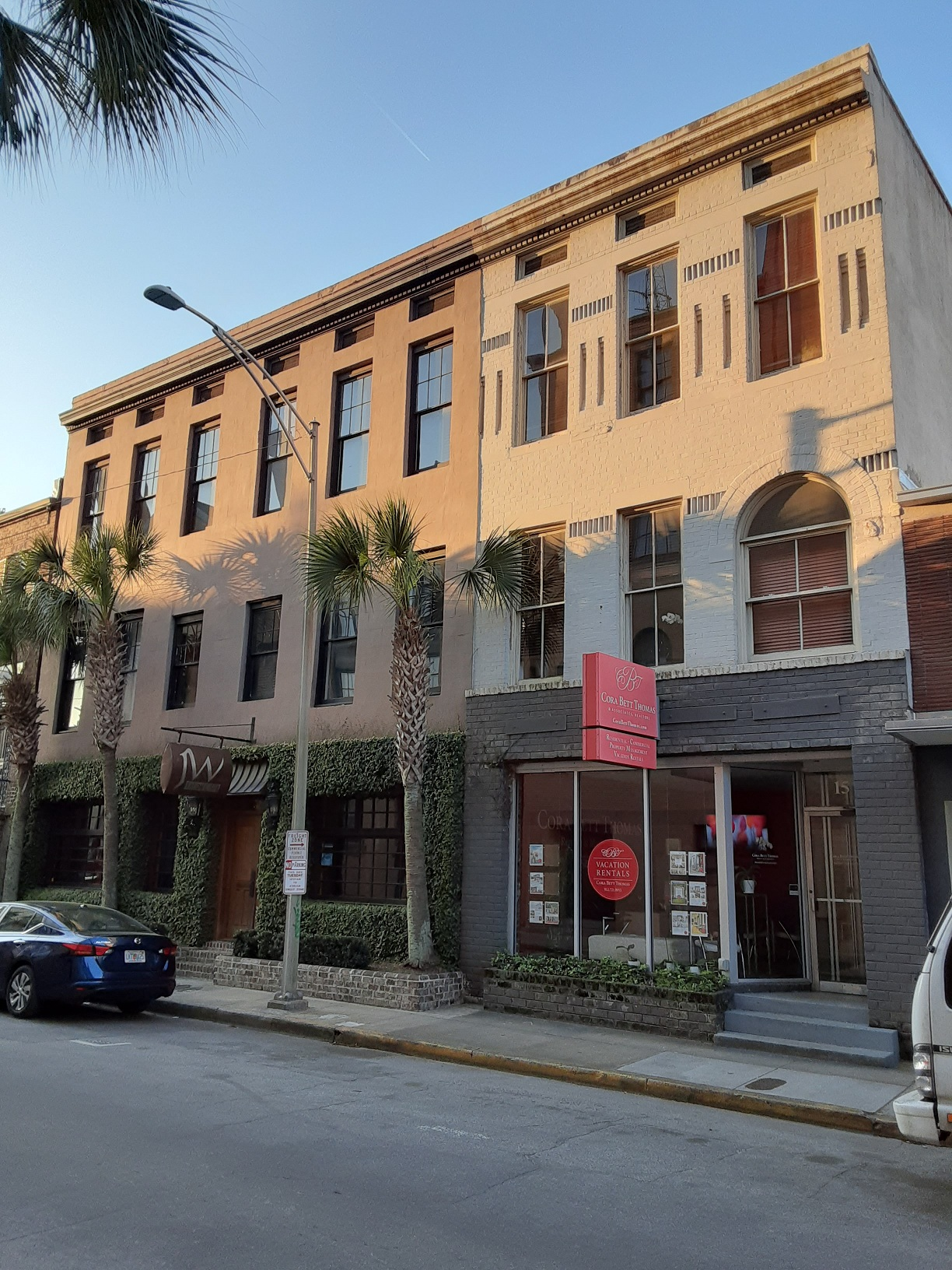
Peter Ott Property, 15–19 East York Street

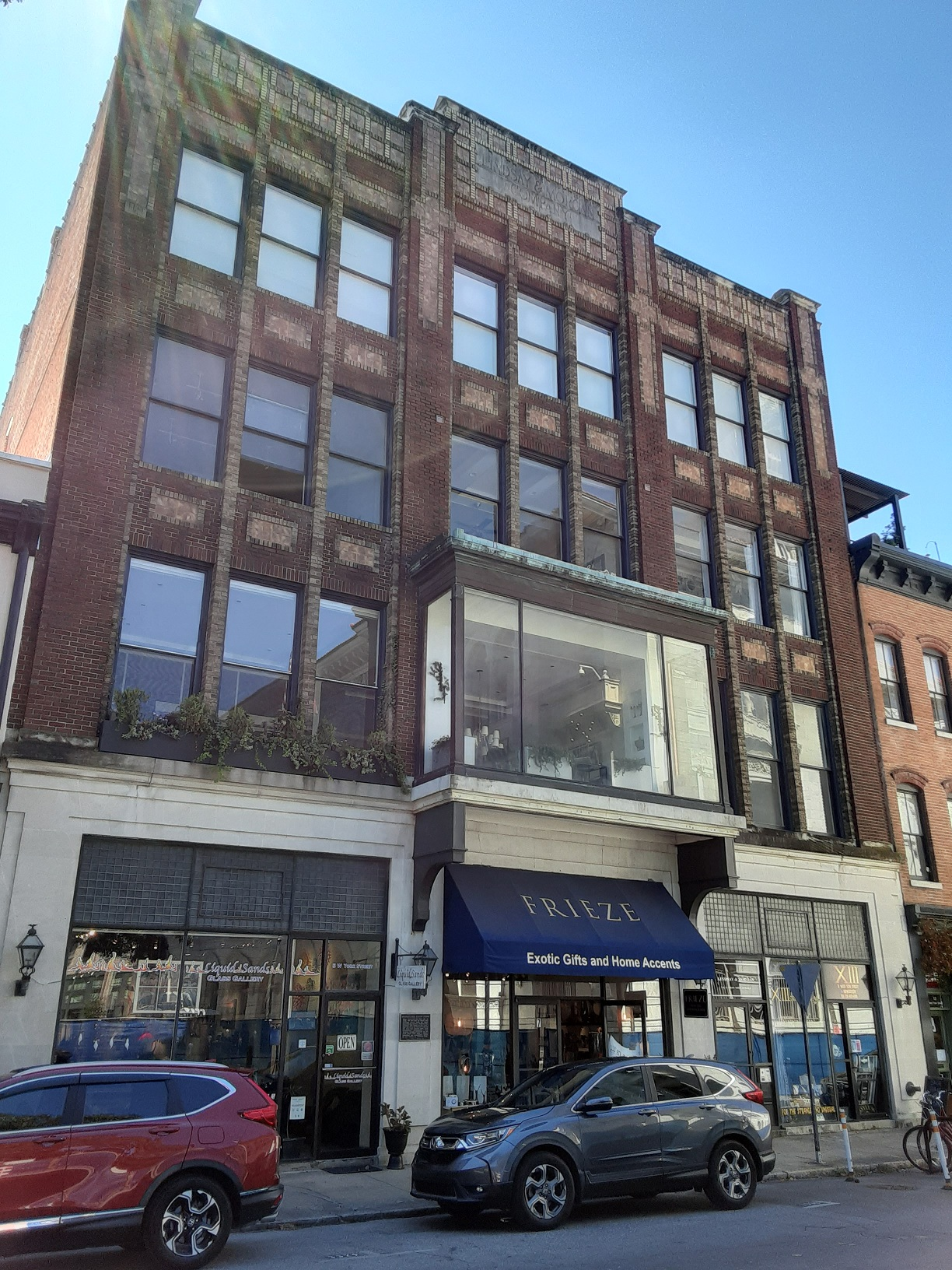
Lindsay & Morgan Building, 5–11 West York Street

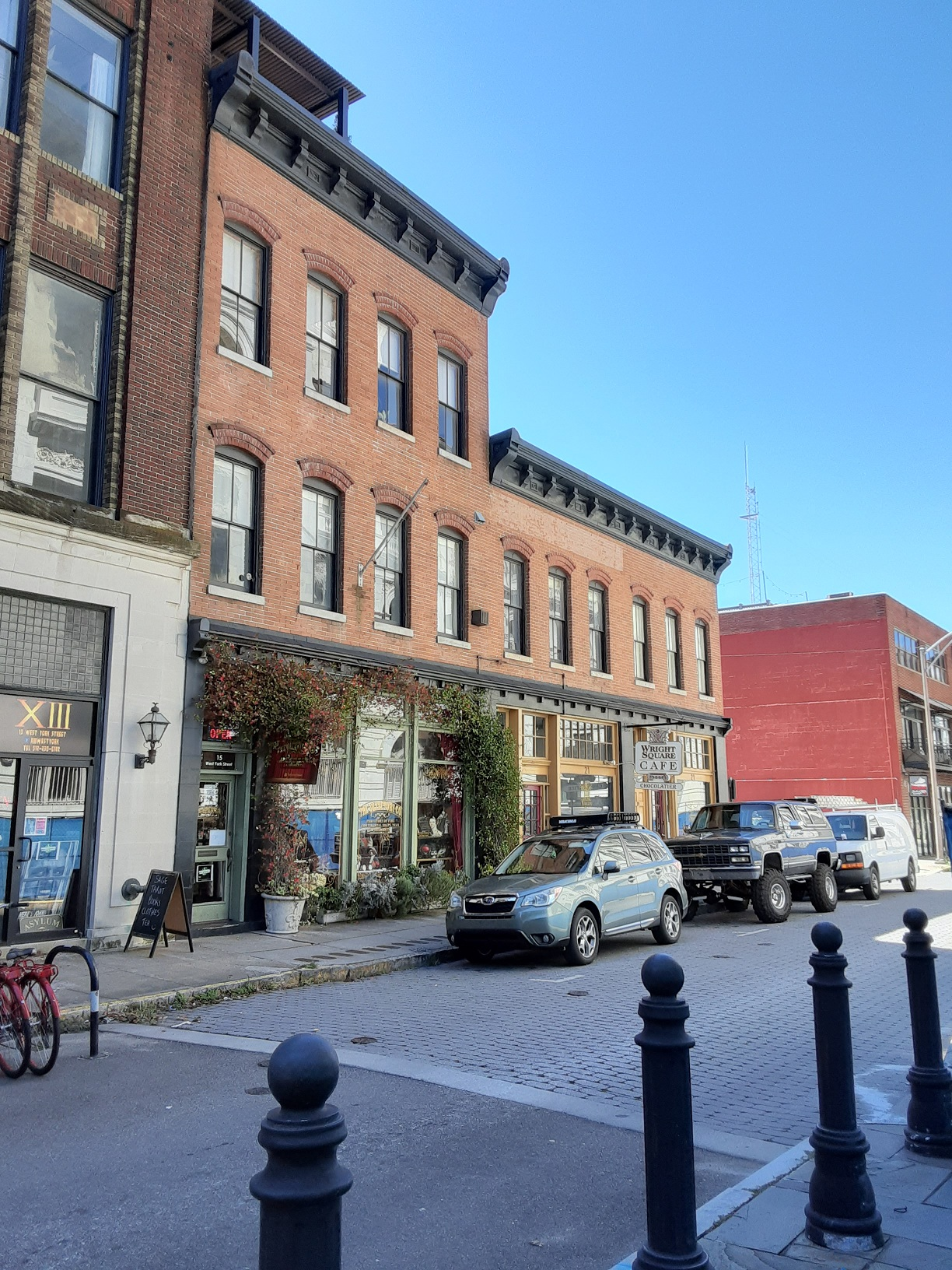
Thomas Henderson Building, 15–21 West York Street

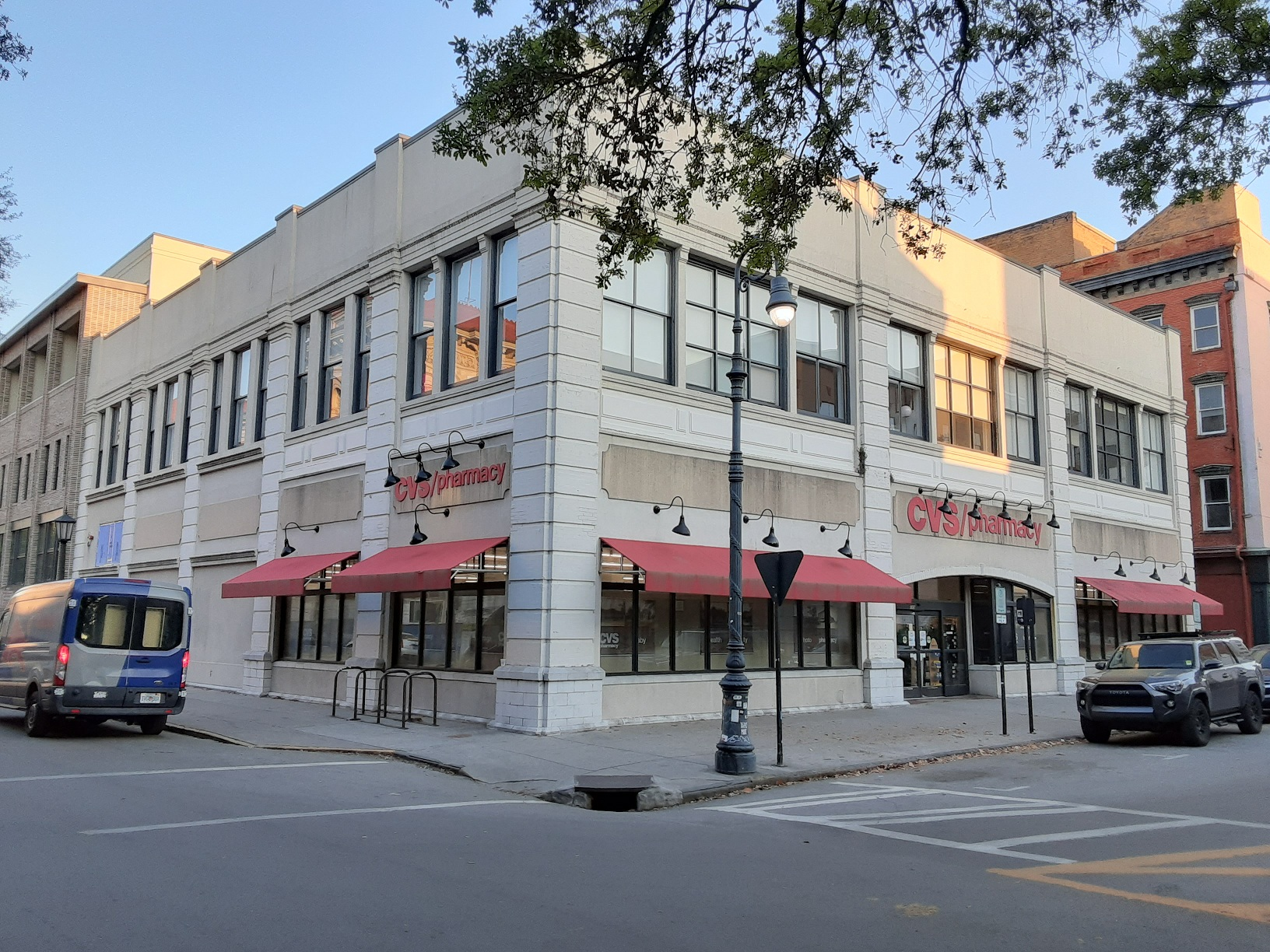
111–119 Bull Street

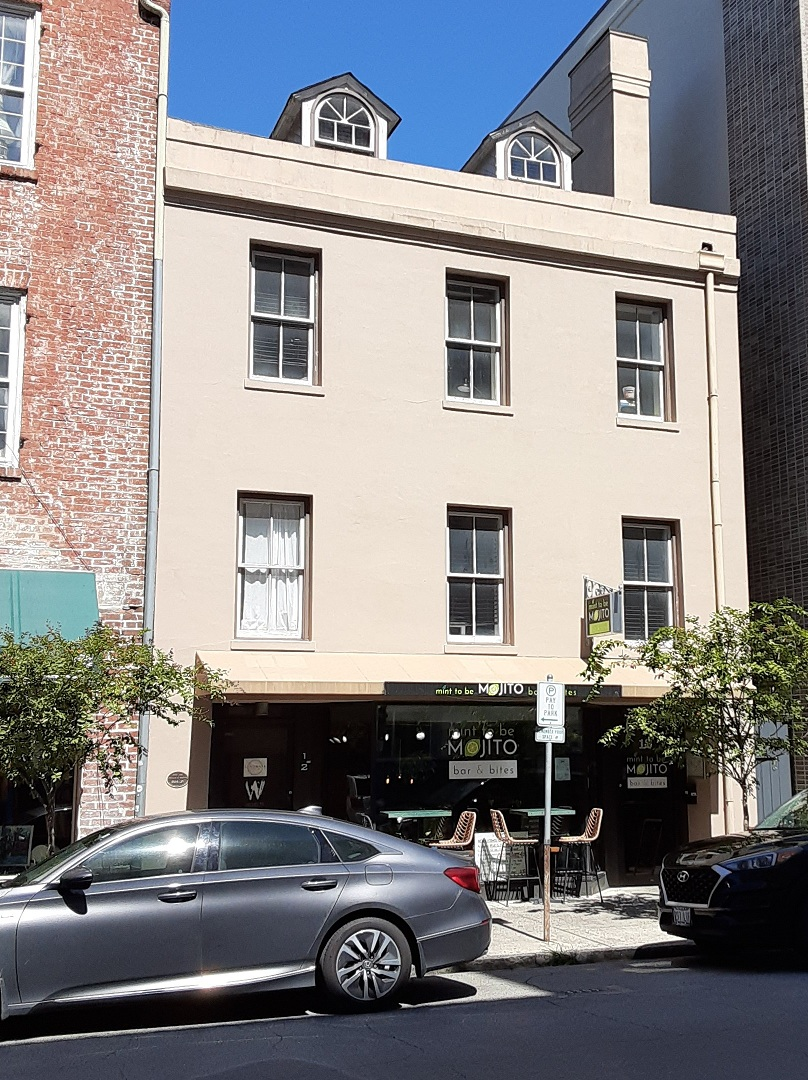
William Waring Property, 12 West State Street

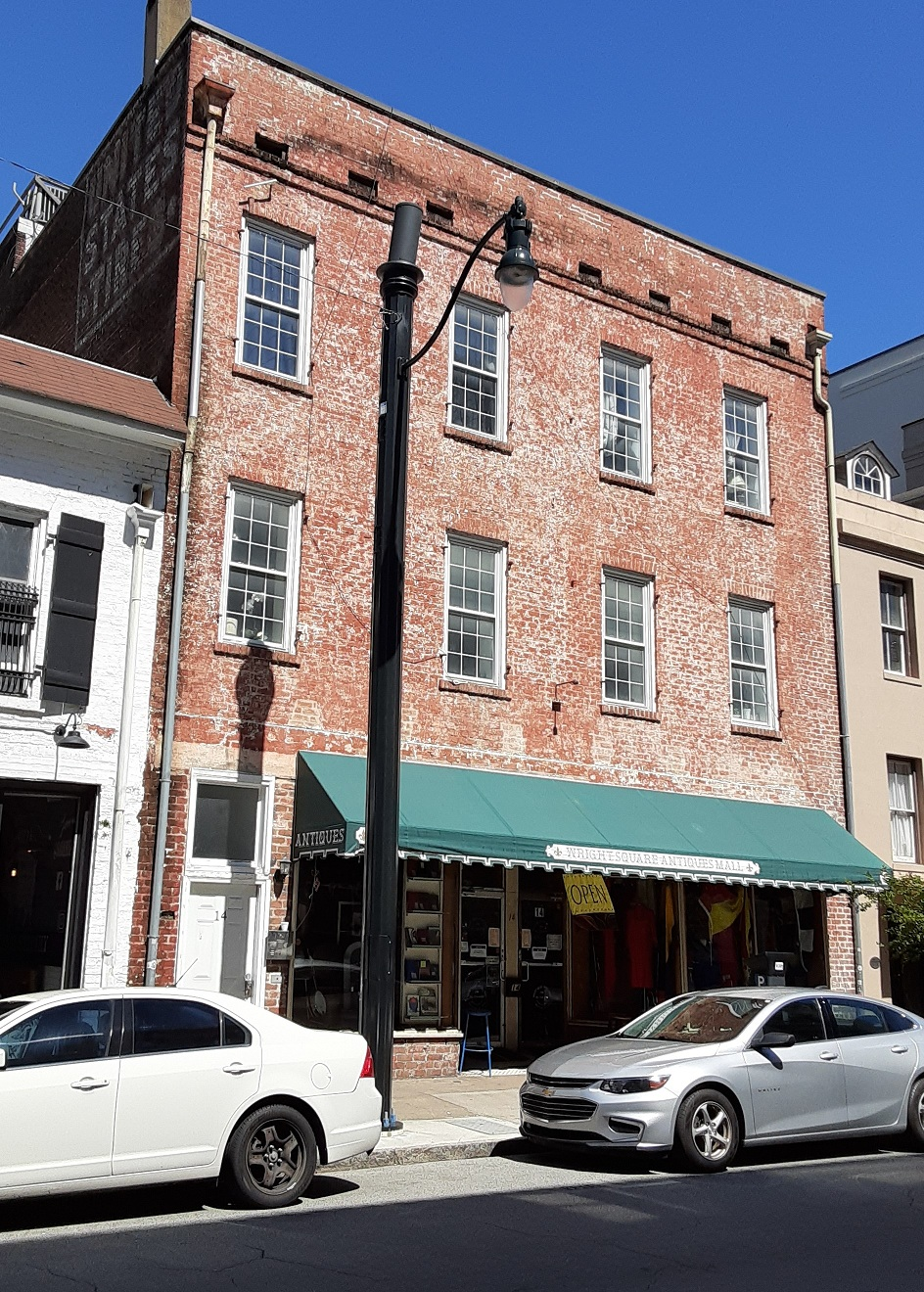
Edward Lovell Property, 14 West State Street

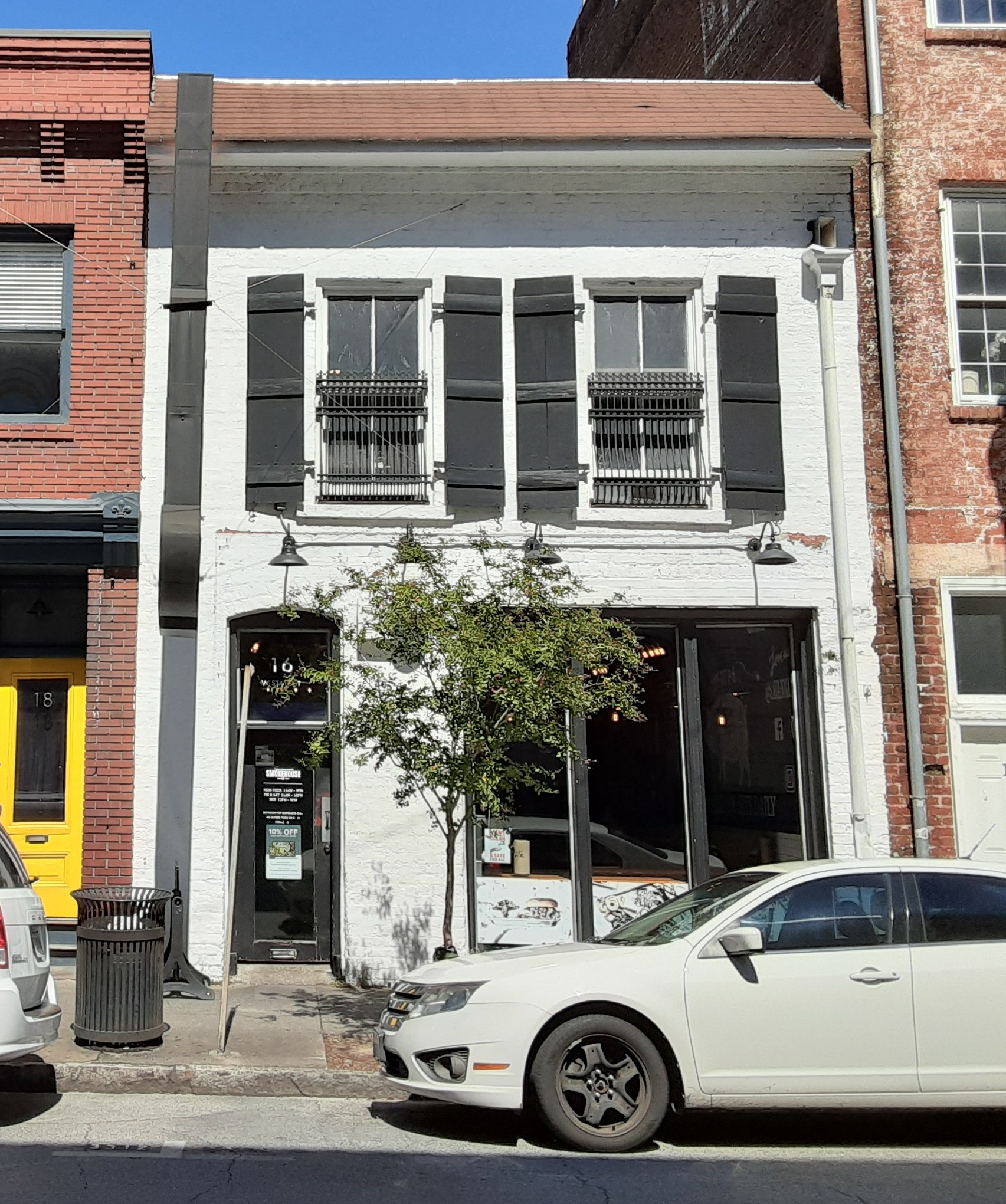
Isaac Morrell Building, 16 West State Street

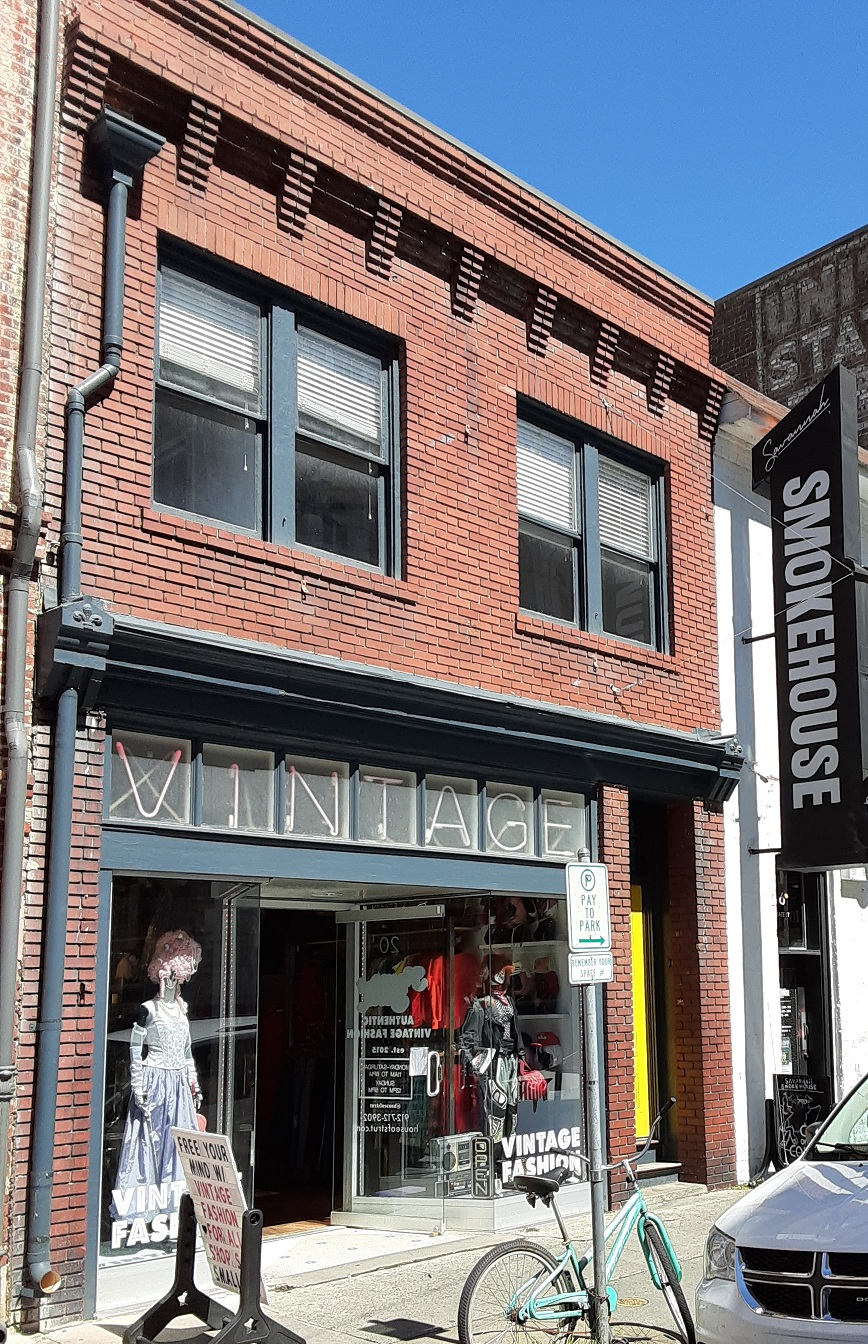
18 West State Street
