= Tomochichi Federal Building and United States Court House =

Historic United States federal building

- Federal Building and U.S. Court House
- U.S. National Register of Historic Places
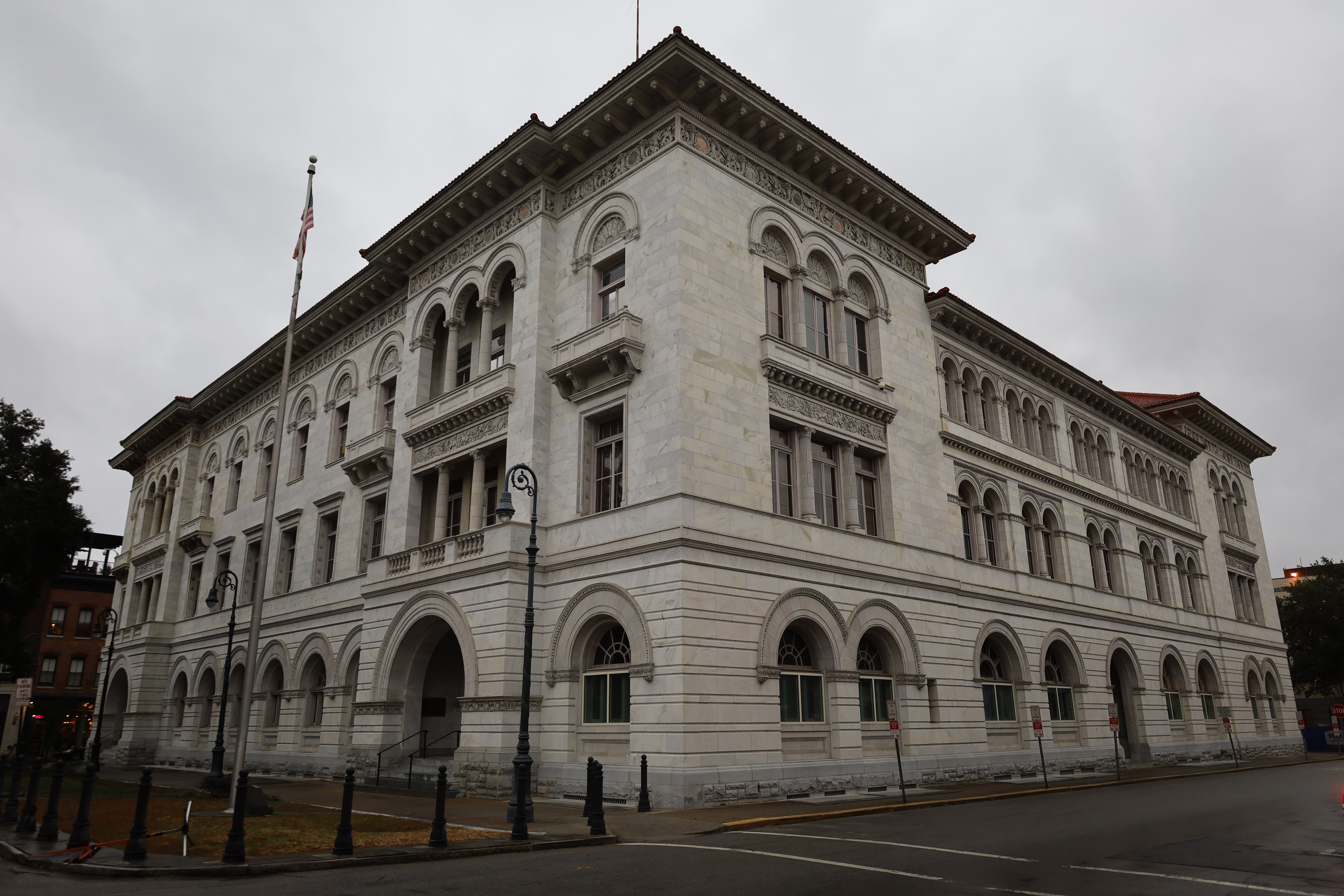
- Pictured in 2021

- Location within Georgia Location within the United States
- Location: Wright Square, 125 Bull Street, Savannah, Georgia
- Coordinates: 32°4′41″N 81°5′35″W
- Area: 0.8 acres (0.32 ha)
- Built: 1899
- Architect: Office of the Supervising Architect under W. J. Edbrooke; Jeremiah O'Rourke
- Architectural style: Late 19th And Early 20th Century American Movements
- NRHP reference No.: 74000663
- Added to NRHP: June 7, 1974

The Tomochichi Federal Building and United States Court House is a court house of the United States District Court for the Southern District of Georgia located in Savannah, Georgia. It was built between 1894 and 1899, and substantially enlarged in 1932. The building was listed in the National Register of Historic Places in 1974 as Federal Building and U.S. Court House, and was renamed in honor of the Creek Indian leader Tomochichi in 2005.

== Building history ==
The building is located on a prominent site within the city's National Historic Landmark District. The building occupies an entire city block on the western side of Wright Square, bounded by Bull, York, Whitaker, and State streets. The building makes an important visual contribution architecturally to the city due to the high quality of its design and materials, and as such is individually listed in the National Register of Historic Places. Designed in the Second Renaissance Revival style, with richly carved ornamentation, it is one of the most distinguished and imposing buildings of its era in Savannah.

The building was constructed primarily to house the Savannah post office, which was previously located in the U.S. Customs House. In 1889, work had just begun on a new post office at the corner of York and Abercorn Streets when construction was suspended because the citizens of Savannah wanted a "more suitable" building than the one originally planned. As a result, the U.S. Congress was persuaded to appropriate additional funds for the new post office, and in 1894, excavations began at a new site in the southern half of the block now entirely occupied by the building. This site itself was notable in Savannah's history as the former location of a courthouse where John Wesley, founder of Methodism, had preached in 1736 and 1737. The original building was designed between 1893 and 1894, during W. J. Edbrooke's tenure as Supervising Architect of the Treasury. The building cornerstone lists Jeremiah O'Rourke as the architect.

Originally designated as the U.S. Post Office and Court House, the structure was later renamed the Federal Building and U.S. Court House. By July 30, 1899, all departments of the post office were in the new government building. It also housed the U.S. Courts, the U.S. Engineers, and the U.S. Weather Bureau. The building was enlarged between 1930 and 1932 when it was extended north to encompass the remainder of the block. Today, the building serves as offices for the U.S. District Court and Court-related functions.

Updates on the building were funded in 2016; work started in 2021. The courthouse will be gutted and rebuilt to add room for additional offices. In February 2023, streets around the courthouse were closed after temporary support systems failed. In April 2023, 30 square feet of the third floor gave way while extensive renovations were taking place. Three or four construction workers were injured. An inspection into the structural integrity of the building took place, after which it was decided that renovations were necessary. The building will remain closed until late 2026 or early 2027.

== Architecture ==
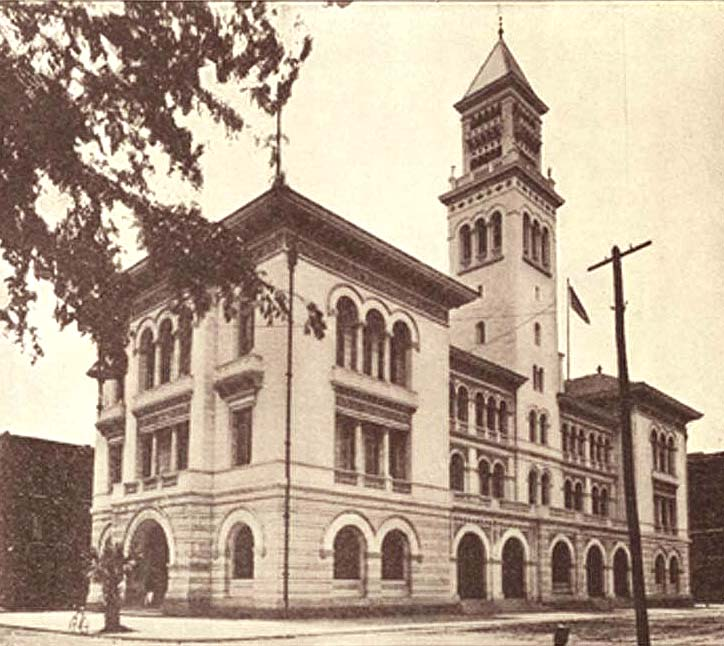
The court house in 1899, prior to renovations which more than doubled its size.

Designed in the Second Renaissance Revival style, the original portion of the building is constructed entirely of white Georgia marble and features the typical Italianate tripartite facade divisions characteristic of the style. The richly varied fenestration is one of the most prominent characteristics of the building. Various forms are skillfully used, resulting in distinct yet unified facade treatments.

The original portion of the Federal Building and U.S. Court House (visible on the York Street side and in the southernmost bay on Bull Street) is a richly ornamented, rectilinear building, to which an L-shaped wing was added in 1932 to form the current U-shaped plan. The main facade of the original building faced President Street. In the 1930s, President Street was closed and the building was extended north to State Street, enlarging it to over twice its original size. The 1932 addition was executed in marble with terra cotta ornamentation emulating the marble detailing of the original building.

The building is three stories in height, with a granite/ashlar foundation. On both the original building and the 1932 addition, scale is carefully manipulated as the building rises on the exterior-from the heavily rusticated base with massive semicircular arched openings, to the third floor where triple arched openings are used to give the appearance of a colonnade.

The building's exterior ornamentation, both that executed in marble on the original portion of the building and the terra-cotta detailing on the extension is rich and varied. Motifs relating to nature—including flowers, animals, and fruit- are incorporated into the frieze (the carved band below the eaves) alternating with medallions of various colored marble. Similar motifs are repeated above certain windows and at the bases of the main entrance arches. Two carved faces (one on the north facade and one on the south) are traditionally said to be likenesses of the architect, Jeremiah O'Rourke.

Arched entrance openings, which occur singly, in pairs, or tangentially connected, on the street level of the building give the appearance of an arcade. On the second level, flat-topped windows are recessed in double-arched openings, continuing themes established on the street level. These arched openings are successfully mixed with flat-topped window openings. The third level displays an even more intricate composition of forms. Here, flat-topped windows recessed in triple-arched openings are combined with flat-topped windows topped with elaborately carved semicircular panels. These latter openings, which are hung singly and in triplicate, provide continuous visual unification of patterns and forms. The elaborate carvings over many of the openings are similar to the stylized motifs found elsewhere in the building. The walls terminate in a Corinthian entablature consisting of an elaborate frieze, dentil course, and bracketed cornice. The red pantile roof with tile cresting and ornamental ball finials was manufactured by the well-known Ludowici Roof Tile Company.

One particularly imposing feature of the building is a 150-foot marble bell tower rising from the north center of the original 1899 building. The tower is square in plan with two levels of open loggias near the top. These loggias are arcaded with colored marble disks above the architrave on the first level and arched openings with a bracketed balcony on the second.

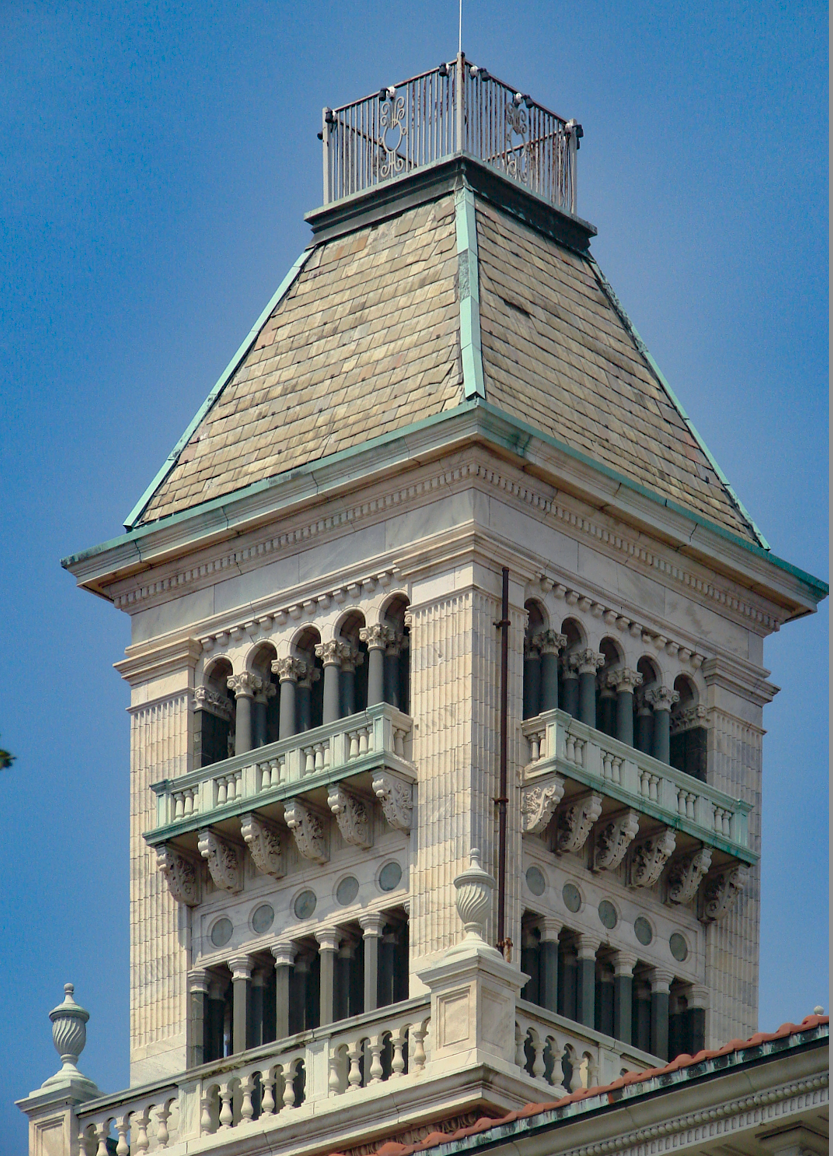
Top portion of the Bell Tower of the Tomochichi Federal Building in Savannah

Although the interior has been substantially renovated to accommodate various tenants through the years, original materials-including 1899 fireplace mantles in some rooms on the upper floors of the south wing are still evident in parts of the building. In other areas, later dropped ceilings have been removed, returning many rooms to their original height and exposing original window transoms. In the 1980s a new courtroom was constructed in the first-floor postal work area of the 1899 building. In 1995, the attic was converted to a fitness center with a cathedral ceiling. Recent U.S. General Service Administration preservation efforts include the restoration of the third-floor courtroom in the 1932 addition and the replication of historic lighting in the 1899 lobbies.

== Significant events ==
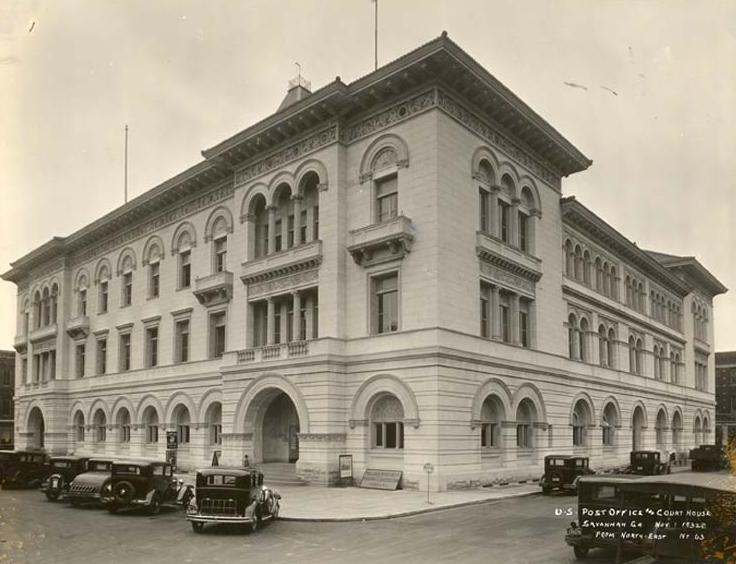
The court house as it stood in 1932, following renovations.

- 1894–1899: Construction of the U.S. Post Office and Court House, later renamed the Federal Building and U.S. Court House, takes place.
- 1932: A major addition more than doubles the building's size.
- 1974: The building is listed in the National Register of Historic Places.
- 1992–93: The U.S. General Services Administration completes the restoration of the lobby, third-floor courtroom, and other spaces.
- 1999: U.S. Postal Service vacates the building.
- 2023: An upper floor of the courthouse collapses, injuring three or four construction workers

== Building facts ==
- Architect: Jeremiah O'Rourke
- Construction Dates: 1894–1899, Addition 1930–1932
- Landmark Status: Listed in the National Register of Historic Places
- Location: 125-127 Bull Street, on Wright Square
- Architectural Style: Second Renaissance Revival
- Primary Materials: White Georgia marble, terra cotta, and marble ornamentation
- Prominent Feature: Marble bell tower and elaborate exterior ornamentation
