= 538 East State Street =

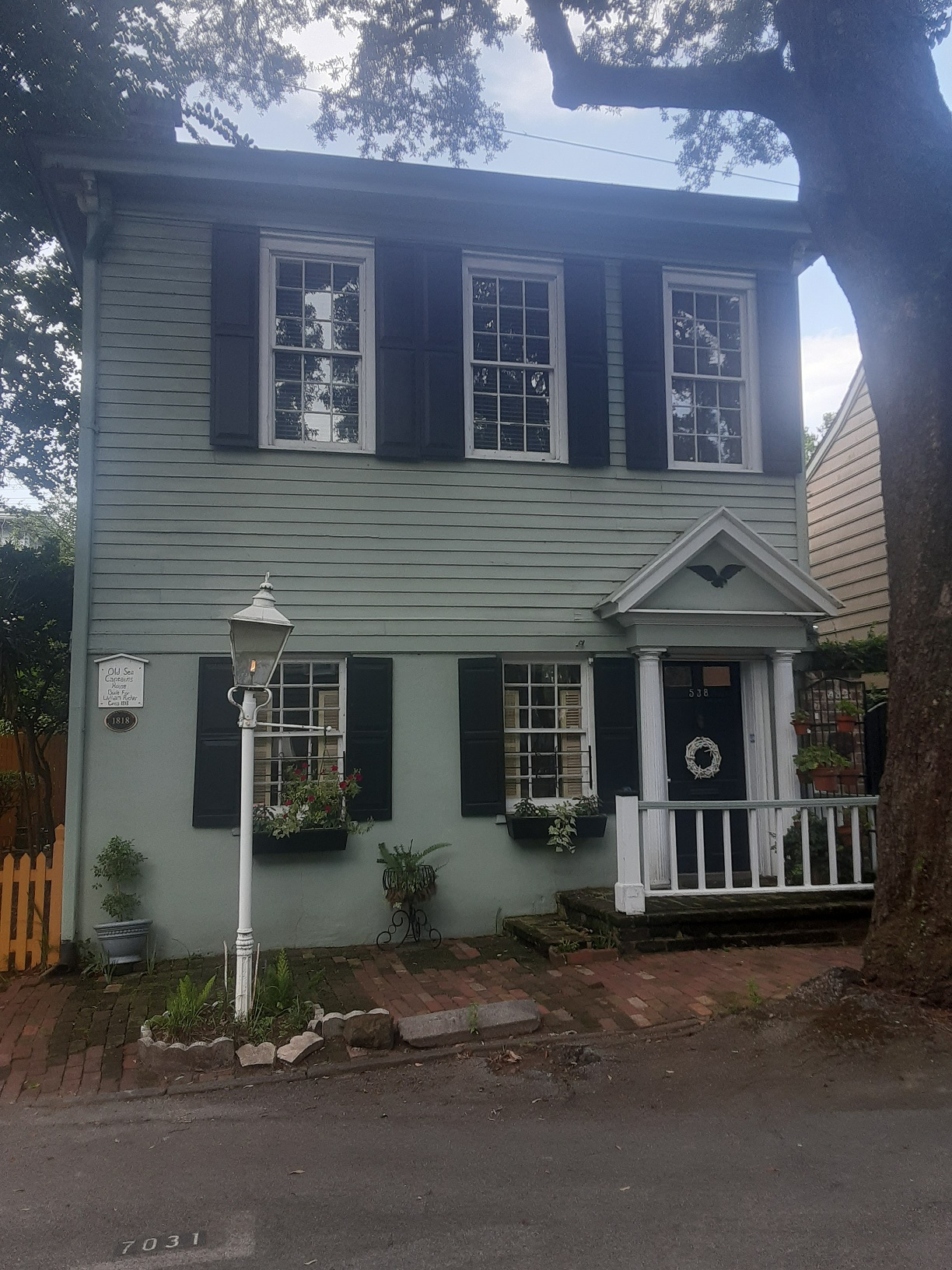
- The building in 2021
- Interactive map of the 538 East State Street area

General information
- Location: Savannah, Georgia, U.S., 538 East State Street
- Coordinates: 32.07665°N 81.08563°W
- Completed: 1818; 208 years ago

Technical details
- Floor count: 2

538 East State Street is a historic building in Savannah, Georgia, United States. It is located in the northeastern tything of Greene Square and was designated a historic building in 1973. Originally built for a William Ricker in 1818, it was later sold to an Abraham Ricker in 1821. Then in 1861 it was held by Joseph Burke, a cotton merchant and co-founder of the Bank of Commerce, until 1868. It is part of the Savannah Historic District, and it stands immediately to the east of the John Dorsett House, the smallest free-standing house in the city.

== See also ==
- Buildings in Savannah Historic District
