= Bradley Lock and Key =

Coordinates: 32.0781307°N 81.0913534°W

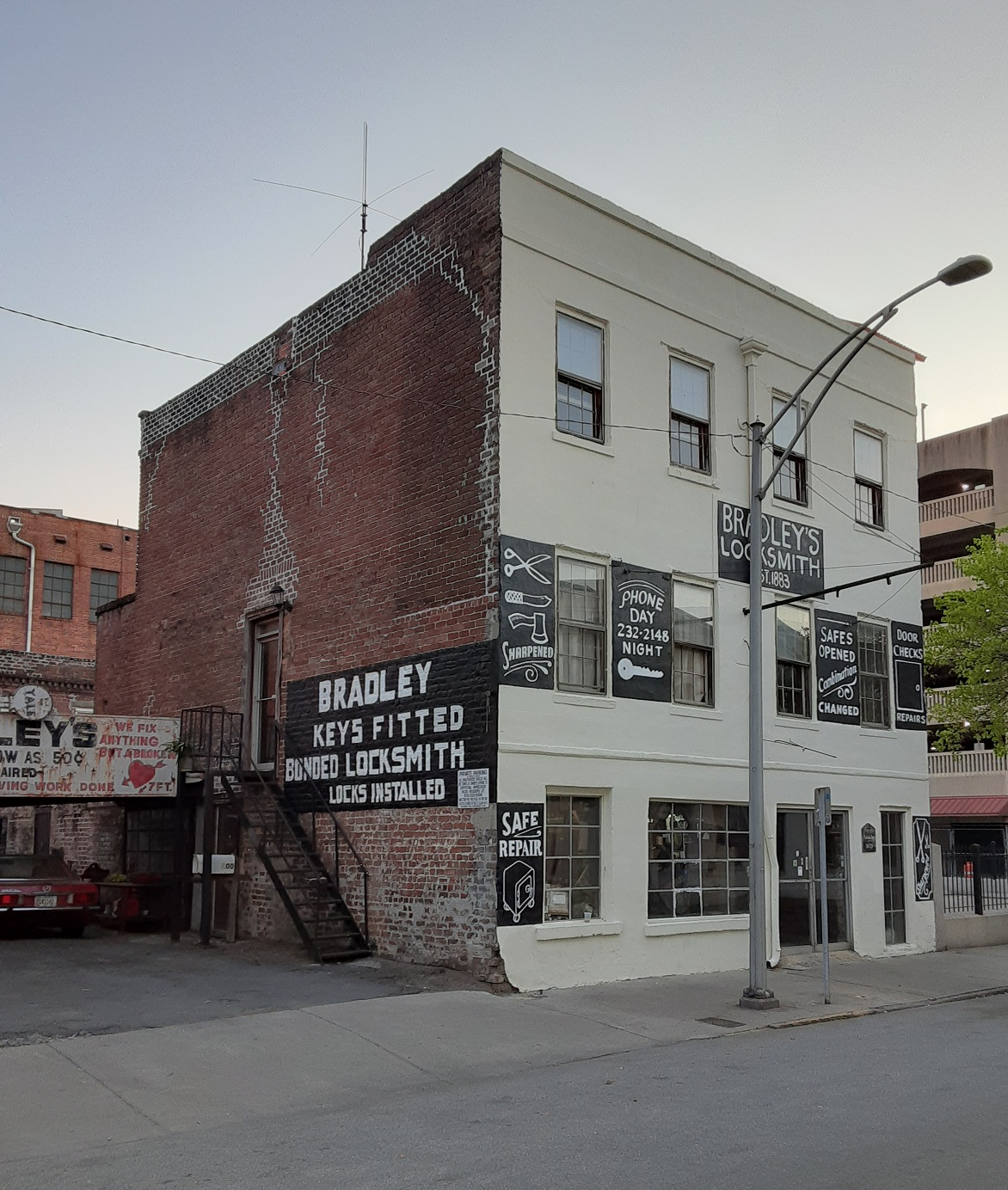
- The store in 2022
- Company type: Locksmiths
- Founded: 1883 (143 years ago)
- Headquarters: 24 East State Street, Savannah, Georgia, U.S.

Bradley Lock and Key, also known as Bradley's Locksmith, is a locksmiths located in Savannah, Georgia, United States. Established in 1883, it is the oldest business in operation in Savannah, and one of the oldest locksmith shops in the country. It has been located at its current address, the Patrick Duffy Building at 24 East State Street, in the northeast tything block of Wright Square, since 1967. The building it occupies was built in 1885.

Its owner from the 1950s until 2019 was William Houdini Bradley, known as Dini, whose grandfather, Simon, started the business. His father, Aaron, meanwhile, was a hypnotist who travelled with Houdini, hence William's middle name. A third generation of Bradley family members, William retired in 2019 at the age of 85, at which point he handed the business over to his grandson, 24-year-old Andrew Bradley, extending the business's lifespan to five generations. Andrew and his sister, Caroline, used to work at the shop in the summers of their youth. Dini Bradley's son, Mark, is a Savannah attorney.

The shop contains the W. W. Law stools from when it was Levy lunch counter during Savannah's Civil Rights era.

== Detail ==
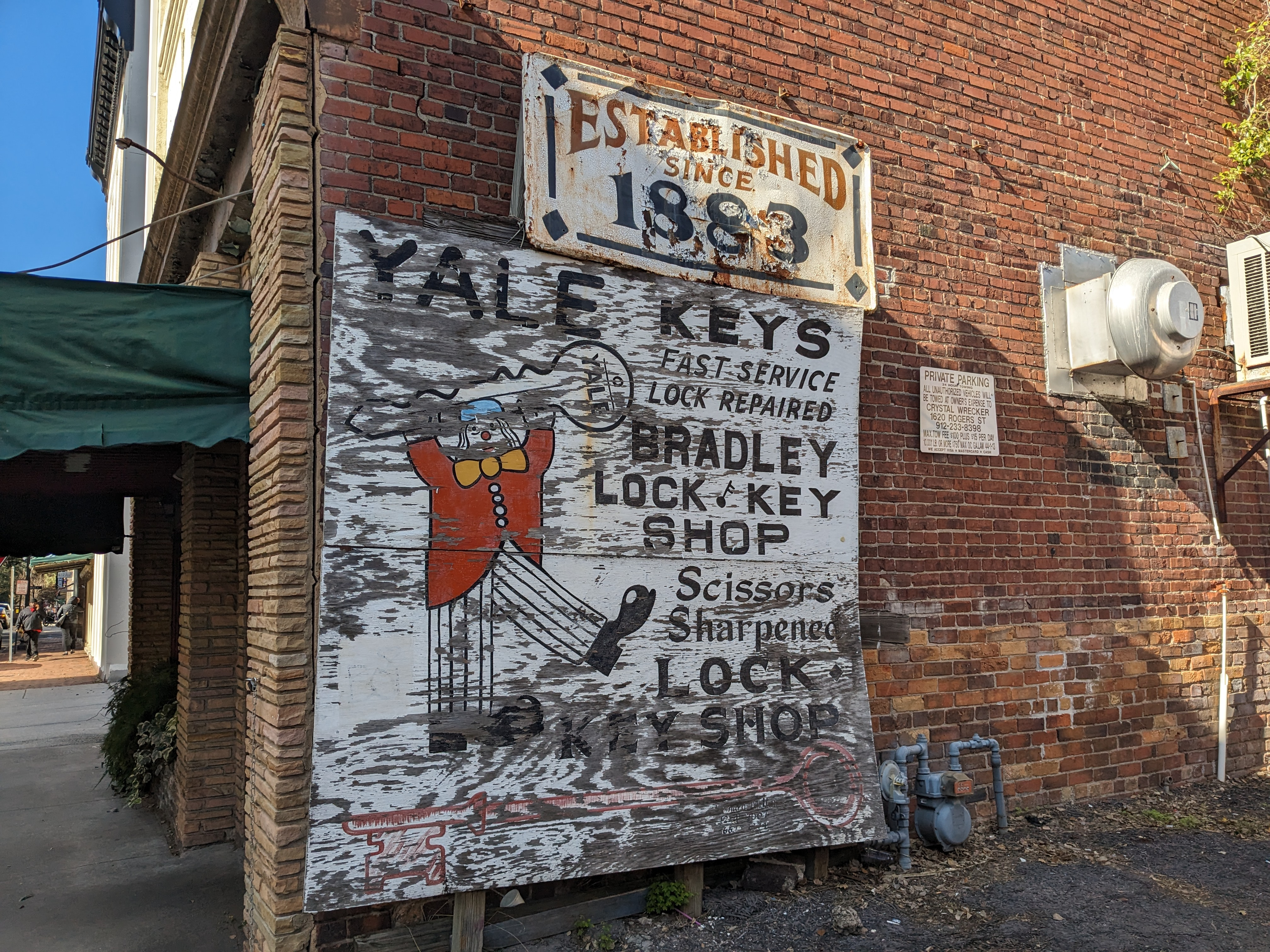
The right-hand side of the building in 2023

== William Bradley ==
William Bradley died on December 9, 2019, aged 85, and was buried in Savannah's historic Bonaventure Cemetery. He was survived by Riette, his wife of sixty years.

Bradley's brother, Milton, who was often present at the shop, was murdered in Savannah in 1994 at the age of 72. A World War II Navy veteran, he was one of six people murdered by serial killer Gary Ray Bowles. Bowles confessed to the killings but was not convicted until 25 years later. He was given the death penalty and died by lethal injection in a Florida state prison in August 2019.

Another of Bradley's brothers, Eddie, worked at the shop. He died in 2016, aged 89.
