= 532–534 East State Street =

- Interactive map of the 532–534 East State Street area

General information
- Location: Savannah, Georgia, U.S., 532–534 East State Street
- Coordinates: 32.07669°N 81.08579°W
- Completed: 1897; 129 years ago

Technical details
- Floor count: 2

532–534 East State Street is a historic building in Savannah, Georgia, United States. It is located in the northeastern tything of Greene Square and was built in 1897. It is part of the Savannah Historic District, and it stands immediately to the west of the John Dorsett House, the smallest free-standing house in the city.

== See also ==
- Buildings in Savannah Historic District
