= John Dorsett House =

- Tiny House
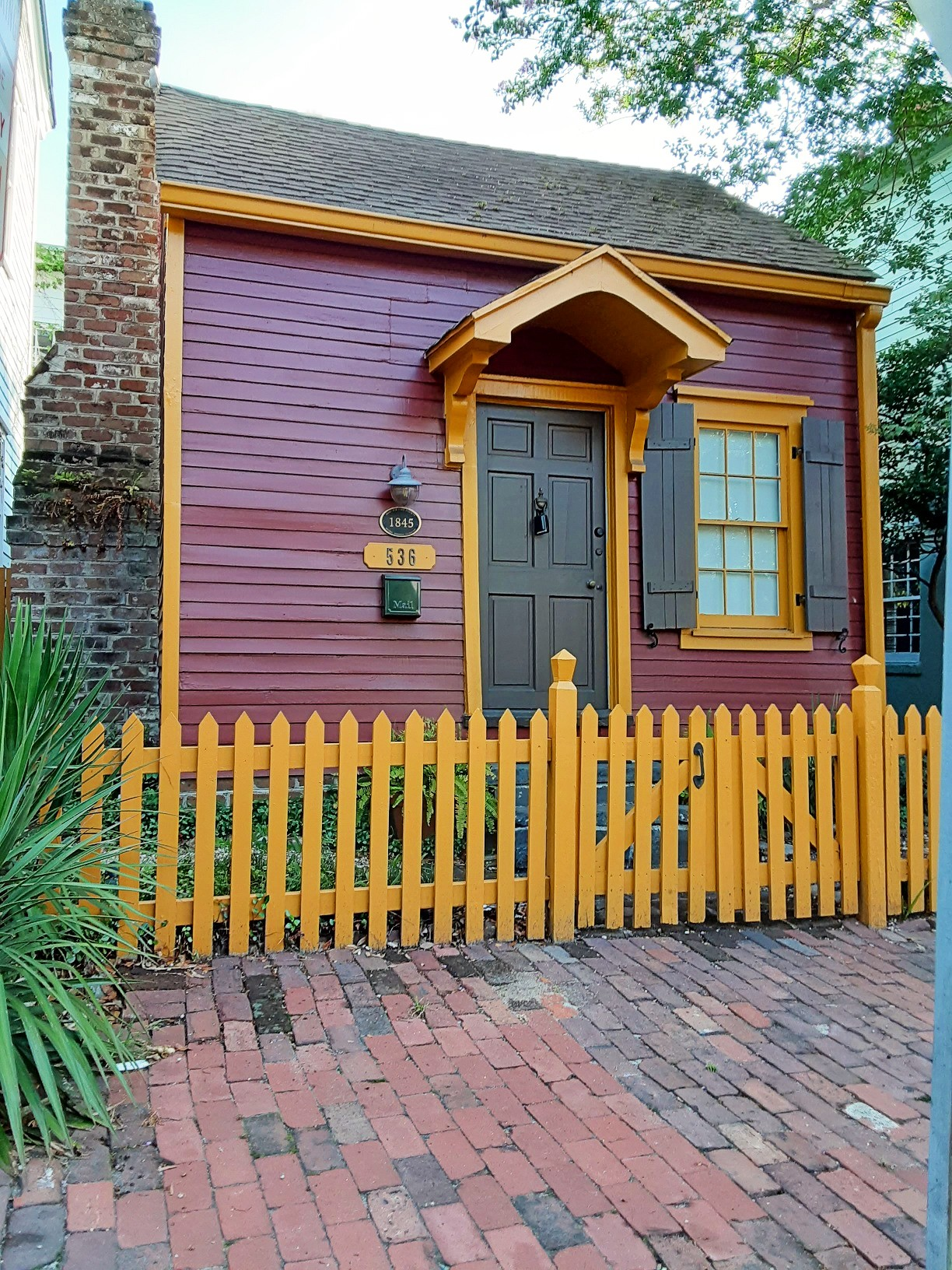
- The house in 2022
- Interactive map of the John Dorsett House area

General information
- Location: Savannah, Georgia, U.S., 536 East State Street
- Coordinates: 32.07667°N 81.08570°W
- Completed: 1845 (181 years ago)

Technical details
- Floor count: 1

Design and construction
- Main contractor: Dix Fletcher

References
- John Dorsett House
- U.S. National Historic Landmark
- U.S. Historic district – Contributing property
- Part of: Savannah Historic District (ID66000277)

Significant dates
- Designated NHL: November 13, 1966
- Designated CP: November 13, 1966

John Dorsett House (also known as Tiny House) is a historic building in Savannah, Georgia, United States. It is located at 536 East State Street, in the northeastern tything of Greene Square, and was built in 1845 for New York City-born shipbuilder John W. Dorsett by Dix Fletcher. The city's smallest free-standing house, it was moved from 422 Hull Street, in Savannah's Crawford Ward, in the mid-20th century. The structure is part of Savannah's Historic District.

Dorsett was the father of Charles H. Dorsett, president of Savannah's Peoples Savings and Loan Company. He was married, from 1838 to his death (around 1845), to Sarah R. (Fletcher). John died when his son was eleven months old.

== See also ==
- Buildings in Savannah Historic District
