= Gordon Row =

Historic row house in Savannah, Georgia, United States

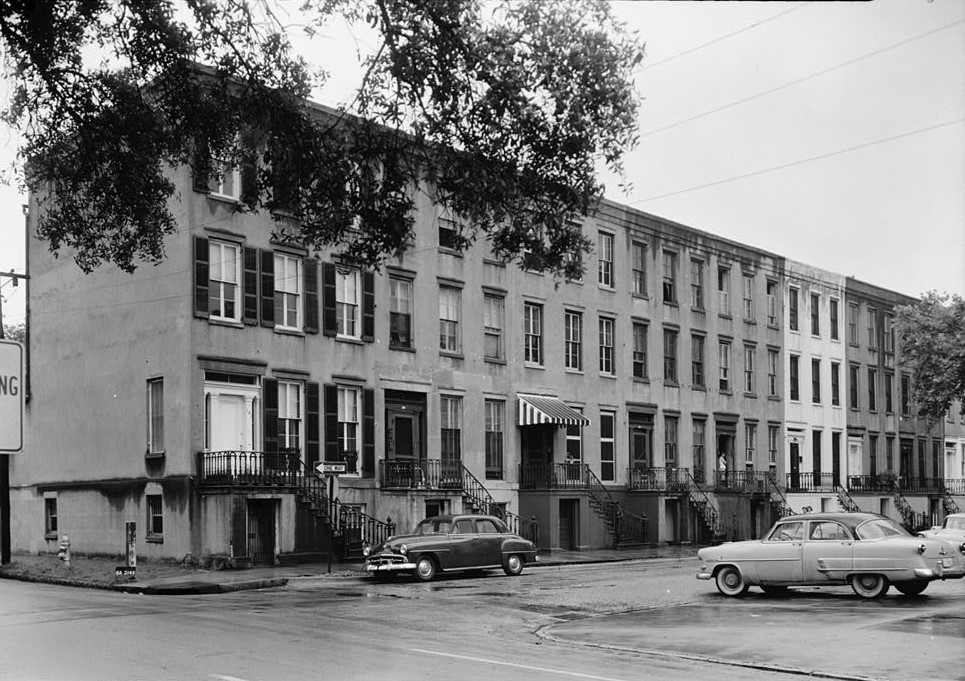
- Gordon Row in the mid-20th century. Viewed from Whitaker Street, looking west
- Interactive map of the Gordon Row area

General information
- Architectural style: Romanesque Revival
- Location: Chatham Square, Savannah, Georgia, U.S., 101–129 West Gordon Street
- Coordinates: 32.0713°N 81.0966°W
- Completed: 1854; 172 years ago

Technical details
- Floor count: 3 (plus raised basement)

Gordon Row (also known as Gordon Block) is a historic row house in Savannah, Georgia, United States. The largest single row-house in Savannah, it comprises fifteen homes (or "units") located between 101 and 129 West Gordon Street in the southeastern residential block of Chatham Square. Completed in 1854, it is a contributing property of the Savannah Historic District, itself on the National Register of Historic Places, as are its standing carriage houses to the rear. The row occupies the entire block between Barnard Street on the west and Whitaker Street on the east and sits directly across Chatham Square from Quantock Row on Taylor Street.

The properties were built between 1853 and 1855 for prospective use as renter-occupied houses in the city's blossoming market.

After falling into disrepair, the properties were renovated in the mid-20th century by the Historic Savannah Foundation.

Other similar-style row houses exist in Savannah's Scudder's Row, the two Quantock Rows (of Taylor Street and Jones Street), William Remshart Row House, McDonough Row and Mary Marshall Row.

== Gallery ==
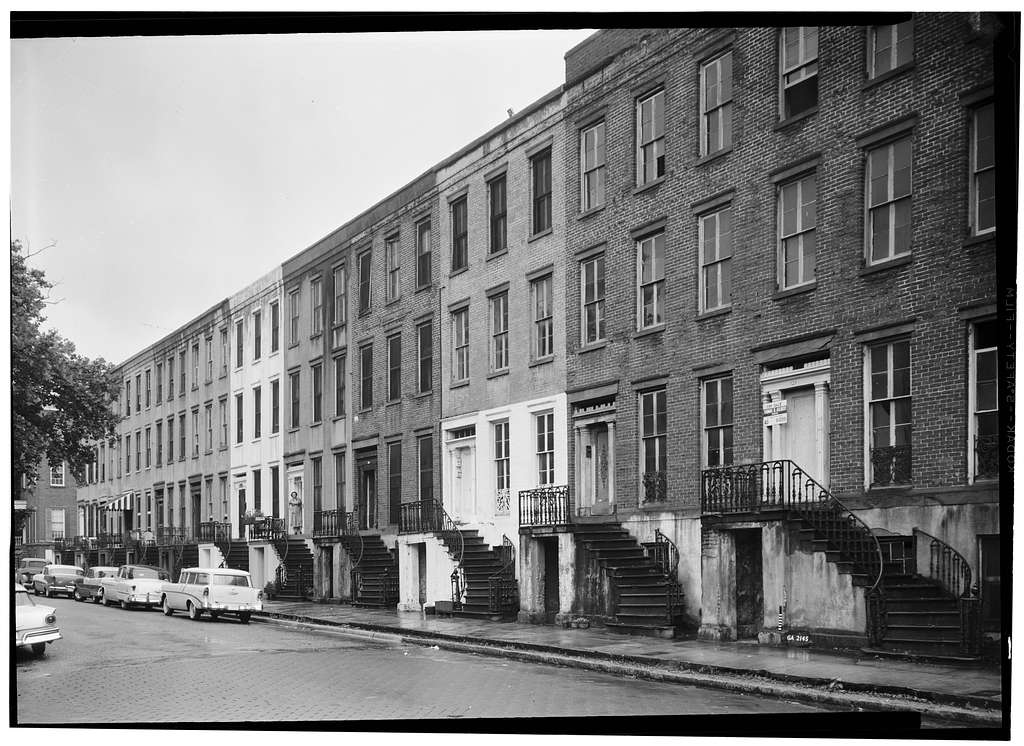
View from its western end

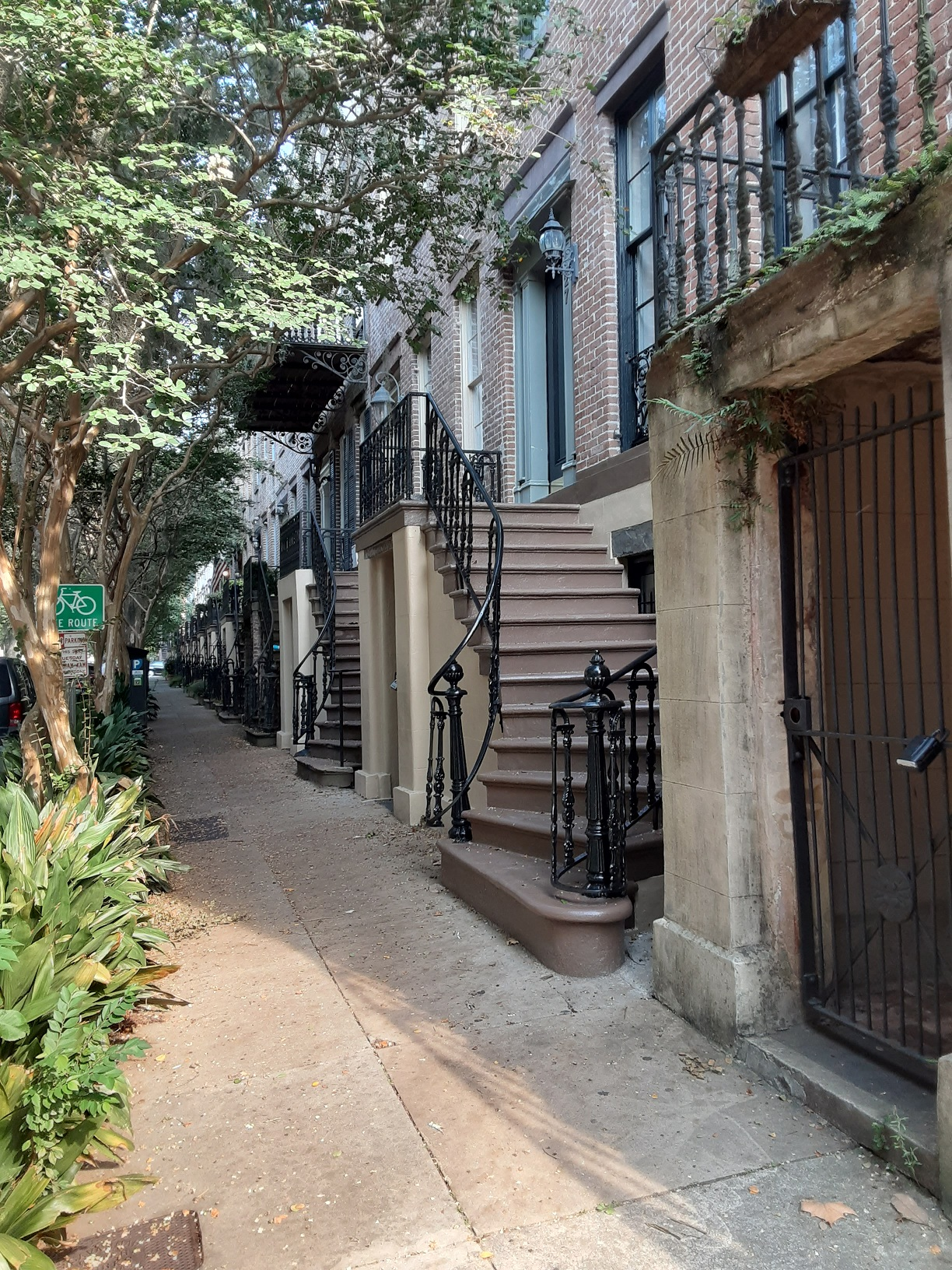
View from sidewalk, 2021

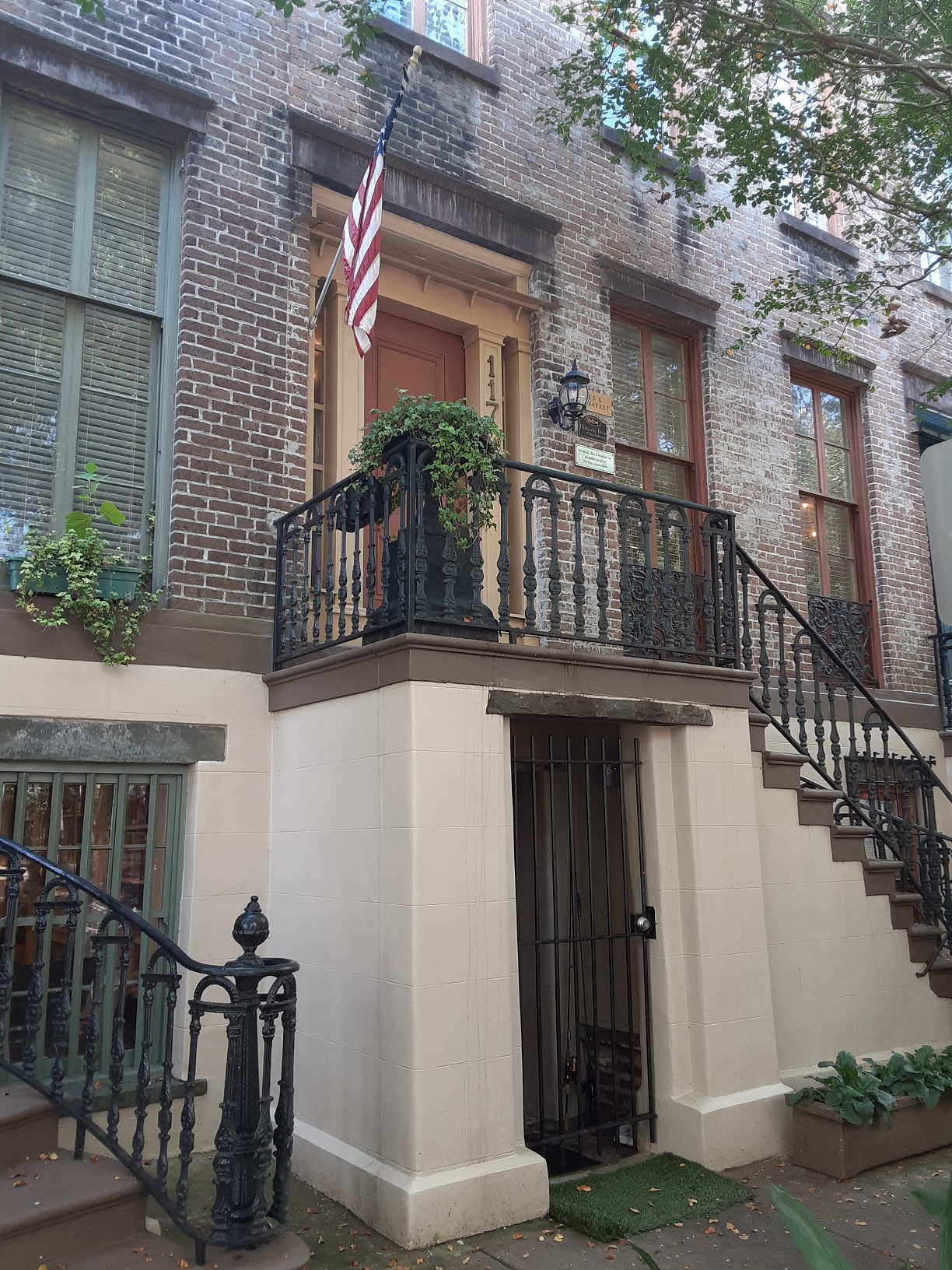
117 West Gordon, 2021

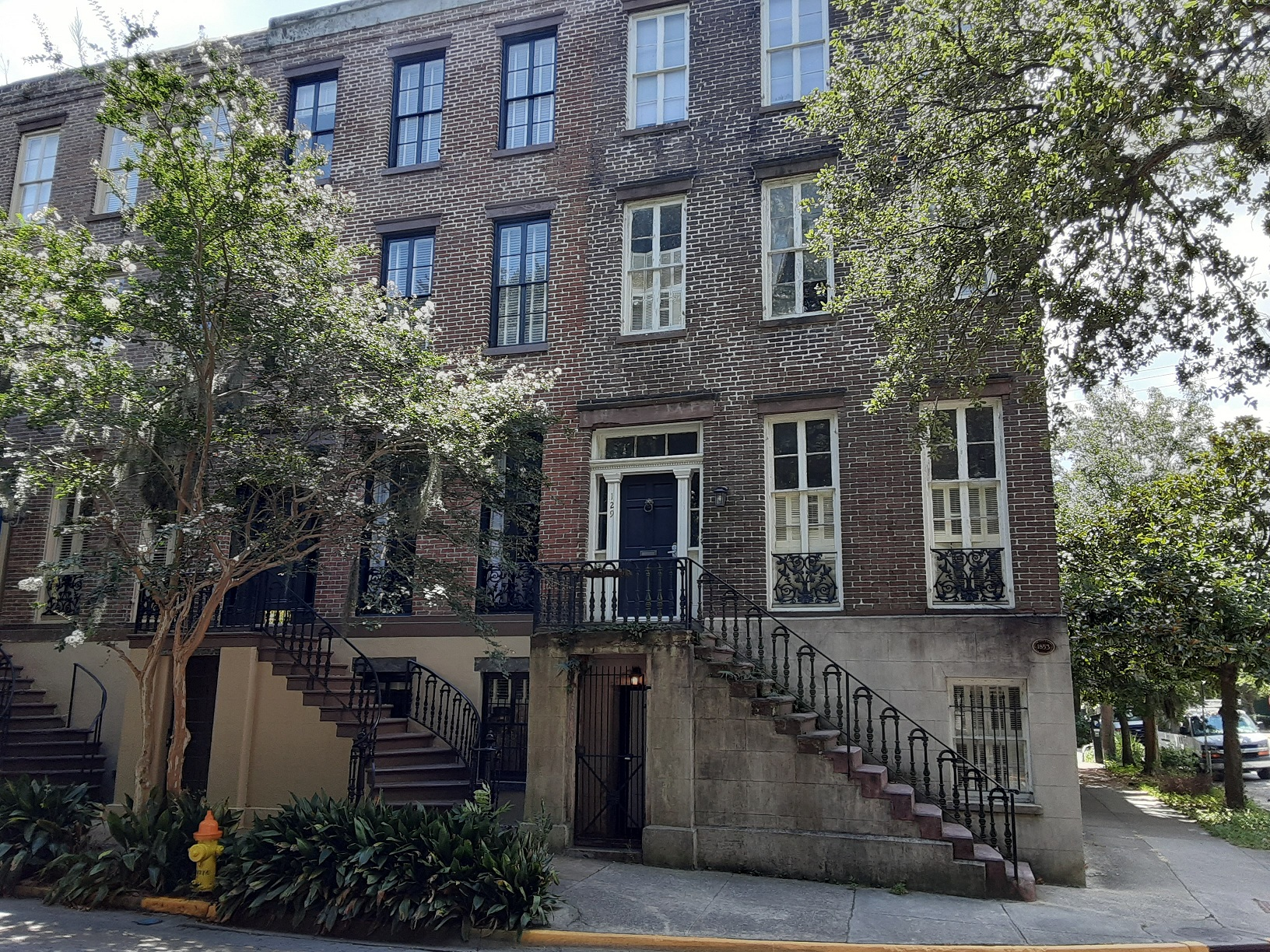
127-129 West Gordon, 2021

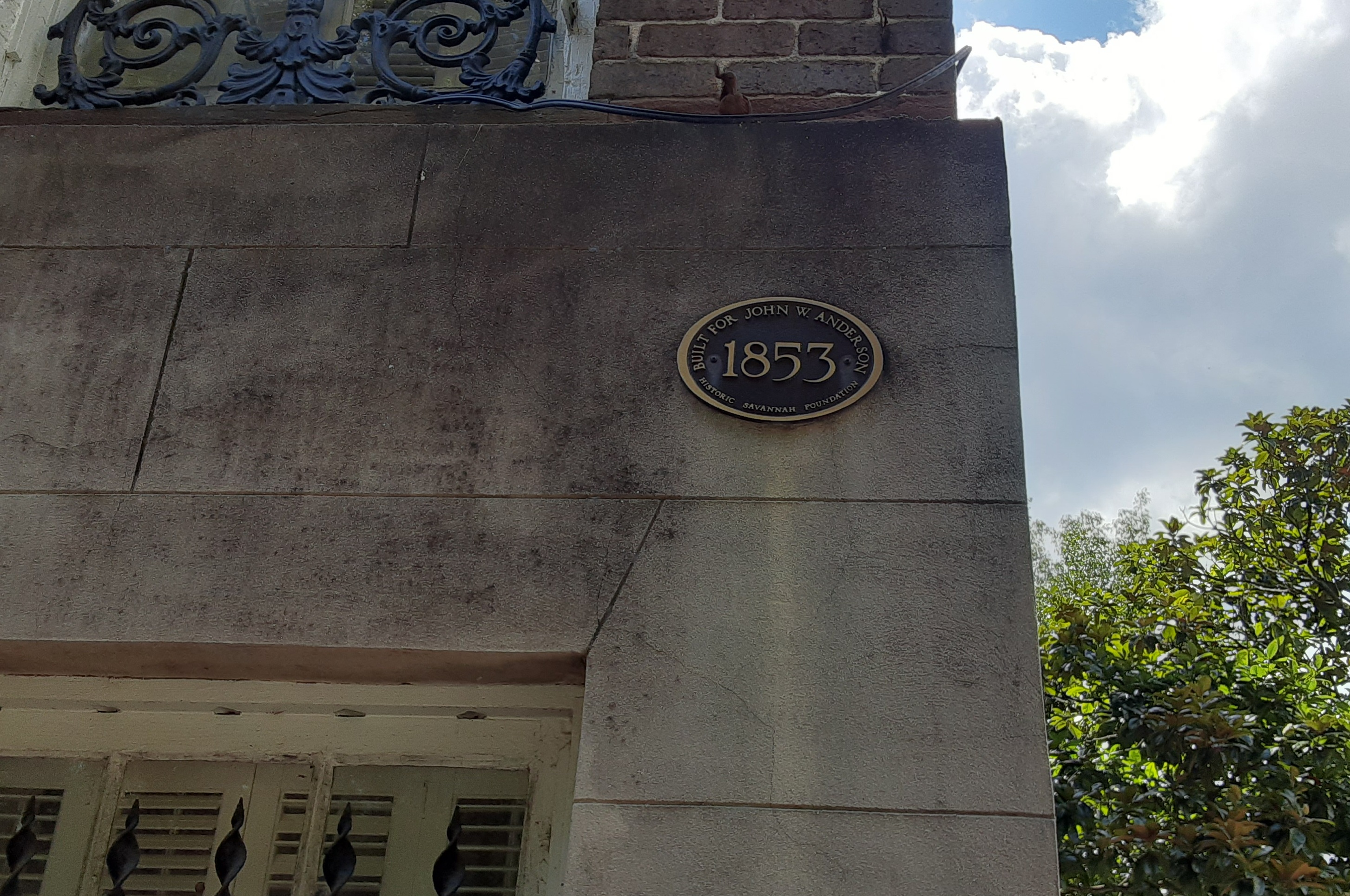
Date plaque

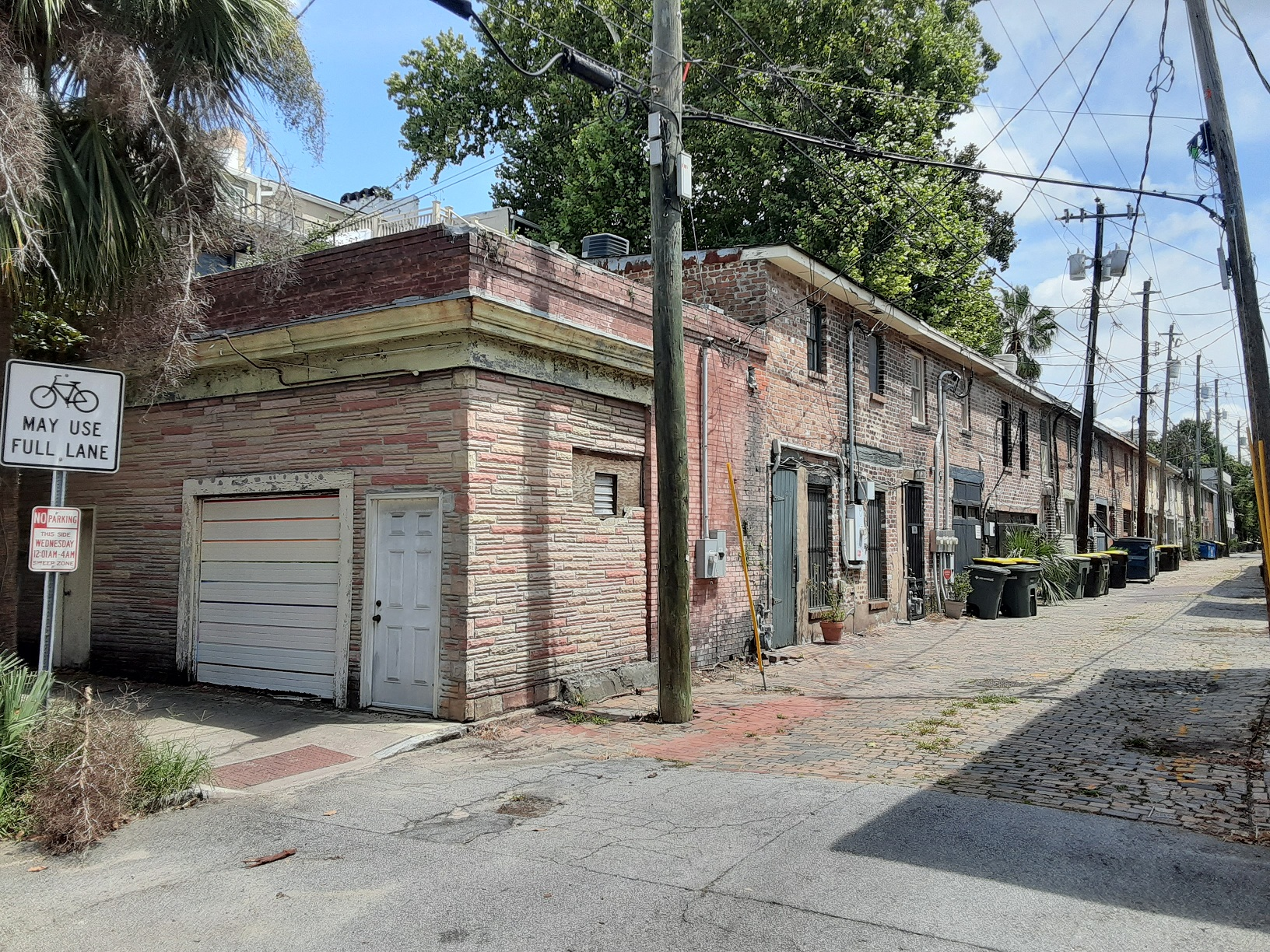
Ramshackle line of carriage houses at the rear, 2021

== See also ==
- Buildings in Savannah Historic District
