= Quantock Row =

Quantock Row refers to two row houses in Savannah, Georgia:

- Quantock Row (Chatham Square), built in 1852
- Quantock Row (Jones Street), built in 1854
