= Gordon Street (Savannah, Georgia) =

Street in Savannah, Georgia

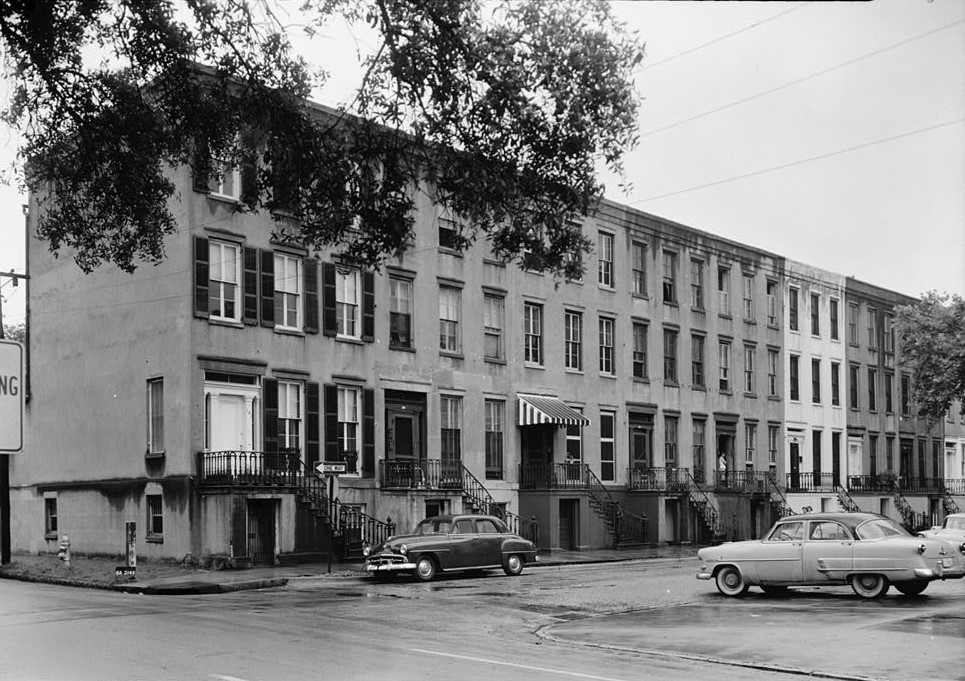
- Gordon Row, 101–129 West Gordon Street in Chatham Square
- Length: 0.62 mi (1.00 km)
- Location: Savannah, Georgia, U.S.
- West end: Martin Luther King Jr. Boulevard
- East end: East Broad Street

Gordon Street is a street in Savannah, Georgia, United States. Located between Taylor Street to the north and Gaston Street to the south, it runs for about 0.62 miles (1.00 km) from Martin Luther King Jr. Boulevard in the west to East Broad Street in the east. Originally known only as Gordon Street singular, its addresses are now split between "West Gordon Street" and "East Gordon Street", the transition occurring at Bull Street in the center of the downtown area.

The street is entirely within Savannah Historic District, a National Historic Landmark District.

Gordon Street passes through four squares on their southern side. From west to east:

- Chatham Square
- Monterey Square
- Taylor Square
- Whitefield Square

== Notable buildings and structures ==
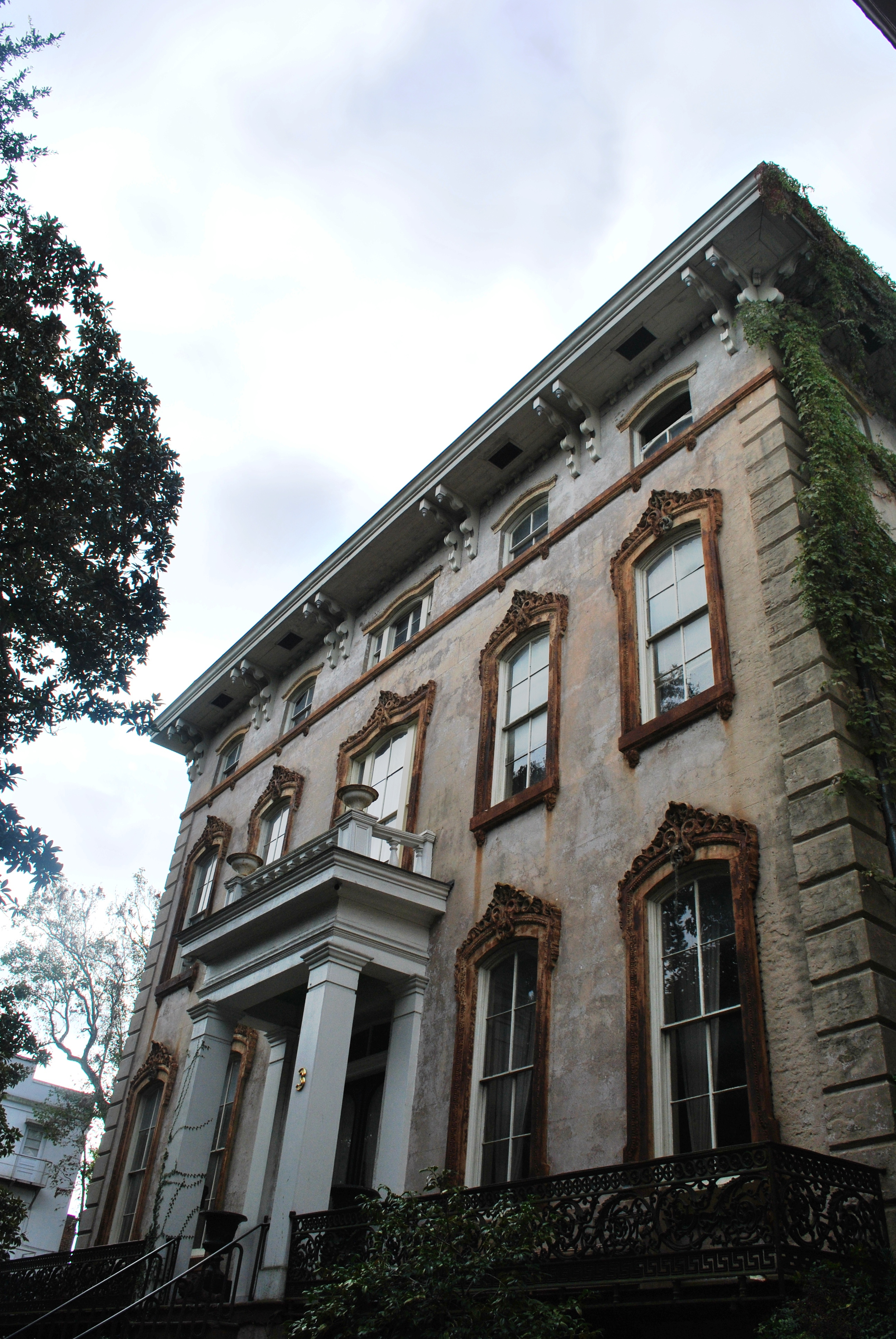
Noble Hardee Mansion, 3 West Gordon Street at Bull Street

Below is a selection of notable buildings and structures on Gordon Street, all in Savannah's Historic District. From west to east:

West Gordon Street

- Matilda Heitman Properties, 209–213 West Gordon Street (1895)
- Thomas McArthur Duplex, 205–207 West Gordon Street (1853)
- Gordon Row, 101–129 West Gordon Street (1854)
- Joachim Saussy House, 23 West Gordon Street (1870)
- John M. Williams Duplex, 17–19 West Gordon Street (1879–1882)
- Charles B. King House, 11 West Gordon Street (1858)
- Mohr Brothers Duplex, 7–9 West Gordon Street (1884)
- Noble Hardee Mansion, 3 West Gordon Street (1860)

East Gordon Street

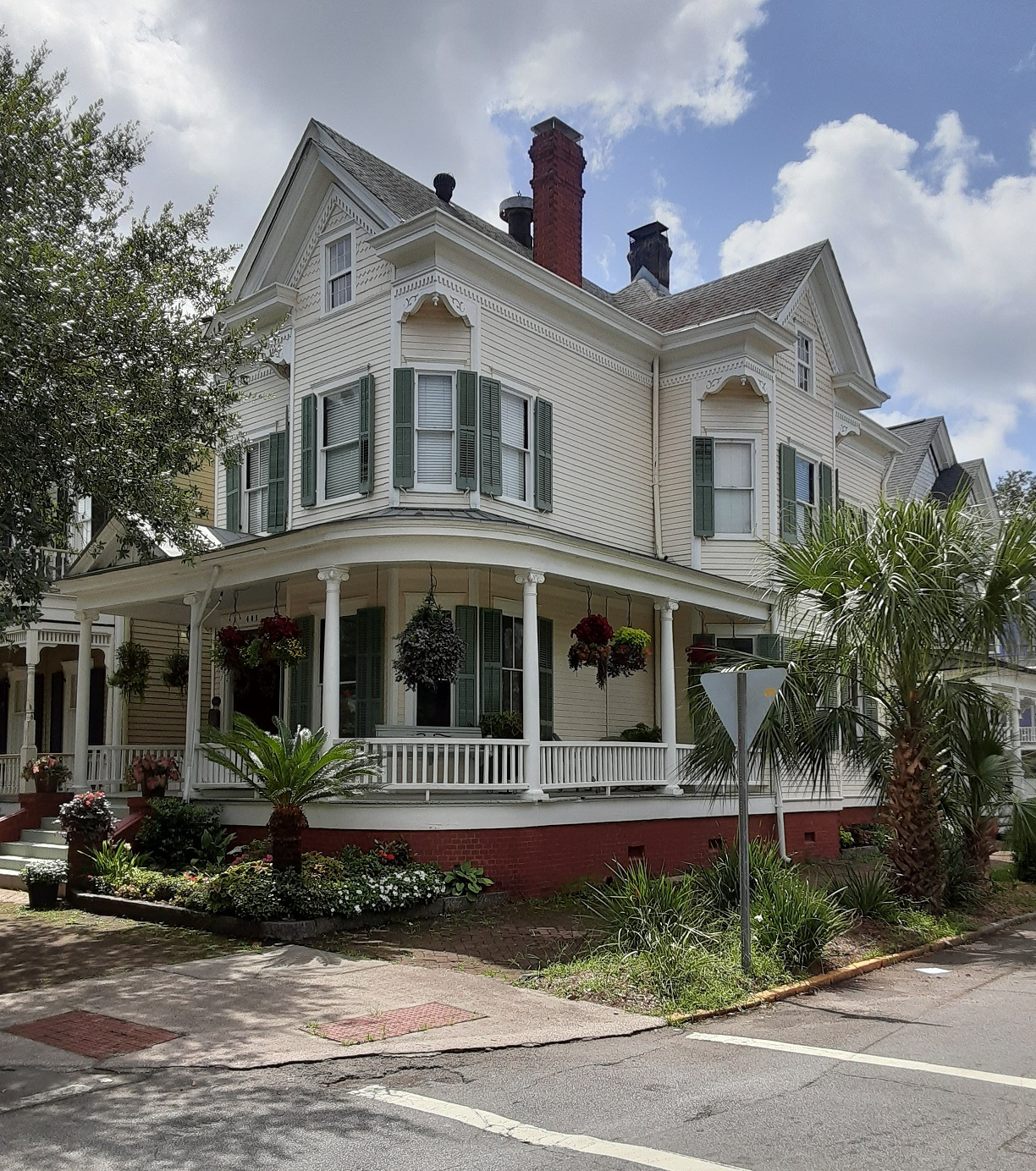
Sarah Sexton Property, 401 East Gordon Street

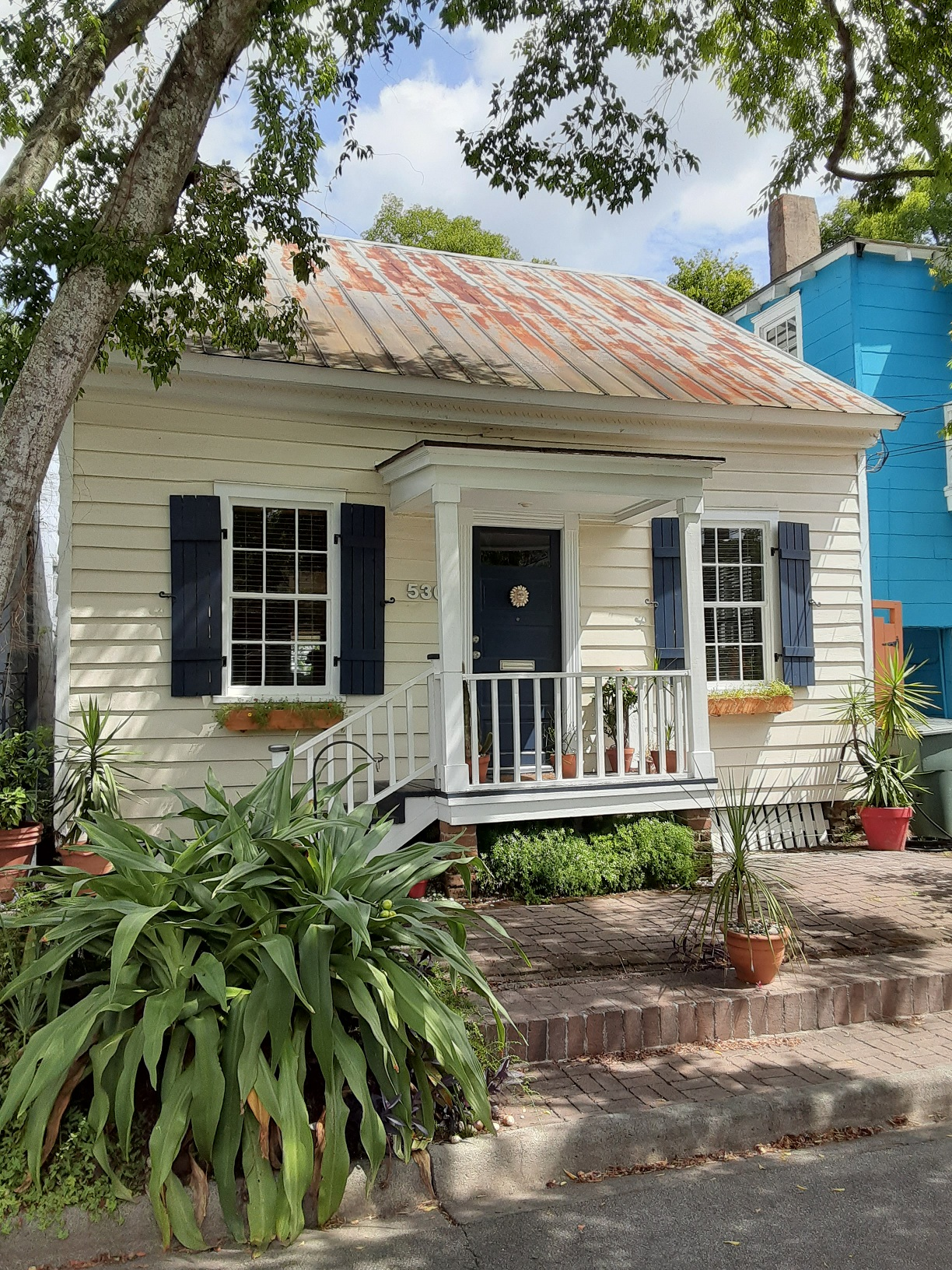
Dennis Shea Cottage, 530 East Gordon Street

- Scudder's Row, 1–9 East Gordon Street (1852–1853)
- Charles B. King House, 11 East Gordon Street (1854)
- Charles McGill House, 15 East Gordon Street (1854)
- John Rowland House, 17–19 East Gordon Street (1881)
- Congregation Mickve Israel, 20 East Gordon Street (1876)
- Frederick Groschaud House, 23 East Gordon Street (1854)
- Charles Hutchins House, 113 East Gordon Street (1868)
- Adolphus Gomm House, 115 East Gordon Street (1869)
- John B. Berry House, 127 East Gordon Street (1856)
- Massie Common School House, 201–213 East Gordon Street (1855–1856)
- John Guerrard Row House, 215–229 East Gordon Street (1872)
- Edward Purse Duplex, 220–222 East Gordon Street (1856)
- 224 East Gordon Street (1856) – former home of preservationist Jane Adair Wright
- 233 East Gordon Street (1923)
- Flora Max House, 235 East Gordon Street (1894)
- Thomas Davis House, 237 East Gordon Street (1893)
- Beth Eden Baptist Church, 302 East Gordon Street (1893)
- John Schwarz Duplex, 307–309 East Gordon Street (1861)
- Henry Hermann House, 313 East Gordon Street (1861)
- Sarah Sexton Property (I), 401 East Gordon Street (1901)
- Sarah Sexton Property (II), 403 East Gordon Street (1901)
- Emma Hunter House, 405 East Gordon Street (1895)
- 407 East Gordon Street (1890)
- 409 East Gordon Street (1890)
- Abraham Samuels Row House, 414–420 East Gordon Street (1888)
- 415–419 East Gordon Street (1886)
- Frank Mirault Property, 508 East Gordon Street (1883)
- Michael Cahill House, 518 East Gordon Street (1886)
- Thomas Corcoran House, 522 East Gordon Street (1884)
- 527–537 East Gordon Street (1868)
- Dennis Shea Cottage, 530 East Gordon Street (1867)
- Harriet Gardner House, 540 East Gordon Street (1884)
- James Ferris Cann Property, 543–545 East Gordon Street (1894)
- St. Benedict the Moor school building, 554 East Gordon Street (1910)
- St. Benedict the Moor rectory building, 556 East Gordon Street (1910)
