= Noble Hardee Mansion =

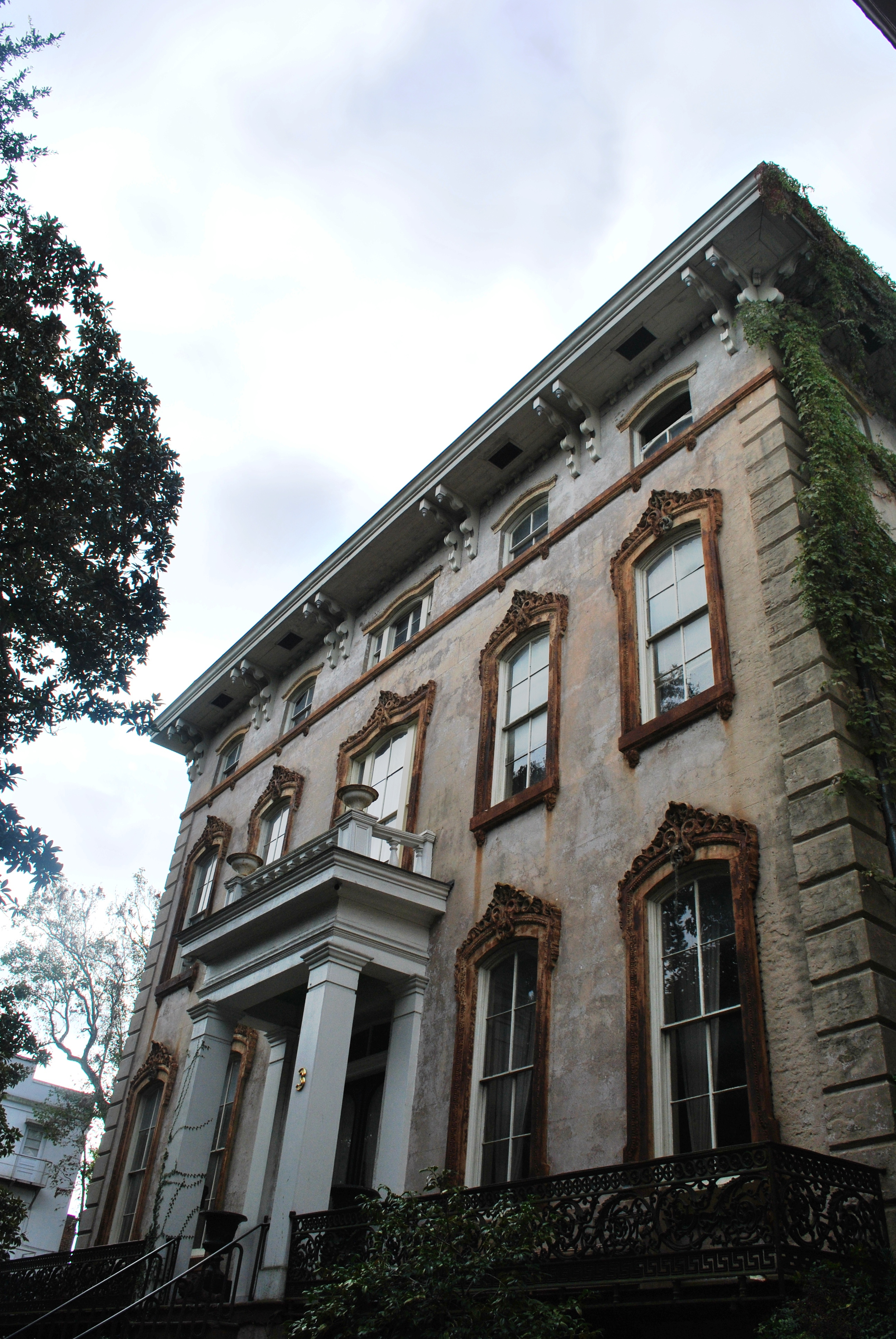
- The building in 2013
- Interactive map of the Noble Hardee Mansion area

General information
- Location: Savannah, Georgia, U.S., 3 West Gordon Street
- Coordinates: 32.0709022°N 81.09518°W
- Completed: 1860 (166 years ago)

Technical details
- Floor count: 3.5

The Noble Hardee Mansion is a historic building in Savannah, Georgia, United States. It is located at 3 West Gordon Street, in the southwestern residential block of Monterey Square, and was built in 1860. It is part of the Savannah Historic District. The home, consisting of 3.5 storeys and containing fifteen fireplaces, was built for Noble Andrew Hardee, a cotton factor and owner of N. A. Hardee Company. He died seven years after the building's construction. From the late 1990s until around 2022, the building was occupied by Alex Raskin Antiques and later sold that year in a private sale to an unknown real estate developer, “HP”. The entrance to the store was at 441 Bull Street, on the building's eastern side.

The building was restored in the late 19th century, with additions made over the years removed.

In the 1940s, it formed part of Armstrong Junior College.

21st United States president Chester A. Arthur visited his relative Henry Triplett Botts at the mansion.

The building was featured in the 1995 movie Something to Talk About, utilized by Julia Roberts as a surreptitous meeting place.

Ralston College purchased the property in 2022. In January 2025, the college sold the property to another party, allegedly violating a preservation easement placed on the property in 1967 by the Historic Savannah Foundation. The Foundation is understood to have had a right to first refusal on the property's sale.

== Architectural detail ==
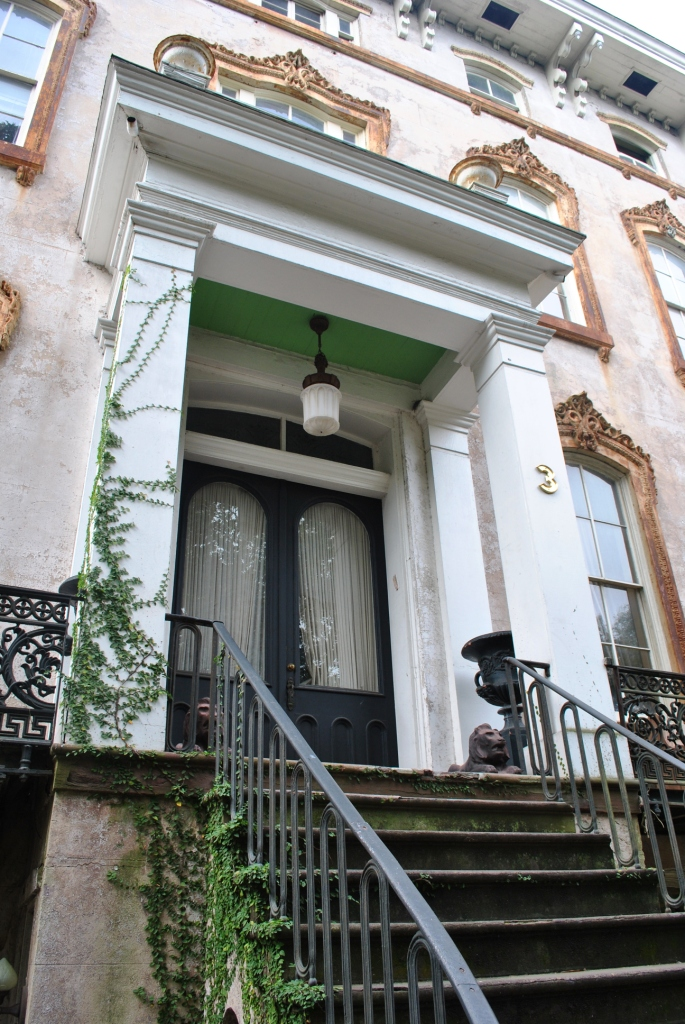
Main entrance

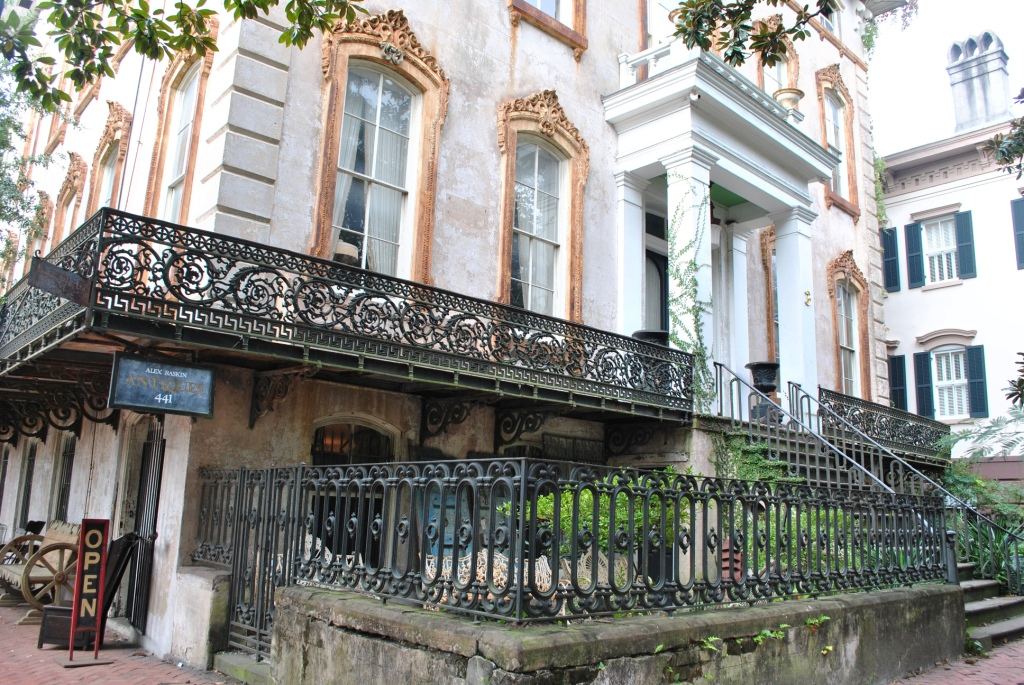
First floor at the corner of Bull Street

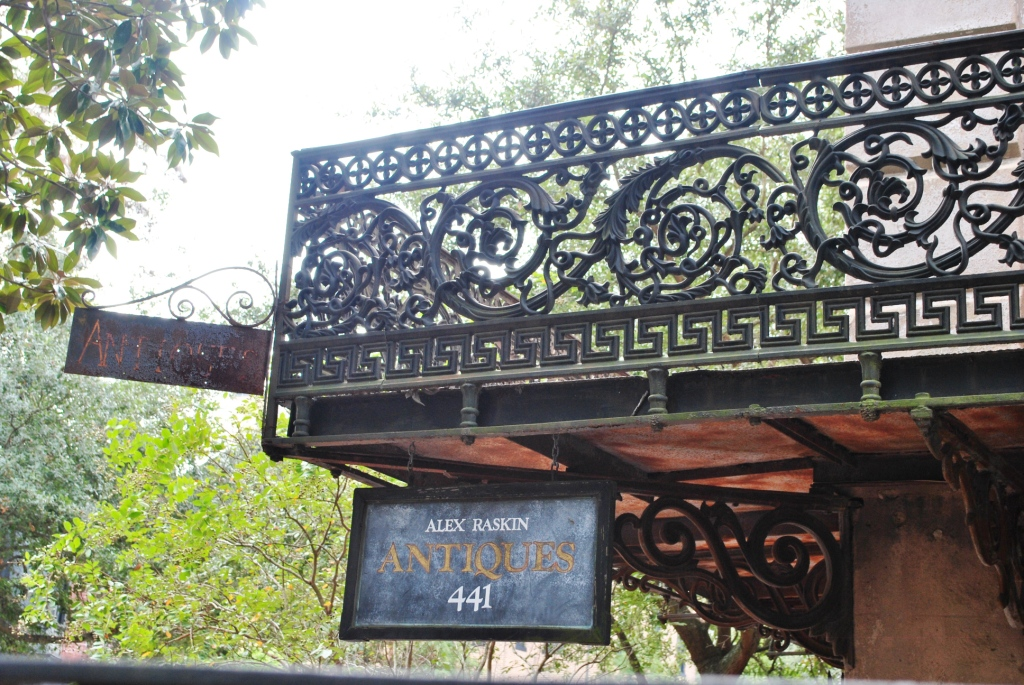
Latticework

== See also ==
- Buildings in Savannah Historic District
