= Quantock Row (Chatham Square) =

Historic row house in Savannah, Georgia, United States

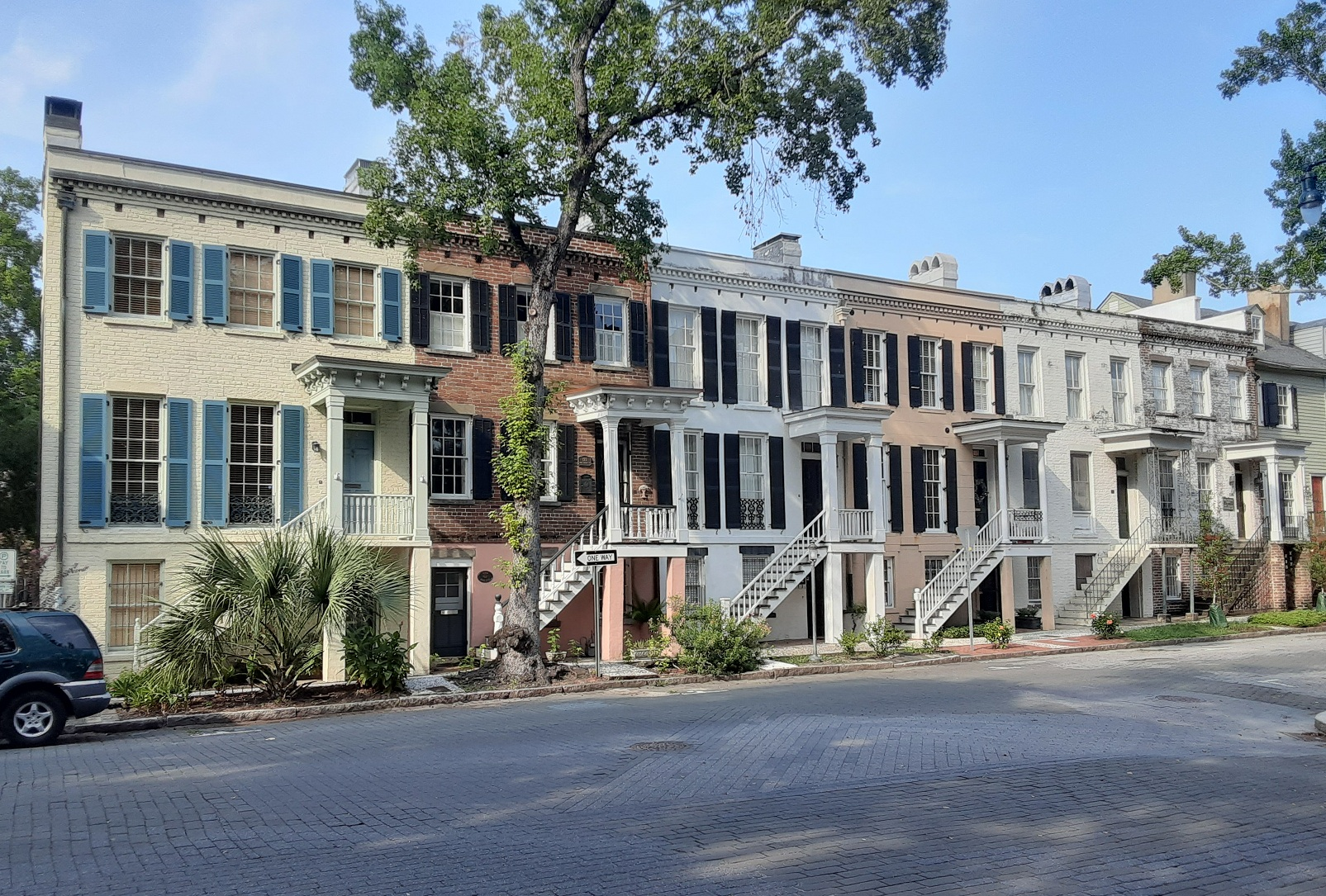
- Quantock Row in 2021, with number 124 on the left
- Interactive map of the Quantock Row area

General information
- Location: Chatham Square, Savannah, Georgia, U.S., 114–124 West Taylor Street
- Coordinates: 32.0722°N 81.096397°W
- Completed: 1852 (174 years ago)

Technical details
- Floor count: 3

Quantock Row is a historic row house in Savannah, Georgia, United States. It comprises the six homes from 114 to 124 West Taylor Street, in the northeastern residential block of Chatham Square, and was completed in 1852. It is a contributing property of the Savannah Historic District, itself on the National Register of Historic Places. The row partly fills the block between Barnard Street to the west and Whitaker Street to the east and sits directly opposite Gordon Row.

The properties were built for Allen William Quantock.

Other similar-style row houses exist in Savannah's Scudder's Row, Gordon Row, the Jones Street Quantock Row, William Remshart Row House, McDonough Row and Mary Marshall Row.

== Gallery ==
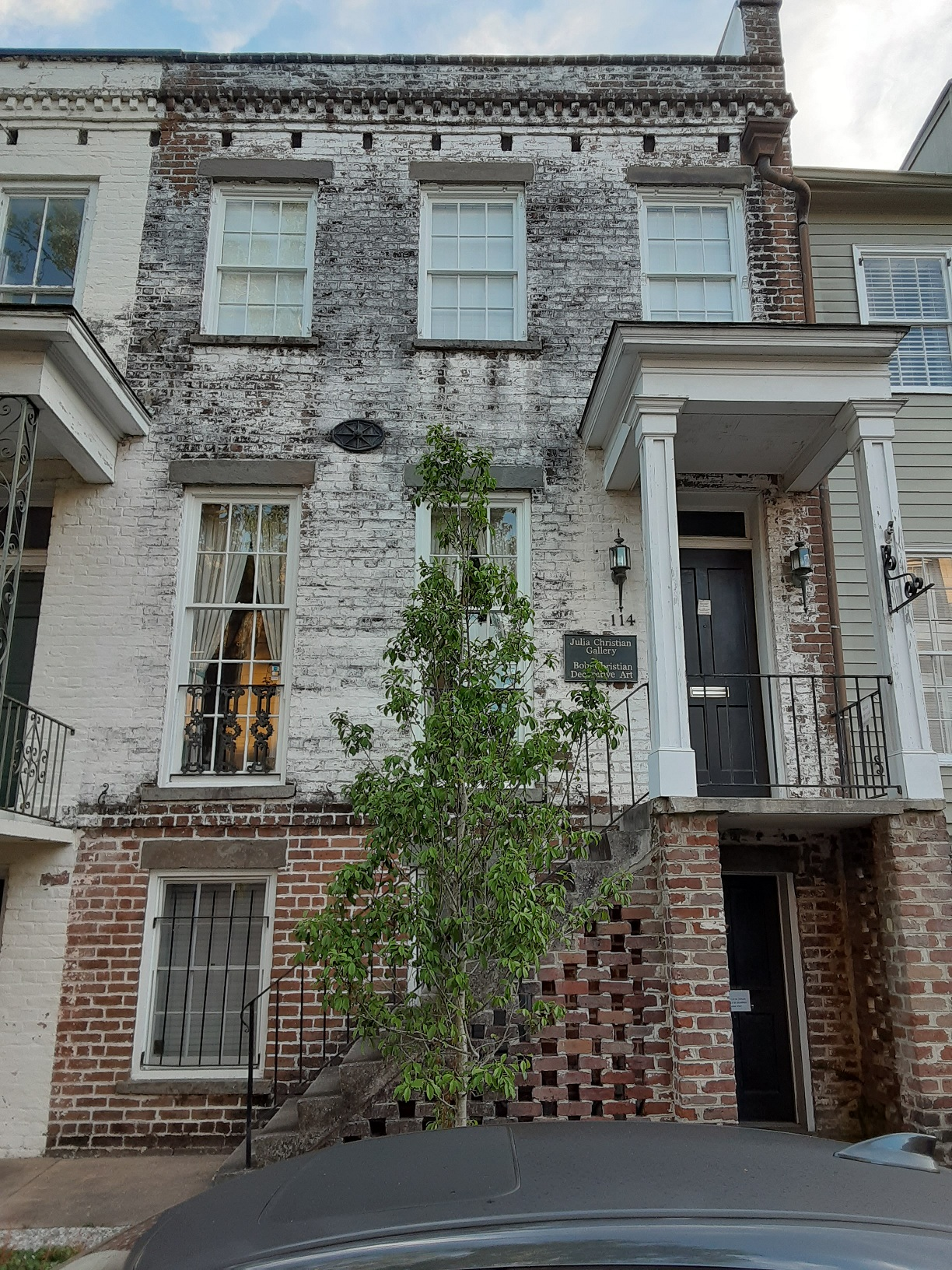
114 West Taylor Street

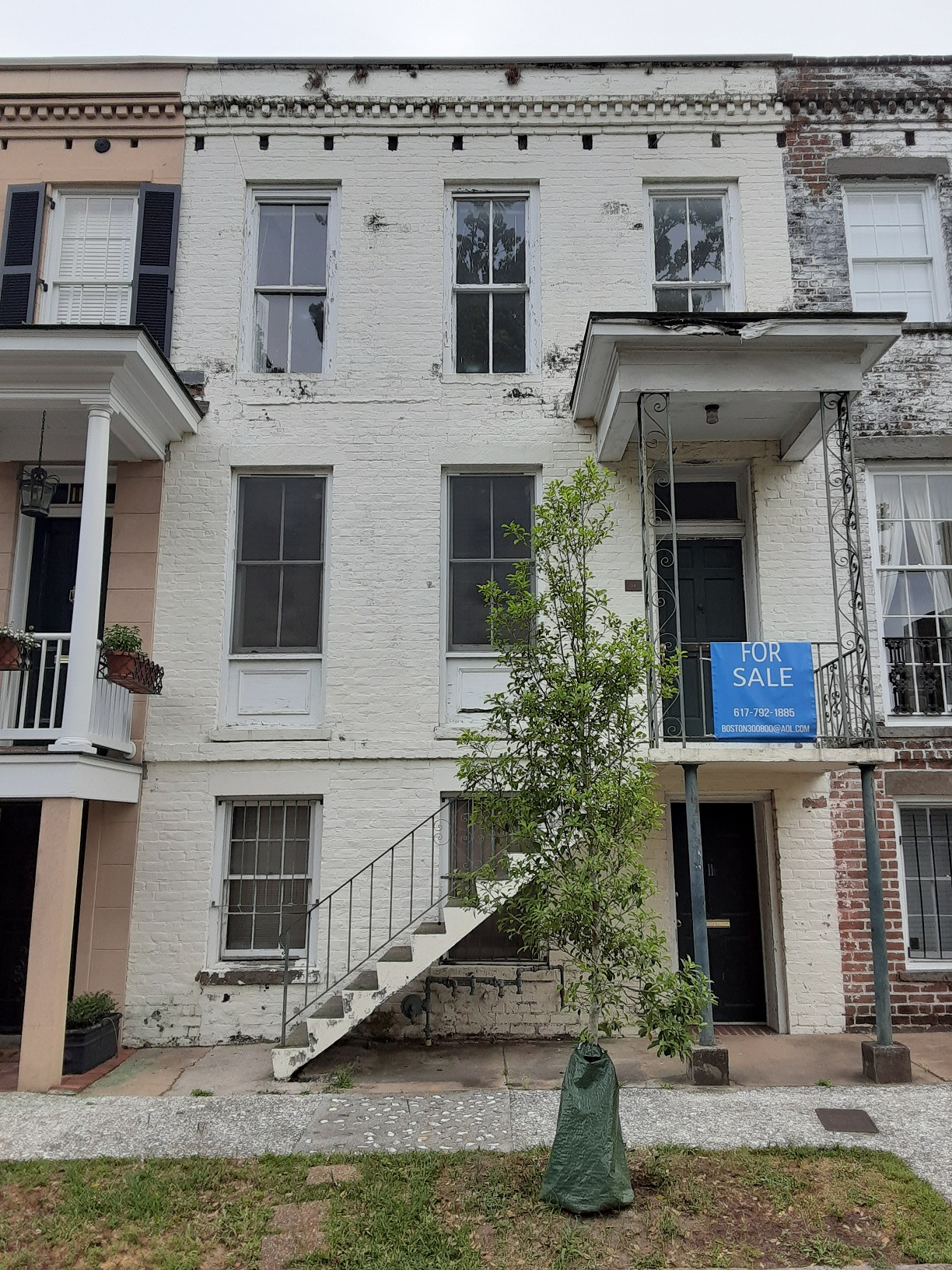
116 West Taylor Street

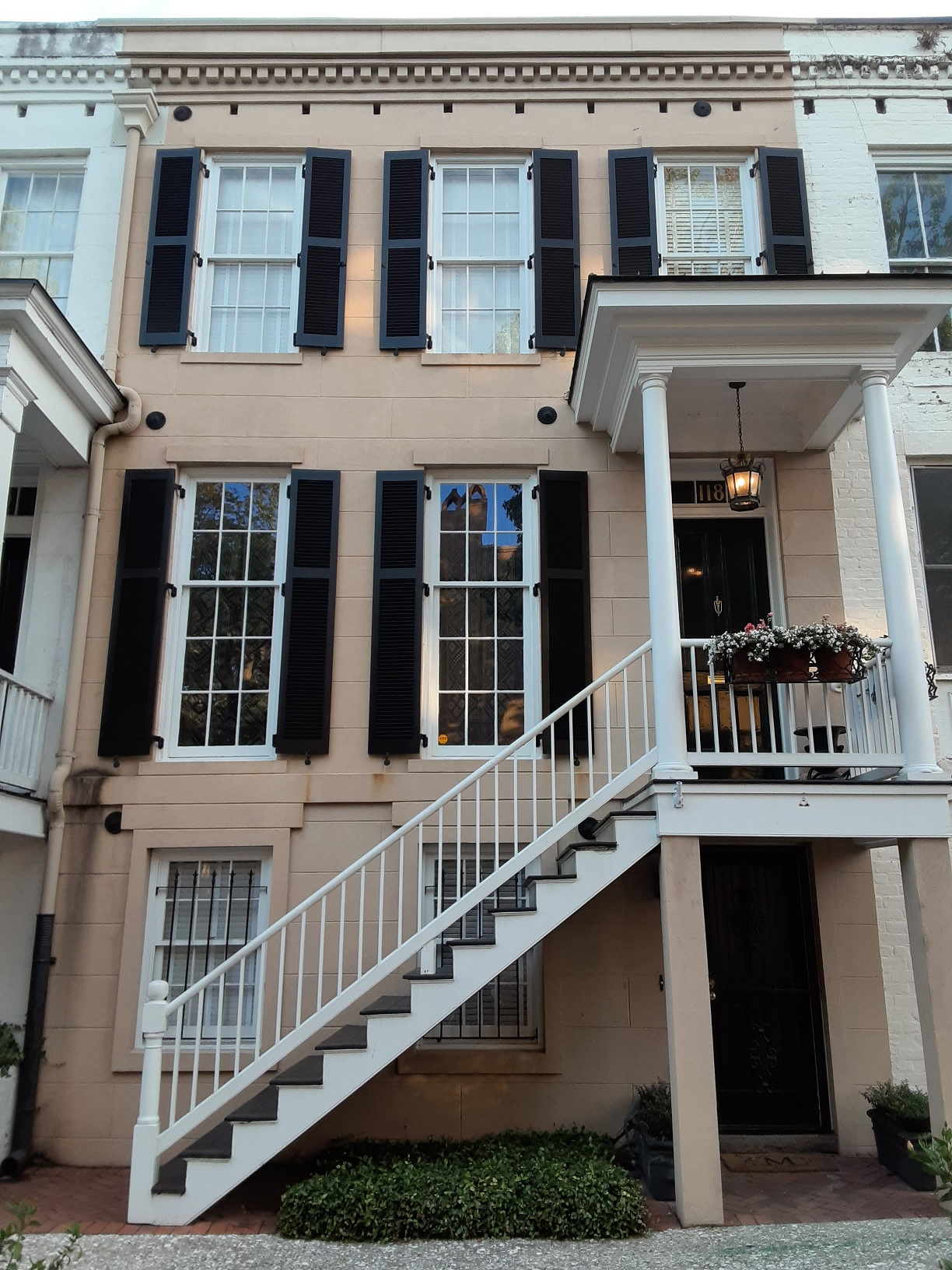
118 West Taylor Street

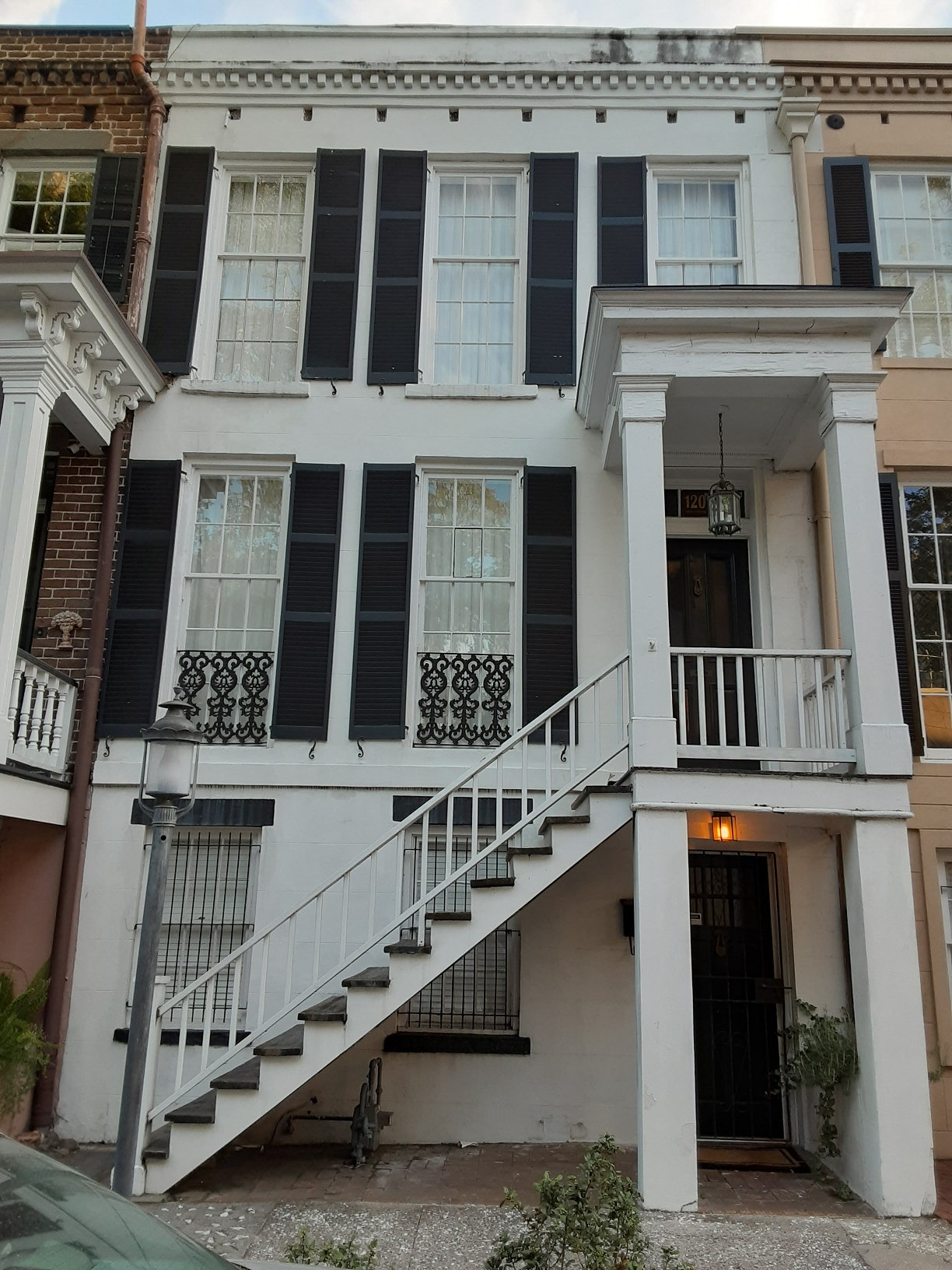
120 West Taylor Street

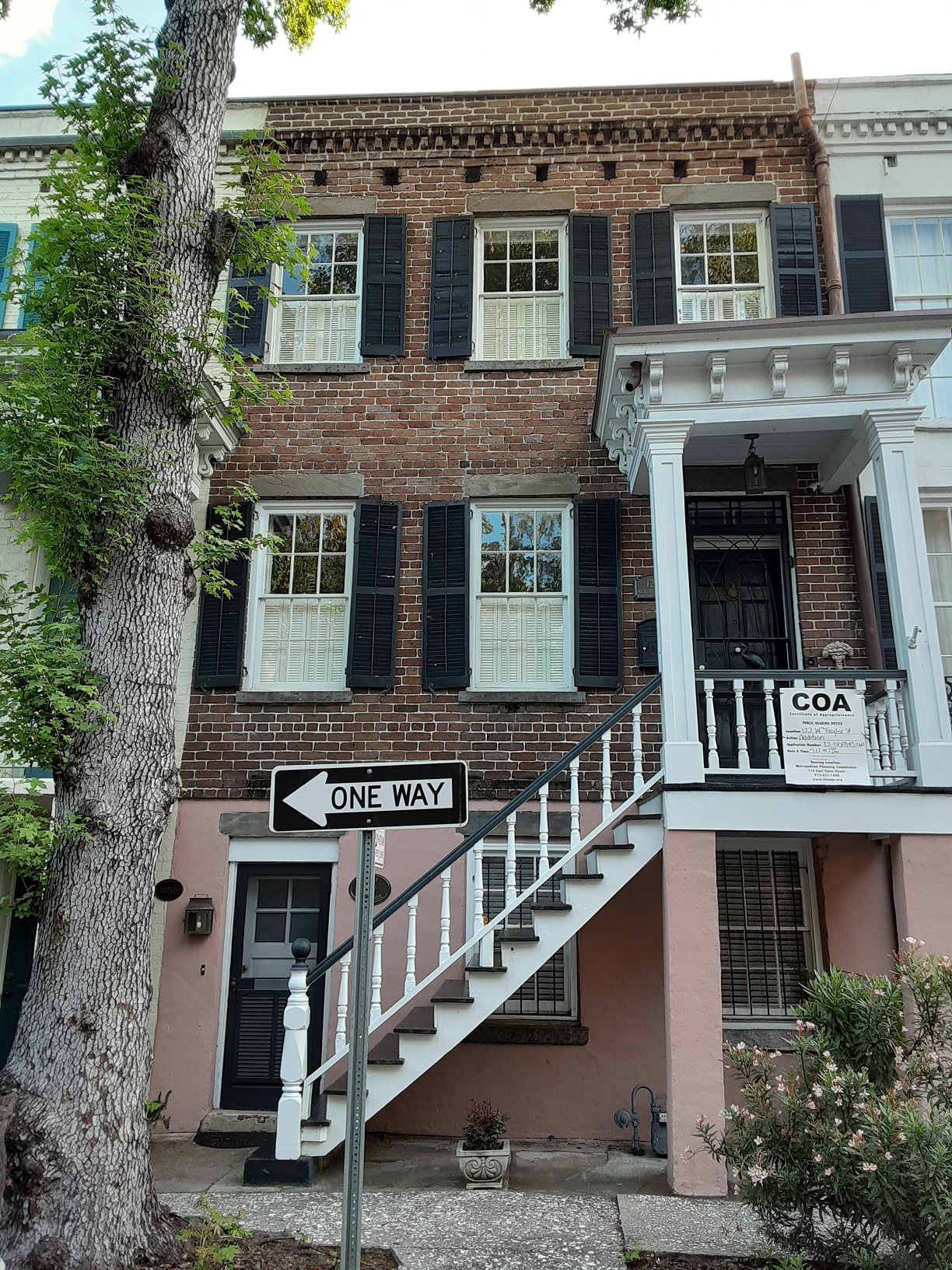
122 West Taylor Street

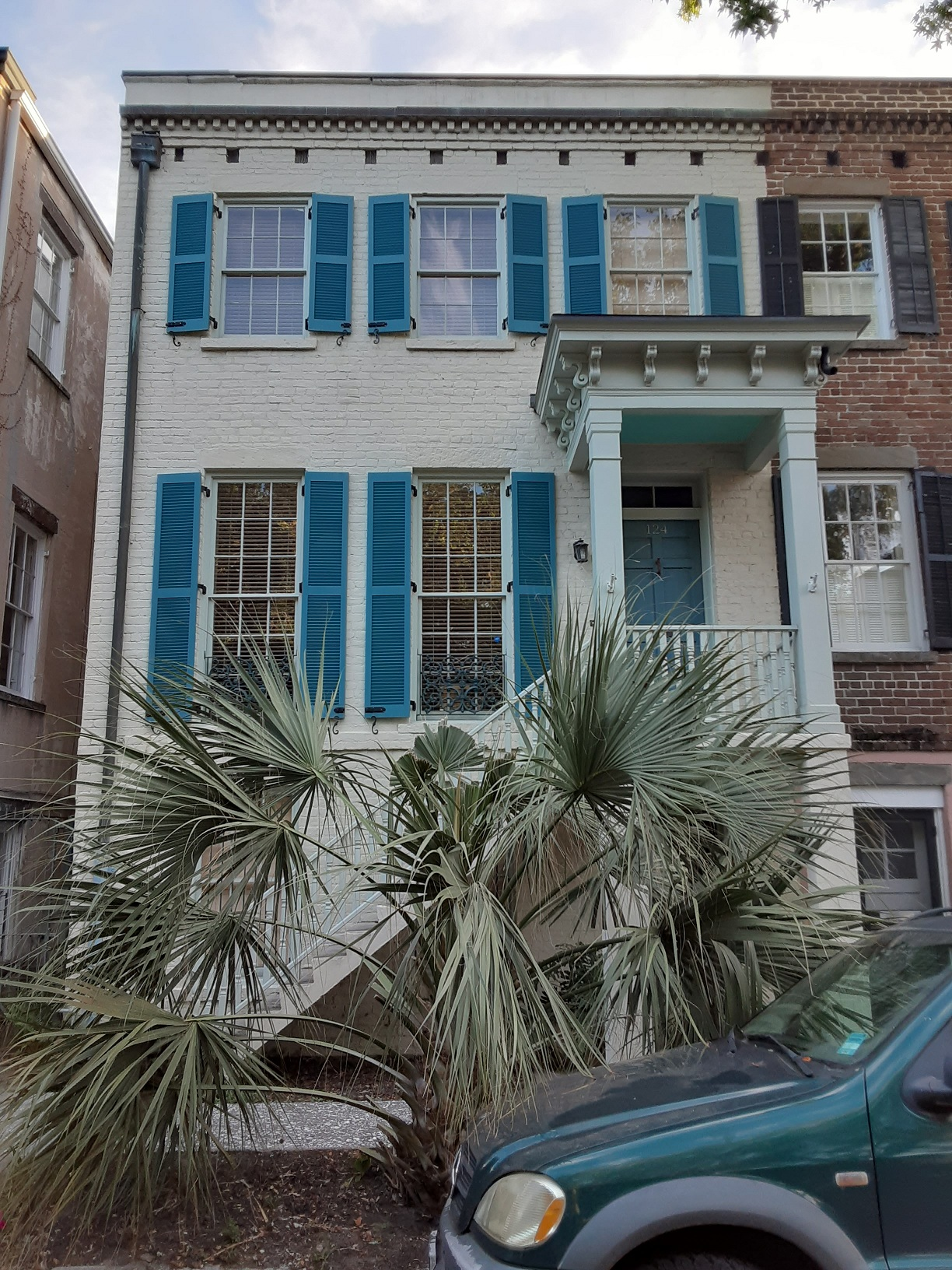
124 West Taylor Street

== See also ==
- Buildings in Savannah Historic District
