= Taylor Street =

Prominent street in Savannah, Georgia

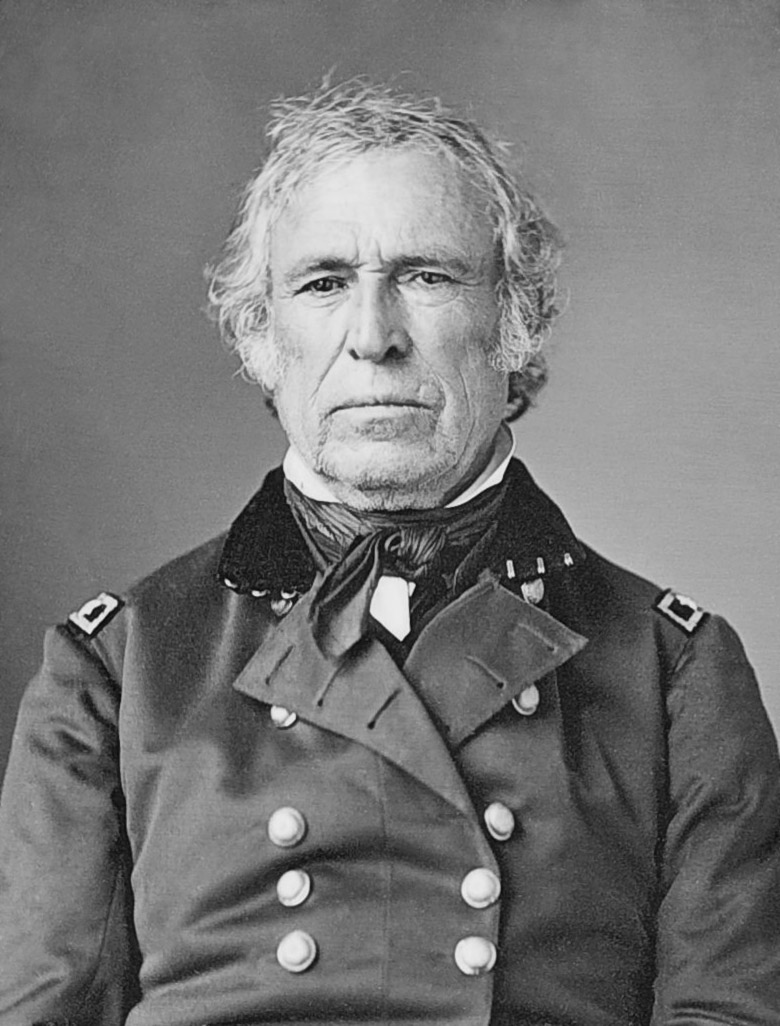
- Zachary Taylor, the 12th president of the United States, for whom the street is named
- Namesake: Zachary Taylor
- Length: 0.76 mi (1.22 km)
- Location: Savannah, Georgia, U.S.
- West end: Martin Luther King Jr. Boulevard
- East end: East Broad Street

Taylor Street is a prominent street in Savannah, Georgia. Located in its downtown section between Jones Street to the north and Gordon Street to the south, it runs for about 0.76 miles (1.22 km) from Martin Luther King Jr. Boulevard in the west to East Broad Street in the east.

The street is named for general Zachary Taylor, a hero of the Mexican–American War. (Nearby Taylor Square is named for Susie King Taylor, not Zachary.) The street is entirely within Savannah Historic District, a National Historic Landmark District.

Taylor Street passes through four squares on their northern side. From west to east:

- Chatham Square
- Monterey Square
- Taylor Square
- Whitefield Square

== Notable buildings and structures ==
Below is a selection of notable buildings and structures on State Street, all in Savannah's Historic District. From west to east:

West Taylor Street

- Benjamin & Mary Ferrell Tenement Row, 215–219 West Taylor Street (1852)
- The Barnard Street School, 212 West Taylor Street (1901)
- Edward Lovell Duplex, 126–128 West Taylor Street (1856)
- Quantock Row, 114–124 West Taylor Street (1852)
- Enoch Hendry Row House, 108–112 West Taylor Street (1851)
- Meinhardt Row, 101–107 West Taylor Street (1871)
- Herman Kuhlman Duplex, 22–24 West Taylor Street (1851)
- George Gray House, 20 West Taylor Street (1855)
- Andrew Farie House, 18 West Taylor Street (1913)
- 12 West Taylor Street (1868)
- Hurn Museum of Contemporary Folk Art, 10 West Taylor Street (1852)
- Nicholas Cruger House, 4 West Taylor Street (1852)

East Taylor Street

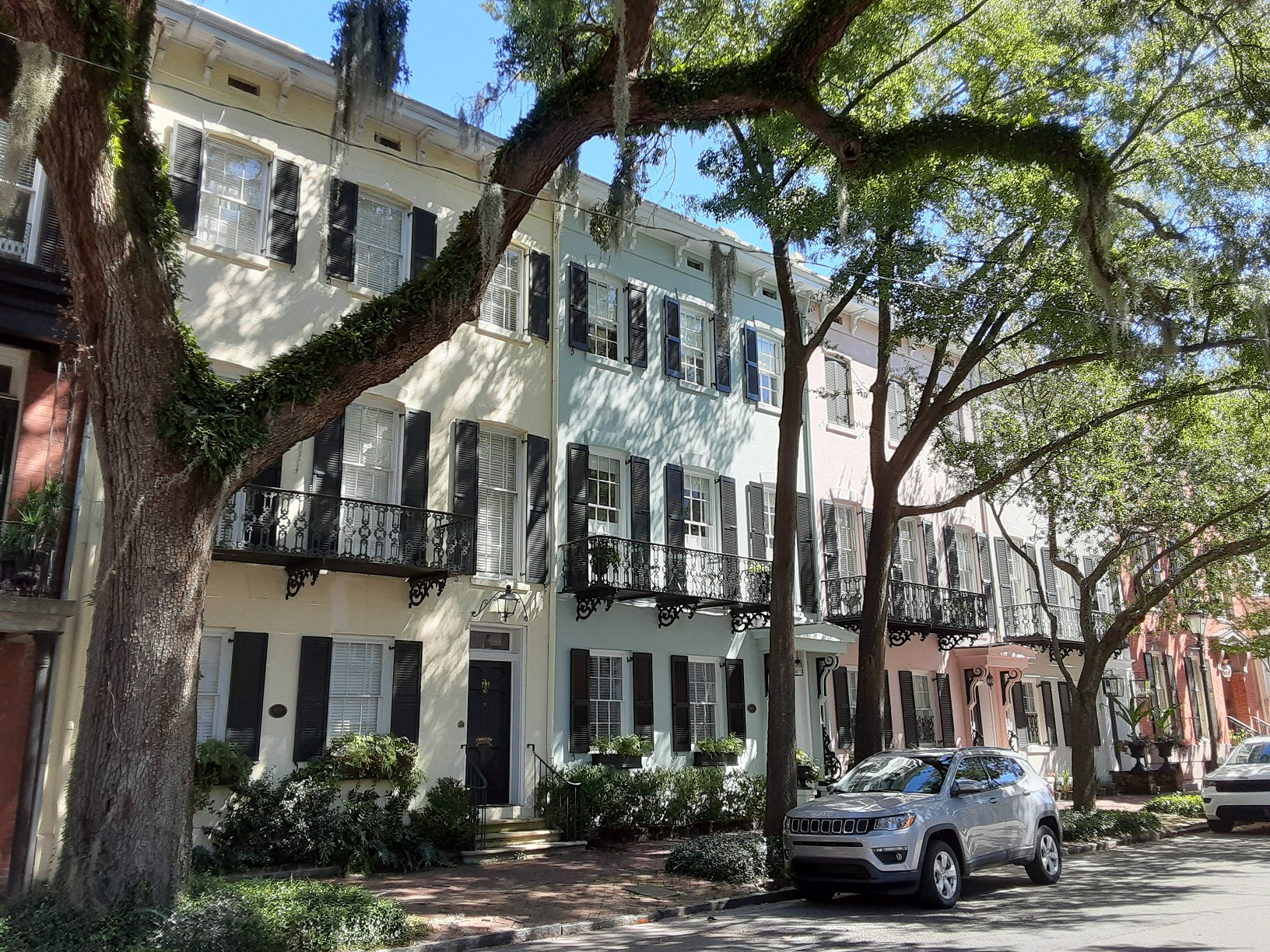
Guckenheimer Row, 108–114 East Taylor Street

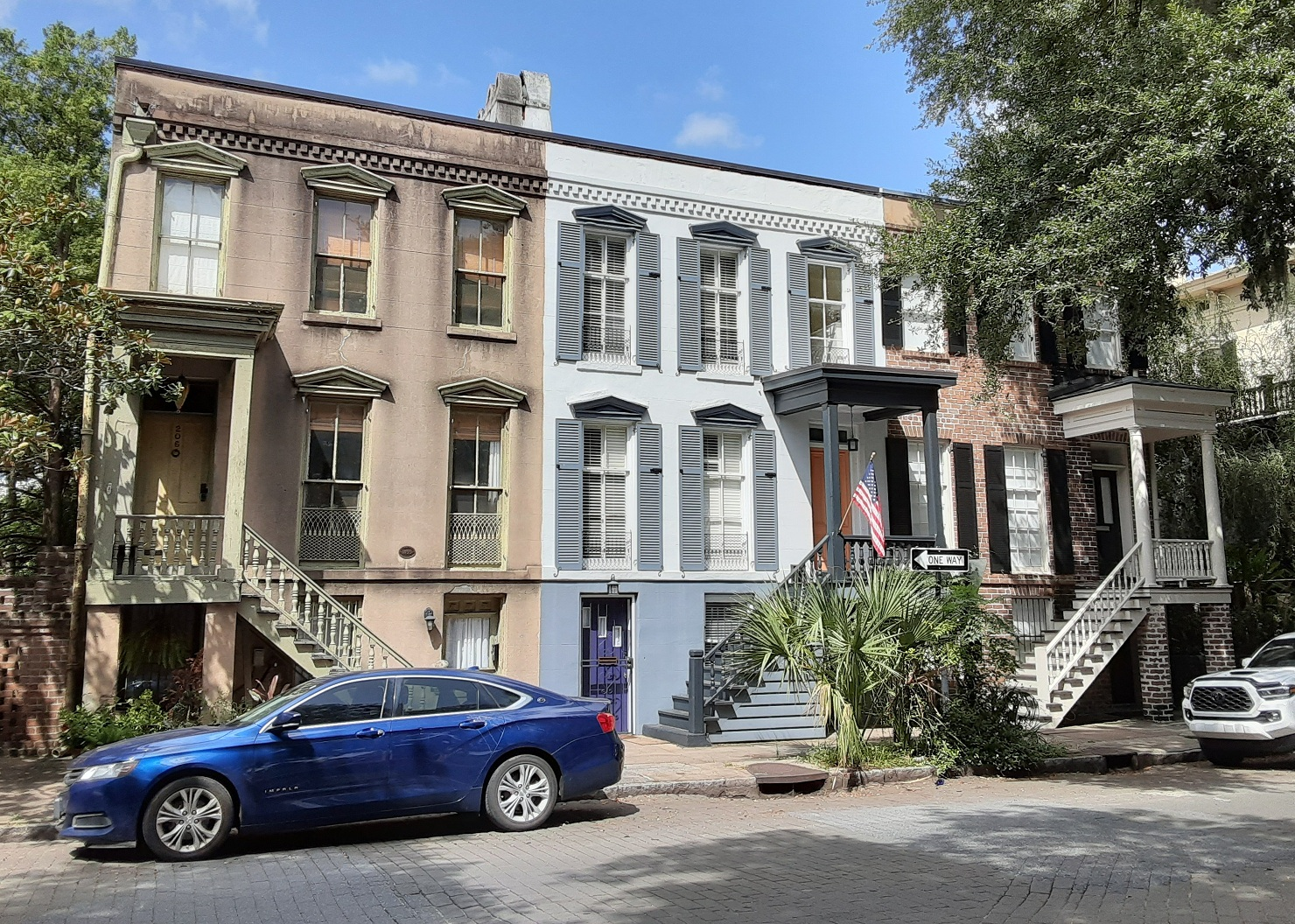
George Ash Row House, 206–210 East Taylor Street

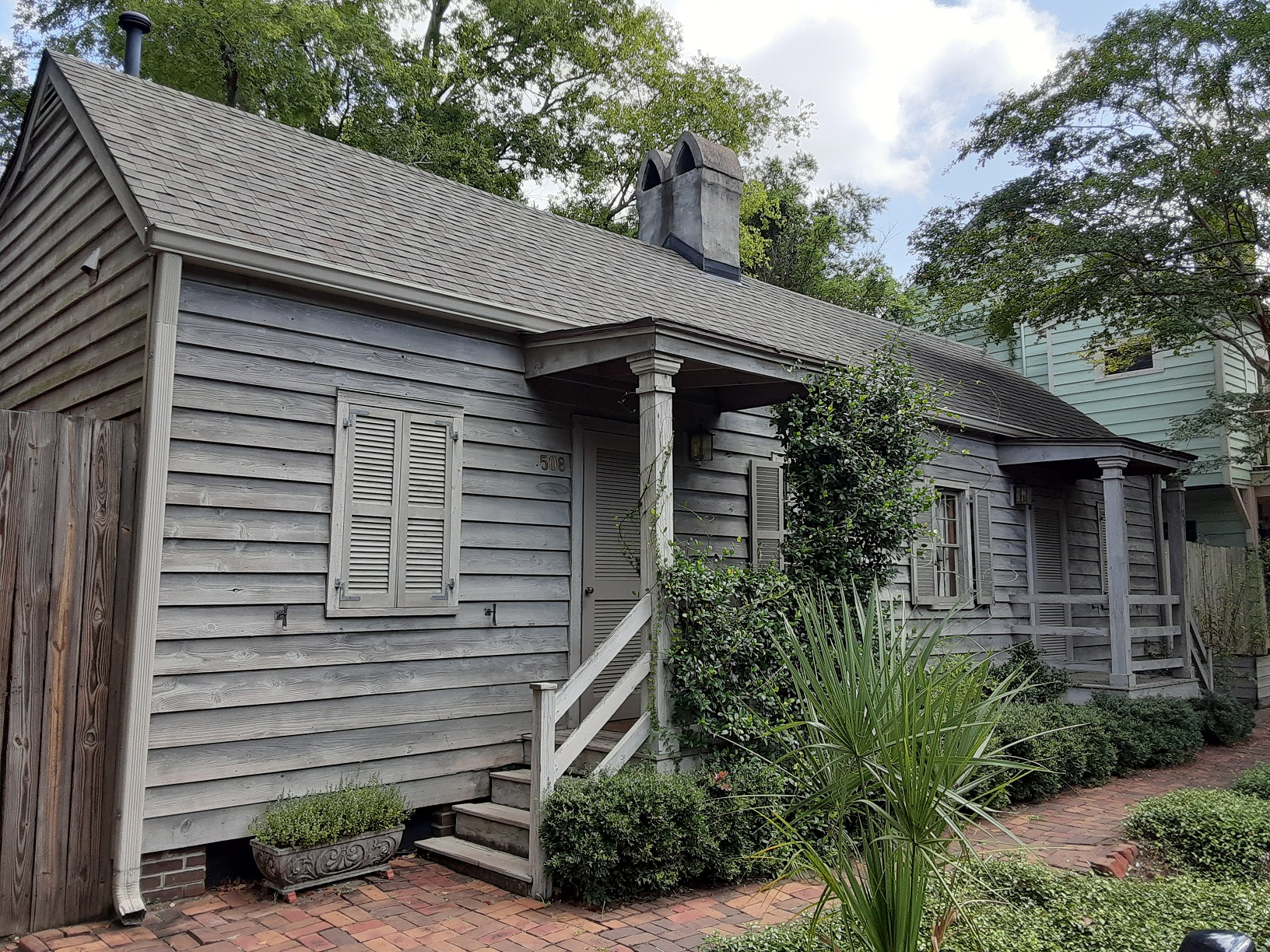
William Miller Property, 508–510 East Taylor Street

- Comer House, 2 East Taylor Street (1880)
- William Hunter House, 10 East Taylor Street (1872)
- Thomas–Levy House (part of the Thomas–Purse Duplex), 12 East Taylor Street (1869/1894)
- Daniel Purse House (part of the Thomas–Purse Duplex), 14 East Taylor Street (1869)
- David Lopez Cohen Property (I), 16–20 East Taylor Street (1852)
- David Lopez Cohen Property (II), 24 East Taylor Street (1852)
- David Lopez Cohen Property (III), 28–32 East Taylor Street (1852)
- Alexander Bennett House, 102 East Taylor Street (1853)
- John Kuck House, 106 East Taylor Street (1906)
- Guckenheimer Row, 108–114 East Taylor Street (1873)
- Adam Short Property, 118–120 East Taylor Street (1853)
- Mary Demere (Estate of) House, 126 East Taylor Street (1872)
- Mary Demere House, 128 East Taylor Street (1860)
- William Rogers House, 202 East Taylor Street (1859)
- George Ash Row House (I), 206–210 East Taylor Street (1855)
- Andrew Hanley House, 214 East Taylor Street (1883)
- George Ash & Francis Grimball Duplex, 216–218 East Taylor Street (1854)
- George Ash Row House (II), 220–224 East Taylor Street (1868)
- John McCluskey House, 408 East Taylor Street (1891)
- 415–419 East Taylor Street (1888)
- Sarah Pierce Property, 502–506 East Taylor Street (1859/1891)
- William Miller Property, 508–510 East Taylor Street (1860)
- Robert Mason & Anthony Desverney Duplex, 540–542 East Taylor Street (1872)
- 554 East Taylor Street (419–421 East Broad Street) (1893)
