= Chatham Square (Savannah, Georgia) =

Public square in Savannah, Georgia, US

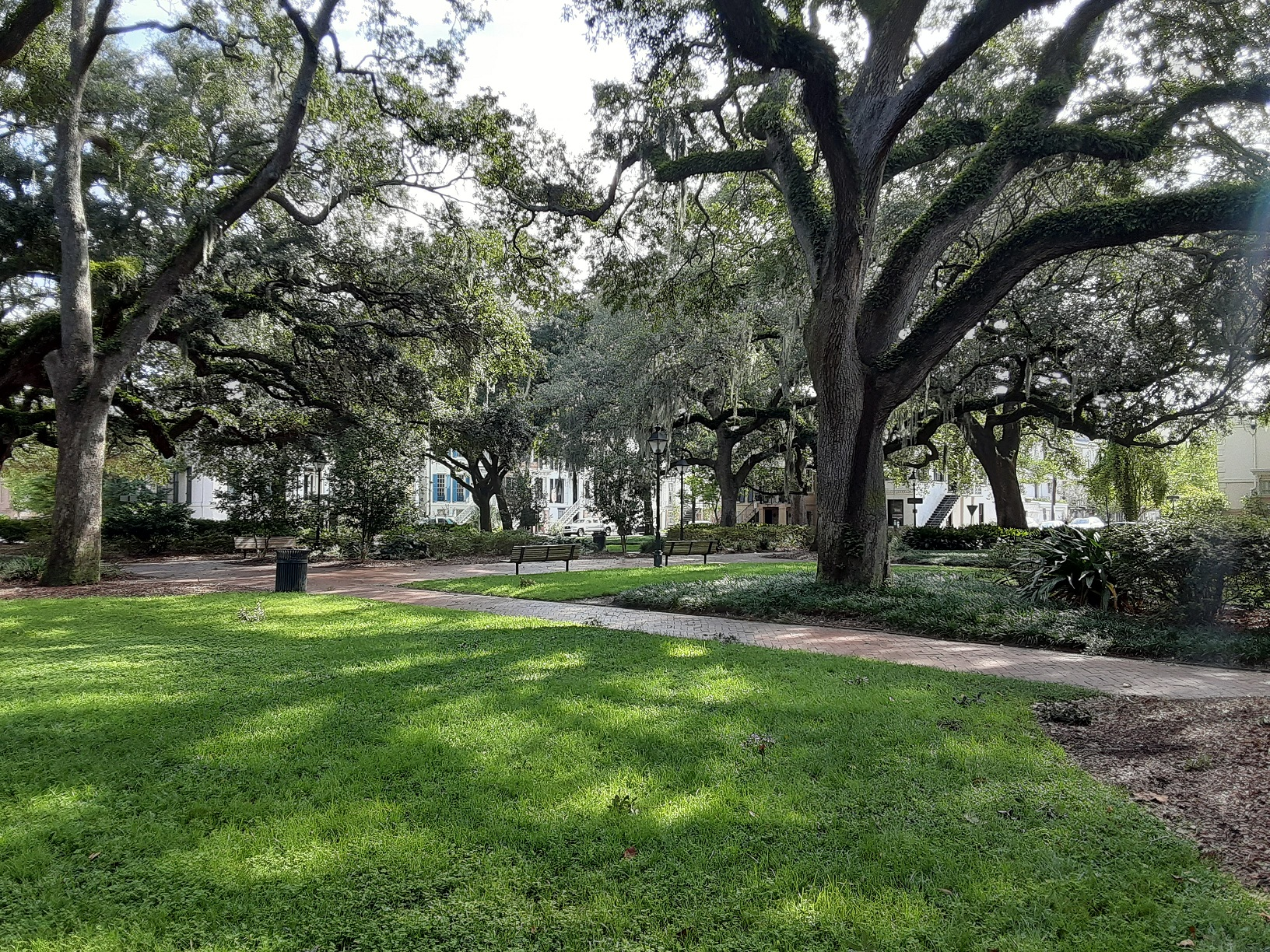
- Chatham Square, viewed from its southwestern corner
- Interactive map of Chatham Square
- Namesake: William Pitt, 1st Earl of Chatham
- Maintained by: City of Savannah
- Location: Savannah, Georgia, U.S.
- Coordinates: 32.0720°N 81.0970°W
- North: Barnard Street
- East: West Wayne Street
- South: Barnard Street
- West: West Wayne Street

Construction
- Completion: 1847 (179 years ago)

Chatham Square is one of the 22 squares of Savannah, Georgia, United States. It is located in the southernmost row of the city's five rows of squares, on Barnard Street and West Wayne Street, and was laid out in 1847. It is south of Pulaski Square and west of Monterey Square in the southwestern corner of the city's grid of squares. The square is named for William Pitt, 1st Earl of Chatham. Although Pitt never visited Savannah, he was an early supporter of the Georgia colony, and both Chatham Square and Chatham County are named in his honor. The oldest building on the square is the Enoch Hendry Row House, at 108–112 West Taylor Street, which dates to 1851.

Chatham Square is sometimes known locally as Barnard Square, in reference to the 1901-built Barnard Street School (which actually stands at 212 West Taylor Street) and has served as a building for the Savannah College of Art and Design since 1988. The college renamed it Pepe Hall.

The square contains a sundial dedicated to African-American politician Louis Burke Toomer in 1964.

== Dedication ==
Namesake	Image	Note
William Pitt, 1st Earl of Chatham		The square is named for William Pitt, 1st Earl of Chatham.

== Gordon Row ==
Gordon Row comprises the fifteen homes from 101 to 129 West Gordon Street, and was completed in 1854.

== Quantock Row ==
One of two Quantock Rows in the city, this one comprises the six homes between 114 and 124 West Taylor Street.

== Constituent buildings ==
Each building below is in one of the eight blocks around the square composed of four residential "tything" blocks and four civic ("trust") blocks, now known as the Oglethorpe Plan. They are listed with construction years where known.

Northwestern residential/tything block

- Barnard Street School, 212 West Taylor Street (1901) – now Pepe Hall

Northwestern civic/trust

- 207 West Taylor Street (1854)
- 421–423 Barnard Street (1854)
- 210 West Wayne Street (1854)

Southwestern residential/tything block

- Dasher Row, 433–441 Barnard Street (1882) – by William Chaplin, Jr.
- Thomas McArthur Duplex, 205–207 West Gordon Street (1853) – by William Chaplin, Jr.
- Matilda Heitman Properties, 209–213 West Gordon Street (1895)
- 440–442 Tattnall Street (1900)

Northeastern residential/tything block

- 414 Barnard Street (1880)
- William Kine Property, 419–425 Barnard Street (1854)
- Edward Lovell Duplex, 126–128 West Taylor Street (1856)
- Quantock Row, 114–124 West Taylor Street (1852)
- Enoch Hendry Row House, 108–112 West Taylor Street (1851) – oldest building on the square
- Frederick Kuck Property, 411–417 Whitaker Street (1899)

Northeastern civic/trust block

- William Bradley House, 424 Barnard Street (1859)
- William Bradley Commercial Property, 426 Barnard Street (1868)
- Meinhardt Row, 101–107 West Taylor Street (1871)

Southeastern civic/trust block

- 106–108 West Gordon Street (1870)

Southeastern residential/tything block

- Gordon Row, 101–129 West Gordon Street (1854) – except for number 129, these include their respective carriage houses which back onto West Gordon Lane

== Gallery ==
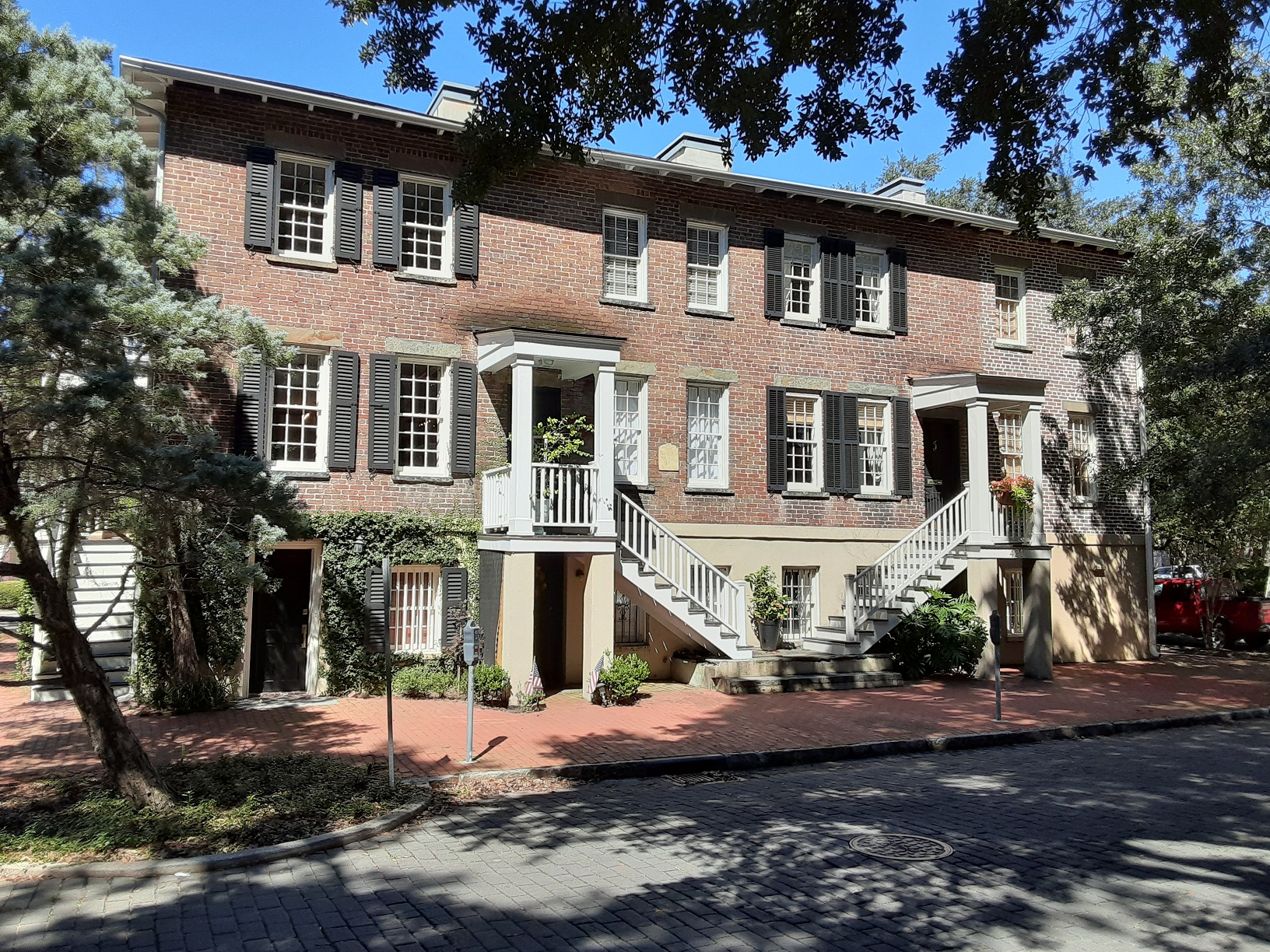
William Kine Property, 419–425 Barnard Street

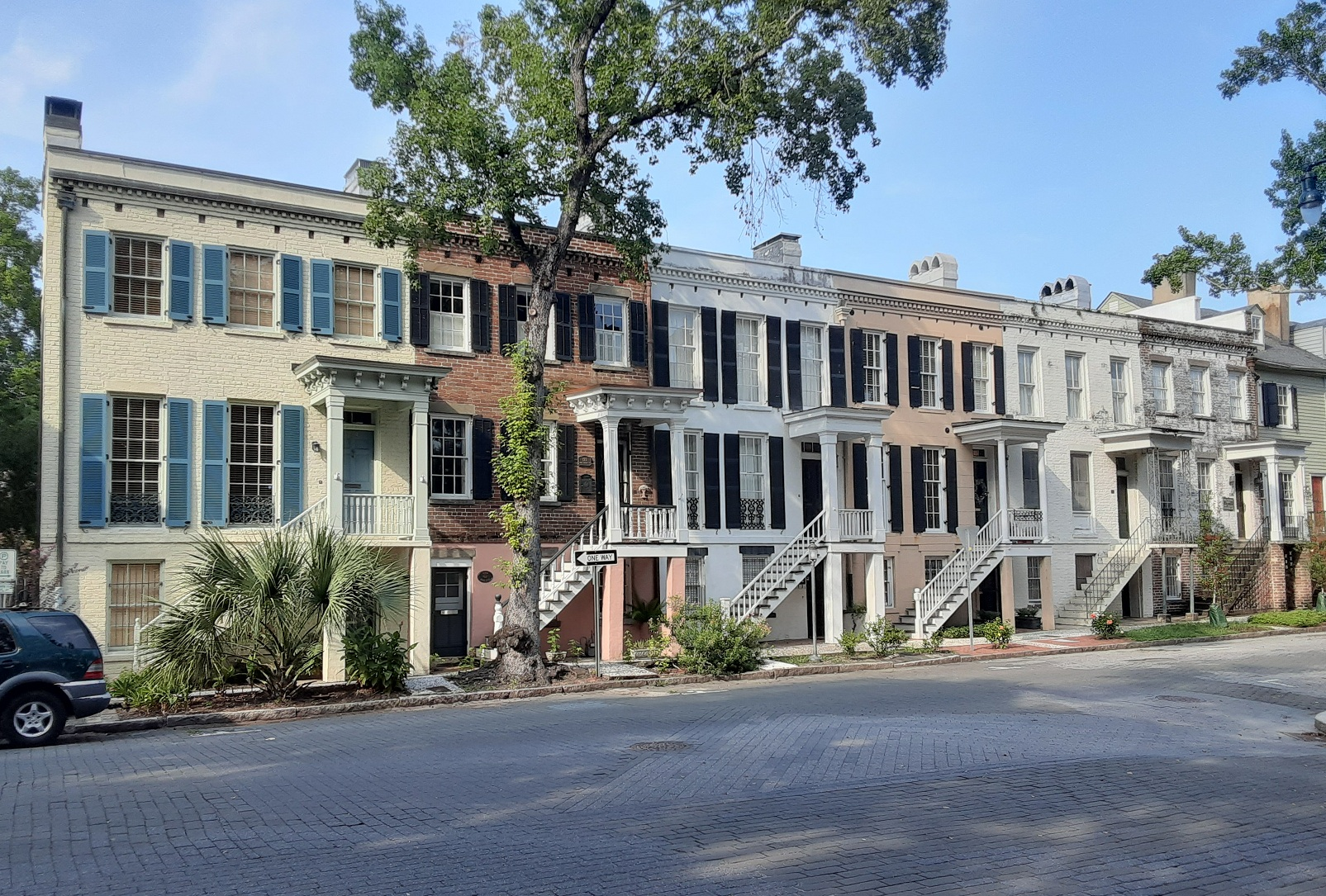
Quantock Row, 114–124 West Taylor Street

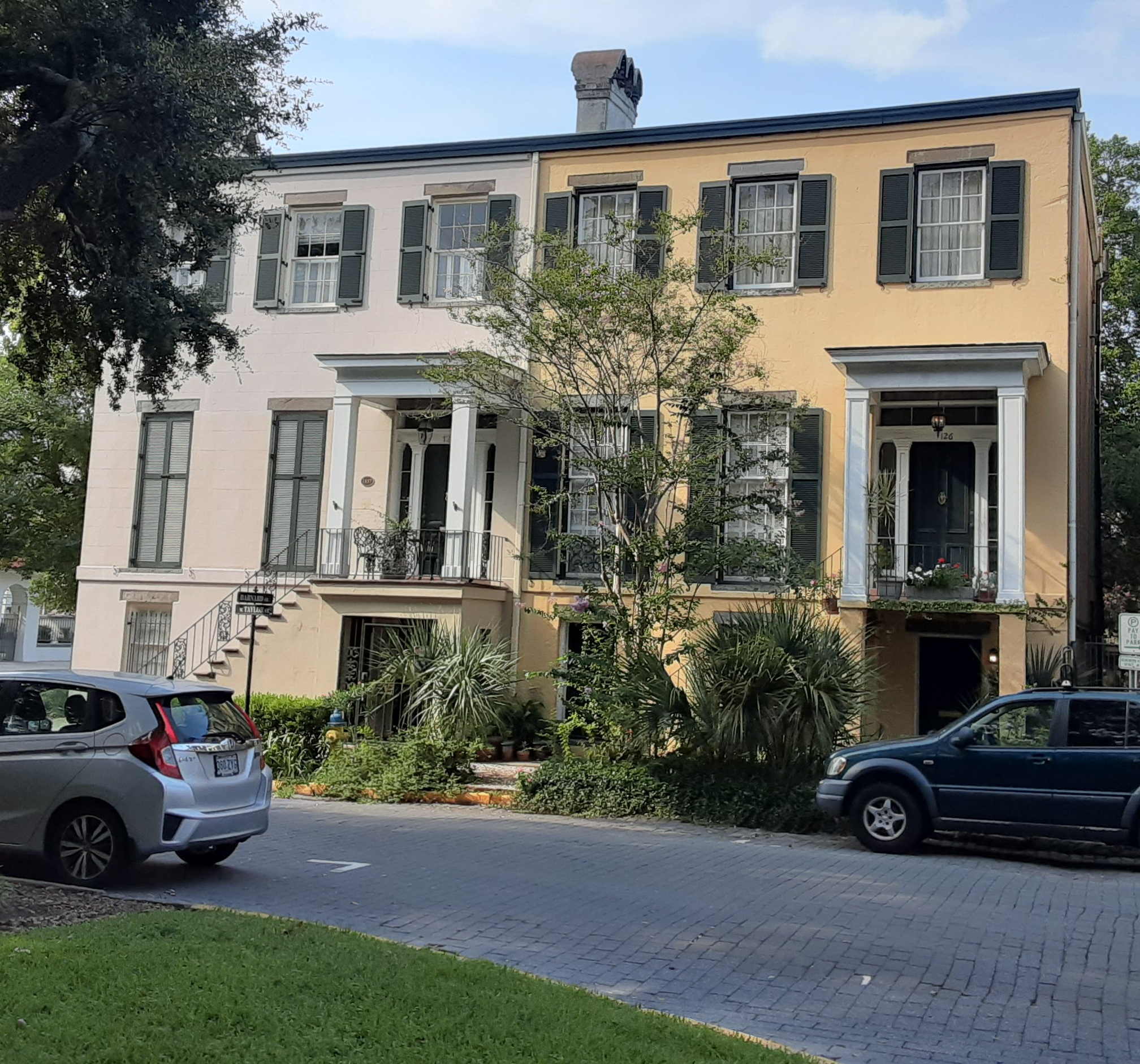
Edward Lovell Duplex, 126–128 West Taylor Street

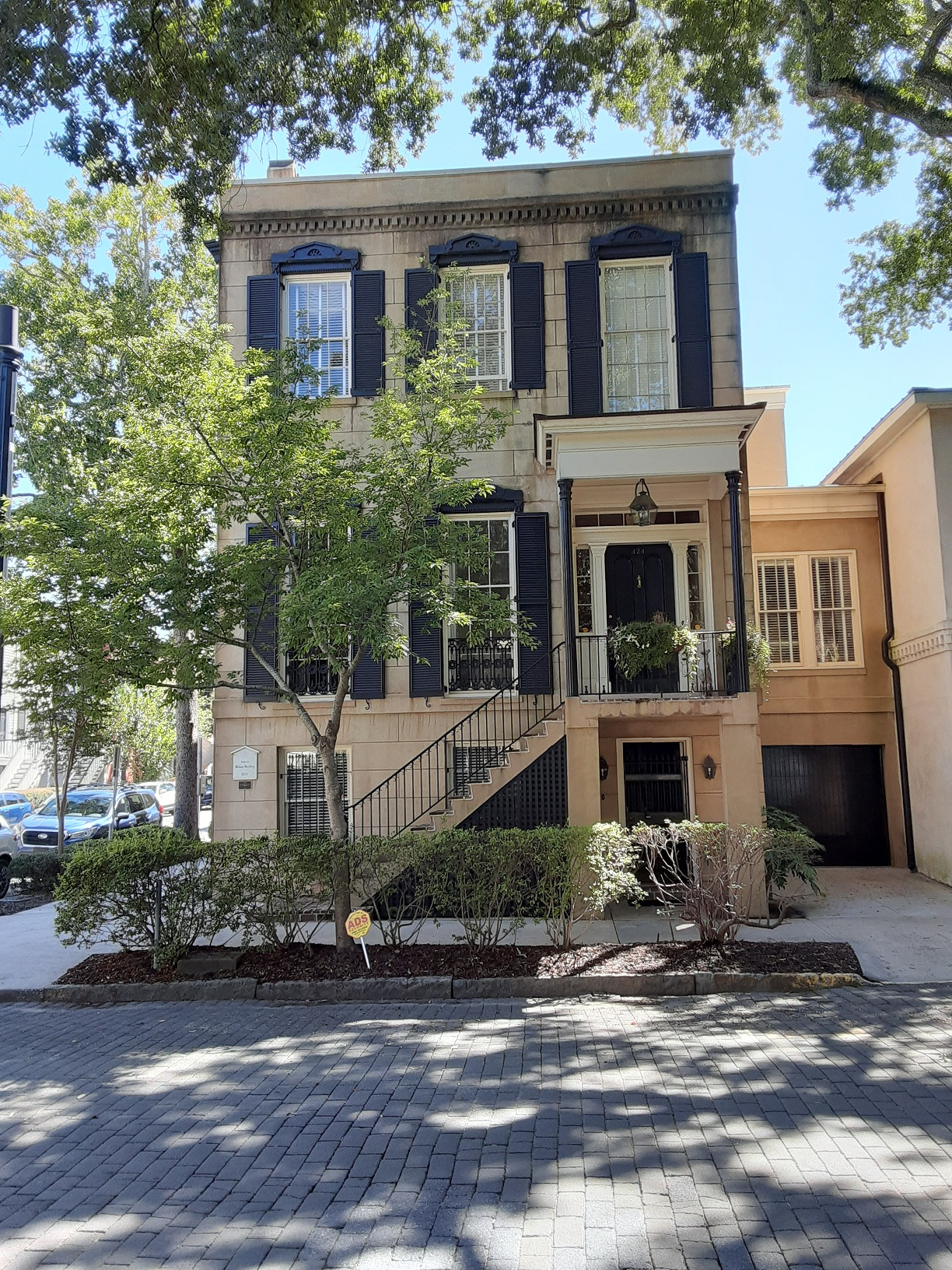
William Bradley House, 424 Barnard Street

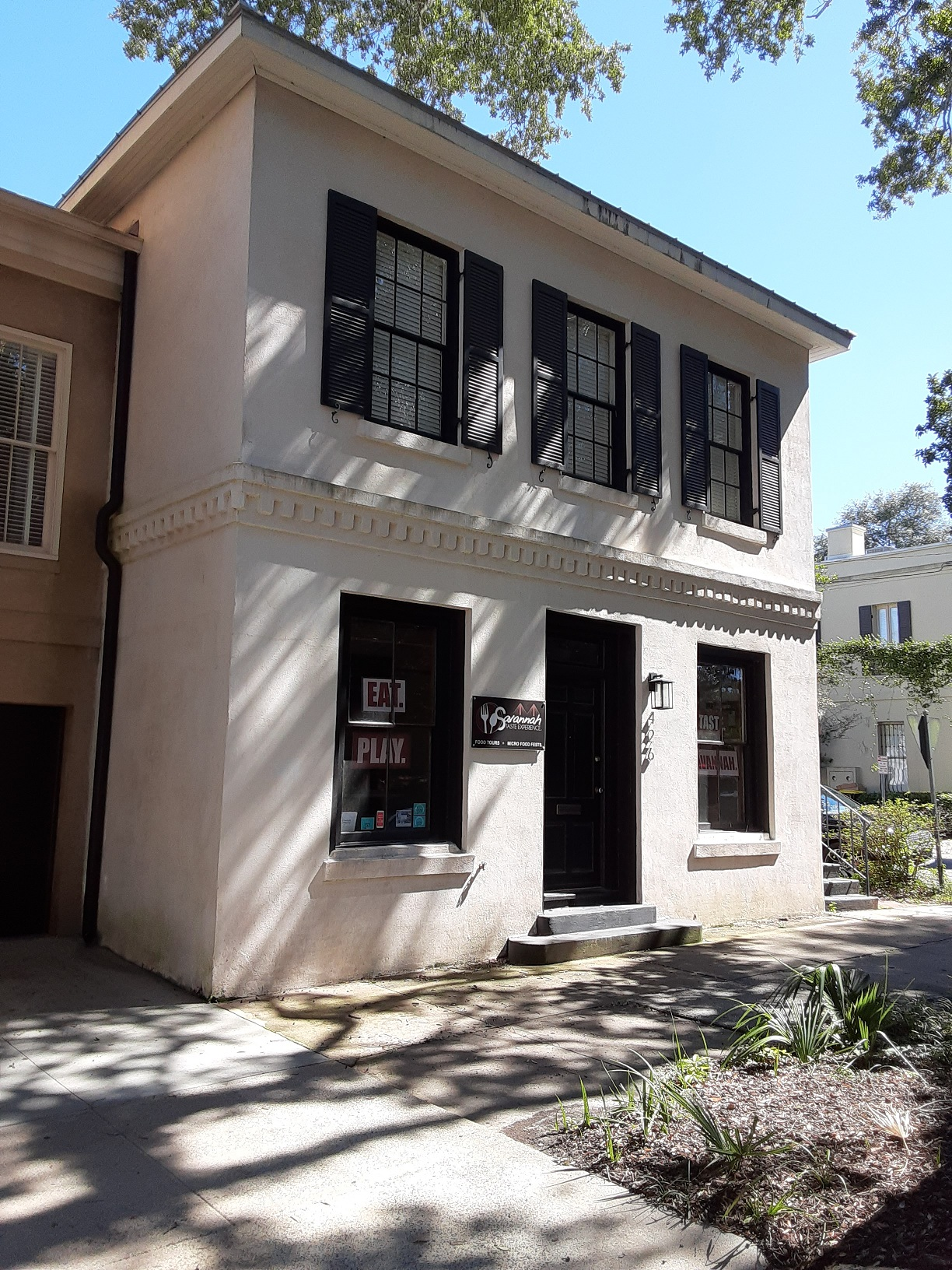
William Bradley Commercial Property, 426 Barnard Street

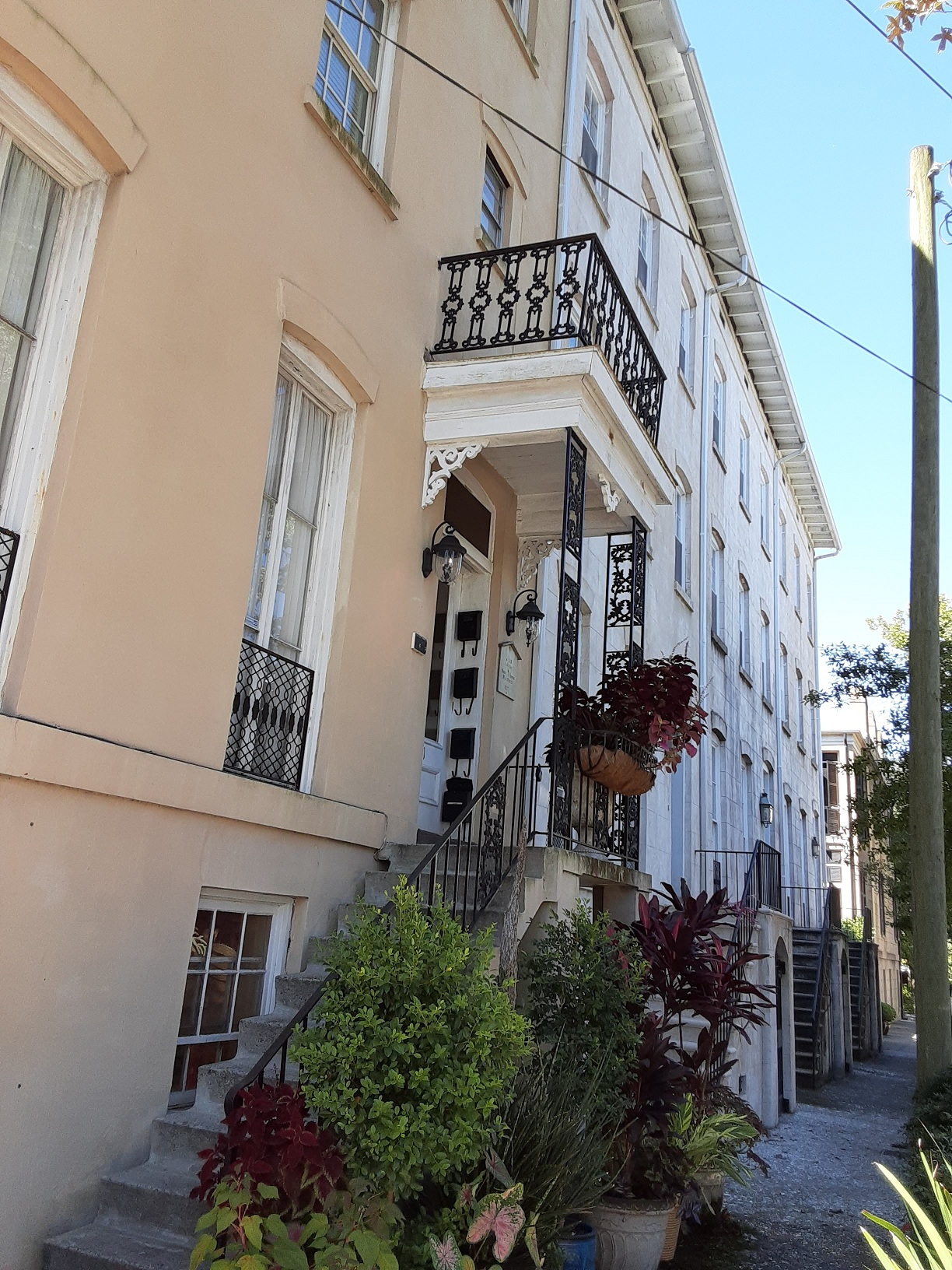
Meinhardt Row, 101–107 West Taylor Street

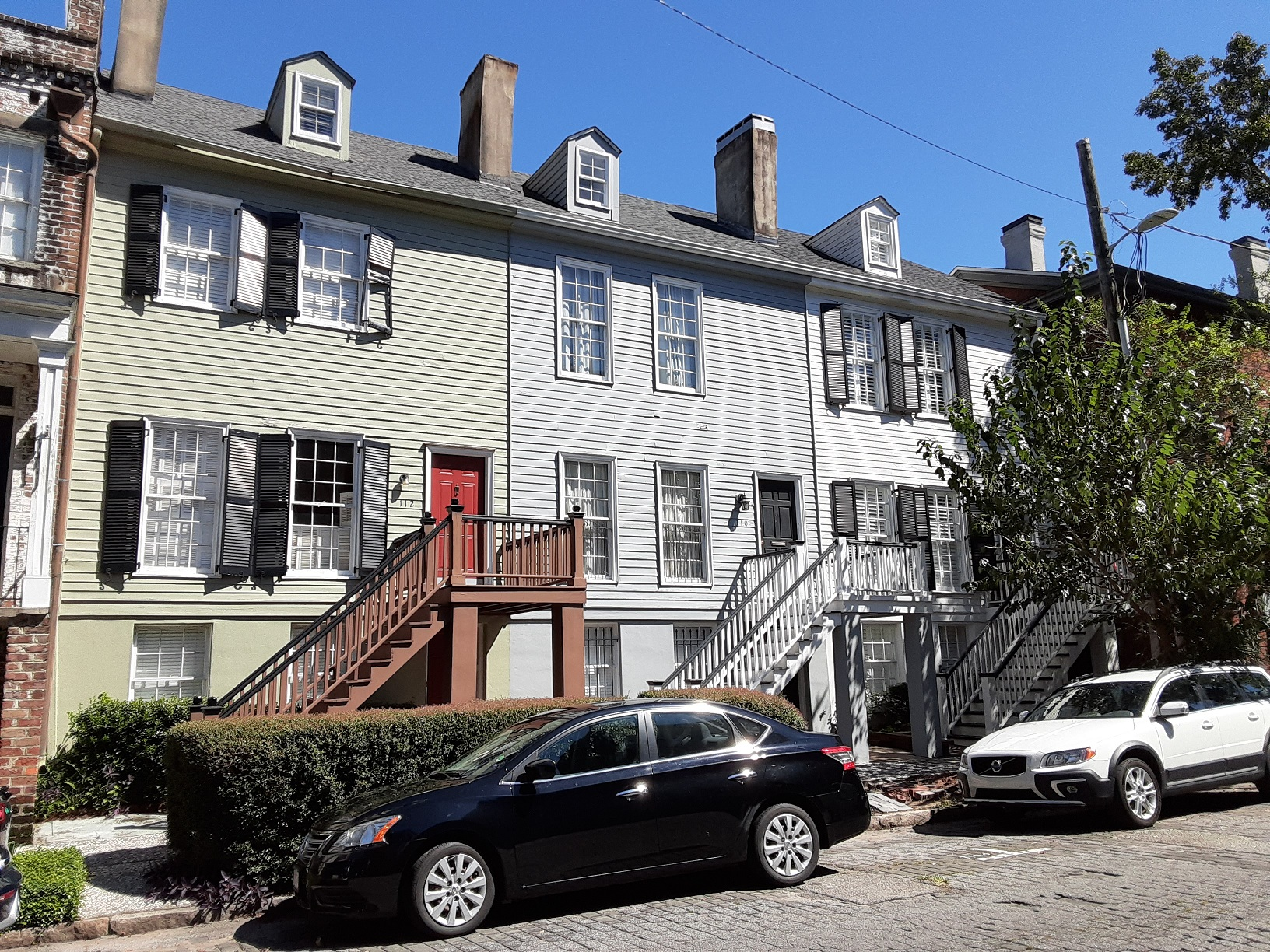
Enoch Hendry Row House, 108–112 West Taylor Street

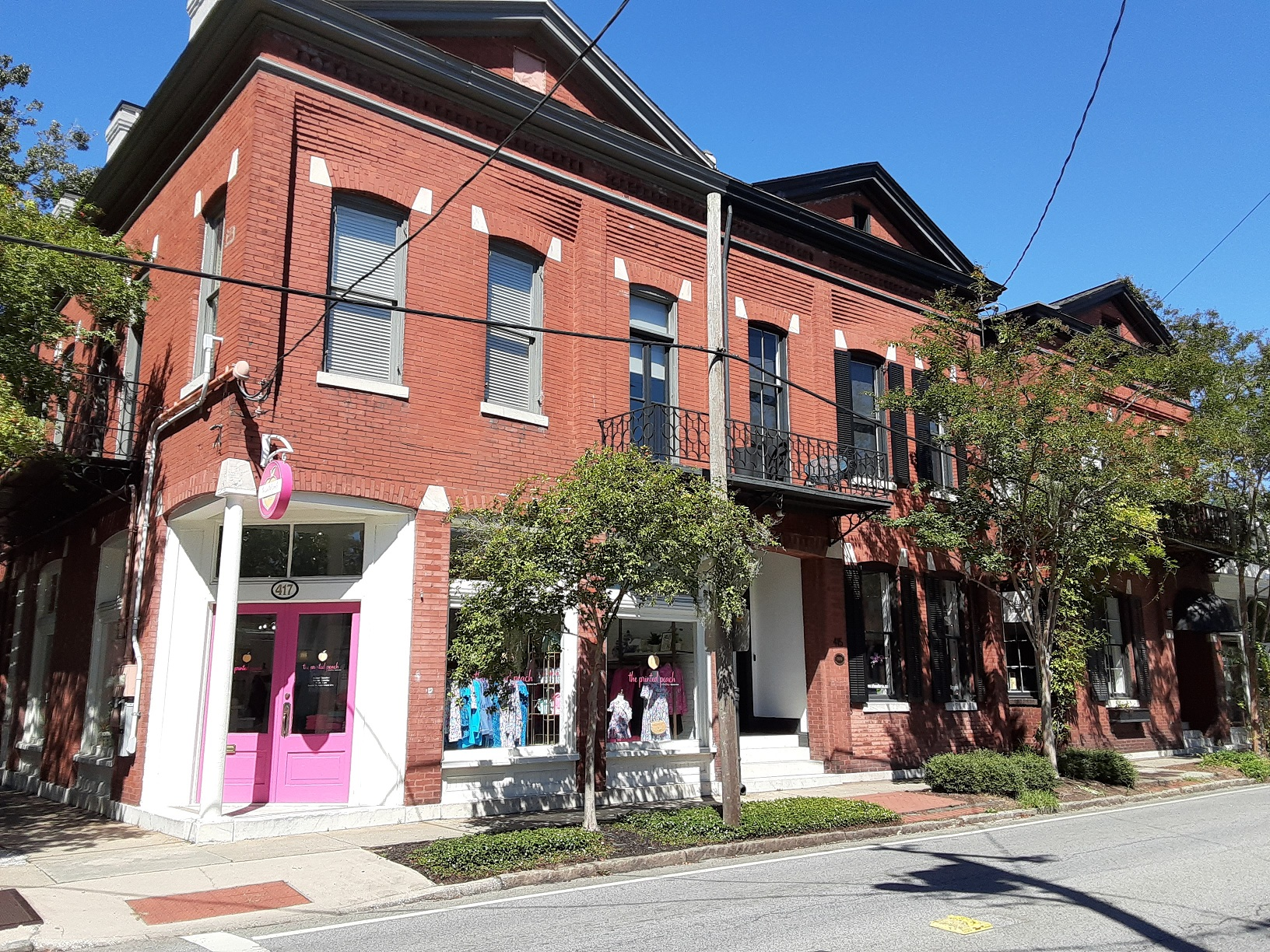
Frederick Kuck Property, 411–417 Whitaker Street

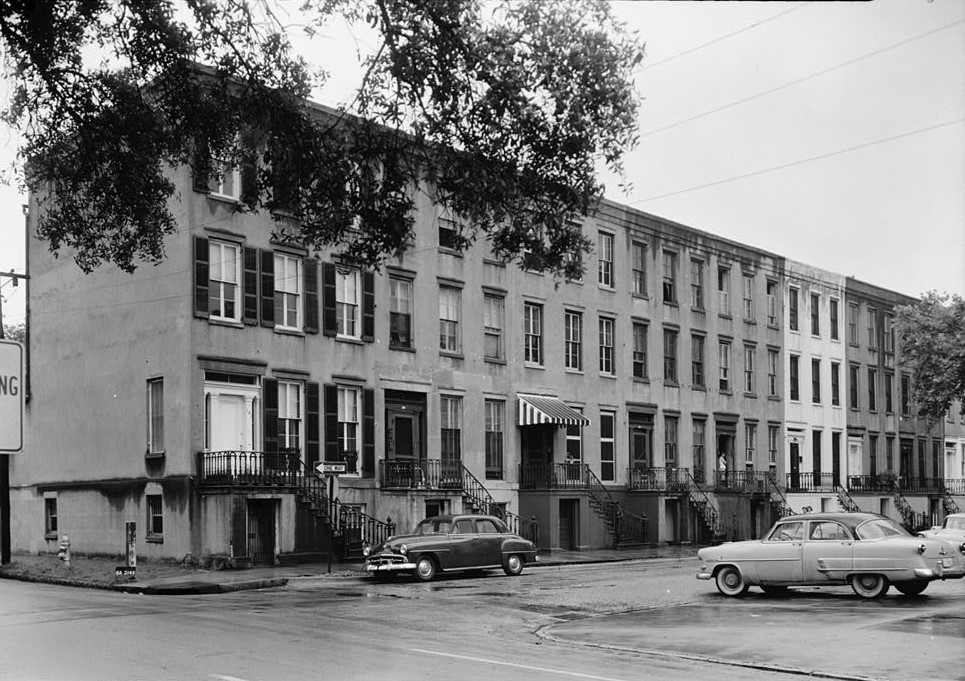
Gordon Row, 101–129 West Gordon Street, in the mid-20th century. Viewed from Whitaker Street, looking west

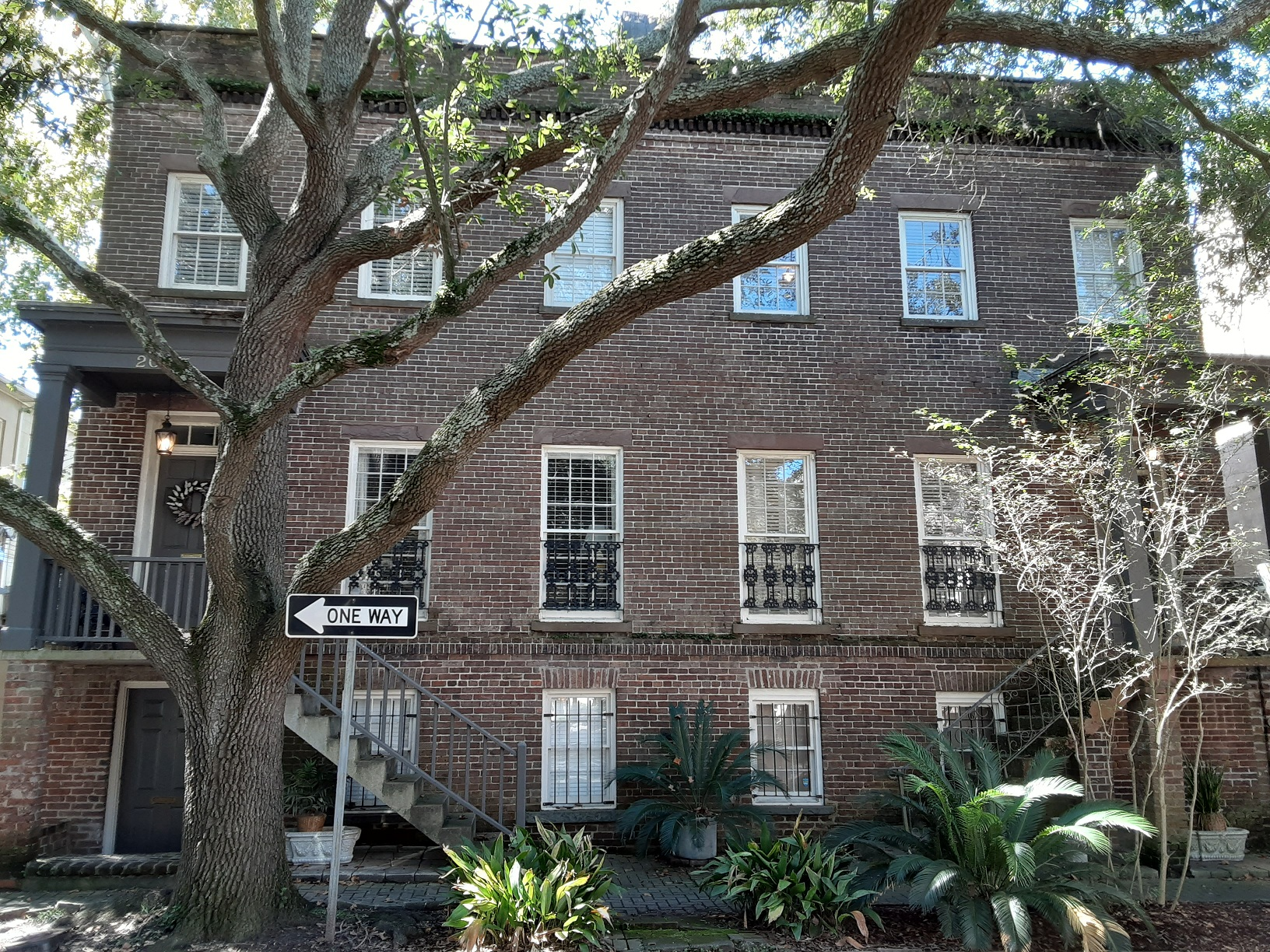
Thomas McArthur Duplex, 205–207 West Gordon Street

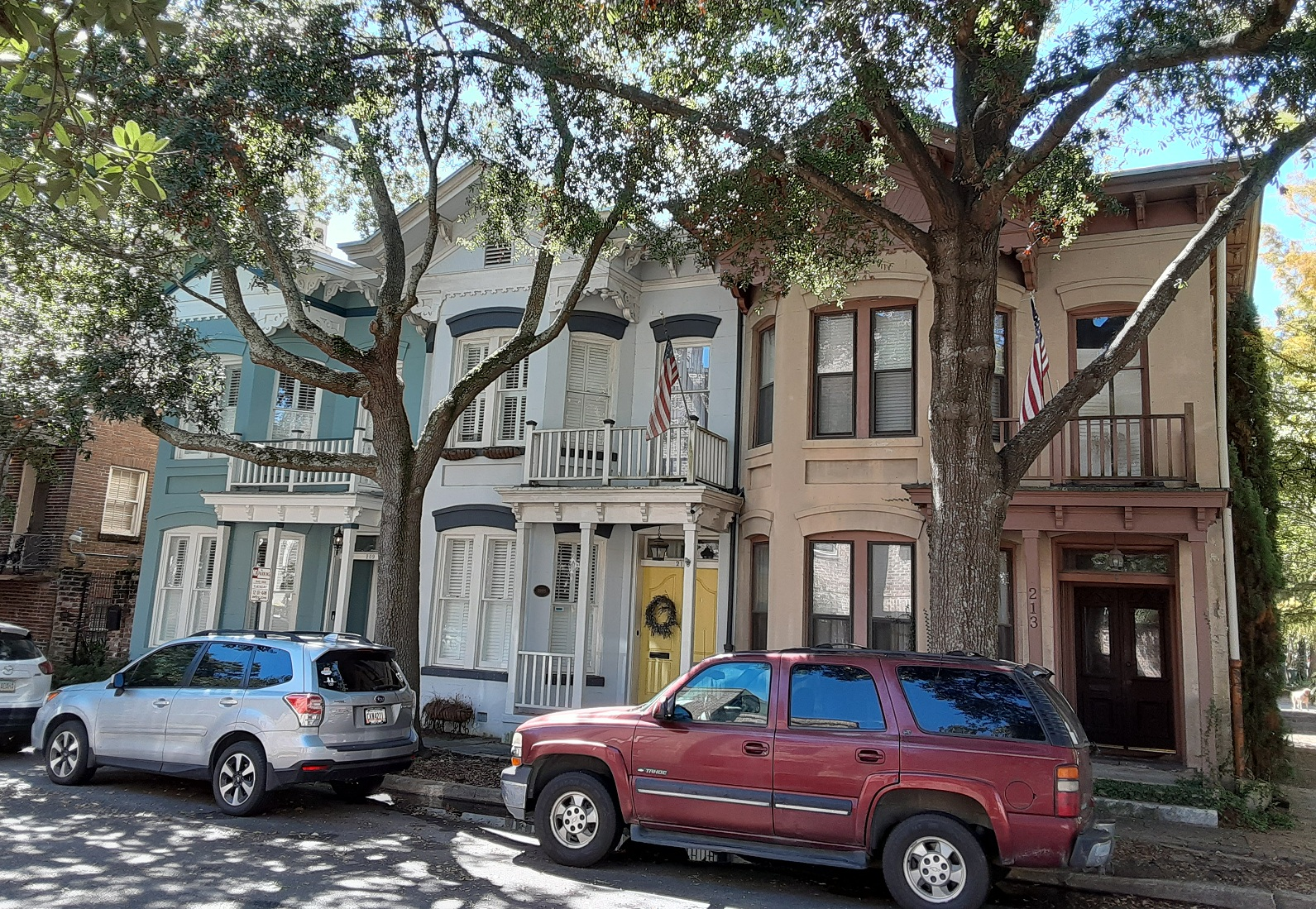
Matilda Heitman Properties, 209–213 West Gordon Street

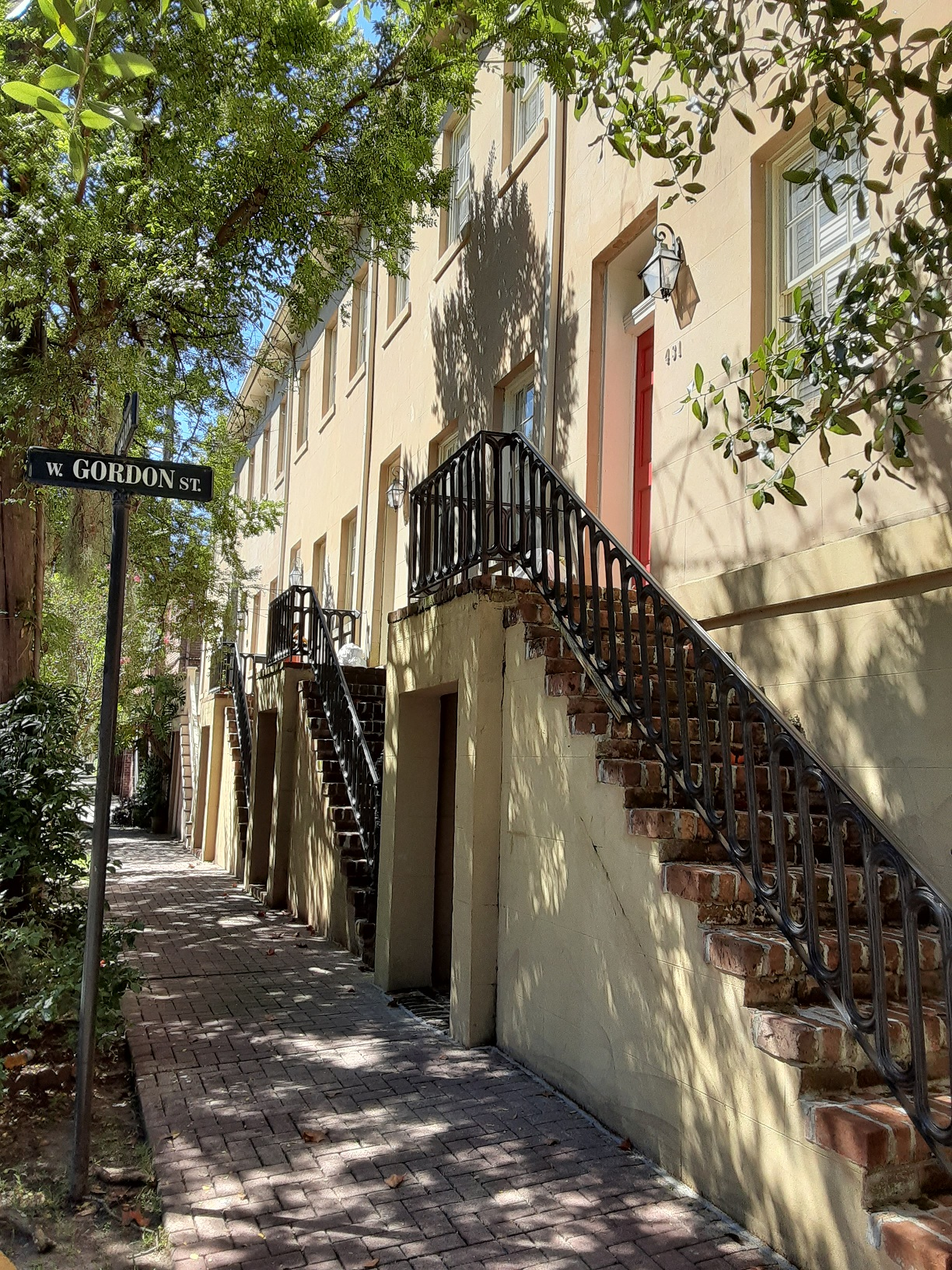
Dasher Row, 433–441 Barnard Street

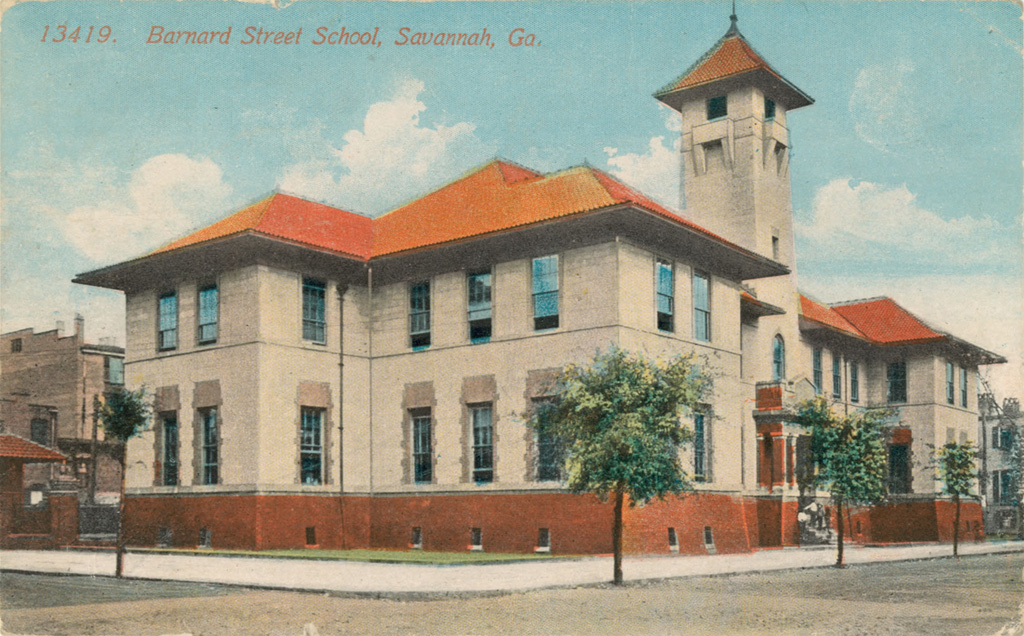
Barnard Street School, 212 West Taylor Street, as it looked around 1915
