= Buildings in Savannah Historic District =

Buildings in the historic area of Savannah, Georgia, US

The Savannah Historic District is a large urban U.S. historic district that roughly corresponds to the city limits of Savannah, Georgia, prior to the American Civil War. The area was declared a National Historic Landmark District in 1966, and is one of the largest districts of its kind in the United States. The district was made in recognition of the unique layout of the city, begun by James Oglethorpe at the city's founding in 1733 and propagated for over the first century of its growth.

The district is about 2 square miles (5.2 km^{2}) in area. It is bounded by the Savannah River on the north, Martin Luther King Jr. Boulevard on the west, Gwinnett Street and Forsyth Park on the south, and East Broad Street and Trustees' Garden on the east.

Below is an incomplete list of relevant buildings inside Savannah Historic District:

== Selected contributing properties ==
| Name | Ward | Image | Address | Year | Note |
|---|---|---|---|---|---|
| Mary Bradley Property | New Franklin Ward & Wharf Lots | | 318-320 Williamson Street | 1872 | |
| United Hydraulic Compress Company Building | New Franklin Ward & Wharf Lots | | 312-316 Williamson Street | 1874/1898 | Gutted by fire in 1898 |
| John Williamson Range | New Franklin Ward & Wharf Lots | | 302-310 Williamson Street/West Bay Street | 1819 | Improvements 1850; damaged by fires in 1879, 1889 & 1898 |
| Johnston Range | New Franklin Ward & Wharf Lots | | 220-230 West Bay Street | 1823 (by) | Three adjoining buildings; 224 damaged by fire in 1851 |
| Lowden Building | New Franklin Ward & Wharf Lots | | 214 West Bay Street | 1910 | |
| William Taylor Stores | New Franklin Ward & Wharf Lots | | 202-206 West Bay Street | 1806/1818 | Elements of the eastern half 1806; western portion 1818 |
| Jones and Telfair Range | New Franklin Ward & Wharf Lots | | 112-130 West Bay Street | 1852-1854 | By Charles Sholl and Calvin Fay |
| Savannah City Hall | New Franklin Ward & Wharf Lots | | 2 East Bay Street | 1904-1905 | By Hyman Witcover |
| Eugene Kelly Stores (Thomas Gamble Building) | New Franklin Ward & Wharf Lots | | 4-10 East Bay Street | 1877 | Replaced previous 1870 iteration (burned 1876); built for Eugene Kelly |
| Upper Stoddard Range | New Franklin Ward & Wharf Lots | | 12-42 East Bay Street (view from River Street) | 1859 | One of John Stoddard's two River Street ranges |
| Savannah Cotton Exchange | New Franklin Ward & Wharf Lots | | 100 East Bay Street | 1887 | By William G. Preston |
| Claghorn and Cunningham Range | New Franklin Ward & Wharf Lots | | 102-110 East Bay Street (view from River Street) | 1857 | Attributed to Charles Sholl and Calvin Fay; built concurrently with the Jones/De Renne Range |
| Jones/De Renne Range | New Franklin Ward & Wharf Lots | | 112-130 East Bay Street | 1857 | Superstructure utilized foundations of the prior c.1810 Jones Stores (east) and c.1813 Hunter Stores (west) |
| Archibald Smith Stores | New Franklin Ward & Wharf Lots | | 202-206 East Bay Street | 1810/1816 | Initially built 1810, expanded 1816 |
| Lower Stoddard Range (western portion) | New Franklin Ward & Wharf Lots | | 208-214 East Bay Street | 1858 | Superstructure utilized foundations of the prior 1811 Simon Fraser Stores |
| Lower Stoddard Range (eastern portion) | New Franklin Ward & Wharf Lots | | 216-230 East Bay Street (view from River Street) | 1858 | Superstructure utilized foundations of the prior 1809 Samuel Howard Stores |
| Scott & Balfour Stores/Andrew Low Stores | New Franklin Ward & Wharf Lots | | 302-316 East Bay Street | 1823/1850s | Host to Andrew Low & Company; additional level added 1850s |
| George Anderson Stores | New Franklin Ward & Wharf Lots | | 402-410 East Bay Street | 1835 | |
| Tidewater Oil Company Building | New Franklin Ward & Wharf Lots | | 504-516 East Bay Street/Factors Walk | 1892 | By Dennis J. Murphy |
| Savannah Gas Works Compound (aka, "Gas House Hill") | Trustees' Garden Ward | | East Broad Street Hill | 1853-1871 (between) | Prior site of Fort Wayne earthenworks; current brick walls do not appear on the 1853 Vincent Map but do appear by the 1871 Birdseye |
| Pirates' House | Trustees' Garden Ward | | 20 East Broad Street | 1794-1871 | |
| Herb House | Trustees' Garden Ward | | 26 East Broad Street | 1853 (by) | Despite some folklore dating it to the 1730s, the Mary Lane Morrison-edited Historic Savannah: A Survey of Significant Buildings in the Historic and Victorian Districts of Savannah, Georgia suggests 1853, the year it first appears on a map |
| Joseph Gammon Duplex | Trustees' Garden Ward | | 28-30 East Broad Street | 1840 | |
| Mary Foley House | Trustees' Garden Ward | | 36 East Broad Street | 1909 | |
| Archibald Smith House | Trustees' Garden Ward | | 48 East Broad Street | 1830 (prior to) | See also Archibald Smith Stores on the wharf |
| John Foley Duplex | Trustees' Garden Ward | | 52-56 East Broad Street | 1874 | Built for Major John Foley |
| Phoenix Iron Works/Kehoe Iron Foundry | Trustees' Garden Ward | | 656 East Broughton Street | 1873, altered 1883 | Part of SCAD |
| Yamacraw 43 Rows (demolished) | Middle Oglethorpe Ward | | Fahm Street | 1850 | Row houses built about 1850. Torn down 1940 for Yamacraw Village Housing Projects |
| William Scarbrough House | Middle Oglethorpe Ward | | 41 Martin Luther King Jr. Boulevard | 1819 | By William Jay, on the NRHP |
| First Bryan Baptist Church | Middle Oglethorpe Ward | | 575 West Bryan Street | 1888 | On the NRHP |
| Crites Hall, SCAD | South Oglethorpe Ward | | 217 Martin Luther King Jr. Boulevard | 1906 | Part of SCAD |
| Central of Georgia Railway Administrative "Gray Building" | South Oglethorpe/Railroad Ward | | 227 Martin Luther King Jr. Boulevard | 1856 | Now named Kiah Hall, part of SCAD; a National Historic Landmark since 1976 |
| Central of Georgia Railway, "Up Freight" Sheds remnants | South Oglethorpe/Railroad Ward | | 227 Martin Luther King Jr. Boulevard, rear | 1853 | Structural collapse in the 1990s, exterior walls still intact; part of SCAD |
| Central of Georgia Railway Administrative "Red Building" | South Oglethorpe/Railroad Ward | | 233 Martin Luther King Jr. Boulevard | 1888 | By Calvin Fay & Alfred Eichberg; part of SCAD |
| Central of Georgia Railway, "Down Freight" Sheds | South Oglethorpe/Railroad Ward | | 233 Martin Luther King Jr. Boulevard, rear | 1859 | Part of SCAD |
| Central of Georgia Railway, "Down Freight" Sheds | South Oglethorpe/Railroad Ward | | 233 Martin Luther King Jr. Boulevard, rear (courtyard view) | 1859 | Part of SCAD |
| Central of Georgia Train Terminal | South Oglethorpe/Railroad Ward | | 301 Martin Luther King Jr. Boulevard | 1860-1876 | Designed by Augustus Schwaab; today Savannah Visitors Center/Savannah History Museum |
| Central of Georgia Roundhouse and Machine Shops | Railroad Ward | | 655 Louisville Road | 1853 (begun) | Roundhouse/Repair Shops compound |
| George Wymberly Jones DeRenne (Estate of) Property | Franklin Ward | | 1 Jefferson Street | 1893 | Designed by Percy Sugden |
| Abram Minis Property (1) | Franklin Ward | | 20-22 Montgomery Street | 1846 | |
| First African Baptist Church | Franklin Ward | | 23 Montgomery Street | 1859-1861 | |
| Charles Sanberg Building | Franklin Ward | | 27 Montgomery Street | 1891 | Heavily remodeled between 2016-2021 |
| George Hardcastle Building | Franklin Ward | | 30-38 Montgomery Street | 1855 | |
| 37-39 Montgomery Street | Franklin Ward | | 37-39 Montgomery Street | 1916 | |
| Edward & Robert Lovell Building | Franklin Ward | | 318-320 West Broughton Street | 1891 | |
| Simon Byck Property | Franklin Ward | | 408 West Broughton Street | 1869 | |
| Charles Ochler Property | Franklin Ward | | 416-418 West Broughton Street | 1872 | |
| Margaret Downs Property | Franklin Ward | | 420 West Broughton Street | 1904 | |
| 305 West Bryan Street | Franklin Ward | | 305 West Bryan Street | 1855 | |
| 418 West Bryan Street | Franklin Ward | | 418 West Bryan Street | 1910 | |
| Michael Alberino Property | Franklin Ward | | 420 West Bryan Street | 1912 | |
| Charles Meitzler Building | Franklin Ward | | 307 West Congress Street | 1875 | |
| Germania Fire Company | Franklin Ward | | 315 West Congress Street | 1871 | |
| Augustus Walter Building (1) | Franklin Ward | | 401-403 West Congress Street | 1867 | |
| Augustus Walter Building (2) | Franklin Ward | | 405 West Congress Street | 1870 | |
| 409 West Congress Street | Franklin Ward | | 409 West Congress Street | 1872 | |
| James Brannen Building | Franklin Ward | | 419-423 West Congress Street | 1875 | Third story added 1906; roof development modern |
| Abram Minis Property (2) | Franklin Ward | | 302-304 West St. Julian Street | 1855 | |
| Charles Lamar Properties | Franklin Ward | | 305-307 West St. Julian Street | 1892 | |
| 309-315 West St. Julian Street | Franklin Ward | | 309-315 West St. Julian Street | 1902 | |
| 312 West St. Julian Street | Franklin Ward | | 312 West St. Julian Street | 1870 | |
| 314 West St. Julian Street | Franklin Ward | | 314 West St. Julian Street | 1870 | |
| David Dillon Building | Decker Ward | | 19 Barnard Street | 1855 | |
| John Montmollin Warehouse | Decker Ward | | 21 Barnard Street | 1855 | Later the Bryan Free School |
| Lawrence/Shaffer Building | Decker Ward | | 23-25 Barnard Street | 1848 | |
| 30-38 Barnard Street | Decker Ward | | 30-38 Barnard Street | 1920 (circa) | |
| James Johnston Building | Decker Ward | | 103 West Bay Street | 1819 | Third level added later |
| Savannah Morning News Building (west) | Decker Ward | | 109-111 West Bay Street | 1926 | |
| George W. Jones Building | Decker Ward | | 121-123 West Bay Street | 1852 | |
| Simon Guckenheimer Building | Decker Ward | | 225 West Bay Street | 1893 | By Calvin Fay & Alfred Eichberg |
| Alexander Smets Range (102 West Broughton facade) | Decker Ward | | 102 West Broughton Street | 1847-1853 (between) | |
| Alexander Smets Range (104 West Broughton facade) | Decker Ward | | 104 West Broughton Street | 1847-1853 (between) | |
| Alexander Smets Range (106 West Broughton facade) | Decker Ward | | 106 West Broughton Street | 1847-1853 (between) | |
| Alexander Smets Range (108 West Broughton facade) | Decker Ward | | 108 West Broughton Street | 1847 | |
| 110 West Broughton Street | Decker Ward | | 110 West Broughton Street | 1875 | |
| Kress Building | Decker Ward | | 120-122 West Broughton Street | 1923-1937 | |
| Willenski & Silver Building | Decker Ward | | 202-206 West Broughton Street | 1903 | |
| David Morrison Building | Decker Ward | | 212-218 West Broughton Street | 1905 | |
| Levy & Golden Building | Decker Ward | | 220-222 West Broughton Street | 1905 | |
| Thomas Gibbons Range | Decker Ward | | 102-116 West Congress Street (view from St. Julian Street) | 1820 | Thomas Gibbons (1757-1826): planter, politician, lawyer, steamboat owner |
| 103 West Congress Street | Decker Ward | | 103 West Congress Street | 1875 | |
| Lovell and Lattimore Store | Decker Ward | | 121-123 West Congress Street | 1859 | |
| Mohr Brothers Store | Decker Ward | | 125 West Congress Street | 1881 | |
| Lillenthal and Kohn Store | Decker Ward | | 127 West Congress Street | 1873 | |
| Joseph Bernstein Building | Decker Ward | | 201-207 West Congress Street | 1913 | |
| Frederick Herb (Estate of) Building | Decker Ward | | 209 West Congress Street | 1855 | |
| Robert McIntire Building | Decker Ward | | 222-228 West Congress Street (view from St. Julian Street) | 1890 | |
| James McIntire Building | Decker Ward | | 222-236 West St. Julian Street (view from Bryan Street) | 1855 | |
| Savannah Morning News Building (east) | Decker Ward | | 5 Whitaker Street | 1875 | Designed by Miller Grant |
| 37 Whitaker Street | Decker Ward | | 37 Whitaker Street | 1890 | |
| James Morrison Building | Derby Ward | | 1-7 Bull Street | 1819/1847 | Enlarged and remodeled 1847 and later |
| The Citizens and Southern Bank | Derby Ward | | 22 Bull Street | 1907 | Now Bank of America |
| Christ Church | Derby Ward | | 28 Bull Street | 1838/1897 | Mother church of Georgia, 1838 edifice third on the same site |
| 9 Drayton Street | Derby Ward | | 9 Drayton Street | 1853 | Built for George Wayne Anderson; later owned by Confederate Army veteran Edward Clifford Anderson Jr. |
| Citizens Bank Building | Derby Ward | | 15 Drayton Street | 1896 | By G.L. Norman; now part of SCAD |
| United States Custom House | Derby Ward | | 1-5 East Bay Street | 1848-1852 | By John S. Norris |
| Central Railroad Bank | Derby Ward | | 7 East Bay Street | 1853 | |
| George Owens House | Derby Ward | | 15-17 East Bay Street | 1822-1823 | |
| 25-27 East Bay Street | Derby Ward | | 25-27 East Bay Street | 1860/1915 | Original configuration 1860; altered, remodeled and enlarged 1895 & 1915 |
| Savannah Bank and Trust Co. | Derby Ward | | 2 East Bryan Street | 1911 | |
| Ann Hamilton House | Derby Ward | | 24-26 East Bryan Street | 1824 (circa) | Attributed to Amos Scudder, father of builders John and Ephraim Scudder |
| Manger Building (formerly Hotel Savannah) | Derby Ward | | 7 East Congress Street (32 Bull Street) | 1912 | First City Club of Savannah |
| Richard Stites Building | Derby Ward | | 5-11 West Bay Street | 1820 (circa) | |
| Solomon Cohen Building | Derby Ward | | 17 West Bay Street | 1869 | See additional Solomon Cohen properties (Jackson Ward, Pulaski Ward, Stephens Ward & Troup Ward) |
| 21 West Bay Street | Derby Ward | | 21 West Bay Street | 1821 | The original occupant, City Hotel, was Savannah's first hotel |
| John Lyons Building | Derby Ward | | 30-36 West Broughton Street | 1878 | |
| John L. Hardee Property | Derby Ward | | 22-24 West Bryan Street | 1878 | |
| Leroy Myers Cigar Company | Reynolds Ward | | 18 Abercorn Street | 1911 | Now Parish House for Christ Church |
| Habersham House | Reynolds Ward | | 23 Abercorn Street | 1789 | Also known as the "(Olde) Pink House", by Joseph Clay for James Habersham Jr., bought and restored by James Arthur Williams |
| Oliver Sturges House | Reynolds Ward | | 27 Abercorn Street | 1813 | Built for Oliver Sturges |
| John Wesley Hotel | Reynolds Ward | | 29 Abercorn Street | 1913 | Now Planters Inn on Reynolds Square |
| Lucas Theatre | Reynolds Ward | | 32 Abercorn Street | 1921 | Part of SCAD |
| 24 Drayton Street | Reynolds Ward | | 24 Drayton Street | 1924 | On the site of the former Merchants' National Bank Building |
| Hibernia Bank Building | Reynolds Ward | | 101 East Bay Street | 1914 | Now Savannah Area Chamber of Commerce |
| 105-107 East Bay Street | Reynolds Ward | | 105-107 East Bay Street | 1922 | |
| Oglethorpe Lodge Building | Reynolds Ward | | 113-119 East Bay Street | 1853 | |
| Edward Padelford Building (west) | Reynolds Ward | | 229-233 East Bay Street | 1853-1854 | Now the East Bay Inn |
| 202-208 East Broughton Street | Reynolds Ward | | 202-208 East Broughton Street | 1917 | |
| 9 Lincoln Street | Reynolds Ward | | 9 Lincoln Street | 1853 | |
| 226 East Bryan Street (17 Lincoln Street) | Reynolds Ward | | 17 Lincoln Street | 1852 | The home of Abe's on Lincoln since 2010 |
| Edward Padelford Building (east) | Warren Ward | | 301 East Bay Street | 1851 | Now Staybridge Suites |
| 417 East Bay Street | Warren Ward | | 417 East Bay Street | 1875 (circa) | |
| John Eppinger Property | Warren Ward | | 425 East Bay Street | 1809 | Moved from Elbert Ward (219 Jefferson Street) |
| John Berrien House | Warren Ward | | 322-324 East Broughton Street | 1790-1797 | Built for Major John Berrien. House raised 1917. During the remodeling of 2012–2016, the house was lowered again, onto an 18th-century-style ground floor construction |
| John Deubell House | Warren Ward | | 410-416 East Broughton Street | 1809 or before | |
| William Lake Building | Warren Ward | | 418 East Broughton Street | 1871 | |
| John Entelman Property | Warren Ward | | 420-422 East Broughton Street | 1898 | See additional John Entelman properties (Stephens Ward & Wesley Ward) |
| John Eppinger (Estate of) Property | Warren Ward | | 404 East Bryan Street | 1821-1823 | Moved from Jackson Ward (211 West Perry Street) |
| Patrick Shiels House | Warren Ward | | 410 East Bryan Street | 1848 | See also Patrick Shiels Property (Columbia Ward) |
| Dennis O'Connell House | Warren Ward | | 416 East Bryan Street | 1888 | |
| Mary Driscoll House | Warren Ward | | 418 East Bryan Street | 1898 | |
| John Ballon Property (1) | Warren Ward | | 417 East Congress Street | 1839 | Built for John Ballon, Free Man of Color |
| John Ballon Property (2) | Warren Ward | | 419 East Congress Street | 1839 | Built for John Ballon, Free Man of Color |
| 425 East Congress Street | Warren Ward | | 425 East Congress Street | 1799-1808 (between) | |
| Margaret Pendergast House | Warren Ward | | 420 East St. Julian Street | 1868 | |
| Henry Willink Cottage | Warren Ward | | 426 East St. Julian Street | 1845 | Moved from Crawford Ward (231 Price Street) in November, 1964, replacing a structure torn down by Anne and Mills Lane. |
| Hugh Cullen Property | Warren Ward | | 3-5 Habersham Street | 1854 | |
| Paul Hamilton Wilkins House | Warren Ward | | 7 Habersham Street | 1791-1794 (between) | |
| John Strous House | Warren Ward | | 11 Habersham Street | 1852 | |
| Spencer–Woodbridge House | Warren Ward | | 22 Habersham Street | 1790-1804 (between) | Also known as the George Basil Spencer House |
| John David Mongin House | Warren Ward | | 24 Habersham Street | 1797 (circa) | Moved from 25 Habersham (across the square) |
| Harry Schroder Duplex | Warren Ward | | 32-34 Habersham Street | 1898 | |
| Elizabeth Heery House | Warren Ward | | 17 Price Street | 1857 | |
| 601 East Bay Street | Washington Ward | | 601 East Bay Street (view from Houston Street) | 1860 | |
| 31 East Broad Street | Washington Ward | | 31 East Broad Street | 1860 | |
| James McMahon House | Washington Ward | | 37-39 East Broad Street | 1874 | |
| Charles Wood Row House | Washington Ward | | 41-47 East Broad Street | 1899 | |
| Frank Walsh House | Washington Ward | | 506 East Broughton Street | 1887 | |
| Bridget McAuliffe House | Washington Ward | | 508 East Broughton Street | 1898 | |
| 530 East Broughton Street | Washington Ward | | 530 East Broughton Street | 1884 | |
| Mary Spear House | Washington Ward | | 532 East Broughton Street | 1820 (circa); raised 1879 | Built for Mary Spear, Free Woman of Color |
| Abrahams Home | Washington Ward | | 548 East Broughton Street | 1858 | By John S. Norris |
| Margaret Prindible Property | Washington Ward | | 508-512 East Bryan Street | 1892 | |
| Mary Gildea House | Washington Ward | | 514 East Bryan Street | 1899 | |
| Mary Horrigan Property | Washington Ward | | 520-522 East Bryan Street | 1899 | |
| William Gaston House | Washington Ward | | 511 East Congress Street | 1839 (circa) | Remodeled 1869 |
| Isabella Mallery House | Washington Ward | | 513 East Congress Street | 1841 | |
| Isabella Brower House | Washington Ward | | 519 East Congress Street | 1837-1839 | |
| Joseph Burke Properties | Washington Ward | | 541-545 East Congress Street | 1860 | |
| Ann Pinder House | Washington Ward | | 547 East Congress Street | 1831-1835 | |
| William Flood House | Washington Ward | | 501 East St. Julian Street | 1901 | |
| Anne Pitman House | Washington Ward | | 504 East St. Julian Street | 1842 | |
| Hampton Lillibridge House | Washington Ward | | 507 East St. Julian Street (moved from 310 East Bryan Street) | 1796–1799 | Image from prior location on Bryan Street. Bought, moved & restored by James Arthur Williams |
| Odingsells House | Washington Ward | | 510 East St. Julian Street | 1797 | Built for Major Charles Odingsells; restored by James Arthur Williams |
| Morty Dorgan Property (1) | Washington Ward | | 542 East St. Julian Street | 1853 | Remodeled 1888-1898 |
| Mary Ferguson House | Washington Ward | | 549 East St. Julian Street | 1905 | |
| Joseph Wilkinson House | Washington Ward | | 11 Houston Street | 1807 | Remodeled 1899 |
| Morty Dorgan Property (2) | Washington Ward | | 20 Houston Street | 1852-1853 | |
| Simon Mirault House | Washington Ward | | 21 Houston Street (moved from Troup Ward) | 1852 | Built for Simon Mirault, Free Man of Color |
| Joachim Hartstene House | Washington Ward | | 23 Houston Street | 1803 (circa) | Rebuilt with original members, 1964 |
| Catherine McCarthy Property | Washington Ward | | 26-30 Houston Street | 1887 | |
| Laurence Dunn Property (1) | Washington Ward | | 31-33 Houston Street | 1875 | By Augustus Schwaab |
| Laurence Dunn Property (2) | Washington Ward | | 35-37 Houston Street | 1872 | |
| D.D. Williams House | Washington Ward | | 12 Price Street | 1816 | |
| William Williams House | Washington Ward | | 16 Price Street | 1809 (by) | |
| William Wescott House | Washington Ward | | 36 Price Street | 1874 | |
| Stephen Timmons Cottage | Washington Ward | | 40 Price Street | 1841 | |
| 109-111 Jefferson Street | Liberty Ward | | 109-111 Jefferson Street | 1909 | |
| Anna Keilbach Building (north) | Liberty Ward | | 113-115 Jefferson Street | 1883 | |
| Anna Keilbach Building (south) | Liberty Ward | | 117–119 Jefferson Street | 1883 | |
| Congregation B'nai B'rith (former site) | Liberty Ward | | 120 Montgomery Street | 1908 | By Hyman Witcover; now part of SCAD |
| James Hart Building | Liberty Ward | | 144-146 Montgomery Street | 1888 | |
| 301-303 West Broughton Street | Liberty Ward | | 301-303 West Broughton Street | 1851 | Altered 1930, early 2000s |
| 311 West Broughton Street | Liberty Ward | | 311 West Broughton Street | 1916 | |
| John Tietgen Building | Liberty Ward | | 306 West State Street | 1908 | |
| Frederick Selleck Property (1) | Liberty Ward | | 305 West York Street | 1822 | |
| Frederick Selleck Property (2) | Liberty Ward | | 311 West York Street | 1822 | |
| 323 West York Street | Liberty Ward | | 323 West York Street | 1900 | |
| Henry Hayme Building | Heathcote Ward | | 114 Barnard Street | 1889 | |
| Telfair Family Mansion | Heathcote Ward | | 121 Barnard Street | 1820/1880 | By William Jay; enlarged and altered in the 1880s to become the Telfair Academy |
| Trinity Methodist Church | Heathcote Ward | | 127 Barnard Street | 1848 | By John B. Hogg |
| Julia Dancy Range | Heathcote Ward | | 134-142 Jefferson Street | 1884 | |
| Jacob Waldburg Building | Heathcote Ward | | 101-105 West Broughton Street | 1866 | |
| Edward Lovell Building (east) | Heathcote Ward | | 109-113 West Broughton Street | 1875 (circa) | Longtime Savannah location for JCPenney |
| Edward Lovell Building (west) | Heathcote Ward | | 115 West Broughton Street | 1890 | See also Edward Lovell Properties (Chatham Ward, Decker Ward & Percival Ward) |
| 121 West Broughton Street | Heathcote Ward | | 121 West Broughton Street | 1889 | |
| Hogan & Douglas Building | Heathcote Ward | | 123-125 West Broughton Street | 1889 | |
| 201 West Broughton Street | Heathcote Ward | | 201 West Broughton Street | 1900 | |
| 205-207 West Broughton Street | Heathcote Ward | | 205-207 West Broughton Street | 1889 | |
| Robert Walker Row House | Heathcote Ward | | 213-223 West York Street | 1905 | |
| A.R. Altmeyer Building | Percival Ward | | 110-118 Bull Street | 1892 | Designed by Alfred Eichberg |
| 111-119 Bull Street | Percival Ward | | 111-119 Bull Street | 1907 | |
| Lutheran Church of the Ascension | Percival Ward | | 120 Bull Street (21 East State Street) | 1878 | Designed by George B. Clarke |
| Old Chatham County Courthouse | Percival Ward | | 124 Bull Street | 1889 | By William G. Preston |
| US Post Office/Court House | Percival Ward | | 125 Bull Street | 1896/1931 | Southern half of the structure 1896–1899; northern half 1931-32 |
| 135-139 Bull Street | Percival Ward | | 135-139 Bull Street | 1875 | |
| John Schwarz Building | Percival Ward | | 136-140 Bull Street | 1890 | Designed by Alfred Eichberg; remodeled 1907 and 1913 |
| 143 Bull Street | Percival Ward | | 143 Bull Street | 1905 | Carriage house of 4 West Oglethorpe Avenue |
| Wayne–Gordon House | Percival Ward | | 10 East Oglethorpe Avenue | 1820/1886 | On the NRHP; third story added 1886 |
| George Anderson House | Percival Ward | | 14 East Oglethorpe Avenue | 1853/1892 | Enlarged 1892 by William G. Preston; former home of George Wayne Anderson Previously The Ballastone Inn renamed The Drayton in 2024 |
| William Williams House | Percival Ward | | 18 East Oglethorpe Avenue | 1826/1873 | Raised and remodeled 1873; now Ballastone Inn |
| 6 East State Street | Percival Ward | | 6 East State Street | 1900 (by) | |
| 8 East State Street | Percival Ward | | 8 East State Street | 1929 | |
| A. D. Hevirance Building | Percival Ward | | 14 East State Street | 1908 | |
| 18 East State Street | Percival Ward | | 18 East State Street | 1905 | |
| Patrick Duffy Building | Percival Ward | | 24 East State Street | 1855 | Home of Bradley Lock and Key since 1967 |
| Peter Ott Property | Percival Ward | | 15-19 East York Street | 1892 | |
| Esther Stewart Property | Percival Ward | | 21-25 East York Street | 1853-1856 | |
| Hodgson–Telfair Commercial Building | Percival Ward | | 1 West Broughton Street | 1854-1855 | 1913-24 (remodeled between) |
| 5-9 West Broughton Street | Percival Ward | | 5-9 West Broughton Street | 1867 | |
| 11-15 West Broughton Street | Percival Ward | | 11-15 West Broughton Street | 1867 | |
| Anderson–Leslee House | Percival Ward | | 4 West Oglethorpe Avenue | 1836/1867 | |
| 12 West Oglethorpe Avenue | Percival Ward | | 12 West Oglethorpe Avenue | 1898 | |
| Samuel White Property | Percival Ward | | 14-18 West Oglethorpe Avenue | 1899 | |
| William Waring Property | Percival Ward | | 12 West State Street | 1824-1825 | |
| Edward Lovell Property | Percival Ward | | 14 West State Street | 1853 | See also Edward Lovell Properties (Chatham Ward, Decker Ward & Heathcote Ward) |
| Isaac Morrell Building | Percival Ward | | 16 West State Street | 1853 | |
| 18 West State Street | Percival Ward | | 18 West State Street | 1916 | |
| Lindsay & Morgan Building | Percival Ward | | 5-11 West York Street | 1921 | |
| Thomas Henderson Building | Percival Ward | | 15-21 West York Street | 1890 | |
| 116 Whitaker Street | Percival Ward | | 116 Whitaker Street | 1866 | |
| 144-152 Whitaker Street | Percival Ward | | 144-152 Whitaker Street | 1898 | |
| Owens–Thomas House | Anson Ward | | 124 Abercorn Street | 1817-1819 | By William Jay, on the NRHP Jay's earliest structure in Savannah |
| Owens–Thomas House Slave Quarters | Anson Ward | | 124 Abercorn Street, rear (view from Lincoln Street) | 1817-1819 | A rare & intact example of a 19th-century urban slave dwelling |
| Mary Marshall Houses | Anson Ward | | 127-129 Abercorn Street | 1845-1859 (circa) | Lower two levels likely c.1845 by Charles B. Cluskey, upper two levels likely 1859; today's rear half 20th century addition |
| 143 Abercorn Street | Anson Ward | | 143 Abercorn Street | 1914 | |
| The Marshall House | Anson Ward | | 123 East Broughton Street | 1851-1852 | Opened 1852; iron veranda added 1857 (recreated in the 20th century) |
| Avon Theatre | Anson Ward | | 125 East Broughton Street | 1944–1946 | Now the Savannah Taphouse |
| Eppinger House | Anson Ward | | 110 East Oglethorpe Avenue | 1776 (lower two levels prior to); upper level added 1876 | Likely the oldest intact brick structure in Savannah |
| Marmaduke Hamilton Property | Anson Ward | | 112-114 East Oglethorpe Avenue | 1872 | |
| John and Marmaduke Hamilton Property | Anson Ward | | 116 East Oglethorpe Avenue | 1869 | |
| Christian Camphor Cottage | Anson Ward | | 122 East Oglethorpe Avenue | 1760-1767 (circa), raised 1871; balcony remodeled 1907 | Likely the oldest surviving structure in Savannah |
| John Rowland Property (west) | Anson Ward | | 124-126 East Oglethorpe Avenue | 1895 | By J.A. Sullivan |
| John Rowland Property (east) | Anson Ward | | 132 East Oglethorpe Avenue | 1872 | |
| Henry Dickerson Row | Anson Ward | | 204-216 East Oglethorpe Avenue | 1872-1874 | By Gilbert Butler |
| William Rahn House (Dr. Charlton House) | Anson Ward | | 220-222 East Oglethorpe Avenue | 1853 | |
| William Duncan House | Anson Ward | | 224 East Oglethorpe Avenue | 1883 | |
| Oscar Dibble House | Anson Ward | | 228 East Oglethorpe Avenue | 1855 | |
| Mary Marshall Row | Anson Ward | | 230-244 East Oglethorpe Avenue | 1855-1856 | |
| Standard Oil Building | Anson Ward | | 110 East President Street | 1924 | |
| Graham Apartment Building | Anson Ward | | 210 East State Street | 1924 | |
| 216 East State Street | Anson Ward | | 216 East State Street | 1912 | |
| Michael Lyons Property | Anson Ward | | 220-224 East State Street | 1893 | |
| Marine Hospital | Anson Ward | | 115 East York Street | 1907 | Part of SCAD |
| Henry Dickerson Duplex | Anson Ward | | 201-203 East York Street | 1853 | |
| James Mills House | Anson Ward | | 205 East York Street | 1855 | |
| Jane Young House | Anson Ward | | 211 East York Street | 1853 | |
| John Feely Duplex | Anson Ward | | 217-219 East York Street | 1872 | |
| Charles Landershine House | Anson Ward | | 221 East York Street | 1856 | |
| 111-117 Lincoln Street | Anson Ward | | 111-117 Lincoln Street | 1918 | |
| Gordon–Anderson Building ("President's Quarters Inn") | Anson Ward | | 127-131 Lincoln Street (view from East York Street) | 1855 | By John Scudder |
| Joseph Sognier Property (1) | Anson Ward | | 133-135 Lincoln Street | 1886 | By P.J. Fallon |
| Joseph Sognier Property (2) | Anson Ward | | 139-141 Lincoln Street | 1886 | By P.J. Fallon |
| Robert Kennedy Property | Columbia Ward | | 323 East Broughton Street | 1890 | |
| Humphrey Gwathney House | Columbia Ward | | 401 East Broughton Street | 1822-1823 | Remodeled 1883 |
| Patrick Shiels Property | Columbia Ward | | 417-421 East Broughton Street | 1843 | Raised & enlarged 1905; store front added 1965; see also Patrick Shiels House (Warren Ward) |
| John Ruwe Duplex | Columbia Ward | | 310-312 East Oglethorpe Avenue | 1875 | By George Sanders |
| Thomas Rodman Property | Columbia Ward | | 314 East Oglethorpe Avenue | 1809 (by) | Enlarged 1911 |
| William Spencer House | Columbia Ward | | 322 East Oglethorpe Avenue | 1809 (by) | Enlarged 1884 |
| 17 Hundred 90 Inn | Columbia Ward | | 307 East President Street (view from Lincoln Street) | 1823/1888 | Eastern portion (1823) built for Steele White, western portion (1888) built for Anna Powers |
| Abraham Scribner House | Columbia Ward | | 424 East President Street | 1810 | Remodeled 1899 |
| Edward Moran Duplex | Columbia Ward | | 302-308 East State Street | 1856 | By John Scudder |
| Isaiah Davenport House | Columbia Ward | | 324 East State Street | 1820 | By Isaiah Davenport, on the NRHP |
| Francis M. Stone House | Columbia Ward | | 402 East State Street | 1821 | |
| "Laura's Cottage" | Columbia Ward | | 416 East State Street | 1799-1808 (between) | Moved from Greene Ward |
| Timothy Bonticou Double House | Columbia Ward | | 418-420 East State Street | 1854-1861 | Moved from 419 to 421 East Broughton Lane, 1972 |
| Henry Willink Duplex | Columbia Ward | | 422-424 East State Street | 1850 (circa) | |
| Jerome H. Wilson House | Columbia Ward | | 307-311 East York Street | 1872 | |
| Thomas Morgan House | Columbia Ward | | 313–315 East York Street | 1885 | |
| Abraham Sheftall House | Columbia Ward | | 321 East York Street | 1818 | Moved from Elbert Ward, 1966 |
| 409 East York Street | Columbia Ward | | 409 East York Street | 1880 | |
| Kehoe House II | Columbia Ward | | 123 Habersham Street | 1892 | Built for William Kehoe, by DeWitt Bruyn |
| Frederick Heineman House | Columbia Ward | | 125-127 Habersham Street | 1842 | |
| Green Fleetwood House | Columbia Ward | | 128 Habersham Street | 1854 | |
| Kehoe House I | Columbia Ward | | 130 Habersham Street | 1885 | |
| The Frederick Ball House | Columbia Ward | | 136 Habersham Street | 1805 | By Frederick Ball, master carpenter, 1809 |
| Joseph Gammon Property | Columbia Ward | | 134 Lincoln Street | 1843 | |
| 111 East Broad Street | Greene Ward | | 111 East Broad Street | 1841 | |
| Michael Lavin (Estate of) Property | Greene Ward | | 143 East Broad Street | 1888-1889 | |
| Daniel O'Connor Row House | Greene Ward | | 507-511 East Broughton Street | 1883 | |
| 506-508 East Oglethorpe Avenue | Greene Ward | | 506-508 East Oglethorpe Avenue | 1890 | |
| 510-512 East Oglethorpe Avenue | Greene Ward | | 510-512 East Oglethorpe Avenue | 1890 | |
| 514 East Oglethorpe Avenue | Greene Ward | | 514 East Oglethorpe Avenue | 1891 | |
| John McAuliffe (Estate of) Property | Greene Ward | | 552 East Oglethorpe Avenue | 1892 | |
| Thomas Williams House | Greene Ward | | 503 East President Street | 1799-1808 (between) | |
| Anthony Mira House | Greene Ward | | 505 East President Street | 1853 | |
| Mary Cullum Property | Greene Ward | | 546-548 East President Street | 1897 | |
| Anderson Row | Greene Ward | | 502-512 East State Street | 1890 | |
| Ann Rossiter House | Greene Ward | | 520 East State Street | 1900 | |
| John Dorsett House | Greene Ward | | 536 East State Street (formerly at 422 Hull Street) | 1845 | Savannah's smallest free-standing house |
| 538 East State Street | Greene Ward | | 538 East State Street | 1818 | |
| William Wall House | Greene Ward | | 542 East State Street | 1818 (circa) | Built for William Wall, Free Man of Color |
| Joseph Burke House | Greene Ward | | 550 East State Street | 1854 | |
| Deitrich Oetjen House | Greene Ward | | 503 East York Street | 1897 | |
| William Herman Duplex | Greene Ward | | 506-508 East York Street | 1902 | |
| Frederick Heineman Property (1) | Greene Ward | | 509 East York Street | 1839 (circa) | |
| George Jones House | Greene Ward | | 510 East York Street | 1799-1808 (between) | |
| Teresa Neve House | Greene Ward | | 511 East York Street | 1855 | |
| Catherine Deveaux House | Greene Ward | | 513 East York Street | 1853 | Built for Catherine Deveaux, Free Woman of Color. Run as a school by Catherine and daughter. |
| Susannah Clarke Cottage | Greene Ward | | 517 East York Street | 1801-1808 (between) | |
| Edward White Cottage | Greene Ward | | 519 East York Street | 1812 (circa) | |
| Margaret McDonald House | Greene Ward | | 521 East York Street | 1883 | |
| James King House | Greene Ward | | 113 Houston Street | 1854 | |
| Henry Cunningham House | Greene Ward | | 117–119 Houston Street | 1810 (by) | Built for Henry Cunningham, Free Man of Color. By 1812 site of the Savannah Female Asylum |
| Second African Baptist Church | Greene Ward | | 123 Houston Street | 1926 | Congregation founded on the same site 1802 |
| 124 Houston Street | Greene Ward | | 124 Houston Street | 1814-1816 | By Isaiah Davenport; considerably reduced in size compared to the photograph |
| Jeremiah Murphy House | Greene Ward | | 129 Houston Street | 1904 | |
| 131 Houston Street | Greene Ward | | 131 Houston Street | 1807 | |
| 134–142 Houston Street | Greene Ward | | 134–142 Houston Street | 1926 (circa) | The Kate Baldwin Free Kindergarten operated between 1899 and 1943, standing building second on site |
| Frederick Heineman Property (2) | Greene Ward | | 140 Price Street | 1828 (circa) | |
| 146-148 Price Street | Greene Ward | | 146-148 Price Street | 1890-1898 (between) | |
| 150-152 Price Street | Greene Ward | | 150-152 Price Street | 1890 | |
| 416 West Liberty Street | Elbert Ward | | 416 West Liberty Street | 1902 | |
| Wetter House (demolished) | Elbert Ward | | 425 West Oglethorpe Avenue | 1822 | Demolished in 1950 |
| Harper Fowlkes House | Jackson Ward | | 230 Barnard Street | 1844/1895 | Also known as the Champion–McAlpin–Fowlkes House, by Charles B. Cluskey |
| John Ash House | Jackson Ward | | 114–116 West Hull Street | 1817 | |
| Lodiska Richards House | Jackson Ward | | 114 West Liberty Street | 1841 | Remodeled with mansard roof in 1897 |
| Solomon Cohen Row House (eastern portion) | Jackson Ward | | 116-118 West Liberty Street | 1875 | |
| Solomon Cohen Row House (western portion) | Jackson Ward | | 120-124 West Liberty Street | 1851 | See additional Solomon Cohen properties (Derby Ward, Pulaski Ward, Stephens Ward & Troup Ward) |
| Stephen B. Williams House Inn | Jackson Ward | | 128 West Liberty Street | 1835 | Formerly Liberty Café |
| 101 West Oglethorpe Avenue | Jackson Ward | | 101 West Oglethorpe Avenue | 1923 | |
| Thomas Gardner–Jacob Henry Duplex | Jackson Ward | | 115-117 West Oglethorpe Avenue | 1820 | Top story added c.1853 |
| Samuel Bryant House | Jackson Ward | | 123 West Oglethorpe Avenue | 1820 | Moved from 122 to 123 West Oglethorpe (across the street), 1980s |
| Downtowner Motor Inn | Jackson Ward | | 201 West Oglethorpe Avenue | 1964 | Since 1988 Oglethorpe House, SCAD |
| Frederick Tebeau House | Jackson Ward | | 101 West Perry Street | 1836/1876 | Remodeled 1876; moved from 16 West Liberty Street, 1980s |
| John Martin–A.J. Miller Duplex | Jackson Ward | | 105-107 West Perry Street | 1872 | By DeWitt Bruyn |
| Laura Mehrtens House | Jackson Ward | | 109 West Perry Street | 1904 | |
| Mordecai Myers House | Jackson Ward | | 111 West Perry Street | 1833 | Built for Mordecai Myers; third floor added c.1880 |
| Henry Hayme Duplex | Jackson Ward | | 113-115 West Perry Street | 1887 | By Calvin Fay & Alfred Eichberg |
| John Morel Property | Jackson Ward | | 117-119 West Perry Street | 1818 | Remodeled 1875 |
| Alfred Haywood Property (1) | Brown Ward | | 217-219 Abercorn Street | 1872-1873 | Built for Alfred Haywood |
| Ramon Molina House | Brown Ward | | 223 Abercorn Street | 1869 | |
| Independent Presbyterian Church | Brown Ward | | 207 Bull Street | 1819/1891 | By John Holden Greene; gutted in the 1889 fire, rebuilt 1891 |
| Independent Presbyterian Church School Building | Brown Ward | | 207 Bull Street | 1894 | By Charles Henry |
| Board of Education Building, western half | Brown Ward | | 208 Bull Street (Bull Street facade) | 1908-1910 | |
| Board of Education Building, eastern half | Brown Ward | | 208 Bull Street (Oglethorpe Avenue facade) | 1899-1908 | |
| The Savannah Theatre | Brown Ward | | 222 Bull Street | 1820 | By William Jay (original structure) |
| First Baptist Church | Brown Ward | | 223 Bull Street | 1833/1922 | |
| Julius Koox Duplex | Brown Ward | | 230-232 Bull Street | 1871 | |
| 234 Bull Street | Brown Ward | | 234 Bull Street | 1900 (circa) | |
| 240 Bull Street | Brown Ward | | 240 Bull Street | 1890 | |
| 244-252 Bull Street | Brown Ward | | 244-252 Bull Street | 1856 | |
| Charles Mills House | Brown Ward | | 2-4 East Liberty Street | 1856 | |
| Drayton Arms Apartments | Brown Ward | | 102 East Liberty Street | 1951 | On the NRHP |
| James J. Joyce Property | Brown Ward | | 120 East Liberty Street | 1884 | Upper levels added 1912 |
| Alfred Haywood Property (2) | Brown Ward | | 124 East McDonough Street | 1861 | Built for Alfred Haywood |
| John Hunter Duplex | Brown Ward | | 101-105 East Oglethorpe Avenue | 1821-1822 | Joseph E. Johnston lived at 105 between 1868 and 1876 |
| Thomas Clark–Matthew Lufburrow Duplex | Brown Ward | | 107-109 East Oglethorpe Avenue | 1821-1822 | |
| Anna Buntz House | Brown Ward | | 111 East Oglethorpe Avenue | 1883 | |
| John Haupt House | Brown Ward | | 113 East Oglethorpe Avenue | 1819 | House raised 1867; side porch added 1884 |
| Savannah Fire Department | Brown Ward | | 121 East Oglethorpe Avenue | 1937 | |
| Hetty, Abbie & Phillipa Minis House | Brown Ward | | 11 East Perry Street | 1820 (circa) | |
| Honora Foley Property ("Foley House Inn") | Brown Ward | | 14 West Hull Street | 1896 | By Henry C. Urban |
| Louis Knorr Property | Brown Ward | | 16 West Hull Street | 1869 | Bay window added 1893 |
| John Scudder Property (1) | Brown Ward | | 18 West Hull Street | 1857 | By John Scudder; bay window added 1885 |
| John Scudder Property (2) | Brown Ward | | 20 West Hull Street | 1858 | See additional John Scudder Properties (Monterey Ward) |
| Julius Perlinski House | Brown Ward | | 22 West Hull Street | 1903 (circa) | |
| Henry Brigham Building | Brown Ward | | 4 West Liberty Street | 1879 | By Francis Grimball |
| Pierce Condon House | Brown Ward | | 10 West Liberty Street | 1871 | |
| Philbrick–Eastman House | Brown Ward | | 17 West McDonough Street | 1844/1911 | By Charles B. Cluskey |
| 3 West Perry Street | Brown Ward | | 3 West Perry Street | 1831/1874 | Formerly the home of James Johnston Waring and his grandson Joseph Frederick Waring |
| John Stoddard House | Brown Ward | | 15 West Perry Street | 1867 | Home of Fleming Grantland DuBignon in the 1880s |
| Stoddard Row | Brown Ward | | 19-25 West Perry Street | 1854-1855 | By John Stoddard |
| 237-239 East Broad Street | Crawford Ward | | 237-239 East Broad Street | 1890 | |
| 241-243 East Broad Street | Crawford Ward | | 241-243 East Broad Street | 1895 | |
| 245-247 East Broad Street | Crawford Ward | | 245-247 East Broad Street | 1883 | |
| Augustus Barié Property (1) | Crawford Ward | | 202 East Liberty Street | 1869 | See also Augustus Barié Properties (Calhoun Ward, Lafayette Ward, Troup Ward) |
| John Hernandez Property (1) | Crawford Ward | | 206 East Liberty Street | 1869-1870 | |
| John Hernandez Property (2) | Crawford Ward | | 208 East Liberty Street | 1868 | See additional John Hernandez properties (Troup Ward) |
| Sarah Frierson House | Crawford Ward | | 210 East Liberty Street | 1869 | |
| Laurence Connell Property (1) | Crawford Ward | | 212 East Liberty Street | 1851-1852 | Remodeled 1880 |
| Laurence Connell Property (2) | Crawford Ward | | 214 East Liberty Street | 1851-1852 | |
| George Willet Duplex | Crawford Ward | | 218-220 East Liberty Street | 1850 | |
| Augustus Barié Property (2) | Crawford Ward | | 222-224 East Liberty Street | 1859 | |
| Jane Lama House | Crawford Ward | | 306 East Liberty Street | 1870 (circa) | |
| Harriet Dennis House | Crawford Ward | | 308 East Liberty Street | 1853 | Dormers & balcony added in 1960s |
| Bernard Goode House | Crawford Ward | | 310 East Liberty Street | 1894 | |
| Thomas Ballentine House | Crawford Ward | | 312 East Liberty Street | 1870 | |
| John Lubs Property | Crawford Ward | | 318-322 East Liberty Street | 1895 | |
| Nicholas & Mary Jones Row House | Crawford Ward | | 402-412 East Liberty Street | 1882-1883 | |
| Avelle Goerz Row House | Crawford Ward | | 414-424 East Liberty Street | 1871 | |
| Cord Asendorf Property | Crawford Ward | | 556 East Liberty Street / 251 East Broad Street | 1883 | See also Cord Asendorf Properties (Stephens Ward, Wesley Ward) |
| 501 East McDonough Street | Crawford Ward | | 501 East McDonough Street | 1890 | |
| 505-507 East McDonough Street | Crawford Ward | | 505-507 East McDonough Street | 1851 | |
| 548-550 East McDonough Street | Crawford Ward | | 548-550 East McDonough Street | 1870 | |
| City Police Barracks | Crawford Ward | | 323 East Oglethorpe Avenue | 1869-1870 | |
| James Roberts Row House | Crawford Ward | | 517-523 East Perry Street | 1871 | |
| Robert Lawton Duplex | Crawford Ward | | 228-232 Habersham Street | 1844 | |
| Maggie Ritchie House | Crawford Ward | | 234 Habersham Street | 1890 | |
| 1887 County Jail | Crawford Ward | | 235-239 Habersham Street | 1887 | Designed by McDonald Brothers; part of SCAD |
| 216-222 Houston Street | Crawford Ward | | 216-222 Houston Street | 1910 | |
| John Tucker Property | Crawford Ward | | 224 Houston Street | 1850 | |
| Stewart Austin Row House | Crawford Ward | | 234-244 Price Street | 1855 | |
| Patrick Whelan Property | Currie Town Ward | | 317-319 Tattnall Street | 1869 | |
| William Van Vorst House | Currie Town Ward | | 327 Tattnall Street | 1878 | By Benjamin Armstrong |
| Eliza LaRoche Property | Currie Town Ward | | 333-335 Tattnall Street | 1852-1853 | |
| James Collins Property | Currie Town Ward | | 337-339 Tattnall Street | 1895 | |
| John Low House | Currie Town Ward | | 347-349 Tattnall Street | 1844 | |
| William McCullough Property | Currie Town Ward | | 301-303 West Harris Street | 1895 | |
| William Mell Property | Currie Town Ward | | 309 West Harris Street | 1847 | |
| Sarah Mell Property | Currie Town Ward | | 311 West Harris Street | 1883 | |
| Bernard Constantine Property (1) | Pulaski Ward | | 321 Barnard Street | 1845 | |
| JEA Building | Pulaski Ward | | 328 Barnard Street | 1914 | |
| Israel Dasher House | Pulaski Ward | | 331 Barnard Street | 1844 | See also Israel Dasher House (Chatham Ward) |
| Anthony and Mary Basler Property | Pulaski Ward | | 344 Barnard Street | 1890 | |
| 109 West Charlton Street | Pulaski Ward | | 109 West Charlton Street | 1915 | |
| Hill Gordy House | Pulaski Ward | | 111 West Charlton Street | 1864-1865 | Street facade blocked up 1965 |
| George Walker House | Pulaski Ward | | 117 West Charlton Street | 1904 | |
| William Adams House | Pulaski Ward | | 123 West Charlton Street | 1843 | Third story added later |
| Celia Solomons Duplex | Pulaski Ward | | 201-203 West Charlton Street | 1854-1856 | |
| Moses Cohen House | Pulaski Ward | | 215 West Charlton Street | 1846 | By John Sturdevant |
| 106 West Harris Street | Pulaski Ward | | 106 West Harris Street | 1847 | |
| Battersby Tenements | Pulaski Ward | | 108-110 West Harris Street | 1871 | |
| David Turner Property | Pulaski Ward | | 116 West Harris Street | 1846 | |
| John Gammel Duplex | Pulaski Ward | | 118-120 West Harris Street | 1884 | |
| Theodosius Bartow House | Pulaski Ward | | 126 West Harris Street | 1839 | Third story added later |
| Georgia LaRoche Duplex (eastern portion) | Pulaski Ward | | 208 West Harris Street | 1855 | |
| Georgia LaRoche Duplex (western portion) | Pulaski Ward | | 210 West Harris Street | 1848 | |
| Isaac LaRoche Duplex | Pulaski Ward | | 212-214 West Harris Street | 1868 | |
| Bernard Constantine Property (2) | Pulaski Ward | | 218 West Harris Street | 1839 | |
| William Remshart Row House (102-104 West Jones facade) | Pulaski Ward | | 102-104 West Jones Street | 1853 | |
| William Remshart Row House (106 West Jones facade) | Pulaski Ward | | 106 West Jones Street | 1853 | |
| William Remshart Row House (108 West Jones facade) | Pulaski Ward | | 108 West Jones Street | 1853 | |
| William Remshart Row House (110-112 West Jones facade) | Pulaski Ward | | 110-112 West Jones Street | 1853 | |
| John Murchison Property | Pulaski Ward | | 114-116 West Jones Street | 1851 | |
| C. D. Rogers House | Pulaski Ward | | 120 West Jones Street | 1871 | |
| Jesse Mount House | Pulaski Ward | | 122-124 West Jones Street | 1852 | Recessed western wing added 1857 |
| Anthony Basler Row House | Pulaski Ward | | 128-132 West Jones Street | 1851 | |
| Solomon Cohen (Estate of) Property | Pulaski Ward | | 208-210 West Jones Street | 1886 | See additional Solomon Cohen properties (Derby Ward, Jackson Ward, Stephens Ward & Troup Ward) |
| Elizabeth, Isaac & Jacob Cohen House | Pulaski Ward | | 212 West Jones Street | 1852 | Mansard roof added 1872 |
| Sarah Krenson Duplex | Pulaski Ward | | 214-216 West Jones Street | 1873 | By Grimball and Chaplin |
| William Humphries House | Pulaski Ward | | 218 West Jones Street | 1852 | |
| Lewis Bird House | Pulaski Ward | | 201-205 West Liberty Street | 1838 | Altered 1860 |
| Charles Groover Duplex | Pulaski Ward | | 107-109 West Liberty Street | 1870-1871 | |
| Benjamin Purse Property | Pulaski Ward | | 311 Whitaker Street | 1885 | |
| Julia Tucker Property | Pulaski Ward | | 333-335 Whitaker Street | 1852 | Adam Short, builder; remodeled 1894 |
| 339 Whitaker Street | Pulaski Ward | | 339 Whitaker Street | 1910 | |
| St John's Episcopal Church | Jasper Ward | | 325 Bull Street | 1853 | |
| Eliza Ann Jewett Property (1) | Jasper Ward | | 326 Bull Street | 1843 | |
| Masonic Temple | Jasper Ward | | 341 Bull Street | 1912 | Now the Gryphon Tea Room, by Freemason Hyman W. Witcover |
| Savannah Volunteer Guards Armory (Poetter Hall) | Jasper Ward | | 340-344 Bull Street | 1893 | By William G. Preston |
| Alexander A. Smets House | Jasper Ward | | 2-4 East Jones Street | 1853 | Built for Alexander Smets; now SCAD's Morris Hall, by John S. Norris |
| Jacob Cohen Property | Jasper Ward | | 10-14 East Jones Street | 1889 | |
| "Joe Odom House" | Jasper Ward | | 16 East Jones Street | 1847 | Built for Eliza Ann Jewett; windows and door altered |
| Eliza Ann Jewett Property (2) | Jasper Ward | | 18 East Jones Street | 1847 | |
| Eliza Ann Jewett (Estate of) Property | Jasper Ward | | 20-22 East Jones Street | 1861 | |
| John Howell House | Jasper Ward | | 24 East Jones Street | 1858 | Balcony added 1875 |
| Hilton Savannah DeSoto (demolished) | Jasper Ward | | 15 East Liberty Street | 1889-1890 | By William G. Preston. Demolished 1966. Site today of the 1968 DeSoto Hilton |
| Daniel Purse Row House | Jasper Ward | | 5-9 West Charlton Street | 1879 | By Francis Grimball |
| Daniel Robertson Property (1) | Jasper Ward | | 11-17 West Charlton Street | 1852-1853 | |
| Daniel Robertson Property (2) | Jasper Ward | | 19 West Charlton Street | 1857 | |
| Daniel Robertson Property (3) | Jasper Ward | | 23-25 West Charlton Street | 1845 | |
| Sorrel–Weed House | Jasper Ward | | 6 West Harris Street | 1839-1841 | By Charles B. Cluskey |
| Francis Sorrel Property | Jasper Ward | | 12 West Harris Street | 1856 | |
| Eugenia & Louisa Kerr Duplex | Jasper Ward | | 14-18 West Harris Street | 1842-1843 | Attributed to Charles B. Cluskey |
| Eliza Ann Jewett Property (3) | Jasper Ward | | 20-22 West Harris Street | 1842-1843 | |
| John Gallie Property | Jasper Ward | | 26 West Harris Street | 1840 | |
| Eliza Ann Jewett Row House (Jasper Ward) | Jasper Ward | | 18-24 East Macon Street | 1852-1853 | See also Eliza Ann Jewett Row Houses (Calhoun Ward, Lafayette Ward) |
| Noah B. Knapp House | Jasper Ward | | 10 West Jones Street | 1857 | By John S. Norris |
| Morris Sternberg House | Jasper Ward | | 12-14 West Jones Street | 1891 | By Alfred Eichberg |
| James Kerr House | Jasper Ward | | 20 West Jones Street | 1849 | Third story added in 1878 |
| Joseph Fay House | Jasper Ward | | 1-3 West Liberty Street | 1849 | Now Knights of Columbus Headquarters, by John S. Norris |
| Green–Meldrim House | Jasper Ward | | 14 West Macon Street | 1850-1853 | By John S. Norris, on the NRHP |
| 307-311 Abercorn Street | Lafayette Ward | | 307-311 Abercorn Street | 1914 | |
| 319 Abercorn Street | Lafayette Ward | | 319 Abercorn Street | 1888 | |
| Andrew Low House | Lafayette Ward | | 329 Abercorn Street | 1848-1849 | By John S. Norris, on the NRHP |
| Original Girl Scout Headquarters (Andrew Low House carriage house) | Lafayette Ward | | 329 Abercorn Street, rear (view from Drayton Street) | 1849 (circa) | Juliette Gordon Low's original 1912 meeting site for the Girl Scouts of the USA |
| Samuel P. Hamilton House | Lafayette Ward | | 330 Abercorn Street | 1873 | Now Hamilton–Turner Inn, built for Samuel Pugh Hamilton, jeweler and president of the Brush Electric Company |
| 340 Abercorn Street | Lafayette Ward | | 340 Abercorn Street | 1903 | |
| Henrietta Cohen Property | Lafayette Ward | | 312-14 Drayton Street | 1882 | Host to "Pinkie Masters" |
| Battersby–Hartridge–Anderson House | Lafayette Ward | | 119 East Charlton Street | 1852 | A rare Charleston single house-style in Savannah |
| John B. Gallie House | Lafayette Ward | | 201-203 East Charlton Street | 1858 | By John S. Norris |
| Flannery O'Connor Childhood Home | Lafayette Ward | | 207 East Charlton Street | 1856 | |
| Catherine McMahon House | Lafayette Ward | | 211 East Charlton Street | 1853 | By John Scudder |
| Fitzgerald Pelot Duplex | Lafayette Ward | | 221-223 East Charlton Street | 1854-1855 | 221 later altered |
| Octavus Cohen Property | Lafayette Ward | | 104 East Harris Street | 1875 | |
| Centurian House | Lafayette Ward | | 106 East Harris Street | 1903 | Built for Simon P. Kehoe |
| 108 East Harris Street | Lafayette Ward | | 108 East Harris Street | 1857 | |
| Wallace Cumming Property | Lafayette Ward | | 112 East Harris Street | 1871 | |
| Joseph Gammon Property | Lafayette Ward | | 118-124 East Harris Street | 1852 | |
| Cathedral of St. John the Baptist | Lafayette Ward | | 222 East Harris Street | 1873-1876 | Spires added in 1896 |
| David Cohen House | Lafayette Ward | | 108 East Jones Street | 1853 | |
| Eliza Ann Jewett Row (112 East Jones facade) | Lafayette Ward | | 112 East Jones Street | 1852 | |
| Eliza Ann Jewett Row (114 East Jones facade) | Lafayette Ward | | 114 East Jones Street | 1852 | |
| Eliza Ann Jewett Row (116 East Jones facade) | Lafayette Ward | | 116 East Jones Street | 1852 | |
| Eliza Ann Jewett Row (118 East Jones facade) | Lafayette Ward | | 118 East Jones Street | 1852 | |
| Eliza Ann Jewett Row (120 East Jones facade) | Lafayette Ward | | 120 East Jones Street | 1852 | See also Eliza Ann Jewett Row Houses (Calhoun Ward, Jasper Ward) |
| Mary Grimball House | Lafayette Ward | | 124 East Jones Street | 1850 | |
| Abram Minis House | Lafayette Ward | | 204 East Jones Street | 1859-1860 | By Stephen Decatur Button |
| James Snider House | Lafayette Ward | | 208 East Jones Street | 1856 | Cornices & veranda added 1877 |
| Mary Perry Row House | Lafayette Ward | | 212-218 East Jones Street | 1853 | |
| Augustus Barié Property (Lafayette Ward) | Lafayette Ward | | 222 East Jones Street | 1857 | See also Augustus Barié Properties (Calhoun Ward, Crawford Ward, Troup Ward) |
| Jacob Quint Property | Lafayette Ward | | 125-129 East Liberty Street | 1871 | |
| St. Vincent's Academy | Lafayette Ward | | 207 East Liberty Street | 1845/1869 | By Charles B. Cluskey |
| Charles Lampe Duplex (eastern half) | Troup Ward | | 301 East Charlton Street | 1855 | |
| Charles Lampe Duplex (western half) | Troup Ward | | 305 East Charlton Street | 1855 | |
| Mary Edmundson House | Troup Ward | | 311 East Charlton Street | 1873 | |
| Lewis Cook Duplex | Troup Ward | | 313-315 East Charlton Street | 1852-1853 | |
| Michael McQuade House | Troup Ward | | 317 East Charlton Street | 1883 | |
| John Kenney House | Troup Ward | | 319 East Charlton Street | 1870 | Entrance later reoriented to Habersham Street |
| Mortimer Williams House | Troup Ward | | 401 East Charlton Street | 1860 | |
| Dale Row (Troup Ward) | Troup Ward | | 405-411 East Charlton Street | 1882 | See also Dale Row (Stephens Ward) & Dale–Wells Row House (Calhoun Ward) |
| McDonough Row | Troup Ward | | 410-424 East Charlton Street | 1882 | |
| George Haslam House | Troup Ward | | 417 East Charlton Street | 1872 | |
| Henry Bragdon–Edward Segur Duplex | Troup Ward | | 419-421 East Charlton Street | 1868 | |
| Ellen Williams House | Troup Ward | | 423 East Charlton Street | 1867 | |
| Frances Threadcroaft Duplex | Troup Ward | | 301-307 East Harris Street | 1868 | |
| Sarah Coombs Property | Troup Ward | | 309-311 East Harris Street | 1862-1863 | |
| Parsonage (formerly St. Stephens, now Unitarian Universalist) | Troup Ward | | 313 East Harris Street | 1870 | |
| John McDonough Property | Troup Ward | | 322-326 East Harris Street | 1869 | |
| John Schwarz House | Troup Ward | | 302-306 East Jones Street | 1890 | |
| Eliza McCormack House | Troup Ward | | 308 East Jones Street | 1898 | |
| John Richardson Duplex (western half) | Troup Ward | | 316 East Jones Street | 1852 | |
| John Richardson Duplex (eastern half) | Troup Ward | | 318 East Jones Street | 1852 | |
| J.J. Dale Duplex (western half) | Troup Ward | | 408 East Jones Street | 1883 | By William Noonan |
| J.J. Dale Duplex (eastern half) | Troup Ward | | 410 East Jones Street | 1883 | See also J.J. Dale Duplex (Wesley Ward), across the street |
| John Asendorf Property (west) | Troup Ward | | 418 East Jones Street | 1863 | |
| John Asendorf Property (east) | Troup Ward | | 420-424 East Jones Street | 1867 | |
| James Skinner House | Troup Ward | | 303 East Liberty Street | 1852 | |
| Margaret Garrity House | Troup Ward | | 305-307 East Liberty Street | 1893 | |
| George Ash Duplex (western half) | Troup Ward | | 309 East Liberty Street | 1852-53 | |
| George Ash Duplex (eastern half) | Troup Ward | | 313 East Liberty Street | 1852-53 | See also George Ash properties (Calhoun Ward, Wesley Ward) |
| McDonough–Hamlet Duplex | Troup Ward | | 315-317 East Liberty Street | 1869 | |
| Victoria Barié House | Troup Ward | | 319-321 East Liberty Street | 1868 | |
| Augustus Barié Property (Troup Ward) | Troup Ward | | 327 East Liberty Street | 1892-1893 | See also Augustus Barié Properties (Calhoun Ward, Crawford Ward, Lafayette Ward) |
| John Hernandez Property (1) | Troup Ward | | 401 East Liberty Street | 1855 | |
| John Cercopely House | Troup Ward | | 405 East Liberty Street | 1853 | |
| John Walz Property | Troup Ward | | 409 East Liberty Street | 1910 | John Walz (1844-1922), sculptor |
| Troup Trust | Troup Ward | | 410-424 East Macon Street | 1872 (418-424); 1885 (410-416) | Four units to east built for John McDonough (1872), four units to west built for Edward Kennedy (1885) |
| John Hernandez Property (2) | Troup Ward | | 310 Habersham Street | 1861 | See additional John Hernandez properties (Crawford Ward) |
| Cohen Row | Troup Ward | | 312-320 Habersham Street | 1883 | See additional Solomon Cohen properties (Derby Ward, Jackson Ward, Pulaski Ward & Stephens Ward) |
| Unitarian Universalist Church (formerly St. Stephens) | Troup Ward | | 321 Habersham Street | 1851 | Also known as the "Jingle Bells" Church (its musical director was James Pierpont); structure transported to Troup Ward from Anson Ward in 1860 |
| John Staley Duplex | Troup Ward | | 346-348 Lincoln Street | 1852-1853 | |
| 325-329 East Broad Street | Bartow Ward | | 325-329 East Broad Street | 1871 | |
| Henry Kuck/John Asendorf Commercial Property | Bartow Ward | | 341-343 East Broad Street | 1876 | |
| 345 East Broad Street | Bartow Ward | | 345 East Broad Street | 1876 | |
| 355 East Broad Street | Bartow Ward | | 355 East Broad Street | 1890 | |
| Noble Hardee & E.D. Myers Duplex | Bartow Ward | | 501-503 East Charlton Street | 1853 | Remodeled 1868 |
| Samuel Garey Property | Bartow Ward | | 509 East Charlton Street | 1860 | |
| Lucy Sabttie Property | Bartow Ward | | 511 East Charlton Street | 1865 | |
| Prince Rogers Property (west) | Bartow Ward | | 537 East Charlton Street | 1869 | |
| Prince Rogers Property (east) | Bartow Ward | | 539 East Charlton Street | 1869 | |
| James Cann Property (1) | Bartow Ward | | 543 East Charlton Street | 1866 | |
| The Beach Institute/Freedman's School | Bartow Ward | | 502 East Harris Street | 1867 | Erected by the American Missionary Association as a school for Savannah's African-American community; today a heritage center & museum |
| James Cann Property (2) | Bartow Ward | | 513-515 East Harris Street | 1872 | |
| Anna Whitesides Duplex (western half) | Bartow Ward | | 516 East Harris Street | 1885 | |
| Anna Whitesides Duplex (eastern half) | Bartow Ward | | 518 East Harris Street | 1885 | |
| John & Estelle Savage Property (1) | Bartow Ward | | 519 East Harris Street | 1889 | John B. Savage, born in Savannah a Free Man of Color |
| John & Estelle Savage Property (2) | Bartow Ward | | 521 East Harris Street | 1875 | Siblings Estelle (c.1814-1891) and John (c.1817-1895) born Free Persons; see also mother Phillis' property (Berrien Ward) |
| Joseph Gally Tenement | Bartow Ward | | 523-525 East Harris Street | 1867 | |
| Ellen Monahan Property | Bartow Ward | | 524-526 East Harris Street | 1885 | |
| Noble Hardee Tenement (1) | Bartow Ward | | 543-545 East Harris Street | 1861 | In addition to his mansion on Monterey Square, Noble Hardee owned various lower-income rentals in this Beach Institute Neighborhood |
| Noble Hardee Tenement (2) | Bartow Ward | | 549-551 East Harris Street | 1861 | |
| Noble Hardee Tenement (3) | Bartow Ward | | 555-557 East Harris Street | 1863 | |
| James Cann Property (commercial half) | Bartow Ward | | 502 East Jones Street | 1861 | |
| James Cann Property (residential half) | Bartow Ward | | 504 East Jones Street | 1861 | |
| Robert Low Property (1) | Bartow Ward | | 510 East Jones Street | 1870 | |
| Robert Low Property (2) | Bartow Ward | | 512 East Jones Street | 1867 | |
| Abraham Backer Duplex | Bartow Ward | | 514-516 East Jones Street | 1867 | |
| George Bulloch & Cyrus Campfield Property | Bartow Ward | | 520-522 East Jones Street | 1867 | |
| Anna Bella Robertson Property | Bartow Ward | | 530-534 East Jones Street | 1885 | |
| Thomas Ford Property (1) | Bartow Ward | | 538 East Jones Street | 1871 | |
| Thomas Ford Property (2) | Bartow Ward | | 540 East Jones Street | 1871 | |
| 322-328 Price Street | Bartow Ward | | 322-328 Price Street | 1870 | |
| Phillis Savage House | Berrien Ward | | 217 Alice Street | 1846 (circa) | Built for Phillis Savage, Free Woman of Color; foundation raised by daughter Estelle 1853; see also John and Estelle's properties (Bartow Ward) |
| Solomon Ziegler Property | Berrien Ward | | 311 Berrien Street | 1852 | See also Solomon Ziegler House (Chatham Ward) |
| Michael Gay Property (northern portion) | Berrien Ward | | 419 Montgomery Street | 1854 | |
| Michael Gay Property (middle portion) | Berrien Ward | | 421-423 Montgomery Street | 1854 | |
| Michael Gay Property (southern portion) | Berrien Ward | | 425-427 Montgomery Street | 1855 | |
| Milton Cooper Property | Berrien Ward | | 403-405 Tattnall Street | 1878 | |
| 425-431 Tattnall Street | Berrien Ward | | 425-431 Tattnall Street | 1902 | |
| Jeremiah McCrohan House | Berrien Ward | | 433 Tattnall Street | 1872 | |
| John Ferrell & Oliver Lillibridge Property | Berrien Ward | | 435-437 Tattnall Street | 1854-1855 | |
| Benjamin & Mary Ferrell Tenement Row | Berrien Ward | | 215-219 West Taylor Street | 1852 | |
| William Kine Property | Chatham Ward | | 419-425 Barnard Street | 1854 | |
| William Bradley House | Chatham Ward | | 424 Barnard Street | 1859 | |
| William Bradley Commercial Property | Chatham Ward | | 426 Barnard Street | 1868 | |
| Dasher Row | Chatham Ward | | 433-441 Barnard Street | 1882 | By William Chaplin Jr. |
| Blues Range | Chatham Ward | | 443-455 Barnard Street | 1852 | |
| Thomas White Property | Chatham Ward | | 414 Tattnall Street | 1853 | |
| John Heitman Property (1) | Chatham Ward | | 444-448 Tattnall Street | 1883 | |
| Thomas Holcombe House | Chatham Ward | | 104 West Gaston Street | 1856 | Now administrative offices for the Georgia Historical Society |
| Nathan Brown House | Chatham Ward | | 110 West Gaston Street | 1874 | Side piazza added 1898 |
| George Cubbedge Property (east) | Chatham Ward | | 112 West Gaston Street | 1853 | Cubbedge was the owner of an oil company |
| George Cubbage Property (west) | Chatham Ward | | 114 West Gaston Street | 1853 | Mansard roof added 1875 |
| Gustavus Holcombe Property (east) | Chatham Ward | | 116 West Gaston Street | 1852 | |
| Gustavus Holcombe Property (west) | Chatham Ward | | 118 West Gaston Street | 1852 | |
| Israel Dasher House | Chatham Ward | | 124 West Gaston Street | 1858 | See also Israel Dasher House (Pulaski Ward) |
| Elizabeth Russell Property | Chatham Ward | | 208-210 West Gaston Street | 1855 | |
| John Heitman Property (2) | Chatham Ward | | 214-218 West Gaston Street | 1879-1883 | |
| Elizabeth Russell Tenement | Chatham Ward | | 206-208 West Gordon Lane | 1851 | |
| Gordon Row | Chatham Ward | | 101-129 West Gordon Street | 1854 | |
| Thomas McArthur Duplex | Chatham Ward | | 205-207 West Gordon Street | 1853 | By William Chaplin Jr. |
| Matilda Heitman Property (east) | Chatham Ward | | 209 West Gordon Street | 1895 | |
| Matilda Heitman Property (middle) | Chatham Ward | | 211 West Gordon Street | 1895 | |
| Matilda Heitman Property (west) | Chatham Ward | | 213 West Gordon Street | 1895 | |
| Algernon Hartridge Duplex | Chatham Ward | | 105-107 West Jones Street | 1869 | Since 1943 site of Mrs. Wilkes' Boarding House/Dining Room |
| Mary Johnson House | Chatham Ward | | 109 West Jones Street | 1900 | |
| Caroline Overstreet House | Chatham Ward | | 111 West Jones Street | 1855 | |
| Louisa Nevitt Row House | Chatham Ward | | 113-117 West Jones Street | 1851 | |
| Solomon Zeigler House | Chatham Ward | | 121 West Jones Street | 1856 | Top story added 1885; see also Solomon Ziegler Property (Berrien Ward) |
| Isaac Brunner Property (1) | Chatham Ward | | 203 West Jones Street | 1852 | |
| Isaac Brunner Property (2) | Chatham Ward | | 205 West Jones Street | 1851 | |
| Jesse Mount Row House | Chatham Ward | | 207-209 West Jones Street | 1856 | |
| Bernard Constantine Duplex | Chatham Ward | | 211-215 West Jones Street | 1851 | |
| Meinhardt Row | Chatham Ward | | 101-107 West Taylor Street | 1871 | |
| Enoch Hendry Row House | Chatham Ward | | 108-112 West Taylor Street | 1851 | |
| Quantock Row (114 West Taylor facade) | Chatham Ward | | 114 West Taylor Street | 1852 | |
| Quantock Row (116 West Taylor facade) | Chatham Ward | | 116 West Taylor Street | 1852 | |
| Quantock Row (118 West Taylor facade) | Chatham Ward | | 118 West Taylor Street | 1852 | |
| Quantock Row (120 West Taylor facade) | Chatham Ward | | 120 West Taylor Street | 1852 | |
| Quantock Row (122 West Taylor facade) | Chatham Ward | | 122 West Taylor Street | 1852 | |
| Quantock Row (124 West Taylor facade) | Chatham Ward | | 124 West Taylor Street | 1852 | See also Quantock Row (Monterey Ward) |
| Edward Lovell Duplex | Chatham Ward | | 126-128 West Taylor Street | 1856 | See also Edward Lovell Properties (Decker Ward, Heathcote Ward & Percival Ward) |
| The Barnard Street School | Chatham Ward | | 212 West Taylor Street | 1901 | Now Pepe Hall, SCAD |
| Frederick Kuck Property | Chatham Ward | | 411-417 Whitaker Street | 1899 | |
| Charles W. Rogers Houses | Monterey Ward | | 423-425 Bull Street | 1858 | By John S. Norris; later the home of Lee and Emma Adler |
| Mercer–Williams House | Monterey Ward | | 429 Bull Street | 1871 | By John S. Norris, restored by James Arthur Williams |
| 440 Bull Street | Monterey Ward | | 440 Bull Street | 1900 | |
| Armstrong House | Monterey Ward | | 447 Bull Street | 1917-1919 | Now the Armstrong Kessler Mansion; formerly bought and restored by James Arthur Williams |
| Edmund Molyneux House | Monterey Ward | | 450 Bull Street | 1857 | By John S. Norris. Molyneux was consul at Savannah from 1832 to 1862. After the Civil War, the house was purchased by Henry R. Jackson. Now The Oglethorpe Club |
| Mills B. Lane House | Monterey Ward | | 26 East Gaston Street | 1909 | By Mowbray & Uffinger |
| Scudder's Row (1 East Gordon Street facade) | Monterey Ward | | 1 East Gordon Street | 1852-1853 | Built by John and Ephraim Scudder |
| Scudder's Row (3 East Gordon Street facade) | Monterey Ward | | 3 East Gordon Street | 1852-1853 | |
| Scudder's Row (5 East Gordon Street facade) | Monterey Ward | | 5 East Gordon Street | 1852-1853 | |
| Scudder's Row (7 East Gordon Street facade) | Monterey Ward | | 7 East Gordon Street | 1852-1853 | |
| Scudder's Row (9 East Gordon Street facade) | Monterey Ward | | 9 East Gordon Street | 1852-1853 | |
| 11 East Gordon Street | Monterey Ward | | 11 East Gordon Street | 1854 | |
| Charles McGill House | Monterey Ward | | 15 East Gordon Street | 1854 | |
| John Rowland House | Monterey Ward | | 17-19 East Gordon Street | 1881 | |
| Congregation Mickve Israel | Monterey Ward | | 20 East Gordon Street | 1876 | On the NRHP |
| Frederick Groschaud House | Monterey Ward | | 23 East Gordon Street | 1854 | Remodeled 1909 |
| Cornelia Millen House | Monterey Ward | | 7 East Jones Street | 1851 | Stoop replaced in 1908 |
| John Scudder Property (1) | Monterey Ward | | 11 East Jones Street | 1849-1851 | By John Scudder |
| John Scudder Property (2) | Monterey Ward | | 15 East Jones Street | 1849-1851 | See additional John Scudder Properties (Brown Ward) |
| Quantock Row (17 East Jones facade) | Monterey Ward | | 17 East Jones Street | 1854 | Brunner & Scudder builders |
| Quantock Row (19 East Jones facade) | Monterey Ward | | 19 East Jones Street | 1854 | |
| Quantock Row (21 East Jones facade) | Monterey Ward | | 21 East Jones Street | 1854 | |
| Quantock Row (27 East Jones facade) | Monterey Ward | | 27 East Jones Street | 1854 | |
| Quantock Row (31 East Jones facade) | Monterey Ward | | 31 East Jones Street | 1854 | See also Quantock Row (Chatham Ward) |
| Comer House | Monterey Ward | | 2 East Taylor Street | 1880 | Built for Hugh Moss Comer. Jefferson Davis was a guest in 1886 with his daughter Varina Anne Davis |
| William Hunter House | Monterey Ward | | 10 East Taylor Street | 1872 | |
| Thomas–Levy House (Thomas–Purse Duplex, west half) | Monterey Ward | | 12 East Taylor Street | 1869/1894 | Built for Daniel Remshaw Thomas |
| Daniel Purse House (Thomas–Purse Duplex, east half) | Monterey Ward | | 14 East Taylor Street | 1869 | Built for Daniel Gugel Purse Sr. |
| David Lopez Cohen Property (1) | Monterey Ward | | 16-20 East Taylor Street | 1852 | |
| David Lopez Cohen Property (2) | Monterey Ward | | 24 East Taylor Street | 1852 | |
| David Lopez Cohen Property (3) | Monterey Ward | | 28-32 East Taylor Street | 1852 | |
| William F. Brantley House | Monterey Ward | | 20 West Gaston Street | 1857 | By John S. Norris |
| George Gray House (Gray–Minis House) | Monterey Ward | | 24 West Gaston Street | 1862 | Altered 1871, 1874 & 1907 |
| Noble Hardee Mansion | Monterey Ward | | 3 West Gordon Street | 1860/1884 | See also Noble Hardee Tenements (Bartow Ward) |
| Mohr Brothers Duplex (eastern half) | Monterey Ward | | 7 West Gordon Street | 1884 | |
| Mohr Brothers Duplex (western half) | Monterey Ward | | 9 West Gordon Street | 1884 | |
| Charles B. King House | Monterey Ward | | 11 West Gordon Street | 1858 | By John S. Norris |
| John M. Williams Duplex | Monterey Ward | | 17-19 West Gordon Street | 1879-1882 | |
| Joachim Saussy House | Monterey Ward | | 23 West Gordon Street | 1870 | |
| Israel K. Tefft House | Monterey Ward | | 1 West Jones Street | 1849 | |
| Eliza Thompson House | Monterey Ward | | 5-7 West Jones Street | 1847 | Western portion added 1889 |
| Joseph Johnston Property | Monterey Ward | | 11 West Jones Street | 1854 | |
| Thomas Holcombe Property | Monterey Ward | | 15 West Jones Street | 1849 | |
| John M. Williams House | Monterey Ward | | 17 West Jones Street | 1883 | |
| Nicholas Cruger House | Monterey Ward | | 4 West Taylor Street | 1852 | Also known as the Charlton House; later work done by John C. Lebey |
| Hurn Museum of Contemporary Folk Art | Monterey Ward | | 10 West Taylor Street & carriage house | 1852 | Built for Edward G. Wilson; remodeled 1904 and 1916 |
| 12 West Taylor Street | Monterey Ward | | 12 West Taylor Street | 1868 | |
| Andrew Farie House | Monterey Ward | | 18 West Taylor Street | 1913 | |
| George Gray House | Monterey Ward | | 20 West Taylor Street | 1855 | Altered 1893 |
| Herman Kuhlman Duplex | Monterey Ward | | 22-24 West Taylor Street | 1851 | |
| 422 Whitaker Street | Monterey Ward | | 422 Whitaker Street | 1880 | |
| Sara Clark House | Calhoun Ward | | 421 Abercorn Street | 1859 | Additional level added 1894 |
| Easton Yonge House | Calhoun Ward | | 426 Abercorn Street | 1855 | By George Ash; side porch added 1909 |
| Wesley Monumental United Methodist Church | Calhoun Ward | | 429 Abercorn Street | 1875-1890 | By Dixon and Carson |
| John Mingledorff Property | Calhoun Ward | | 439 Abercorn Street | 1856 | |
| Benjamin Wilson House | Calhoun Ward | | 430 Abercorn Street | 1868 | |
| Mary C. Lane House ("Pink House Replica") | Calhoun Ward | | 102 East Gaston Street | 1927 | A replica of the Olde Pink House (23 Abercorn Street, Reynolds Ward) commissioned by Mary Comer Lane, mother of Mary Lane Morrison |
| J.J. Dale & David Wells Row House | Calhoun Ward | | 108-116 East Gaston Street | 1884 | See also J.J. Dale Row Houses (Stephens Ward & Troup Ward) |
| William Wade House | Calhoun Ward | | 120 East Gaston Street | 1883 | By John R. Hamlet. Wade was superintendent of the Savannah Cotton Press Association and president of the United Hydraulic Cotton Press Company |
| Granite Hall | Calhoun Ward | | 126 East Gaston Street | 1881 | Now part of SCAD. Formerly known as the Fred Hull House; by John M. Williams; formerly the meeting place of the Married Women's Card Club |
| Algernon Hartridge Row House | Calhoun Ward | | 202-206 East Gaston Street | 1868 | See also Algernon Hartridge Duplex (Chatham Ward) |
| Abraham Smith & Herman Traub Duplex | Calhoun Ward | | 208-210 East Gaston Street | 1891 | By Alfred Eichberg |
| Fred & Darwin Dull Duplex | Calhoun Ward | | 212-214 East Gaston Street | 1869 | Piazza added 1900 |
| Aaron Champion & George Freeman Duplex | Calhoun Ward | | 216-218 East Gaston Street | 1870 | |
| Robert Footman House ("Gastonian Inn") | Calhoun Ward | | 220 East Gaston Street | 1869 | Now the Gastonian Inn |
| Charles Hutchins House | Calhoun Ward | | 113 East Gordon Street | 1868 | Altered 1897 |
| Adolphus Gomm House | Calhoun Ward | | 115 East Gordon Street | 1869 | |
| John B. Berry House | Calhoun Ward | | 127 East Gordon Street | 1856 | Additions in 1882 |
| Massie Common School House | Calhoun Ward | | 201-213 East Gordon Street | 1855–1856 | By John S. Norris |
| John Guerrard Row House | Calhoun Ward | | 215-229 East Gordon Street | 1872 | Benjamin Armstrong, builder |
| Edward Purse Duplex | Calhoun Ward | | 220-222 East Gordon Street | 1856 | |
| 224 East Gordon Street | Calhoun Ward | | 224 East Gordon Street | 1856 | Former home of Jane Adair Wright |
| 233 East Gordon Street | Calhoun Ward | | 233 East Gordon Street | 1923 | |
| Flora Max House | Calhoun Ward | | 235 East Gordon Street | 1894 | R. J. Sullivan, builder |
| Thomas Davis House | Calhoun Ward | | 237 East Gordon Street | 1893 | |
| Hunter–Charlton House | Calhoun Ward | | 101 East Jones Street | 1870 | |
| Sarah Gazan House | Calhoun Ward | | 103 East Jones Street | 1891 | |
| Margaret Dibble Duplex (west half) | Calhoun Ward | | 107 East Jones Street | 1853 | Stoop enlarged 1903 |
| Margaret Dibble Duplex (east half) | Calhoun Ward | | 109 East Jones Street | 1853 | |
| Eliza Ann Jewett Row (111 East Jones facade) | Calhoun Ward | | 111 East Jones Street | 1852-1853 | |
| Eliza Ann Jewett Row (113 East Jones facade) | Calhoun Ward | | 113 East Jones Street | 1852-1853 | |
| Eliza Ann Jewett Row (115 East Jones facade) | Calhoun Ward | | 115 East Jones Street | 1852-1853 | |
| Eliza Ann Jewett Row House, eastern addition (117 East Jones facade) | Calhoun Ward | | 117 East Jones Street | 1854 | |
| Eliza Ann Jewett Row House, eastern addition (119 East Jones facade) | Calhoun Ward | | 119 East Jones Street | 1854 | See also Eliza Ann Jewett Row Houses (Jasper Ward, Lafayette Ward) |
| Augustus Barié Property (Calhoun Ward) | Calhoun Ward | | 123 East Jones Street | 1855 | Bay window & balcony added 1876; see also Augustus Barié Properties (Crawford Ward, Lafayette Ward, Troup Ward) |
| Francis Waver House | Calhoun Ward | | 125 East Jones Street | 1856 | |
| Francis Ruckert Property | Calhoun Ward | | 207-211 East Jones Street | 1866 | |
| Thomas Holcombe Duplex (western half) | Calhoun Ward | | 213 East Jones Street | 1853 | |
| Thomas Holcombe Duplex (eastern half) | Calhoun Ward | | 215 East Jones Street | 1853 | |
| James Graybill House | Calhoun Ward | | 223 East Jones Street (view from Lincoln Street) | 1866 | |
| Alexander Bennett House | Calhoun Ward | | 102 East Taylor Street | 1853 | |
| John Kuck House | Calhoun Ward | | 106 East Taylor Street | 1906 | |
| Guckenheimer Row | Calhoun Ward | | 108-114 East Taylor Street | 1873 | By M.C. Murphy |
| Adam Short Property | Calhoun Ward | | 118-120 East Taylor Street | 1853 | |
| Mary Demere (Estate of) House | Calhoun Ward | | 126 East Taylor Street | 1872 | |
| Mary Demere House | Calhoun Ward | | 128 East Taylor Street | 1860 | Bay windows added 1894 |
| William Rogers House | Calhoun Ward | | 202 East Taylor Street | 1859 | |
| George Ash Row House (1) | Calhoun Ward | | 206-210 East Taylor Street | 1855 | |
| Andrew Hanley House | Calhoun Ward | | 214 East Taylor Street | 1883 | |
| George Ash & Francis Grimball Duplex | Calhoun Ward | | 216-218 East Taylor Street | 1854 | |
| George Ash Row House (2) | Calhoun Ward | | 220-224 East Taylor Street | 1868 | See also George Ash properties (Troup Ward, Wesley Ward) |
| John Hopkins Property (1) | Wesley Ward | | 304 East Gaston Street | 1867 | |
| John Hopkins Property (2) | Wesley Ward | | 308-310 East Gaston Street | 1890 | |
| Hibernia McDonough House | Wesley Ward | | 314-316 East Gaston Street | 1883 | |
| Harriet Neufville House | Wesley Ward | | 318 East Gaston Street | 1887 | Enlarged 1904 |
| Tomlinson Johnson House | Wesley Ward | | 402-404 East Gaston Street | 1888 | |
| Laura Jones House | Wesley Ward | | 408 East Gaston Street | 1892 | |
| William Bohan Property (1) | Wesley Ward | | 410 East Gaston Street | 1891 | |
| William Bohan Property (2) | Wesley Ward | | 412 East Gaston Street | 1891 | |
| Beth Eden Baptist Church | Wesley Ward | | 302 East Gordon Street | 1893 | Designed by Henry C. Urban |
| John Schwarz Duplex | Wesley Ward | | 307-309 East Gordon Street | 1861 | |
| Henry Hermann House | Wesley Ward | | 313 East Gordon Street | 1861 | |
| Sarah Sexton Property (1) | Wesley Ward | | 401 East Gordon Street | 1901 | |
| Sarah Sexton Property (2) | Wesley Ward | | 403 East Gordon Street | 1890 | |
| Emma Hunter House | Wesley Ward | | 405 East Gordon Street | 1895 | |
| 407 East Gordon Street | Wesley Ward | | 407 East Gordon Street | 1890 | |
| 409 East Gordon Street | Wesley Ward | | 409 East Gordon Street | 1890 | |
| Abraham Samuels Row House | Wesley Ward | | 414-420 East Gordon Street | 1888 | R.K. Bragdon, builder |
| 415-419 East Gordon Street | Wesley Ward | | 415-419 East Gordon Street | 1886 | Converted to a store 1895 |
| Augustus Bonard Row House | Wesley Ward | | 313-317 East Jones Street | 1868 | By M. Williams |
| Sarah Bailey Duplex | Wesley Ward | | 321-323 East Jones Street | 1853 | |
| Charles Barnwall–Sabra Ulmer Duplex (western half) | Wesley Ward | | 401 East Jones Street | 1856 | Front porch enlarged 1904 |
| Charles Barnwall–Sabra Ulmer Duplex (eastern half) | Wesley Ward | | 405 East Jones Street | 1856 | |
| Paulson & Morgan Row House | Wesley Ward | | 407-413 East Jones Street | 1875 | |
| J.J. Dale Duplex (Wesley Ward) | Wesley Ward | | 415-417 East Jones Street | 1883 | See also J.J. Dale Duplex (Troup Ward), across the street |
| Frederick Klug House | Wesley Ward | | 427-429 East Jones Street | 1879 | |
| John McCluskey House | Wesley Ward | | 408 East Taylor Street | 1891 | |
| Andrew Nelson House | Wesley Ward | | 410 East Taylor Street | 1860 | |
| George Ash Duplex | Wesley Ward | | 412-414 East Taylor Street | 1855 | See also George Ash properties (Calhoun Ward, Troup Ward) |
| 415 East Taylor Street | Wesley Ward | | 415 East Taylor Street | 1888 | |
| 417 East Taylor Street | Wesley Ward | | 417 East Taylor Street | 1888 | |
| 419 East Taylor Street | Wesley Ward | | 419 East Taylor Street | 1888 | |
| George Hawkins House | Wesley Ward | | 410 Habersham Street | 1892 | |
| First Congregational Church | Wesley Ward | | 421 Habersham Street | 1895 | |
| 424 Habersham Street | Wesley Ward | | 424 Habersham Street | 1896 | |
| 426 Habersham Street | Wesley Ward | | 426 Habersham Street | 1896 | |
| Mary Dwyer Triplex | Wesley Ward | | 427-431 Habersham Street | 1886 | |
| John Powers Duplex | Wesley Ward | | 430-432 Habersham Street | 1886-1887 | |
| John Entelman Property (1) | Wesley Ward | | 433 Habersham Street | 1896 | See additional John Entelman properties (Stephens Ward & Warren Ward) |
| John Entelman Property (2) | Wesley Ward | | 435 Habersham Street | 1896 | |
| John Entelman Property (3) | Wesley Ward | | 437 Habersham Street | 1897 | |
| Sarah Sexton Property (3) | Wesley Ward | | 440 Habersham Street | 1902 | |
| John Schwarz Row House | Wesley Ward | | 436-442 Lincoln Street | 1867 | |
| Frederick Wessels Row House | Wesley Ward | | 411-419 Price Street | 1876 | Built by Alex Barbee |
| Cord Asendorf Property | Wesley Ward | | 443-447 Price Street | 1892 | See also Cord Asendorf Properties (Crawford Ward, Stephens Ward) |
| 501-503 Blair Street | Davis Ward | | 501-503 Blair Street | 1900 (circa) | |
| 505-509 Blair Street | Davis Ward | | 505-509 Blair Street | 1900 | |
| 518-520 Blair Street | Davis Ward | | 518-520 Blair Street | 1889 | |
| 522-524 Blair Street | Davis Ward | | 522-524 Blair Street | 1889 | |
| Saint Francis Home orphanage | Davis Ward | | 439 East Broad Street | 1908 | Originally Saint Francis Home for Colored Orphans, founded by Mathilda Beasley |
| 517-519 East Broad Street | Davis Ward | | 517-519 East Broad Street | 1897 | |
| 521-523 East Broad Street | Davis Ward | | 521-523 East Broad Street | 1897 | |
| 529-531 East Broad Street | Davis Ward | | 529-531 East Broad Street | 1900 | |
| 533-535 East Broad Street | Davis Ward | | 533-535 East Broad Street | 1900 (circa) | |
| Josephine Rogers House | Davis Ward | | 519 East Gaston Street | 1889 | |
| York Milledge House | Davis Ward | | 521 East Gaston Street | 1891 | |
| John Starr House | Davis Ward | | 523 East Gaston Street | 1892 | |
| James Rogers Property | Davis Ward | | 525-527 East Gaston Street | 1896 | |
| 536-538 East Gaston Street | Davis Ward | | 536-538 East Gaston Street | 1899 | |
| 540-542 East Gaston Street | Davis Ward | | 540-542 East Gaston Street | 1907 | |
| 544-546 East Gaston Street | Davis Ward | | 544-546 East Gaston Street | 1907 | |
| Frank Mirault Property | Davis Ward | | 508 East Gordon Street | 1883 | |
| Michael Cahill House | Davis Ward | | 518 East Gordon Street | 1886 | |
| Thomas Corcoran House | Davis Ward | | 522 East Gordon Street | 1884 | |
| 527-537 East Gordon Street | Davis Ward | | 527-537 East Gordon Street | 1868 | |
| Dennis Shea Cottage | Davis Ward | | 530 East Gordon Street | 1867 | |
| Harriet Gardner House | Davis Ward | | 540 East Gordon Street | 1884 | |
| J. Ferris Cann Property | Davis Ward | | 543-545 East Gordon Street | 1894 | |
| St. Benedict the Moor school building | Davis Ward | | 554 East Gordon Street | 1910 | |
| St. Benedict the Moor rectory building | Davis Ward | | 556 East Gordon Street | 1910 | |
| Hartridge Lane Tenement Row House | Davis Ward | | 539-545 Hartridge Lane | 1906 | |
| East Huntingdon Street Tenement Row House | Davis Ward | | 540-544 East Huntingdon Street | 1906 | |
| King–Tisdell Cottage | Davis Ward | | 514 East Huntingdon Street | 1896 | |
| Charles & Joseph Fulton House | Davis Ward | | 503-505 East Jones Street | 1872 | |
| Silas Fulton Property (1) | Davis Ward | | 507-509 East Jones Street | 1860 | |
| James Bandy Property | Davis Ward | | 511-513 East Jones Street | 1861 | |
| Silas Fulton Property (2) | Davis Ward | | 515-517 East Jones Street | 1860 | |
| Joseph Bandy Property (1) | Davis Ward | | 519-525 East Jones Street | 1866 | |
| Joseph Bandy Property (2) | Davis Ward | | 527-529 East Jones Street | 1868 | |
| Sarah Pierce Property | Davis Ward | | 502-506 East Taylor Street | 1859/1891 | Originally single story grocery; second level added 1891 |
| William Miller Property | Davis Ward | | 508-510 East Taylor Street | 1860 | |
| Robert Mason & Anthony Desverney Duplex | Davis Ward | | 540-542 East Taylor Street | 1870-1872 | |
| 554 East Taylor Street/419-421 East Broad Street | Davis Ward | | 554 East Taylor Street/419-421 East Broad Street | 1893 | |
| Silas Fulton Property | Davis Ward | | 408-410 Price Street | 1860 | |
| Henry Sulter Row House | Davis Ward | | 422-428 Price Street | 1881 | |
| Martin Sulter Duplex | Davis Ward | | 436-438 Price Street | 1888 | |
| Mathias Ray Property | Davis Ward | | 502-504 Price Street | 1882 | |
| McMillan Brothers Property | Davis Ward | | 506-508 Price Street | 1893 | |
| Bridget Deasy House | Davis Ward | | 510 Price Street | 1884 | |
| 524-534 Price Street | Davis Ward | | 524-534 Price Street | 1893 | |
| 307 Lorch Street | Gaston Ward | | 307 Lorch Street | 1889 | |
| 309 Lorch Street | Gaston Ward | | 309 Lorch Street | 1890 | |
| 515 Montgomery Street (demolished) | Gaston Ward | | 515 Montgomery Street | | |
| Bernard Graeffe Property | Gaston Ward | | 602-604 Montgomery Street | 1871 | |
| 619-621 Montgomery Street | Gaston Ward | | 619-621 Montgomery Street | 1915 | |
| 624 Montgomery Street | Gaston Ward | | 624 Montgomery Street | 1900 | |
| John Lorch Property | Gaston Ward | | 511-513 Tattnall Street | 1868-70 | |
| Nora Forhan House | Gaston Ward | | 607 Tattnall Street | 1871 | |
| Frederick Jakens Property | Gaston Ward | | 609-611 Tattnall Street | 1893 | |
| Walter Metzger Property (1) | Gaston Ward | | 313 West Hall Street | 1892 | |
| Claus Monses Property | Gaston Ward | | 314-322 West Hall Street | 1906 | |
| Walter Metzger Property (2) | Gaston Ward | | 315 West Hall Street | 1892 | |
| Josephine Mathews Property | Charlton Ward | | 607 Barnard Street | 1894 | |
| Frank Keilback House | Charlton Ward | | 609 Barnard Street | 1890 | |
| John Hamlet Property | Charlton Ward | | 701-703 Barnard Street | 1870 | |
| Emma Hamlet Property | Charlton Ward | | 705-707 Barnard Street | 1856 | |
| Emmanuel Mendel Property | Charlton Ward | | 506 Tattnall Street | 1856 | |
| Alexander Estell Property | Charlton Ward | | 508 Tattnall Street | 1857 | |
| John Muller Property | Charlton Ward | | 512 Tattnall Street | 1866 | |
| Frances Mendel Property | Charlton Ward | | 514-516 Tattnall Street | 1858 | |
| John Muller (Estate of) Property | Charlton Ward | | 209-211 West Gaston Street | 1870 | |
| John Hamlet Property/Bynes-Royall Funeral Home | Charlton Ward | | 204 West Hall Street | 1883 | Additional additions 1887; Bynes-Royall location since 1963 |
| John Keller Property | Charlton Ward | | 208-210 West Hall Street | 1883 | |
| John Hamlet/David Bailey Row House | Charlton Ward | | 209-215 West Hall Street | 1869 | |
| William Bailey Property | Charlton Ward | | 212 West Hall Street | 1890 | |
| Waring Russell House | Charlton Ward | | 205 West Huntingdon Street | 1868 | |
| John Houston Property | Charlton Ward | | 208-210 West Huntingdon Street | 1870 | |
| William Bailey & William Chaplin Property (eastern half) | Charlton Ward | | 212-214 West Huntingdon Street | 1889 | |
| William Bailey & William Chaplin Property (western half) | Charlton Ward | | 216-218 West Huntingdon Street | 1889 | |
| Martin Weldenkin Property | Charlton Ward | | 215 West Huntingdon Street | 1860 (circa) | |
| Adrian Robertson House | Forsyth Ward | | 612 Barnard Street | 1886 | |
| Matthew O'Connell House | Forsyth Ward | | 616 Barnard Street | 1888 | |
| Savannah/Candler Hospital (Old Site) | Forsyth Ward | | 516 Drayton Street (116 East Huntingdon Street) | 1819/1876 | Site retired 1980; now part of SCAD |
| William Baker House | Forsyth Ward | | 612 Drayton Street | 1872 | |
| William Hone House | Forsyth Ward | | 618 Drayton Street | 1872 | |
| Lewis Kayton House | Forsyth Ward | | 700 Drayton Street | 1889 | By Alfred Eichberg |
| Archibald McAllister House | Forsyth Ward | | 509 Howard Street | 1869 | |
| John Scudder (Estate of) Property | Forsyth Ward | | 515-517 Howard Street | 1869 | |
| 610 Howard Street | Forsyth Ward | | 610 Howard Street | 1899 (by) | |
| 612 Howard Street | Forsyth Ward | | 612 Howard Street | 1894 | Rear outbuilding of 611 Whitaker Street |
| Henry Blun Property | Forsyth Ward | | 113 West Gaston Street / 501 Howard Street | 1870-1871 | |
| Blun–Meyer Row | Forsyth Ward | | 115-125 West Gaston Street | 1870-1871 | |
| Forsyth Park Inn | Forsyth Ward | | 102 West Hall Street | 1899 (by) | |
| Calvin Gilbert House | Forsyth Ward | | 108 West Hall Street | 1869 | |
| J.P. Williams House | Forsyth Ward | | 118 West Hall Street | 1888 | By Calvin Fay and Alfred Eichberg; part of SCAD |
| Charles Shearson House | Forsyth Ward | | 121 West Hall Street | 1896 | |
| Frances Hunter Property | Forsyth Ward | | 111-119 West Huntingdon Street | 1895 | |
| Henry and William Lattimore Duplex | Forsyth Ward | | 122-124 West Huntingdon Street | 1901 | |
| W. B. Hodgson Hall | Forsyth Ward | | 501 Whitaker Street | 1876 | By the American Institute of Architects' founder Detlef Lienau; on the NRHP |
| Magnolia Hall | Forsyth Ward | | 503 Whitaker Street | 1883 | Built for Jacob Guerard Heyward, the great-grandson of Thomas Heyward Jr. |
| John Williamson House | Forsyth Ward | | 509 Whitaker Street | 1870 | Mansard roof added 1911 |
| Metts–McNeill House | Forsyth Ward | | 513 Whitaker Street | 1903 | Built for Lawrence McNeill by G. L. Norrman |
| 601 Whitaker Street | Forsyth Ward | | 601 Whitaker Street | 1883 | |
| 603 Whitaker Street | Forsyth Ward | | 603 Whitaker Street | 1888 | |
| 605 Whitaker Street | Forsyth Ward | | 605 Whitaker Street | 1886 | |
| William Holt House | Forsyth Ward | | 609 Whitaker Street | 1886 | |
| 611 Whitaker Street | Forsyth Ward | | 611 Whitaker Street | 1894 | |
| Joseph Chestnut House | Forsyth Ward | | 701 Whitaker Street | 1892 | |
| 703 Whitaker Street | Forsyth Ward | | 703 Whitaker Street | 1890 | |
| 705 Whitaker Street | Forsyth Ward | | 705 Whitaker Street | 1900 | |
| Algernon Hartridge House | Stephens Ward | | 516 Abercorn Street | 1870 | |
| Gilbert Watkins House | Stephens Ward | | 201 East Gaston Street | 1869 | |
| William Boyd House | Stephens Ward | | 205 East Gaston Street | 1868 | |
| Dresser–Palmer House | Stephens Ward | | 211 East Gaston Street | 1876 (circa) | Now the Bellwether House bed and breakfast |
| Dale Row (Stephens Ward) | Stephens Ward | | 213-221 East Gaston Street | 1877 | See also Dale Row (Troup Ward) and Dale–Wells Row House (Calhoun Ward) |
| Donald McDonald House | Stephens Ward | | 303 East Gaston Street | 1867 | Remodeled 1899 |
| John Entelman Property | Stephens Ward | | 405-407 East Gaston Street | 1892 | See additional John Entelman properties (Warren Ward & Wesley Ward) |
| Solomon Cohen Row House (Stephens Ward) | Stephens Ward | | 409-417 East Gaston Street | 1890 | See additional Solomon Cohen properties (Derby Ward, Jackson Ward, Pulaski Ward & Troup Ward) |
| Margaret Lafar House | Stephens Ward | | 206-208 East Gwinnett Street | 1883 | |
| Fannie Smith House | Stephens Ward | | 202 East Gwinnett Street | 1882 | Piazza added in 1895 |
| William P. Hardee House | Stephens Ward | | 212-214 East Gwinnett Street | 1884 | |
| Virginia Drane House | Stephens Ward | | 222 East Gwinnett Street | 1884 | |
| 224-226 East Gwinnett Street | Stephens Ward | | 224-226 East Gwinnett Street | 1883 | Childhood home of Johnny Mercer |
| 410 East Gwinnett Street | Stephens Ward | | 410 East Gwinnett Street | 1886 | |
| 412-416 East Gwinnett Street | Stephens Ward | | 412-416 East Gwinnett Street | 1899 | |
| 422 East Gwinnett Street | Stephens Ward | | 422 East Gwinnett Street | 1894 | |
| Augusta Wayne House | Stephens Ward | | 204 East Hall Street | 1871 | |
| George Saussy/Bridget Clark Duplex | Stephens Ward | | 205-207 East Hall Street | 1872 | |
| George Mills House | Stephens Ward | | 208 East Hall Street | 1881 | Mansard roof added 1888 |
| Julius C. LeHardy House ("Brockington Hall") | Stephens Ward | | 213 East Hall Street | 1884 | |
| George Johnson Baldwin House | Stephens Ward | | 225 East Hall Street | 1888 | By William G. Preston |
| Rufus Lester House | Stephens Ward | | 226 East Hall Street | 1885 | |
| Uranie Gaudry House | Stephens Ward | | 304 East Hall Street | 1884 | |
| John Gaudry House | Stephens Ward | | 308 East Hall Street | 1891 | |
| John Bouhan Property (west) | Stephens Ward | | 401 East Hall Street | 1884 | |
| Elizabeth Thompson House | Stephens Ward | | 402 East Hall Street | 1887 | |
| John Bouhan Property (east) | Stephens Ward | | 403 East Hall Street | 1884 | |
| 405 East Hall Street | Stephens Ward | | 405 East Hall Street | 1892 | |
| John Linderstruth House | Stephens Ward | | 417 East Hall Street | 1873 | |
| 212 East Huntingdon Street | Stephens Ward | | 212 East Huntingdon Street | 1903 | |
| 217 East Huntingdon Street ("Azalea Inn") | Stephens Ward | | 217 East Huntingdon Street | 1885 | |
| 225 East Huntingdon Street | Stephens Ward | | 225 East Huntingdon Street | 1913 | |
| Elizabeth Reilly Property | Stephens Ward | | 220-224 East Huntingdon Street | 1870 | |
| Irwin & George Tiedeman House | Stephens Ward | | 226-228 East Huntingdon Street | 1890 | By Alfred Eichberg |
| McMillan Brothers Property ("McMillan Inn") | Stephens Ward | | 302-304 East Huntingdon Street | 1888 | |
| Thomas McMillan Property | Stephens Ward | | 306-308 East Huntingdon Street | 1884 | |
| Albert Bacon Property | Stephens Ward | | 312-314 East Huntingdon Street | 1881-1882 | |
| Cord Asendorf Property | Stephens Ward | | 317-319 East Huntingdon Street | 1888 | See also Cord Asendorf Properties (Crawford Ward, Wesley Ward) |
| McMillan Row House | Stephens Ward | | 402-410 East Huntingdon Street | 1892 | |
| Frederick Wessels Row House (western portion) | Stephens Ward | | 407-411 East Huntingdon Street | 1892 | |
| Frederick Wessels Row House (eastern portion) | Stephens Ward | | 413-415 East Huntingdon Street | 1892 | |
| Frederick Wessels Standalone Property | Stephens Ward | | 417 East Huntingdon Street | 1892 | |
| Dennis McCarthy House | Stephens Ward | | 414 East Huntingdon Street | 1897 | |
| Solomon Cohen Property (1) | Stephens Ward | | 416 East Huntingdon Street | 1892 | |
| Solomon Cohen Property (2) | Stephens Ward | | 418 East Huntingdon Street | 1892 | See additional Solomon Cohen properties (Derby Ward, Jackson Ward, Pulaski Ward & Troup Ward) |
| Dora Smith Property | Stephens Ward | | 420 East Huntingdon Street | 1892 | |
| Emeline Lee Property (1) | Stephens Ward | | 602 Habersham Street | 1889-1892 | |
| Emeline Lee Property (2) | Stephens Ward | | 604 Habersham Street | 1889-1892 | |
| Emeline Lee Property (3) | Stephens Ward | | 608-610 Habersham Street | 1892 | |
| Frederick Wessels Duplex (1) | Stephens Ward | | 607-609 Price Street | 1891 | |
| Frederick Wessels Duplex (2) | Stephens Ward | | 615-617 Price Street | 1892 | |
| Matilde Goetke Duplex (1) | Mercer Ward | | 619-621 East Broad Street | 1898 | |
| Matilde Goetke Duplex (2) | Mercer Ward | | 623-625 East Broad Street | 1898 | |
| Mary Richardson House | Mercer Ward | | 510 East Gwinnett Street | 1881 | |
| 522 East Gwinnett Street | Mercer Ward | | 522 East Gwinnett Street | 1887 | |
| 504-506 East Hall Lane (demolished) | Mercer Ward | | 504-506 East Hall Lane | | |
| 520 East Hall Lane | Mercer Ward | | 520 East Hall Lane | 1920 | |
| 505-507 East Hall Street | Mercer Ward | | 505-507 East Hall Street | 1888 | |
| 511 East Hall Street | Mercer Ward | | 511 East Hall Street | 1883 | |
| 512 East Hall Street | Mercer Ward | | 512 East Hall Street | 1883 | |
| 501-503 East Huntingdon Street | Mercer Ward | | 501-503 East Huntingdon Street | 1890 | |
| 515 East Huntingdon Street | Mercer Ward | | 515 East Huntingdon Street | 1898 | |
| 609-611 Mercer Street | Mercer Ward | | 609-611 Mercer Street | 1918 | |
| 615 Mercer Street | Mercer Ward | | 615 Mercer Street | 1885 | |
| 627 Mercer Street | Mercer Ward | | 627 Mercer Street | 1895 | |
| 510 Nicoll Street | Mercer Ward | | 510 Nicoll Street | 1900 | |
| 520-522 Nicoll Street | Mercer Ward | | 520-522 Nicoll Street | 1900 | |
| 548 Nicoll Street | Mercer Ward | | 548 Nicoll Street | 1900 | |
| Matilde Goetke Duplex (3) | Mercer Ward | | 549-551 Nicoll Street | 1898 | |
| 608-612 Price Street | Mercer Ward | | 608-612 Price Street | 1880 | |
| 621-627 Ruben Court/Rose Court (demolished) | Mercer Ward | | 621-627 Ruben Court/Rose Court | | |
| 622-624 Ruben Court/Rose Court | Mercer Ward | | 622-624 Ruben Court/Rose Court | 1884 | |
| St. Philip Monumental AME Church | Gue Ward | | 1112 Jefferson Street | 1911 | |

== See also ==
- List of historic houses and buildings in Savannah, Georgia
- Historic Savannah Foundation
- Savannah Victorian Historic District
