= William Remshart Row House =

Historic building in Savannah, Georgia, United States

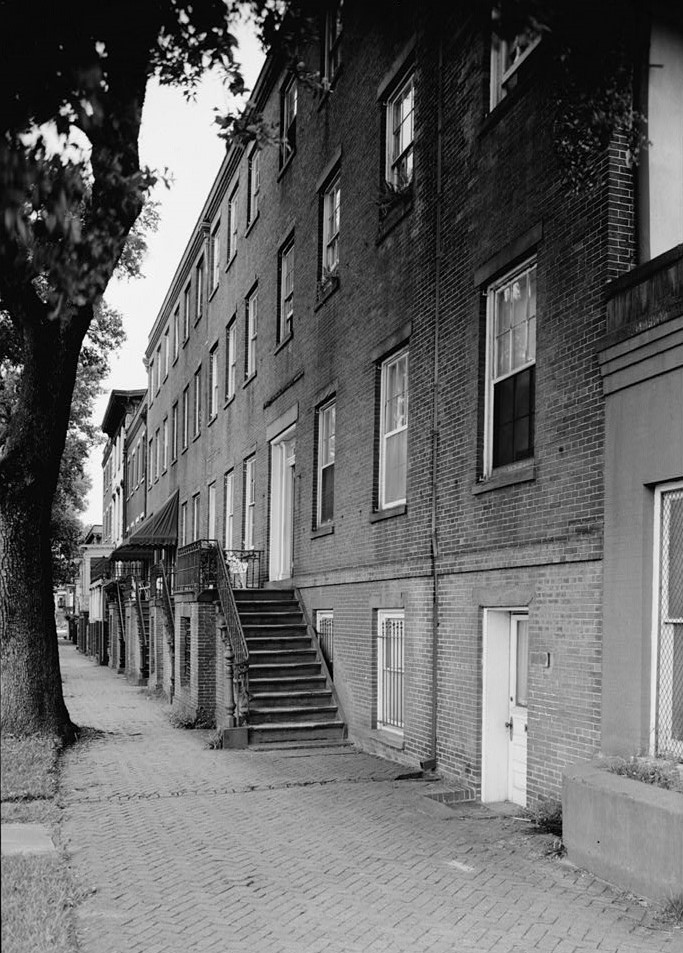
- The row pictured in a mid-20th century photograph for the Historic American Buildings Survey
- Interactive map of the William Remshart Row House area

General information
- Location: Savannah, Georgia, U.S., 102–112 West Jones Street
- Coordinates: 32.0729972892°N 81.095730523°W
- Completed: 1853 (173 years ago)

The William Remshart Row House is a historic building in Savannah, Georgia, United States. It comprises the four properties between 102 and 111 West Jones Street, and was completed in 1853. It is a contributing property of the Savannah Historic District, itself on the National Register of Historic Places.

In the mid-19th century, the property was documented by the Historic American Buildings Survey as being significant for its representation of mid-19th-century Savannah row houses, particularly due to its high stoops. Other similar-style row houses exist in Savannah's Gordon Row, the Jones Street Quantock Row, the Chatham Square Quantock Row, Scudder's Row, McDonough Row and Mary Marshall Row.

It was built for William Remshart (1804–1878), a prominent Savannah commission merchant.

== The properties in 2022 ==
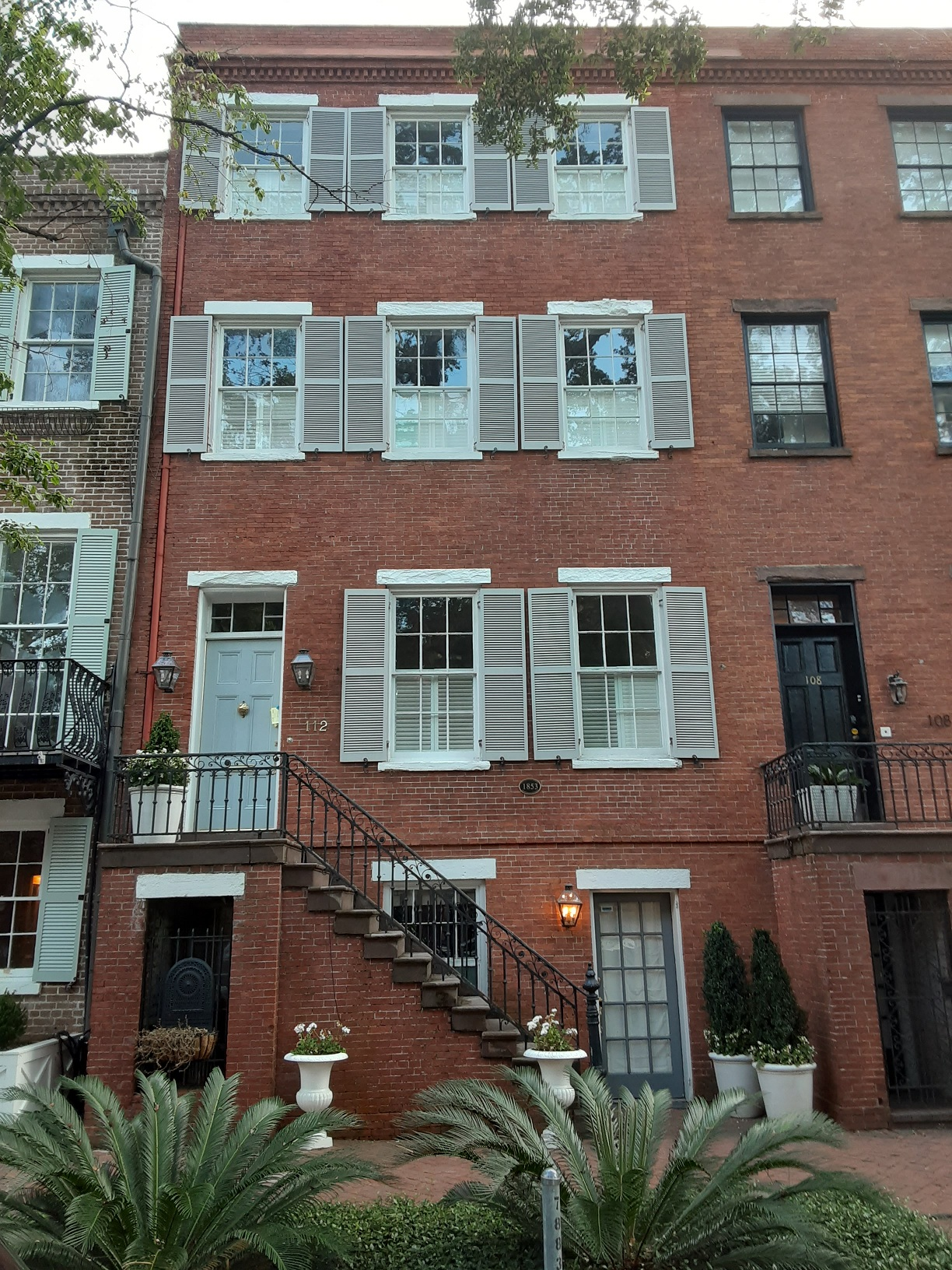
110–112

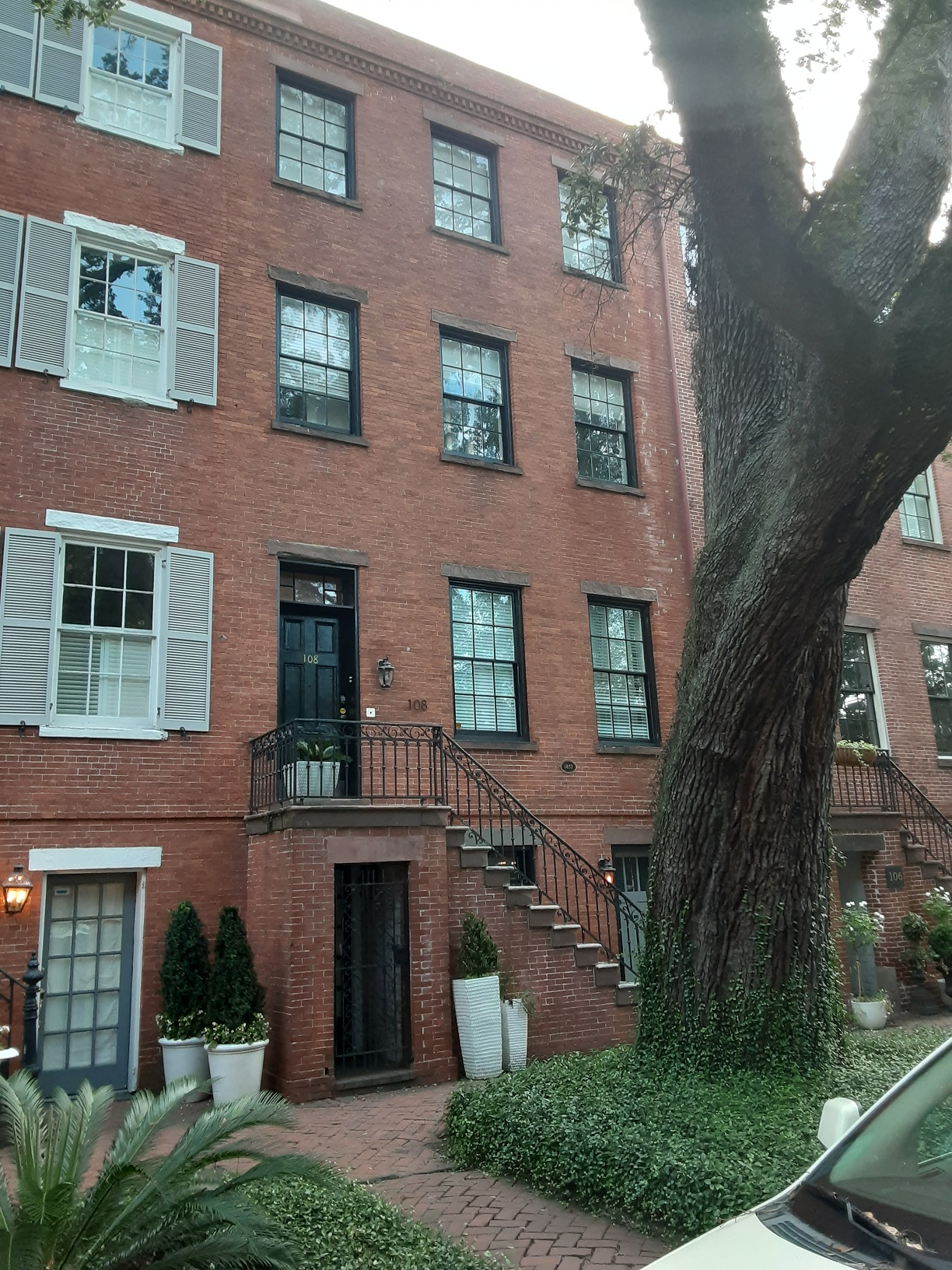
108

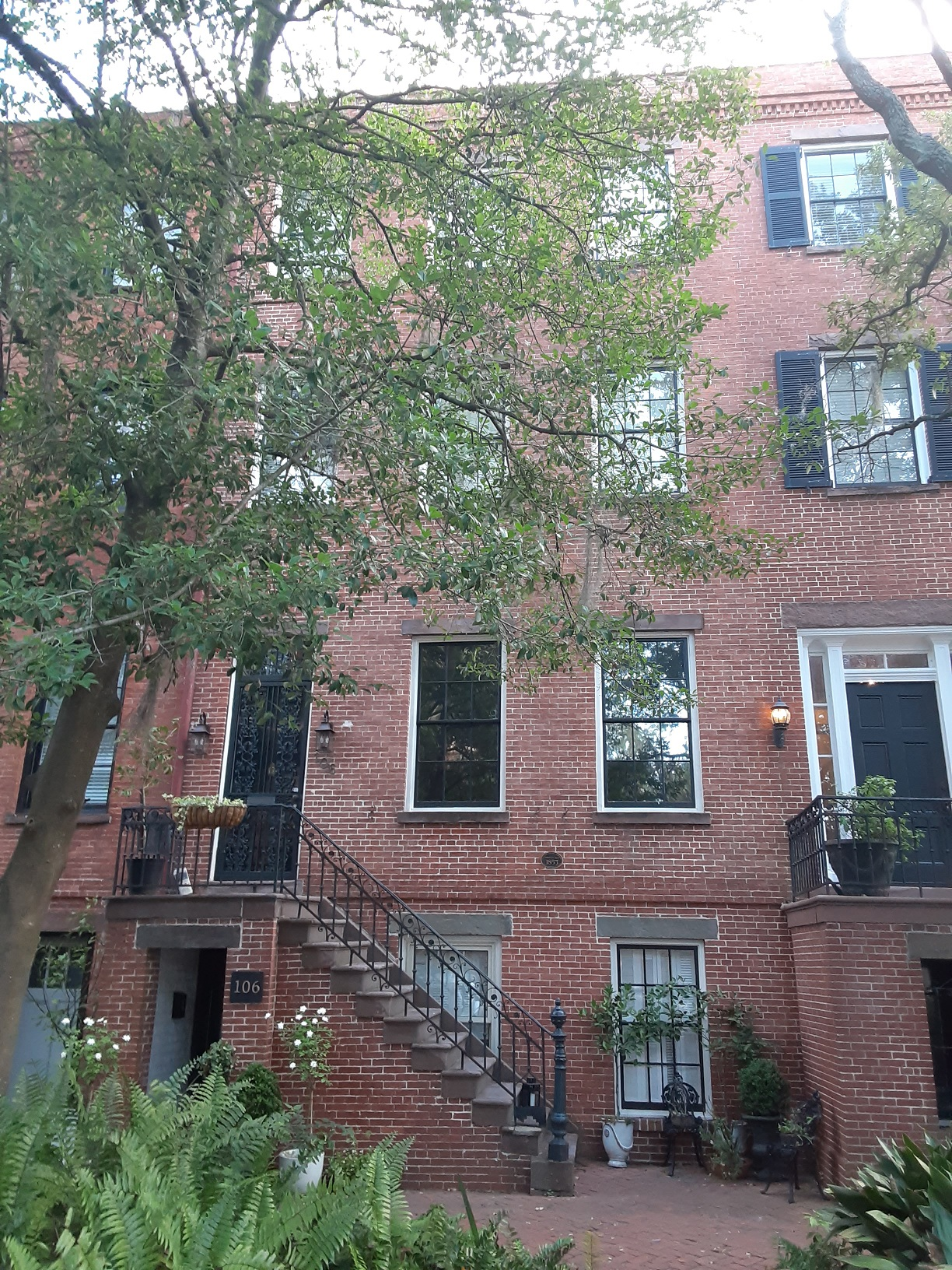
106

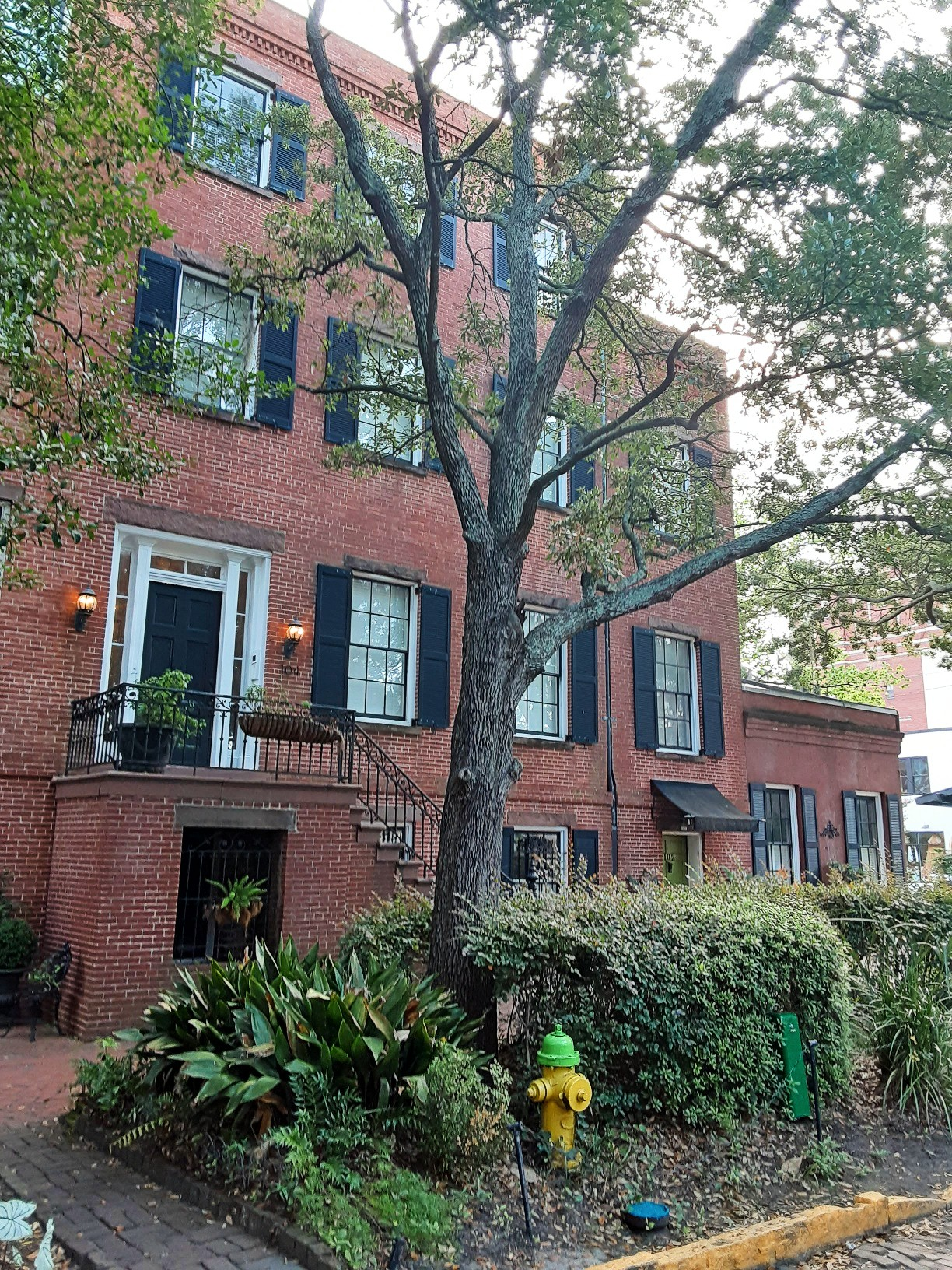
102–104

== See also ==
- Buildings in Savannah Historic District
