= 550 East State Street =

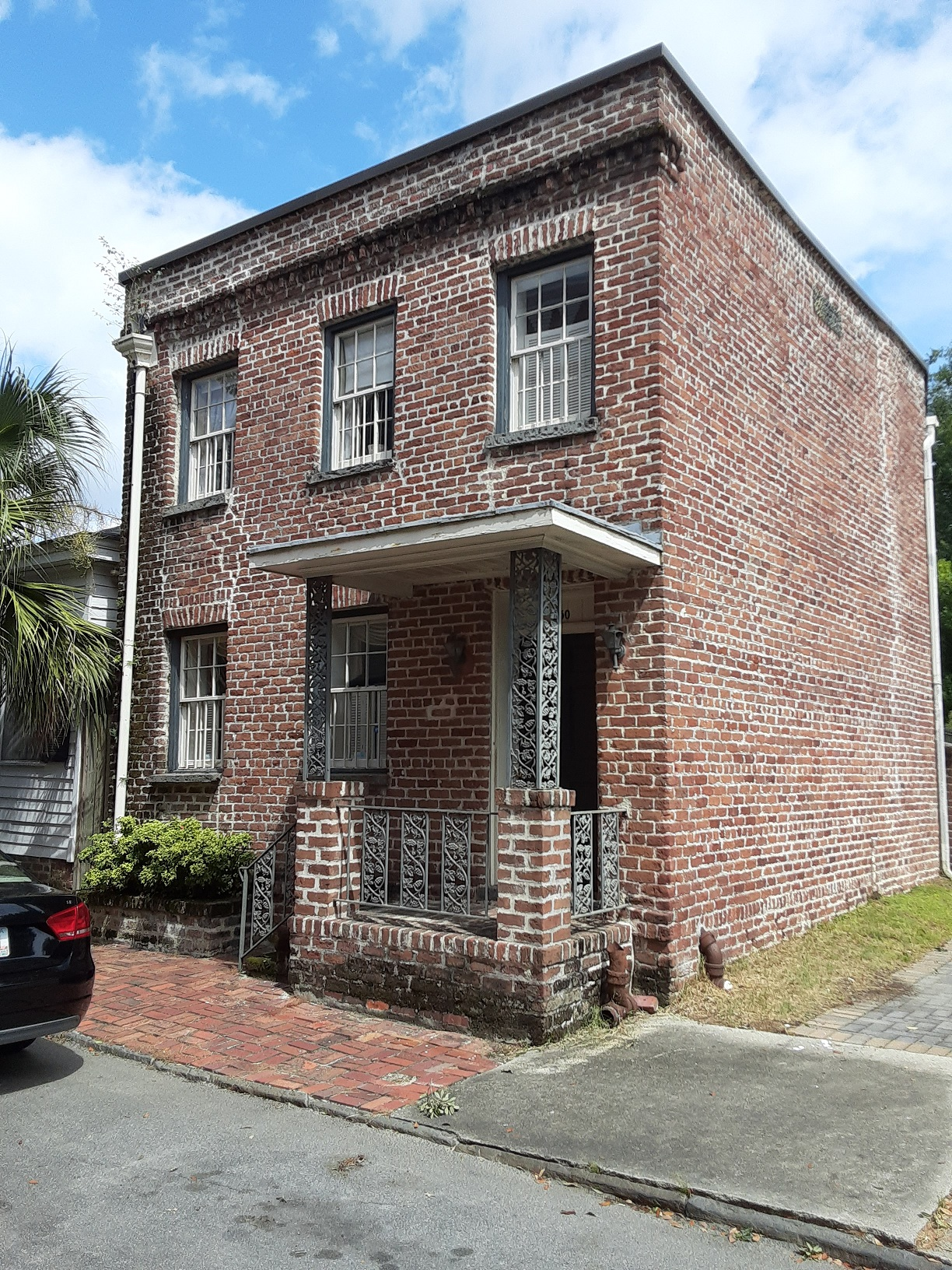
- The building in 2021
- Interactive map of the 550 East State Street area

General information
- Location: Savannah, Georgia, U.S., 550 East State Street
- Coordinates: 32.07656°N 81.08539°W
- Completed: 1854; 172 years ago

Technical details
- Floor count: 2

550 East State Street is a historic building in Savannah, Georgia, United States. It is located in the northeastern tything of Greene Square and was built in 1854. It is also known as Joseph Burke House, and is part of the Savannah Historic District. Joseph Burke, a native of Wicklow, Ireland, was a commission merchant and exchange broker. He had offices in one of John Stoddard's buildings on River Street.

In a survey for Historic Savannah Foundation, Mary Lane Morrison found the building to be of significant status.

== See also ==
- Buildings in Savannah Historic District
