= McDonough Row =

Historic row house in Savannah, Georgia, United States

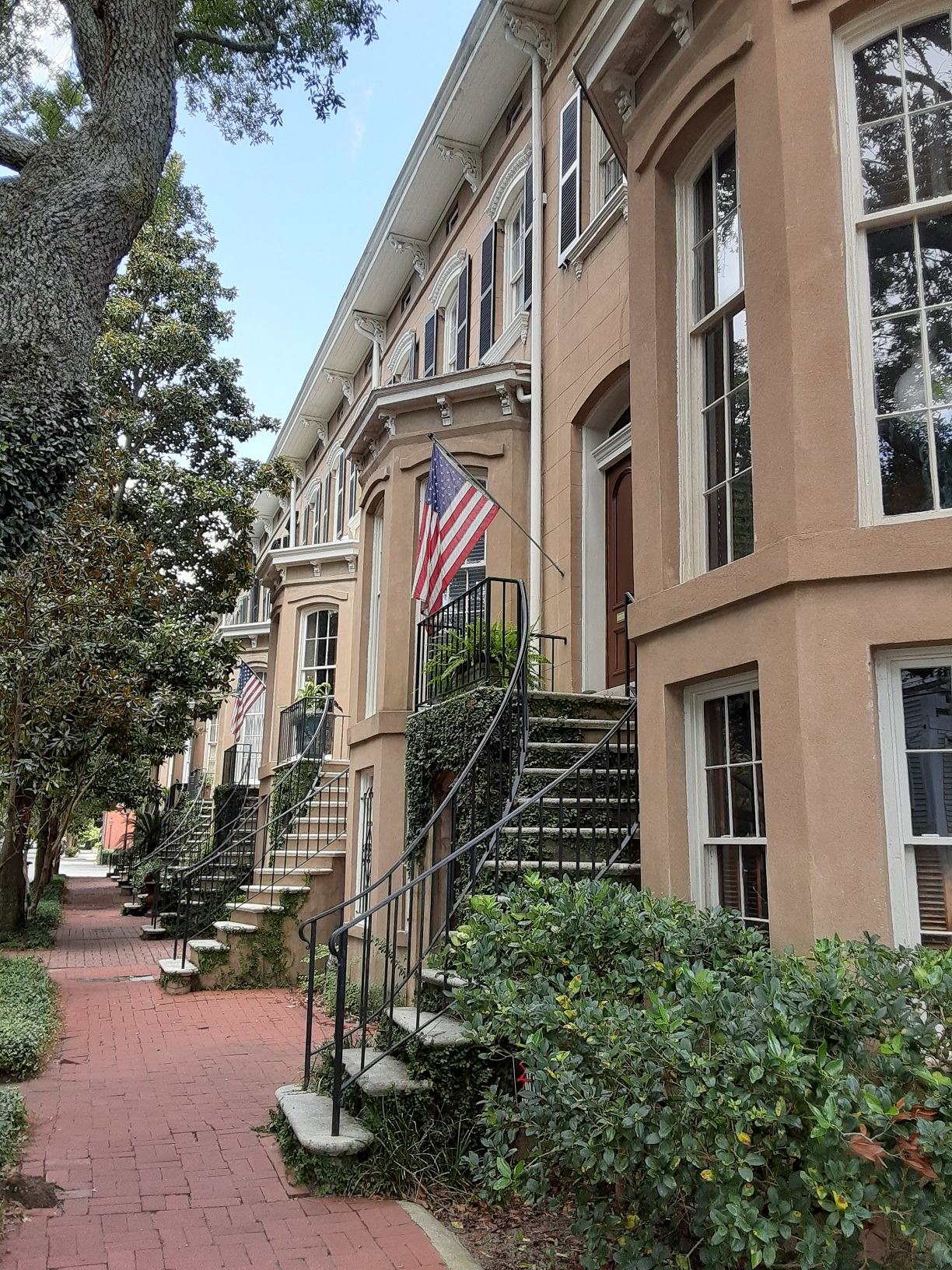
- The property in 2021
- Interactive map of the McDonough Row area

General information
- Location: Savannah, Georgia, U.S., 419–424 Charlton Street
- Coordinates: 32.072113°N 81.089220°W
- Completed: 1882 (144 years ago)

McDonough Row (also known as John McDonough Row) is a historic row house in Savannah, Georgia, United States. It stands at 410–424 East Charlton Street, in the southeastern civic lot of Troup Square. They are contributing properties of the Savannah Historic District, itself on the National Register of Historic Places.

The properties were built in 1882 by John J. McDonough, future mayor of Savannah.

Other similar-style row houses exist in Savannah's Gordon Row, the Jones Street Quantock Row, the Chatham Square Quantock Row, William Remshart Row House and Mary Marshall Row.

== See also ==
- Buildings in Savannah Historic District
