= Mary Marshall Row =

Historic row house in Savannah, Georgia, United States

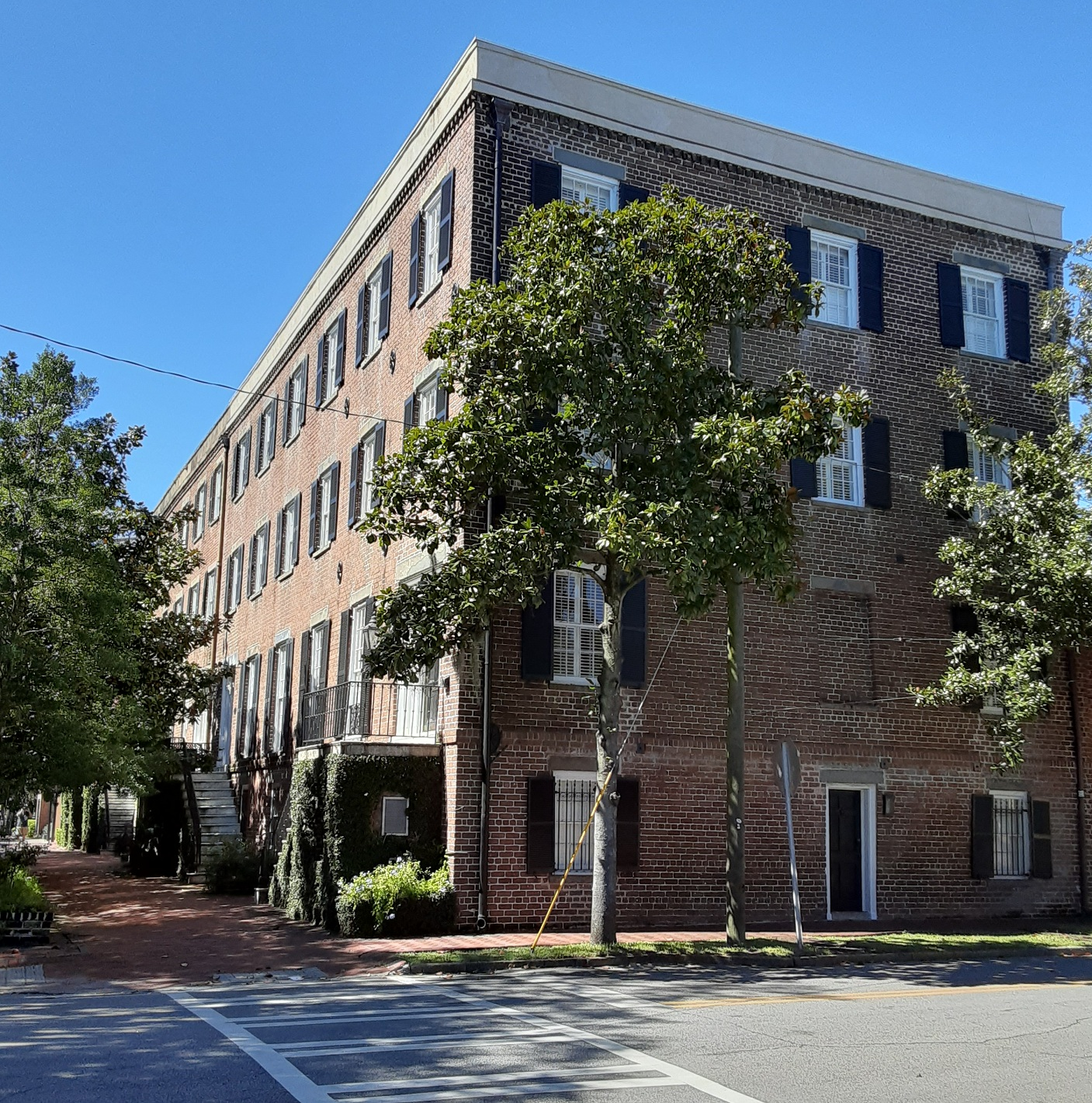
- The property in 2021, viewed from Lincoln Street
- Interactive map of the Mary Marshall Row area

General information
- Location: Savannah, Georgia, U.S., 230–244 East Oglethorpe Avenue
- Coordinates: 32.076321°N 81.089534°W
- Completed: 1856 (170 years ago)

Mary Marshall Row is a historic row house in Savannah, Georgia, United States. It stands at 230–244 East Oglethorpe Avenue, overlooking Colonial Park Cemetery from the north. They are contributing properties of the Savannah Historic District, itself on the National Register of Historic Places.

The properties were built as rental properties for Mary Magdalene Marshall, a noted investor and philanthropist, between 1855 and 1856. They were designed by Charles Cluskey.

In 1959, the demolition of the properties was prevented by the Historic Savannah Foundation. It purchased the land for $45,000 and offered the demolisher $9,000, a $3,000 profit on the value of the building's Savannah gray bricks.

Other similar-style row houses exist in Savannah's Gordon Row, the Jones Street Quantock Row, the Chatham Square Quantock Row, William Remshart Row House and McDonough Row.

== See also ==
- Buildings in Savannah Historic District
