= Alfred Haywood (merchant) =

English merchant and public servant

- Born: 10 November 1817; Oxford, Oxfordshire, England
- Died: 8 December 1893 (aged 76); Savannah, Georgia, U.S.
- Resting place: Laurel Grove Cemetery, Savannah, Georgia, U.S.
- Occupation: merchant
- Spouse(s): Mary Fagan (1834–1852; her death); Georgianna Helen Trenholm (1859–1877; her death); Harriet Elizabeth Guerard (1879–1893; his death)

Alfred Haywood (10 November 1817 – 8 December 1893) was an English merchant and public servant in Savannah, Georgia, where he lived for almost fifty years. He served on Savannah's city council for several years, and was the city's acting mayor for a period.

== Life and career ==
Haywood was born in 1817 in Oxford, England, to Ebenezer and Elizabeth Haywood.

He married for the first time, to Ireland native Mary Fagan, on 2 February 1834. They emigrated to New York shortly afterwards where they lived with Alfred's father. His brother, Ebenezer, had also moved there with his wife Sophia.

Alfred and Mary had two children, Margaret (born 1835) and Ebenezer (1837), before relocating to Savannah, Georgia, in 1845. His brother, Joseph, was already living there but died four years before their arrival.

Haywood began in the grocery trade, before forming a partnership in the ice business with Charles O. Gage of Massachusetts. Their business was very successful, but the outbreak of the Civil War caused the suspension of ice shipments from the north, and the partnership was dissolved in 1862.

Mary died in 1852 at the age of 40, and his son died five years later, from injuries sustained in a buggy accident.

His daughter died in 1859. The same year, on 25 August, he remarried, to Georgianna (Georgia) Helen Trenholm, of Beaufort, South Carolina, with whom he had six more children: Anna Josephine (born 1862), Jane Chennel (1863), William Alfred (1864), George Trenholm (1868), Sarah Oxford (1870) and Harry Oxford (1872). Sarah died in July 1871, aged about eighteen months. Georgianna died while in New York City on 1 June 1877, aged around 45.

During the war, "though of foreign birth, he warmly recognized the justice of the Southern cause, and gave it his loyal and devoted allegiance, and personal service."

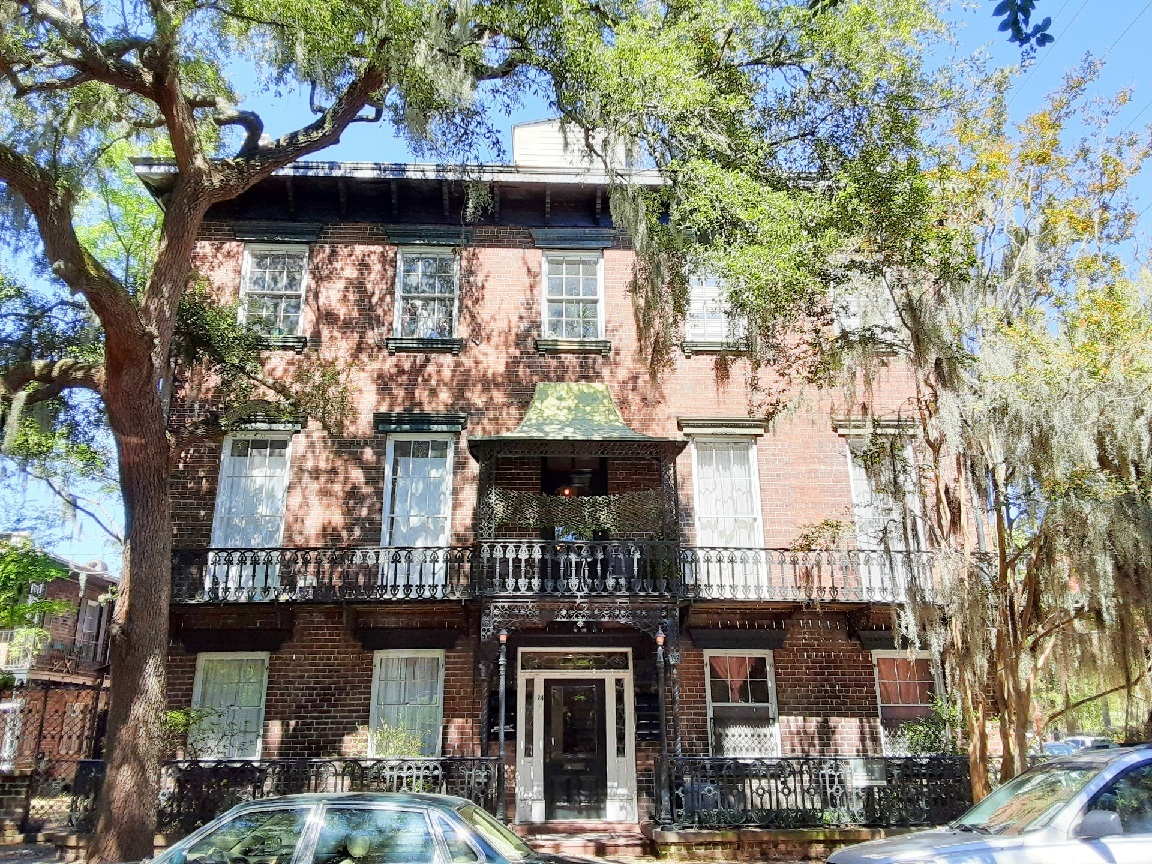
Today's 124 East McDonough Street, which Haywood built in 1861

In 1865, Haywood went into the brick-making business with Adrian V. LaRoche. It lasted two years, with the brickyard being sold in 1867.

The ice business reopened, as Haywood, Gage and Company, after the war. By 1868, it controlled the ice monopoly in Savannah. Haywood remained in the ice business until 1883, when he sold the company's majority to Gage. He retired from the company in 1889.

Haywood was elected to the Savannah city council as an alderman in 1869. He served three terms, the final two of which were as chairman. In November 1871, he became acting mayor of Savannah for a period. He was also influential in the completion of Savannah's sewage system, and was present at the laying of the foundation stone of the city's City Market in 1876. Serving as a representative of the Zerubbabel Lodge #15 F. and A. M. for over thirty years, he was also involved in the laying of the foundation stone at the Bethesda Boy's Home (1870).

As president of the Coast Line Railroad, he officiated at the opening of the Broughton Street line in September 1874. In January 1873, he had written to William Morrill Wadley regarding a proposed bridge over the Savannah–Ogeechee Canal.

In November 1878, he legally adopted his granddaughter, Mary Elizabeth Doherty, after the death of her father, John, who had been a widower for twenty years. Alfred changed her family name Haywood.

A third marriage occurred in 1879, to Harriet Elizabeth Guerard, of Charleston, South Carolina.

Haywood was a longtime member of Savannah's Christ Church in Johnson Square, serving as a vestryman and warden.

He constructed two properties in Savannah: 124 East McDonough Street, which overlooks the western side of Colonial Park Cemetery, and in the adjacent block to the north, 217–219 Abercorn Street.

== Death ==
Haywood died, of paralysis, in Savannah in 1893, aged 76. He is interred in the city's Laurel Grove Cemetery alongside each of his wives. Harriet survived him by 25 years. His brother, Ebenezer, is also buried in Laurel Grove. He predeceased Alfred by seventeen years.

Of Haywood, it was said, "In death, as in life, the merits of Alfred Haywood rest upon a self-reliant, honorable, and unblemished career."
