= Price Street =

Prominent street in Savannah, Georgia

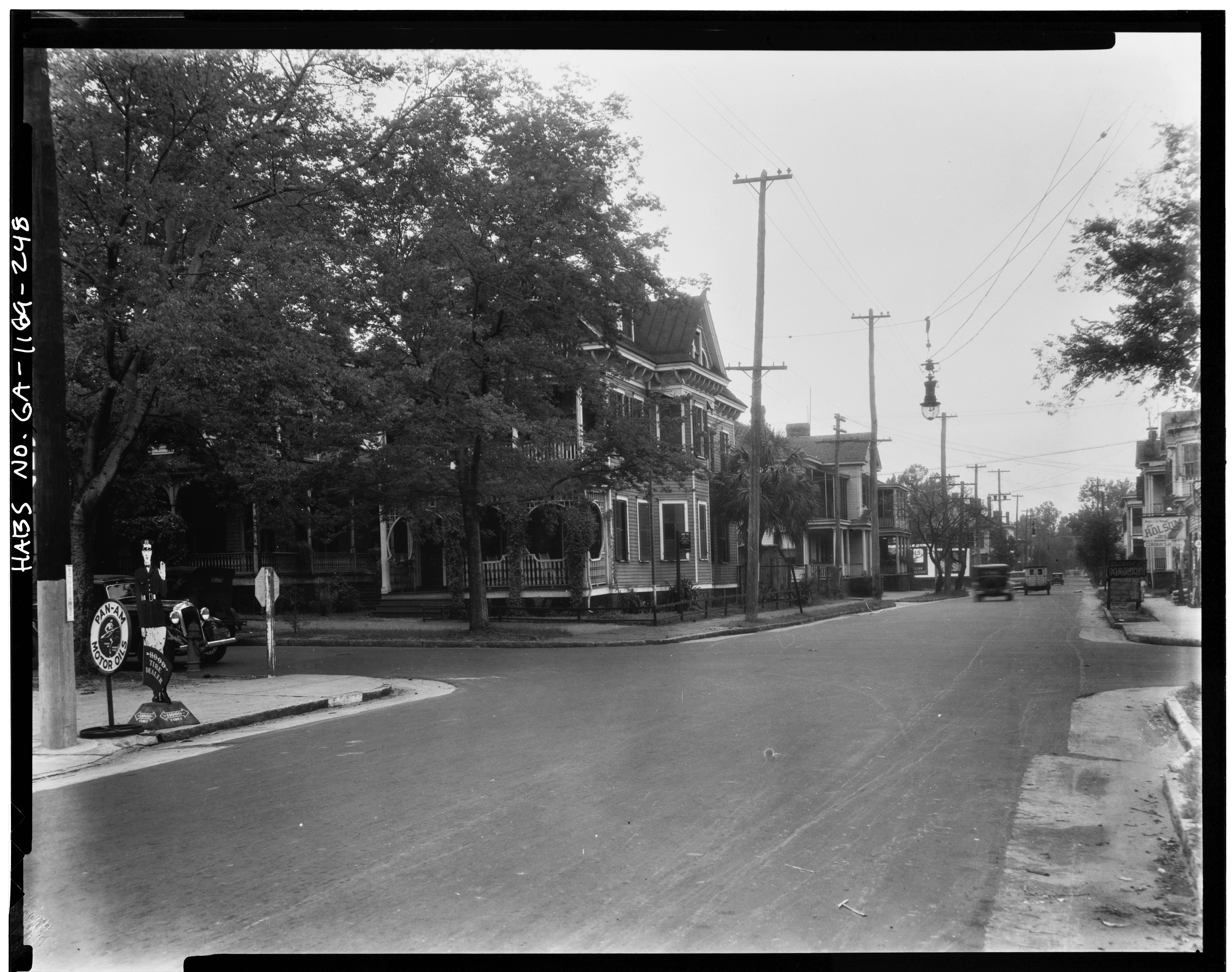
- A 1933 view of Price and East Henry Street in the Dixon Park area of the city
- Namesake: Charles Price
- Length: 2.04 mi (3.28 km)
- Location: Savannah, Georgia, U.S.
- North end: East Bay Street
- South end: East Victory Drive (U.S. Route 80)

Price Street in Savannah, Georgia, United States, is located between Habersham Street to the west and East Broad Street to the east. It runs for about 2.04 miles (3.28 km) from East Bay Street in the north to East Victory Drive (U.S. Route 80) in the south. The street's directional flow is one-way (southbound), with a single lane for motor vehicles and a dedicated lane for cyclists. Its northern section passes through the Savannah Historic District, a National Historic Landmark District. Rosa Lula Barnes owned a grocery store on Price Street.

The street was named for Charles Price, one of the city's earliest lawyers.

Price Street runs beside seven squares. From north to south:

To the west of

- Washington Square
- Greene Square
- Crawford Square

To the east of

- Warren Square
- Columbia Square
- Troup Square
- Whitefield Square

== Notable buildings and structures ==
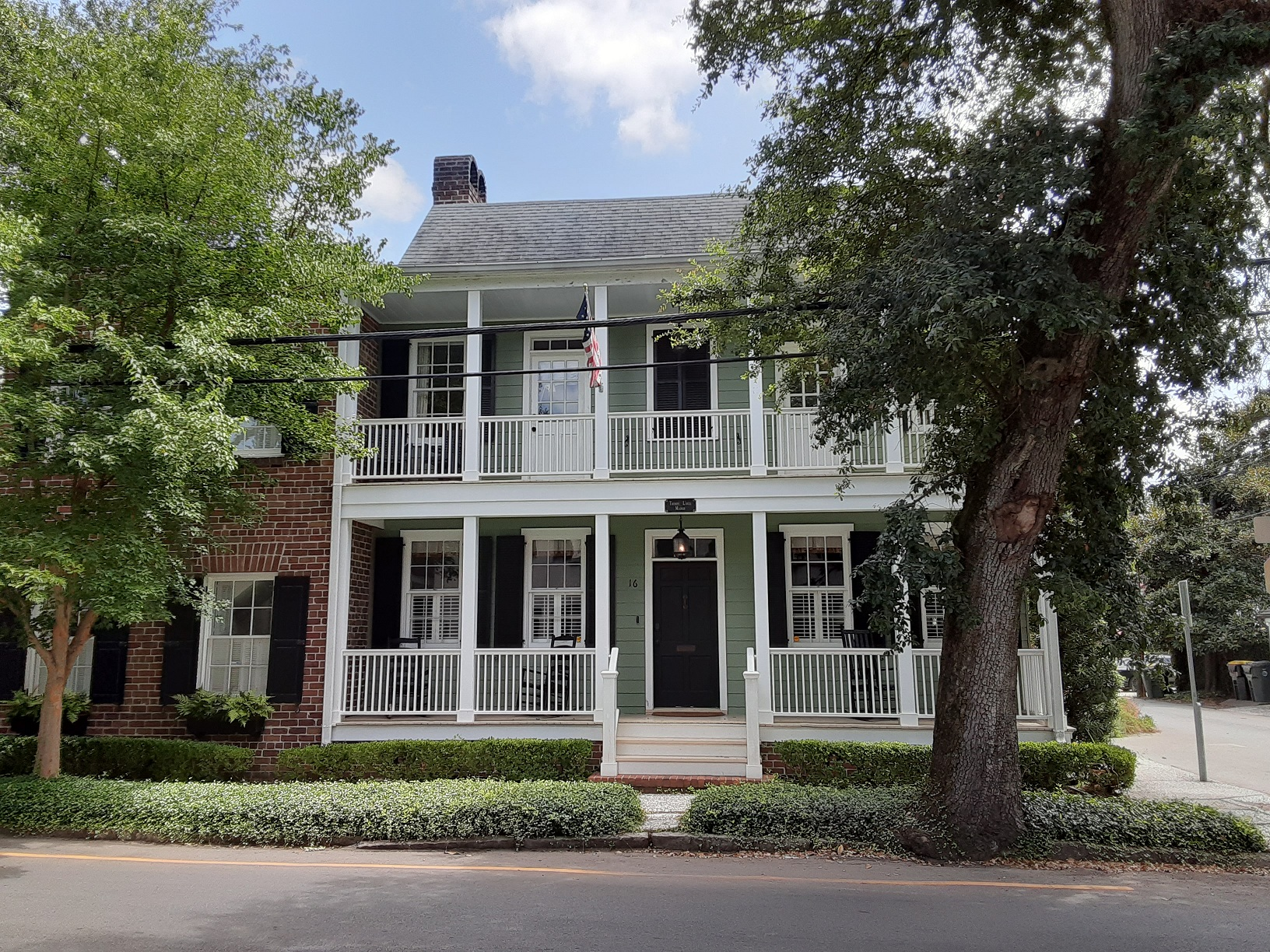
William Williams House, 16 Price Street, which was built by 1809

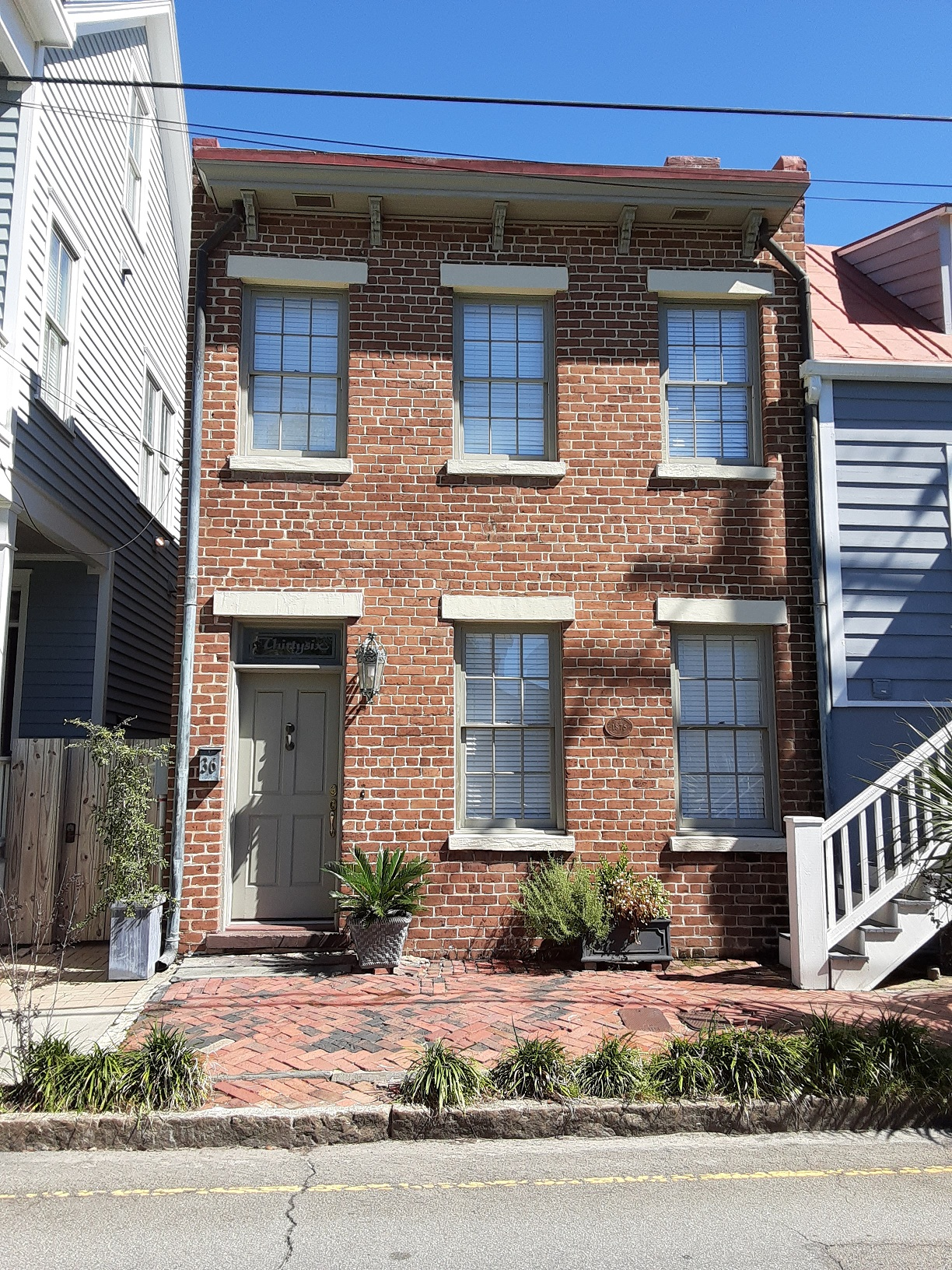
William Wescott House, 36 Price Street, 1874

Below is a selection of notable buildings and structures on Price Street, all in Savannah's Historic District. From north to south:

- D. D. Williams House, 12 Price Street (1816)
- William Williams House, 16 Price Street (by 1809)
- Elizabeth Heery House, 17 Price Street (1857)
- William Wescott House, 36 Price Street (1874)
- Stephen Timmons Cottage, 40 Price Street (1841) – has also been Tommie's Place delicatessen
- Frederick Heineman Property, 140 Price Street (c. 1828)
- 146–148 Price Street (between 1890 and 1898)
- 150–152 Price Street (1890)
- Stewart Austin Row House, 234–244 Price Street (1855)
- 322–328 Price Street (1870)
- Silas Fulton Property, 408–410 Price Street (1860)
- Frederick Wessels Row House, 411–419 Price Street (1876)
- Henry Sulter Row House, 422–428 Price Street (1881)
- Martin Sulter Duplex, 436–438 Price Street (1888)
- Cord Asendorf Property, 443–447 Price Street (1892)
- McMillan Brothers Property, 506–508 Price Street (1893)
- 524–534 Price Street (1893)
- Frederick Wessels Duplex (I), 607–609 Price Street (1891)
- Frederick Wessels Duplex (II), 615–617 Price Street (1892)
