= Habersham Street =

Prominent street in Savannah, Georgia

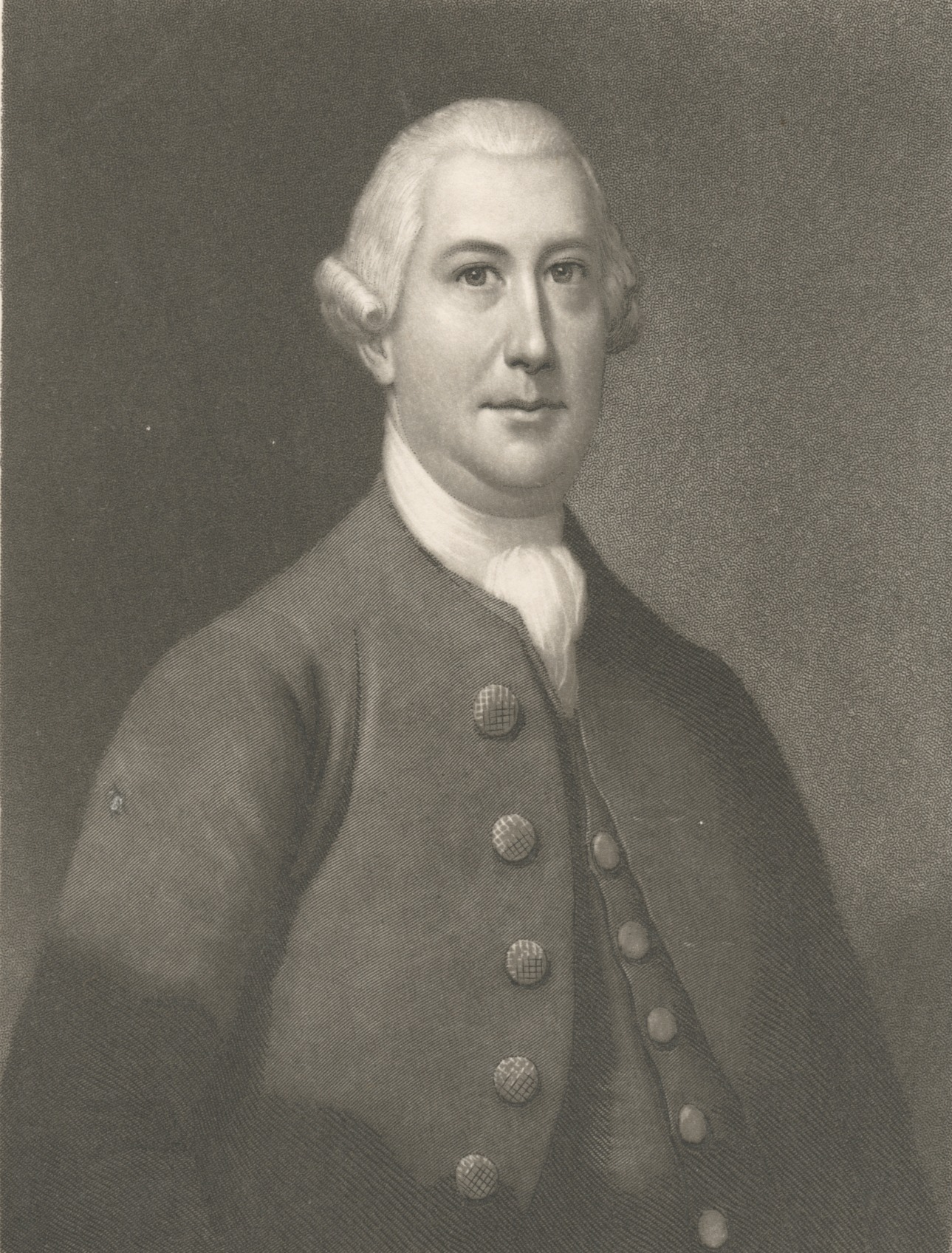
- The street's namesake, James Habersham
- Former name: Prendergast Street (1760)
- Namesake: James Habersham
- Length: 4.82 mi (7.76 km)
- Location: Savannah, Georgia, U.S.
- North end: East Bay Street
- South end: Stephenson Avenue

Habersham Street is a prominent street in Savannah, Georgia, United States. Located between Lincoln Street to the west and Price Street to the east, it runs for about 4.82 miles (7.76 km) from East Bay Street in the north to Stephenson Avenue in the south. The street is named for merchant and statesman James Habersham. It was known as Prendergast Street in 1760. Its northern section passes through the Savannah Historic District, a National Historic Landmark District.

Habersham Street goes around four of Savannah's 22 squares. They are (from north to south):

- Warren Square
- Columbia Square
- Troup Square
- Whitefield Square

Habersham Street also bounds the eastern edge of Colonial Park Cemetery, in which James Habersham was buried upon his death in 1775.

== Notable buildings and structures ==
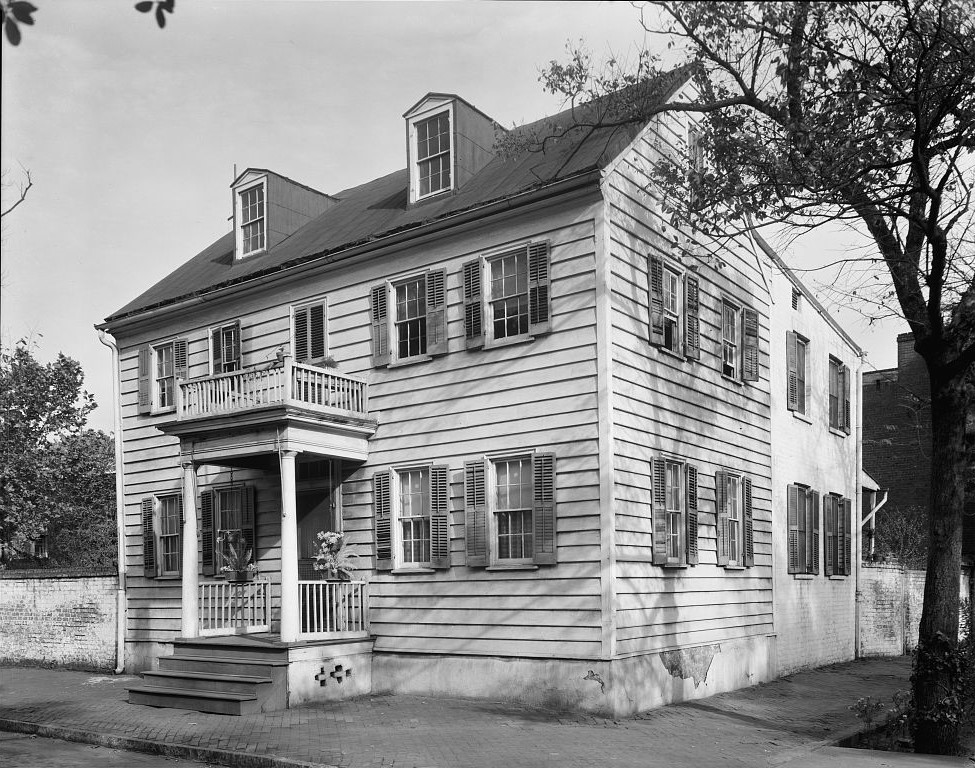
The Spencer–Woodbridge House in Warren Square

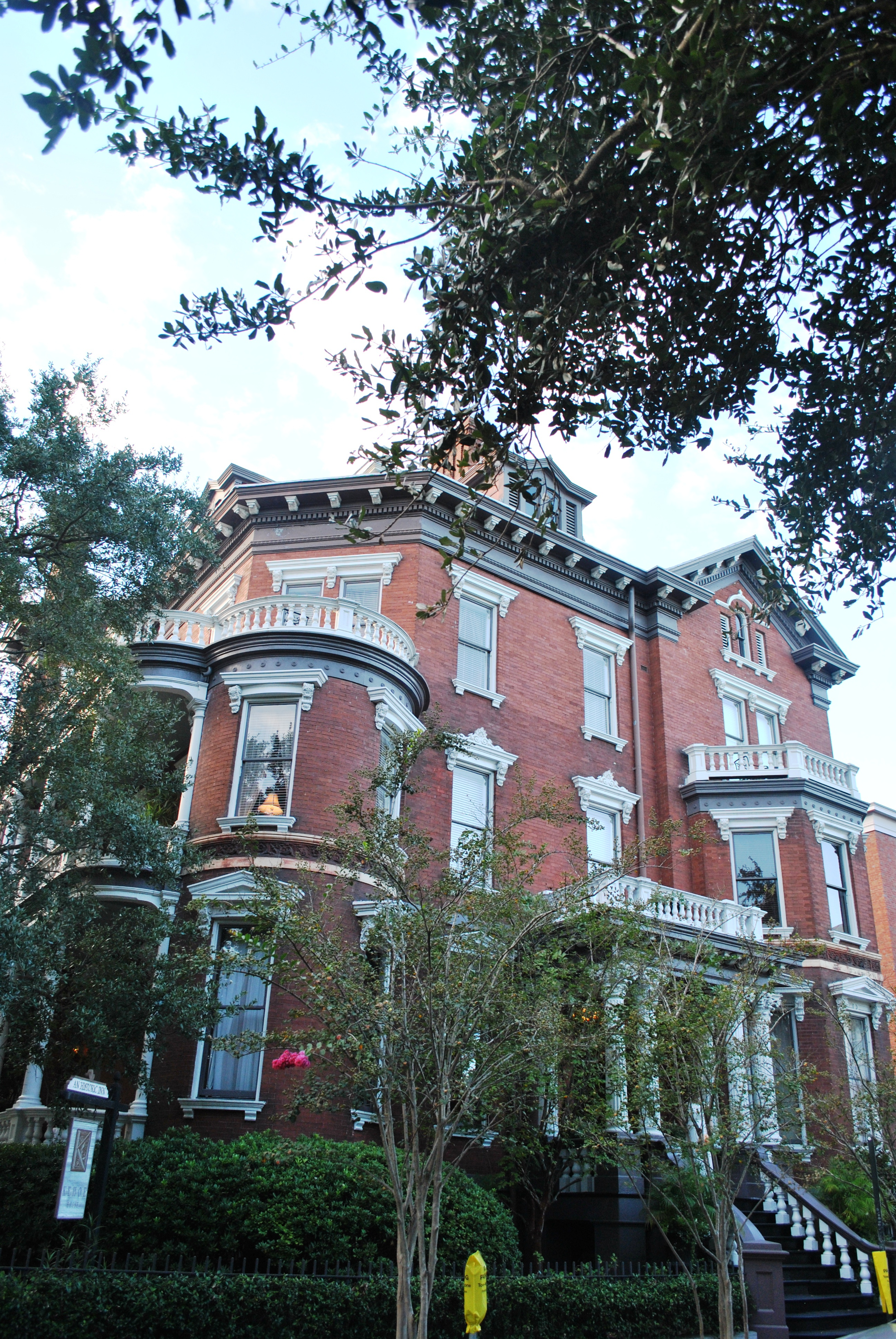
The Kehoe House, Columbia Square

Below is a selection of notable buildings and structures on Habersham Street, all in Savannah's Historic District. From north to south:

- Hugh Cullen Property, 3–5 Habersham Street (1854)
- Paul Hamilton Wilkins House, 7 Habersham Street (between 1791 and 1794)
- John Strous House, 11 Habersham Street (1852)
- [The first few homes on the eastern side of the street were demolished in the mid-20th century]
- Spencer–Woodbridge House, 22 Habersham Street (between 1790 and 1804)
- John David Mongin House, 24 Habersham Street (circa 1797)
- Harry Schroder Duplex, 32–34 Habersham Street (1898)
- Kehoe House (II), 123 Habersham Street (1892)
- Frederick Heineman House, 125–127 Habersham Street (1842)
- Green Fleetwood House, 128 Habersham Street (1854)
- Kehoe House (I), 130 Habersham Street (1885)
- The Frederick Ball House, 136 Habersham Street (1805)
- Robert Lawton Duplex, 228–232 Habersham Street (1844)
- Maggie Ritchie House, 234 Habersham Street (1890)
- Former county jail, 235–239 Habersham Street (now Habersham Hall, part of the Savannah College of Art and Design; 1890)
- John Hernandez Property, 310 Habersham Street (1861)
- Cohen Row, 312–320 Habersham Street (1883)
- John Kenney House, 319 East Charlton Street (its entrance is on Habersham; 1870)
- Unitarian Universalist Church, 321 Habersham Street (1851)
- George Hawkins House, 410 Habersham Street (1892)
- First Congregational Church, 421 Habersham Street (1895)
- 424 Habersham Street (1896)
- 426 Habersham Street (1896)
- Mary Dwyer Triplex, 427–431 Habersham Street (1886)
- John Powers Duplex, 430–432 Habersham Street (1887)
- John Entelman Property (I), 433 Habersham Street (1896)
- John Entelman Property (II), 435 Habersham Street (1896)
- John Entelman Property (III), 437 Habersham Street (1897)
- Sarah Sexton Property, 440 Habersham Street (1902)
- Emeline Lee Property (I), 602 Habersham Street (1889–1892)
- Emeline Lee Property (II), 604 Habersham Street (1889–1892)
- Emeline Lee Property (III), 606 Habersham Street (1892)

An outlet of River Street Sweets is located at 4515 Habersham Street.

== References in popular culture ==
The street is also featured several times in John Berendt's 1994 book Midnight in the Garden of Good and Evil. In the subsequent 1997 movie, The Lady Chablis walks from her East Liberty Street home to the Myra Bishop Family Clinic, which was located at 311 Habersham Street, about 500 feet away.
