= Rosa Lula Barnes =

American businesswoman

- Born: August 22, 1868; Huntsville, Alabama, U.S.
- Died: 1917
- Occupations: Grocer, real estate investor, community leader
- Spouse: Richard Barnes (m. 1884)

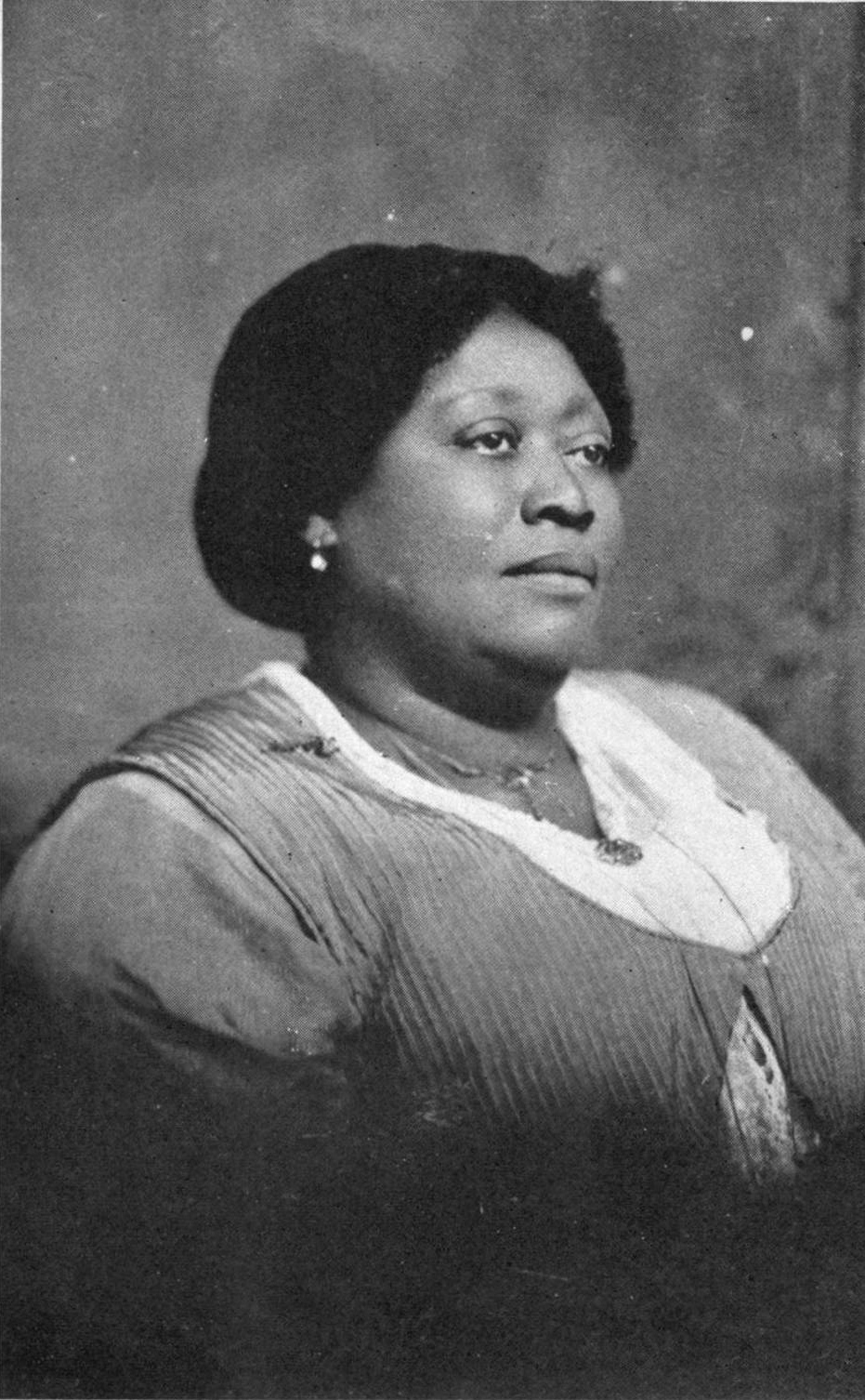

Rosa Lula Barnes (August 22, 1868 – 1917) was a grocer, real estate investor and community leader in Savannah, Georgia, United States.

== Biography ==
Barnes was born in Huntsville, Alabama, in 1868 and was educated at Huntsville Normal and Industrial Institute. She moved to Savannah, Georgia, where she married Richard Barnes in 1884 and opened a grocery store on Price Street, running the business for ten years until it closed in 1893. During this time, she invested in real state and stock as well as serving as the Director to the Wage Earner’s Bank of Savannah and the Afro-American Company. She was a leader in the Order of Calanthe, the women's auxiliary organization to the Knights of Pythias of North America, South America, Europe, Asia, Africa and Australia.

Her husband died in 1911. She died in 1917.

Barnes owned a residence on East Henry Street, twelve rental houses and five vacant lots in Savannah.
