= Spencer–Woodbridge House =

Historic house in Savannah, Georgia

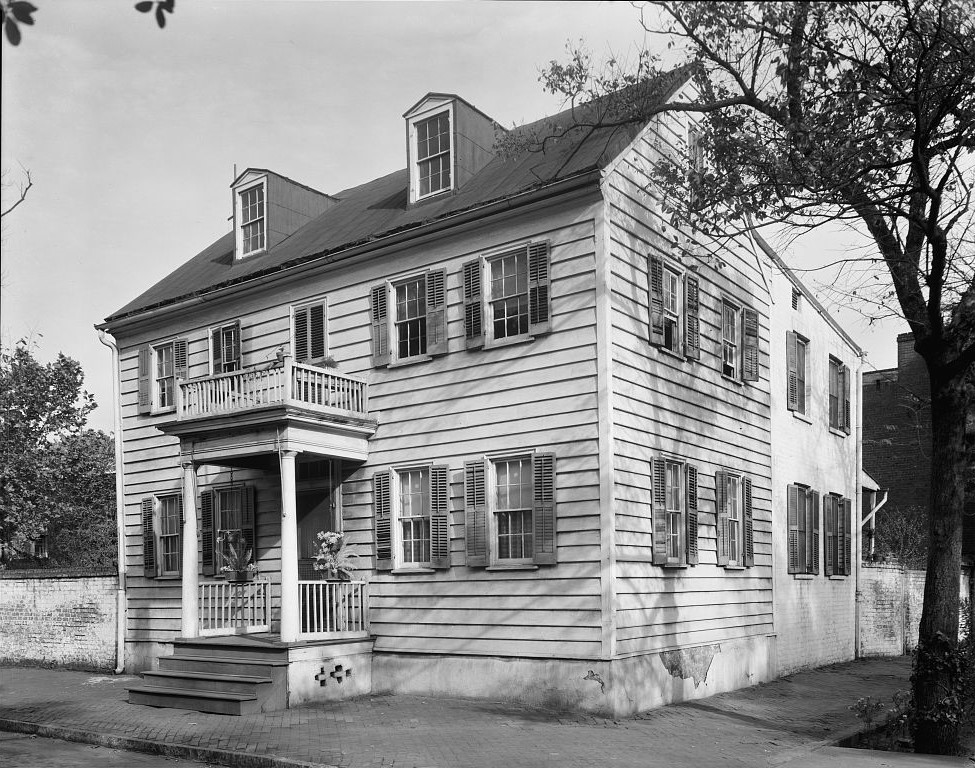
- The building in the mid-20th century
- Interactive map of the Spencer–Woodbridge House area

General information
- Location: Savannah, Georgia, U.S., 22 Habersham Street
- Coordinates: 32.0788°N 81.0868°W
- Completed: 1790 (236 years ago)

Technical details
- Floor count: 4 (including basement)
- Floor area: 2,930 sq ft (272 m^{2})

The Spencer–Woodbridge House (also known as the George Basil Spencer House) is a home in Savannah, Georgia, United States. It is located in the northeastern civic block of Warren Square and was built in 1790, making it the oldest building on the square and one of the oldest in Savannah overall. It is part of the Savannah Historic District, and was built for George Basil Spencer, though he died in February 1791. It also became the homes of William H. Spencer (believed to have built the house) until 1817 and William Woodbridge, who bought it from Spencer. It remained in the Woodbridge family until 1911.

The home is a four-storey wood-frame building with a brick addition at the rear. It has a single-storey porch along the rear of the house and a single-bay Doric entrance porch on Habersham Street.

The building was saved by the revolving fund of the Historic Savannah Foundation. In a survey for the foundation, Mary Lane Morrison found the building to be of significant status. It was restored by Mills B. Lane IV in 1993.

In 2021, the property was listed with Sotheby's International Realty for $2.8 million.

== See also ==
- Buildings in Savannah Historic District
