= John David Mongin House =

Historic house in Savannah, Georgia

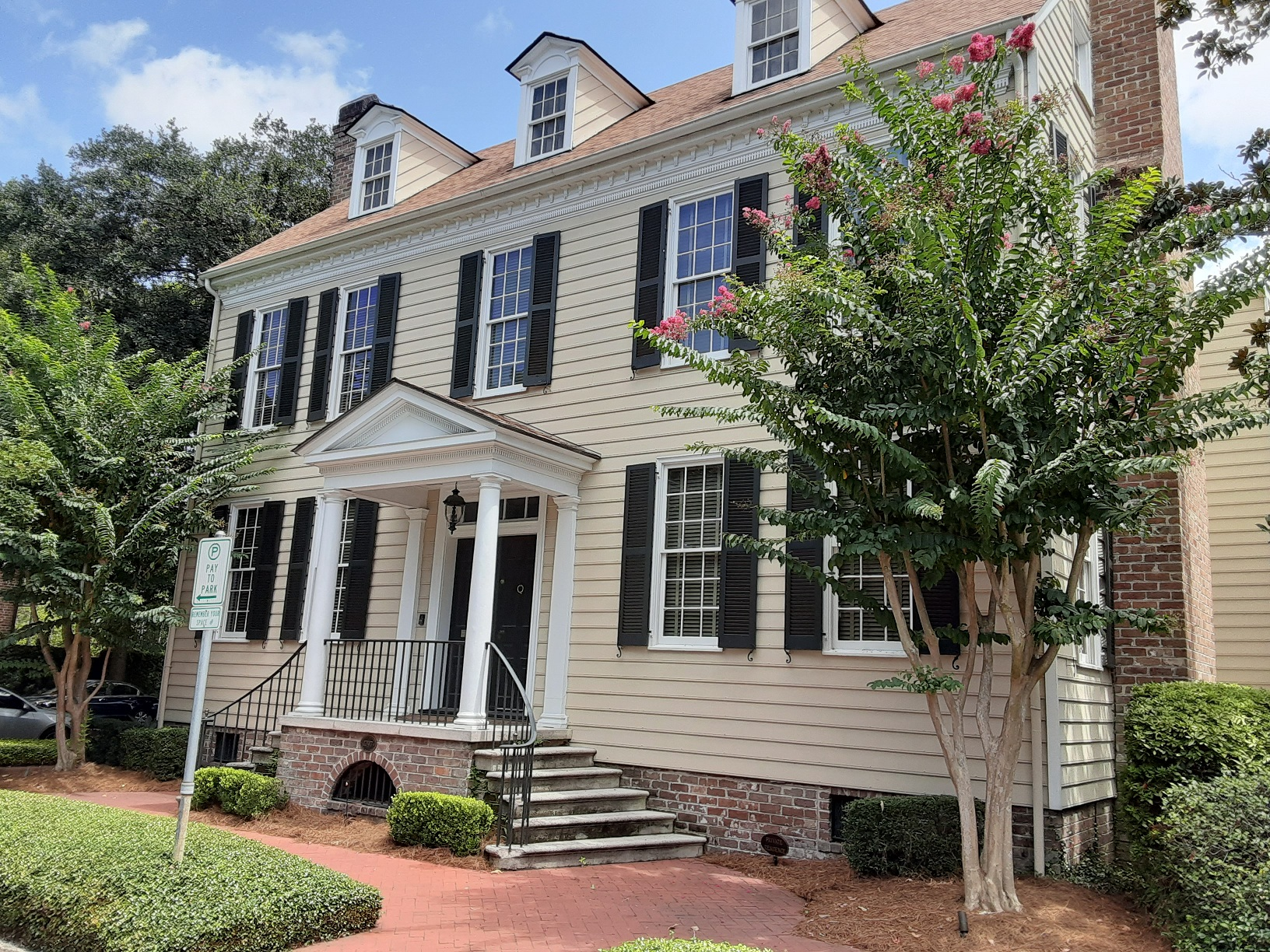
- The building in 2021
- Interactive map of the John David Mongin House area
- Former names: Capital Dwelling House

General information
- Location: Savannah, Georgia, U.S., 24 Habersham Street
- Coordinates: 32.07849941°N 81.08695567°W
- Completed: c. 1797 (229 years ago)

The John David Mongin House is a historic home in Savannah, Georgia, United States. It is located at 24 Habersham Street in the southeastern civic lot of Warren Square. Built around 1797, six years after the square was established, it is one of the few surviving 18th-century buildings in Savannah.

The home, which was moved across the square from 25 Habersham Street, is part of the Savannah Historic District. It was built for John David Mongin (1763–1833), a prominent merchant and known slave owner. It later became a rectory for Christ Church in Savannah's Johnson Square, then a hospital during the yellow fever pandemic of 1876.

Gilbert du Motier, Marquis de Lafayette, visited the property in 1825.

== See also ==
- Buildings in Savannah Historic District
