= Crawford Square (Savannah, Georgia) =

Public square in Savannah, Georgia

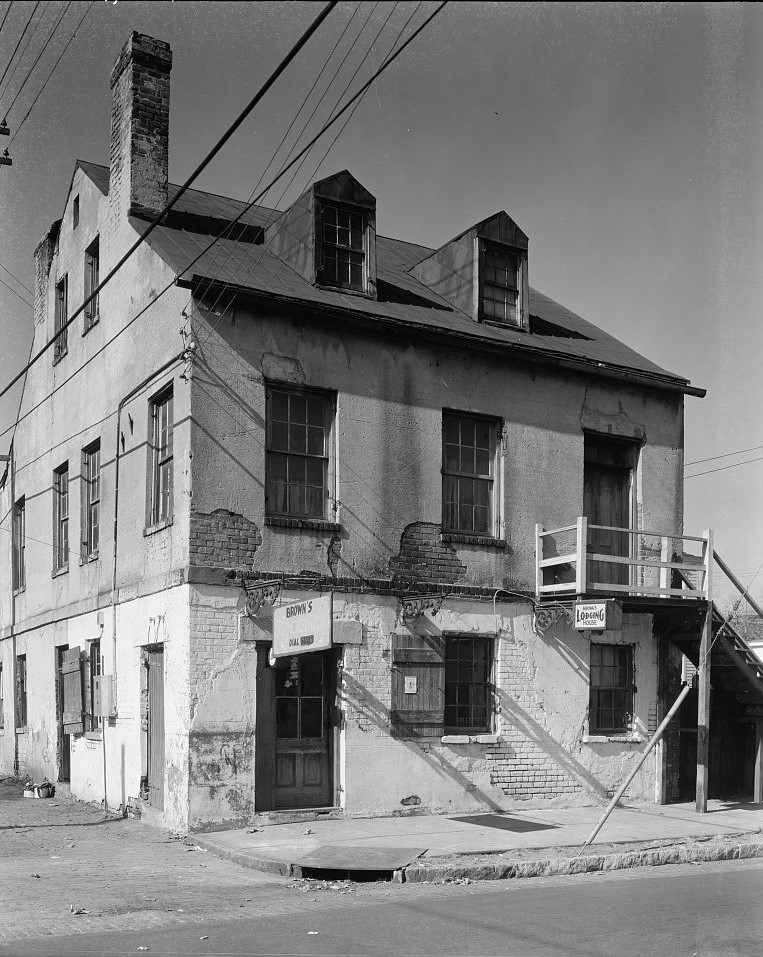
- 242 Price Street, now demolished
- Interactive map of Crawford Square
- Namesake: William Harris Crawford
- Maintained by: City of Savannah
- Location: Savannah, Georgia, U.S.
- Coordinates: 32.0742°N 81.0868°W
- North: Houston Street
- East: East McDonough Street
- South: Houston Street
- West: East McDonough Street

Construction
- Completion: 1841 (185 years ago)

Crawford Square is one of the 22 squares of Savannah, Georgia, United States. It is located in the middle row of the city's five rows of squares, on Houston Street and East McDonough Street, and was laid out in 1841. It is south of Greene Square and east of Colonial Park Cemetery on the eastern edge of the Savannah Historic District. The oldest building on the square is at 224 Houston Street, which dates to 1850.

Crawford Square is named in honor of Secretary of the Treasury William Harris Crawford. Crawford ran for the U.S. presidency in 1824 but came in third, behind John Quincy Adams and runner-up Andrew Jackson.

Although Crawford is the smallest of the squares, it anchors the largest ward, as Crawford Ward includes the territory of Colonial Park Cemetery.

During the era of Jim Crow, this was the only square in which African-Americans were permitted.

The square contains playground facilities, a basketball court, and a gazebo.

While all squares were once fenced, it is the only one that remains so. Crawford Square has also retained its cistern, a holdover from early fire fighting practices. After a major fire in 1820 firemen maintained duty stations in the squares, each of which was equipped with a storage cistern.

The Lady Chablis lived in the square prior to her rise to fame after her appearance in John Berendt's non-fiction novel Midnight in the Garden of Good and Evil.

== Dedication ==
Namesake	Image	Note
William H. Crawford		The square is named for William H. Crawford (1772–1834), United States Senator.

== Constituent buildings ==
Each building below is in one of the eight blocks around the square composed of four residential "tything" blocks and four civic ("trust") blocks, now known as the Oglethorpe Plan. They are listed with construction years where known.

Northwestern civic/trust lot

- 225 Houston Street
- 504–508 East McDonough Street
- 510 East McDonough Street

Southwestern civic/trust lot

- 227–231 Houston Street
- 501–503 East McDonough Street (1890)
- 505–507 East McDonough Street (1890)
- 232 Price Street

Southwestern residential/tything lot

- 505–515 East Perry Street (1852)
- James Roberts Row House, 517–523 East Perry Street (1871)
- Stewart Austin Row House, 234–244 Price Street (1855)

Northeastern residential/tything lot

- 214–222 Houston Street (1910)
- 415 East Hull Street
- 215 East Broad Street

Northeastern civic/trust lot

- John Tucker Property, 224 Houston Street (1850) – oldest building on the square
- 548–550 East McDonough Street (1870) – the Present Hotel (as of 2022)
- 221 East Broad Street

Southeastern civic/trust lot

- 230 Houston Street
- 543 East McDonough Street
- 540–544 East Perry Street
- 227–229 East Broad Street

Southeastern residential/tything lot

- 531 East Perry Street
- 533–539 East Perry Street
- 543–547 East Perry Street
- 235–239 East Broad Street (1890)
- 241–243 East Broad Street (1895)
- 539 East Perry Lane

== Gallery ==
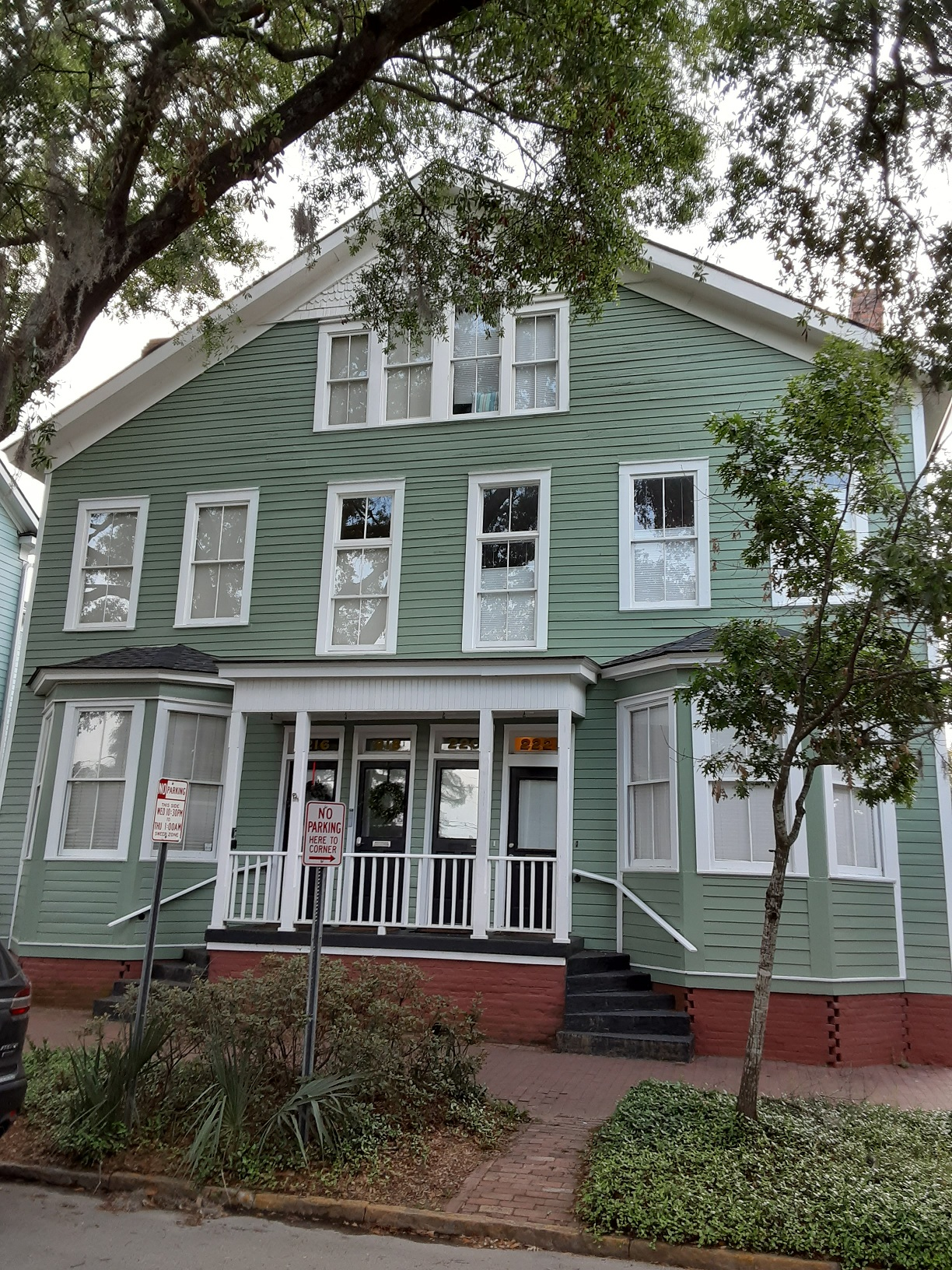
216–222 Houston Street

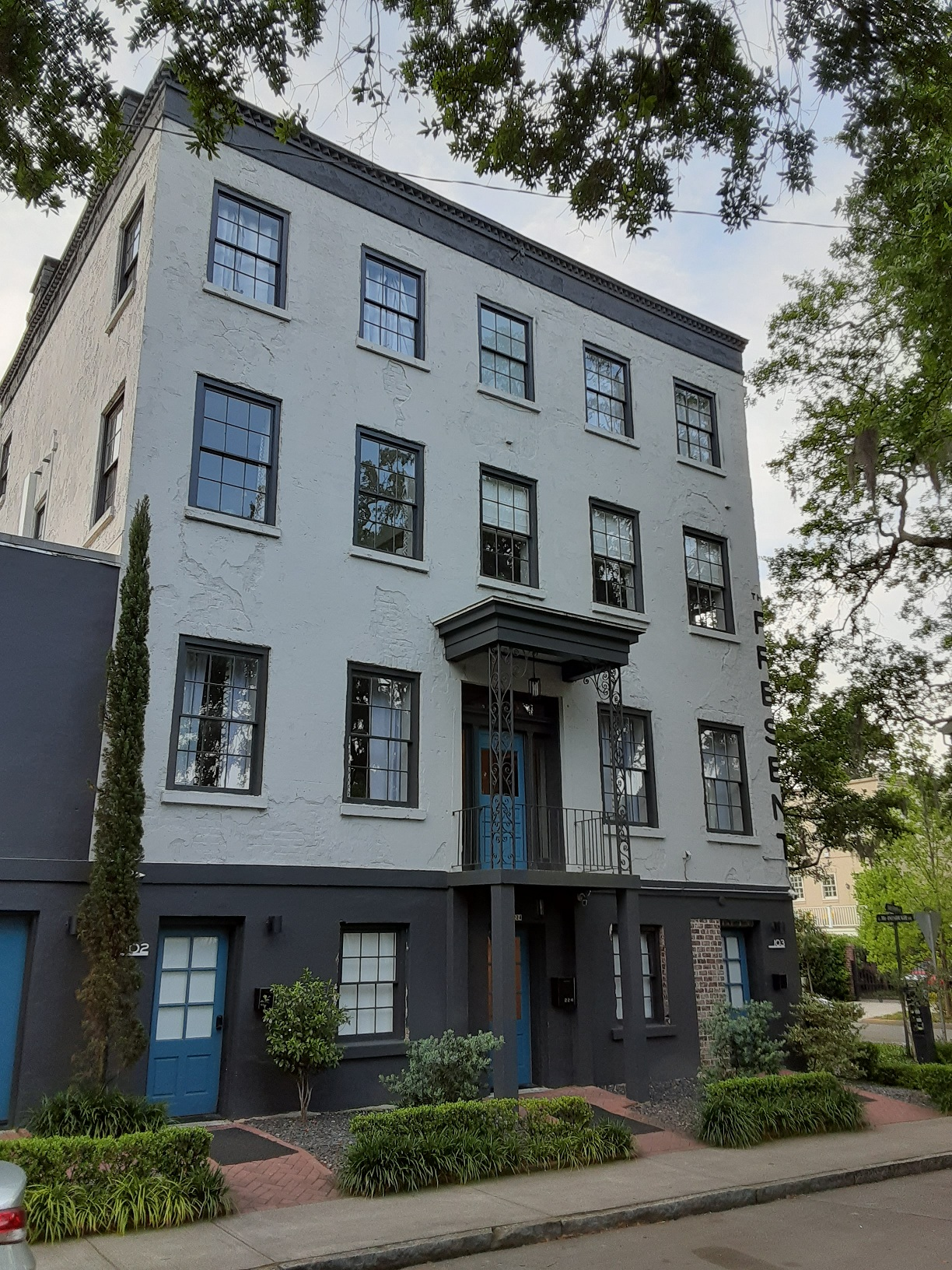
John Tucker Property, 224 Houston Street

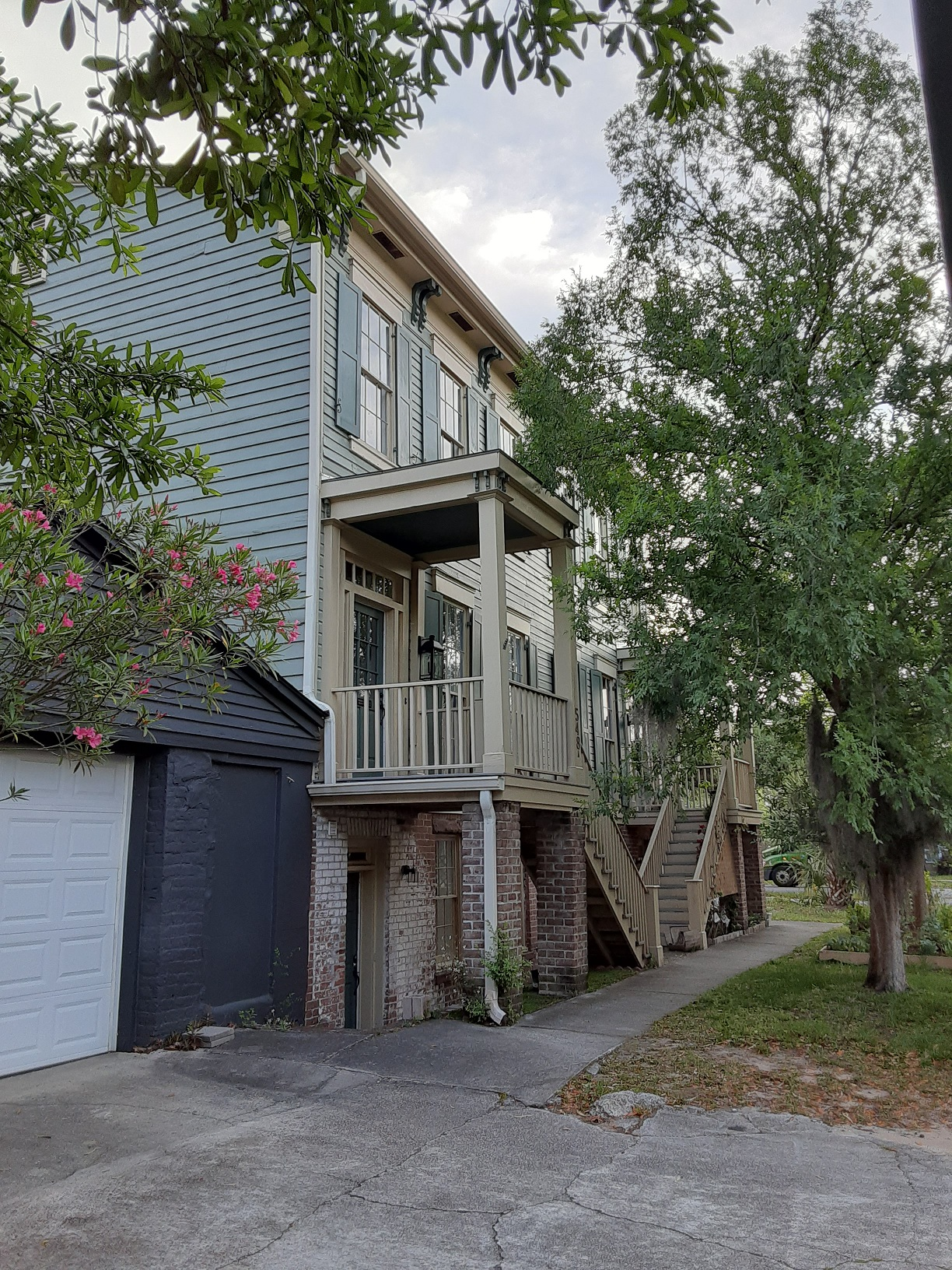
548–550 East McDonough Street

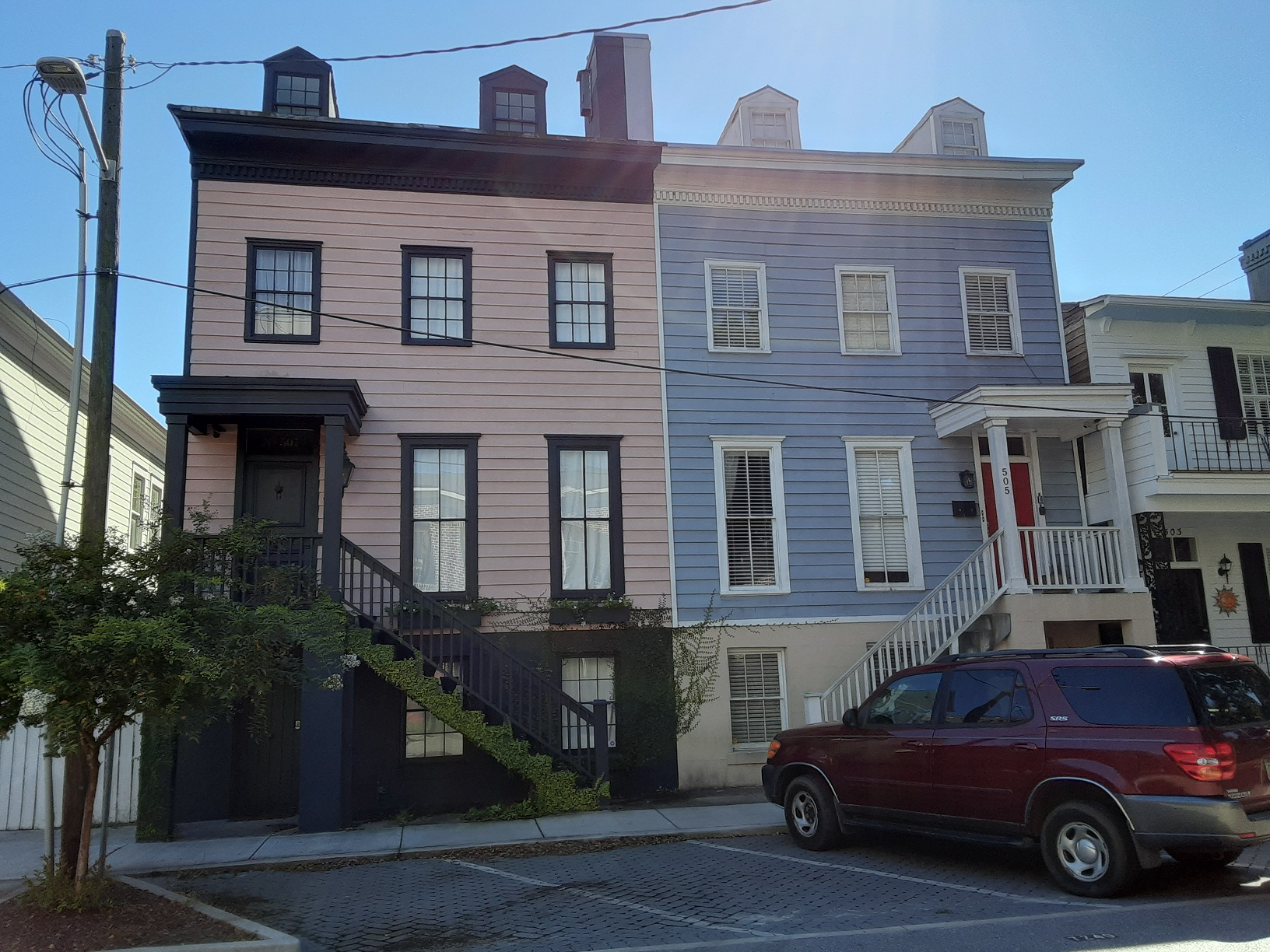
505–507 East McDonough Street

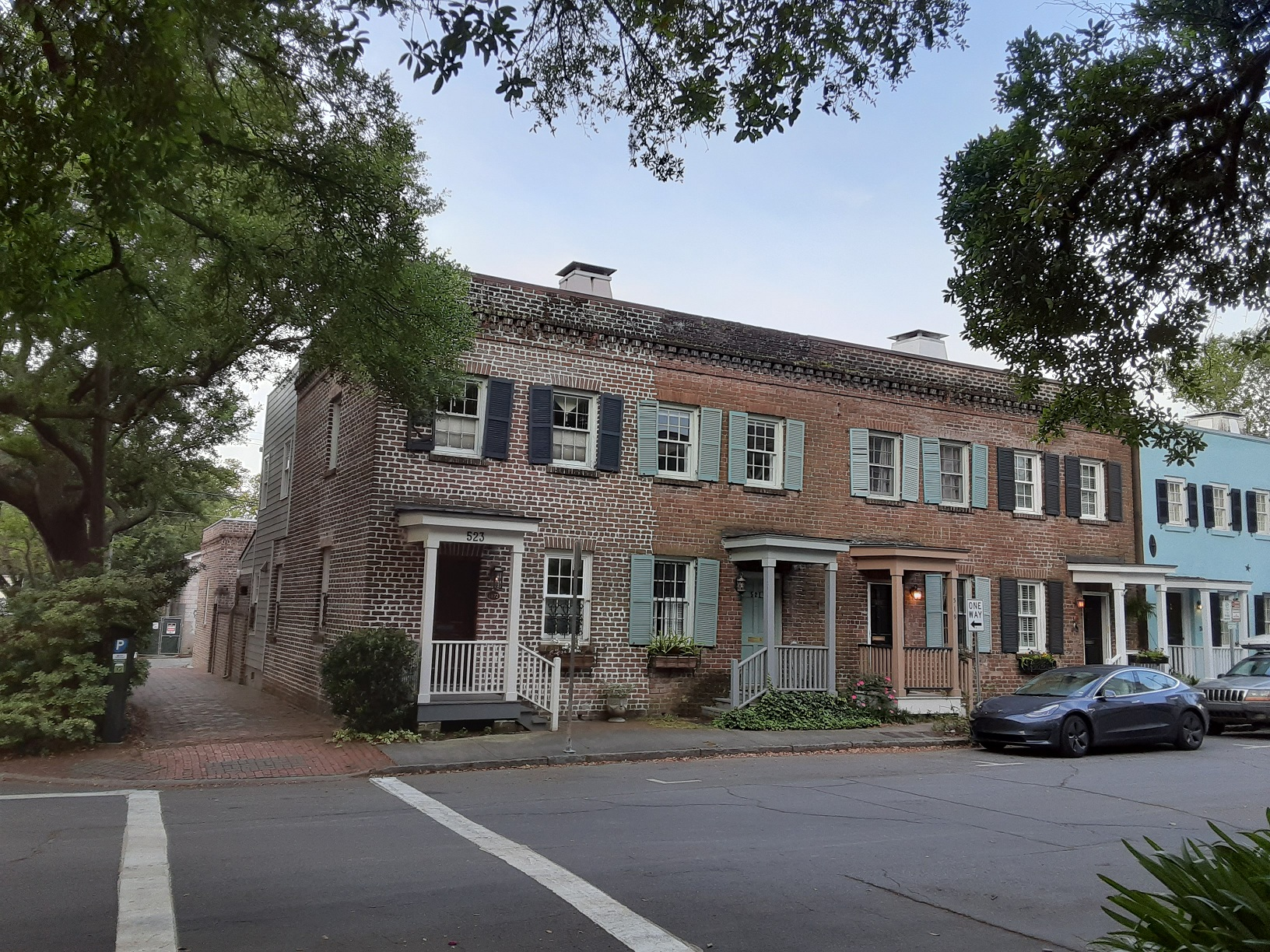
James Roberts Row House, 517–523 East Perry Street

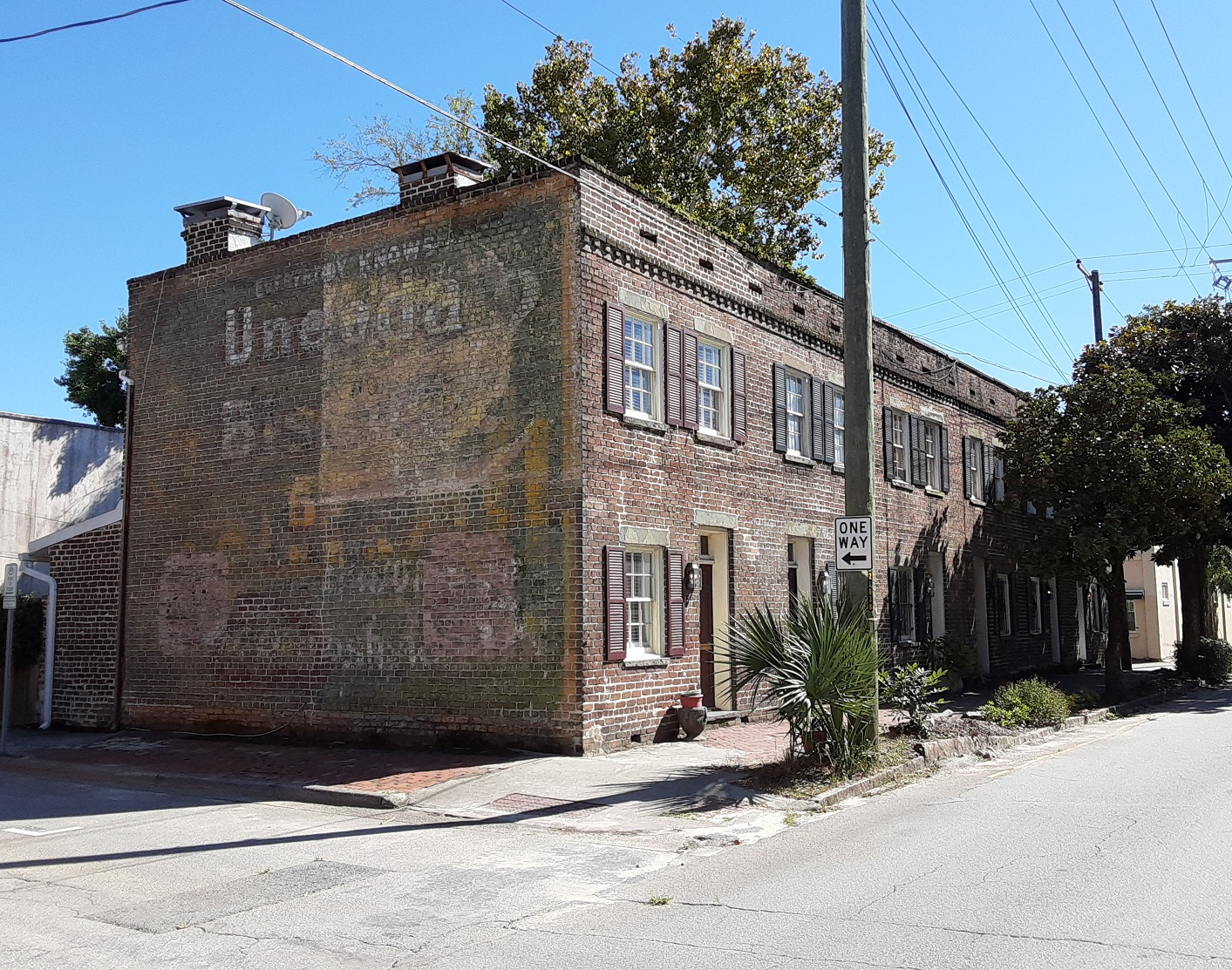
Stewart Austin Row House, 234–244 Price Street
