= Margaret Pendergast House =

Historic house in Savannah, Georgia

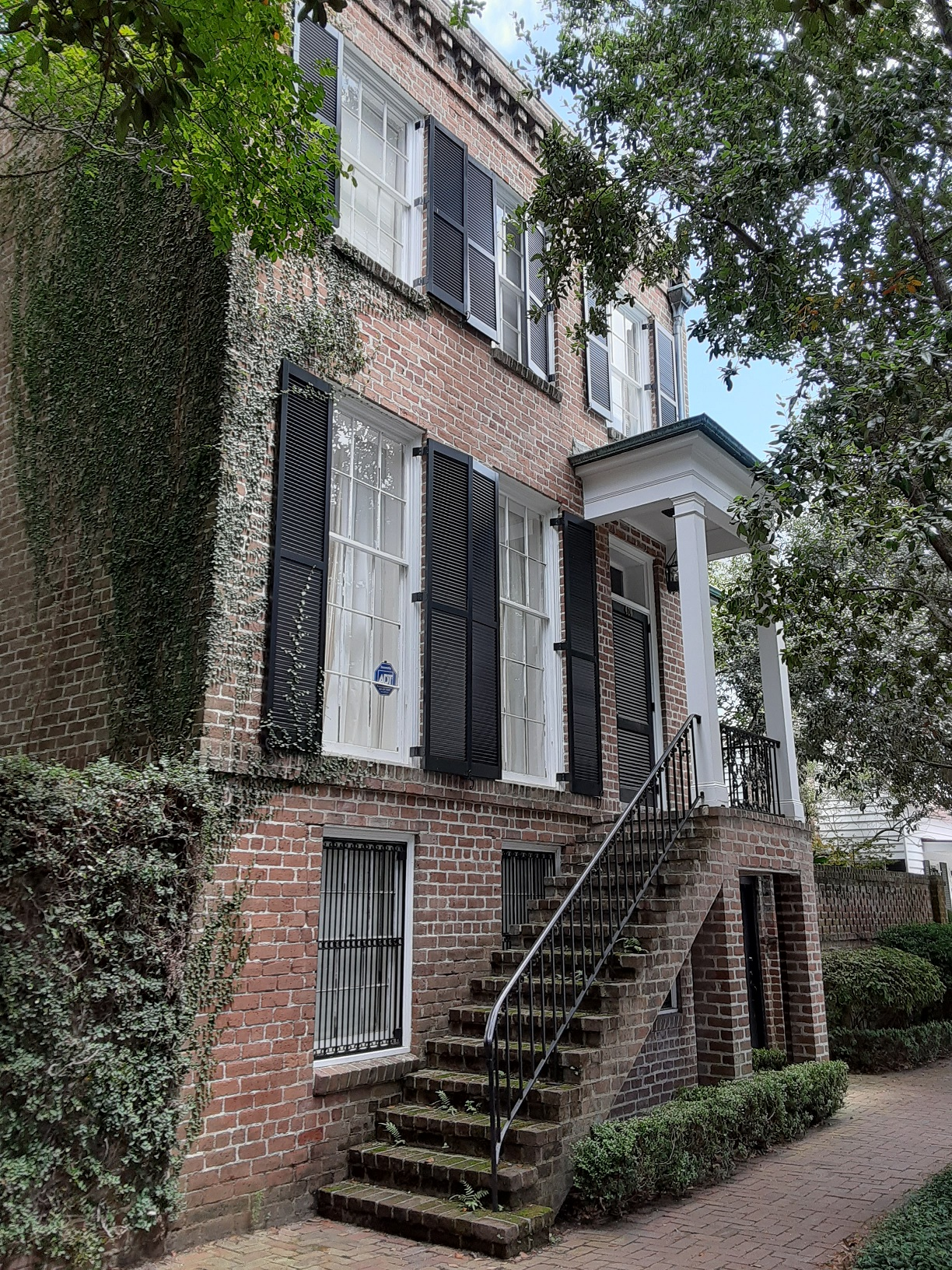
- The building in 2021
- Interactive map of the Margaret Pendergast House area

General information
- Location: Savannah, Georgia, U.S., 420 East St. Julian Street
- Coordinates: 32.07873°N 81.08660°W
- Completed: circa 1868 (158 years ago)

Technical details
- Floor count: 3

The Margaret Pendergast House is a home in Savannah, Georgia, United States. It is located in the northeastern civic block of Warren Square, and was built by 1868. It is part of the Savannah Historic District, and was built for Margaret Pendergast. The home is a three-storey brick structure.

In a survey for the Historic Savannah Foundation, Mary Lane Morrison found the building to be of significant status. It was restored in the 20th century by Anne and Mills Lane, who also lived there. It was the first of many restorations in Savannah for the Laneses. Their son, Mills IV, later changed the stoop and added a side porch.

== Margaret Pendergast ==
Margaret Pendergast was born Margaret Ann Gray on July 31, 1817, in Whitemarsh Island, Georgia, to Tobias V. Gray and Ann Margaret Hartstein. When Margaret was eight years old, her mother drowned in the Savannah River, leaving Margaret as the lady of the house and to take care of her three-year-old brother, George.

At the age of 16, she married Pierce Butler Pendergast on February 6, 1834, at the Lutheran Church of the Ascension. Living at 20 East St. Julian Street, they had two children: Margaret Ann and Susan Robertson. Pierce died on April 15, 1850. Margaret died on July 6, 1872, aged 54.

== See also ==
- Buildings in Savannah Historic District
