= Paul Hamilton Wilkins House =

Historic house in Savannah, Georgia

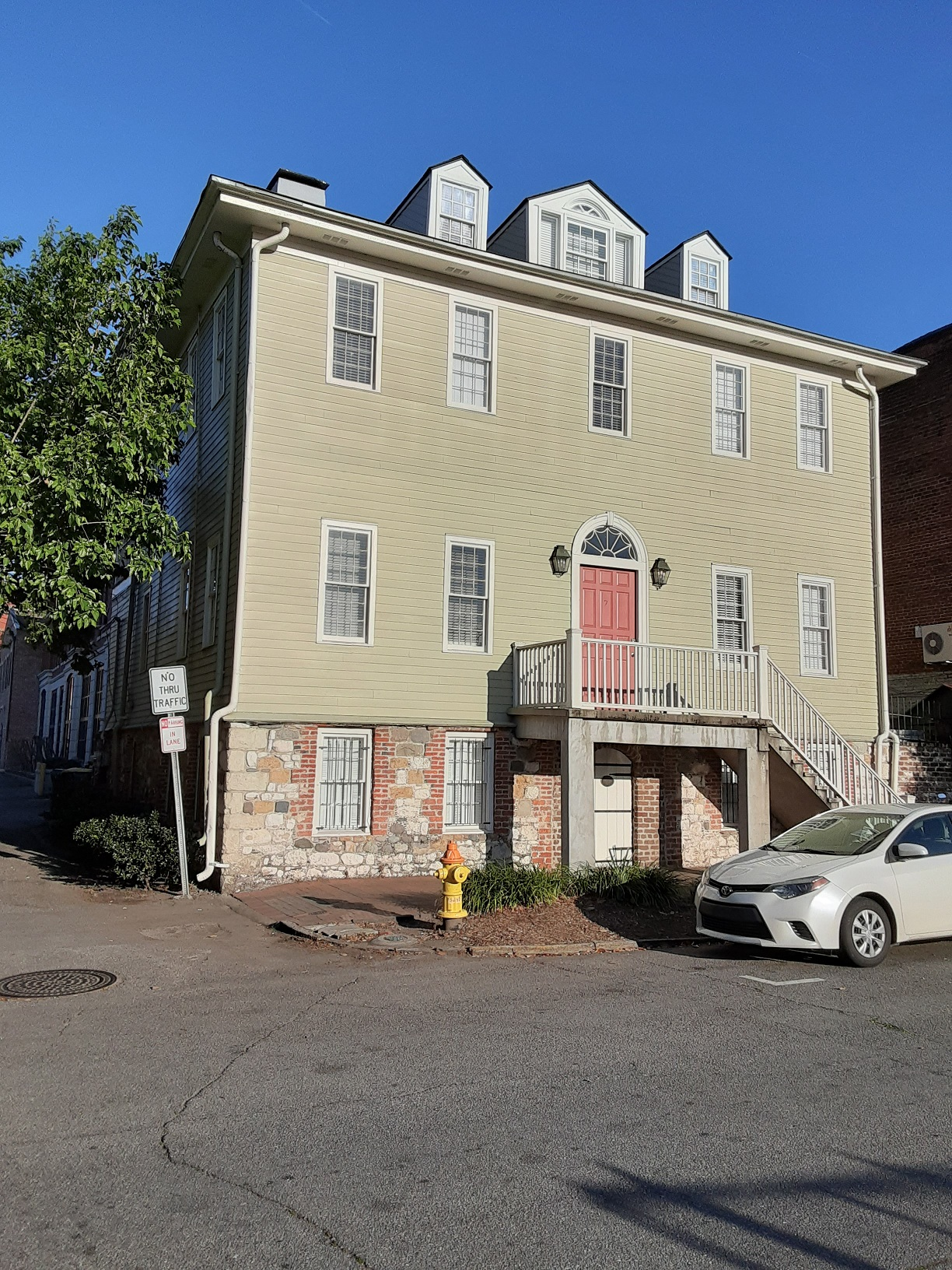
- The building in 2022
- Interactive map of the Paul Hamilton Wilkins House area

General information
- Location: Savannah, Georgia, U.S., 7 Habersham Street
- Coordinates: 32.0795418706°N 81.0871622°W
- Completed: circa 1792 (234 years ago)

Technical details
- Floor count: 3

The Paul Hamilton Wilkins House is a historic home in Savannah, Georgia, United States. It is located at 7 Habersham Street, at its intersection with East Bay Lane, and was built around 1792. One of the oldest extant buildings in Savannah, it is now part of the Savannah Historic District. In a survey for the Historic Savannah Foundation, Mary Lane Morrison found the building to be of significant status.

It was built for Dr. Paul Hamilton Wilkins. Wilkins formerly lived in Liberty County, Georgia. His young son died, and with his wife in great distress he decided that the family should go back to visit Philadelphia. They sailed from Savannah on the SS Pulaski, which sank in a hurricane off Cape Hatteras, North Carolina, in June 1838. Most of the passengers drowned, including the Wilkins family of three.

In the mid-19th century, the property was owned by Hugh Cullens. It is believed it was part of his Seaman's Boarding House at 3–5 Habersham Street.

== See also ==
- Buildings in Savannah Historic District
