= Warren Square (Savannah, Georgia) =

Public square in Savannah, Georgia

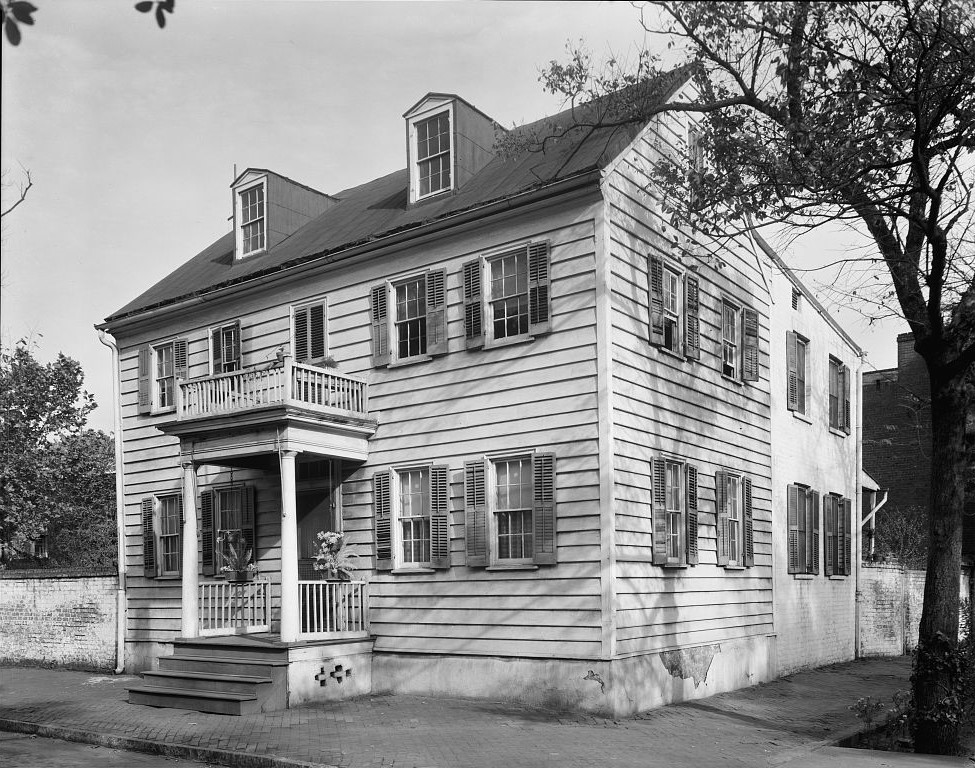
- The Spencer–Woodbridge House (1790) stands at 22 Habersham Street
- Interactive map of Warren Square
- Namesake: Joseph Warren
- Maintained by: City of Savannah
- Location: Savannah, Georgia, U.S.
- Coordinates: 32.0787°N 81.0872°W
- North: Habersham Street
- East: East St. Julian Street
- South: Habersham Street
- West: East St. Julian Street

Construction
- Completion: 1791 (235 years ago)

Warren Square is one of the 22 squares of Savannah, Georgia, United States. It is located in the northernmost row of the city's five rows of squares, on Habersham Street and East St. Julian Street. It is east of Reynolds Square, west of Washington Square and north of Columbia Square. The oldest building on the square is the Spencer–Woodbridge House, at 22 Habersham Street, which dates to 1790. The Lincoln Street Parking Garage occupies the entire western side of the square.

The square was laid out in 1791 and is named for General Joseph Warren, a Revolutionary War hero killed at the Battle of Bunker Hill and who had served as president of the Provincial Government of Massachusetts. British gunpowder seized by Savannahians had been sent to aid the Americans at Bunker Hill. The "sister city" relationship between Savannah and Boston survived even the Civil War, and Bostonians sent shiploads of provisions to Savannah shortly after the city surrendered to General Sherman in 1864.

== Dedication ==
Namesake	Image	Note
Joseph Warren		The square is named for Joseph Warren (1741–1775), Revolutionary War hero.

== Constituent buildings ==
Each building below is in one of the eight blocks around the square composed of four residential "tything" blocks and four civic ("trust") blocks, now known as the Oglethorpe Plan. They are listed with construction years where known.

Northwestern residential/tything block

- 324–326 East Bryan Street (1806/1895)
- John Strous House, 11 Habersham Street (1852)
- 302 East Bryan Street (1901–1905)

The Lincoln Street Parking Garage occupies the entire western side of the square.

Southwestern residential/tything block

Although built to look somewhat similar to 324–326 East Bryan Street, directly opposite to the north, 321–323 East Congress Street was built in 1997.

Northeastern residential/tything block

- (Estate of) John Eppinger Property, 404 East Bryan Street (1822) – moved from 211 West Perry Street
- Patrick Shiels House, 410 East Bryan Street (1848)
- Dennis O'Connell House, 416 East Bryan Street (1888)
- Mary Driscoll House, 418 East Bryan Street (1898)
- 17 Price Street (1857)

Northeastern civic/trust block

- Spencer–Woodbridge House, 22 Habersham Street (1790–1804) – oldest building on the square; also known as the George Basil Spencer House
- Margaret Pendergast House, 420 East St. Julian Street (1868)
- Henry Willink Cottage, 426 East St. Julian Street (1845) – replaced a structure torn down by Anne and Mills Lane

Southeastern civic/trust block

- John David Mongin House, 24 Habersham Street (1797) – moved from 25 Habersham Street, across the square
- 419 East St. Julian Street (1826)
- 421–425 East St. Julian Street (1892)

Southeastern residential/tything block

- Harry Schroder Duplex, 32–34 Habersham Street (1898)
- John Ballon Property, 417 East Congress Street (1839)
- John Ballon Property, 419 East Congress Street (1839)
- 425 East Congress Street (1799–1808)

== Gallery ==
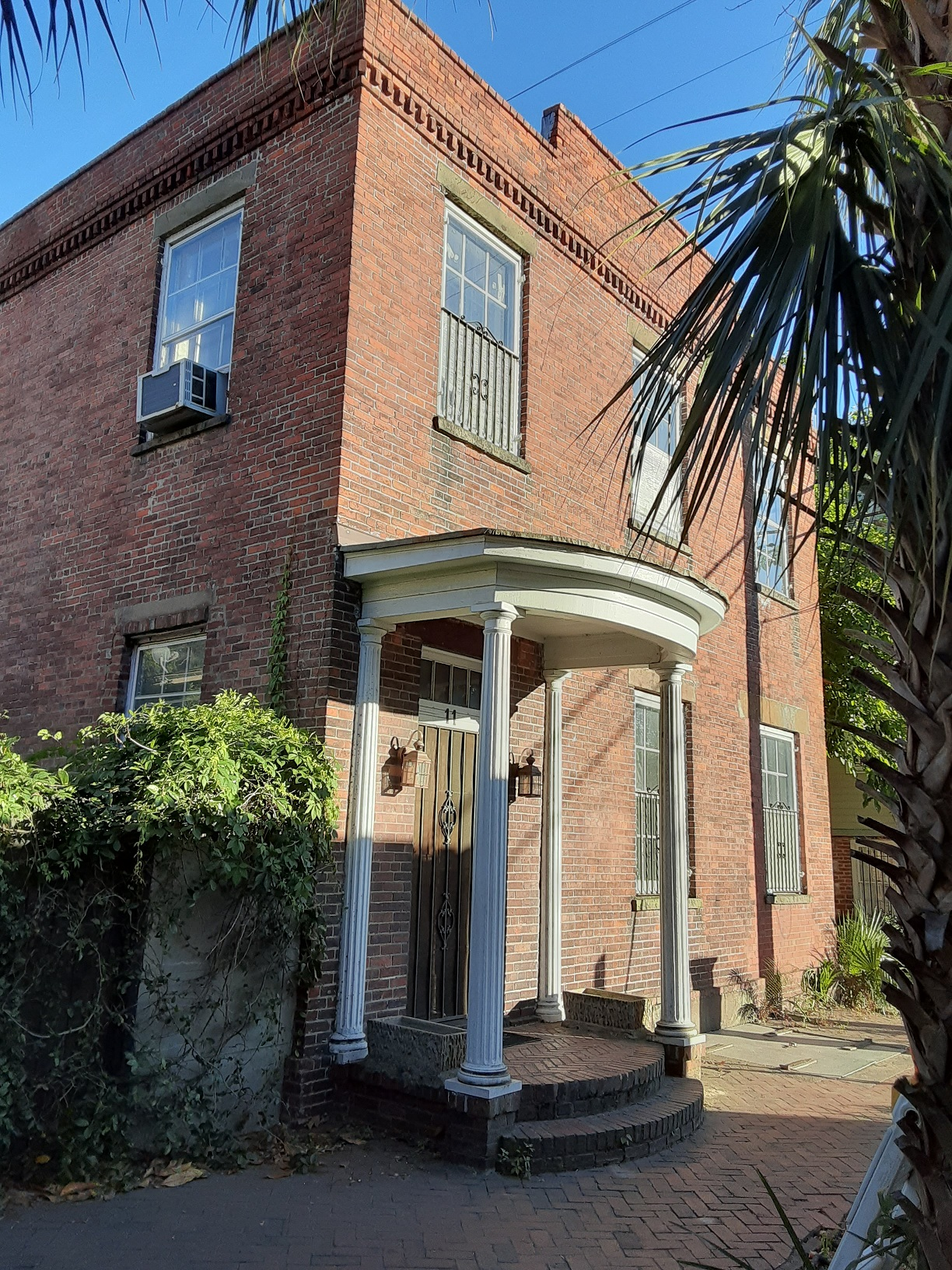
John Strous House, 11 Habersham Street

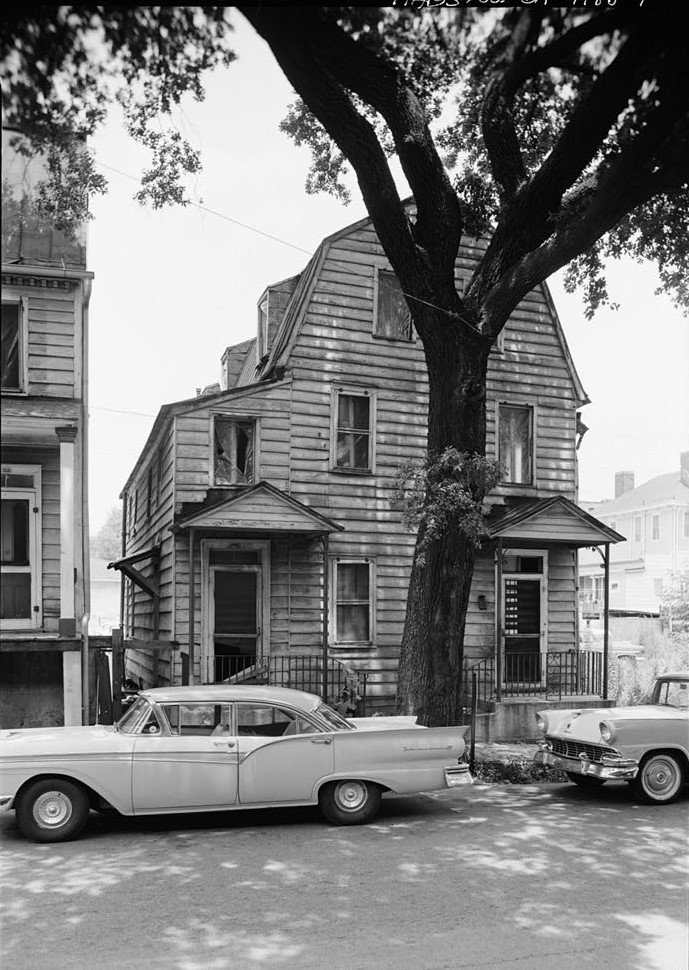
The Hampton Lillibridge House stood at 312 East Bryan Street, but has since been demolished

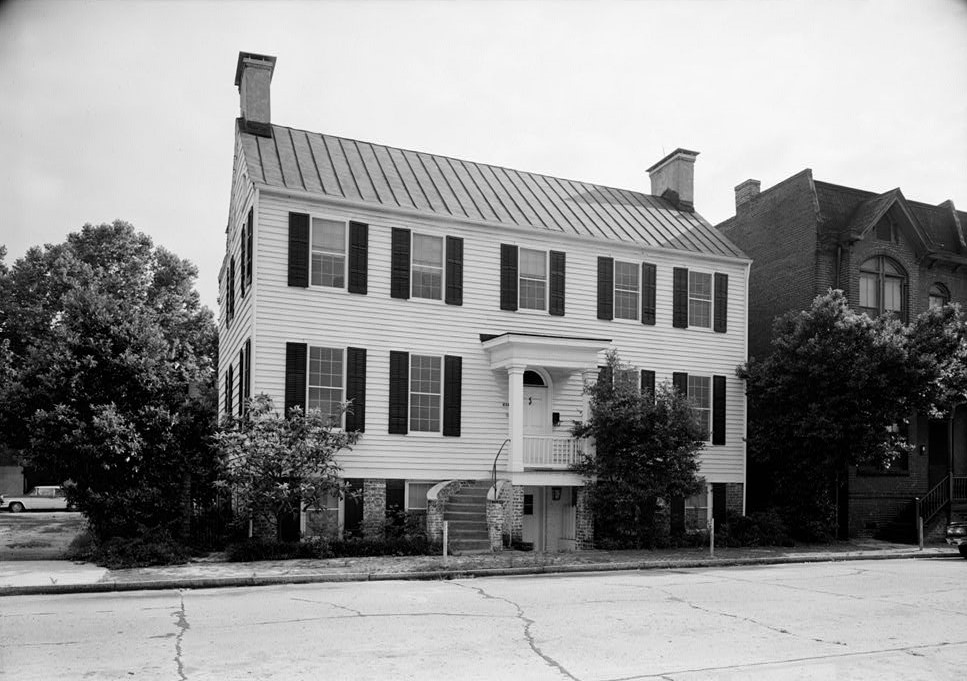
The (estate of) John Eppinger Property was moved to 404 East Bryan Street from 211 West Perry Street

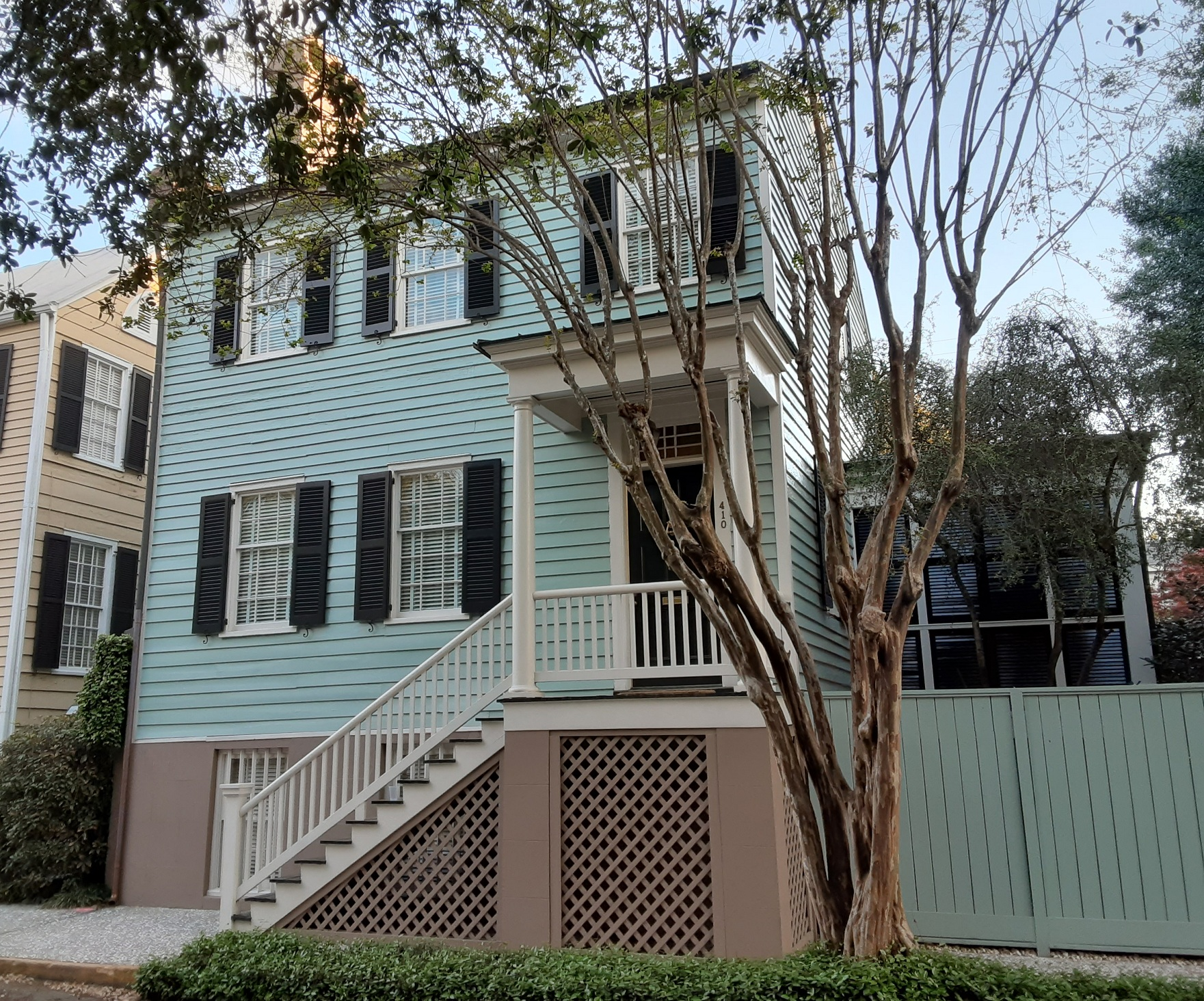
Patrick Shiels House, 410 East Bryan Street

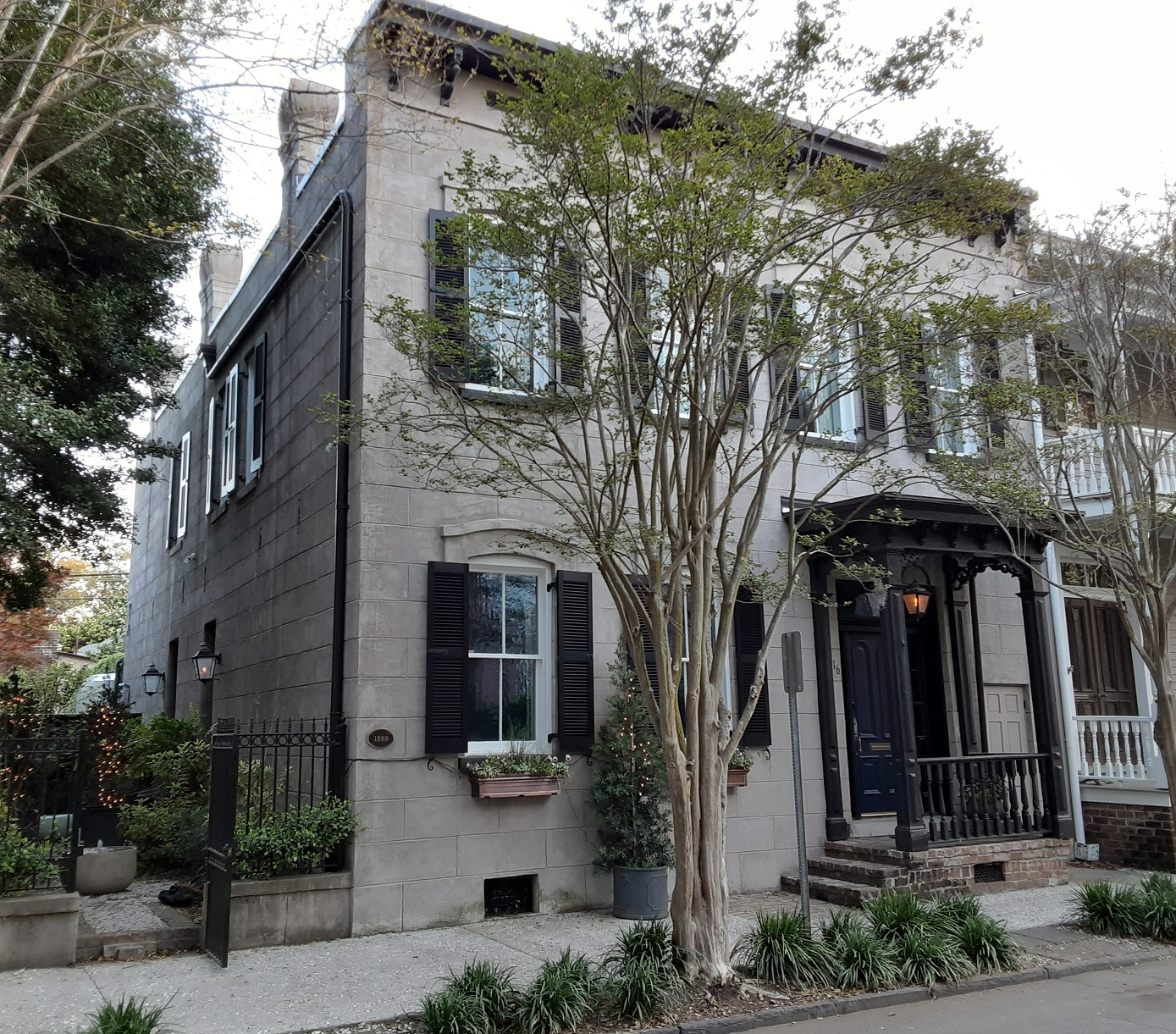
Dennis O'Connell House, 416 East Bryan Street

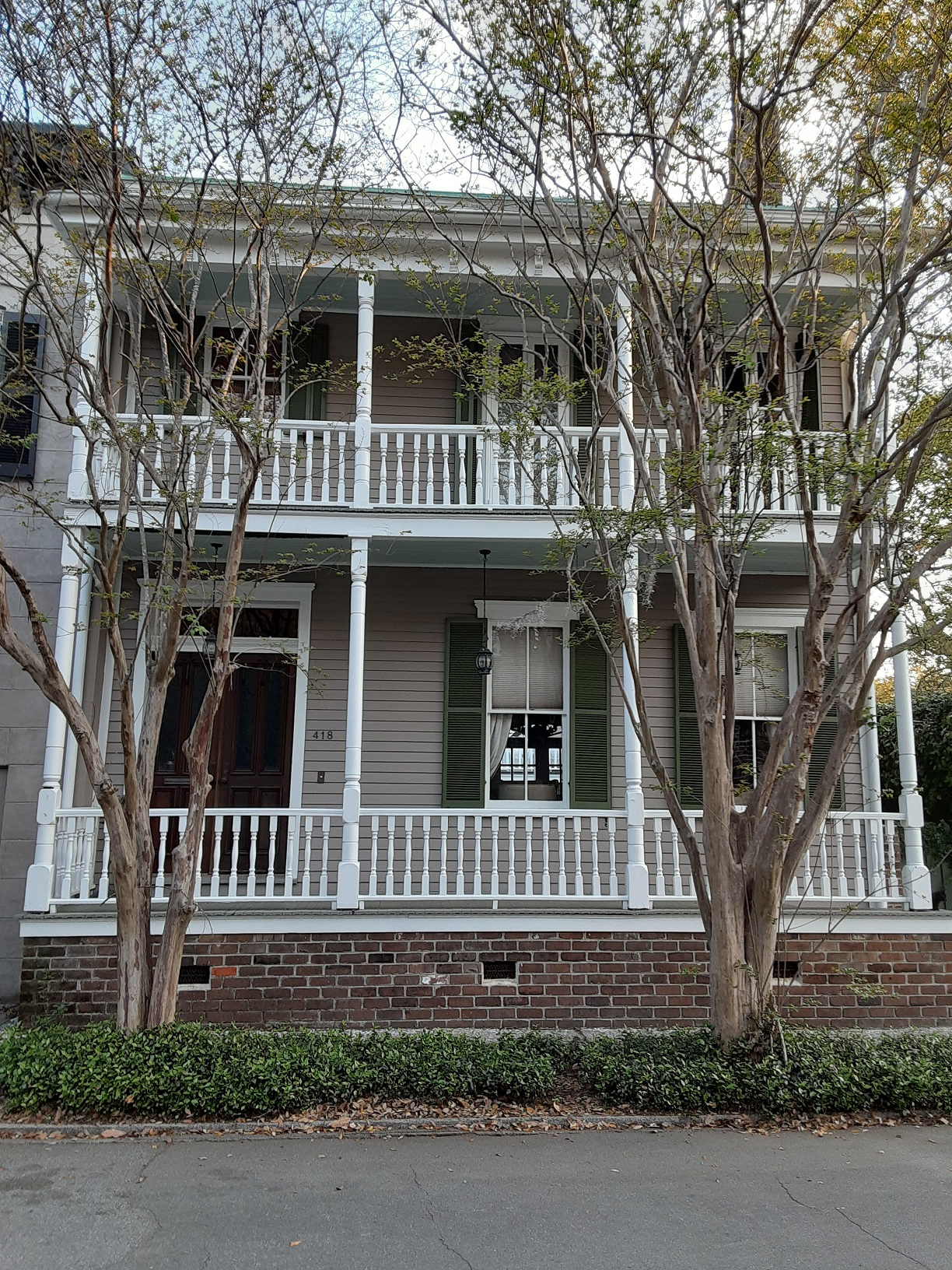
Mary Driscoll House, 418 East Bryan Street

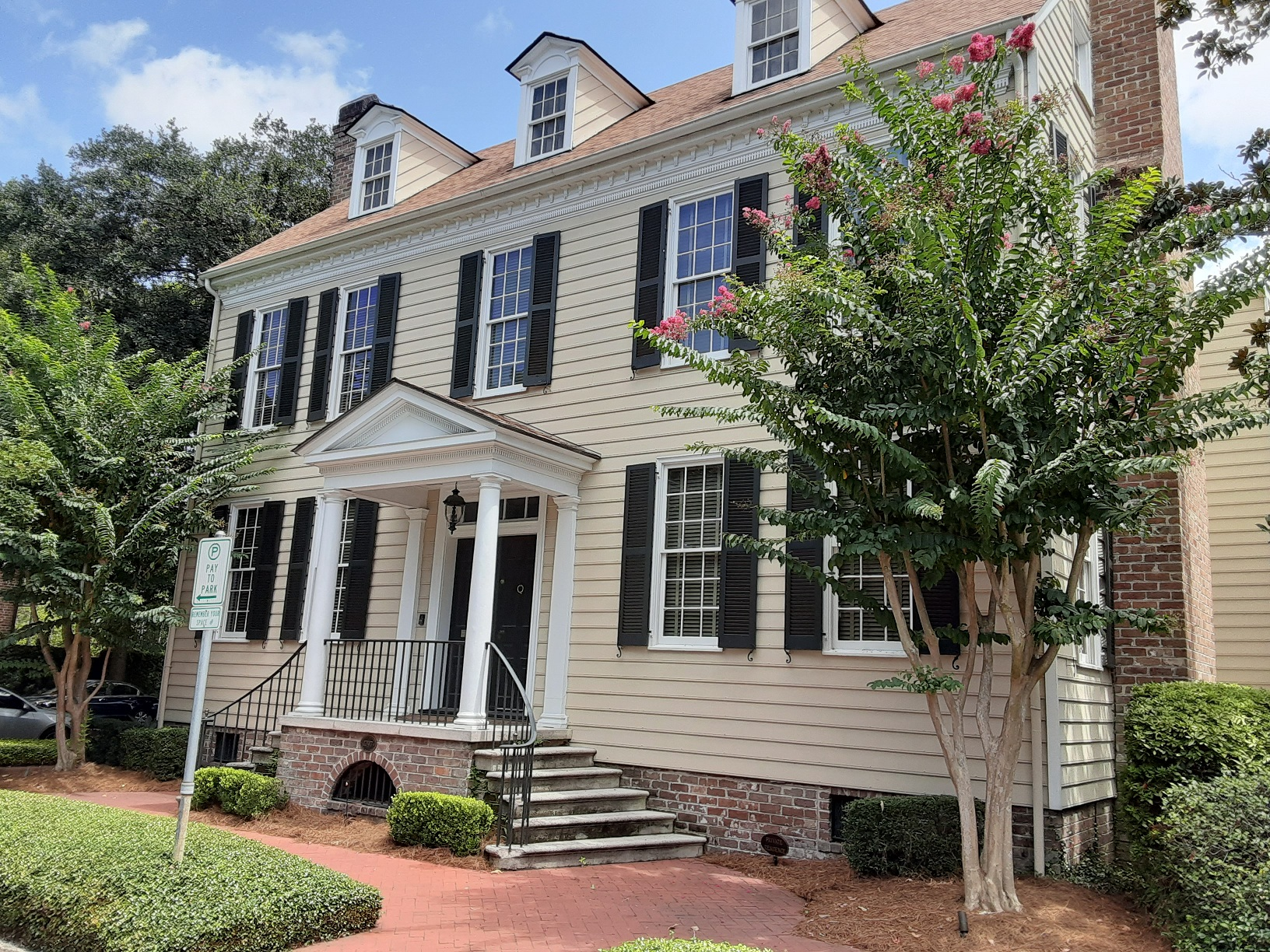
John David Mongin House, 24 Habersham Street

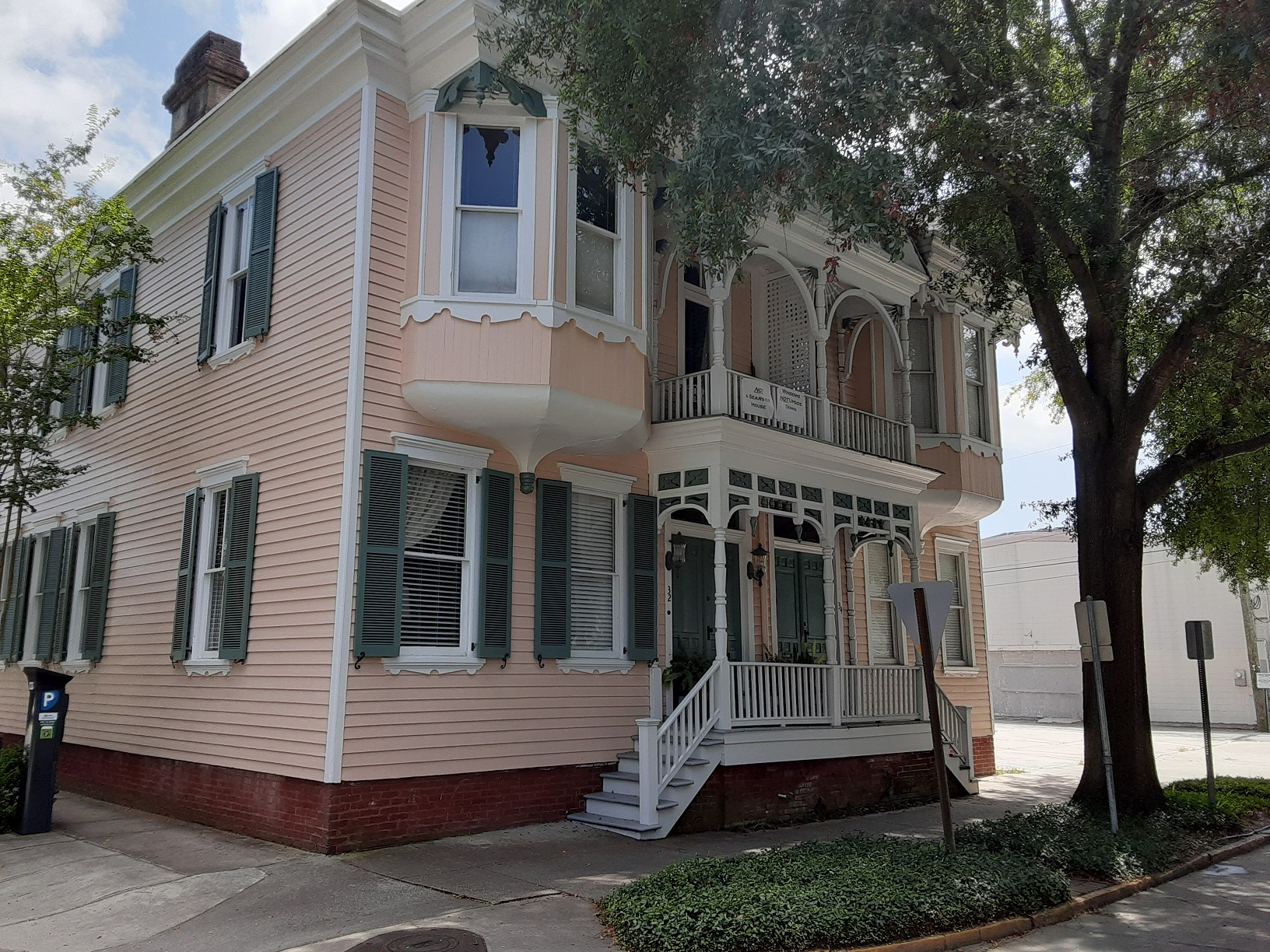
Harry Schroder Duplex, 32−34 Habersham Street

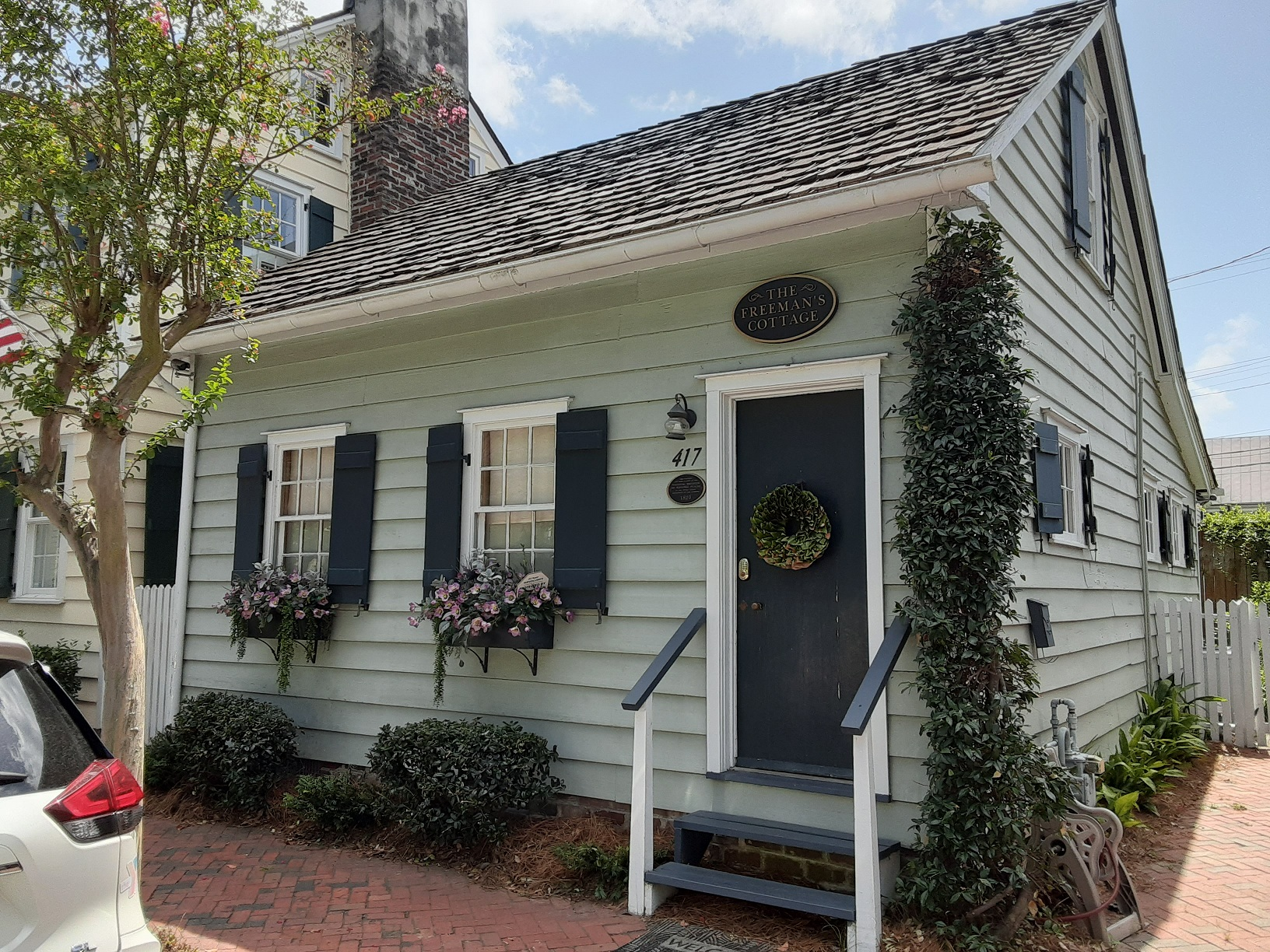
417 East Congress Street, one of the John Ballon properties

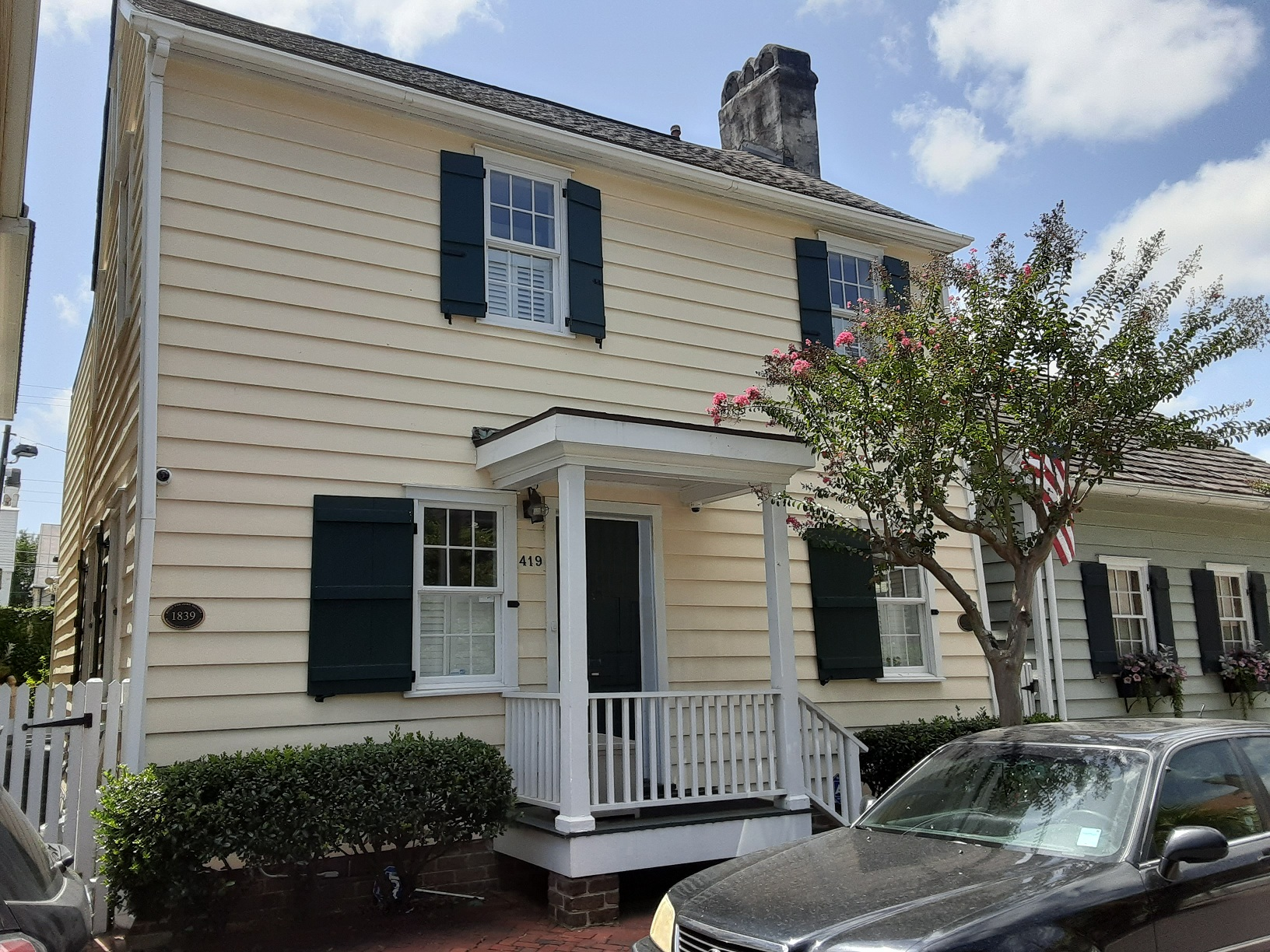
419 East Congress Street, the other John Ballon property

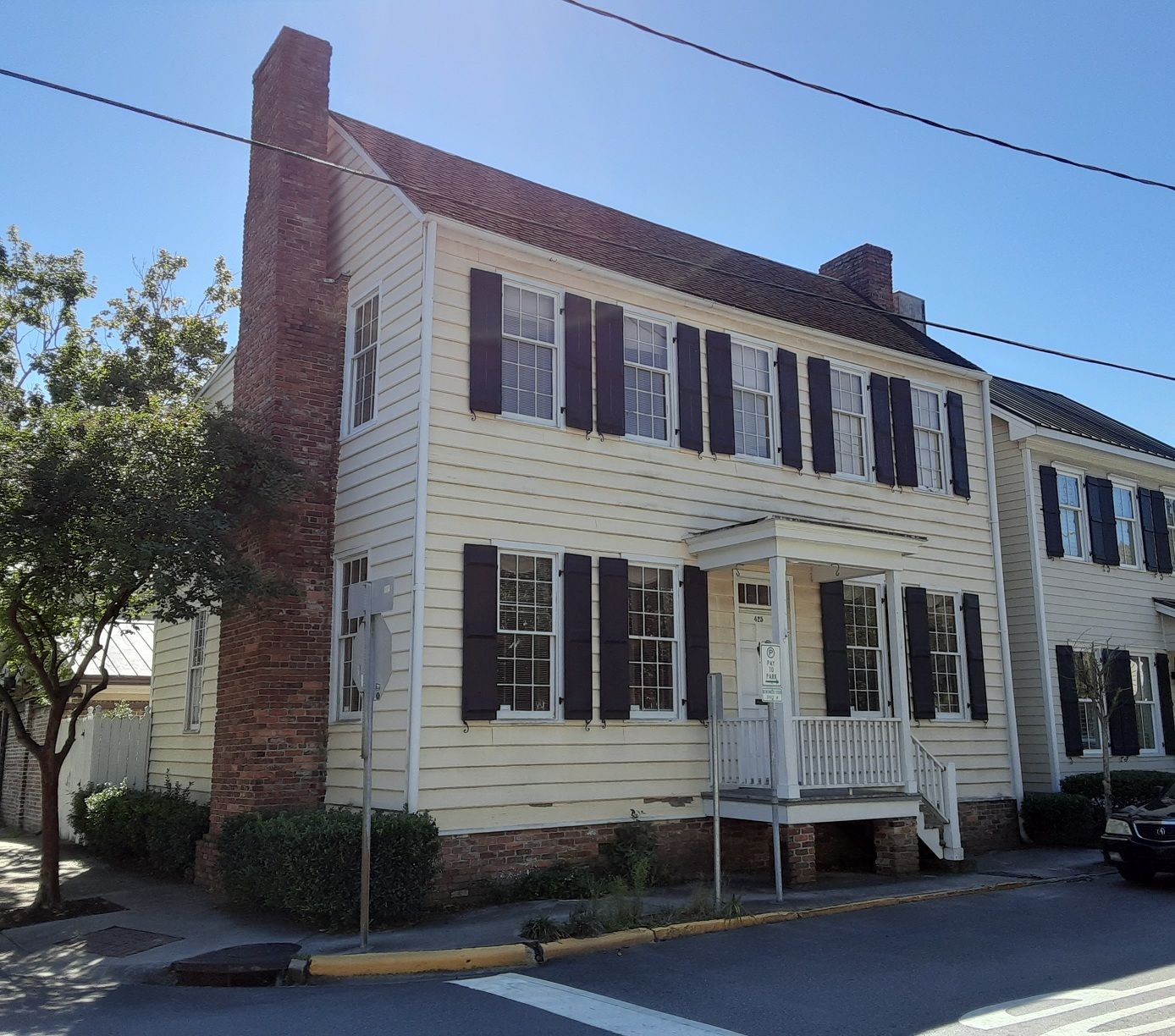
425 East Congress Street

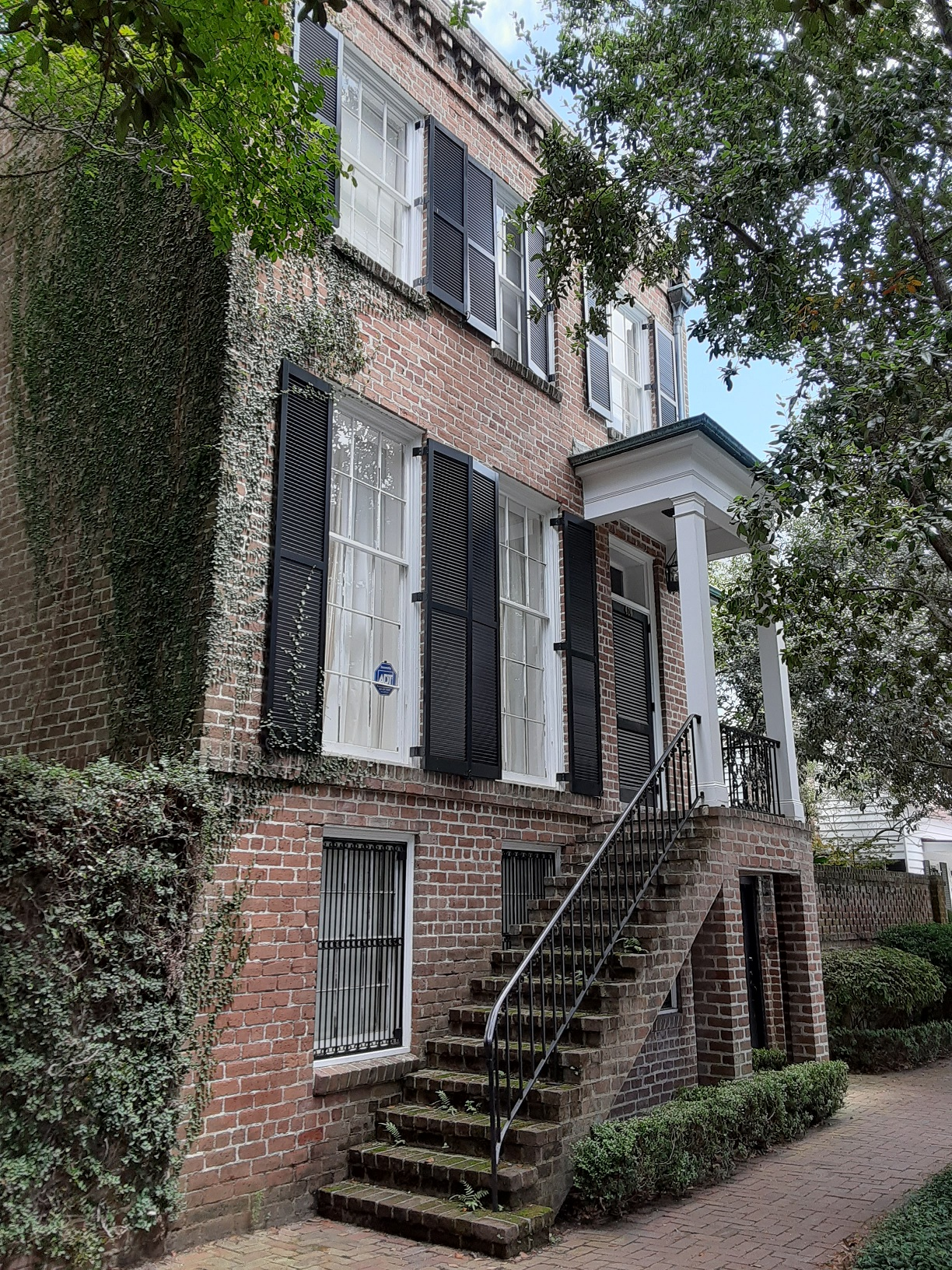
Margaret Pendergast House, 420 East St. Julian Street

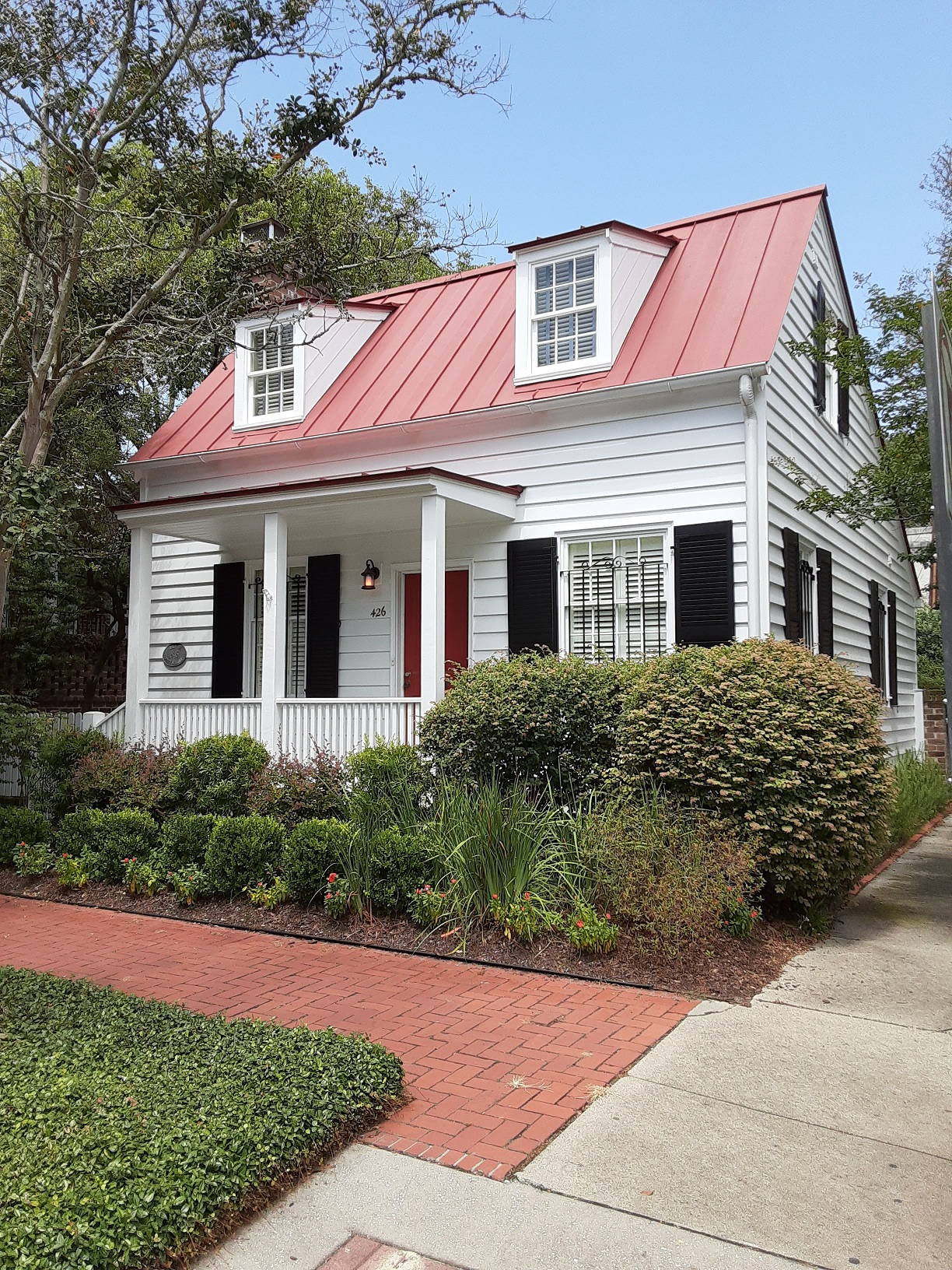
Henry Willink Cottage, 420 East St. Julian Street
