= Massie School =

Massie School and Heritage Education Center

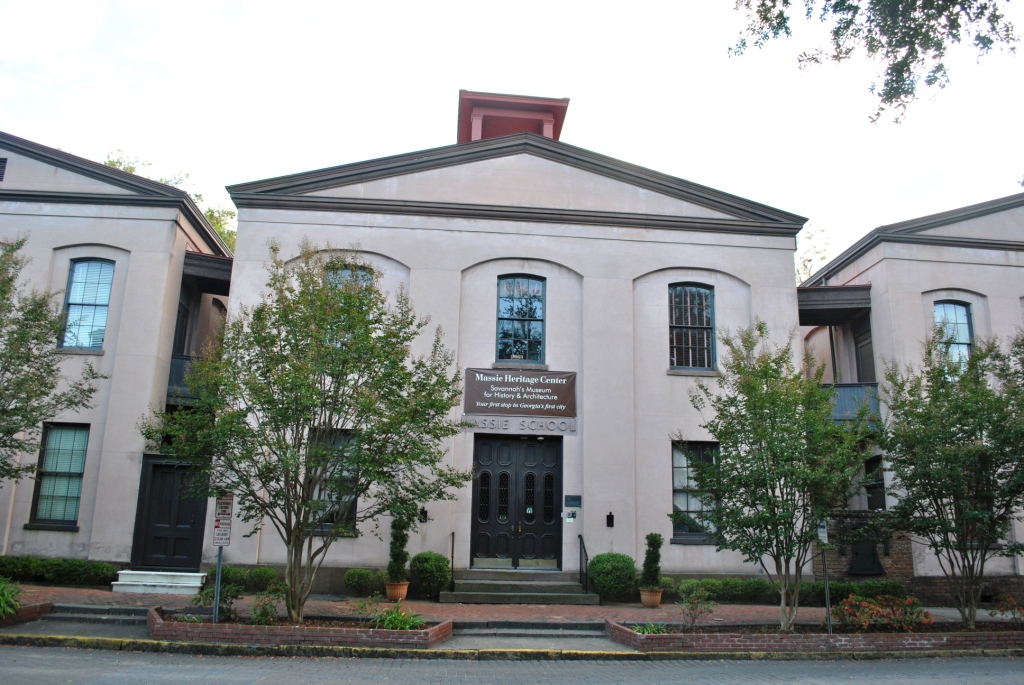
- The school in 2017

Location
- 201–213 East Gordon Street; Savannah, Georgia, Chatham County; United States
- Coordinates: 32°04′13″N 81°05′33″W

Information
- Established: 1856
- Closed: 1974

The Massie School, also referred to as the Massie Common School, opened in 1856 as the first public school in Savannah, Georgia, in the first chartered public school system of the American South. Located on Savannah's Taylor Square at 201–213 East Gordon Street, the original schoolhouse began construction in 1855 with invested funds from Peter Massie, an immigrant from Scotland. Massie intended his investment to be used for the creation of a free school for Savannah's poor children. The Massie School remained in use as a public elementary school until its closing in 1974; two notable exceptions include its utilization by Union troops as a hospital during the American Civil War and then briefly as a Freedmen's school. Today, the Massie Heritage Center occupies the original schoolhouse and serves as a museum. However, the building remains the longest continuously operating public schoolhouse in the state of Georgia.

== Construction ==
In 1841, Peter Massie (1765–1840), a Scottish planter who resided in Glynn County, Georgia, bequeathed $5,000 to the City of Savannah, with the request that the money be invested until the return had accrued an amount required to fund the construction of a school for the underserved children of the city. The money was invested in railroad and gas company stocks of the Central Rail Road and Canal Company and the Savannah Gas Light Company until 1855, when the city hired the successful New York architect John S. Norris to design and oversee the construction process of the school.

Norris built the central schoolhouse with Savannah gray brick in the Greek Revival style he had previously used for the U.S. Custom House, which originally brought him to the city in 1846. In 1856, construction of the central schoolhouse building was completed and welcomed 150 students and three teachers in the first semester. Enrollment grew to 240 students by the end of the first school year. The school was progressively co-ed, but students were separated by gender in the classroom and by independent outdoor spaces, each with their own outhouse.

In 1872, architect John Hogg designed the plans for the east annex and later, in 1886, the west wing was added. Both of the facades of the flanking buildings replicate Norris' original design.

== Civil War ==
When General Sherman and his army of 60,000 Union soldiers captured Savannah in December 1864, the school was temporarily closed to students and converted into a hospital for his troops. The school made for an ideal hospital location due to its size and the powerful coal burning furnace in the building's basement which brought heat throughout the building. The tactical Union Naval blockade of the Savannah River prevented vital supplies from making its way to Confederate troops in Savannah, including coal. This resulted in the occupying troops burning other readily available materials for heat, like school furniture, irreparably breaking the furnace.

== Freedmen School ==
In May 1865, the school briefly operated as a Freedmen school. These efforts were led by Reverend S. W. Magill, using teachers from the American Missionary Association. The school hosted recently emancipated slaves until mass enrollment necessitated expanding the program and relocating to several churches and other locations formerly operated by the Savannah Education Association. The Massie School was re-designated as a white school in October of the same year, maintaining that status until public school integration in the 1960s.

== Closing ==
Savannah's population was expanding and with the increase of available public schools, the Massie School officially closed at the end of the 1974 school year, citing the continued expenses being unsustainable against decreasing enrollment numbers. In 1975, Emma Adler, a Savannah native and wife of fellow preservationist Lee Adler, collaborated with former Savannah School Board president Saxon Pope Bargeron to develop a plan for the obsolete school house. Adler and Bargeron created the Friends of Massie Committee to restore and maintain the integrity of the grounds and buildings, and to create a heritage education program. The research performed by Adler and Bargeron revealed the rich history of the site, and in November 1976, Bargeron nominated the Massie Common School building to be listed with the National Register of Historic Places, which it officially received in April 1977.

== Massie Heritage Center ==
The Massie Heritage Center opened in 1978, bringing forward the education program developed by the Friends of Massie Committee and the Board of Education for the Savannah-Chatham County Public School System. The program includes the re-creation of a 19th-century schoolroom and interactive exhibits to educate visitors on local history through the lenses of the public education system, coastal Georgia culture, the civil rights movement, and the iconic architectural styles of the city. The Massie Heritage Center is still managed and maintained by Savannah-Chatham Public Schools and is open to the public. It serves over 10,000 student visitors per year.
