= John S. Norris =

American architect

- Born: 1804; New York City, New York, U.S.
- Died: July 25, 1876 (aged 72); Blauvelt, New York, U.S.
- Occupation: Architect

John S. Norris (1804 – July 25, 1876) was an American architect.

He was born and raised in New York City, where he began his career as a mason. He advanced to being a builder and eventually listed himself in the telephone directory as an architect.

In 1839, he went to Wilmington, North Carolina, where he first supervised construction, and then received his first independent commission to design the Wilmington Custom House in 1843. While working on that commission, he was asked to design the Savannah Custom House in Savannah, Georgia, which was built from 1848 to 1852. This led to numerous commissions in Savannah, including the Andrew Low House, the Mercer House, Massie Common School House and the Green-Meldrim House. Norris also designed the Unitarian Church, which was originally built in 1853 on Oglethorpe Square; this church was designed for free people of color. The church has since been moved to Troup Square, where it is now the Unitarian Universalist Church of Savannah. Norris also designed lighthouses for the Savannah River and Cockspur Island.

== Personal life ==
In 1853 Norris purchased what is now known as the Blauvelt-Norris-Burr-House in Blauvelt, New York, where he lived until his death in 1876 at the age of 72.

Norris was married to Sarah Ann, who died on May 23, 1865, at the age of 50.

Norris' daughter, Josephine M. Barlow, died on May 15, 1864, of heart disease. She had married Frederick C. Barlow three years earlier.

== Publications ==
- John S. Norris: Architect in Savannah, Mary Lane Morrison (1980) ASIN B0039ZS2OE

== Gallery ==
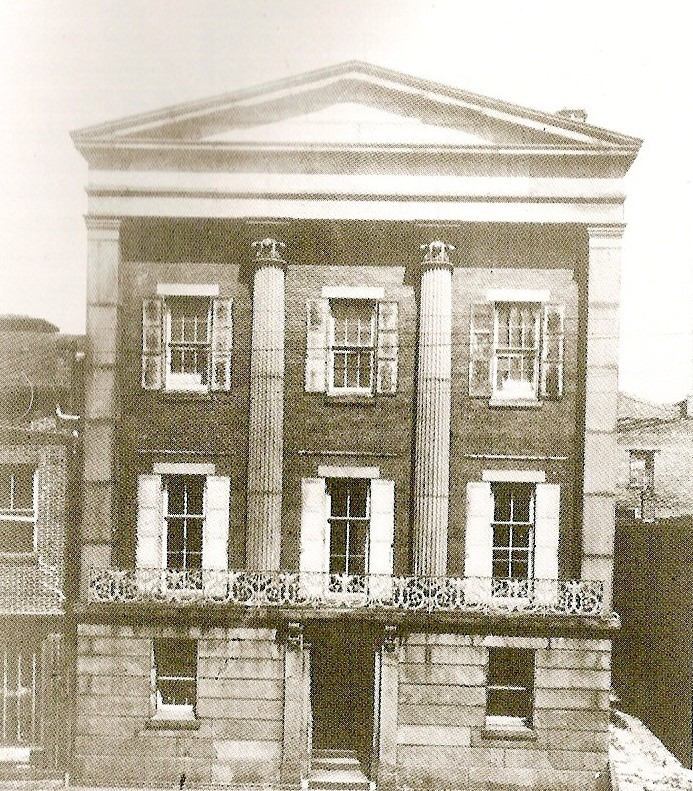
Wilmington Custom House, 1843, Wilmington, North Carolina. Demolished in 1915

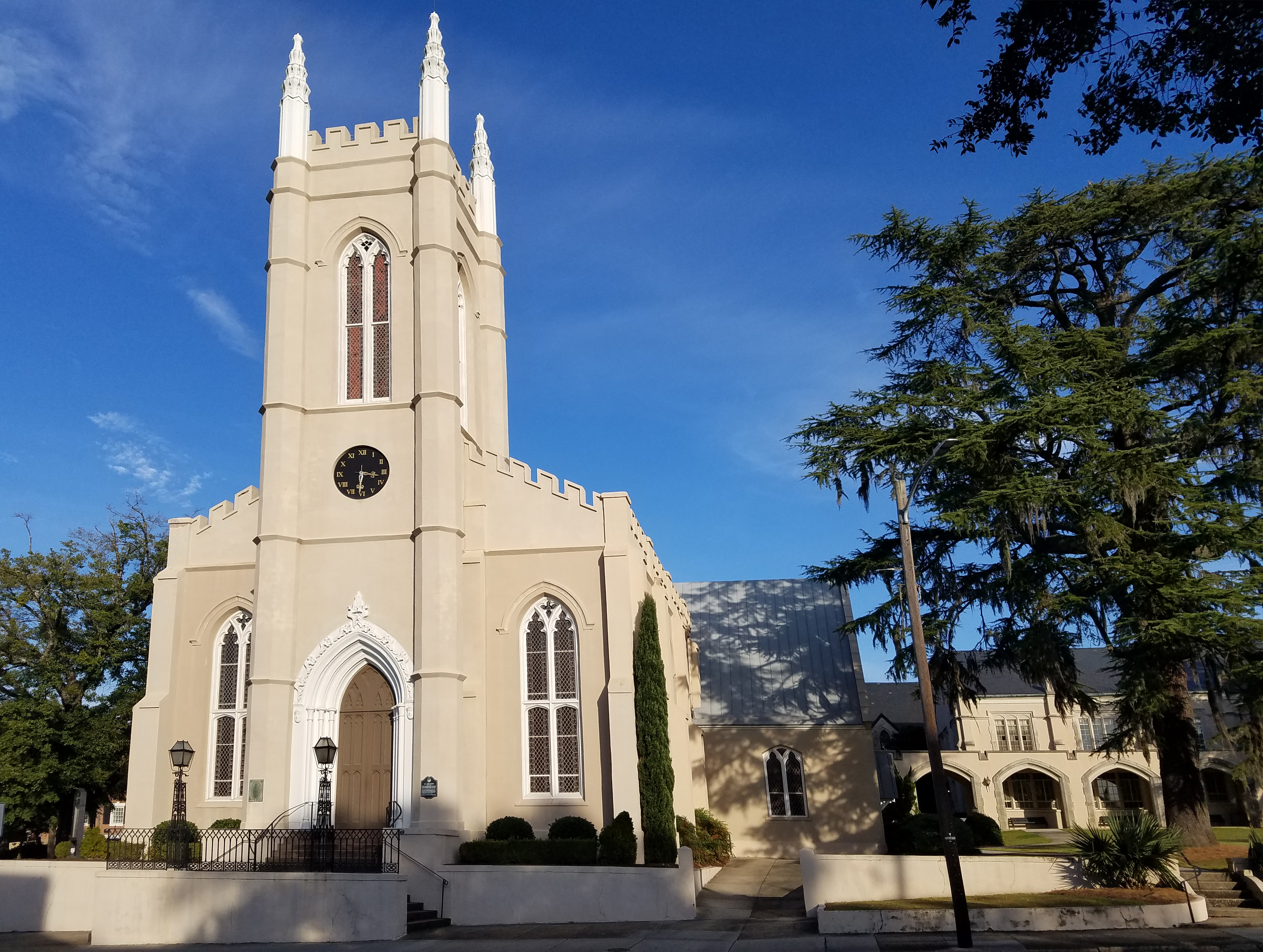
St James Episcopal Church, 1839-1840, Wilmington

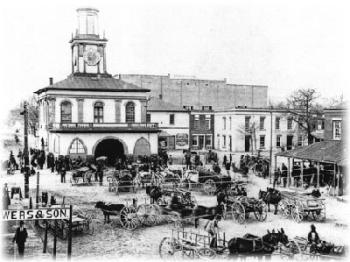
Wilmington Market House, ca. 1840, Wilmington (possible collaboration, main architect Benjamin Gardner)

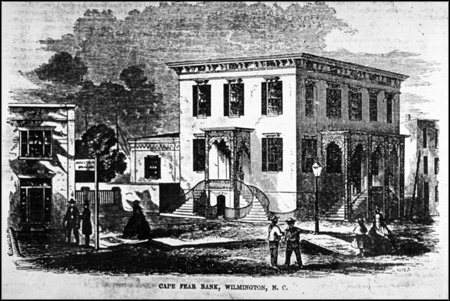
Cape Fear Bank, 1840, Wilmington

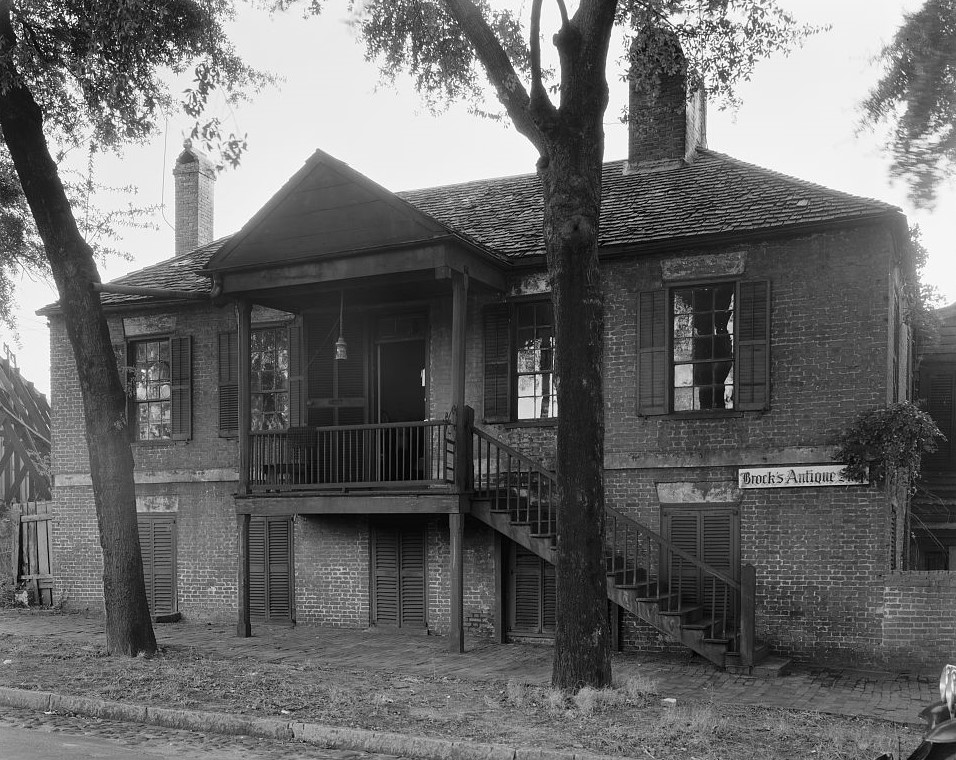
Masonic Hall, 1841, Wilmington (possible attribution, demolished)

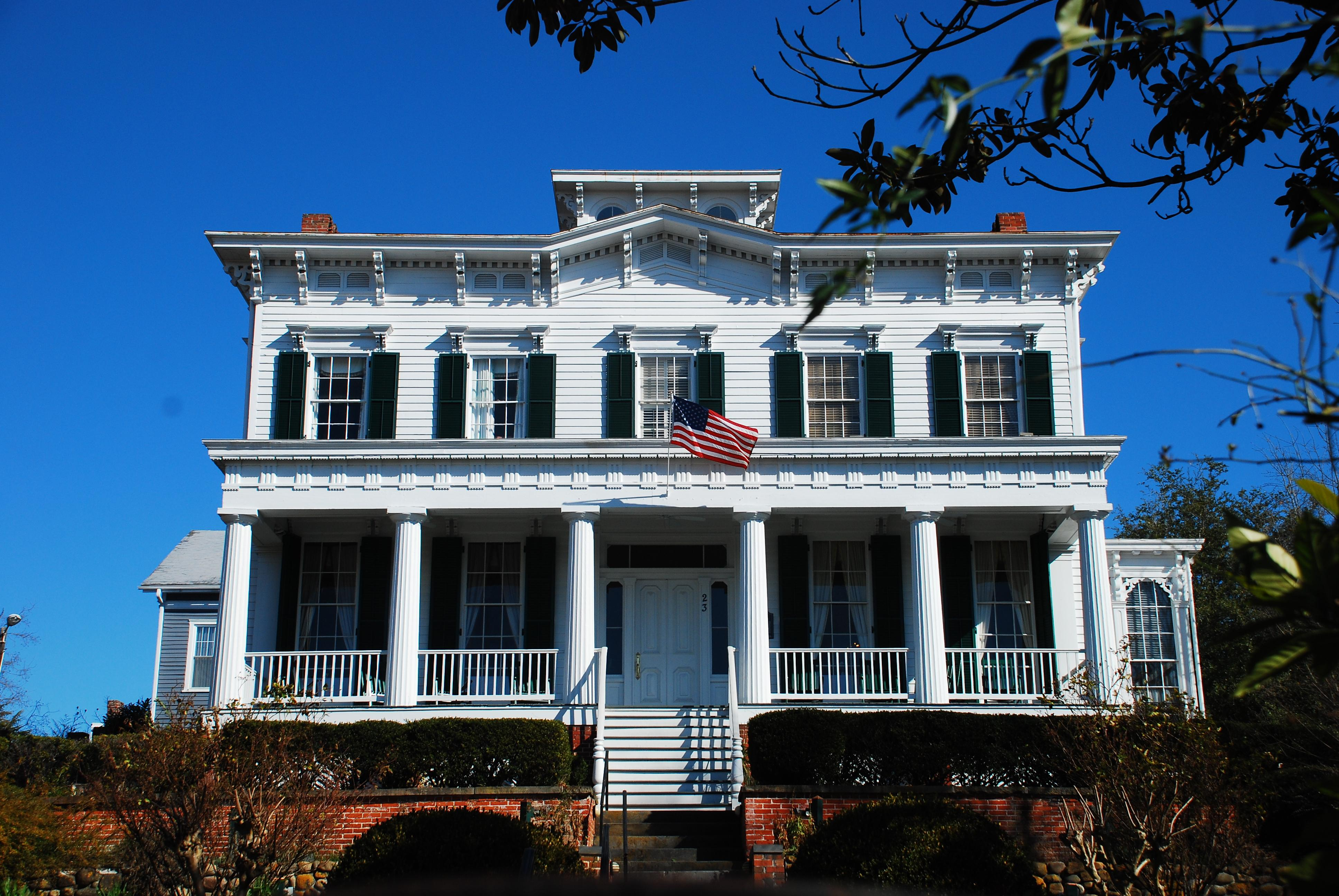
Armand J. DeRosset, Jr., House (now the City Club Inn), ca. 1842, Wilmington (possible collaboration, main architect Christopher Dall)

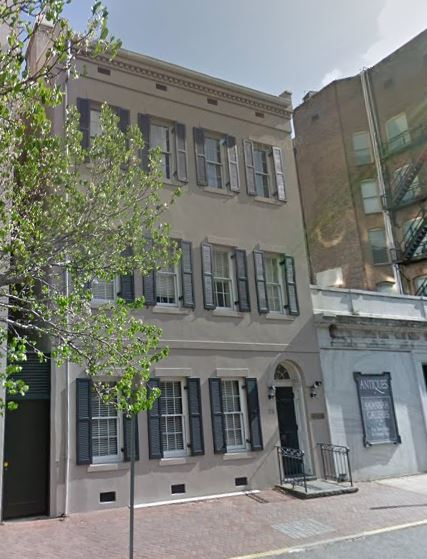
Georgia Historical Society Library, 1846-1849, Savannah

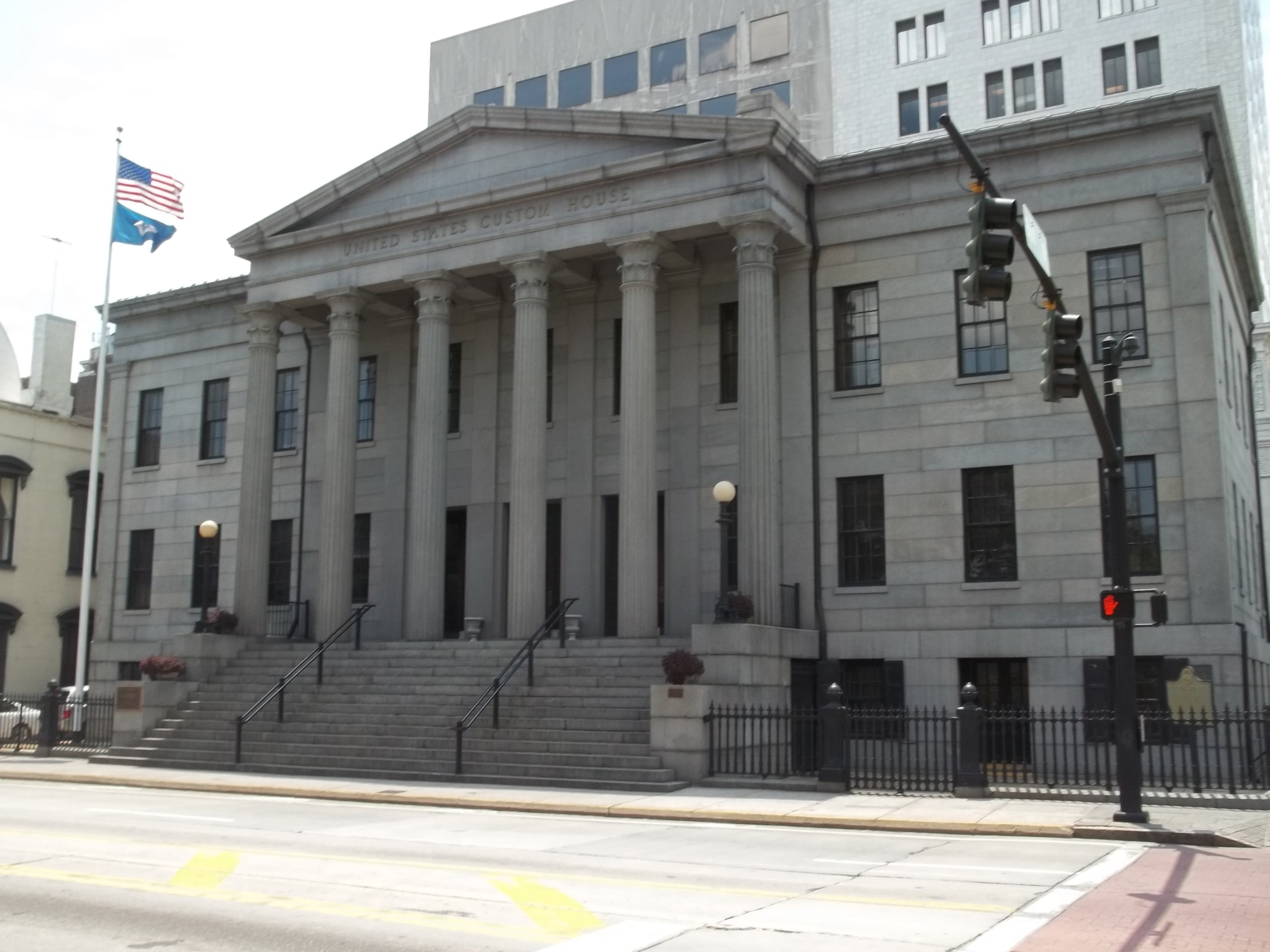
Savannah Customhouse, 1846-1852, Savannah

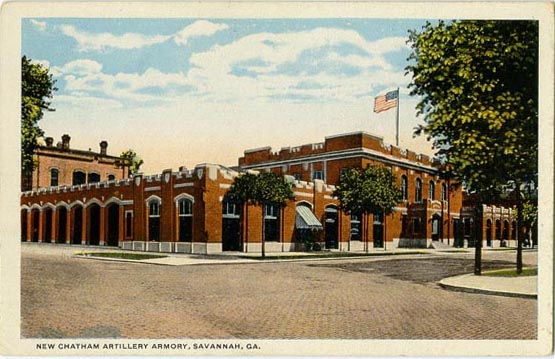
Chatham Artillery Armory, 1847-1849, Savannah (demolished)

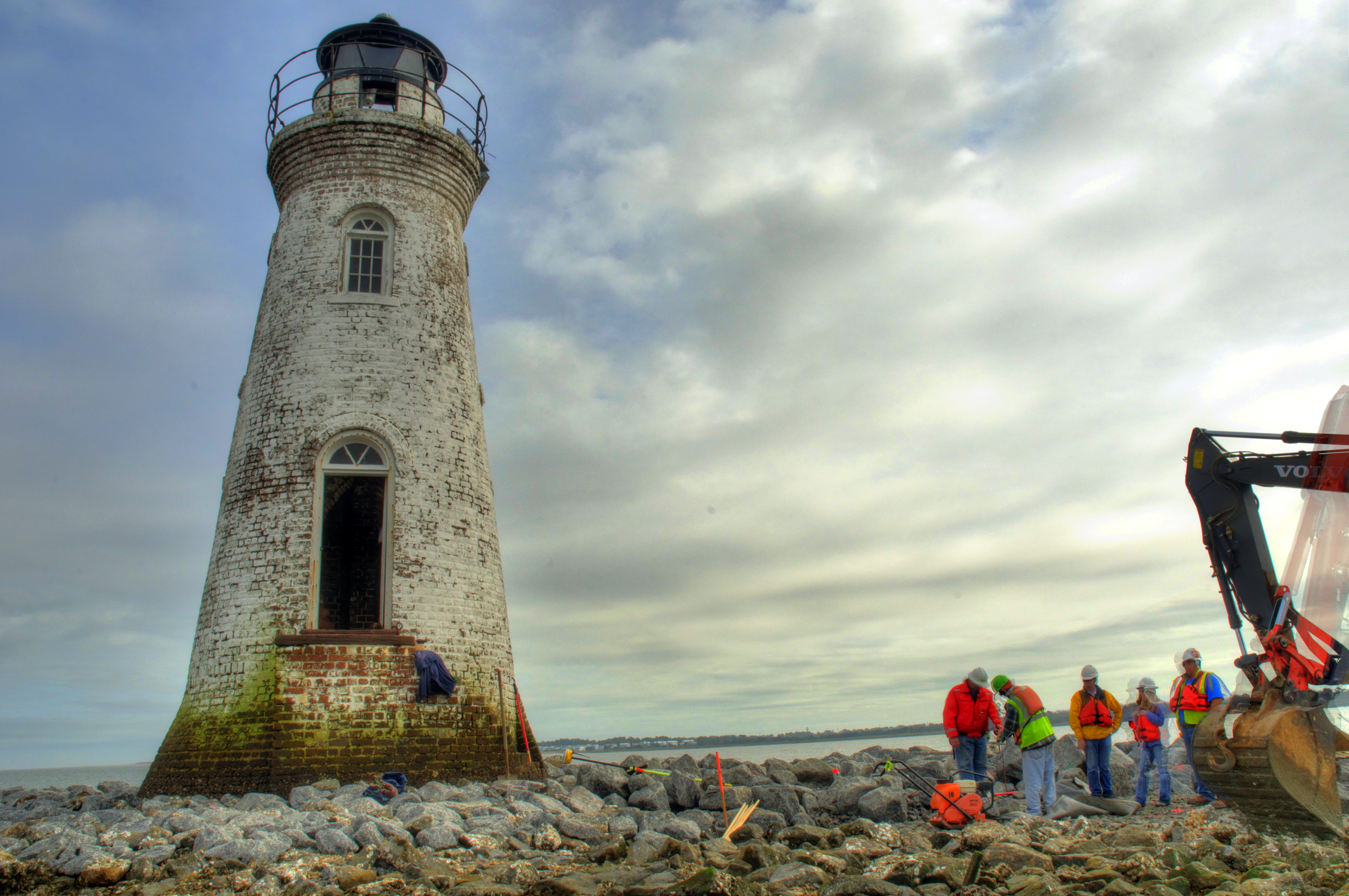
Cockspur Island Lighthouse, 1848-1849, east of Cockspur Island

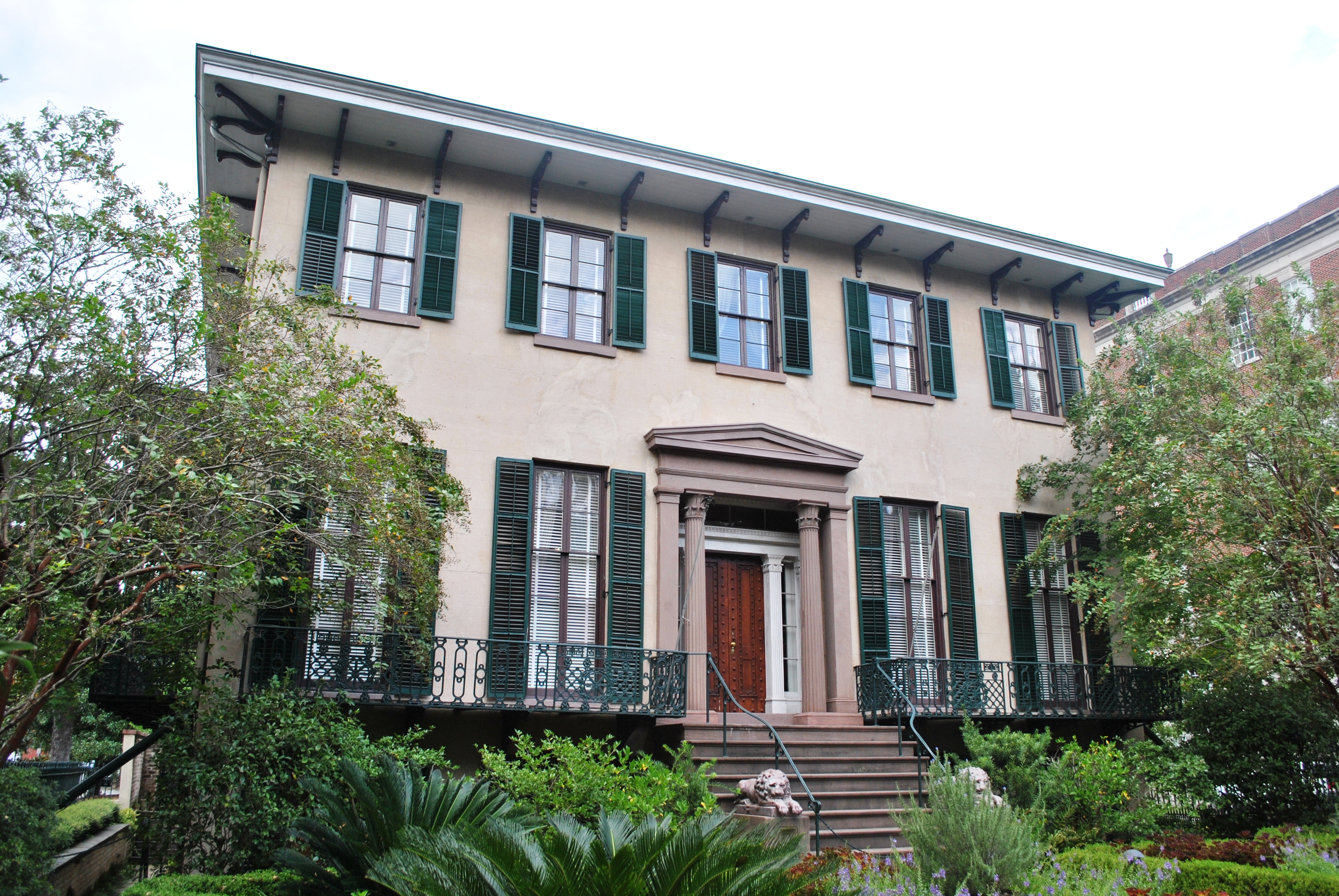
Andrew Low House, 1849, Savannah

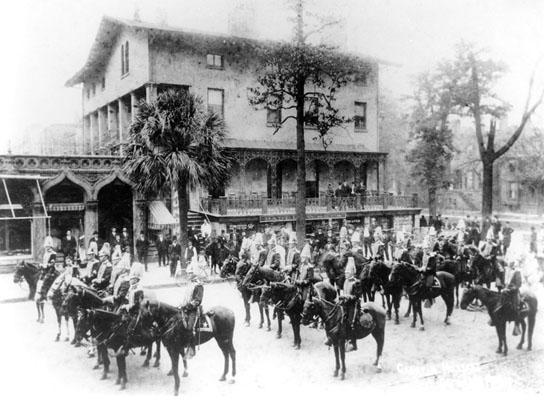
Joseph Fay House (now Knights of Columbus Headquarters), 1849, Savannah

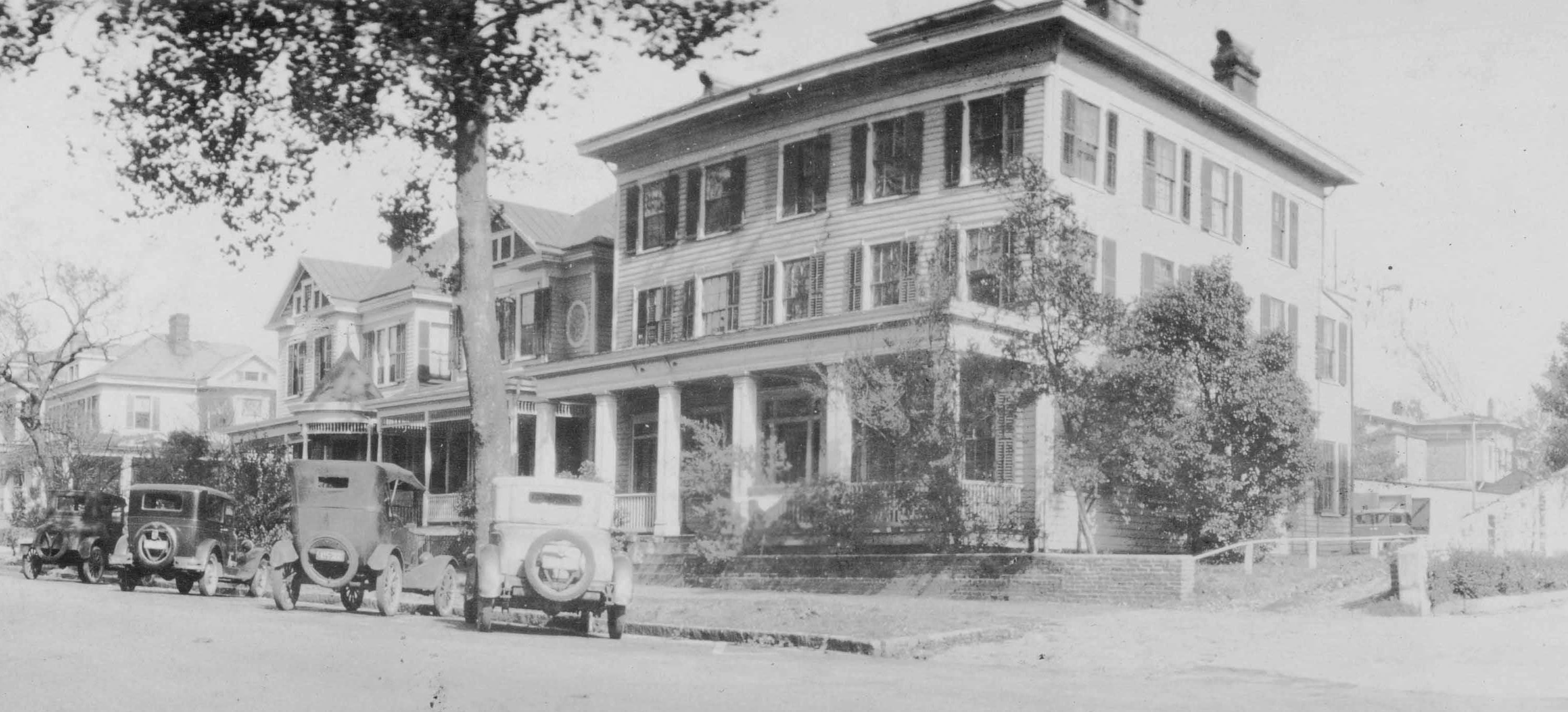
P. R. Dickinson House, ca. 1850, Wilmington (possible attribution, demolished in 1900)

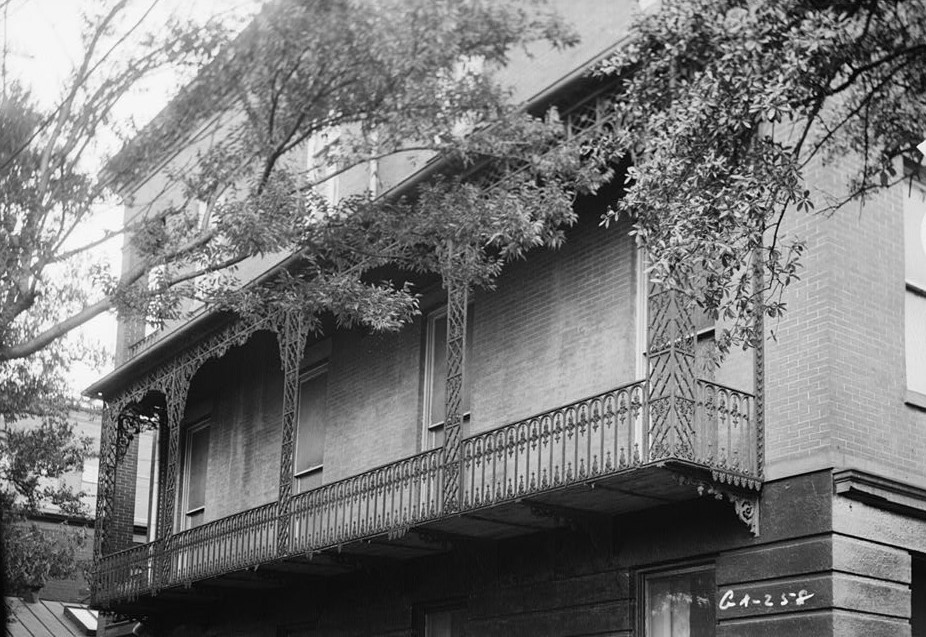
Alexander A. Smets House (now SCAD’s Morris Hall), 1853, Savannah

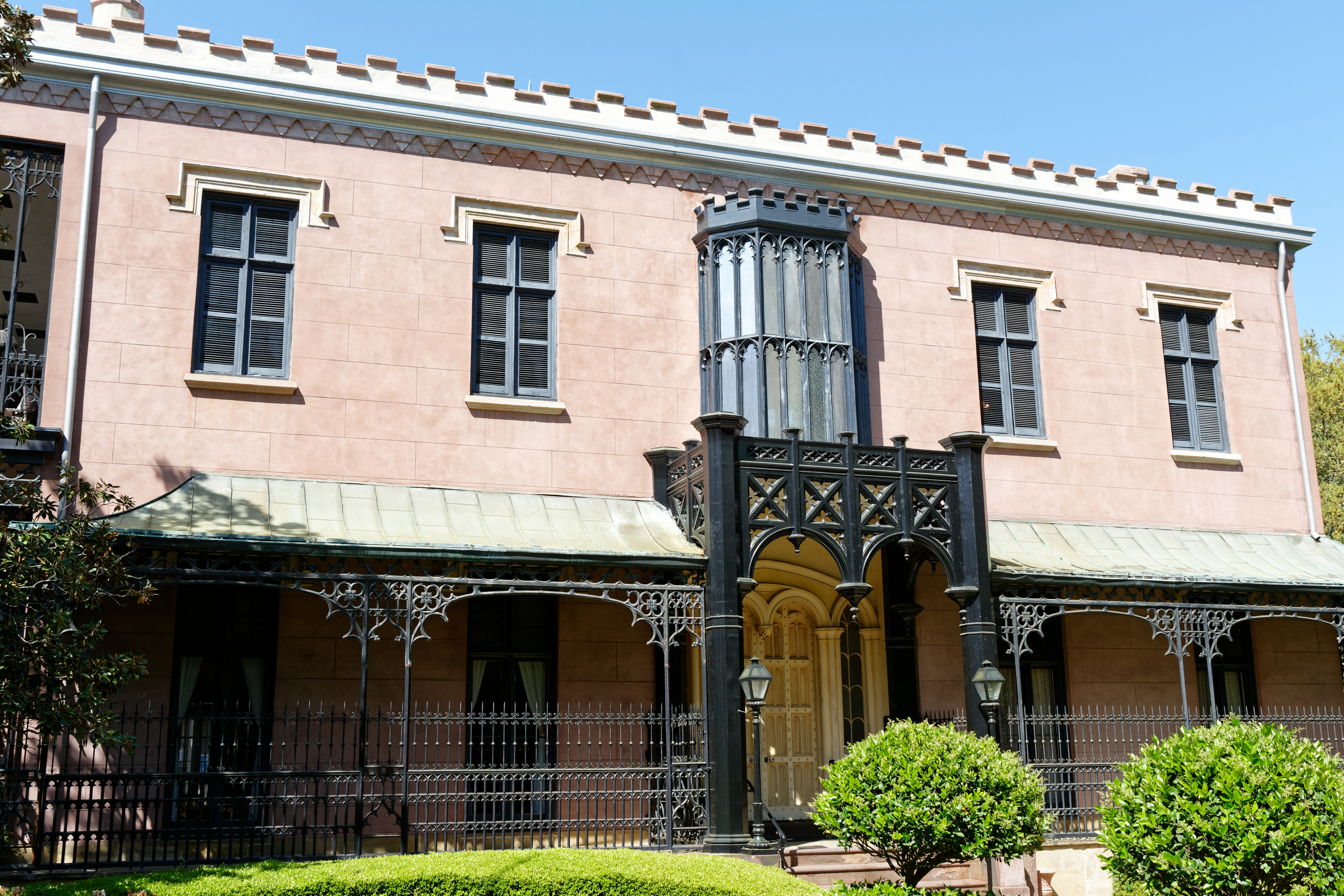
Green-Meldrim House, ca. 1853-1856, Savannah

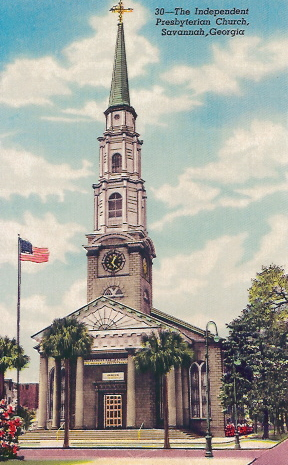
Independent Presbyterian Church, 1855, Savannah

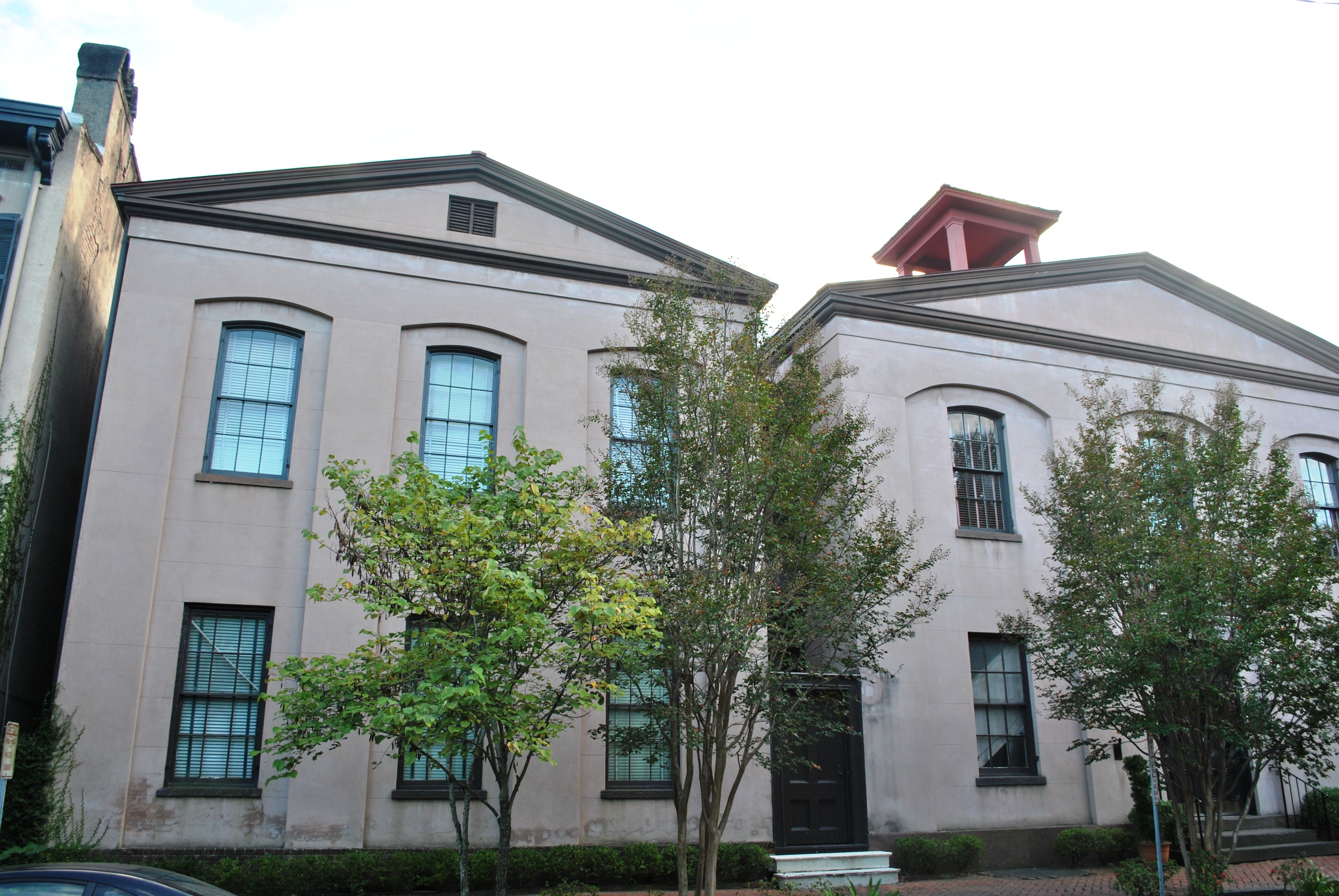
Massie Common School House, 1855-1856, Savannah

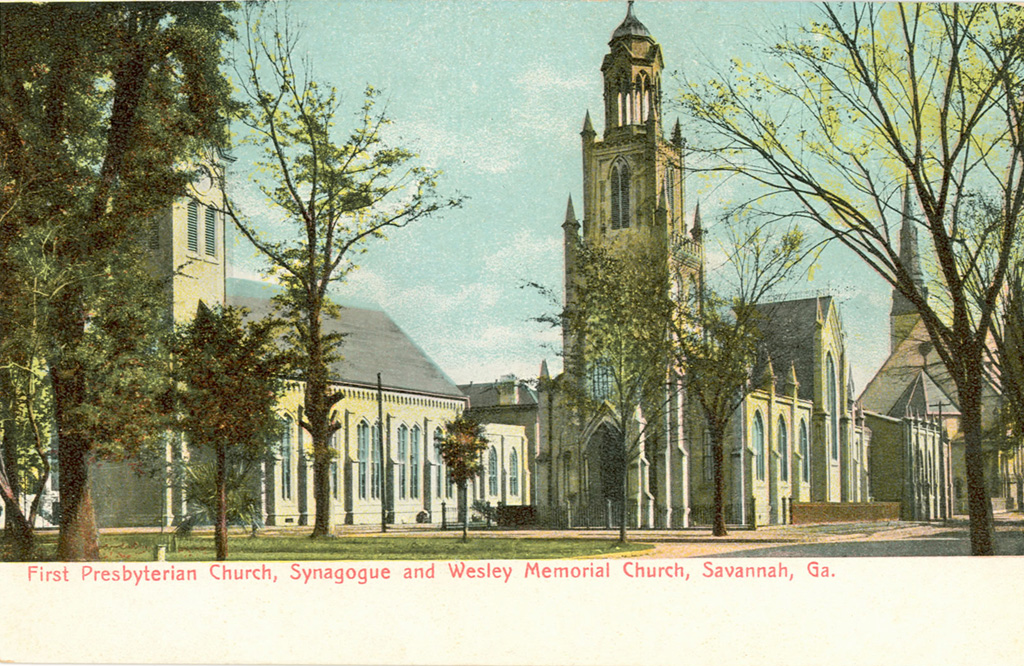
First Presbyterian Church, 1855-1872, Savannah (demolished)

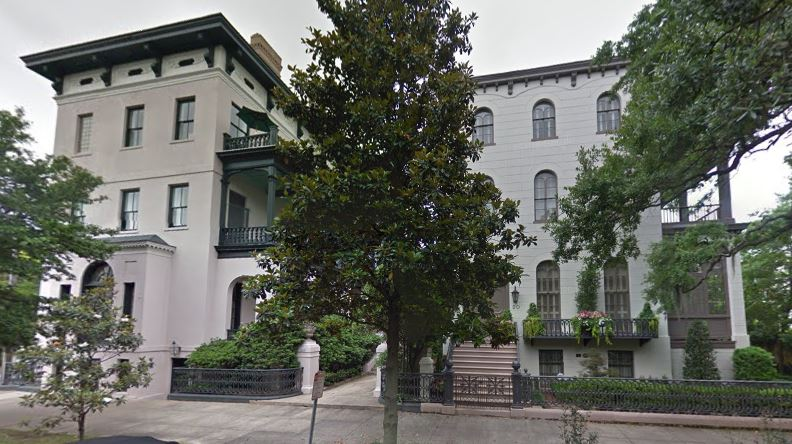
William F. Brantley House, 1857, Savannah

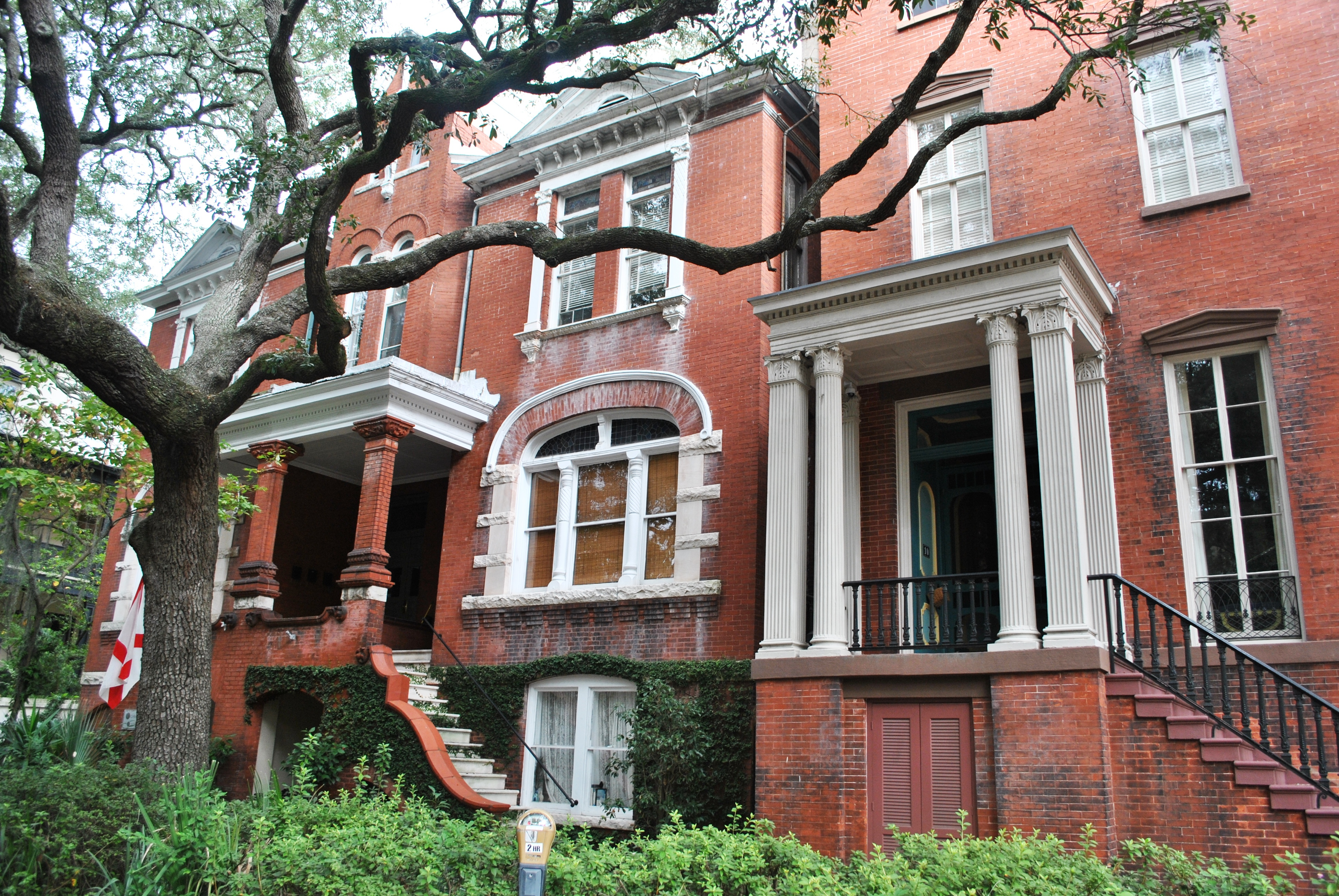
Noah B. Knapp House, 1857, Savannah

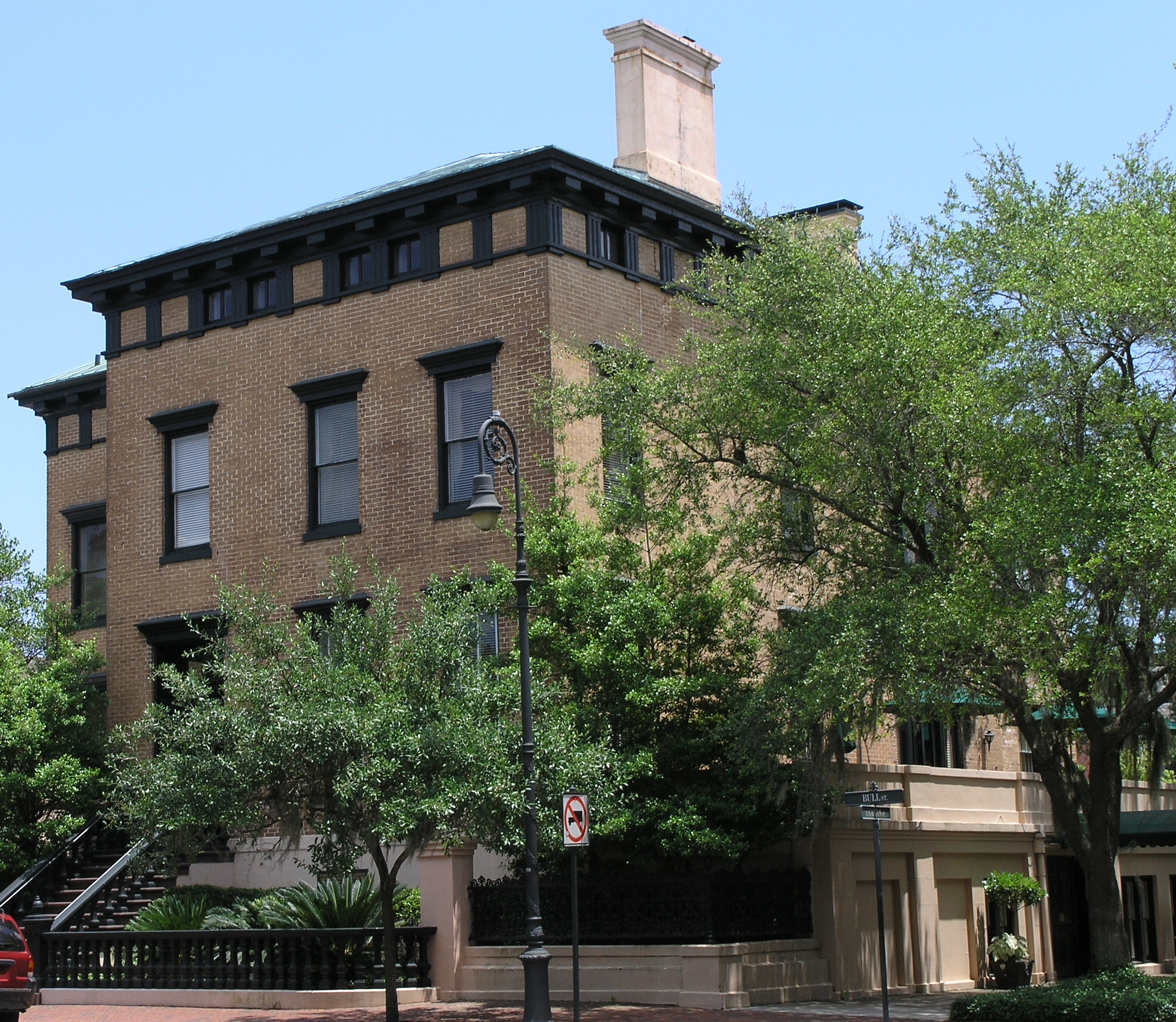
Edmund Molyneux House (now Oglethorpe Club), 1857, Savannah

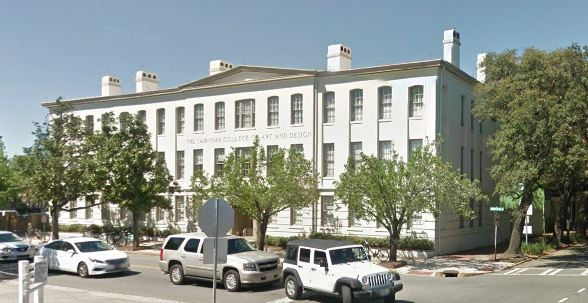
Abrahams Home for Indigent Females (now SCAD’s Norris Hall), 1858, Savannah

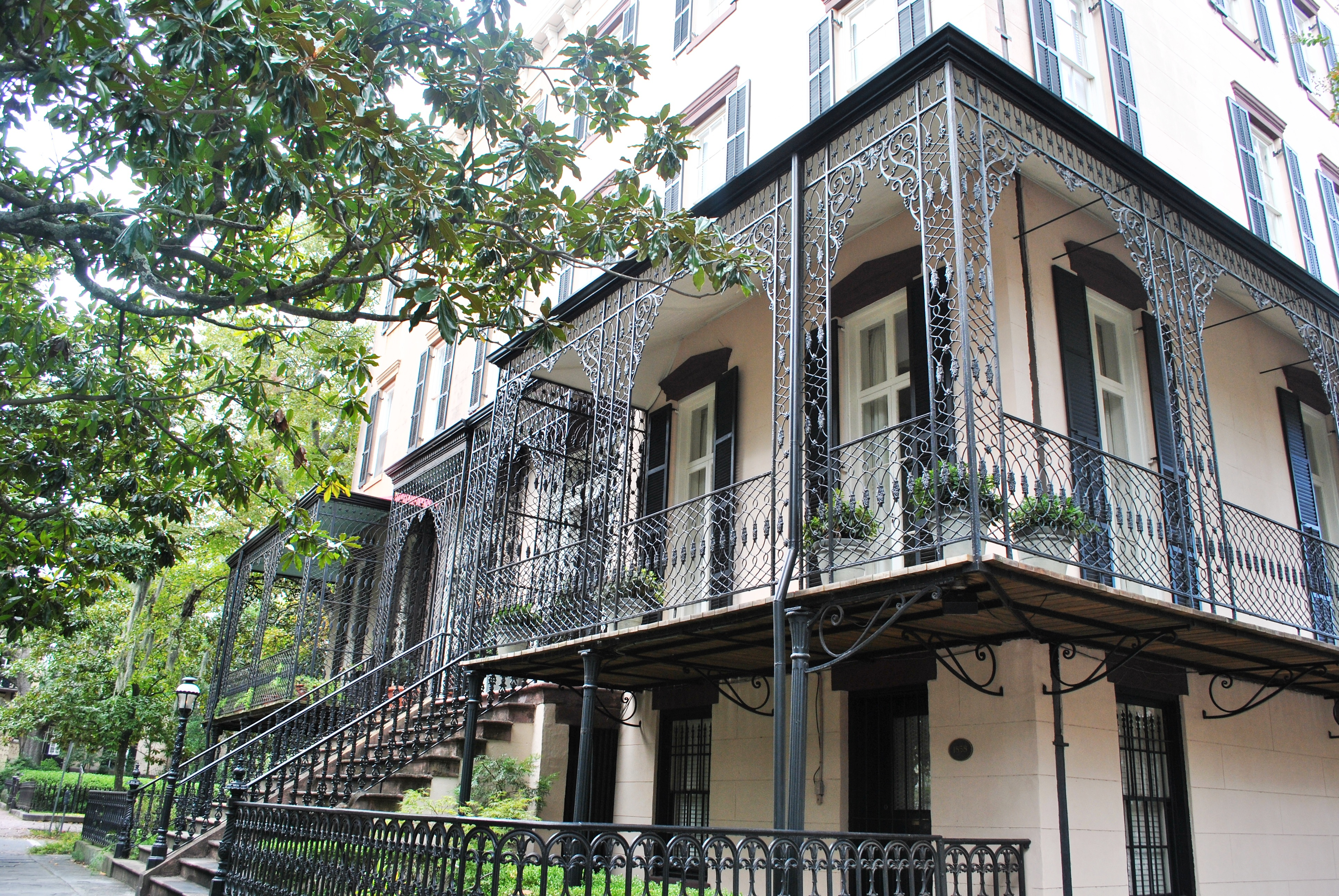
Charles W. Rogers Houses, 1858, Savannah

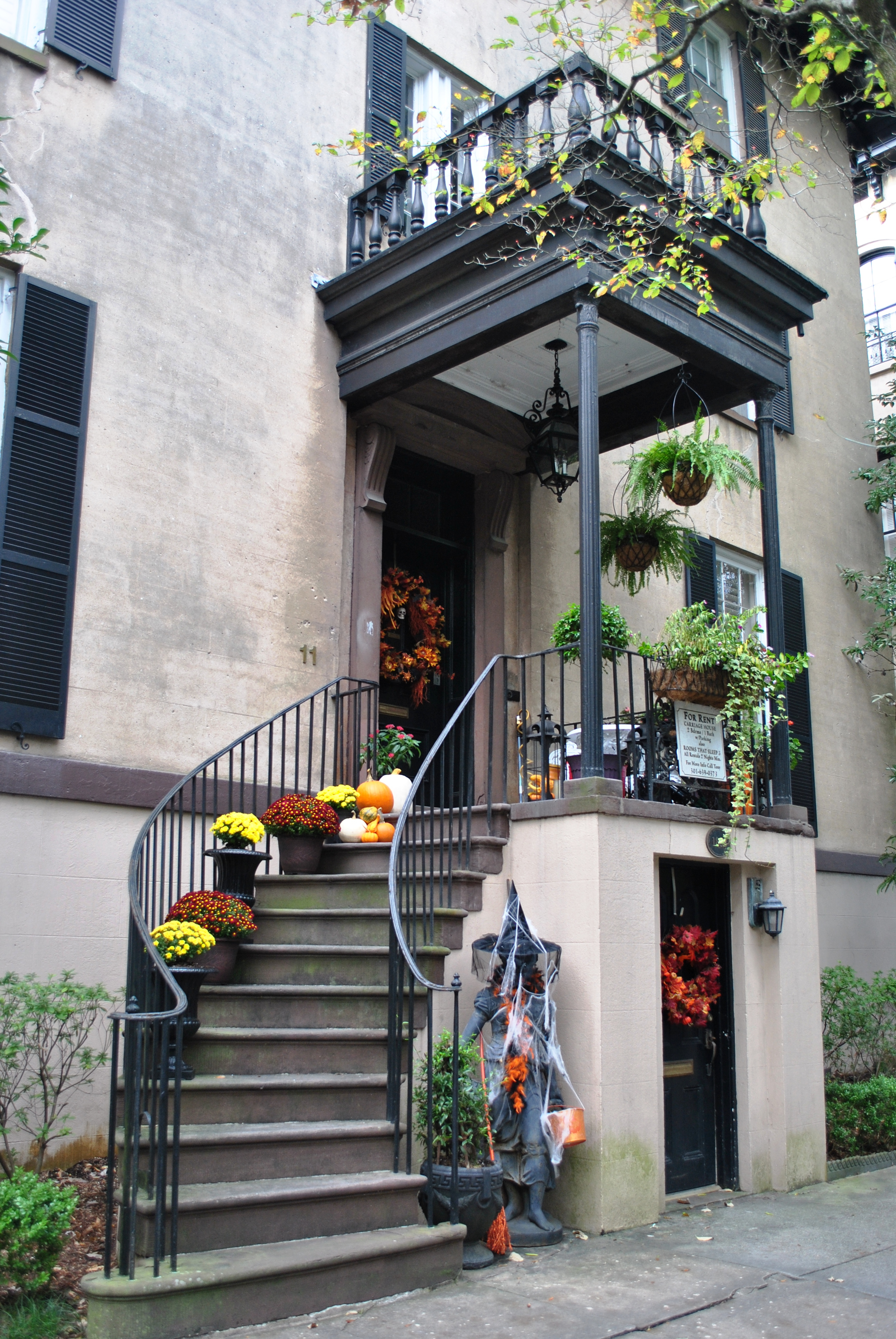
Charles B. King House, 1858, Savannah

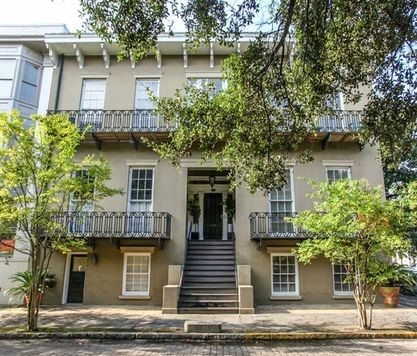
John B. Gallie House, 1858, Savannah

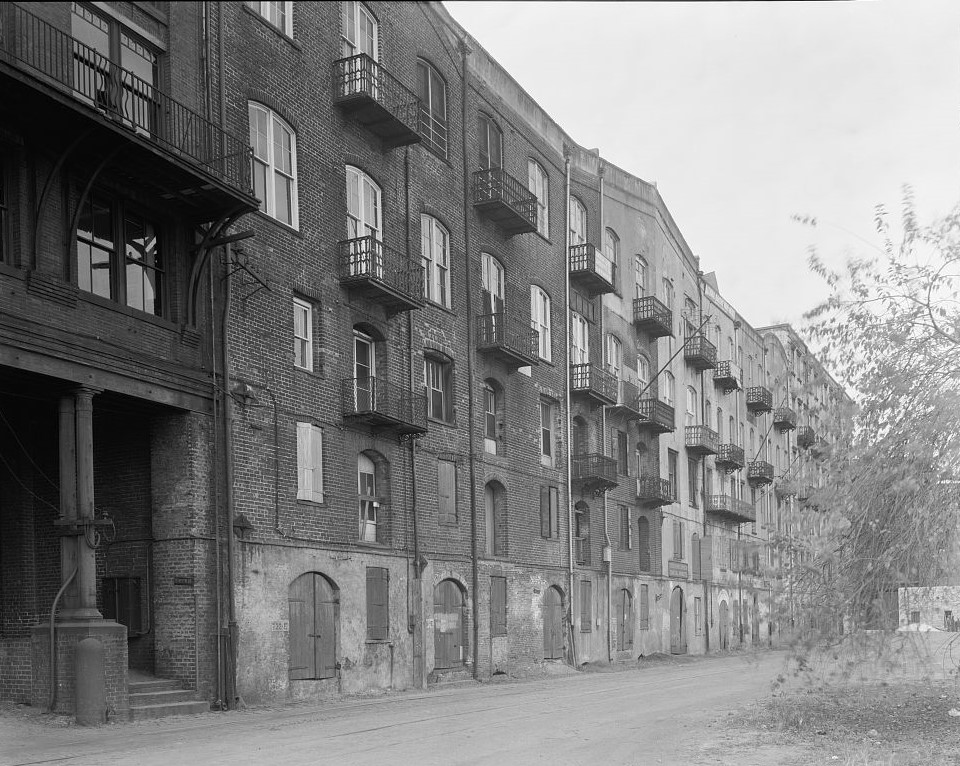
Stoddard’s Lower Range, 1858–59, Savannah

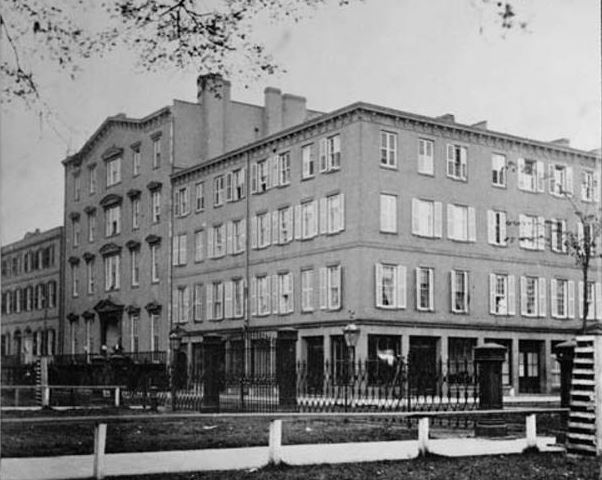
Addition to the Screven House Hotel, ca. 1858-1860, Savannah (demolished)

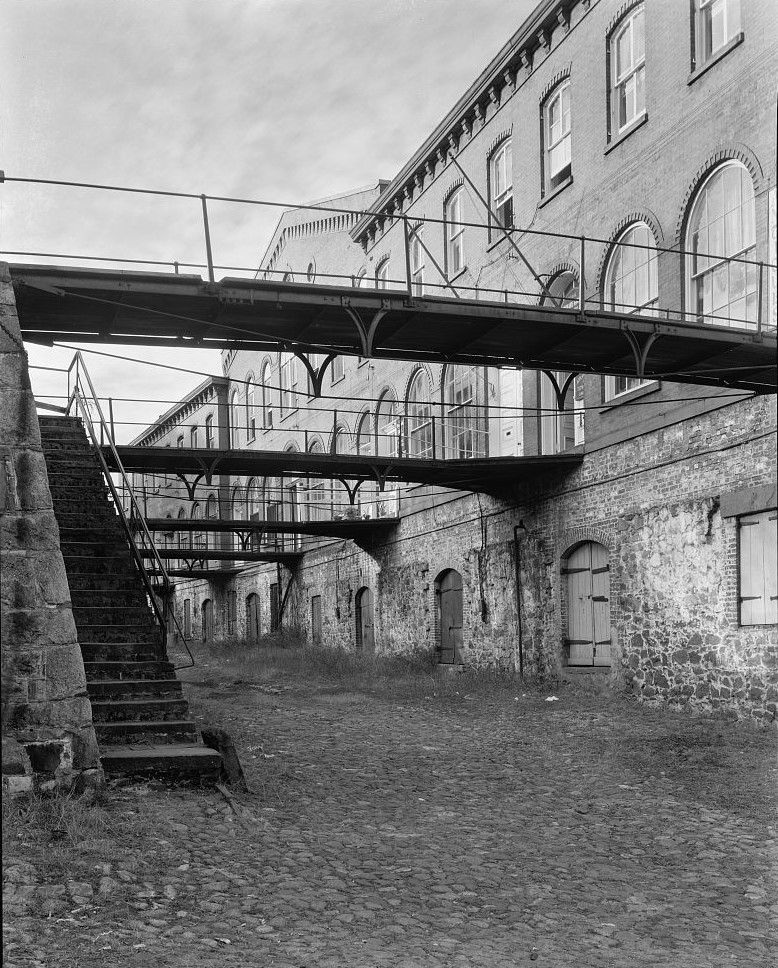
Stoddard’s Upper Range, 1859, Savannah

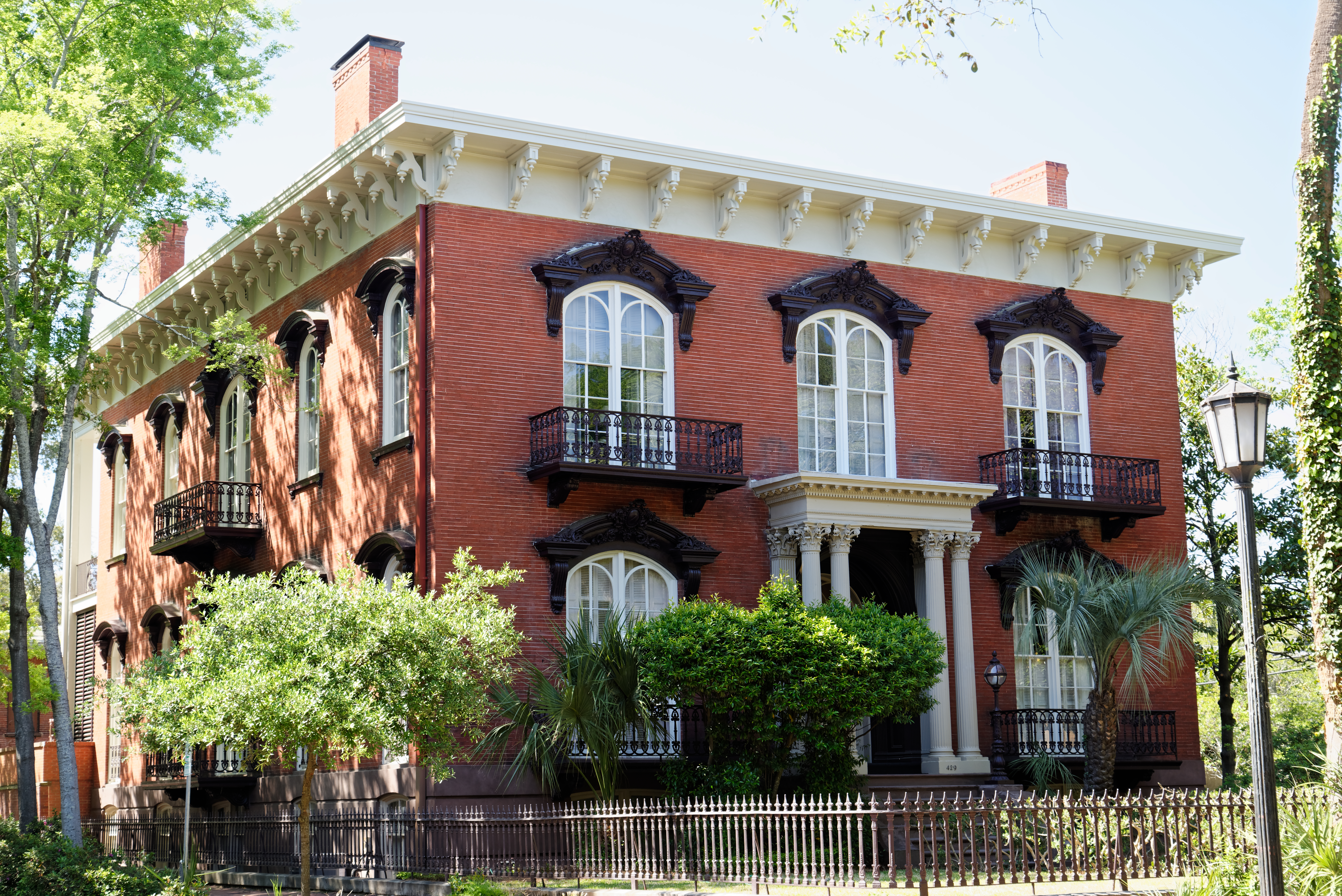
Mercer Williams House, ca. 1859-1866, Savannah
