= Peter Massie =

Scottish planter

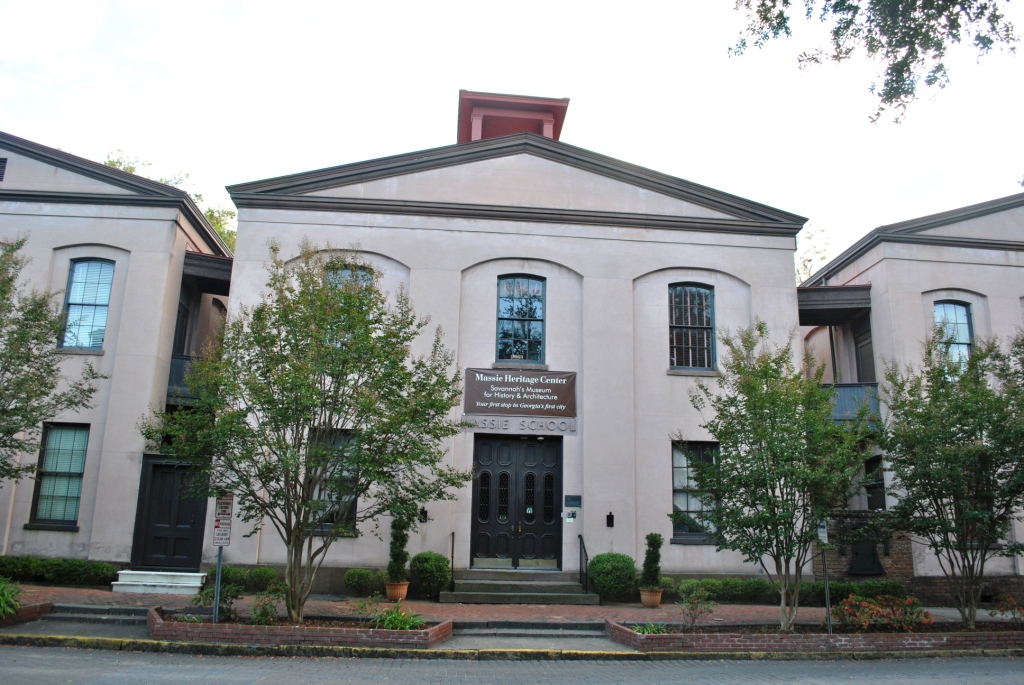
- The Massie School in Savannah, Georgia
- Born: 1767; Scotland
- Died: 5 August 1840 (aged 72–73); Elizabeth, New Jersey, U.S.
- Occupation: Planter

Peter Massie (1767 – 5 August 1840) was a Scottish planter who bequeathed the funds to establish the Massie School in Savannah, Georgia, which was in operation between 1856 and 1974.

== Career ==
After emigrating to the United States, Massie became master of Bonaventure Plantation in Thunderbolt, Georgia.

== Personal life ==
Massie was married to Sarah. His will mentioned Sarah's daughter, Anna Elizabeth, but it is not known if Massie was her father.

== Death ==
Massie died in 1840, aged 72 or 73. He is interred in the First Presbyterian Churchyard in Elizabeth, New Jersey.

At the time of his death, Massie owned over sixty slaves. He left $5,000 to the City of Savannah; to Glynn County, Georgia; and Elizabeth, New Jersey, for the establishment of free schools for the poor.

=== Legacy ===
The Massie School, located in Savannah's Taylor Square, is named for him.
