= United States Customhouse (Savannah, Georgia) =

Historic building in Savannah, Georgia, US

- U.S. Customhouse
- U.S. National Register of Historic Places
- U.S. National Historic Landmark District – Contributing property
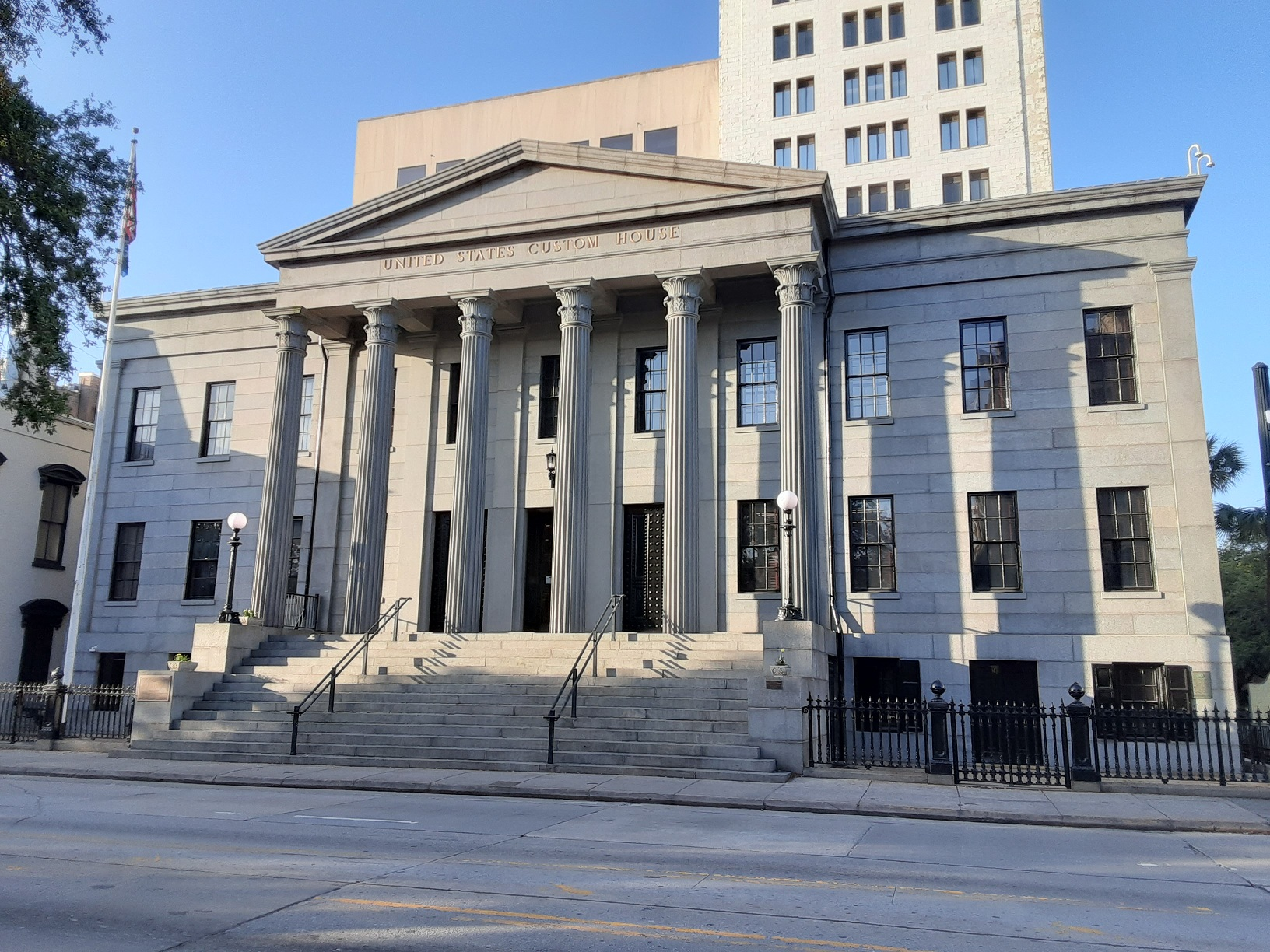
- The building in 2022

- Location within Georgia Location within the United States
- Location: 1–3 E. Bay St., Savannah, Georgia, U.S.
- Coordinates: 32.08065°N 81.09101°W
- Built: 1848
- Architect: John S. Norris
- Architectural style: Greek Revival
- Part of: Savannah Historic District (Savannah, Georgia) (ID66000277)
- NRHP reference No.: 74000666
- Added to NRHP: May 29, 1974

The U.S. Customhouse is a historic custom house located in Savannah in Chatham County, Georgia. It was built to house offices of the United States Customs Service.

== Building history ==
The U.S. Custom House symbolizes Savannah's importance to Georgia's import-export trade during the 18th and 19th centuries. The site is also significant in Savannah's history. A wood-frame residence used by James Edward Oglethorpe, founder (in 1733) of the Colony of Georgia and designer of Savannah's town plan, was previously on the site. The federal courthouse and the Tabernacle, where John Wesley preached his first sermon in America, were located on the rear of this lot.

Savannah's first U.S. Custom House opened in 1789 on Commerce Row on East Bay Street. The second, opened in 1819 on East Bryan Street, burned in 1837. In 1845 the federal government purchased a site at East Bay and Bull Streets for a third U.S. Custom House. New York architect John S. Norris (1804–1876) served as designer and supervisor of construction. The building was the first of eighteen commissions Norris designed while living in Savannah from 1846 to 1861. The cornerstone was laid on July 20, 1848.

The building was completed in 1852 and had the U.S. Post Office in the basement, the Customs Service on the first floor, and the federal courts on the second floor. The notorious case involving the yacht Wanderer was tried here in 1860. It was the last documented violation of the law against the importation of slaves. U.S. control of the building temporarily halted in January 1861 when the Confederate flag was raised above it the day after the Georgia State Convention adopted the Ordinance of Secession. In 1864 General William T. Sherman occupied Savannah and returned control of the building to the Union. In 1889 Colonel John H. Deveaux worked in the building as the first African American U.S. Customs Collector.

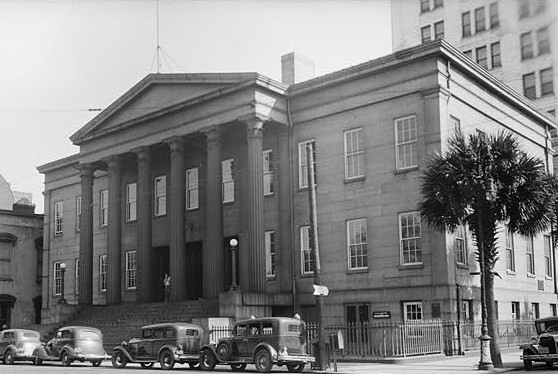
Custom House, April 1936

The U.S. Custom House was designated as a contributing building in the Savannah National Historic Landmark District in 1966. It was listed in the National Register of Historic Places in 1974.

== Architecture ==
Constructed entirely of stone, the U.S. Custom House in Savannah represents John Norris' advocacy of fireproof construction, an interest fully supported by the city, which had experienced several devastating fires over its short history. Norris' interest in fire protection was instrumental in changing the construction methods and physical appearance of buildings in Savannah through the use of materials such as brick and stone.

The U.S. Custom House opened in 1852, four years after construction began. On June 5, 1852 the Savannah Journal reported: "It must be said that if our Custom House was a long time growing, it has grown to be a perfect thing at last."

Attic staircase

The monumental Greek Revival U.S. Custom House is sited at the corner of Bull and East Bay Streets. A distinctive cast-iron fence with balusters in the design of a closed tobacco leaf and fleur-de-lis surrounds the building. The building is eleven bays wide by five bays deep and constructed of 32-inch blocks of load-bearing, gray granite stones quarried in Quincy, Massachusetts. A pedimented portico supported by six monolithic columns dominates the main facade. These columns, estimated to weigh between 15 and 20 tons each, were freighted from Massachusetts lashed to the decks of ships. It reportedly took 30 days to transport the columns from the riverbank to the site and an additional 30 days to raise them into position. The fluted columns have capitals elaborately carved with a tobacco leaf motif. The striking granite stair provides access to the ceremonial public entrance. An unadorned entablature spans the building and the words "United States Custom House" are inscribed into the frieze of the pediment.

The focal point of the interior is the magnificent solid granite stair at the center of the first floor. It is constructed so that each step locks into the next without obvious perpendicular support. A massive granite octagonal column at the basement level provides the necessary structural support for the stair. The stair's distinctive cast-iron railing consists of balusters displaying the same closed tobacco leaf motif seen on the exterior and newel posts replicating the massive granite columns on the primary exterior elevation. A semi-circular rotunda encases the stairwell and original wood panel doors follow the curvature of the surrounding walls.

Still serving its original purpose with few changes over one hundred fifty years, the U.S. Custom House is a monument to Savannah's historic importance as a port city.

== Significant events ==
- 1789: The first U.S. Custom House in Savannah opens in Commerce Row on East Bay Street.
- 1819: The second U.S. Custom House is built at East Bryan Street; the building is destroyed by fire in 1837.
- 1845: The federal government purchases a lot on the corner of East Bay and Bull Streets for the third U.S. Custom House.
- 1848–1852: The U.S. Custom House is constructed to house multiple federal agencies.
- 1860: The infamous case of the yacht "Wanderer," the last documented violation of the law against the transportation of slaves, is tried in the building.
- 1861: The Confederate flag is flown above the U.S. Custom House one day after adoption of the Ordinance of Secession by the Georgia State Convention.
- 1864: General William T. Sherman occupies Savannah securing federal property for the United States.
- 1966: The U.S. Custom House is designated as a contributing building in the Savannah National Historic Landmark District.
- 1974: The U.S. Custom House is listed in the National Register of Historic Places.

== Building facts ==
- Architect: John S. Norris
- Construction Dates: 1848–1852
- Landmark Status: Listed in the National Register of Historic Places
- Contributing building in the Savannah National Historic Landmark District
- Location: 1–3 East Bay Street
- Architectural Style: Greek Revival
- Primary Materials: Gray granite
- Prominent Features: Portico interior staircase
