= Planters Inn =

Hotel in Savannah, Georgia, US

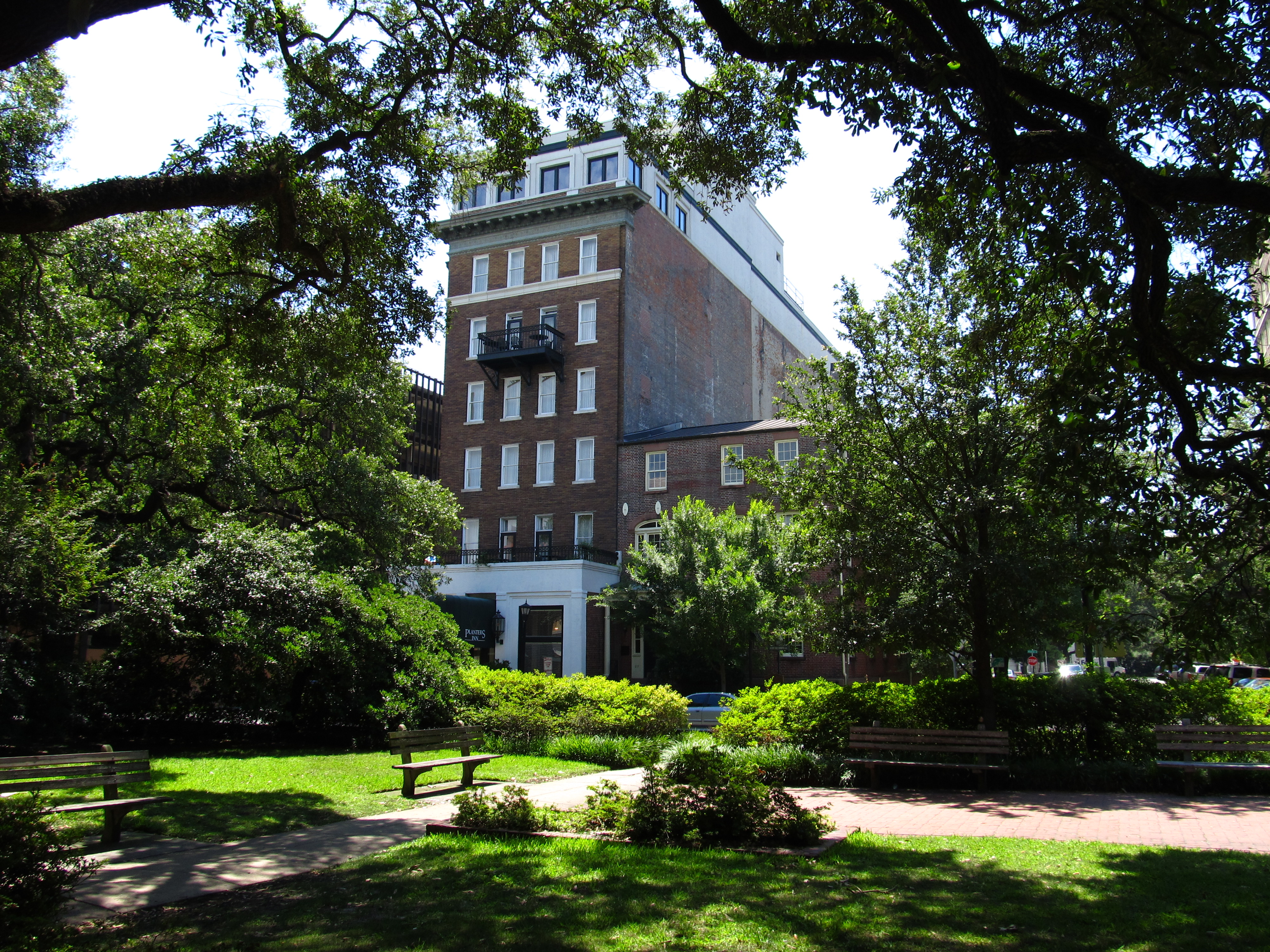
- Planters Inn, from across Reynolds Square, in 2011
- Interactive map of the Planters Inn area

General information
- Location: 29 Abercorn Street, Savannah, Georgia, United States
- Coordinates: 32.0792°N 81.08994°W
- Completed: 1913; 113 years ago
- Owner: Charlestowne Hotels

Technical details
- Floor count: 7

Planters Inn is a hotel in Savannah, Georgia, United States. It occupies the building at 29 Abercorn Street which was constructed in 1913. It stands in the southwestern trust/civic block of Reynolds Square, adjoining the Oliver Sturges House, which pre-dates it by exactly a century, being one of two houses originally on the plot. Formerly the John Wesley Hotel, Planters Inn was established in 1984. The inn has sixty rooms, and is in close proximity to the Olde Pink House restaurant.

Planters Inn is owned by the Charlestowne Hotels group.

== See also ==
- List of historic houses and buildings in Savannah, Georgia
