= Abercorn Street =

Prominent street in Savannah, Georgia

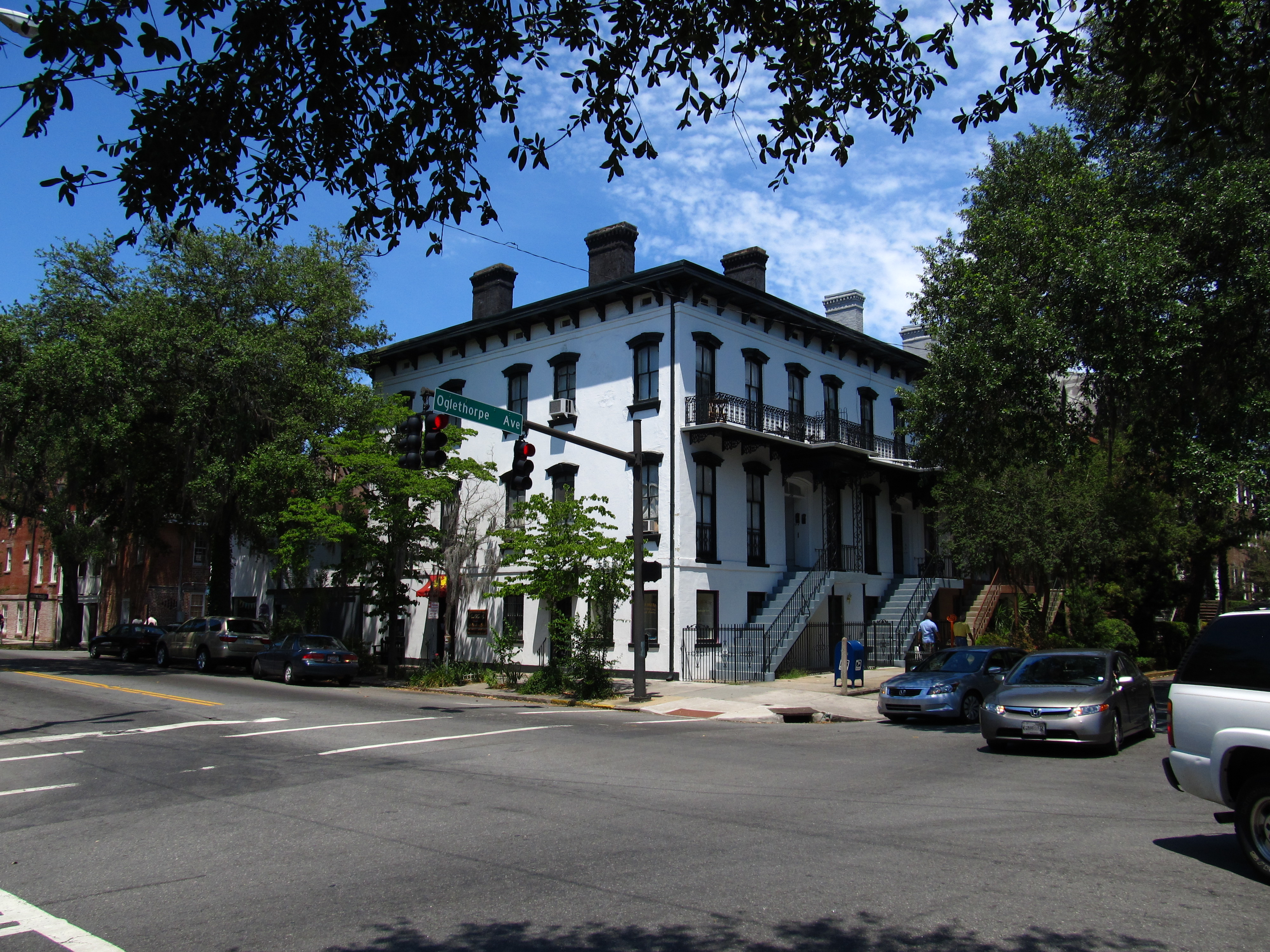
- Abercorn Street at Oglethorpe Avenue, looking northeast, 2011
- Namesake: James Hamilton, 6th Earl of Abercorn
- Length: 7.8 mi (12.6 km)
- Location: Savannah, Georgia, U.S.
- North end: East Bay Street
- South end: Harry S. Truman Parkway (SR 204)

Abercorn Street is a prominent street in Savannah, Georgia, United States. Located between Drayton Street to the west and Lincoln Street to the east, it runs for about 7.8 miles (12.6 km) from East Bay Street in the north to Harry S. Truman Parkway (State Route 204) in the south. It is concurrent with SR 204 from 37th Street south. The street is named for James Hamilton, 6th Earl of Abercorn, a financial benefactor of the Georgia colony. Its northern section passes through the Savannah Historic District, a National Historic Landmark District.

On the northern side of Bay Street, the Abercorn Street Ramp leads down through Factors Walk to River Street at the Savannah River.

Abercorn Street goes around four of Savannah's 22 squares. They are (from north to south):

- Reynolds Square
- Oglethorpe Square
- Lafayette Square
- Taylor Square

For five blocks between and Oglethorpe and Lafayette Squares, Abercorn Street forms the western boundary of Colonial Park Cemetery, which was established in 1750 (276 years ago).

== Notable buildings and structures ==
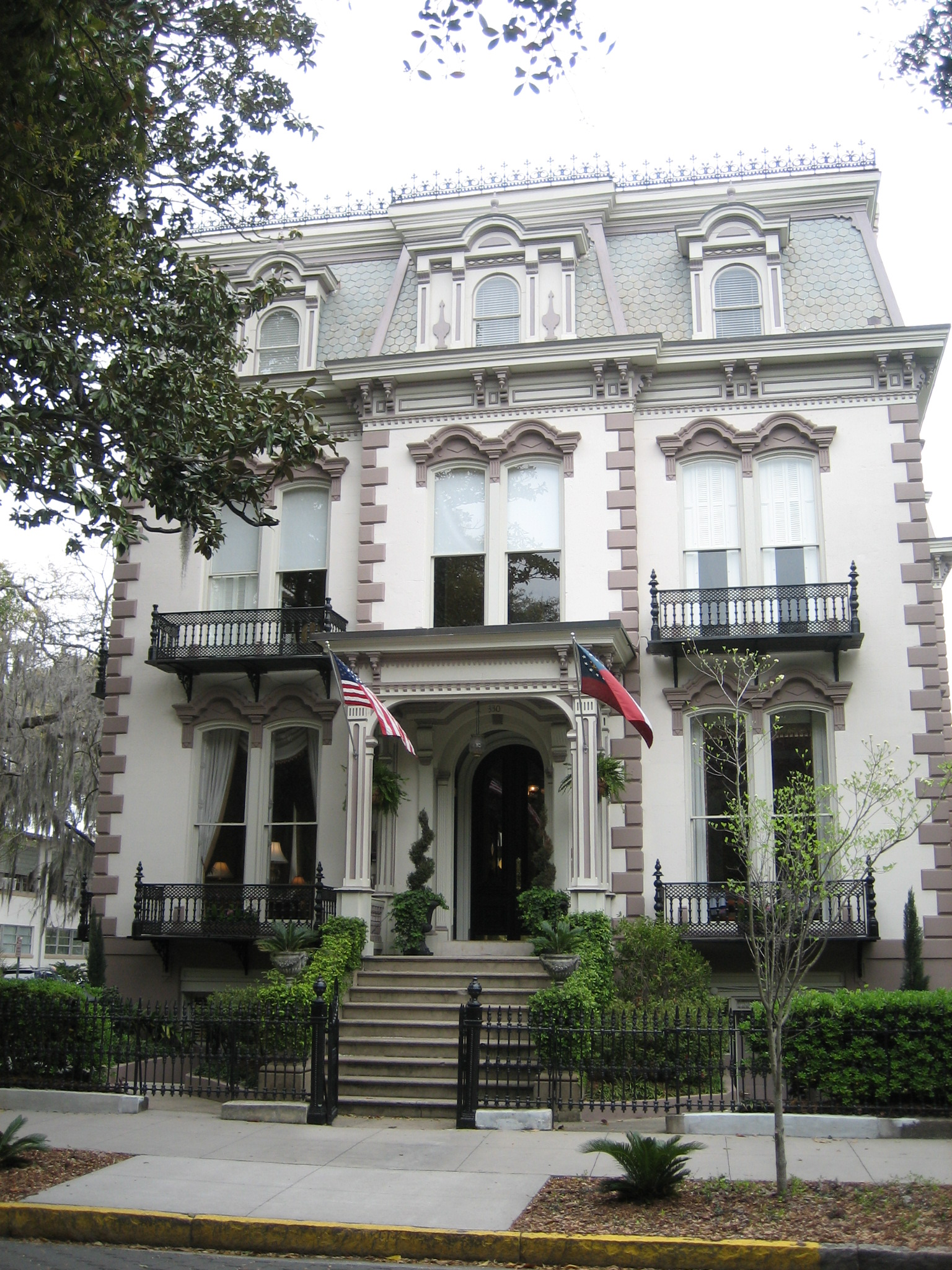
The Hamilton–Turner Inn in Lafayette Square

Below is a selection of notable buildings and structures on Abercorn Street, all in Savannah's Historic District. From north to south:

- The Olde Pink House, 23 Abercorn Street (1789)
- Oliver Sturges House, 27 Abercorn Street (1813)
- Planters Inn, 29 Abercorn Street (1913)
- Lucas Theatre, 32 Abercorn Street (1921)
- Owens–Thomas House, 124 Abercorn Street (1819)
- Mary Marshall Houses, 127–129 Abercorn Street (c. 1850)
- Andrew Low House, 329 Abercorn Street (1849)
- Hamilton–Turner Inn, 330 Abercorn Street (1873)
- Clary's Cafe, 404 Abercorn Street
- Wesley Monumental United Methodist Church, 429 Abercorn Street (1890)
- John Mingledorff Property, 439 Abercorn Street (1856)
- Algernon Hartridge House, 516 Abercorn Street (1870)

John Houstoun, Savannah's first mayor, lived in the Houston–Johnson–Screven House, at 32 Abercorn Street, which was built around 1784. The home was demolished in 1920 to make way for the Lucas Theatre.

== References in popular culture ==
The street is featured several times in John Berendt's 1994 book Midnight in the Garden of Good and Evil.

We drove south on Abercorn Street. Within a few blocks, the restrained architecture of the historic district gave way to late-Victorian flights of fancy — big old wooden houses with romantic towers, gables, and elaborate gingerbread trim. A few were restored, but most were in very poor condition.

— John Berendt, on a drive with Lee Adler

In the subsequent 1997 movie, The Lady Chablis says her fourth boyfriend "is a mechanic over there on Abercorn", to which John Cusack's character John Kelso replies, "I know where that is." A celebration of the life of The Lady Chablis took place at the Lucas Theatre on Abercorn Street in November 2016, two months after her death.
