= Marshall Daugherty =

American sculptor

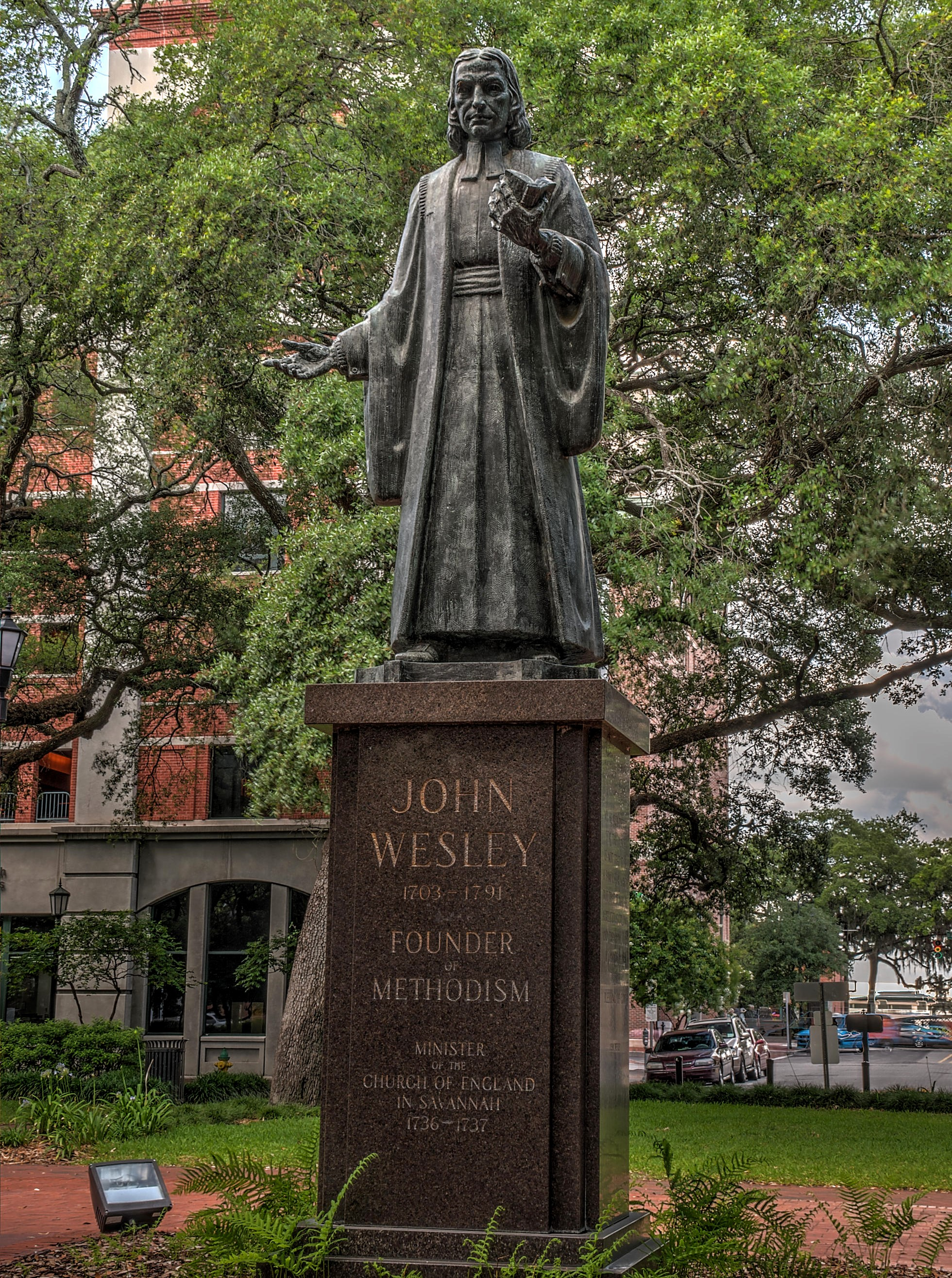
- John Wesley Statue, Reynolds Square, Savannah, Georgia
- Born: Marshall Harrison Daugherty; September 6, 1915; Seattle, Washington, U.S.
- Died: April 28, 1991 (aged 75)
- Known for: Sculpture

Marshall Harrison Daugherty (September 6, 1915 – April 28, 1991) was an American sculptor active in the mid-to-late 20th century.

== Life and career ==
Daugherty was born in 1915 in Seattle, Washington.

He studied at Yale University with Robert Eberhard and with Carl Milles at Cranbrook Educational Community in Bloomfield Hills, Michigan.

Around 1934, when Daugherty was in his late teens, he met writer Harry Stillwell Edwards at Kingfisher Cabin on Edwards's plantation at Holly Bluff, near Macon, Georgia, where Daugherty was chair of the art department at Mercer University. Daugherty founded the department in 1946 with Tony Stansfeld. Daugherty later sculpted a bust of Edwards.

Daugherty married Gertrude Earle "Trudy" Baker, with whom he had two daughters: Deryl Dantzler and Carla McAuley.

Of the statue of John Wesley that was erected in 1969 in Reynolds Square, Savannah, Georgia, Marshall said: "The moment is as he looks up from his Bible toward his congregation, about to speak and stretching out his right hand in love, invitation, and exhortation. In contrast, the hand holding the Bible is intense and powerful – the point of contact with the Almighty."

Daugherty died in 1991, aged 75. He had lost his eyesight around a decade earlier. His wife survived him by twenty years; she died in 2011, aged 92.

== Selected works ==
- John Wesley Statue, Reynolds Square, Savannah, Georgia (1989)
- Harry Stillwell Edwards Bust (now at the Washington Memorial Library in Macon, Georgia; c. 1936)
- Young Pan (1986)

In 1981, Daugherty's final statue was made for Trav and Kate Paine, in memory of their five-year-old daughter, Alice, who died from a genetic disorder the previous year, having been ill for three years. The statue was stolen in September 2010, but it was recovered the following month after investigative work by Natalie Spires, a family member and prosecutor.
