= Houston–Johnson–Screven House =

Former house in Savannah, Georgia

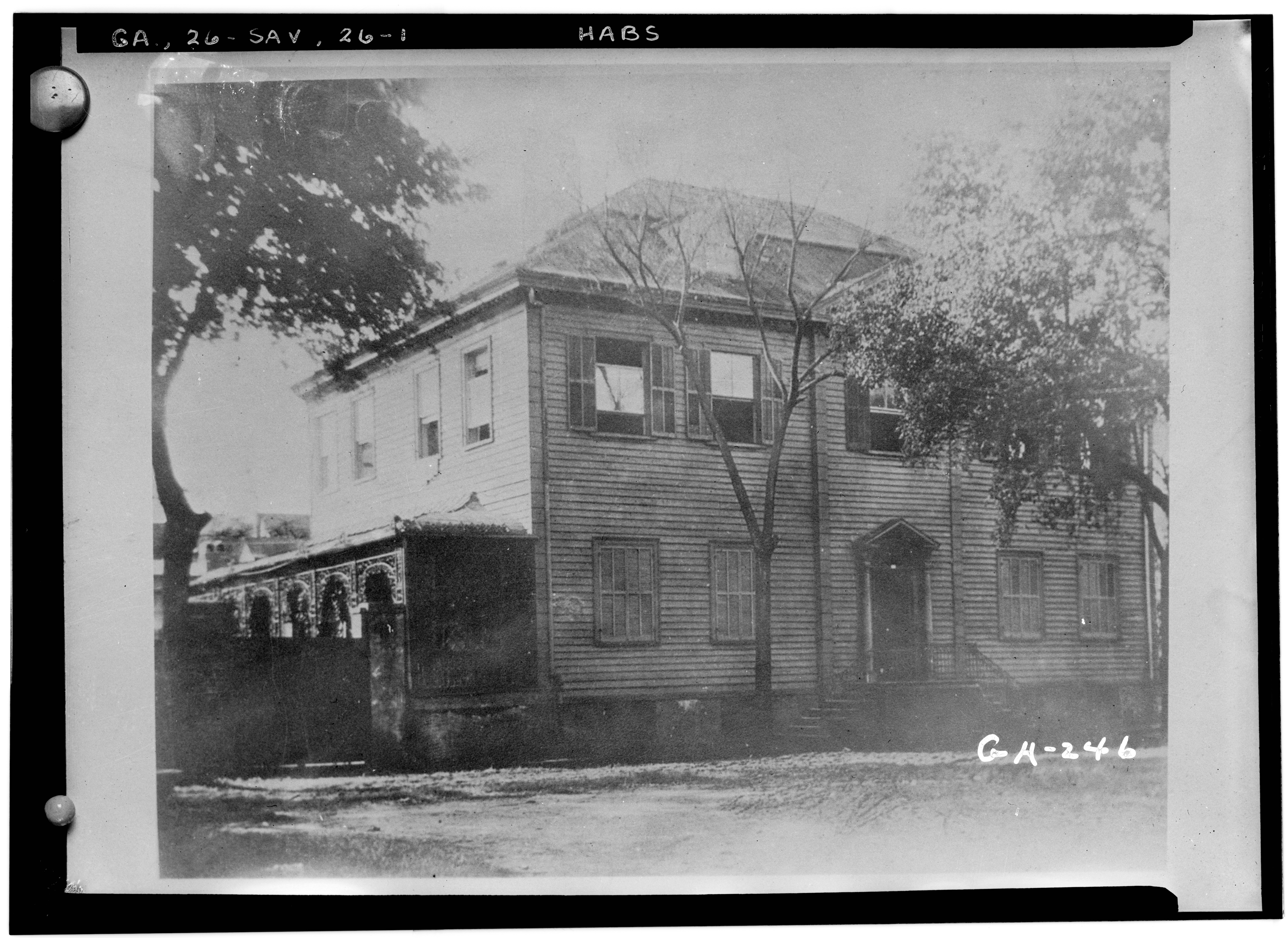
- The building in the first half of the 20th century
- Interactive map of the Houston–Johnson–Screven House area
- Alternative names: Houston–Screven House

General information
- Location: Savannah, Georgia, U.S., Abercorn Street
- Coordinates: 32°4′43.5″N 81°5′21″W
- Completed: c. 1784
- Demolished: 1920 (106 years ago)

Technical details
- Floor count: 2

The Houston–Johnson–Screven House (also known as the Houston–Screven House) was a home in Savannah, Georgia, United States. It stood at the corner of Abercorn Street and East Congress Street, in the southeastern residential/tything block of Reynolds Square, from around 1784 until the building's demolition in 1920. It was replaced the following year by the Lucas Theatre.

Lawrence Bradley, on behalf of the Library of Congress's Historic American Buildings Survey, photographed the building in the first half of the 20th century.

The home was built for Savannah's first mayor John Houstoun. Along with Habersham House and the William Hunter House, it was one of Reynolds Square's "grandes maisons."

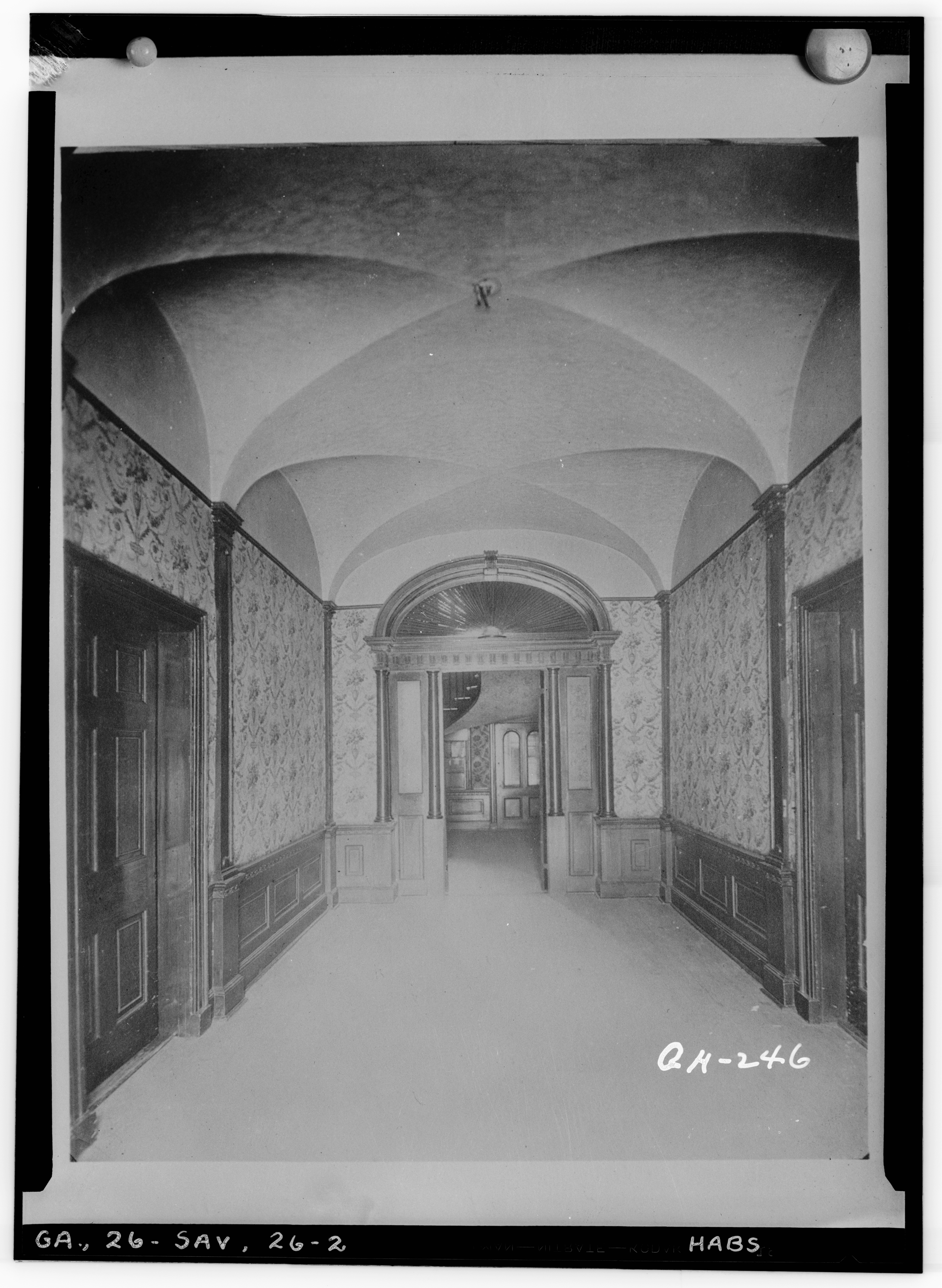
Front hall

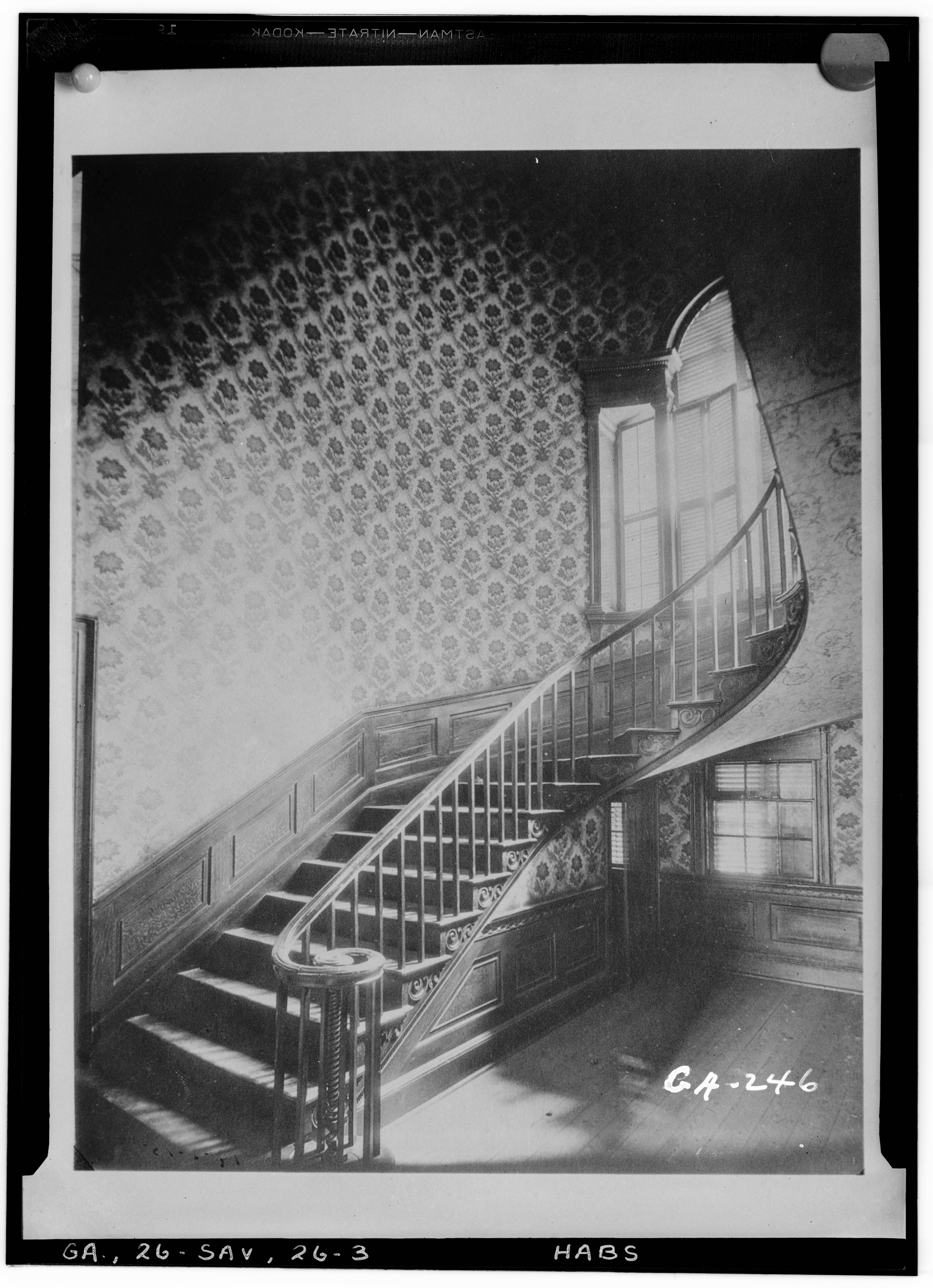
Staircase
