= John Houstoun =

American politician (1744–1796)

Governor John Houstoun
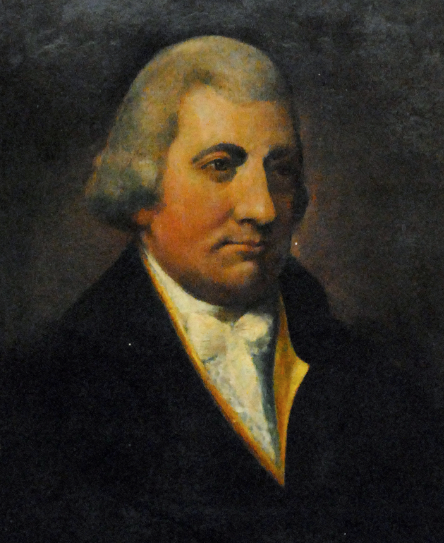

10th Governor of Georgia
- In office January 10, 1778 – January 7, 1779
- Preceded by: John A. Treutlen
- Succeeded by: William Glascock
- In office January 9, 1784 – January 6, 1785
- Preceded by: Lyman Hall
- Succeeded by: Samuel Elbert

Speaker of the Georgia House of Representatives
- In office 1783

1st Mayor of Savannah, Georgia
- In office 1790–1791
- Preceded by: Position Established
- Succeeded by: Thomas Gibbons

Personal details
- Born: August 31, 1744 St. George's Parish, Georgia (modern-day Waynesboro, Georgia)
- Died: July 20, 1796 (aged 51) Savannah, Georgia, U.S.
- Spouse: Hannah Bryan

John Houstoun (/ˈhoʊstən/ HOU-stən; August 31, 1744 – July 20, 1796) was an American lawyer and statesman from Savannah, Georgia. He was one of the original Sons of Liberty and also a delegate for Georgia in the Second Continental Congress in 1775. He was the governor of Georgia from 1778 – 1779 and again from 1784 – 1785.

== Personal life ==
John was born to aristocratic Scots immigrants in St. George's Parish, near modern Waynesboro and the eastern border of Georgia. His parents were Sir Patrick (Baronet) and Priscilla (Dunbar) Houstoun. His father served as the registrar of land grants for the Georgia Colony and the collector of quit-rents (a permanent annual tax on each grant). John was educated in Savannah and read law there. He was admitted to the bar and started a law practice in Savannah.

Houstoun married Hannah Bryan, whose father Jonathan was a wealthy Savannah merchant. They built their home, White Bluff, about nine miles (14 km) northwest of Savannah. The couple had no children.

== Revolutionary years ==
Houstoun was a successful lawyer, and was appointed to the Governor's Council by James Wright. But in 1774, Houstoun was one of the founders of the nascent revolutionary government in Georgia. He joined with Archibald Bulloch and others to form a Committee of Correspondence in support of the residents of Boston suffering the effects of the Boston Port Act. The committee went on to create formal protests against other measures brought about by the Intolerable Acts.

That same year, John was a representative in the rebel Provincial Congress of Georgia, and they named him as a delegate to the First Continental Congress. He declined, since fewer than half the counties were represented in the Provincial Congress. By 1775 this defect was remedied and he accepted that appointment. In Congress, he was a strong supporter of the movement toward independence, but resisted the non-importation agreements because of their negative effects on the southern colonies.

He was reappointed to the national congress in 1776, but did not attend. He stayed at home to work with the Committee of Safety to thwart the loyalist efforts of the popular preacher and loyalist, John Zubly. Early in 1778, he was elected as the second revolutionary Governor of Georgia also being the first governor of Georgia to be born in Georgia. That same year, he took charge of the Georgia militia in an abortive attempt to seize the British post of St. Augustine, Florida. His disagreements with the Continental Army commander, Robert Howe, contributed greatly to the failure of the expedition. When the British, in response, captured Savannah on December 29, Houstoun was forced into hiding.

Creek Indians raided plantations and carried slaves off from within a few miles of Savannah. The "daily depredations" of these raiding groups, Governor Houstoun wrote, "almost at our very Town-Gates, threaten us with certain ruin unless some remedy is applied."

Houstoun lived in the Houston–Johnson–Screven House, at 32 Abercorn Street, which was built around 1784. The home was demolished in 1920 to make way for the Lucas Theatre.

== Later career ==
After the surrender at Yorktown, the British abandoned Savannah in 1782. Houstoun returned home, taking a seat in the Georgia House of Representatives, where he briefly served as Speaker in 1783. He then was elected to another one-year term as governor in 1784.

Houstoun pushed for more access to the Indian Country. "Formerly when the people of Pensacola and Mobile were one and the same with Us, we did not carry on trade with you from this Country, and then there was no Occasion to ask a Path thro’ the Creek Nation." Since the Spanish controlled Florida, he wanted more east-west trade routes. The Creeks declined to grant the Choctaws access to the Georgia traders.

On September 28, 1784, Governor John Houstoun granted four 5000 acre tracts of vacant land in Franklin county, Georgia to French Vice Admiral d'Estaing and his heirs. The four bountyland grants totaling 20,000 acres were subsequently registered on June 13, 1785.

In 1790 he became the first elected Mayor of Savannah, and in 1791 was appointed a justice of the Superior Court of Georgia. After 1792 he served as president of the Chatham Academy.

== Legacy ==
Houstoun died at his home, White Bluff, just outside Savannah on July 20, 1796. Houston County in central Georgia was named for him. The variation in spelling is typical of early nineteenth century orthography.

== See also ==
- List of speakers of the Georgia House of Representatives

Political offices
Preceded by John A. Treutlen	Governor of Georgia; 1778–1779	Succeeded by John Wereat
Preceded by Lyman Hall	Governor of Georgia; 1784–1785	Succeeded by Samuel Elbert
Preceded by City incorporated in 1789–90	Mayor of Savannah; 1790–1791	Succeeded by Thomas Gibbons
