= Savannah Philharmonic Orchestra =

Savannah Philharmonic
- Orchestra
- Founded: 2009; 17 years ago
- Concert hall: Lucas Theatre
- Principal conductor: Keitaro Harada
- Website: www.savannahphilharmonic.org

The Savannah Philharmonic is an American professional orchestra that performs concerts in Savannah, Georgia. It is also a 501(c)(3) nonprofit organization. The orchestra made its debut in January 2009 under conductor Peter Shannon and is currently guided by the baton of maestro Keitaro Harada.
