= Clary's Cafe =

Restaurant in Savannah, Georgia, U.S.

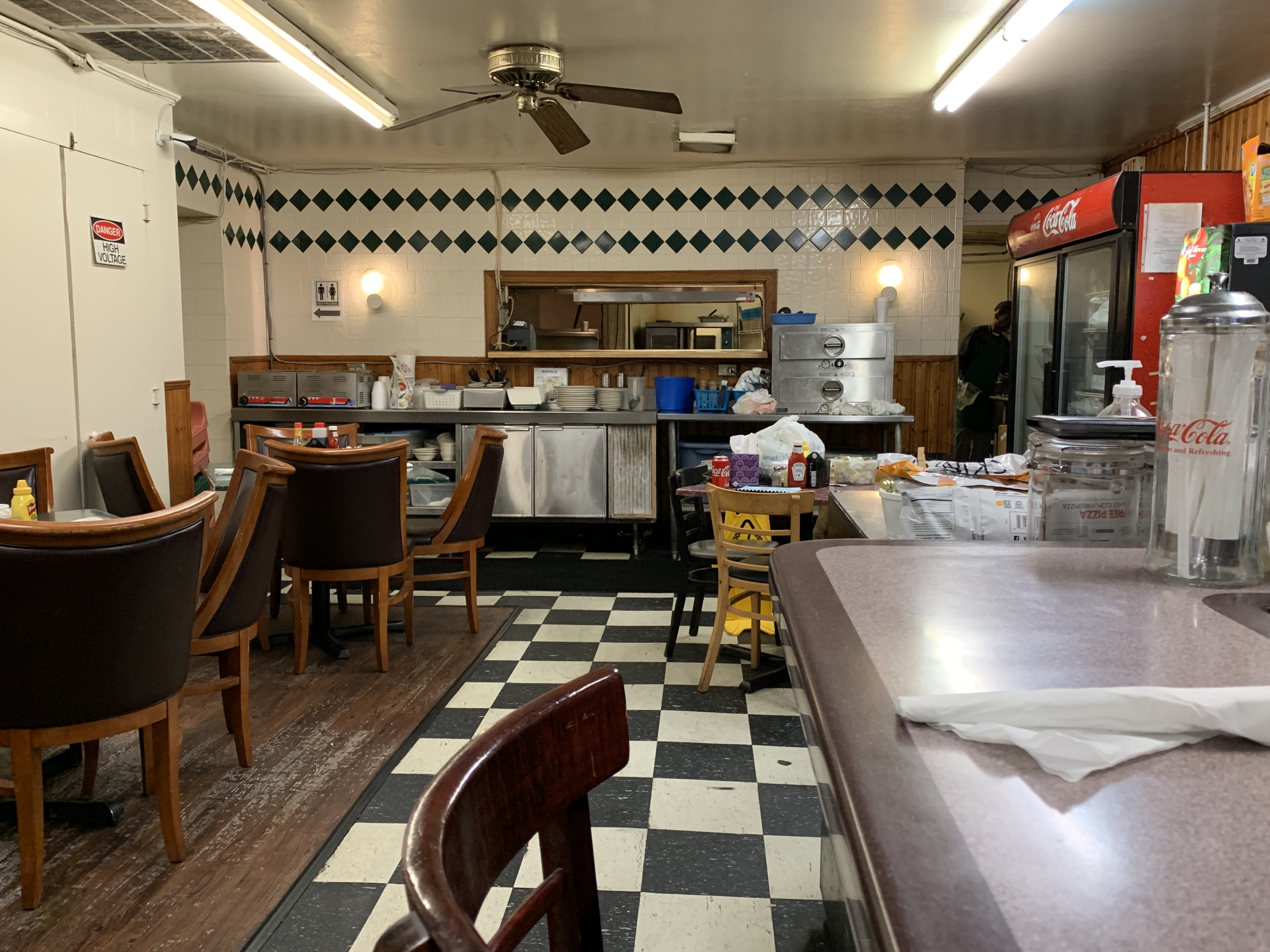
- The counter, part of the dining area, and kitchen (2019)

- Location within Georgia

Restaurant information
- Established: 1903
- Food type: Breakfast and lunch
- Dress code: Casual
- Location: 404 Abercorn Street, Savannah, Chatham County, Georgia, 31401
- Coordinates: 32.0716606451°N 81.09198937°W
- Website: https://claryscafe.com/

Clary's Cafe is a restaurant in Savannah, Georgia, United States. Established at 404 Abercorn Street in 1903, originally as a drug store, its popularity increased markedly after its appearance in both John Berendt's Midnight in the Garden of Good and Evil 1994 novel and Clint Eastwood's 1997 movie adaptation.

== Midnight in the Garden of Good and Evil ==
The author of Midnight in the Garden of Good and Evil, John Berendt, described Clary's as "a clearinghouse of information, a bourse of gossip," where he came to know the characters who would animate his narrative.

A photograph of the cast hangs inside the restaurant, featuring Alison Eastwood (who plays Mandy), her father, Clint Eastwood (director), The Lady Chablis, John Cusack (John Kelso), Kevin Spacey (Jim Williams) and Jack Thompson (Sonny Seiler).

John Cusack (as John Kelso) inside the cafe in a scene from the movie, filmed in 1996

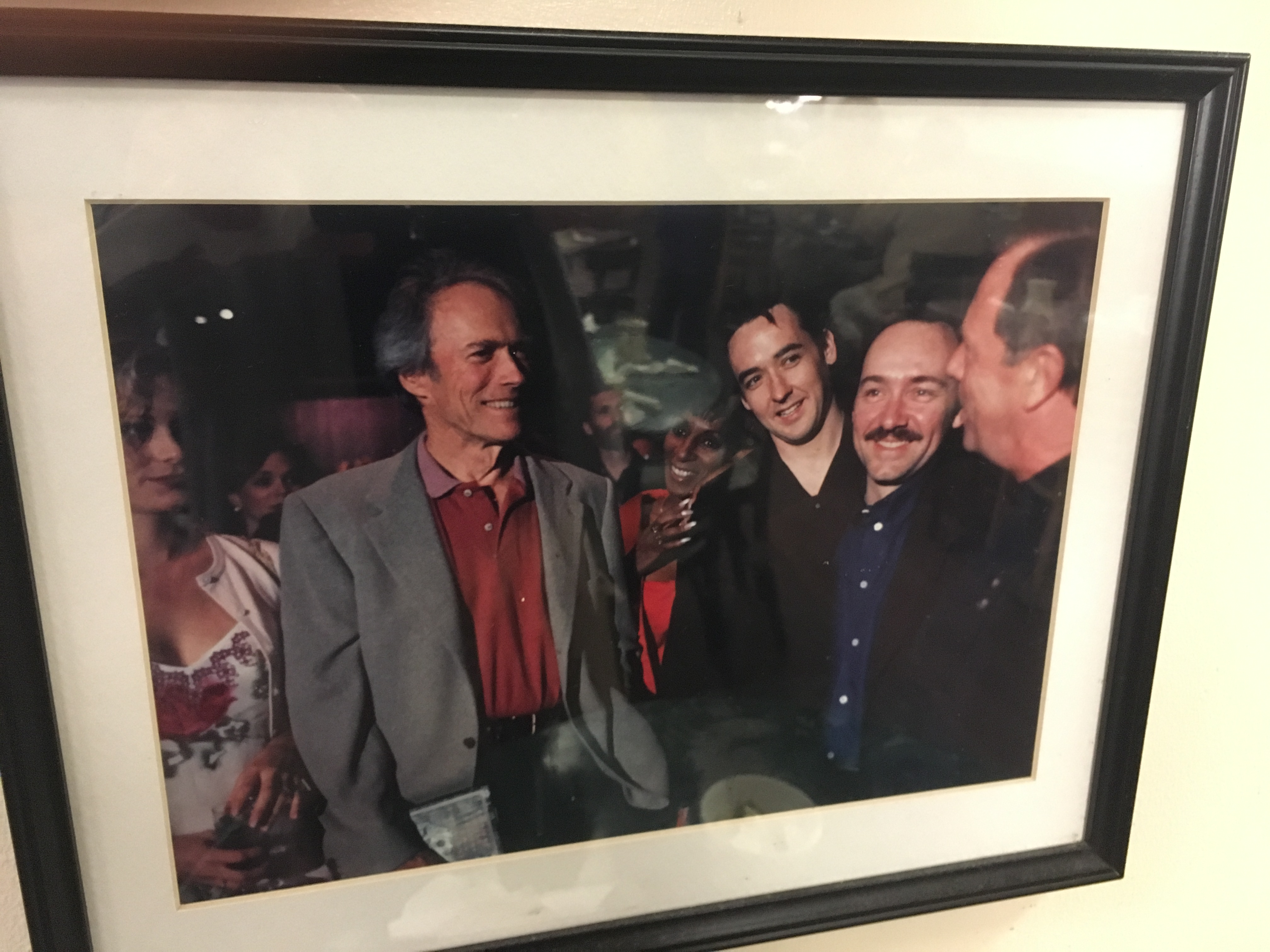
Photograph in the restaurant of the cast of Midnight in the Garden of Good and Evil
