= Lucas Theatre =

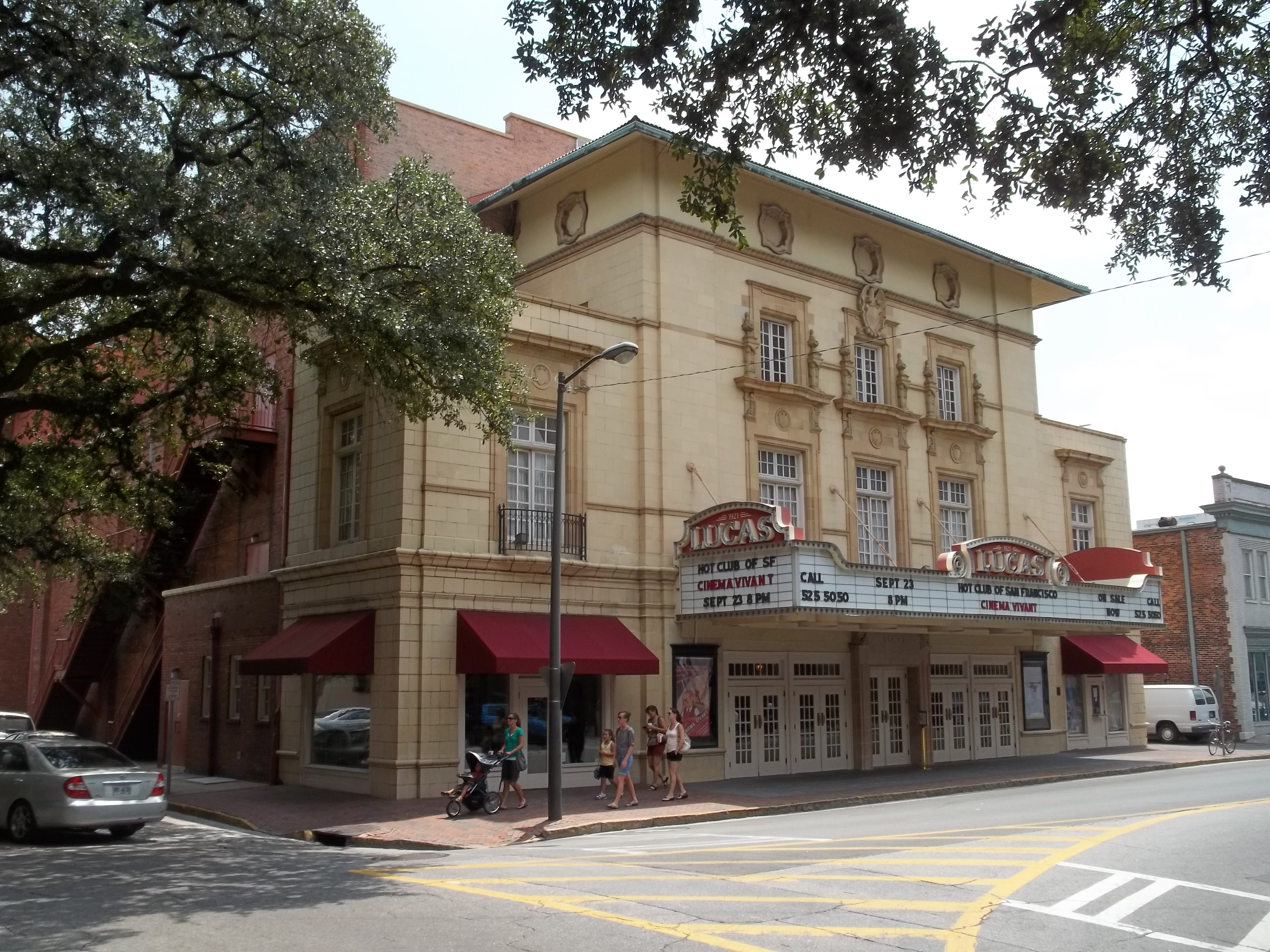
- Lucas Theatre (2011)
- Interactive map of the Lucas Theatre area
- Alternative names: Lucas Theatre for the Arts

General information
- Architectural style: Spanish Baroque
- Location: 32 Abercorn Street; Savannah, Georgia, United States
- Coordinates: 32.0788°N 81.0893°W
- Opened: December 26, 1921
- Owner: Savannah College of Art and Design

Design and construction
- Architect: Claude K. Howell

The Lucas Theatre is a theater on Abercorn Street in Reynolds Square, Savannah, Georgia, United States. Built in 1921, the theater closed in 1976 and was slated to be demolished, but preservation efforts led to it reopening in 2000. It is managed by the Savannah College of Art and Design as the Lucas Theatre for the Arts and is the home venue for the Savannah Philharmonic Orchestra.

== History ==
The theatre was the idea of Arthur Lucas, a businessman from Atlanta who named it after himself. Lucas's first theater was opened in Savannah in 1907; he later owned several dozen theaters throughout Georgia, including the Fox Theatre in Atlanta. The Lucas Theatre was designed by architect Claude K. Howell in the Spanish Baroque style and opened to the public on December 26, 1921. John Houstoun, Savannah's first mayor, lived in the Houston–Johnson–Screven House, which was built around 1784. The home was demolished in 1920 to make way for the Lucas Theatre.

At the time of its construction, it had a capacity of about 1,700, and some called it the "Jewel of Savannah". The building's interior featured a large dome and marble floors, while the exterior featured a large wrought iron marquee. In May 1927, it became the first building in Savannah to have air conditioning. At some time in the 1930s, the wrought iron marquee was replaced by a neon sign.

Following World War II, downtown Savannah experienced a downturn, and the theater deteriorated. It closed in 1976 and the building later housed a comedy club and restaurant. In 1986, it was slated to be demolished and replaced by a parking garage, but a group of Savannahians organized to prevent its demolition. They purchased the building and began extensive renovations. During the filming of Midnight in the Garden of Good and Evil in 1997, members of the film crew, including the director, Clint Eastwood, and leading actor, Kevin Spacey, participated in fundraising events.

The Lucas Theatre reopened in 2000 with a screening of the film Gone with the Wind. It is managed by the Savannah College of Art and Design and is the home venue for the Savannah Philharmonic Orchestra, in addition to hosting the annual Savannah Film Festival and the Savannah Music Festival. The theatre's Wurlitzer organ, produced in 1925, had been disassembled, stored in a barn, and damaged in a fire; with the assistance of the American Theatre Organ Society, it was restored and reinstalled in the theater in 2023, with seven ranks of pipes added to the original eleven.

The building is located in the Savannah Historic District.
