= Reynolds Square (Savannah, Georgia) =

Public square in Savannah, Georgia

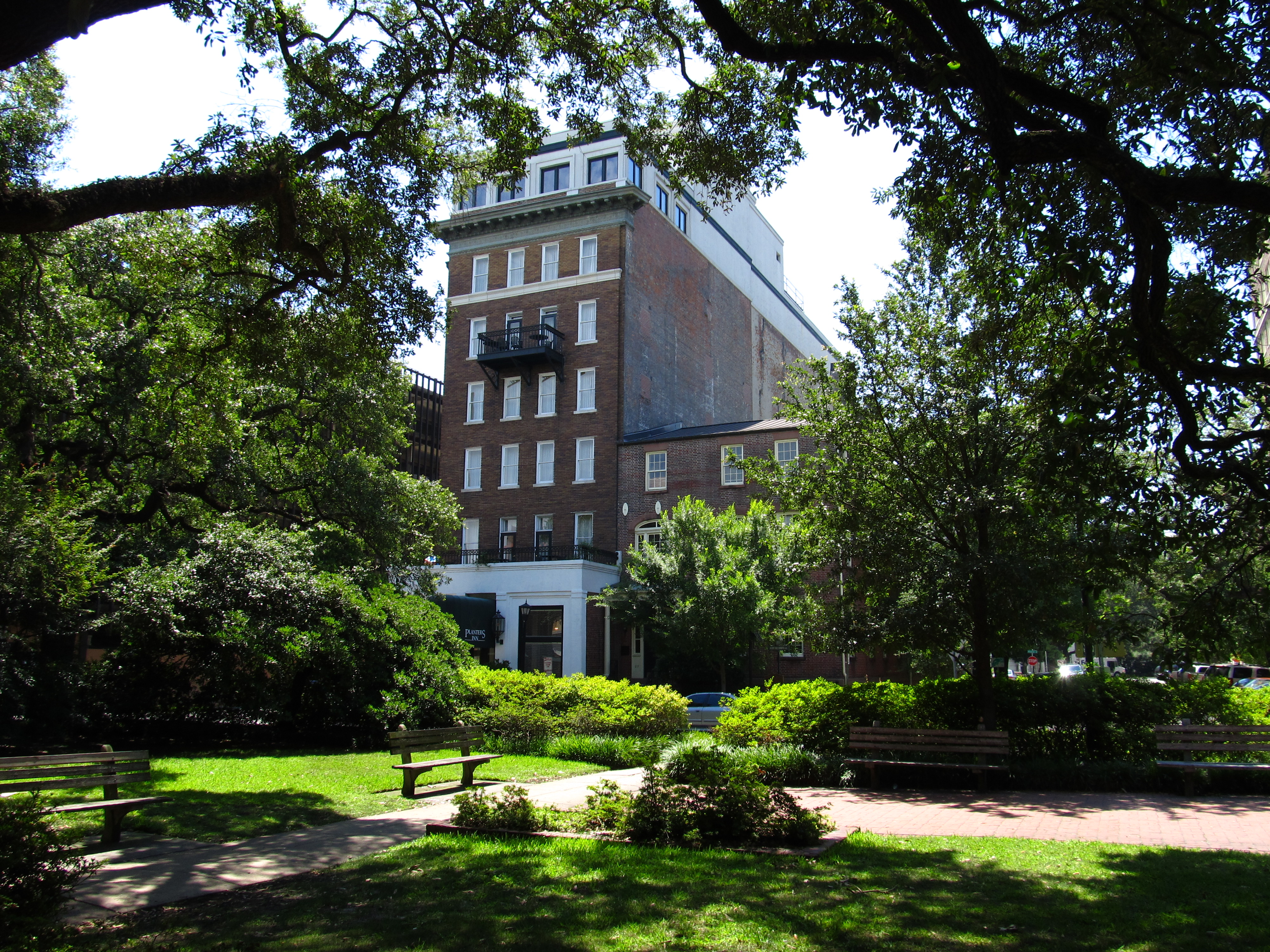
- Planters Inn, overlooking the square
- Interactive map of Reynolds Square
- Former name: Lower New Square
- Namesake: Captain John Reynolds
- Maintained by: City of Savannah
- Location: Savannah, Georgia, U.S.
- Coordinates: 32.0793°N 81.0892°W
- North: Abercorn Street
- East: East St. Julian Street
- South: Abercorn Street
- West: East St. Julian Street

Construction
- Completion: 1734 (292 years ago)

Reynolds Square is one of the 22 squares of Savannah, Georgia, United States. It is located in the northernmost row of the city's five rows of squares, on Abercorn Street and East St. Julian Street. It is east of Johnson Square, west of Warren Square and north of Oglethorpe Square. The oldest building on the square is The Olde Pink House (originally Habersham House), which dates to 1771.

Originally called Lower New Square (due to its being the first one laid out, in 1734, after the original four), it was later renamed for Captain John Reynolds, governor of Georgia in the mid-1750s. Reynolds was, in fact, an unpopular governor, and it is said that the celebration held upon his arrival in the colony was rivaled only by that held upon his departure.

The square contains a bronze statue, by Marshall Daugherty, honoring John Wesley, founder of Methodism. Wesley spent most of his life in England but undertook a mission to Savannah between 1735 and 1738, during which time he founded the first Sunday school in America. The statue was installed in 1969 on the spot where Wesley's home is believed to have stood. The statue is intended to show Wesley preaching out-of-doors as he did when leading services for Native Americans, a practice which angered church elders who believed that the Gospel should only be preached inside the church building. Sculptor Marshall said: "The moment is as he looks up from his Bible toward his congregation, about to speak and stretching out his right hand in love, invitation, and exhortation. In contrast, the hand holding the Bible is intense and powerful – the point of contact with the Almighty."

Reynolds Square was the site of the Filature, which housed silkworms as part of an early—and unsuccessful—attempt to establish a silk industry in the Georgia colony.

== Dedication ==
Namesake	Image	Note
John Reynolds		The square is named for the Royal Navy officer John Reynolds.

== Markers and structures ==
Object	Image	Note
John Wesley statue		The statue, the work of Marshall Daugherty and honoring John Wesley, was installed in 1969.

== Constituent buildings ==
Each building below is in one of the eight blocks around the square composed of four residential "tything" blocks and four civic ("trust") blocks, now known as the Oglethorpe Plan. They are listed with construction years where known.

Northwestern trust/civic block

- Habersham House, 23 Abercorn Street (1771) – oldest building on the square; now The Olde Pink House
- 24 Drayton Street (1924)

Southwestern trust/civic block

- Planters Inn, 29 Abercorn Street (1913)
- Oliver Sturges House, 27 Abercorn Street (1813)

Southwestern residential/tything block

- 31–39 Abercorn Street (1920)
- (The Hunter–Mackay House, 125 East Congress Street – demolished around 1939; a parking garage now occupies the location)

Northeastern residential/tything block

- Christ Church parish house, 18 Abercorn Street (1911) (formerly the Leroy Myers Cigar Company)
- 9 Lincoln Street (1853)
- 226 East Bryan Street (17 Lincoln Street) (1852) – now Abe's on Lincoln (ground floor)

Southeastern trust/civic block

- 28 Abercorn Street (1919)

Southeastern residential/tything block

- Lucas Theatre, 32 Abercorn Street (1921) (the former location of the Houston–Johnson–Screven House)

== Gallery ==
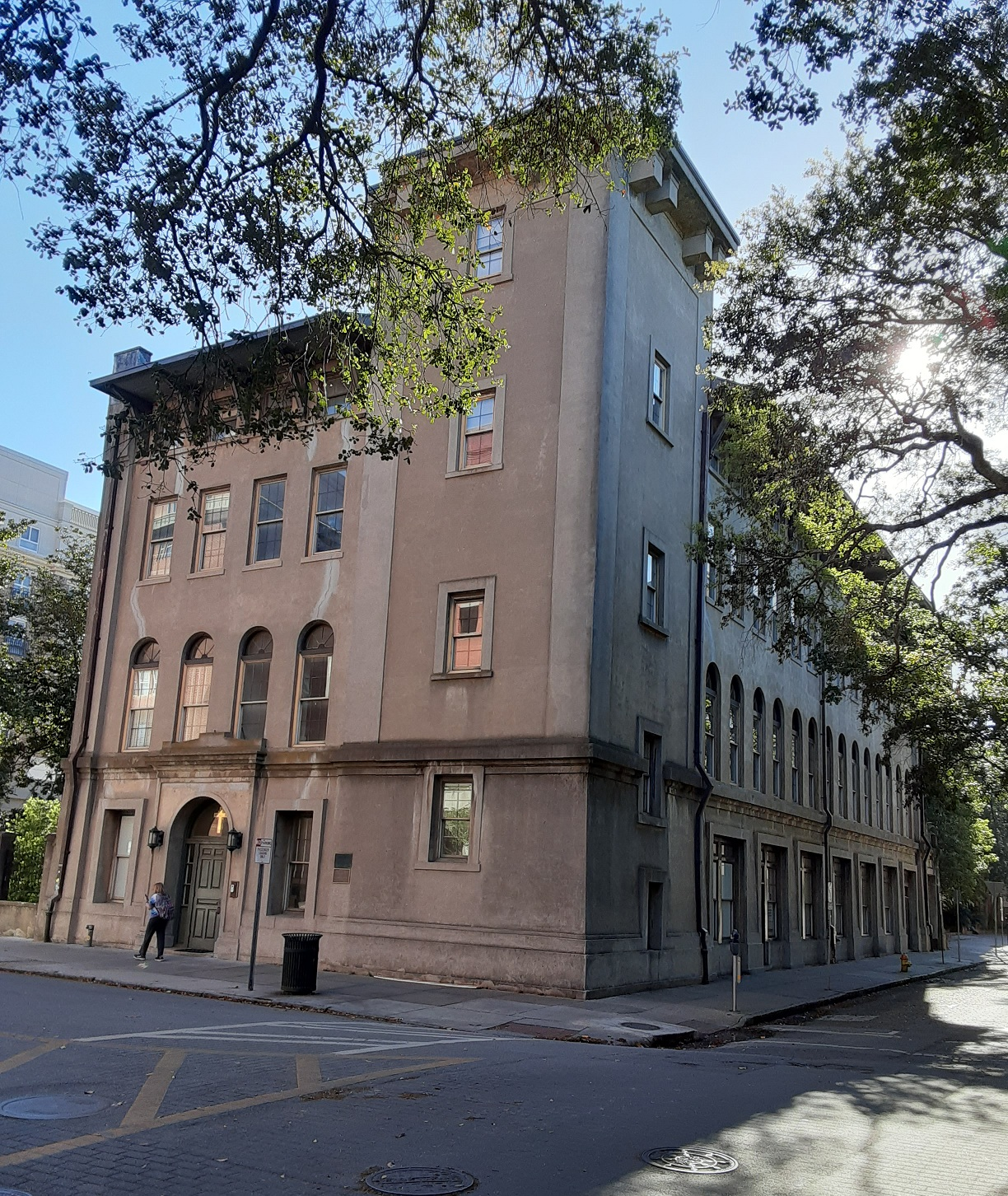
Christ Church parish house, 18 Abercorn Street

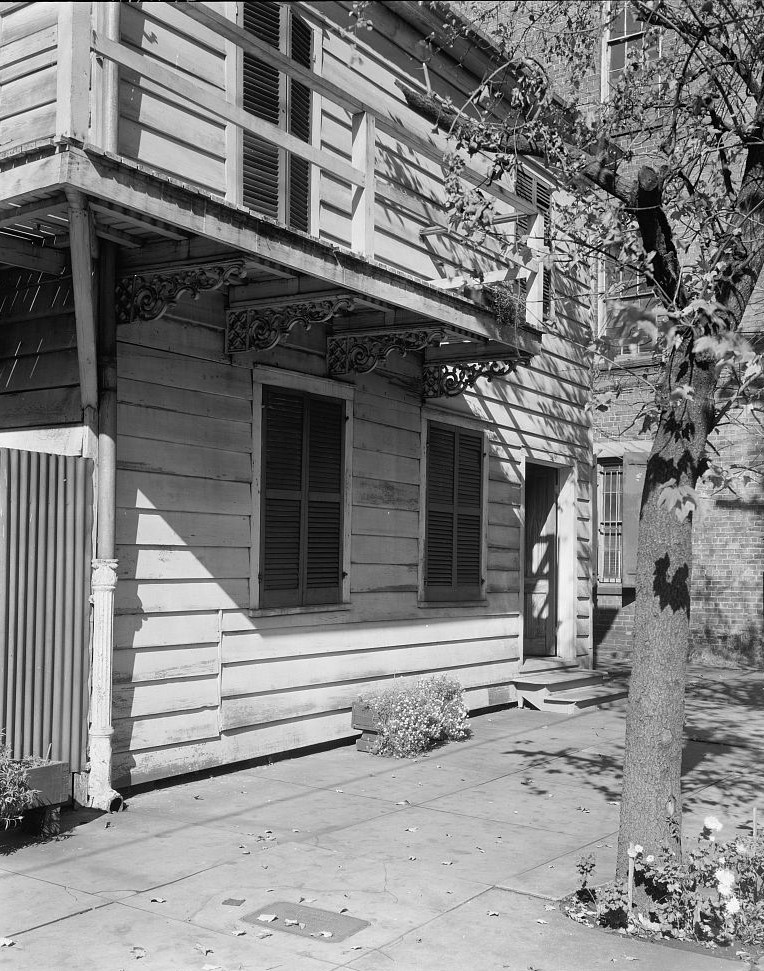
9 Lincoln Street

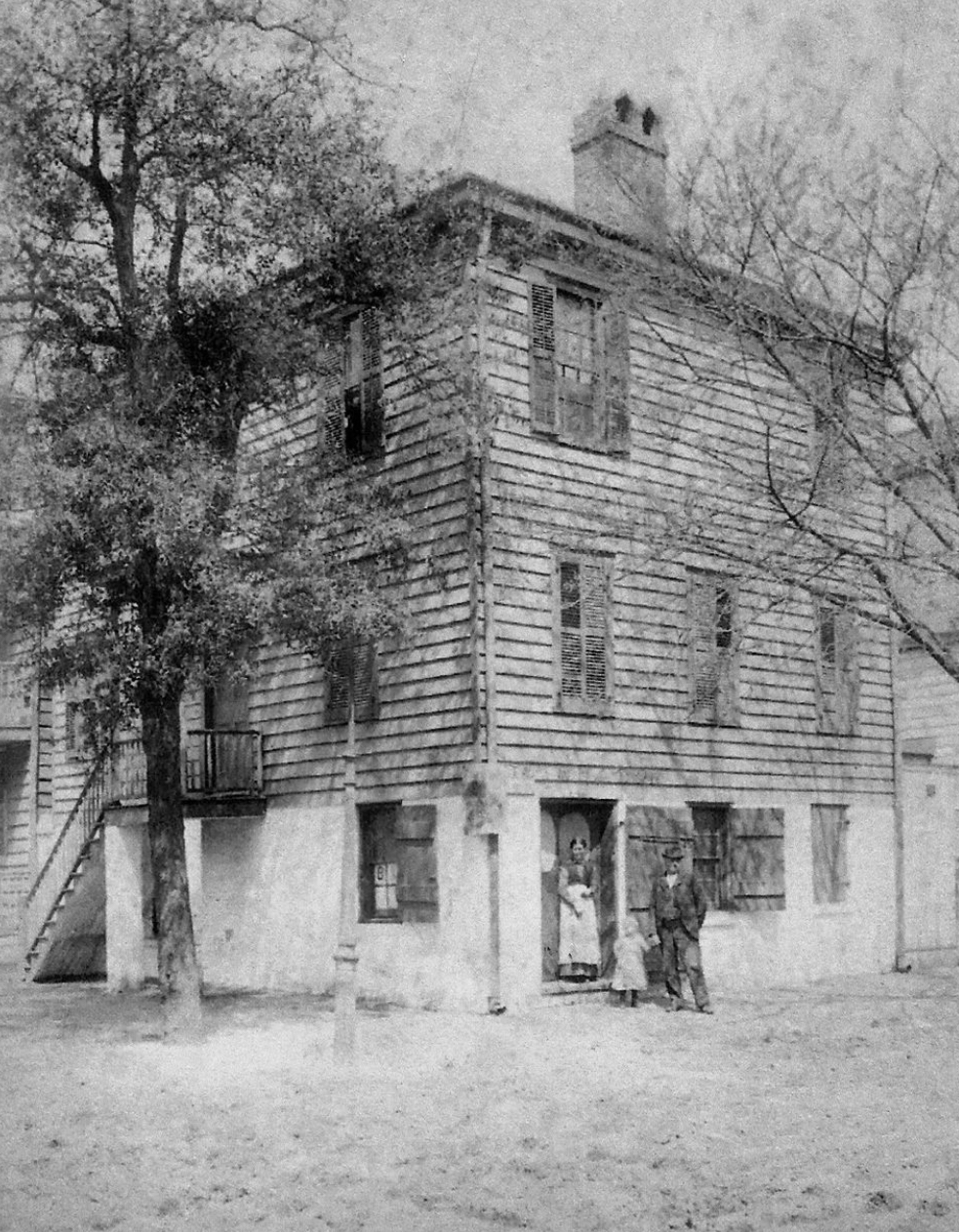
226 East Bryan Street (17 Lincoln Street)

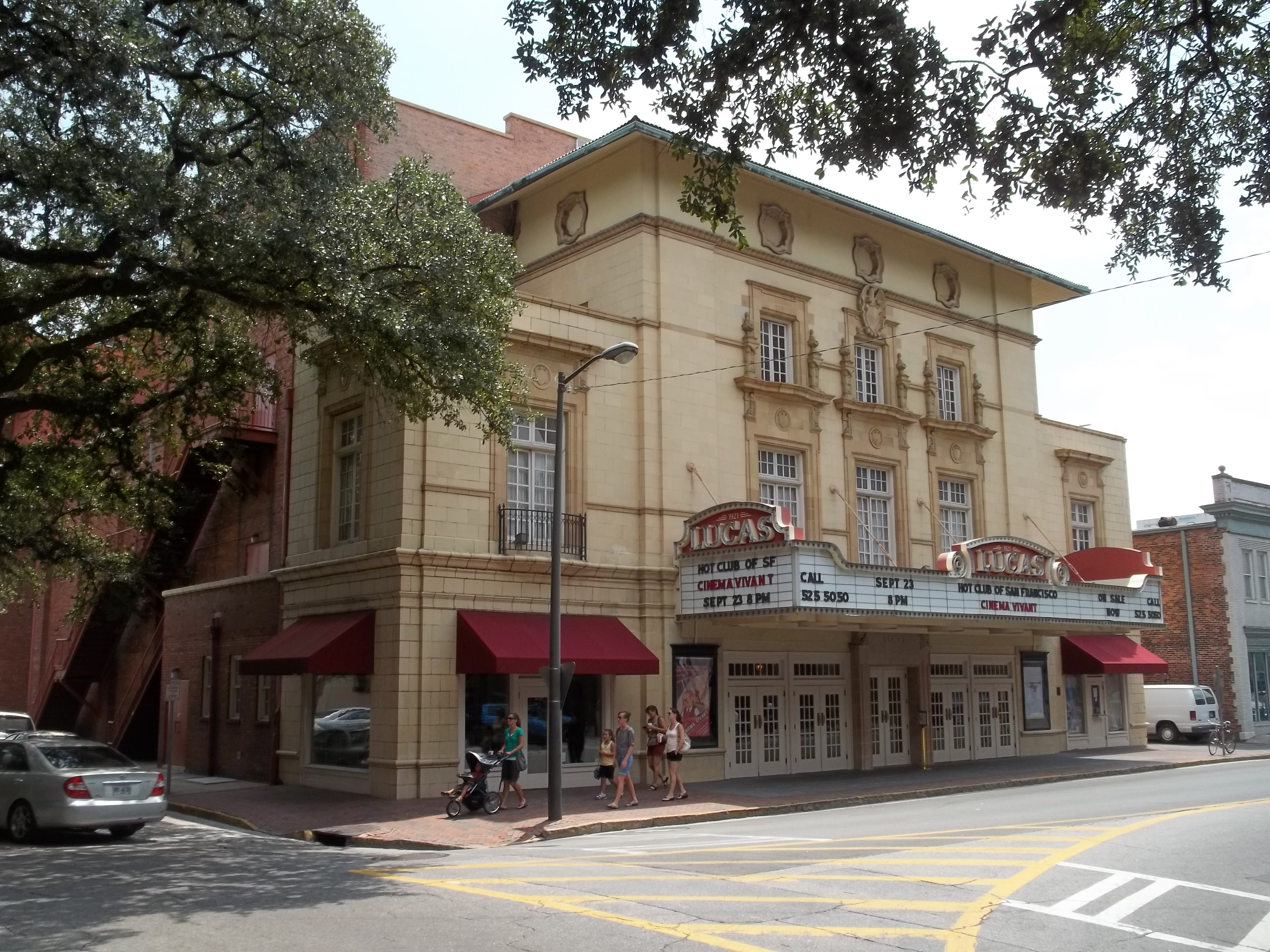
Lucas Theatre, 32 Abercorn Street

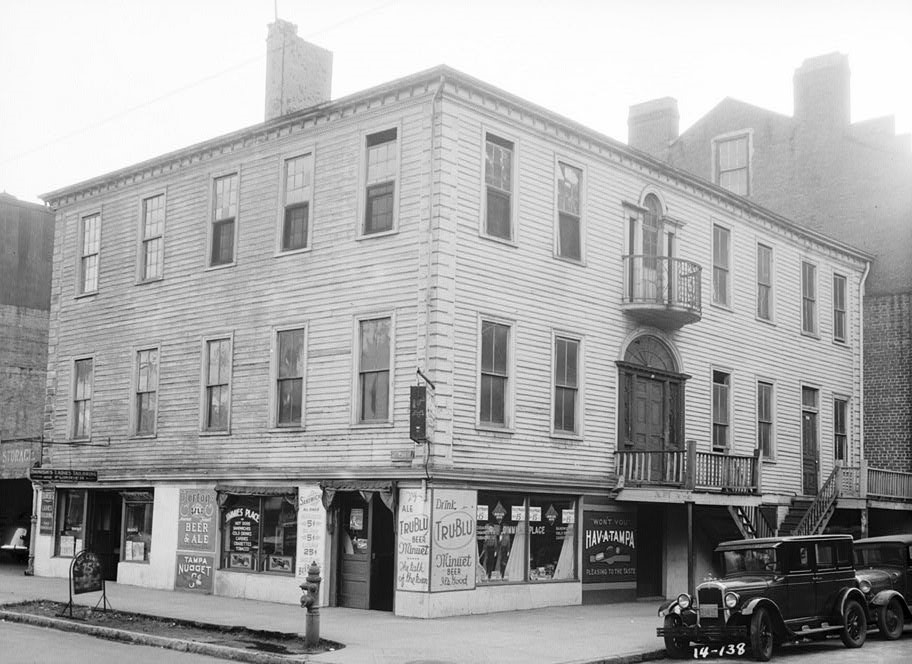
The Hunter–Mackay House, 125 East Congress Street (demolished around 1939)

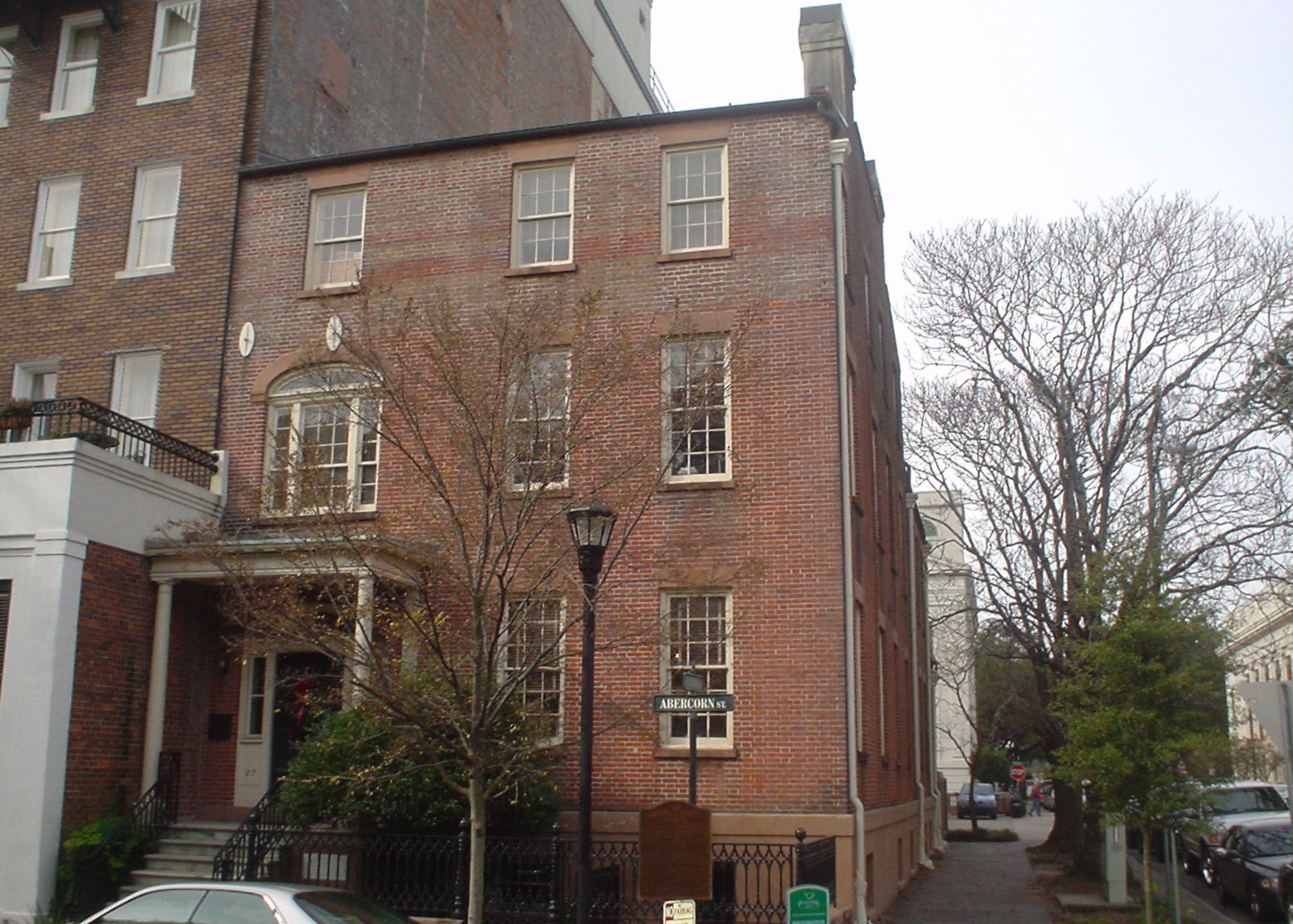
Oliver Sturges House, 27 Abercorn Street

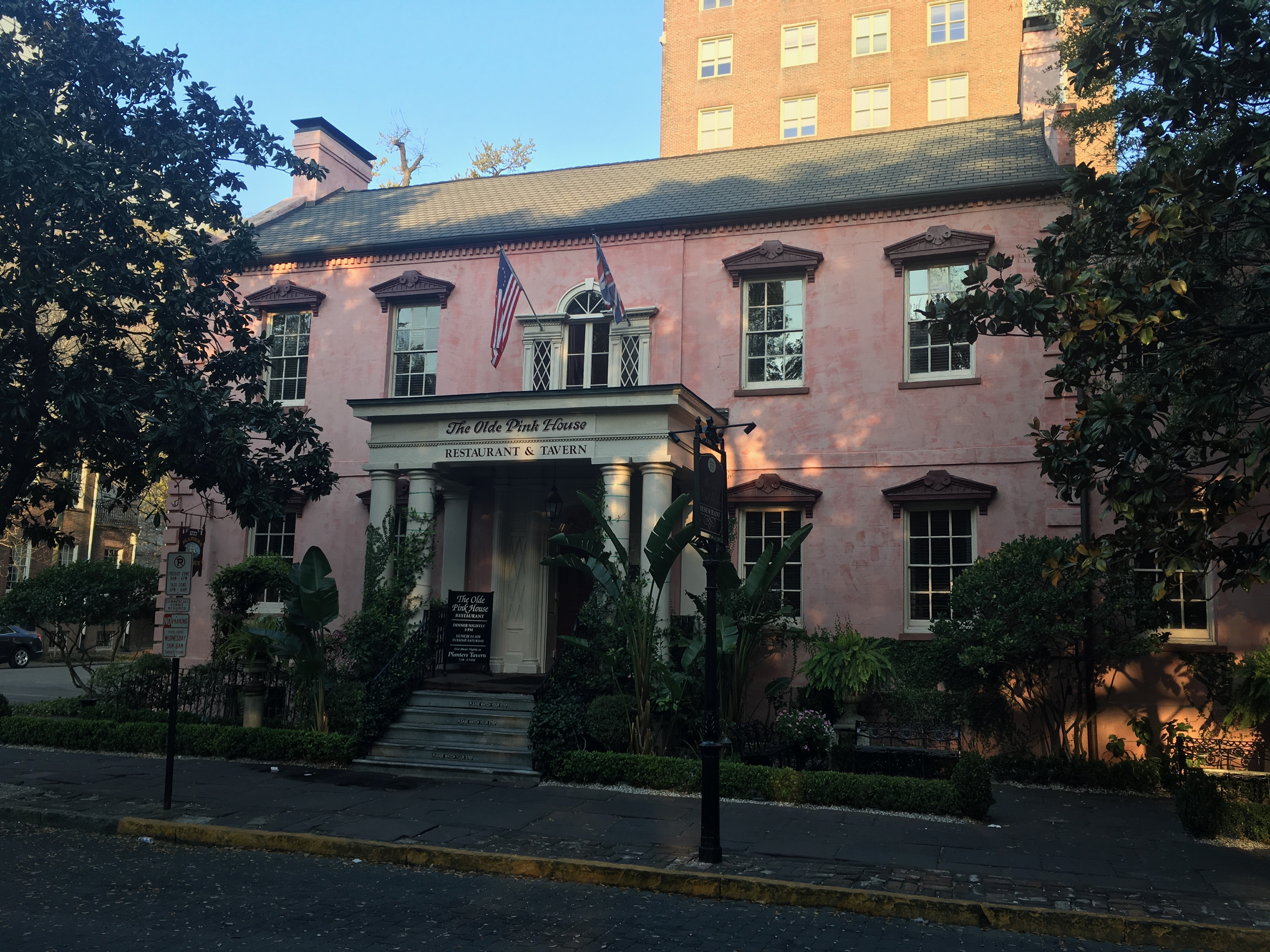
The Olde Pink House, 23 Abercorn Street

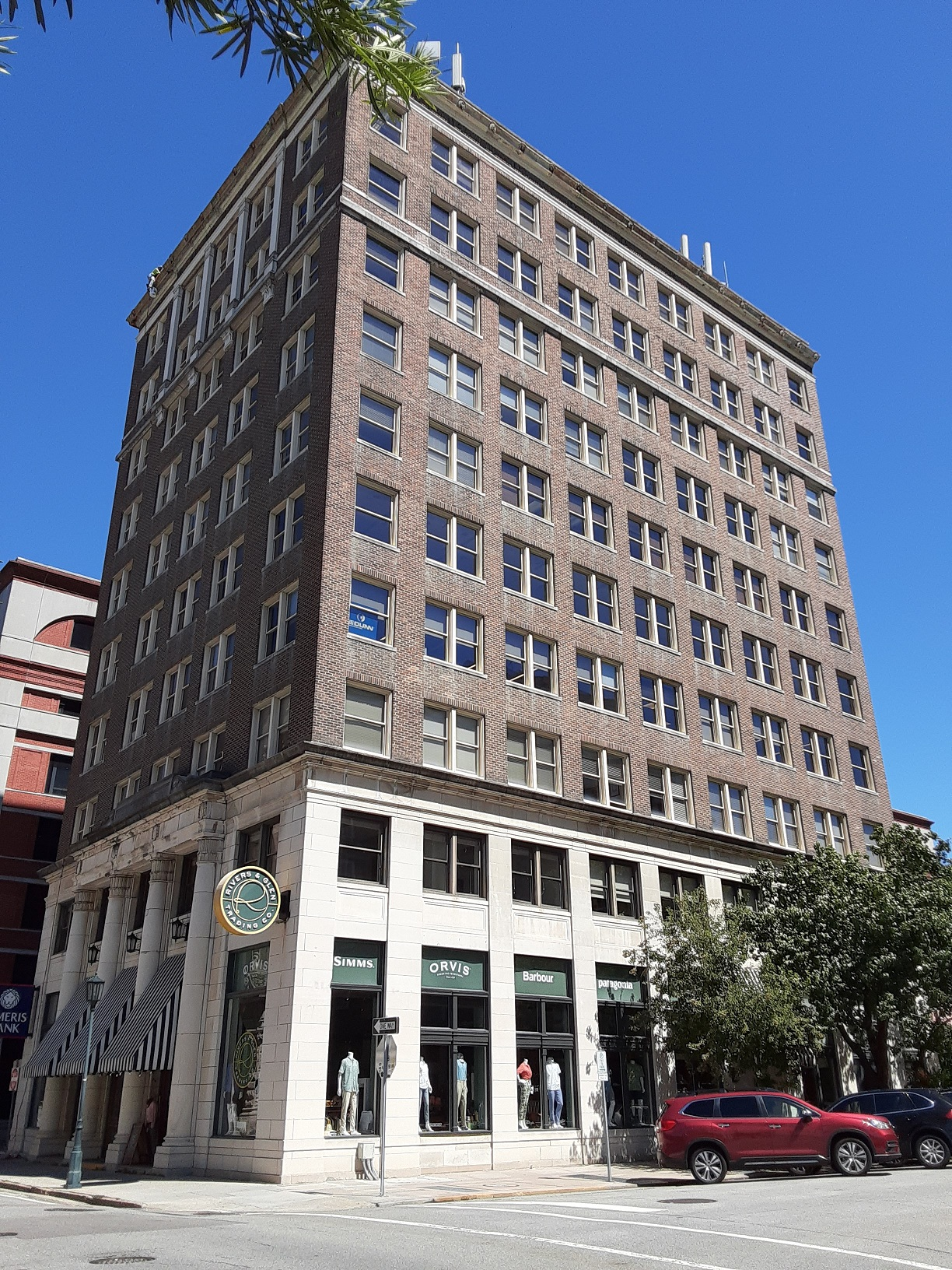
24 Drayton Street
