= Harry Stillwell Edwards =

American novelist

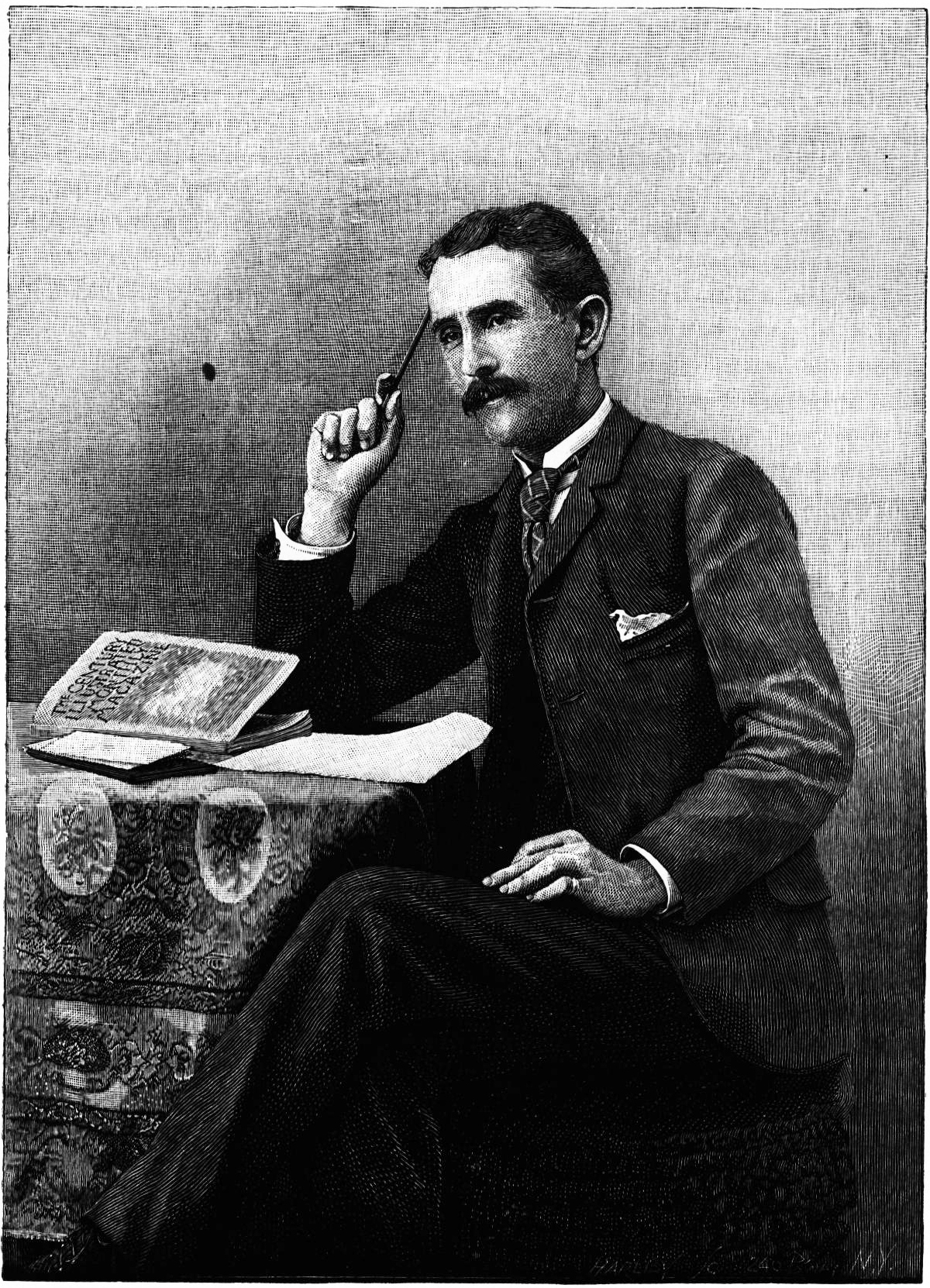
Edwards at a desk, 1891 or before

Harry Stillwell Edwards (April 23, 1855–1938) was an American journalist, novelist, and poet, born at Macon, Georgia. He studied law at Mercer University, Macon, and graduated in 1877. He was assistant editor and editor of Macon journals (1881–1888), gaining distinction as a writer of dialect stories. He wrote on the Georgia aristocracy as well as pro-slavery fantasies popular in the South. Amongst his publications are:

- Two Runaways and Other Stories (1889)
- The Marbeau Cousins (1898)
- Sons and Fathers (1896)
- His Defense and Other Stories (1899)
- Eneas Africanus (1920)
