= Oliver Sturges House =

Historic house in Savannah, Georgia, US

- U.S. National Register of Historic Places
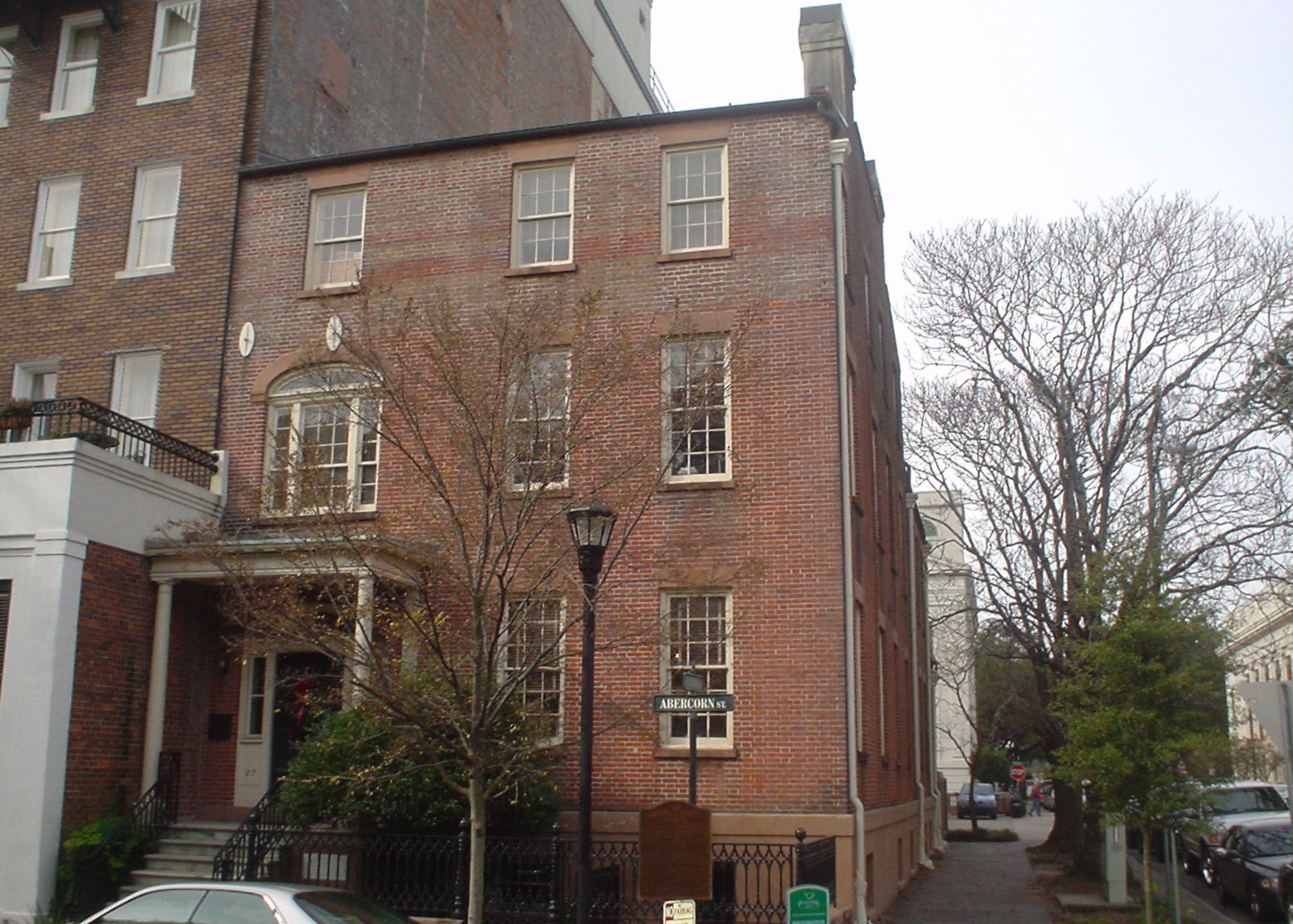
- The building in 2009
- Location: 27 Abercorn Street, Savannah, Georgia
- Coordinates: 32°04′45″N 81°05′24″W
- Built: 1813
- Part of: Savannah Historic District
- NRHP reference No.: 71000271
- Added to NRHP: July 14, 1971

The Oliver Sturges House is a historic building in Savannah, Georgia, United States, built in 1813. It is located in the southwestern trust block of Reynolds Square, and it was placed on the National Register of Historic Places in 1971. The building has also been known as the Hiram Roberts House. Originally owned by Oliver Sturges, Roberts lived here from 1806 to 1880. The house was originally two floors; a third was added in 1835.

The lot the building stands on was the site set aside by the Trustees of the Colony of Georgia for the minister at Savannah. A 1733 map shows an earlier house on the site. In 1736–37, John Wesley, a missionary of the Church of England and later the founder of Methodism, lived there.

The earliest view of the building is depicted by Firmin Cerveau, detail painter and watercolorist, in 1837. The painting now hangs in the Georgia Historical Society's offices.

In 1964, the Historic Savannah Foundation saved the building from demolition.

The property sits directly across East Saint Julian Street from The Olde Pink House, which was constructed 24 years earlier. It has been the home of Morris Multimedia since 1971.

== Gallery ==
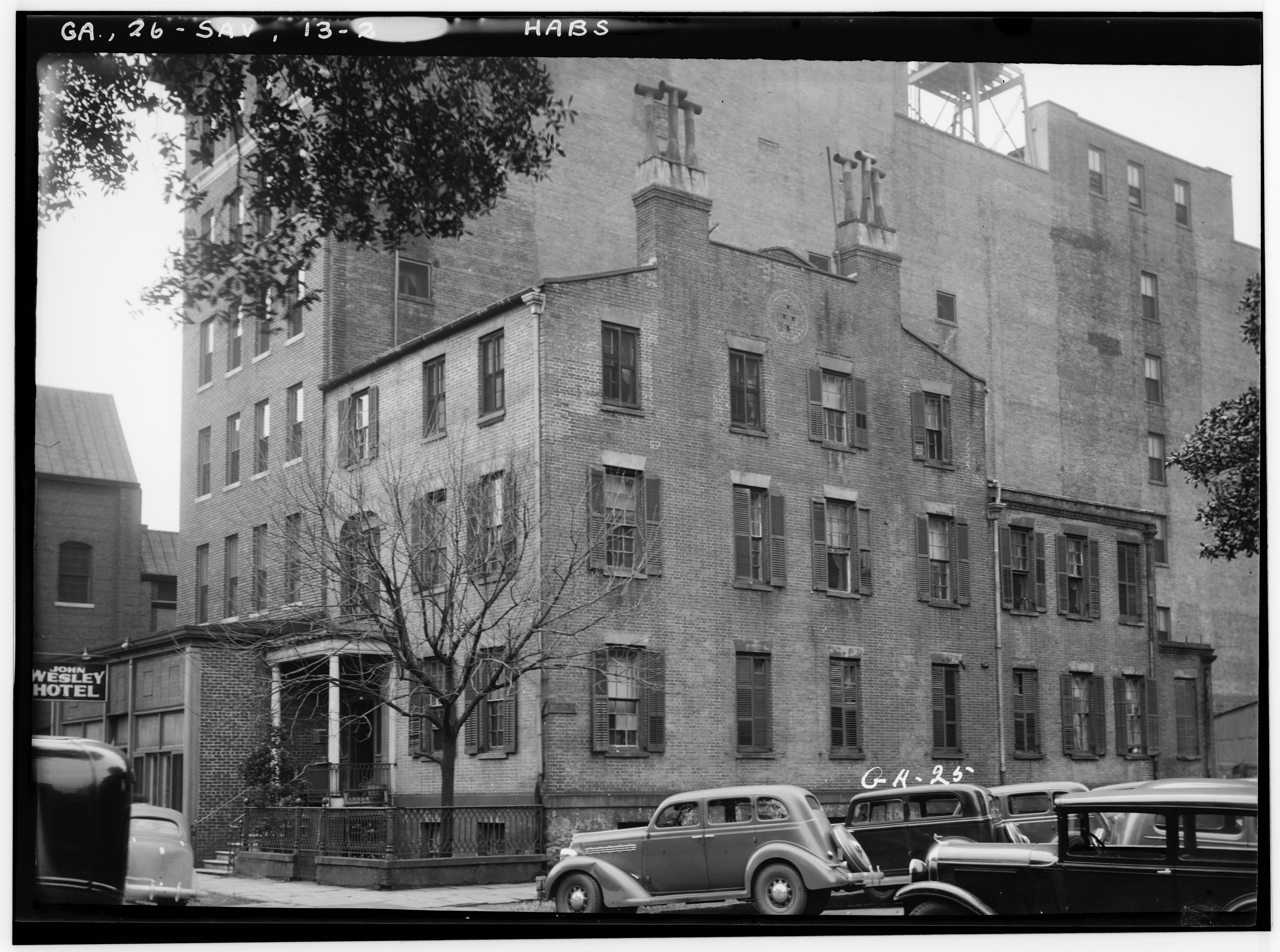
A view of its northern side. Note the John Wesley Hotel was in business at 29 Abercorn Street

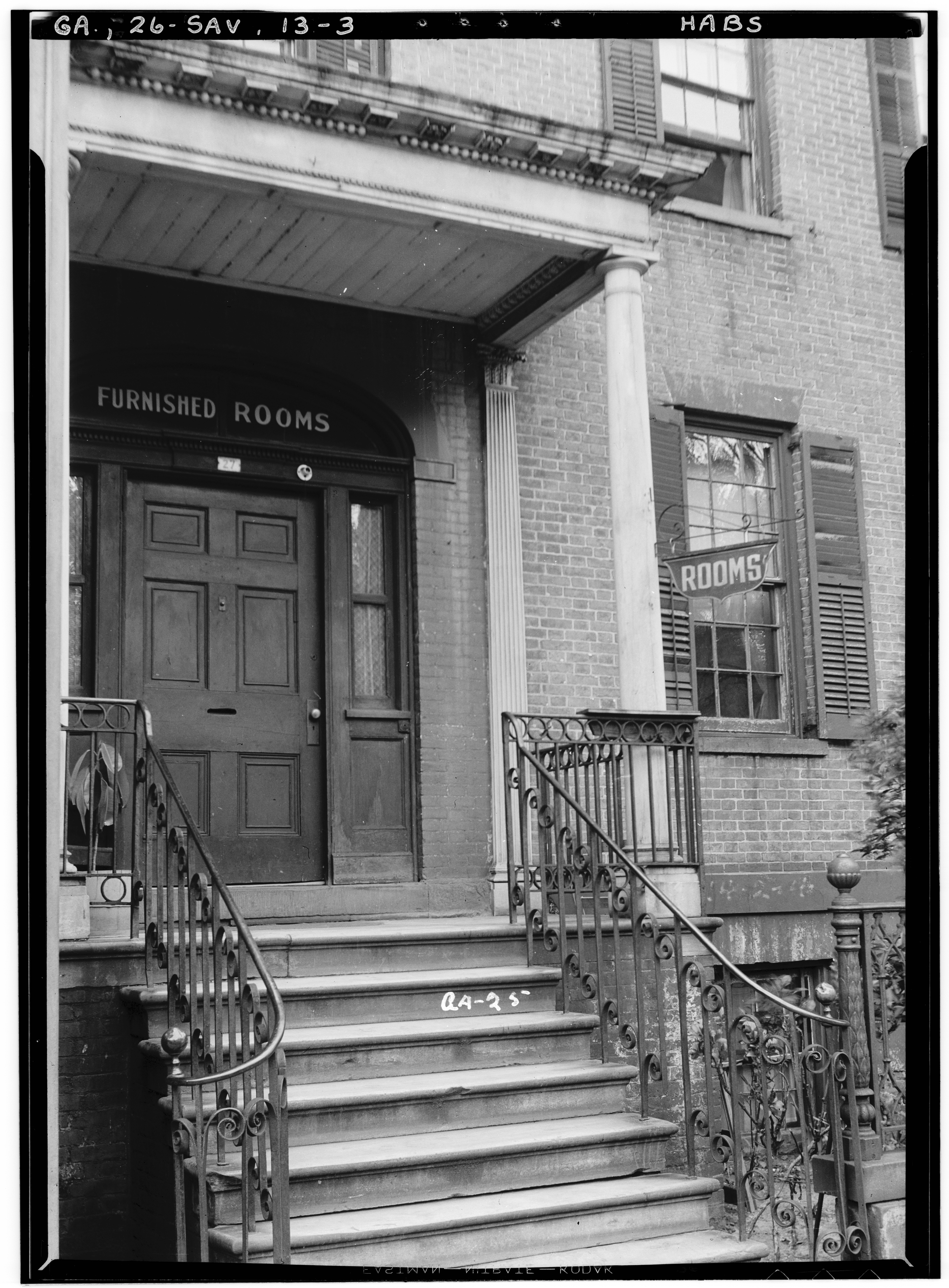
Front entrance detail, 1930s

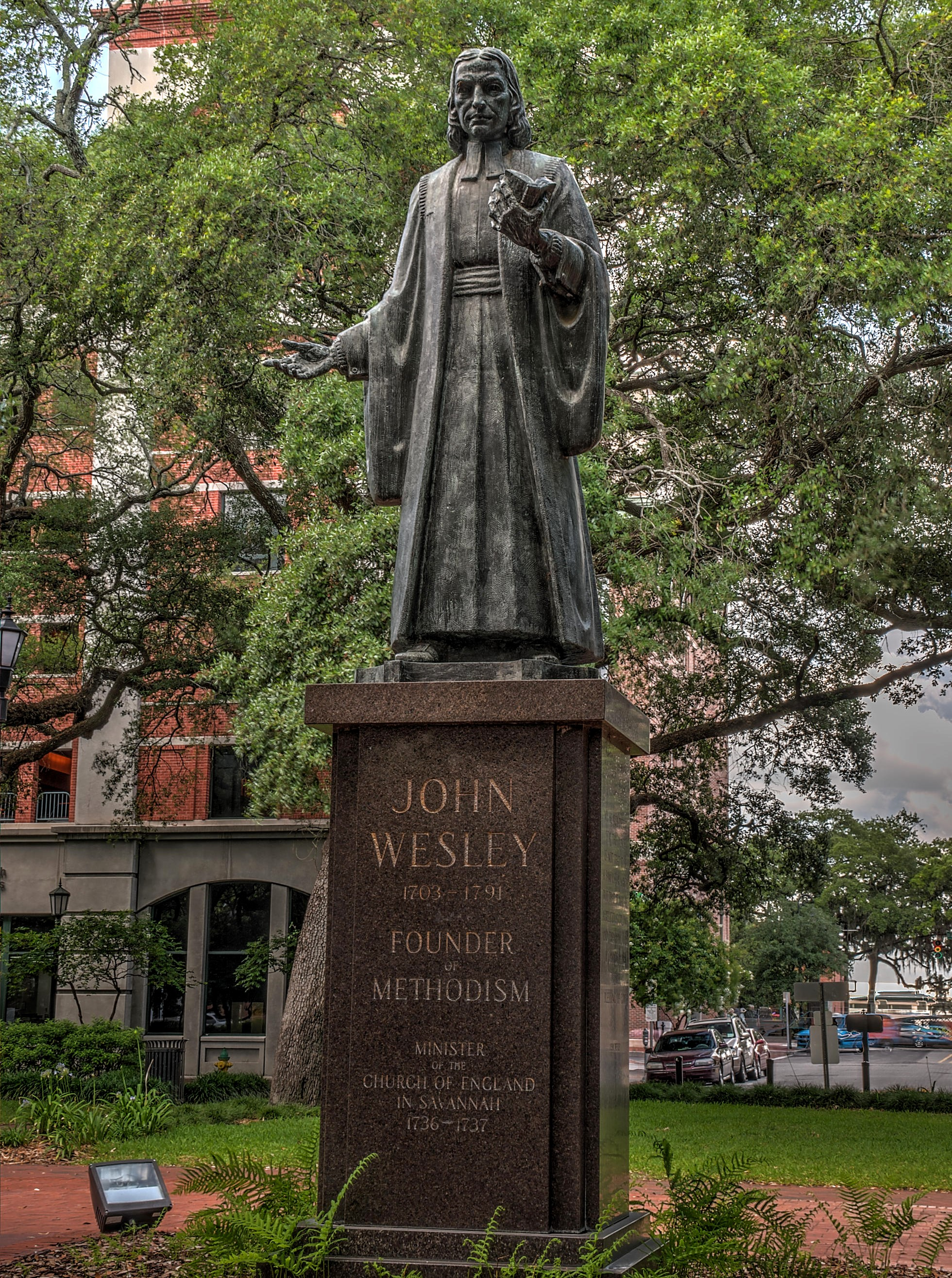
Statue of John Wesley in Reynolds Square

== See also ==
- Buildings in Savannah Historic District
- List of historic houses and buildings in Savannah, Georgia
