= The Olde Pink House =

Restaurant and tavern in Savannah, Georgia, United States

- The Pink House

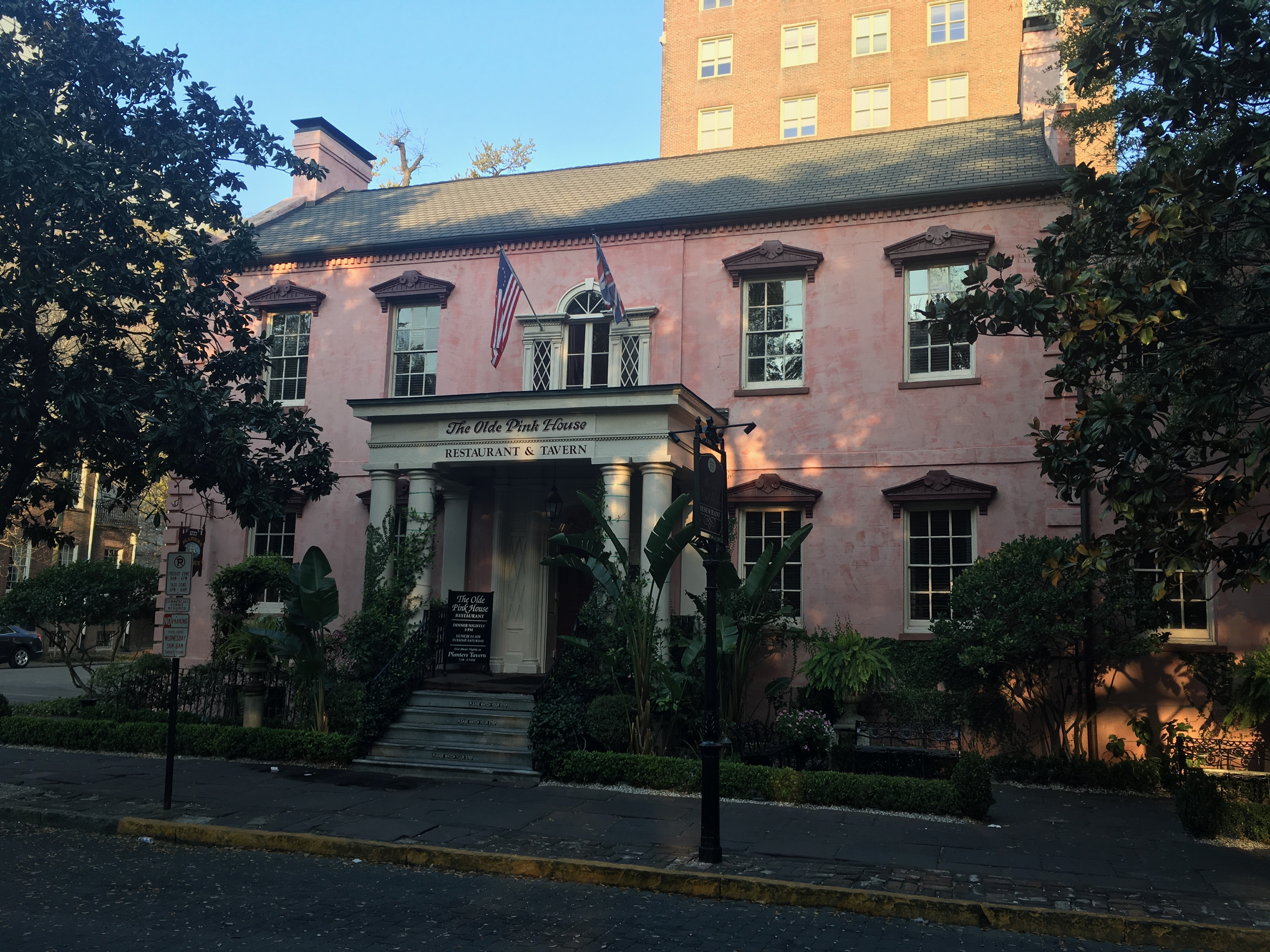
- The Olde Pink House in 2017
- Interactive map of the The Olde Pink House area
- Former names: Habersham House

General information
- Architectural style: Georgian
- Location: Reynolds Square, Savannah, Georgia, United States, 23 Abercorn Street
- Coordinates: 32.07967°N 81.08984°W
- Construction started: 1771
- Completed: 1789 (237 years ago)
- Owner: Donna Moeckel

Technical details
- Floor count: 3
- Floor area: ~16,000 sq. ft

Design and construction
- Architects: Joseph Clay (original); Mark P. Finlay Architects (2006 expansion)

The Olde Pink House (also known as The Pink House and, formerly, Habersham House) is a restaurant and tavern in Savannah, Georgia, United States. Located on Abercorn Street, in the northwestern trust lot of Reynolds Square, the building dates from 1771. It is bounded by East Bryan Street to the north, Abercorn Street to the east and East Saint Julian Street to the south.

One of its key features is a Palladian window above the portico.

The property sits directly across East Saint Julian Street from the Oliver Sturges House, which was constructed 24 years later.

== History ==
=== 18th century ===
The building, completed in 1789, was originally known as Habersham House, after its owner James Habersham Jr., one of Savannah's most important early cotton factors and founding-family members. Habersham lived there until his death in 1799. The lot was originally a land grant from the British Crown. It survived the Savannah fire of 1796 that destroyed 229 buildings in the city.

=== 19th century ===
In 1812, the home became Planters Bank, the first bank in Georgia. It was at this time that a portico, supported by unfluted Doric columns, was added to the building's main façade, while an extension was built on the northern side.

=== 20th century ===
After the Civil War, the house changed hands several times, becoming the architectural practice of Henrik Wallin, an attorney's office, a bookstore, and between 1930 and 1943, Alida Harper Fowlkes' Georgian Tea Room.

In 1968, the building was bought and restored by Jim Williams, owner of Mercer House.

In 1970, Herschel McCallar Jr. and his partner Jeffrey Keith bought the building for around $60,000 (equivalent to $497,400 in 2025). They undertook a one-year restoration, which included jacking up the building and upgrading the foundation by installing I beams and setting it back down. When they did this all the doorways and mouldings went back into place as if it were new. They also discovered the twin fireplaces in the basement that had been covered over at some point in the nineteenth century. These fireplaces were the original cooking kitchen in the 18th century, and are now the highlight of the bar. They also removed the Victorian staircase and lowered the original 18th-century section of stairs to the first floor. This is what you see when you enter the building today. They also installed the staircase into the tavern so one did not have to go outside. All new plumbing and electrical, and a new kitchen were also added at the time. Keith also opened an antique store on the second floor. They made several buying trips to England to purchase the many 18th-century antiques, and paintings seen in the restaurant today. They opened the restaurant in 1971.

Keith sold the building to William and Elizabeth Balish in 1992, two years after the death of McCallar. The Balishes retained McCallar and Keith's restoration, and maintained the grandeur they did in the restoration. Donna Moeckel, the daughter of the Balishes, is the current owner.

=== 21st century ===
In 2006, Arches Bar, on the southern side of the building, was added during an expansion project. There is also a cellar tavern, Planters Tavern, which features a single-table wine vault for special occasions. There are thirteen dining rooms in total.

In December 2018, a fire broke out in the upstairs ballroom, causing damage that resulted in the building closing for four months.

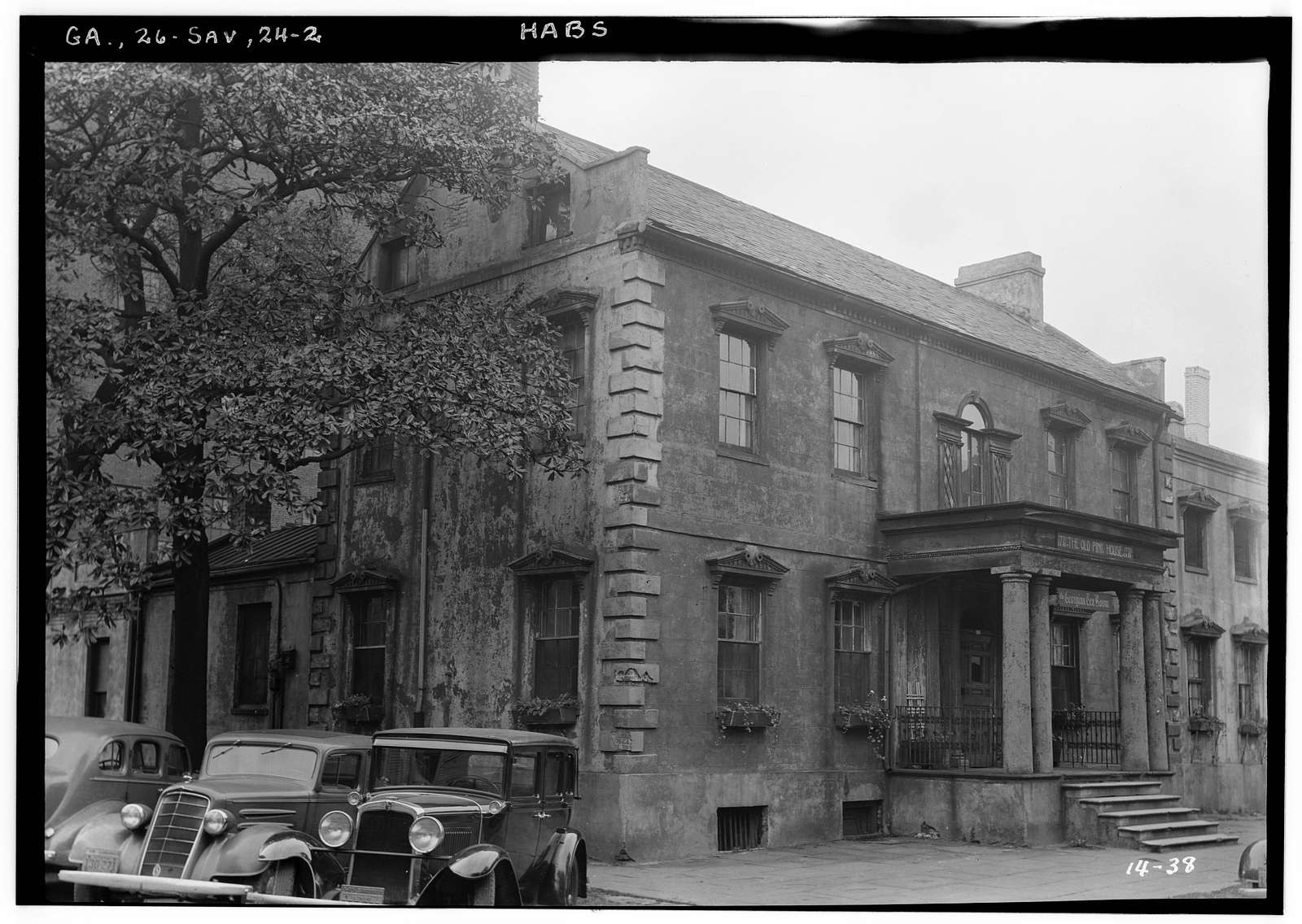
Southeast corner

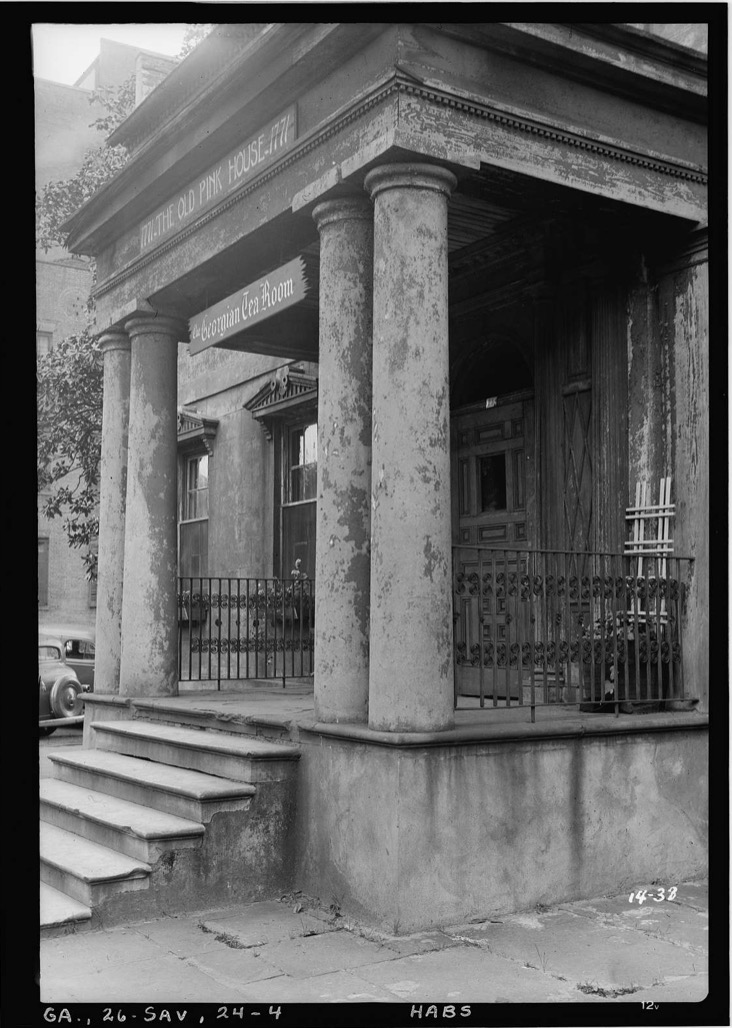
A close-up of the portico

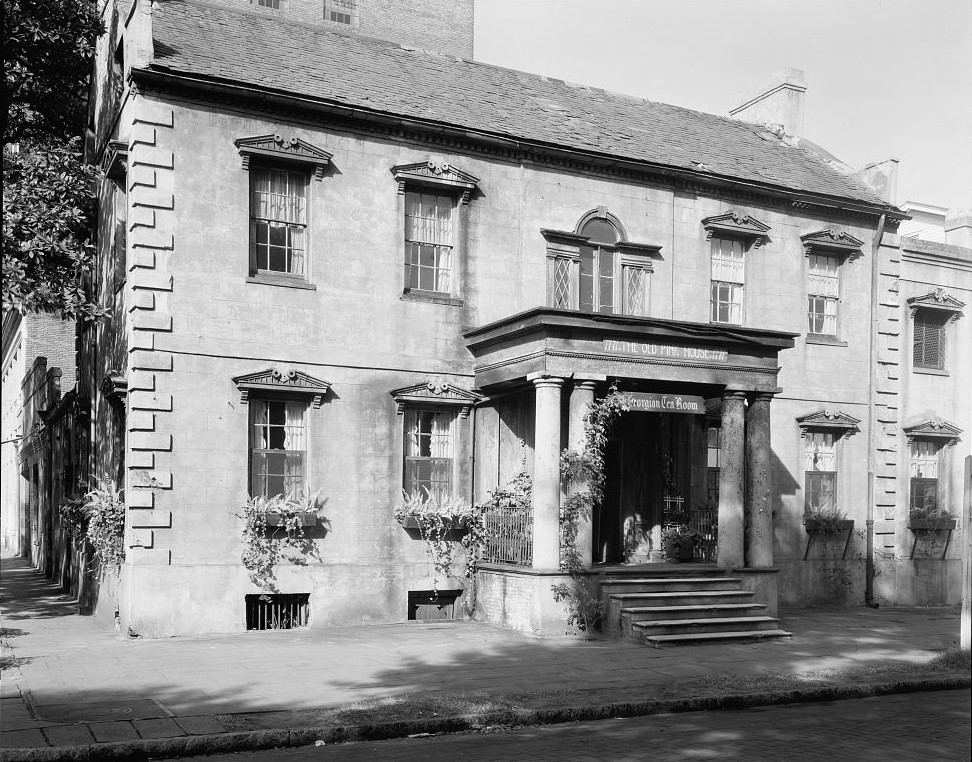
The building when it was Alida Harper Fowlkes' Georgian Tea Room during the 1930s and '40s. The portico and the section just visible to the right were added around 1820. Photographed by Frances Benjamin Johnston

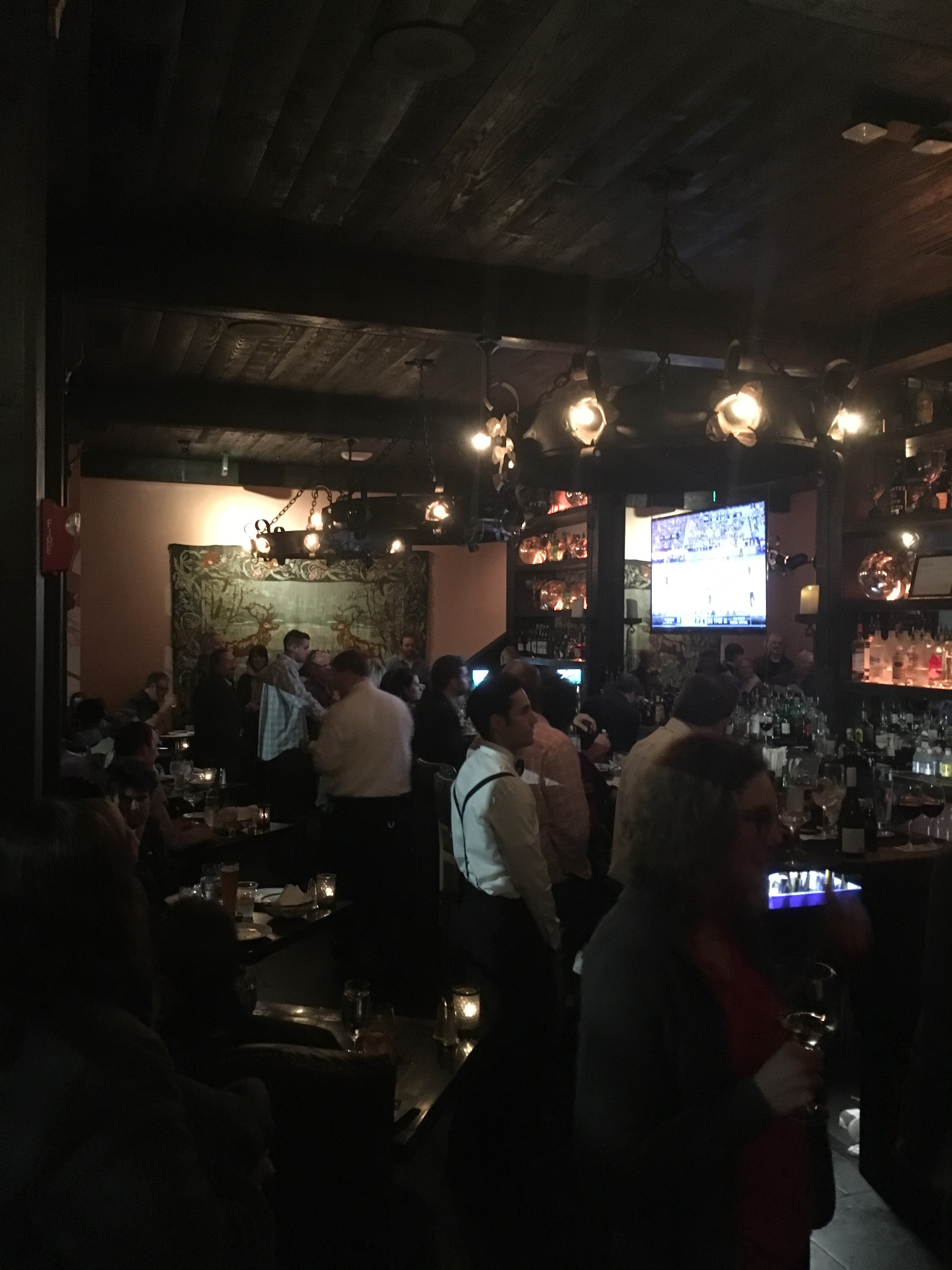
Arches Bar, located on the first floor on the building's southern side, was part of an expansion completed in 2008

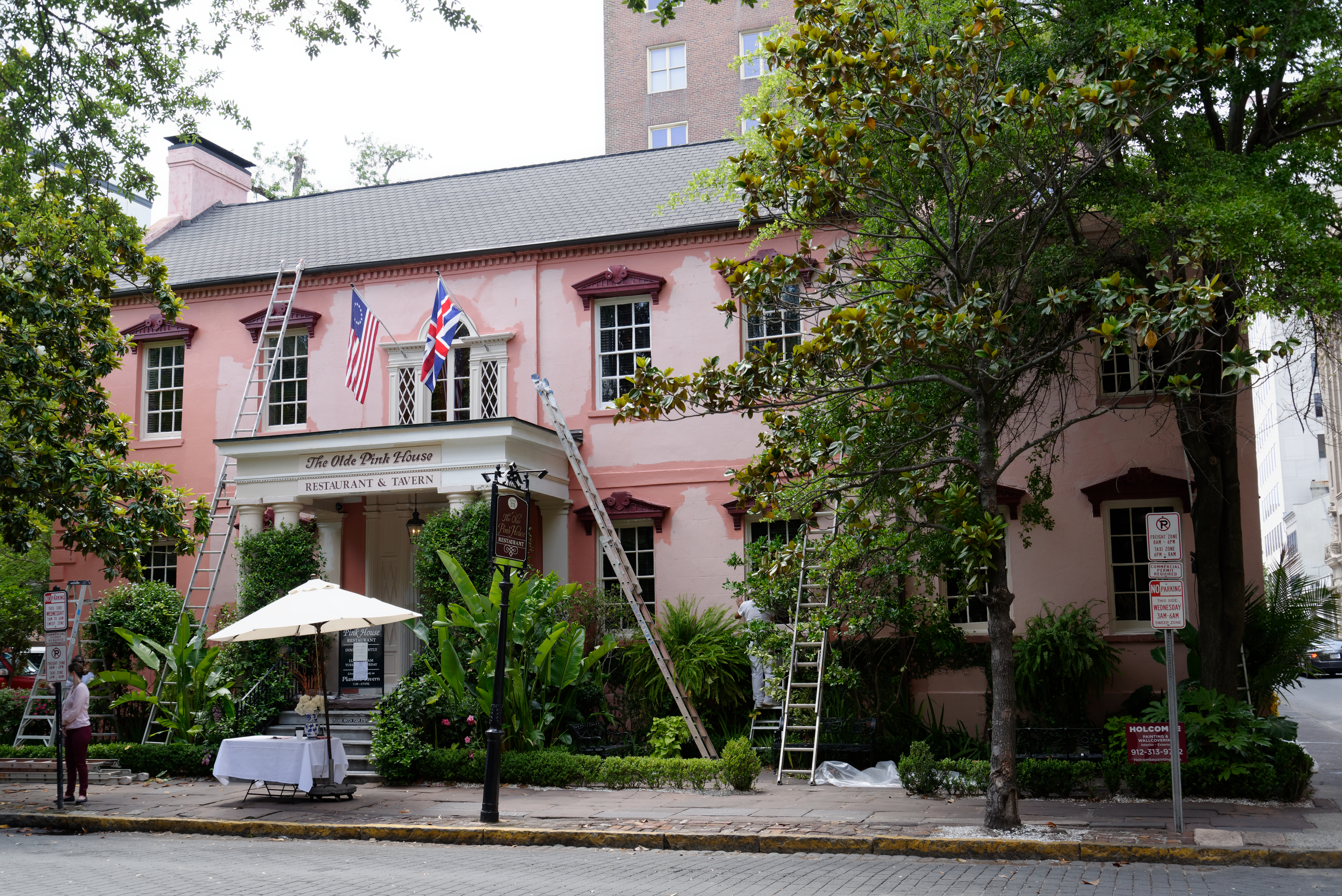
Being repainted in 2020

== Copy ==
An almost-identical house was built in 1928 at 102 East Gaston Street, just beyond the northeastern corner of Forsyth Park.

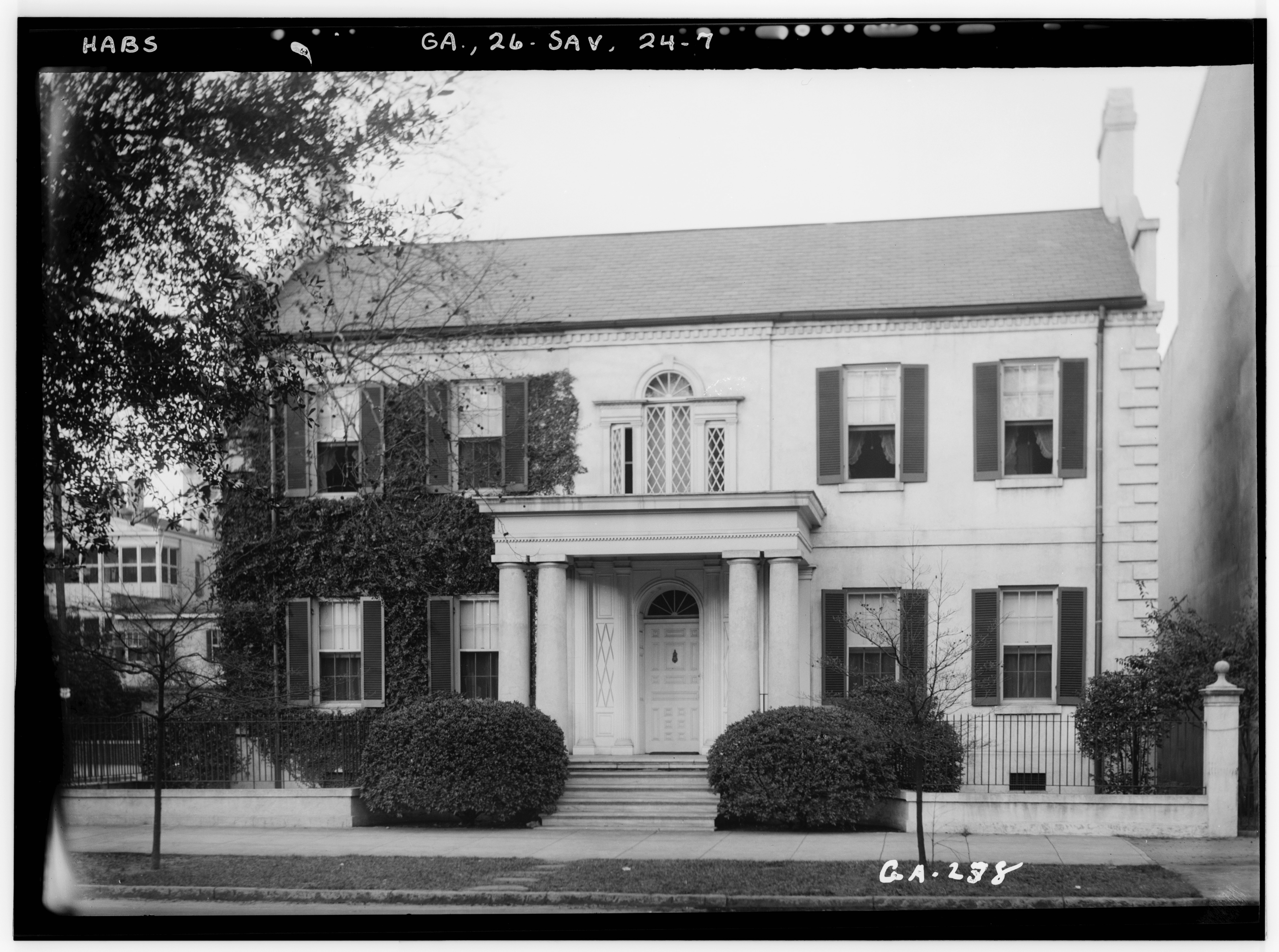
102 East Gaston Street, sometime after 1928

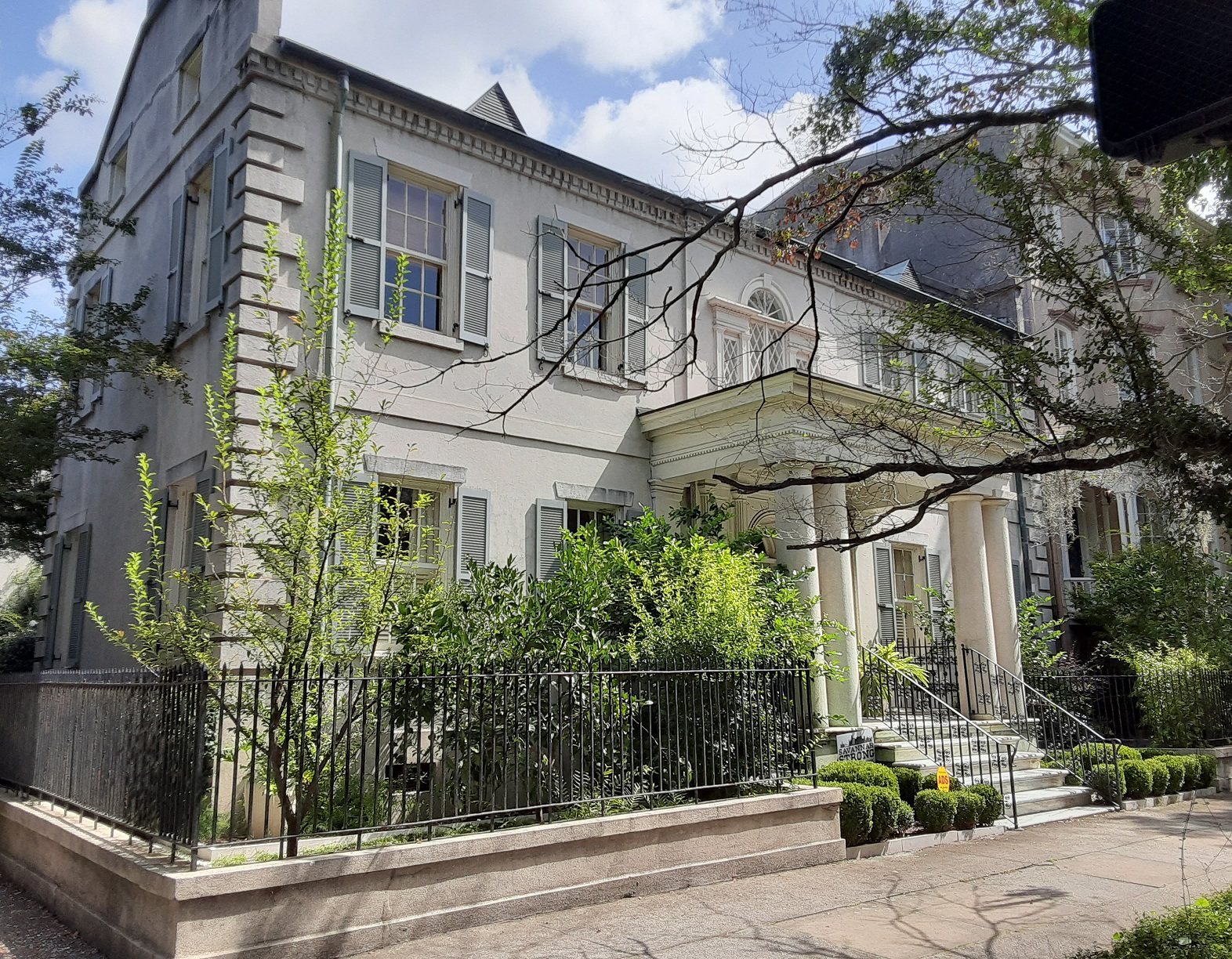
The house in 2021
