= Squares of Savannah, Georgia =

Aspect of street grid in Georgia, US

The city of Savannah, Province of Georgia, was laid out in 1733, in what was colonial America, around four open squares, each surrounded by four residential ("tithing") blocks and four civic ("trust") blocks. The layout of a square and eight surrounding blocks was known as a "ward." The original plan (now known as the Oglethorpe Plan) was part of a larger regional plan that included gardens, farms, and "outlying villages." Once the four wards were developed in the mid-1730s, two additional wards were laid. Oglethorpe's agrarian balance was abandoned after the Georgia Trustee period.

The first four squares created were Johnson, Percival (now named Wright Square), Decker (now named Ellis Square) and St. James (now named Telfair Square). Additional squares were added during the late 18th and 19th centuries, and by 1851 there were 24 squares in the city. In the 20th century, three of the squares―Elbert, Ellis and Liberty―were demolished or altered beyond recognition for road works, leaving 21. In 2010, Ellis Square was reclaimed, bringing the total to today's 22.

Most of Savannah's squares are named in honor or in memory of a person, persons or historical event; many contain monuments, markers, memorials, statues, plaques, and other tributes. The statues and monuments were placed in the squares partly to protect the squares from demolition.

Today, the area is part of a large urban preservation district known as the Savannah Historic District.

== Overview ==
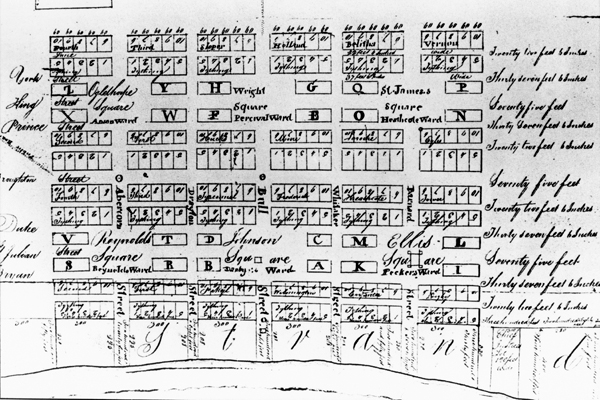
1770 plan of Savannah showing the first six squares. The Savannah River and "north" are to the bottom of the image. In addition to the first four squares—Johnson, Wright, St. James (Telfair) and Ellis—this map also shows the later-constructed Reynolds and Oglethorpe Squares.

The city of Savannah was founded in 1733 by General James Oglethorpe. Although cherished by many today for their aesthetic beauty, the first squares were originally intended to provide colonists space for practical reasons such as militia training exercises. The original plan resembles the layout of contemporary military camps, which were likely quite familiar to General Oglethorpe. The layout was also a reaction against the cramped conditions that fueled the Great Fire of London in 1666. A square was established for each ward of the new city. The first four squares were named Johnson, Percival (now Wright), Decker (now Ellis) and St. James (now Telfair), and they formed a larger square on the bluff overlooking the Savannah River. The original plan actually called for six squares, and as the city grew the grid of wards and squares was extended so that 33 squares were eventually created on a five-by-two-hundred grid. (Two points on this grid were occupied by Colonial Park Cemetery, established in 1750, and four others—in the southern corners of the downtown area—were never developed with squares.) When the city began to expand south of Gaston Street, the grid of squares was abandoned and Forsyth Park was allowed to serve as a single, centralized park for that area.

All of the squares measure approximately 200 feet (61 m) from east to west, but they vary north to south from approximately 100 to 300 feet (91 m). Typically, each square is intersected north-south and east-west by wide, two-way streets. They are bounded to the west and east by the south- and north-bound lanes of the intersecting north-south street, and to the north and south by smaller one-way streets running east-to-west and west-to-east, respectively. As a result, traffic flows one way—counterclockwise—around the squares, which thus function much like traffic circles.

Layout of a typical ward in Oglethorpe's plan

Each square sits (or, in some cases, sat) at the center of a ward, which often shares its name with its square. The lots to the east and west of the squares, flanking the major east-west axis, were considered "trust lots" in the original city plan and intended for large public buildings such as churches, schools, or markets. The remainder of the ward was divided into four areas, called tithings, each of which was further divided into ten residential lots. This arrangement is illustrated in the 1770 Plan of Savannah, reproduced here, and remains readily visible in the modern aerial photograph above. The distinction between trust lot and residential lot has always been fluid. Some grand homes, such as the well-known Mercer House, stand on trust lots, while many of the residential lots have long hosted commercial properties.

All of the squares are a part of the Savannah Historic District and fall within an area of less than 0.5 square miles (1.3 km^{2}). The five squares along Bull Street—Monterey, Madison, Chippewa, Wright, and Johnson—were intended to be grand monument spaces and have been called Savannah's "Crown Jewels." Many of the other squares were designed more simply as commons or parks, although most serve as memorials as well.

Architect John Massengale has called Savannah's city plan "the most intelligent grid in America, perhaps the world", and Edmund Bacon wrote that "it remains as one of the finest diagrams for city organization and growth in existence." The American Society of Civil Engineers has honored Oglethorpe's plan for Savannah as a National Historic Civil Engineering Landmark, and in 1994 the plan was nominated for inclusion in the UNESCO World Heritage List. The squares are a major point of interest for millions of tourists visiting Savannah each year, and they have been credited with stabilizing once-deteriorating neighborhoods and revitalizing Savannah's downtown commercial district.

== First four squares, 1733 ==
The first four squares were laid out by James Oglethorpe in 1733, the same year in which he founded the Georgia colony and the city of Savannah.

=== Johnson Square ===
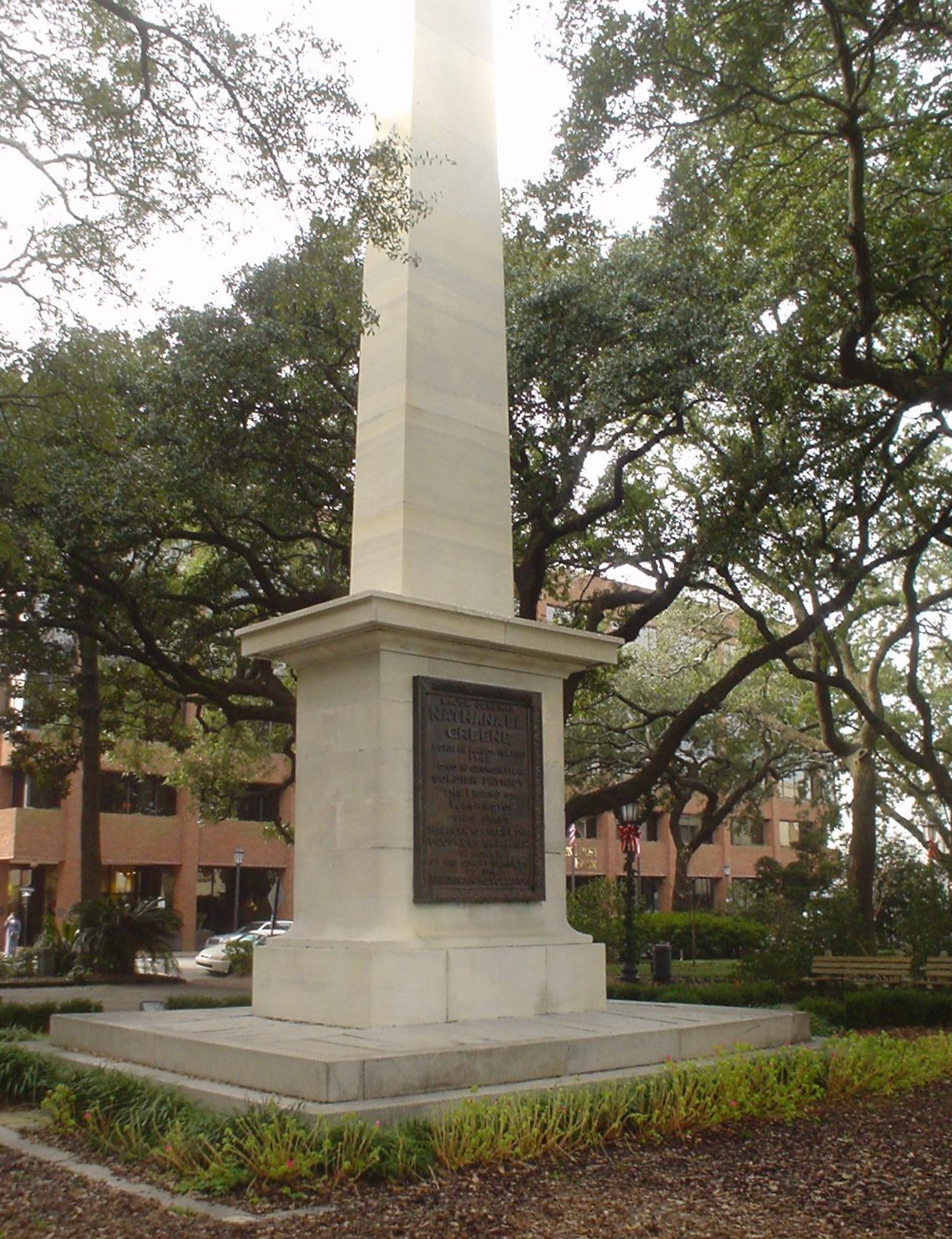
Nathanael Greene Monument in Johnson Square

Johnson Square was the first of Savannah's squares, and remains the largest of the 22. It was named for Robert Johnson, colonial governor of South Carolina and a friend of General Oglethorpe. Interred under the Nathanael Greene Monument in the square is Revolutionary War hero General Nathanael Greene, the namesake of nearby Greene Square.

Johnson Square contains two fountains, as well as a sundial dedicated to Colonel William Bull, the namesake of Savannah's Bull Street.

Another landmark of Johnson Square is the Johnson Square Business Center. This building, formerly known as the Savannah Bank Building, was the city's first "skyscraper", built in 1911. Johnson Square is known as the financial district, or banking square, and many of the city's financial services companies are located here. These companies include the Savannah Bancorp, Savannah Bank, Coastal Bank Headquarters, Bank of America branch, SunTrust branch, United Community Bank branch, TitleMax Corporate Headquarters, and a Regions Bank building.

Johnson Square is also home to Christ Church, "the Mother Church of Georgia", established in 1733. Early clergy of the church include John Wesley and George Whitefield.

=== Wright Square ===
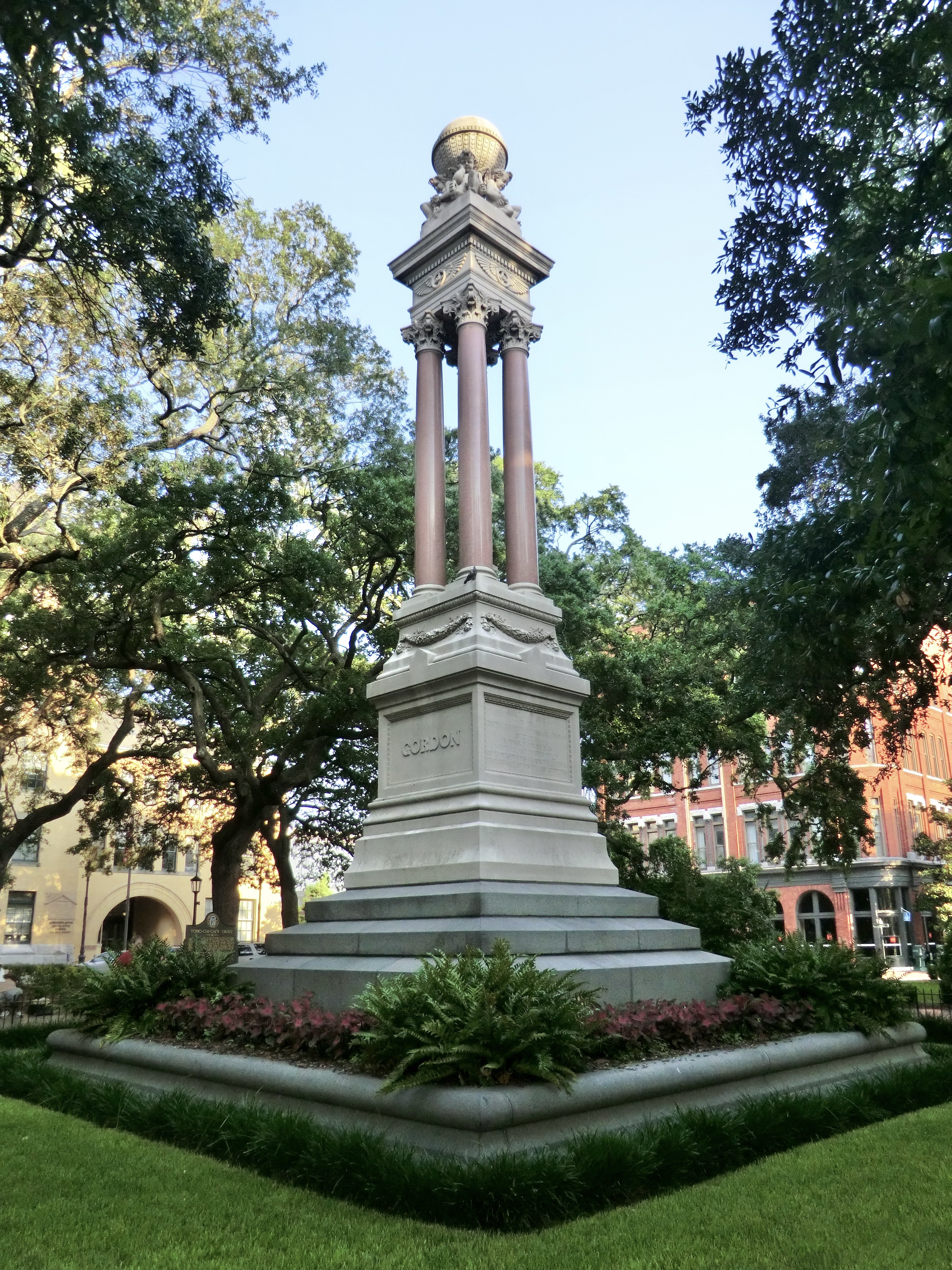
William Washington Gordon Monument in Wright Square

The second square established in Savannah, Perceval Square was named for John Perceval, 1st Earl of Egmont, generally regarded as the man who gave the colony of Georgia its name (a tribute to Great Britain's King George II). It was renamed in 1763 to honor James Wright, the third and final royal governor of Georgia. Throughout its history it has also been known as Court House Square and Post Office Square; the present Tomochichi Federal Building and U.S. Courthouse is adjacent to the west.

The square is the burial site of Tomochichi, a leader of the Creek nation of Native Americans. Tomochichi was a trusted friend of James Oglethorpe and assisted him in the founding of his colony.

=== Ellis Square ===
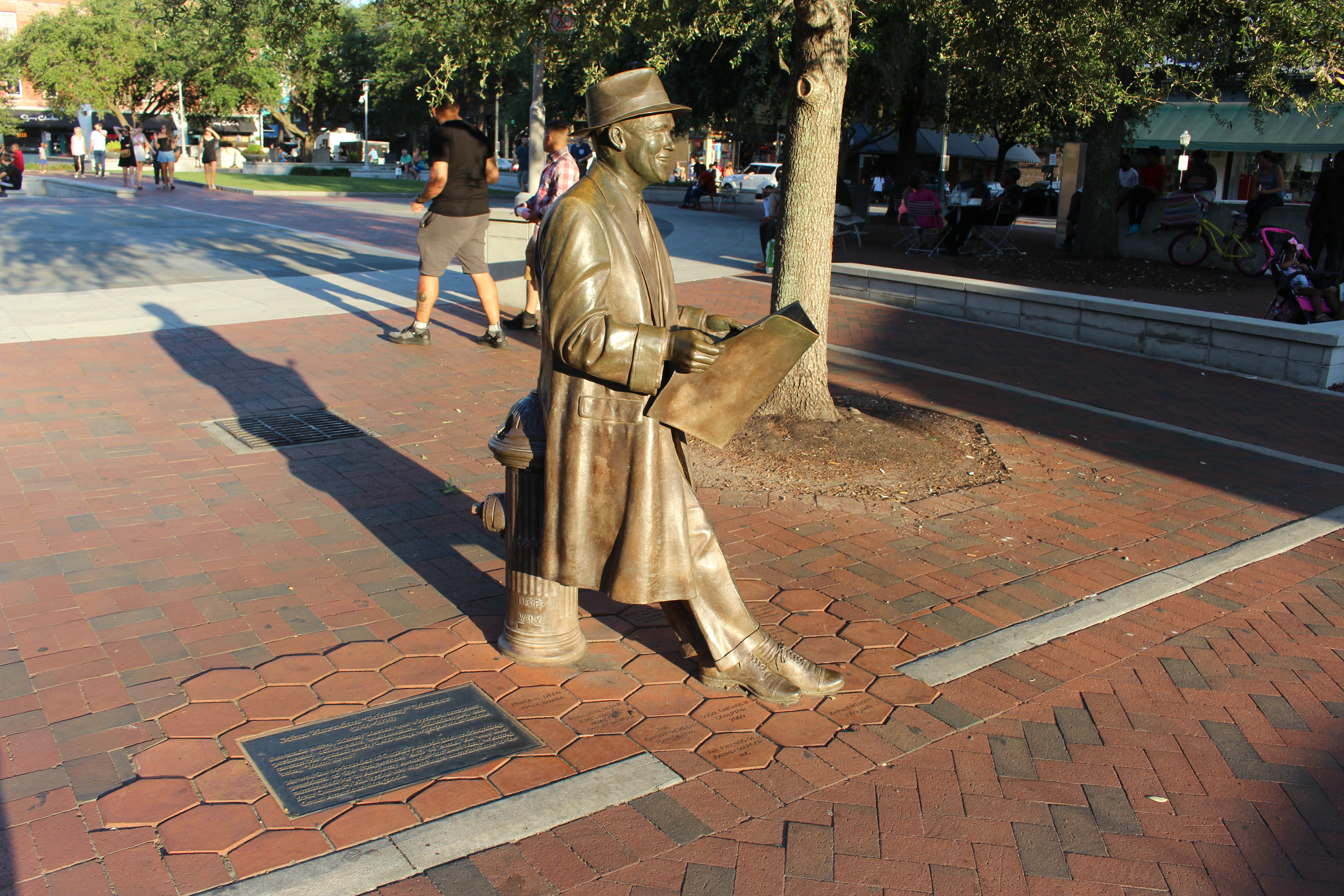
Statue of Johnny Mercer on the western side of Ellis Square

What was originally called Decker Square is located on Barnard between Bryan and Congress Streets. It was laid out in 1733 as part of Decker Ward, the third ward created in Savannah. The ward and square were named for Sir Matthew Decker, one of Trustees for the Establishment of the Colony of Georgia in America, Commissioner of funds collection for the Trust, director and governor of the East India Company, and member of Parliament. The square was renamed for Sir Henry Ellis, the second Royal Governor of the colony of Georgia.

It was also known as Marketplace Square, as from the 1730s through the 1950s it served as a center of commerce and was home to four successive market houses. Prior to Union General Sherman's arrival in December 1864, it was also the site of a slave market with some indications of slaves being held under the northwest corner of the square.

In 1954, the city signed a 50-year lease with the Savannah Merchants Cooperative Parking Association, allowing the association to raze the existing structure and construct a parking garage to serve the City Market retail project. Anger over the demolition of the market house helped spur the historic preservation movement (most notably the Historic Savannah Foundation) in Savannah.

When the garage's lease expired in 2004, the city began plans to restore Ellis Square. It was officially reopened at a dedication ceremony held on March 11, 2010. A bronze statue, by Susie Chisholm, of songwriter-lyricist Johnny Mercer, a native Savannahian, was formally unveiled in Ellis Square on November 18, 2009.

=== Telfair Square ===
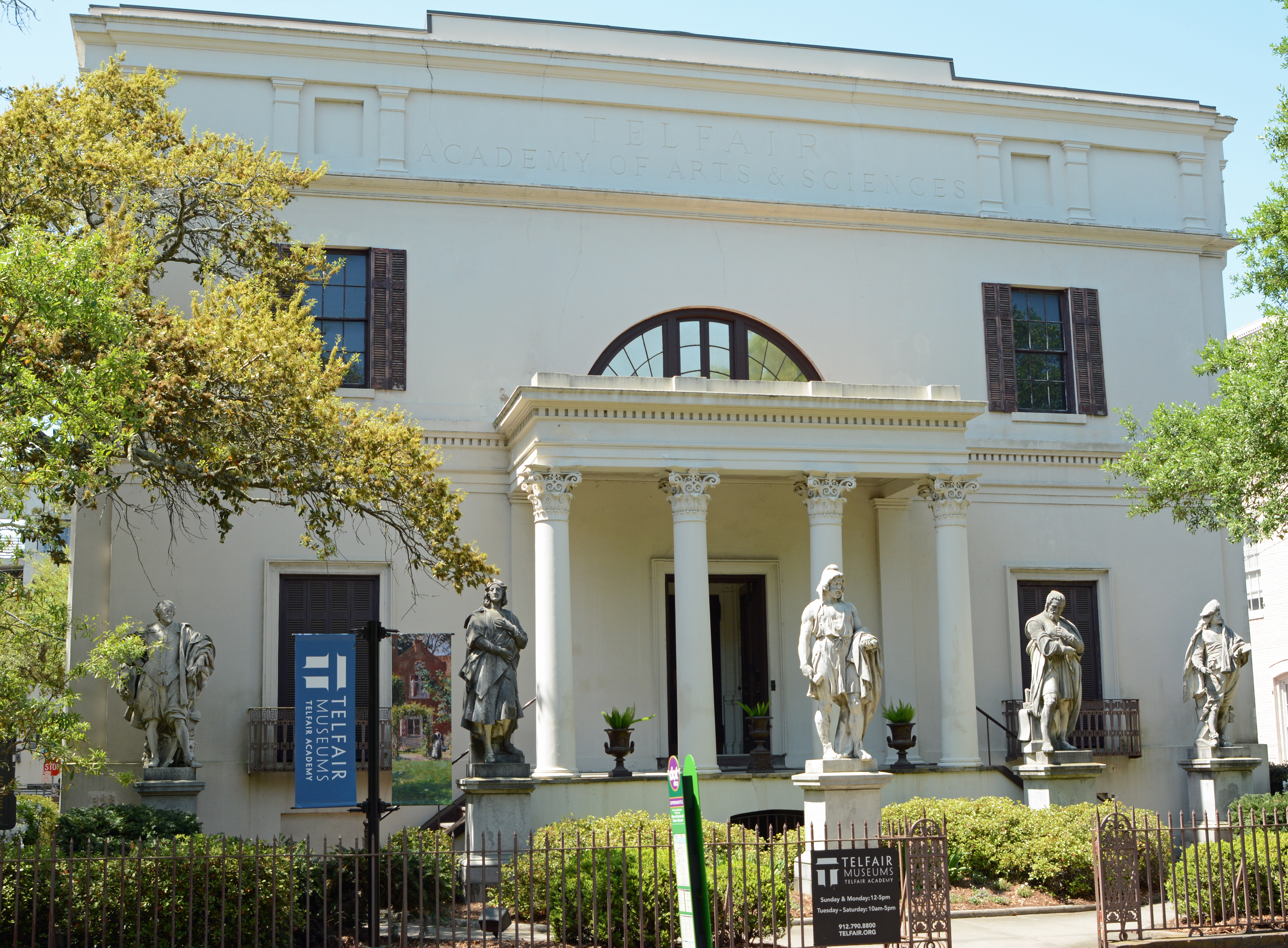
Telfair Academy, in the northwestern civic block of Telfair Square

St. James Square was named in honor of a green space in London, England, and marked one of the most fashionable neighborhoods in early Savannah. It was renamed in 1883 to honor the Telfair family, and it is the only square honoring a family rather than an individual. The Telfairs included former Governor Edward Telfair, Congressman Thomas Telfair (Edward Telfair's son), and Mary Telfair (1791–1875), benefactor of Savannah's Telfair Museum of Art. Telfair Academy overlooks the western side of the square. The square also contains tributes to the Girl Scouts of the USA, founded by Savannahian Juliette Gordon Low, and to the chambered nautilus. Telfair Square is located on Barnard Street, between State and York streets.

== Two new squares ==
Oglethorpe's plan called for six wards and squares. Lower New Square and Upper New Square—now Reynolds and Oglethorpe Squares—completed the founder's vision.

=== Reynolds Square ===
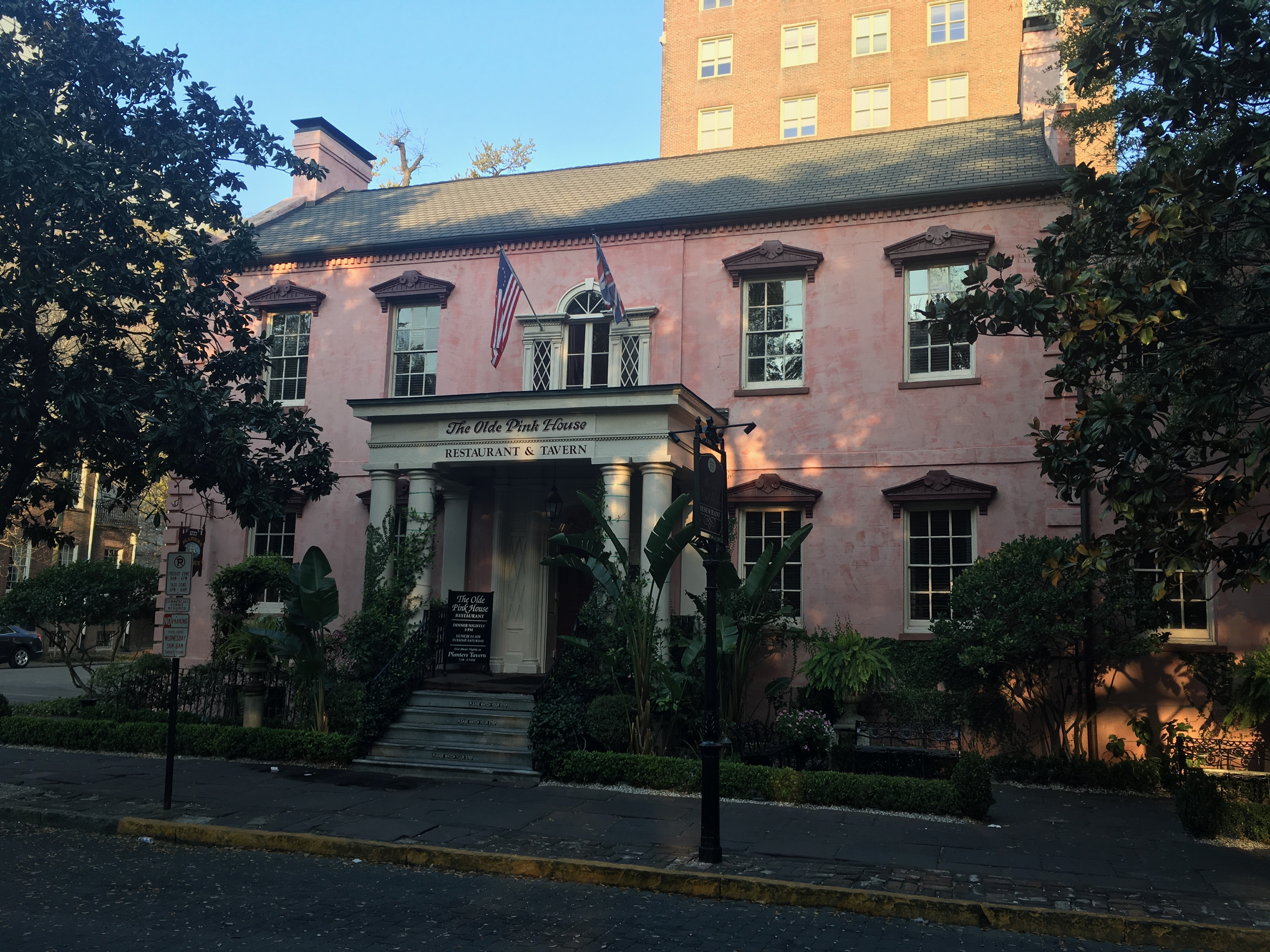
The Olde Pink House, Reynolds Square, 2007

Originally known as Lower New Square, laid out in 1734, the square was later renamed for Captain John Reynolds, governor of Georgia in the mid-1750s.

The square contains a bronze statue by Marshall Daugherty honoring John Wesley, founder of Methodism. Wesley spent most of his life in England but undertook a mission to Savannah (1735–1738), during which time he founded the first Sunday school in America. The statue was installed in 1969 on the spot where Wesley's home is believed to have stood. The statue is intended to show Wesley preaching out-of-doors as he did when leading services for Native Americans, a practice which angered church elders who believed that the Gospel should only be preached inside the church building.

Reynolds Square was the site of the Filature, which housed silkworms as part of an early—and unsuccessful—attempt to establish a silk industry in the Georgia colony. It is located on Abercorn, between Bryan and Congress Streets.

The Olde Pink House (also known as Habersham House) stands in the square's northwestern trust lot. Immediately to its south, across East Saint Julian Street and in the southwestern trust lot, is the Oliver Sturges House.

=== Oglethorpe Square ===
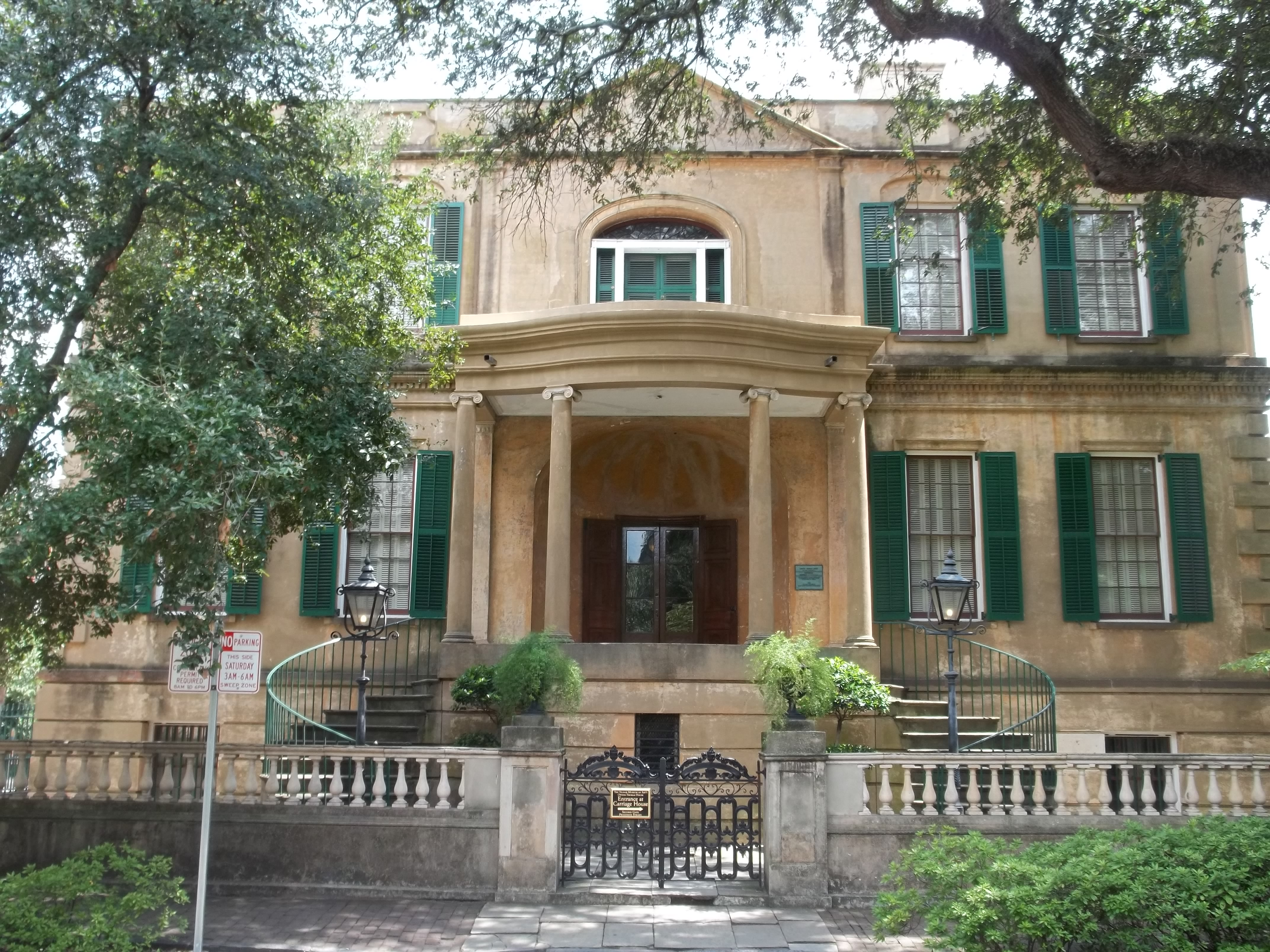
The Owens–Thomas House stands on the eastern side of Oglethorpe Square

Upper New Square was laid out in 1742 and was later renamed in honor of Georgia founder General James Oglethorpe. His statue is located in Chippewa Square, to the southwest.

The home of Georgia's first Royal Governor, John Reynolds, was located on the southeastern trust lot (now a parking lot of The Presidents' Quarters Inn) overlooking the square. Reynolds arrived in Savannah October 29, 1754.

The residences of the Royal Surveyors of Georgia and South Carolina were located on the northeastern trust lots, the site of today's Owens–Thomas House. The Presidents' Quarters Inn, a 16-room historic bed and breakfast, is located on the southeastern trust lots.

The square contains a pedestal honoring Moravian missionaries who arrived at the same time as John Wesley and settled in Savannah from 1735 to 1740, before resettling in Pennsylvania.

A Savannah veterans’ group had unsuccessfully proposed erecting a memorial to veterans of World War II in Oglethorpe Square (which was installed on River Street).

The Unitarian Universalist Church was originally based on the square, prior to its move to the western side of Troup Square in 1860.

== The 1790s ==
Savannah grew rapidly in the late 18th century and six new wards were established in the 1790s alone, including the four that now comprise the northeastern quadrant of the Historic District. The new wards expanded the grid by one unit to the west and by two to the east. Due to space restrictions these new wards are slightly narrower laterally than the original six.

=== Washington Square ===
Built in 1790, Washington Square was named in 1791 for the first President of the United States, who visited Savannah in that year. It was one of only two squares named to honor a then-living person; Troup Square was the other.

Washington Square was the site of the Trustees' Garden.

The square was once the site of massive New Year's Eve bonfires; these were discontinued in the 1950s.

In 1964, Savannah Landscape Architect Clermont Huger Lee and Mills Bee Lane Jr. planned and initiated a project to close the fire lane, add North Carolina bluestone pavers, initiate the use of different paving materials, install water cisterns, and lastly install new walks, benches, lighting, and plantings.

=== Franklin Square ===
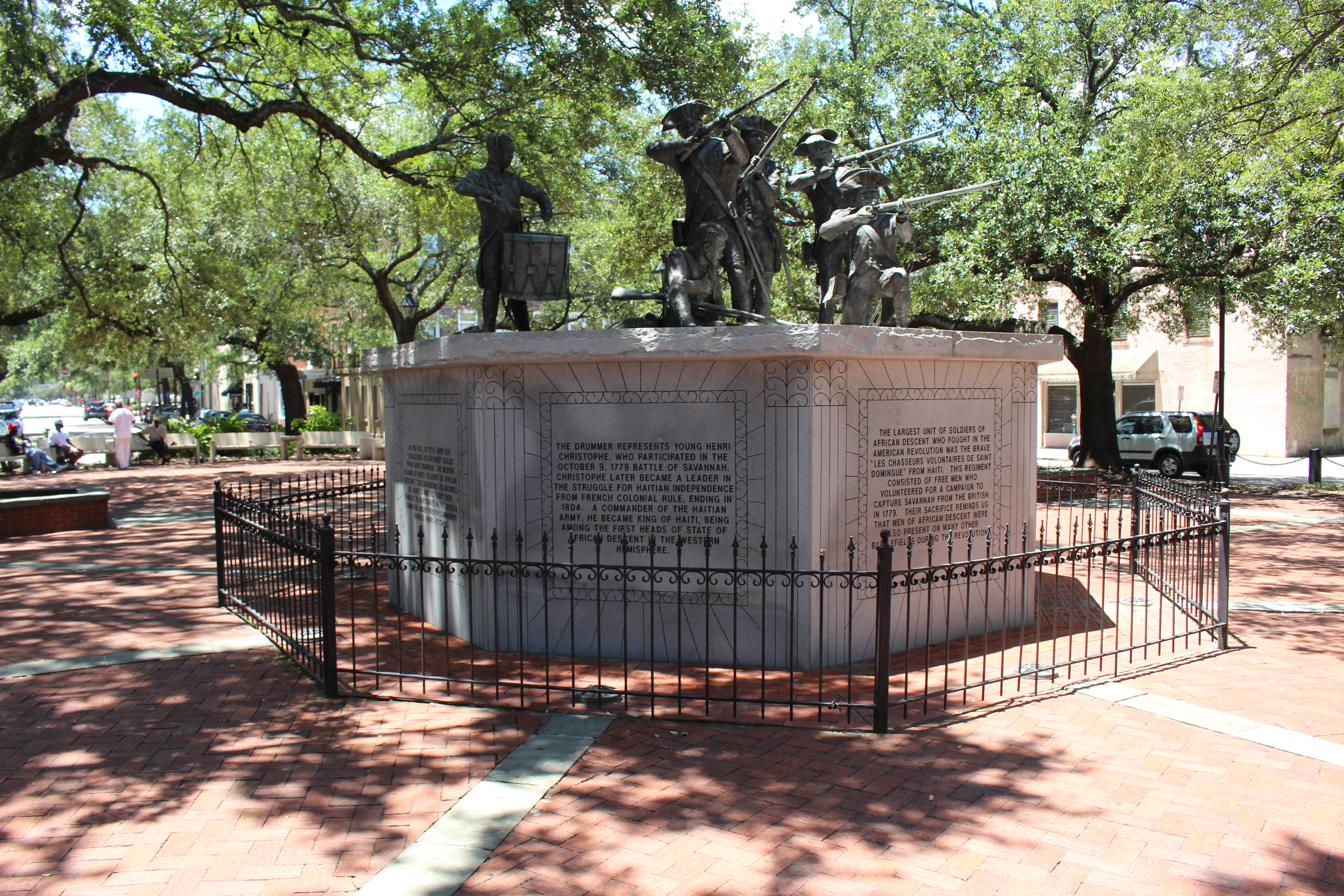
Haitian memorial in Franklin Square

Franklin Square was designed and laid out in 1790. It is located on the western end of town at the intersection of Montgomery Street and W Julian Street, bordered on the north side by W Bryan St and on the south side by W Congress St. It was named in 1791 for Benjamin Franklin, who served as an agent for the colony of Georgia from 1768 to 1778 and who had died in 1790.

The square was destroyed in 1935 but was restored in the mid-1980s. The memorial sculpture includes a depiction of 12-year-old Henri Christophe, who became the commander of the Haitian army and King of Haiti.

=== Warren Square ===
Warren Square was laid out in 1791 and named for General Joseph Warren, a Revolutionary War hero killed at the Battle of Bunker Hill and who had served as President of the Provincial Government of Massachusetts. British gunpowder seized by Savannahians had been sent to aid the Americans at Bunker Hill. The "sister city" relationship between Savannah and Boston survived even the Civil War, and Bostonians sent shiploads of provisions to Savannah shortly after the city surrendered to General Sherman in 1864. Warren Square is on Habersham, between Bryan and Congress Streets.

In 1963, Savannah Landscape Architect Clermont Huger Lee and Mills Bee Lane Jr. planned and initiated a project to replace the sand square with plantings, add walks, benches, lighting and plantings, and install barriers to prevent drive through for fire lane.

=== Columbia Square ===
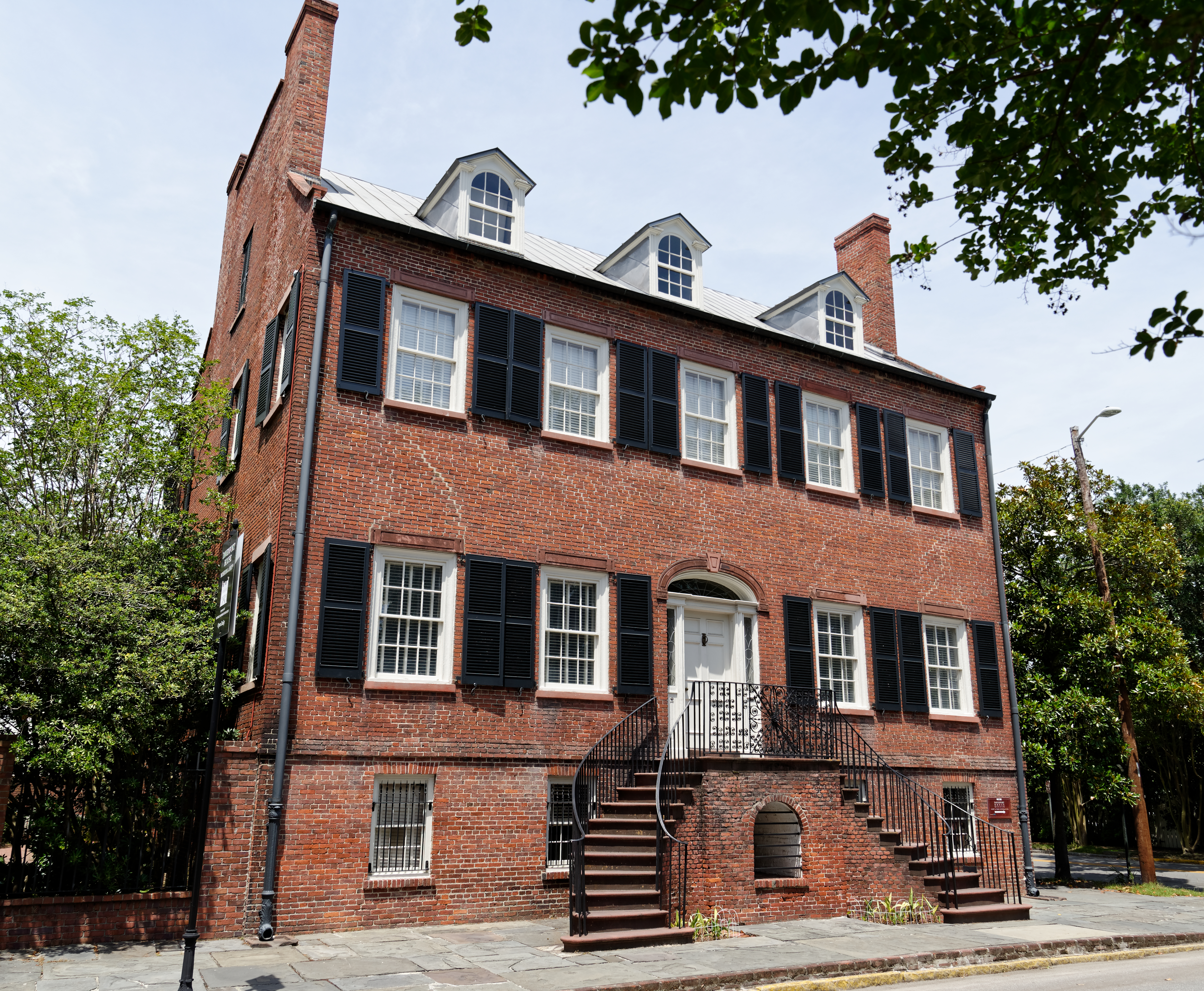
Isaiah Davenport House stands in the northwestern residential block of Columbia Square

Columbia Square was laid out in 1799 and is named for Columbia, the poetic personification of the United States. It is located on Habersham, between State and York Streets. In the center of the square is a fountain that formerly stood at Wormsloe, the estate of Noble Jones, one of Georgia's first settlers. It was moved to Columbia Square in 1970 to honor Augusta and Wymberly DeRenne, descendants of Jones. It is sometimes called the "rustic fountain," as it is decorated with vines, leaves, flowers, and other woodland motifs.

=== Greene Square ===
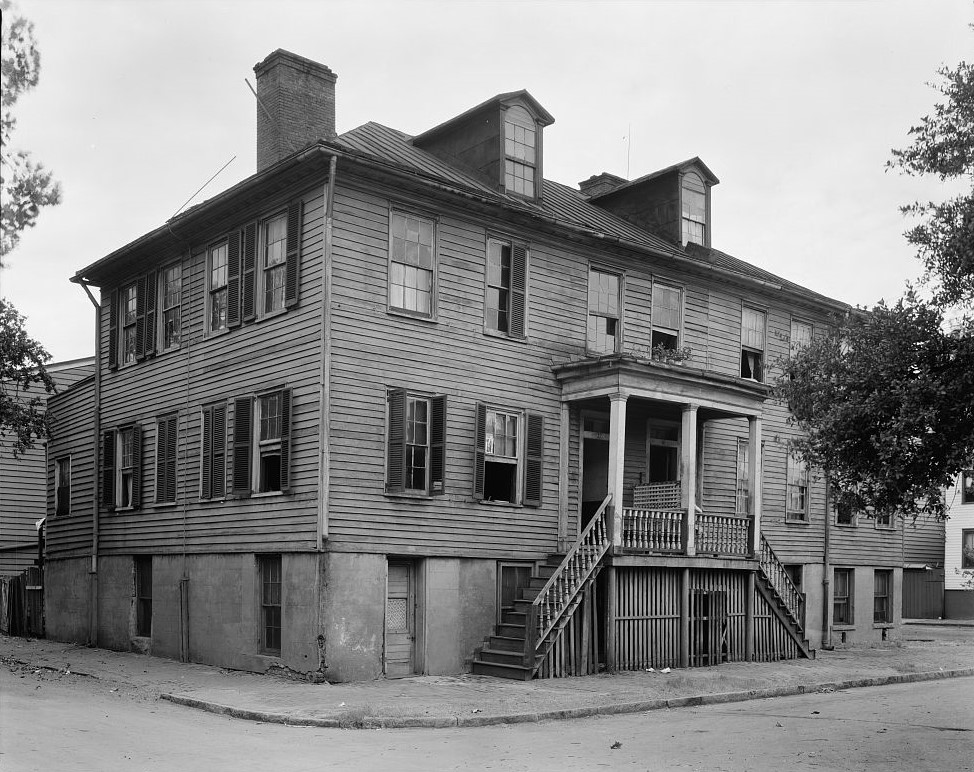
124 Houston Street, a relatively late addition to Greene Square, as it looked during World War II

Greene Square was laid out in 1799 and is named for Revolutionary War hero General Nathanael Greene, one of George Washington's most effective generals.

=== Liberty Square ===
Liberty Square was laid out in 1799 and named in honor of the Sons of Liberty and the victory over the British in the Revolutionary War. It was located on Montgomery between State and York Streets. It was paved over to make way for improvements to Montgomery Street. A small portion remains and is the site of the "Flame of Freedom" sculpture.

== 19th-century squares ==
Expansion of Oglethorpe's grid of wards and squares continued through the first half of the 19th century, until a total of 24 squares stood in downtown Savannah.

=== Elbert Square ===
Elbert Square was laid out in 1801 and named for Samuel Elbert, a Revolutionary soldier, sheriff of Chatham County, and Governor of Georgia. It was located on Montgomery between Hull and Perry streets. It was paved over to make way for improvements to Montgomery Street and today is represented by a small grassy area across Montgomery from the west entrance to the Civic Center.

=== Chippewa Square ===
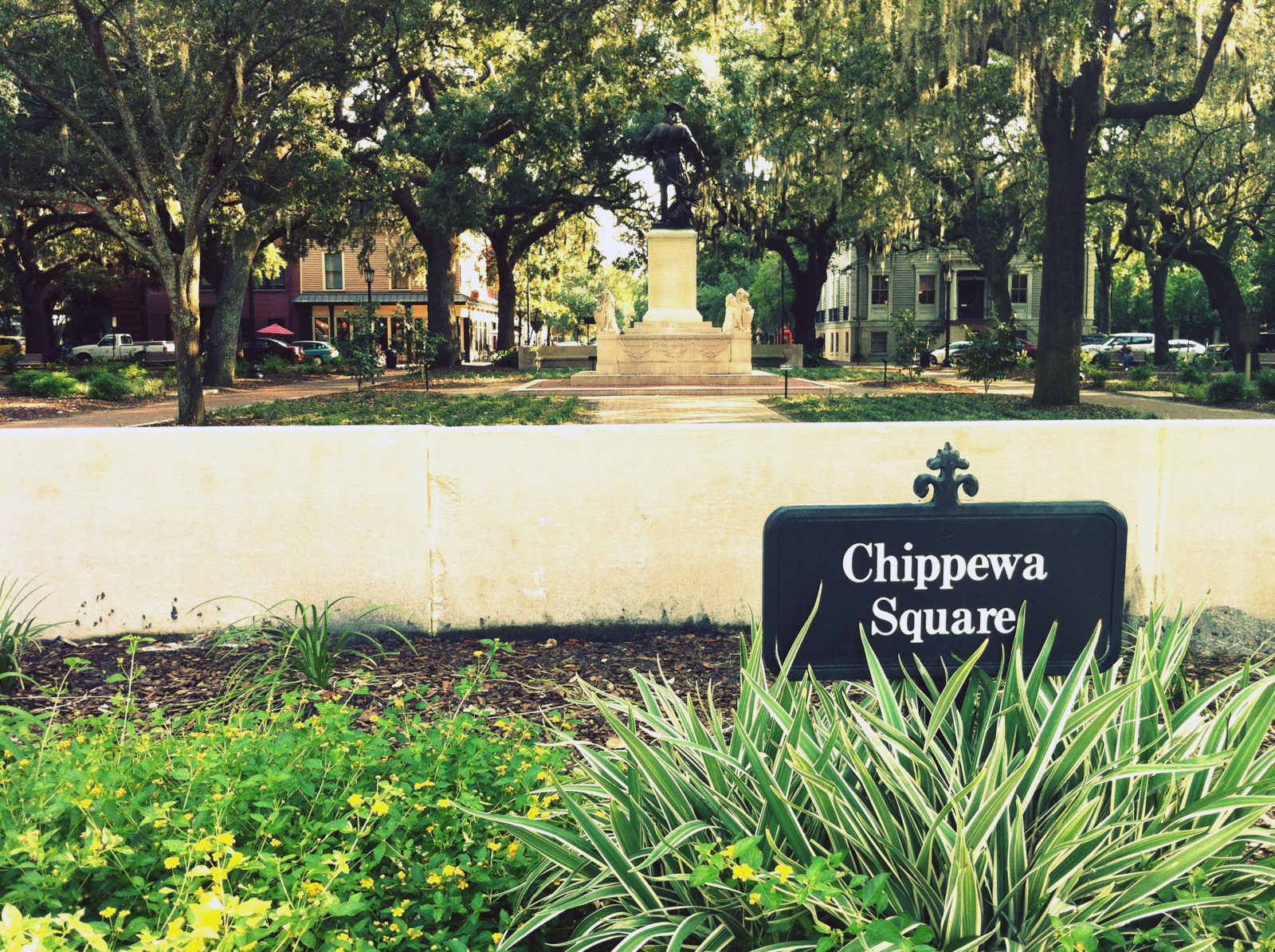
Chippewa Square

Chippewa Square was laid out in 1815 and named in honor of American soldiers killed in the Battle of Chippawa during the War of 1812. (The spelling "Chippewa" is correct in reference to this square.)

In the center of the square is the James Oglethorpe Monument, created by sculptor Daniel Chester French and architect Henry Bacon and unveiled in 1910. Oglethorpe faces south, toward Georgia's one-time enemy in Spanish Florida, and his sword is drawn. Busts of Confederate figures Francis Stebbins Bartow and Lafayette McLaws were moved from Chippewa Square to Forsyth Park to make room for the Oglethorpe monument. Due to the location of the monument, Savannahians sometimes refer to this as Oglethorpe Square, although the actual Oglethorpe Square sits just to the northeast.

The "park bench" scene which opens the 1994 film Forrest Gump was filmed on the north side of Chippewa Square.

Chippewa Square is also home to First Baptist Church (1833), the Philbrick-Eastman House (1844), and The Savannah Theatre (1818).

=== Orleans Square ===
Orleans Square was laid out in 1815, commemorating General Andrew Jackson's victory at the Battle of New Orleans in January of that year. In the center of the square the German Memorial Fountain honors early German immigrants to Savannah. Installed in 1989 it commemorates the 250th anniversary of Georgia and of Savannah, as well as the 300th anniversary of the arrival in Philadelphia of 13 Rhenish families. Orleans Square is located on Barnard, between Hull and Perry Streets, and is adjacent to the Savannah Civic Center.

=== Lafayette Square ===
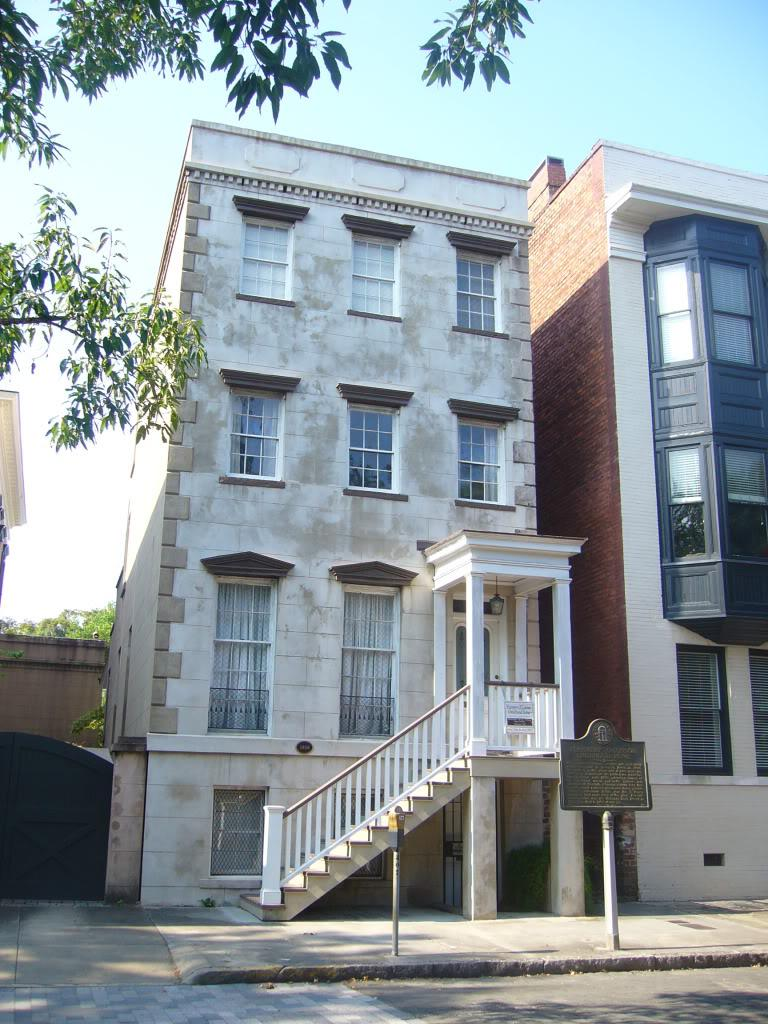
Flannery O'Connor's childhood home stands in the southeastern residential block of Lafayette Square

The square contains a fountain commemorating the 250th anniversary of the founding of the Georgia colony, donated by the Colonial Dames of Georgia in 1984, as well as cobblestone sidewalks.

Adjacent to the square is the Roman Catholic Cathedral Basilica of St. John the Baptist. Given this proximity, Lafayette Square features prominently in Savannah's massive Saint Patrick's Day celebrations. Water in the fountain is dyed green for the occasion.

In this area is the museum known as the Flannery O'Connor Childhood Home, which is open to the public.

Marist Place, the former Marist School for Boys, stands in the southwest tithing of the square.

The square is named for Gilbert du Motier, Marquis de Lafayette, the French hero of the American Revolution who visited Savannah in 1825.

=== Pulaski Square ===
Pulaski Square was laid out in 1837 and is named for General Casimir Pulaski, a Polish-born Revolutionary War hero who died of wounds received in the siege of Savannah (1779). It is one of the few squares without a monument—General Pulaski's statue is actually in nearby Monterey Square.

Prior to the birth of the historical preservation movement and the restoration of much of Savannah's downtown Pulaski sheltered a sizeable homeless population and was one of several squares that had been paved to allow traffic to drive straight through its center.

Pulaski square is located on Barnard, between Harris and Charlton Streets, and is known for its live oaks.

=== Madison Square ===
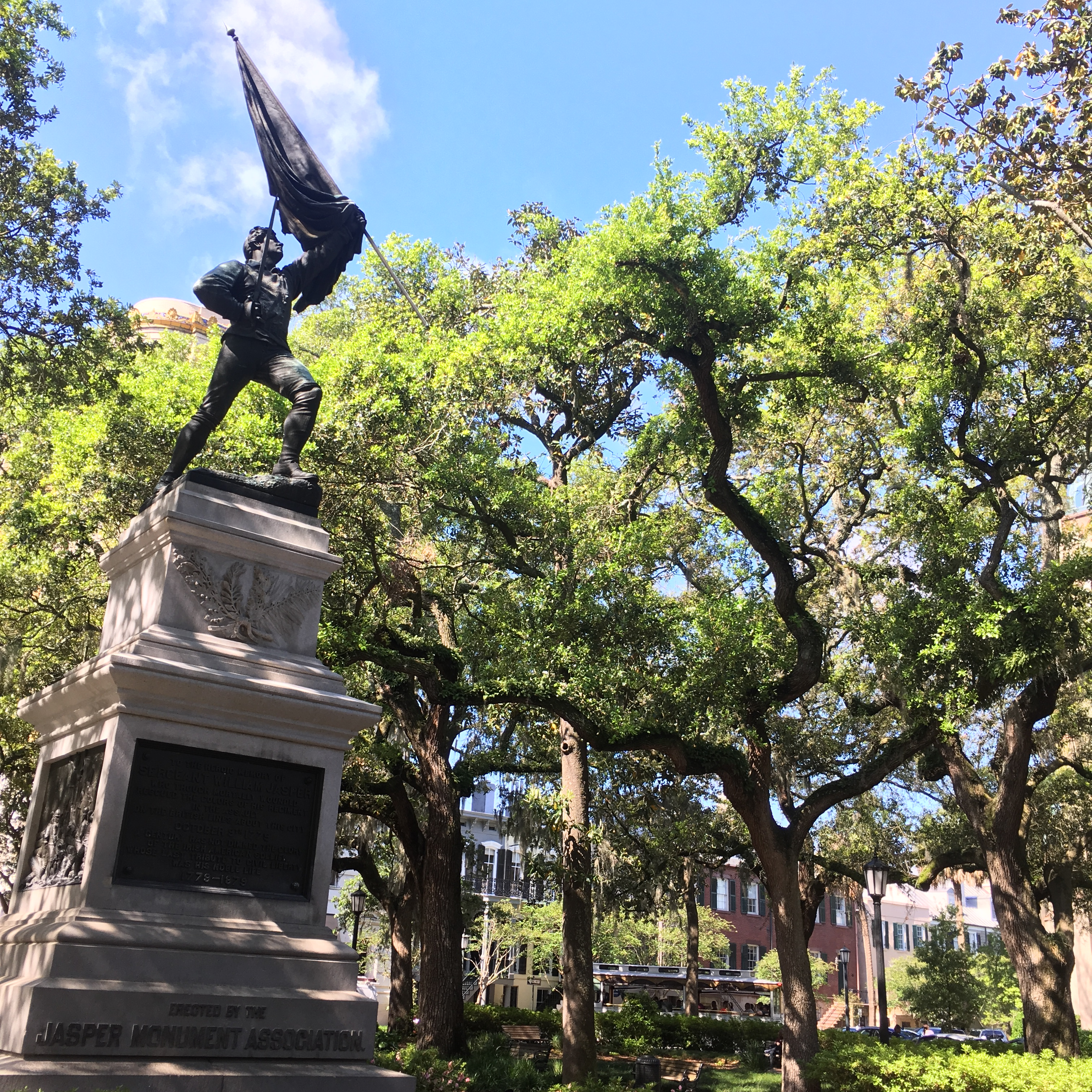
The William Jasper Monument in Madison Square

Madison Square was laid out in 1837 and named for James Madison, fourth President of the United States.

In the center of the square is the William Jasper Monument, an 1888 work by Alexander Doyle memorializing Sergeant William Jasper, a soldier in the siege of Savannah who, though mortally wounded, heroically recovered his company's banner. Savannahians sometimes refer to this as Jasper Square, in honor of Jasper's statue.

Madison Square features a vintage cannon from the Savannah Armory. These now mark the starting points of the first highways in Georgia, the Ogeechee Road leading to Darien and the Augusta Road.

The square also includes a monument marking the center of the British resistance during the siege.

In 1971 Savannah Landscape Architect Clermont Huger Lee and Mills B. Lane planned and initiated a project to install new walk patterns with offset sitting areas and connecting walks at curbs, add new benches, lighting and planting.

=== Crawford Square ===
Crawford Square was laid out in 1841 and named in honor of Secretary of the Treasury William Harris Crawford. Crawford ran for president in 1824 but came in third, after winner John Quincy Adams and runner-up Andrew Jackson.

Although Crawford is the smallest of the squares, it anchors the largest ward, as Crawford Ward includes the territory of Colonial Park Cemetery.

During the era of Jim Crow, this was the only square in which African-Americans were permitted.

While all squares were once fenced, it is the only one that remains so. Crawford Square has also retained its cistern, a holdover from early fire fighting practices. After a major fire in 1820 firemen maintained duty stations in the squares, each of which was equipped with a storage cistern.

=== Chatham Square ===
Chatham Square was laid out in 1847 and named in 1851 for William Pitt, 1st Earl of Chatham. Although Pitt never visited Savannah he was an early supporter of the Georgia colony and both Chatham Square and Chatham County are named in his honor.

The square is sometimes known locally as Barnard Square, in reference to the 1901-built Barnard Street School (which actually stands at 212 West Taylor Street) and has served as a building for the Savannah College of Art and Design since 1988. The college renamed it Pepe Hall.

=== Monterey Square ===
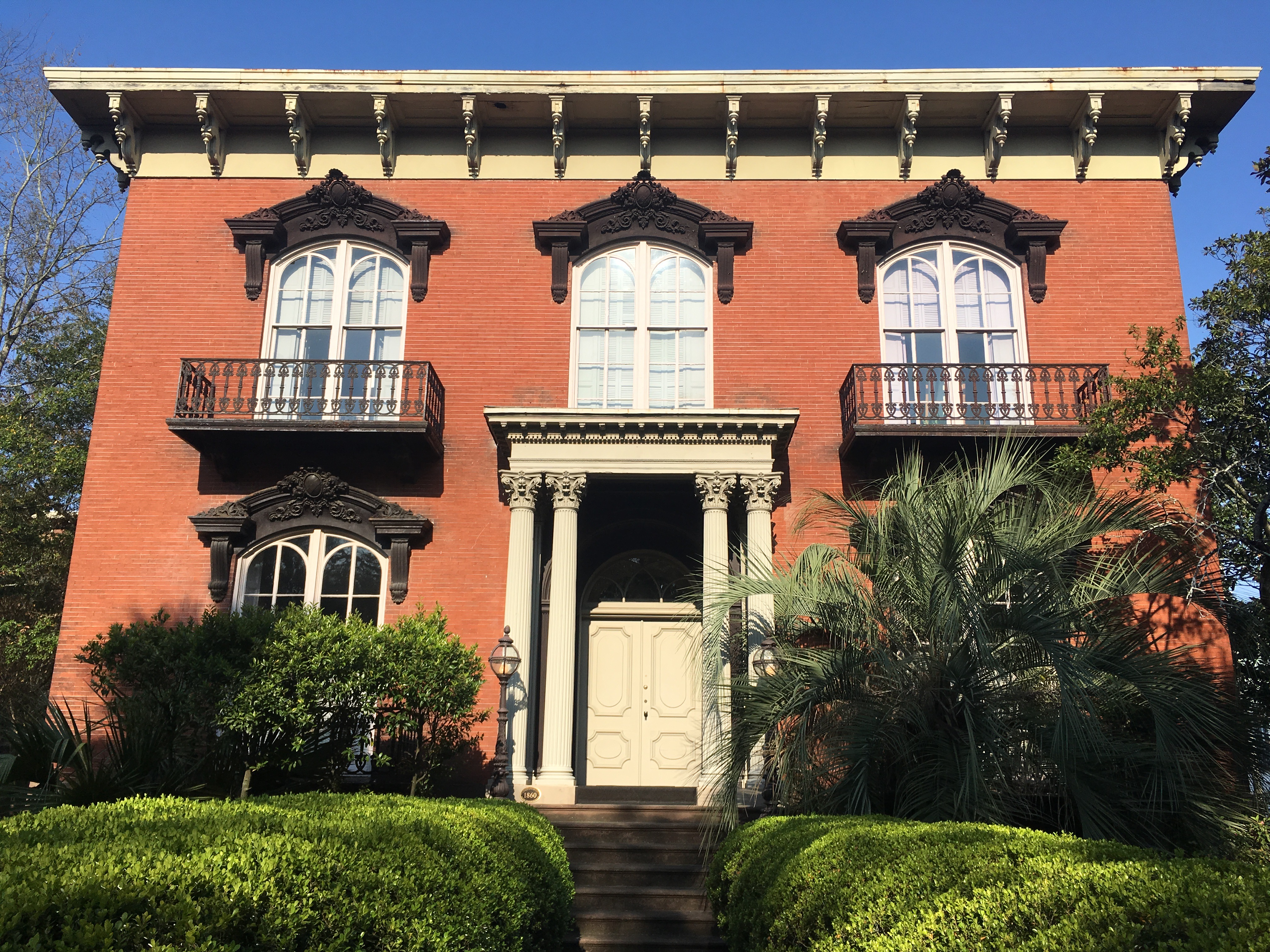
Mercer Williams House Museum in Monterey Square

Monterey Square was laid out in 1847 and commemorates the Battle of Monterrey (1846), in which American forces under General Zachary Taylor captured the city of Monterrey during the Mexican–American War. (The correct spelling in reference to the square is "Monterey", with a single r.)

In the center of the square is an 1853 monument honoring General Casimir Pulaski.

Monterey Square is the site of Mercer House, built by Hugh Mercer and more recently the home of antiques dealer and conservator Jim Williams. The house (which fills an entire block), and the square itself, were featured prominently in John Berendt's 1994 true crime novel Midnight in the Garden of Good and Evil (written before Ellis Square was reinstated). Monterey Square has been used as a setting for several motion pictures, including the 1997 film version of Berendt's novel. The Comer House is also featured in the movie.

The square also is home to Congregation Mickve Israel, which boasts one of the few Gothic-style synagogues in America, dating from 1878.

All but one of the buildings surrounding the square are original to the square, the exception being the United Way Building.

=== Troup Square ===
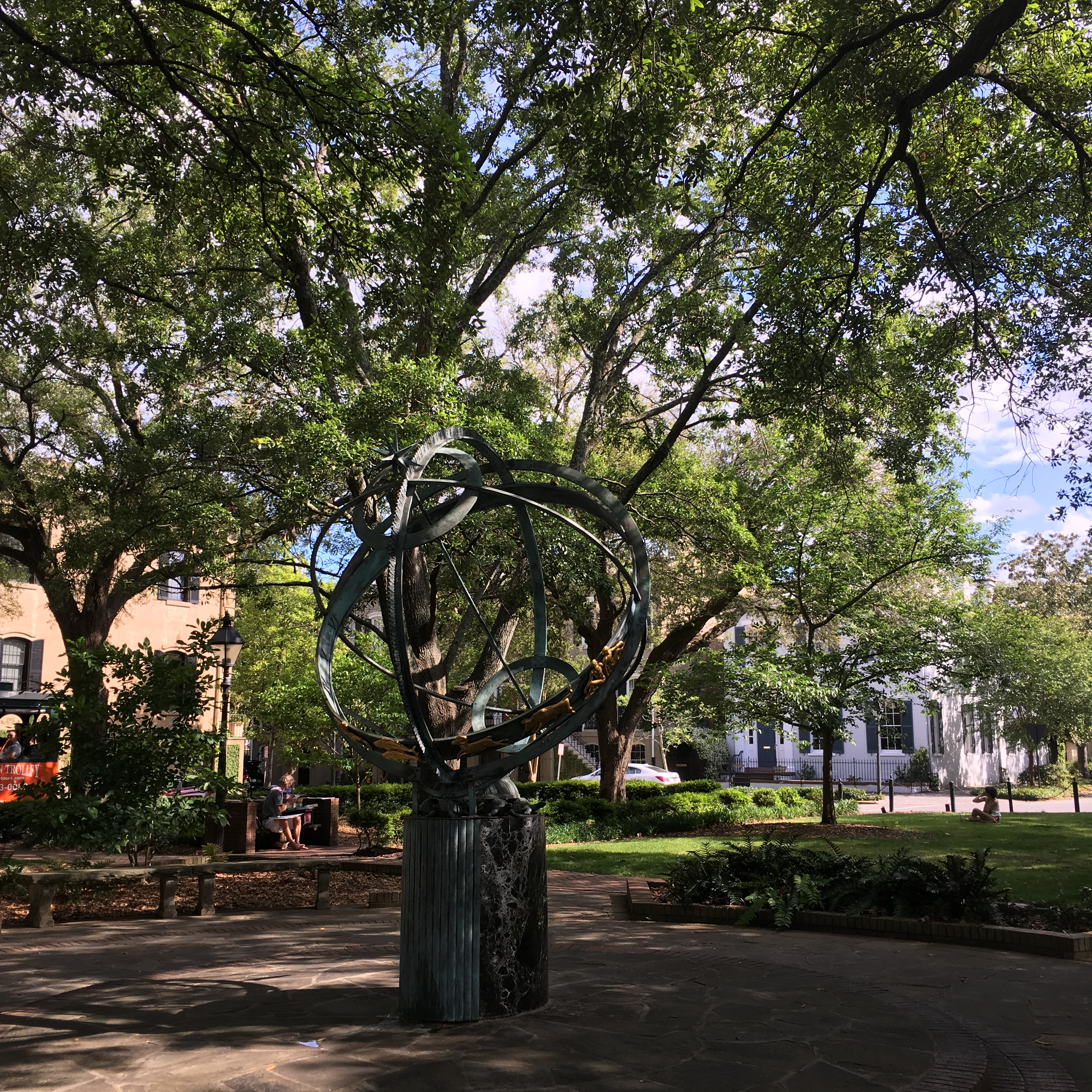
The armillary sphere in the center of Troup Square

Troup Square was laid out in 1851 and is named for former Georgia Governor, Congressman, and Senator George Troup. It is one of only two squares named for a person living at the time (the other being Washington Square). A large iron armillary sphere stands in the center of the square, supported by six small metal turtles.

A special dog fountain is located on the west side of the square. The Myers Drinking Fountain was a gift from Savannah mayor Herman Myers in 1897 and originally placed in Forsyth Park. When moved to Troup Square its height was adjusted for canine use and has become the site of an annual Blessing of the Animals.

The Unitarian Universalist Church sits on the western side of the square. It is believed that James Lord Pierpont wrote the tune to "Jingle Bells" while he was the church's music director, but other sources claim he only copyrighted it when he was in the role, and that he wrote it in Medford, Massachusetts.

In 1969, Savannah Landscape Architect Clermont Huger Lee and Mills B Lane planned and initiated a project to remove the central vandalized playground, close the fire lane, install an armillary sundial, and add new walls, benches, lighting, and plantings.

=== Taylor Square ===
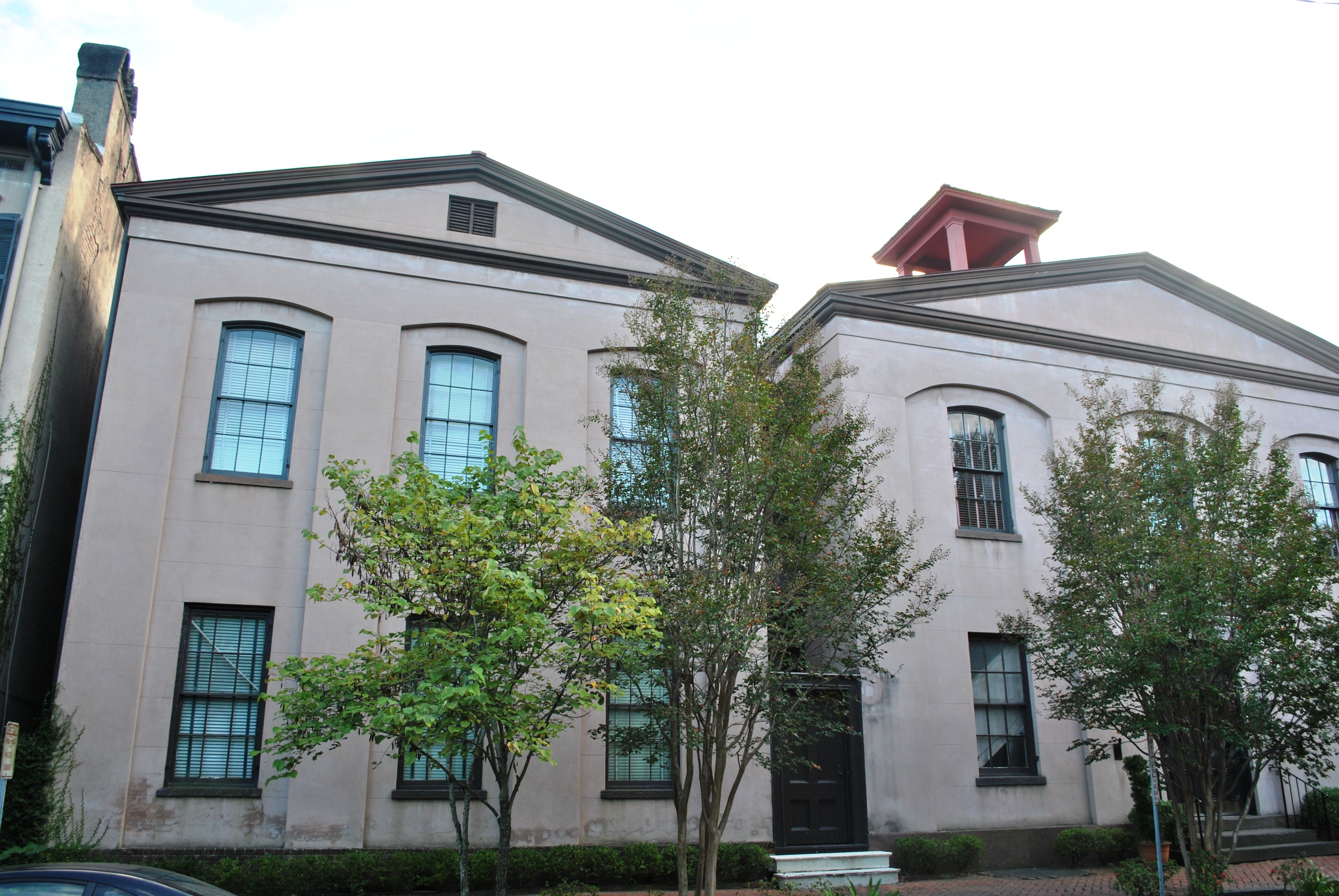
Massie Common School House, Taylor Square

Taylor Square was laid out in 1851 and was originally named for South Carolina statesman John C. Calhoun, who served as Secretary of War, Secretary of State, and as vice president under John Quincy Adams and Andrew Jackson. In 2023, it was renamed Taylor Square, in honor of the first American Civil War black nurse, educator and memoirist Susie King Taylor.

The square is sometimes called Massie Square, in reference to a neighborhood school.

The square is also home to Wesley Monumental United Methodist Church, founded in 1868.

It is the only square with all of its original buildings intact.

The square is believed to have been built over a slave burial ground, with around one thousand bodies buried in it. In 2004 a skull was found by utility workers outside the Massie Heritage Interpretation Center on the square's southeastern side.

=== Whitefield Square ===
Whitefield Square was laid out in 1851, the final square built.

It is named for the Rev. George Whitefield, founder of Bethesda Home for Boys (a residential education program – formerly the Bethesda Orphanage) in the 18th century, and still in existence on the south side of the city.

The square has a gazebo in its center.

Andrew Bryan, the founder of the First African Baptist Church, is buried in the square, as is Henry Cunningham, the minister of the Second African Baptist Church.

== Forsyth Park ==
After 1851, as the city expanded south of Gaston Street, further extensions of Oglethorpe's grid of wards and squares were abandoned. Forsyth Park, located just south of Monterey Ward, was intended to be a single large park that would serve the growing southern portion of the city just as the squares had served their individual wards. The original northern portion of the park, surrounding the well-known fountain, occupied an area the size of an entire ward from the old city, and the park more than doubled in size during later years. Other, smaller neighborhood parks have been established in the southern portions of the city.

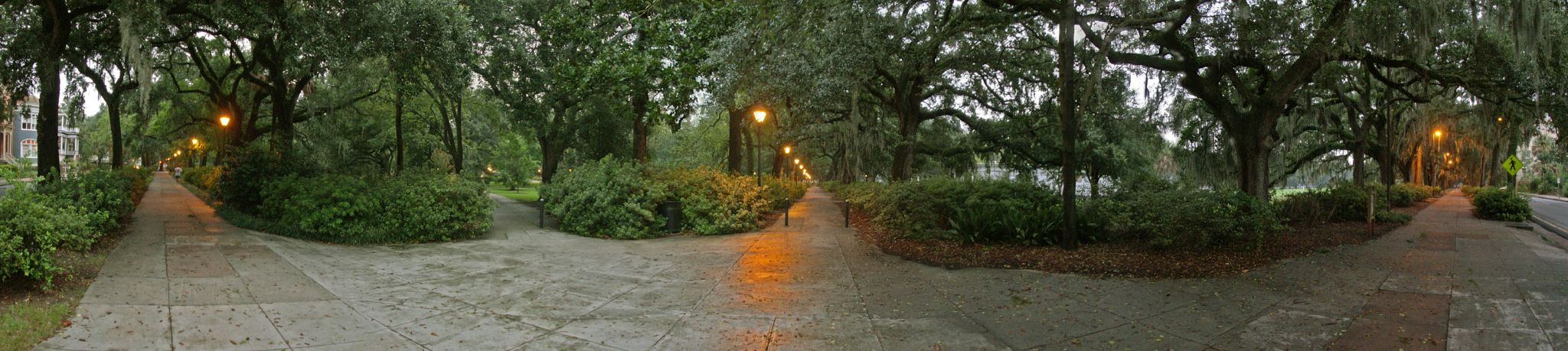
Panoramic view of Forsyth Park

== Summary ==
# (Note: The squares of Savannah are not actually numbered. In this specific case, the squares are put in order primarily from the westernmost to the easternmost and also from the northernmost to the southernmost.)	Name	Name origin	Year established	Intersection	Monuments	Landmarks	Status
1.	Franklin	Benjamin Franklin	1790	Montgomery Street and West St. Julian Street	Chasseurs volontaires de Saint-Domingue (Note: The Chasseurs volontaires de Saint-Domingue monument is a tribute to the Haitian-American soldiers who helped the American troops during the siege of Savannah in 1779. Four of the planned six figures were installed on October 8, 2007.)	First African Baptist Church	Nearly lost in the 1970s; restored
2.	Ellis	Henry Ellis, Governor of Georgia	1733	Barnard Street and West St. Julian Street	Johnny Mercer, songwriter, lyricist (sculpture by Susie Chisholm)	City Market	Lost in the 1950s; fully restored in 2010
3.	Johnson	Robert Johnson, Governor of South Carolina	1733	Bull Street and St. Julian Street	Nathanael Greene, Major General	Christ Church (Episcopal)	Preserved
4.	Reynolds	John Reynolds, Governor of Georgia	1734	Abercorn Street and East St. Julian Street	John Wesley, early leader of the Methodist movement	The Olde Pink House; Lucas Theater	Preserved
5.	Warren	Dr. Joseph Warren, Major General	1791	Habersham Street and East St. Julian Street		John David Mongin House; Spencer House	Preserved
6.	Washington	George Washington, U.S. President	1790	Houston Street and East Saint Julian Street		Seaman's House	Preserved
7.	Liberty	Sons of Liberty	1799	133 Montgomery Street	Flame of Freedom	County Courthouse	Mostly lost
8.	Telfair	Edward Telfair, Governor of Georgia (Note: Telfair Square was originally called St. James Square. The name was changed in 1883.)	1733	Barnard Street and West President Street		Telfair Academy of Arts & Sciences; Trinity Methodist Church	Preserved
9.	Wright	James Wright, Governor of Georgia (Note: Wright Square was originally called Perceval Square. The name was changed in 1763.)	1733	Bull Street and President Street	William Washington Gordon, Founder of the Central of Georgia Railway, Mayor of Savannah (Note: Another monument honors Native American Leader Tomochichi on the southeast side of the square. It was offered by the Colonial Dames in Georgia.); Tomochichi, Creek Indian leader	Lutheran Church of the Ascension; Tomochichi Federal Building and U.S. Courthouse; Old County Courthouse	Preserved
10.	Oglethorpe	James Oglethorpe, Founder of Savannah	1742	Abercorn Street and East President Street		Owens-Thomas House, The Presidents' Quarters Inn, Moravian Monument	Preserved
11.	Columbia	Columbia, American symbol	1799	Habersham Street and East President Street	Wormsloe Fountain	Isaiah Davenport House; Kehoe House	Preserved
12.	Greene	Nathanael Greene, Major General	1799	Houston Street and East President Street		Second African Baptist Church	Preserved
13.	Elbert	Samuel Elbert, Governor of Georgia	1801	237 Montgomery Street		Savannah Civic Center	Mostly lost
14.	Orleans	Battle of New Orleans	1815	Barnard Street and West McDonough Street	German Societies Fountain	Harper Fowlkes House; Savannah Civic Center	Preserved
15.	Chippewa	Battle of Chippawa	1815	Bull Street and McDonough Street	James Oglethorpe, Founder of Savannah	James Oglethorpe Monument; First Baptist Church; The Savannah Theatre	Preserved
16.	Crawford	William H. Crawford, U.S. Senator	1841	Houston Street and East McDonough Street	Gazebo (Note: Crawford Square has a playground and also is the only fenced square in Old Savannah's Historical District.)		Preserved
17.	Pulaski	Casimir Pulaski, Brigadier General	1837	Barnard Street and West Macon Street		Francis Bartow House	Preserved
18.	Madison	James Madison, U.S. President	1837	Bull Street and Macon Street	William Jasper, Sergeant	Green-Meldrim House; St. John's Episcopal Church; Scottish Rite Temple; Old Savannah Volunteer Guards Armory; Sorrel Weed House	Preserved
19.	Lafayette	Marquis de La Fayette, Lieutenant General	1837	Abercorn Street and East Macon Street	Semiquincentenary Fountain	Cathedral of Saint John the Baptist; Hamilton-Turner Inn; Andrew Low House	Preserved
20.	Troup	George Troup, Governor of Georgia	1851	Habersham Street and East Macon Street	Armillary sphere	McDonough Row Houses; Kennedy Row; Unitarian Universalist Church	Preserved
21.	Chatham	William Pitt, 1st Earl of Chatham, U.K. Prime Minister	1847	Barnard Street and West Wayne Street		Gordon Row	Preserved
22.	Monterey	Battle of Monterey	1847	Bull Street and Wayne Street	Kazimierz Pułaski, Brigadier General	Congregation Mickve Israel; Mercer House	Preserved
23.	Taylor	John C. Calhoun, U.S. Senator and U.S. vice-president (originally); renamed for Susie King Taylor in 2024	1851	Abercorn Street and East Wayne Street		Wesley Monumental Methodist Church; Massie School	Preserved
24.	Whitefield	George Whitefield, early leader of the Great Awakening	1851	Habersham Street and East Wayne Street	Gazebo	First Congregational Church	Preserved

== Analysis ==
While some authorities believe that the original plan allowed for growth of the city and thus expansion of the grid, the regional plan suggests otherwise: the ratio of town lots to country lots was in balance and growth of the urban grid would have destroyed that balance.

== See also ==
- Sanborn Fire Insurance Maps of Savannah
