= Clermont Huger Lee =

American landscape architect

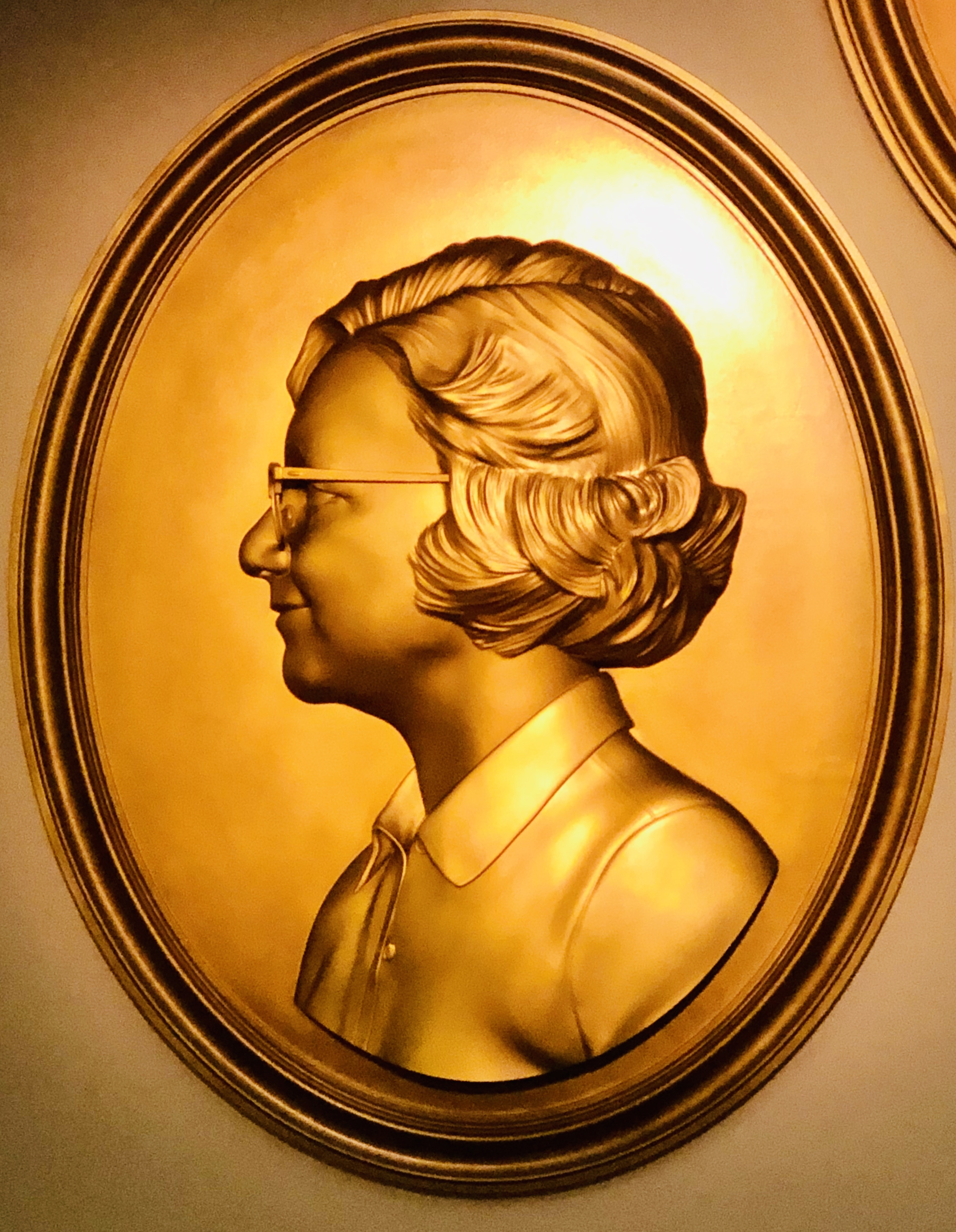
- Gold relief of Lee
- Born: Clermont Huger Lee II; March 4, 1914; Savannah, Georgia, U.S.
- Died: June 14, 2006 (aged 92); Hilton Head Island, South Carolina, U.S.
- Education: Smith College
- Occupation: Architect
- Awards: Georgia Women of Achievement; Savannah Women of Vision
- Buildings: Juliette Gordon Low Birthplace; Isaiah Davenport House; Owens–Thomas House
- Projects: Savannah Squares: Warren; Washington; Greene; Troup; Madison

Clermont Huger Lee (March 4, 1914 – June 14, 2006) was a landscape architect from Savannah, Georgia, most known for her work designing gardens and parks for historical landmarks in the state. Specifically, Lee is known for her designs such as the Juliette Gordon Low Birthplace, Isaiah Davenport House and Owens–Thomas House. Lee assisted in founding of the Georgia State Board of Landscape Architects, which serves as a licensing board for landscape architects throughout Georgia. She is considered one of the first women to establish their own private architecture practice in Georgia and was inducted into the Georgia Women of Achievement in 2017 and Savannah College of Art and Design's Savannah Women of Vision on February 14, 2020. SCAD honors Lee with a gold relief in its Arnold hall.

== Early life and education ==
Lee was born in 1914 in Savannah, Georgia. Lee's father, Lawrence Lee, M.D., worked as a physician and her mother, Clermont Kinloch Huger Lee, was a gardener. She was the oldest sibling with two younger brothers, Lawrence Jr. and Moultrie. She went to school in both the former Pape School in Savannah and Ashley Hall in Charleston, South Carolina, where she graduated in 1932. She went on to attend Barnard College in New York City for two years. Lee transferred from Barnard College to Smith College in Northampton, Massachusetts, where she received a bachelor's degree in Landscape Architecture in 1936. She then attended the Smith College Graduate School of Architecture and Landscape Architecture, where she earned her Masters of Landscape Architecture in 1939.

== Career ==
=== Historic residential gardens ===
Clermont Huger Lee began working with historic gardens in 1940 after completing designs for a garden at the Hofwyl-Broadfield Plantation in Brunswick, Georgia. Lee established her private practice in 1949, and the following year she began working on historic landscapes. It was in this time that Lee completed the renovations of various landmarks such as the Owens–Thomas House, the Juliette Gordon Low Birthplace, the Andrew Low House and the Green–Meldrim House.

Lee developed a master plan for Jekyll Island in 1967–1968 with the goal to restore the area known as "Millionaire's Village" to its 1910–1929 era. Though not fully implemented, Lee's plans served as a foundation in the redevelopment of today's Jekyll Island Historic District.

=== Savannah historic squares ===
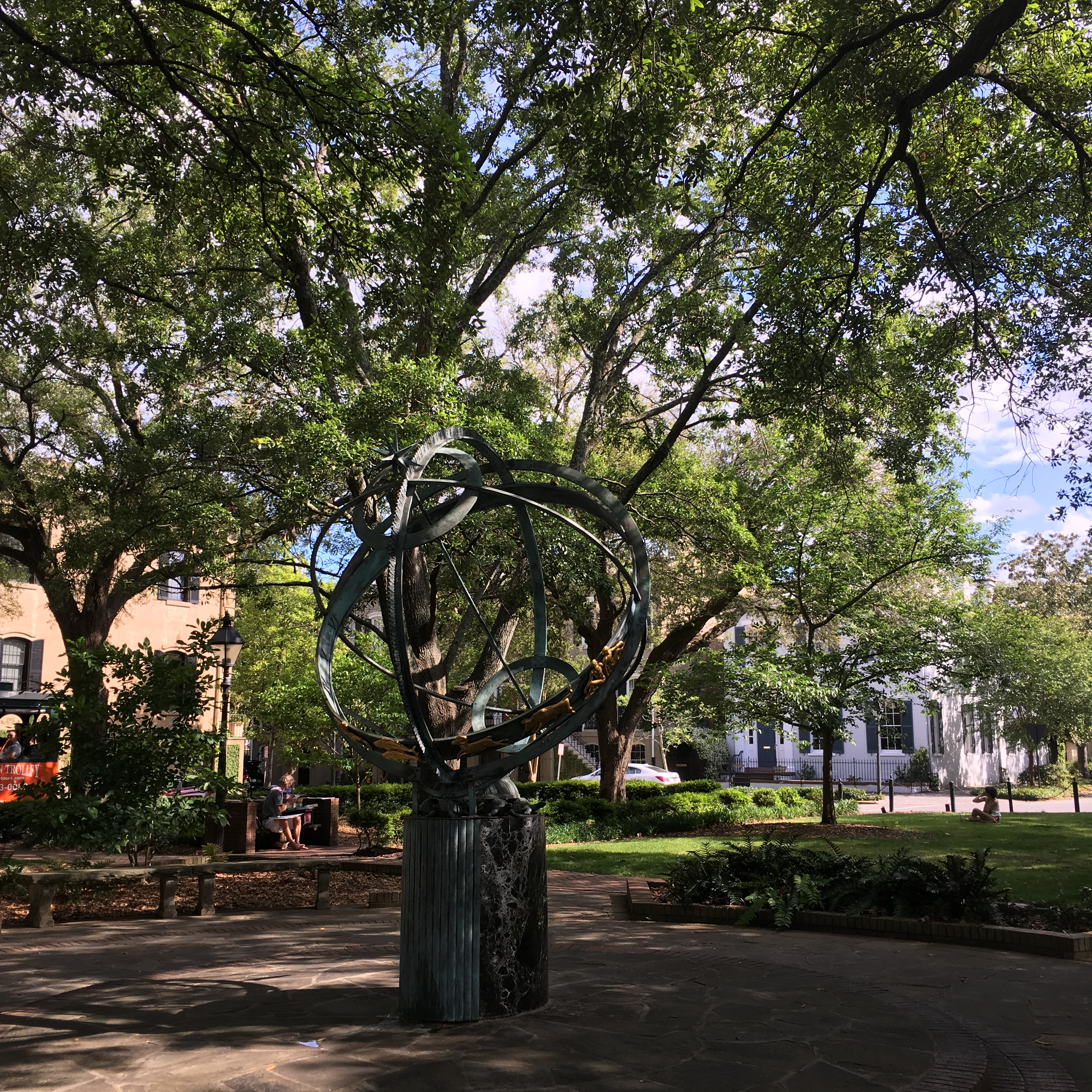
Armillary sphere, Troup Square, Savannah, Georgia

From 1951 to 1972, Lee partnered with the president of the Citizens & Southern National Bank, Mills B. Lane Jr. Alongside Lane, Lee renovated homes of historic significance along the northeast part of Savannah.

Lee suggested rounding the entrance curves to squares instead of destroying the squares with driveways. After several meetings, the city accepted this proposal, leaving the places intact. The spaces designed by Lee remain unchanged.

== Awards ==
Clermont Huger Lee has received two significant post humus awards and recognition.

- 2017 Georgia Women of Achievement.
- 2020 Savannah College of Art and Design's Savannah Women of Vision

Lee shares these two honors with Flannery O’Connor and Juliette Gordon Low, both of whose childhood home gardens Lee worked on. On February 12, 2020, U.S. House of Representative Buddy Carter honored Clermont Lee, fellow Women of Vision inductee Suzanne Shank, and other's on the house floor in Washington, D.C.
