= Sema Wilkes =

American restaurateur (1907–2002)

- Born: Sema Americus Morris; June 23, 1907; Vidalia, Georgia, U.S.
- Died: October 31, 2002 (aged 95); Savannah, Georgia, U.S.
- Resting place: Forest Lawn Memory Gardens, Savannah, Georgia, U.S.
- Occupations: Restaurateur, cookbook writer

Sema Morris Wilkes (June 23, 1907 – October 31, 2002) was an American restaurateur and author. She owned Mrs. Wilkes' Dining Room in Savannah, Georgia, for 59 years. The restaurant was named one of America's Classics by the James Beard Foundation in 2000.

== Life and career ==
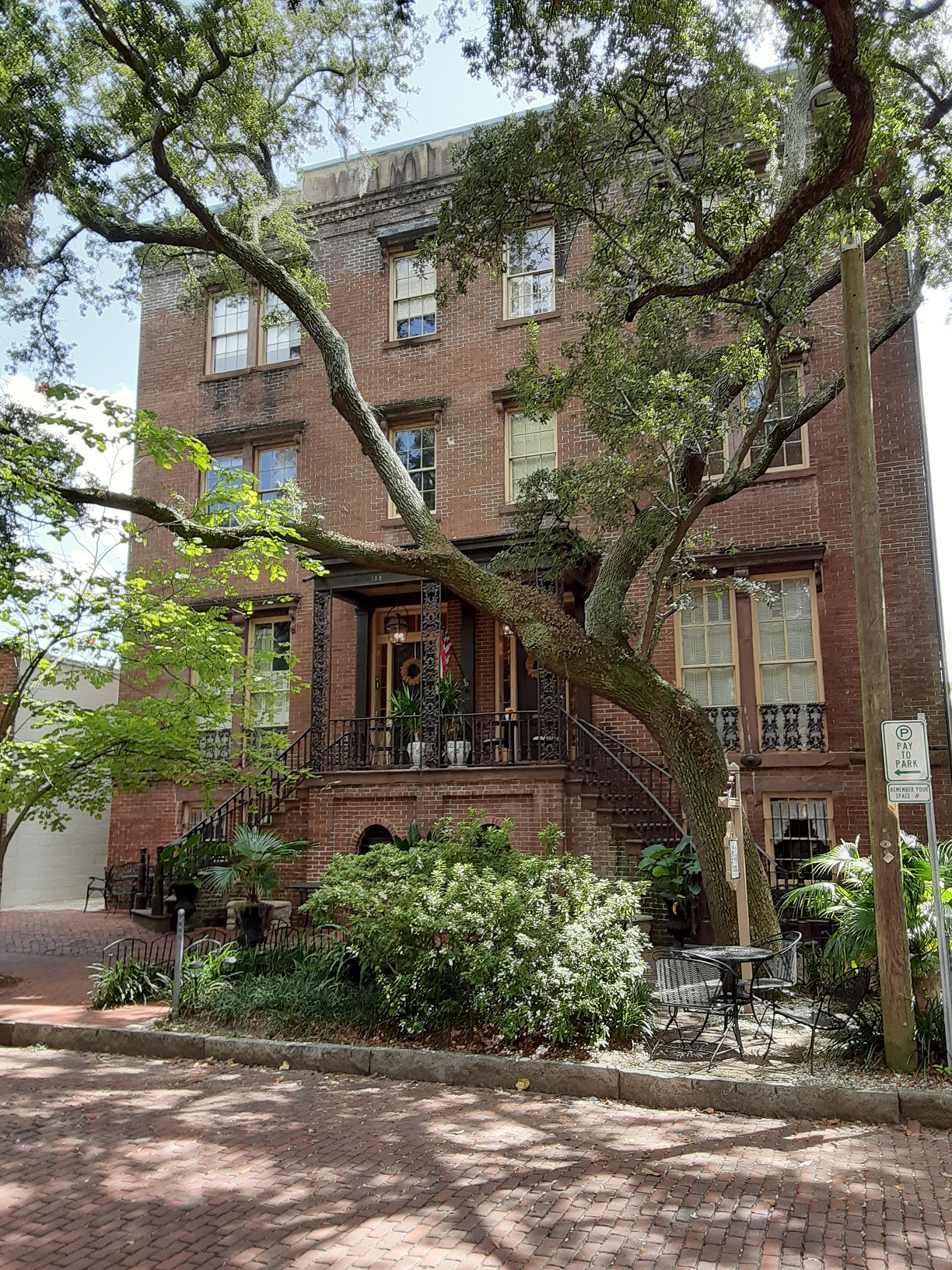
Mrs. Wilkes' Boarding House occupied the right-hand side of the Algernon Hartridge Duplex in Savannah

Sema Americus Morris was born in Vidalia, Georgia, in 1907 to farmers William Lawton Morris and Sarah Emily Taylor. She was their eldest child, arriving before brother Lawton and a sister who died in infancy. After her mother's death in 1914, when Morris was seven years old, her father married Maymie Shively. It was at this point that Morris began cooking for her family and their farmhands. Her father had a daughter, Bernice, with his second wife before his death from cancer in 1923.

Also in 1923, aged 16, Morris married another farmer, Lois Herman Wilkes. They had three children: an infant daughter who died at birth, Margie (born 1926) and Carlton (born 1932). The family was forced to leave their farm, by eminent domain in 1942, when it was to be replaced by an airfield. Lois moved to Savannah, Georgia, to find new employment, and began working for Southern Railway.

In 1943, the Wilkeses opened a restaurant, Mrs. Wilkes' Dining Room, on West Jones Street in Savannah. Wilkes had worked there in its previous guise, Mrs. Dennis Dixon's Boardinghouse, having come to know the owner after Lois stayed there during his job search.

In 2000, the restaurant was named one of America's Classics by the James Beard Foundation.

Savannah College of Art and Design (SCAD) inducted Wilkes into the Savannah Women of Vision program in 2018.

Wilkes was a member of Savannah's Wesley Monumental United Methodist Church.

=== Publications ===
- Famous Recipes, from Mrs. Wilkes' Boarding House in Historic Savannah (1976)
- Mrs. Wilkes' Boardinghouse Cookbook: Recipes and Recollections from Her Savannah Table (2001)

== Death ==
Wilkes died in Savannah in 2002, aged 95. She was interred in the city's Forest Lawn Memory Gardens, alongside her husband of 67 years, who died in 1990, and her son, Carlton, who died in 1975.
