= Savannah Women of Vision =

Investiture honoring women from Savannah, Georgia, U.S.

The Savannah Women of Vision investiture, created by Savannah College of Art and Design (SCAD) President and Founder Paula Wallace, commemorates women of notable altruistic and intellectual achievement from Savannah, Georgia. The first induction was in 2016 at SCAD Arnold Hall, and has continued biennially.

== About the investiture ==
The origins of the Savannah Women of Vision investiture can be traced to the proscenium in the university's historic Arnold Hall, anchored by a New Deal-era mural that depicts Savannah's historical leaders: Button Gwinnett, Nathanael Greene, George Whitefield, and Casimir Pulaski, among others. Wallace noticed the omission of women in this visual depiction of the notable citizens of Savannah. As Wallace explains, "Savannah as we know it rests on the triumphs of its women — mothers, entrepreneurs, authors, patriots, philanthropists. I created the Savannah Women of Vision investiture to illuminate trailblazers and their transcendent work, keeping their names and deeds not only in our hearts but publicly acclaimed. These are our heroines."

== Inductees ==
Savannah Women of Vision
Name	Image	Birth–Death	Year	Area of achievement	Ref(s)
Sarah Mills Hodge		(1875–1962)	2022	aka Sarah Wilson Hodge - Community service	
Linda J. Evans			2022	Established the first Medical and Natural Sciences Career Academy for high school students in the Southfield Public Schools system	
Gale Singer			2022	Founder and president of Circa Lighting	
Joyce M. Roche		(1947–)	2022	Former President/CEO, Girls Inc	
Clermont Huger Lee		(1914–2006)	2020	Landscape Architect	
Suzanne Shank		(1952–)	2020	Entrepreneur, Investment Banker	
Miriam Center		(1926–)	2018	Real Estate Agent, Civil Leader	
Edna Jackson		(1944–)	2018	Two Term Mayor of Savannah	
Mary Lane Morrison		(1907–1994)	2018	Archivist	
Fredericka Washington		(1903–1994)	2018	Actress, Civil Rights Leader	
Sema Wilkes		(1907–2002)	2018	Restaurateur	
Emma Morel Adler		(1930–2020)	2016	Civil Leader	
Mother Mathilda Beasley		(1832–1903)	2016	Georgia's first African-American nun	
Mary Musgrove Matthews Bosomworth		(ca. 1700–ca. 1765)	2016	pivotal interpreter, negotiator, and cultural liaison between the English colonists and the local indigenous Americans	
Alice Andrews Jepson		(1942–)	2016	Civic Leader	
Nancy N. Lewis		(1927–2019)	2016	Civic Leader	
Juliette Gordon Low		(1860–1927)	2016	Founder of Girl Scouts of the USA	
Abigail Minis		(1701–1794)	2016	mother of Savannah's Jewish community	
Flannery O'Connor		(1925–1964)	2016	Author	
Leah Ward Sears		(1955–)	2016	Former chief justice of the Supreme Court of Georgia	
Frances Wong		(1940–2010)	2016	Educator	

== About the reliefs ==
To commemorate the Savannah Women of Vision and their impact on the community, SCAD commissioned alumnus Michael Porten to create large relief portraits of the honorees. Although the portraits are executed in classic bas-relief — a style of portraiture perfected by the ancient Greeks — Porten uses advanced tools and software to render each woman's visage in sculpture, infusing a classic medium with modern technology. The gilded finish holds meaning, as gold traditionally represents generosity and compassion.
