= Mrs. Wilkes' Dining Room =

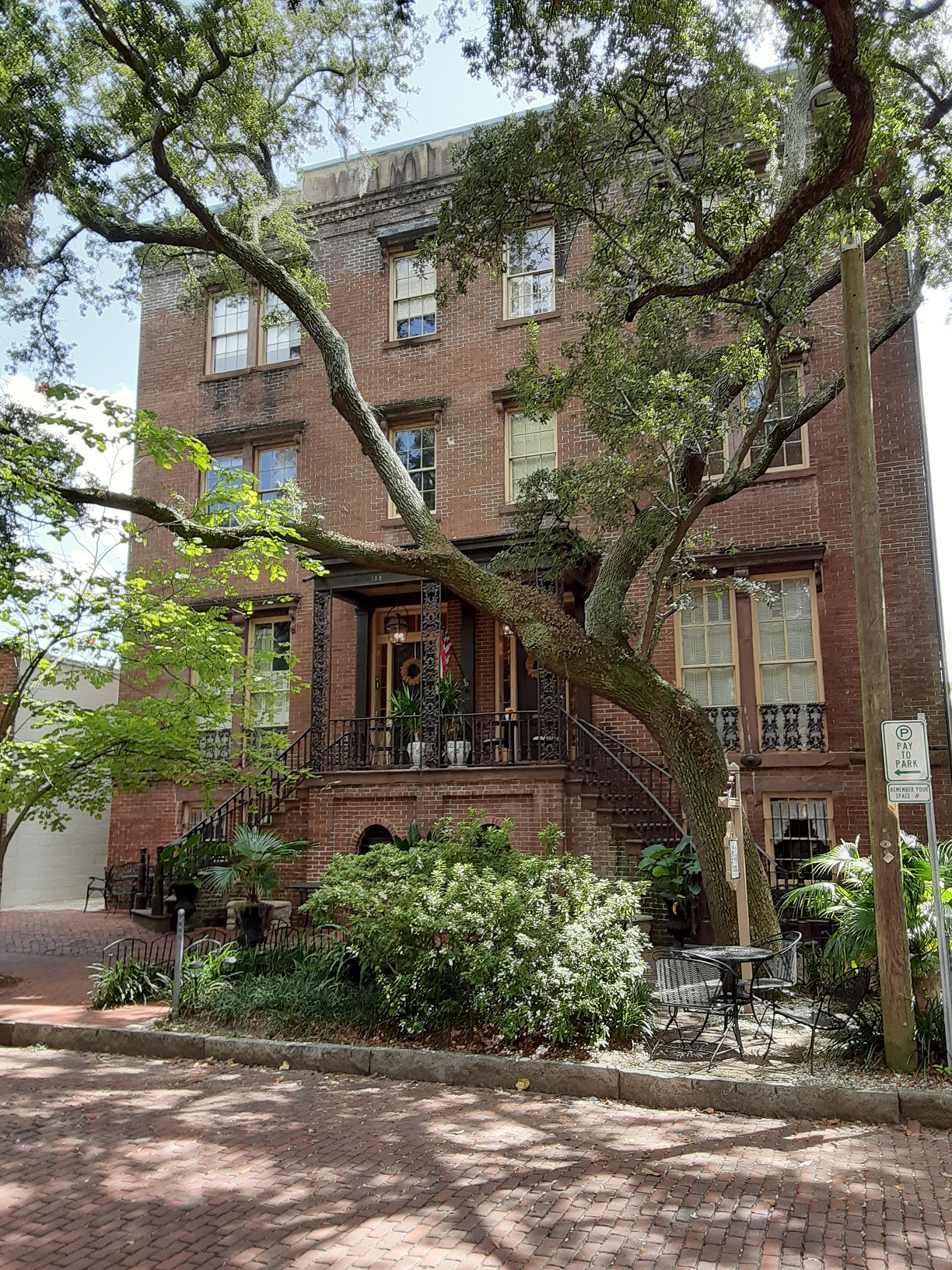
- The restaurant (on the right) in 2021

- Location within Georgia

Restaurant information
- Established: 1943; 83 years ago
- Location: 107 West Jones Street, Savannah, Chatham County, Georgia, 31401, United States
- Coordinates: 32.072645°N 81.095934°W
- Website: mrswilkes.com

Mrs. Wilkes' Dining Room is a casual restaurant in Savannah, Georgia, US which offers a menu of Southern US home cooking. Situated in a historic house dated to 1870, it is a popular dining spot in the city. The restaurant was owned and managed by Sema Wilkes for 59 years, from 1943 until her death in 2002 at age 95.

== History ==
Mrs. Wilkes' Dining Room was previously the dining hall of the Wilkes House, a downtown boardinghouse. Today the restaurant is housed on the ground floor of the same historic house, built in 1870, at 107 West Jones Street. The restaurant was described by author William Schemmel as "a treasure hidden away in a historic district town-house." Its longtime owner, Sema Wilkes, published several cookbooks. As of 2024 her family continued to run the restaurant, serving lunch on weekdays.

Mrs. Wilkes and her restaurant have been the subject of newspaper and magazine articles. Japanese chef Hoshinao Naguma was once apprenticed to the restaurant.

== Customs ==
Mrs. Wilkes' is noted for its homestyle traditions, in which guests are escorted in shifts of ten into the dining room, where a variety of dishes are freshly laid on one of several long tables. There is no menu; dishes are selected by the restaurant and change daily. Travel Holiday in 1993 recalled that the "tables were set with steaming bowls and platters of tasty Southern food".

The guests sit at the table and pass the dishes around to one another like a family. There are usually long queues waiting to get in.

== Notable guests ==
- David Brinkley once broadcast directly from the restaurant
- President Obama ate at the restaurant with Mayor Otis Johnson and other guests in 2010, having baked beans, fried chicken, and sweet corn
- Robert Duvall, Kate Smith, and Gregory Peck ate at the restaurant
- The cast of Magic Mike XXL ate at the restaurant in October 2014

== Gallery ==
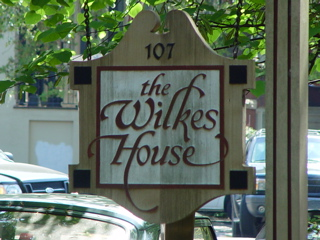
Mrs. Wilkes' Dining Room is located in a former boardinghouse known as the Wilkes House

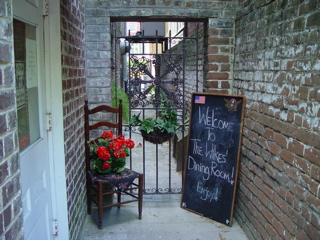
Entrance to Mrs. Wilke's Dining Room

== See also ==
- List of James Beard America's Classics
