= Sanborn Fire Insurance Maps of Savannah =

Historical publication by The Sanborn Map Company

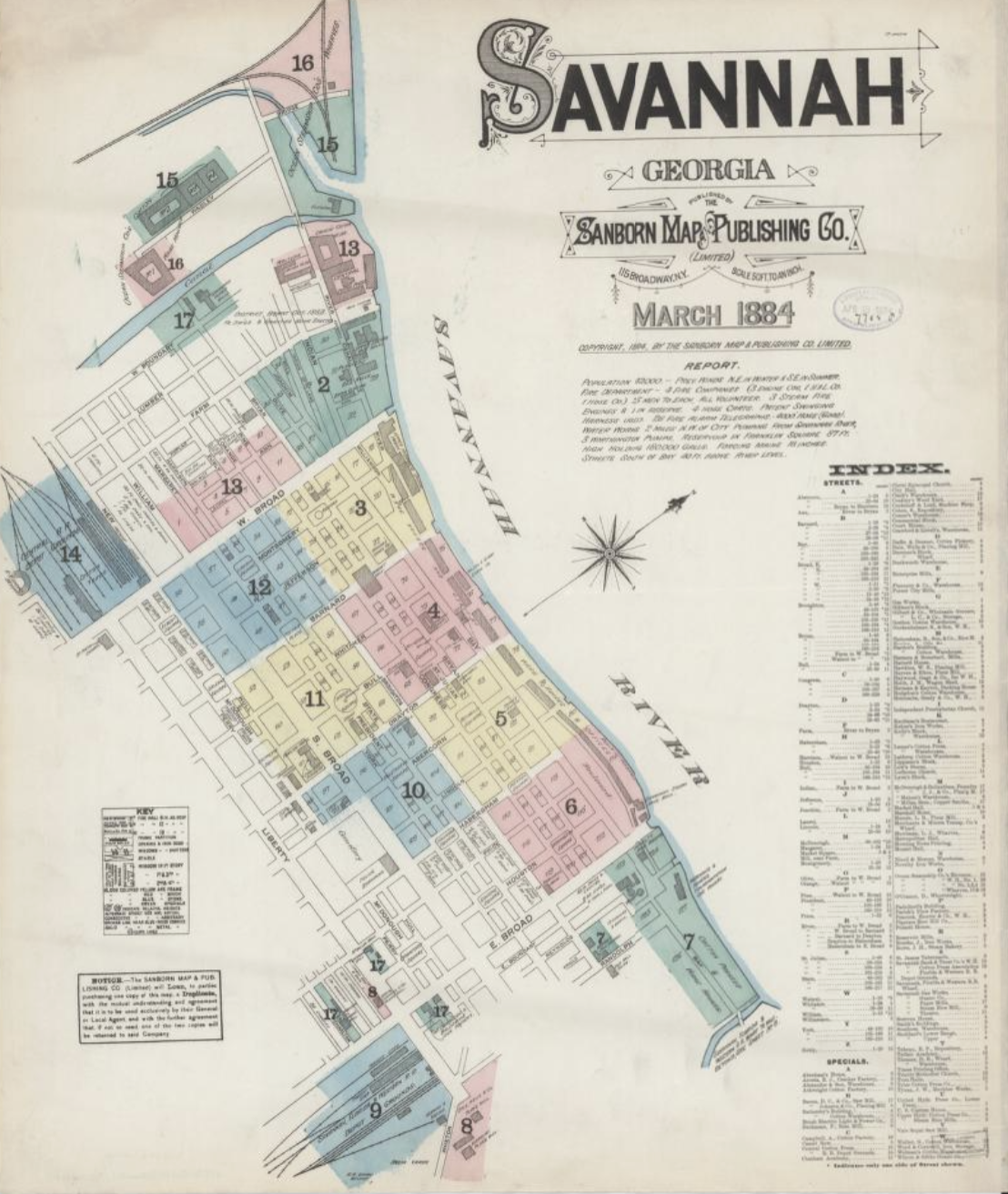
- Cover page of the 1884 edition
- Language: English
- Genre: Insurance
- Publisher: The Sanborn Map Company
- Publication date: 1884 (original)
- Publication place: United States

Sanborn Fire Insurance Maps of Savannah are a series of historic publications by The Sanborn Map Company, documenting 19th and 20th century Savannah, Georgia. It was originally published in 1884, with three subsequent editions published in 1888, 1898 and 1916. Updates were issued until 1973. They were kept relevant to the city's changing landscape. The maps show widths and names of streets, sewer systems, property boundaries, and house and block numbers.

The first three editions focused on downtown Savannah, including its then 24 squares; the fourth focused on Savannah Beach and Tybee Island.

The maps have been digitized by the Digital Library of Georgia. In 2021, five volumes of Sanborn Fire Insurance Maps of Savannah, spanning 1916 through 1973, were donated by the Chatham County–Savannah Metropolitan Planning Commission Historic Preservation Department to the Municipal Archives to ensure their preservation and continued public access.
