= Mills Lane (banker) =

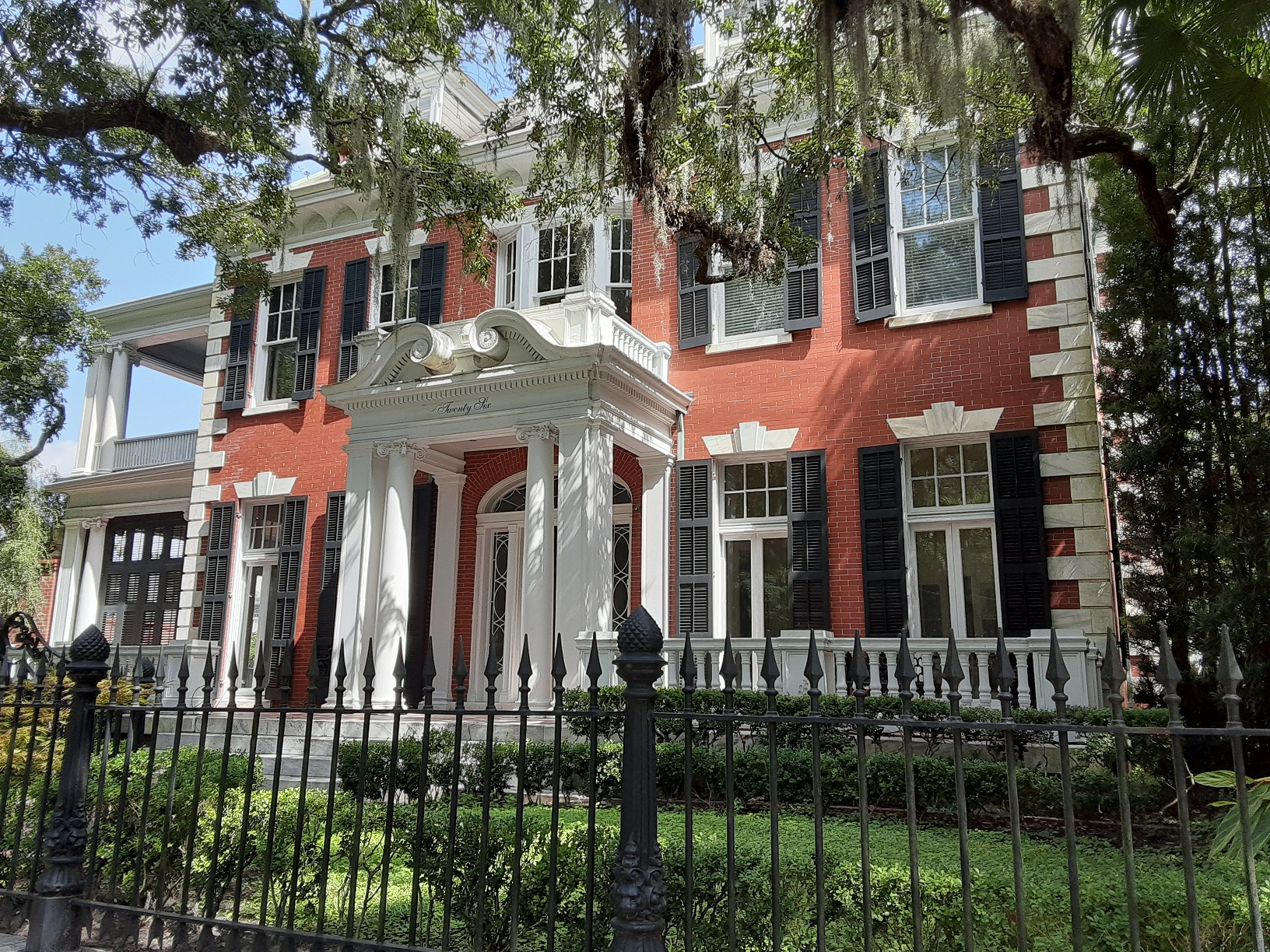
Lane's childhood home, 26 East Gaston Street in Savannah, overlooking Forsyth Park. It was completed three years before his birth

Mills Bee Lane Jr. (January 12, 1912 – May 7, 1989) was an American banker in Atlanta, Georgia.

He was born in Savannah, Georgia, and after graduating from Yale University in 1934 took a job as a clerk at a Citizens & Southern National Bank (C&S) branch in Valdosta, Georgia. The bank had been founded by Lane's father in 1906 and when the senior Lane died in 1946, Lane Jr., became the bank's president.

As president of C&S, Mills Lane funded the design and construction of mayor Ivan Allen Jr.'s dream of a new baseball stadium for the city of Atlanta. The site was a recently cleared slum, then known as Washington-Rawson, and Atlanta Stadium was completed a mere twelve months after a handshake deal between Lane and the Milwaukee Braves' owners. The rush was to ensure that the 1965 season could be played in the new stadium, but a lawsuit brought by Milwaukee, Wisconsin, delayed the start of baseball in Atlanta until April, 1966.

Lane's other famous building project was his new bank headquarters, the cylindrical C&S tower at West Peachtree and North Avenue, which was eventually demolished to make room for the western expansion of the Bank of America Plaza.

From 1951–1972, Lane partnered with Savannah landscape architect Clermont Huger Lee to renovate homes of historic significance along the northeast part of Savannah.

When Lane retired in 1973, C&S was the largest bank in the South. Lane returned to Savannah, where he remained until his death. The western extension of 52nd Street in Savannah is named Mills B. Lane Boulevard in his honor.

Lane was the uncle of boxing referee and namesake Mills Lane and the grandson of Hugh Comer.

== Personal life ==
Lane was married to Anne, with whom he had at least one child: Mills Lane IV.
