= Owens–Thomas House =

Historic house in Savannah, Georgia, US

- U.S. National Register of Historic Places
- U.S. National Historic Landmark
- U.S. National Historic Landmark District – Contributing property
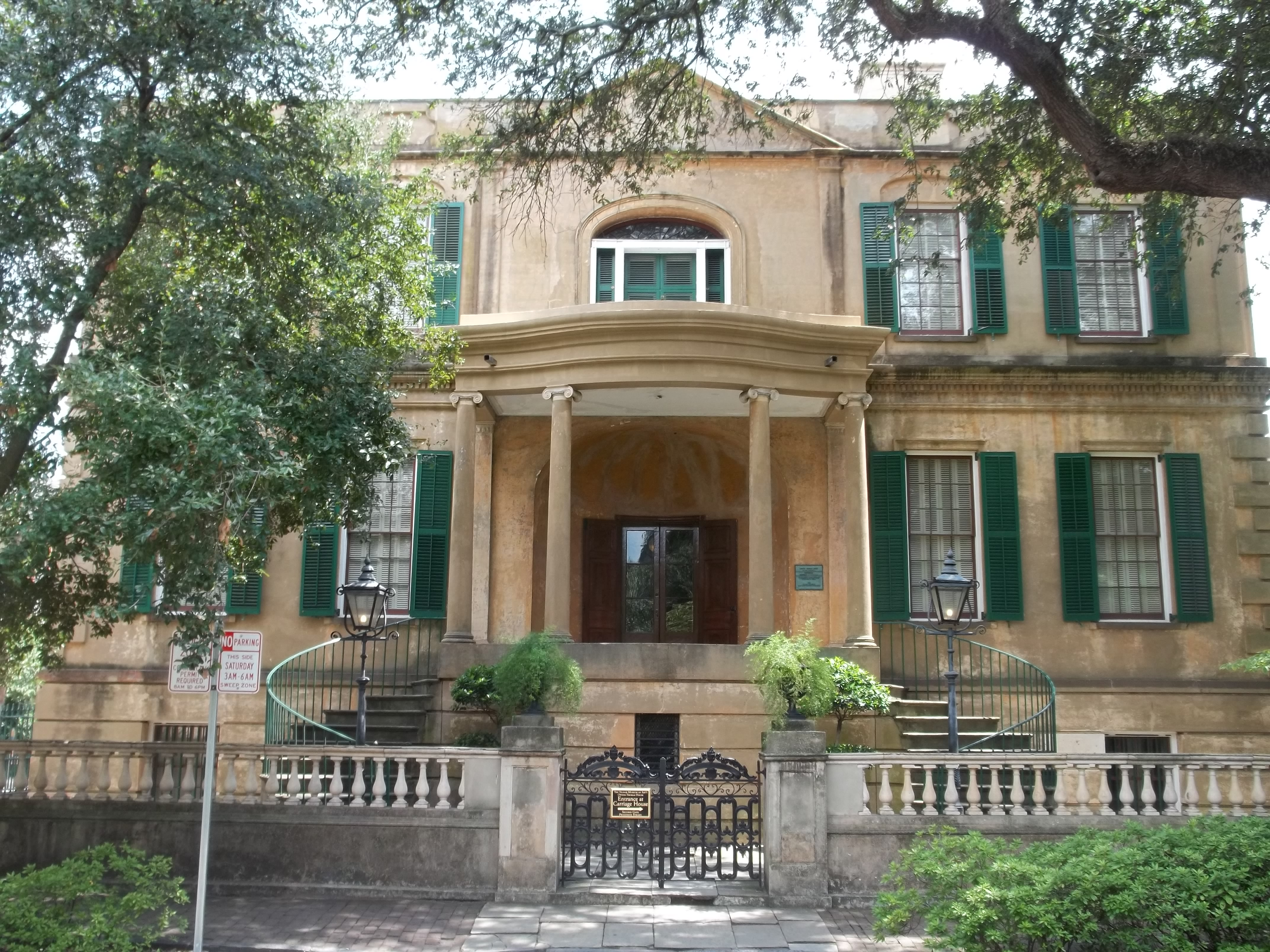
- Owen–Thomas House in 2011
- Location: 124 Abercorn Street, Oglethorpe Square; Savannah, Georgia
- Coordinates: 32.07738°N 81.08940°W
- Built: 1819 (207 years ago)
- Architect: William Jay
- Architectural style: Early Republic
- Part of: Savannah Historic District (Savannah, Georgia) (ID66000277)
- NRHP reference No.: 76000611

Significant dates
- Added to NRHP: May 11, 1976
- Designated NHL: May 11, 1976

The Owens–Thomas House & Slave Quarters (originally known as the Richardson House) is a historic home in Savannah, Georgia, that is operated as a historic house museum by Telfair Museums. It is located at 124 Abercorn Street, on the northeast corner of Oglethorpe Square. The Owens–Thomas House was designated a National Historic Landmark in 1976, as one of the nation's finest examples of English Regency architecture.

Renovations in the 1990s uncovered and restored one of the oldest and best preserved urban slave quarters in the American South.

== Architectural style and house history ==
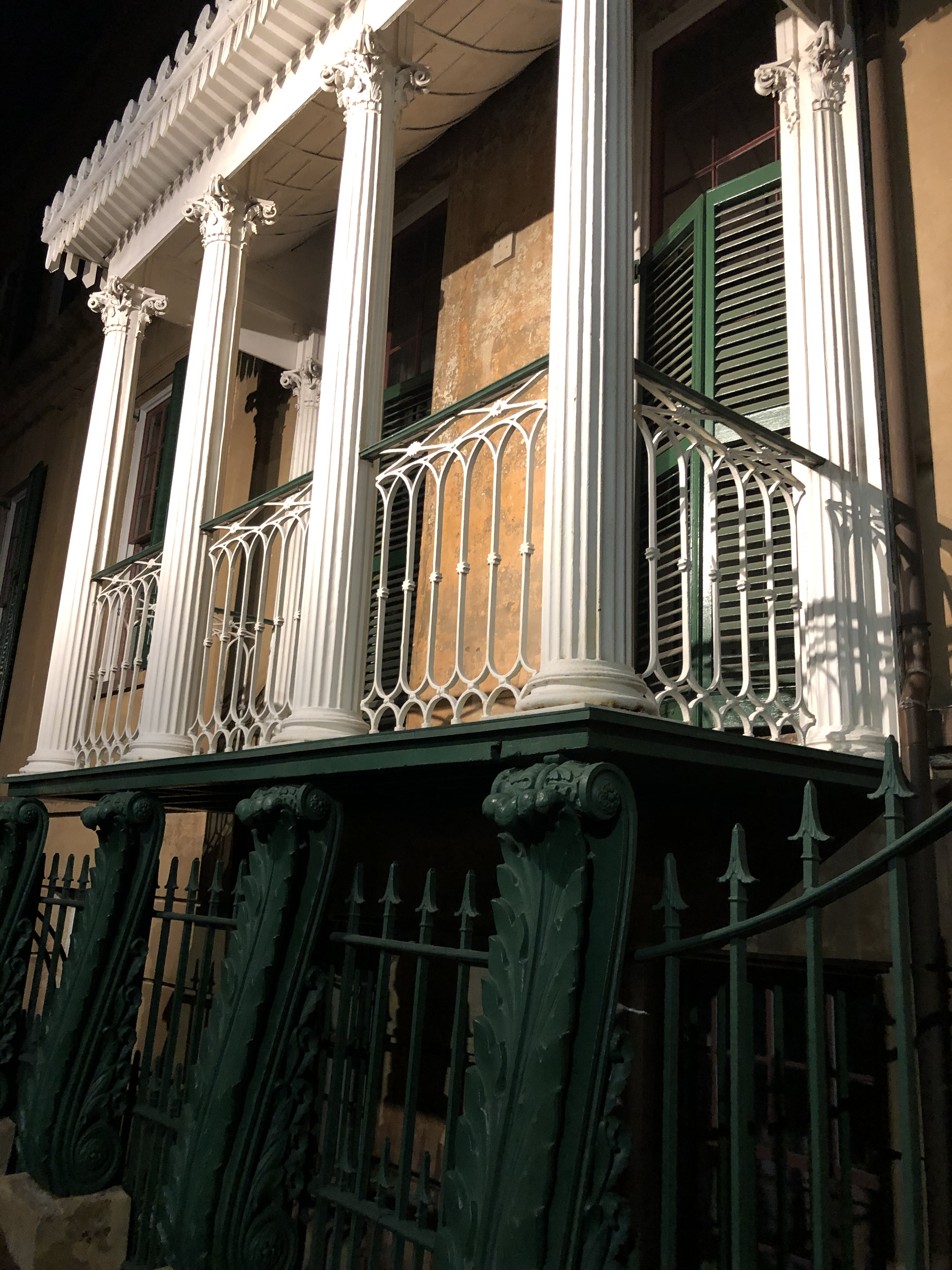
The side veranda, featuring acanthus scroll supports, from which General Lafayette addressed the citizens of Savannah on his visit in 1825

This most important and architecturally significant house was begun in 1816 and completed in 1819. Designed by the English architect William Jay of Bath, the house plans were drawn while Jay was still in England. He sent architectural elevations to local workers before his arrival in Savannah sometime after foundations were laid. According to Jay's letters, the house was to be aesthetically compatible to Bath. This is evident in the Bath stone of the house's construction as well as its sophisticated architectural detail. It was a gentrifying physical ornament to the newly successful Southern port. The Richardson House, as it was originally known—after its first owner and builder, Richard Richardson— is North America's preeminent example of period English Regency architecture.

The mansion was purchased in 1830 by local attorney and politician George Welshman Owens for $10,000 (~$329,344 in 2024). The family maintained it for several decades until Owens' granddaughter, Margaret Thomas, bequeathed the house to the Telfair Academy of Arts and Sciences (established in 1885) as the South's oldest art museum, in 1951. The house is notable for its early cast iron side veranda with elaborate acanthus scroll supports on which the Marquis de Lafayette addressed the citizens of Savannah on his visit in 1825. William Jay was architect to other Savannah landmarks such as the Scarborough house, the Telfair House as mentioned above, and an attribution to the Gordon-Low House.

== Slave quarters ==
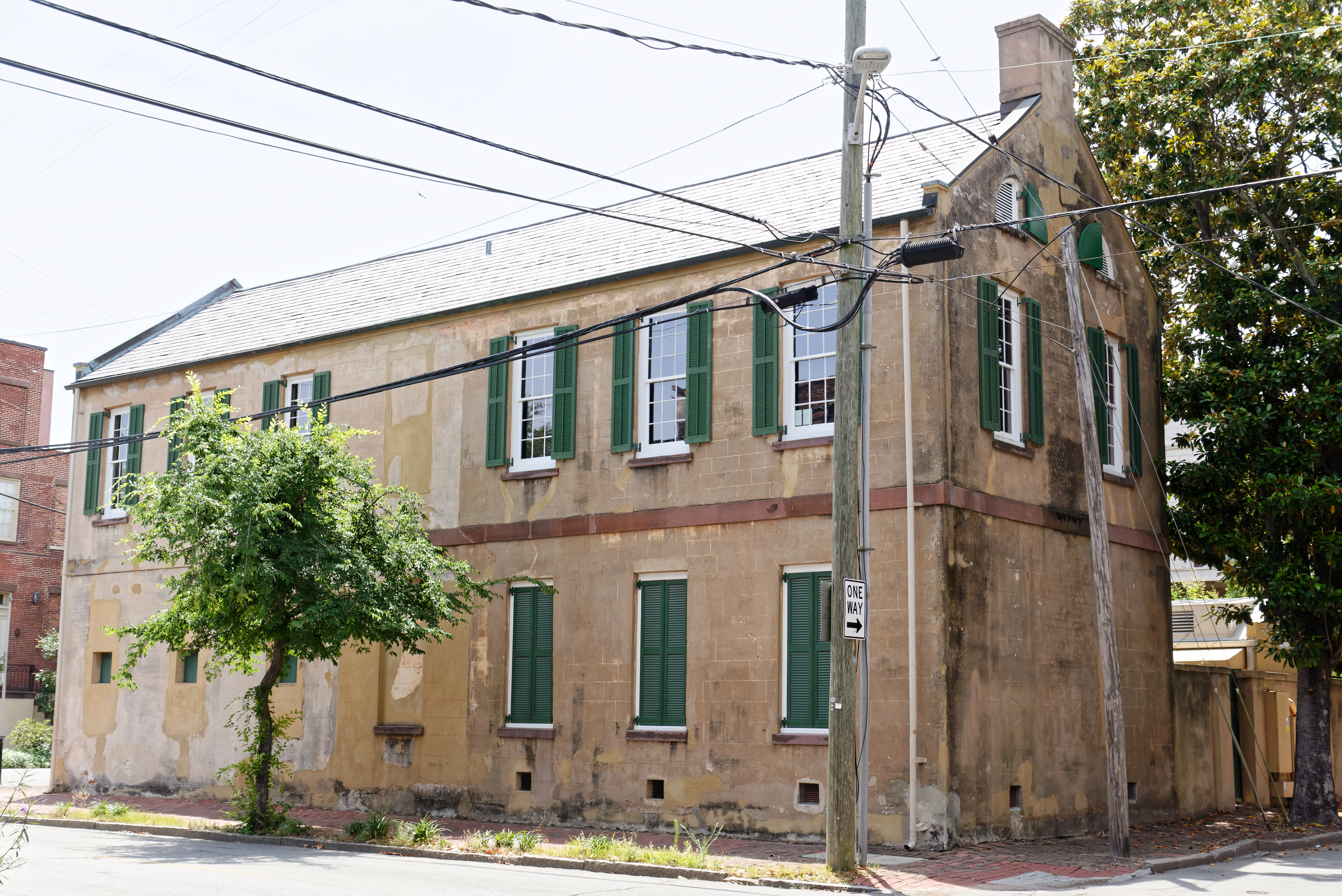
Slave quarters

A focus of tours of the site is the carriage house and the history of the enslaved workers who lived there, including the nanny, cook and butler. During a renovation of the carriage house in the 1990s, the owners of the site discovered one of the oldest and best preserved urban slave quarters in the American South. The history has been uncovered via their Slavery and Freedom Project, and via symposiums in 2008 and 2020 (planned).

The ceiling of the slave quarters is painted haint blue, which was customarily used in Gullah culture to deter ghosts or other malevolent spirits. It is notable as the largest swath of haint blue paint in North America.

The restoration includes the pantry and other elements of the Gullah cooking, and the cellar where meals and laundry were prepared.

== Museum ==
The Owens–Thomas House collection contains furnishings and decorative arts from the English Regency period; containing effects of the Owens family, most pieces dating from the years 1790 to 1840. Collections include English Georgian and American Federal period furniture, early Savannah textiles, silver, Chinese Export porcelain, and 18th- and 19th-century art. The slave quarters feature slave artifacts of the period.

The courtyard features a small parterre garden that was redesigned in 1954 by Savannah landscape architect Clermont Huger Lee. Lee designed the formal garden in 1820 English-American style and supervised maintenance of the garden for fourteen years.

== Gallery ==
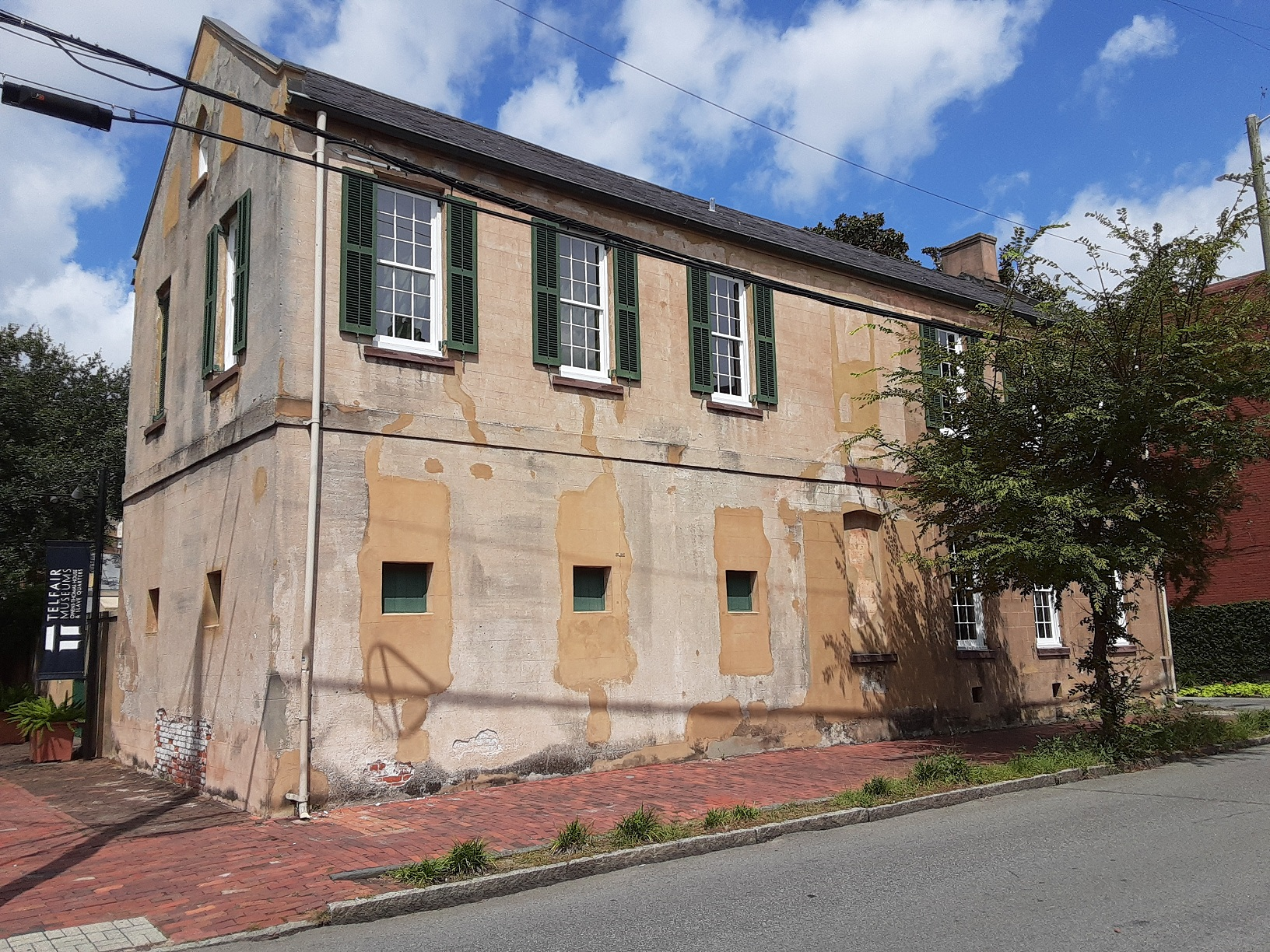
The rear of the property, on Lincoln Street, 2021

== See also ==
- List of National Historic Landmarks in Georgia (U.S. state)
- National Register of Historic Places listings in Chatham County, Georgia
- Jane Adair Wright, preservationist and curator of the house's museum
