= Mary Magdalene Marshall =

American hotelier and philanthropist

- The 1830 portrait of Marshall hanging in the lobby of The Marshall House
- Born: September 7, 1783; Savannah, Georgia, U.S.
- Died: January 26, 1877 (aged 93); Savannah, Georgia, U.S.
- Resting place: Laurel Grove Cemetery
- Occupations: Hotelier, philanthropist

Mary Magdalene Marshall (September 7, 1783 – January 26, 1877) was an American real-estate investor and philanthropist. She established The Marshall House hotel in Savannah, Georgia, and had erected in the city several notable buildings that are still standing today.

== Life and career ==
Mary Magdalene Leaver was born in 1783 to Gabriel Leaver, a cabinet-maker from London, and Mary Shick. She is believed to have been their only child, and inherited a "sizeable estate" upon their deaths.

Her father owned a large plantation three miles to the west of Savannah, and lived next door to Mordecai Sheftall on Broughton Street. He rented properties in Ewenburg.

Upon her father's death in 1795, it is believed Mary was raised by her mother and a governess, learning the art of "social graces, handiwork, etc."

On October 30, 1800, at age 17, she married 20-year-old James Marshall, of St. Augustine, Florida. Later a commander in the Savannah Volunteer Guards, he died in 1845, aged 64. He had been suffering from debilitating strokes in the period before his death.

In 1840, the Marshalls adopted a daughter and named her Margaret. She was one of a family of ten Irish children in the neighborhood. The Marshalls were living at the northwestern corner of West Broad and William Streets. Now demolished, it was described as a four-storey mansion by Joseph Frederick Waring in his book Cerveau's Savannah.

Margaret married Adalbert Ethelston Waldburgh Barclay in 1855. The Barclays lived next door to the Marshall mansion, at what became known as the Wetter House. Margaret filed for divorce from Barclay in 1859, citing "intoxication, physical abuse, and adultery." The divorce was finalized in 1862, after which Margaret took back her maiden name. She died four years later, from "paralysis of the heart", at the age of 25. They had three children, but only one, Mary Marshall Barclay (born in 1858), survived beyond infancy. Barclay survived his ex-wife by 21 years. He is interred in Manhattan.

In her later years, Mary Magdalene Marshall appointed Dr. James Johnston Waring, a family friend and grandfather of the aforementioned Joseph Frederick Waring, as codicil to her will, making him a trustee of her estate and guardian of her granddaughter.

Mary Barclay married Charles Champe Taliaferro in 1881. She died in 1893, leaving three children.

In 1888, female orphans were moved from an asylum supported by Marshall into the Wetter House.

=== Selected Marshall properties ===
The Marshall House, on today's East Broughton Street, was completed in 1852.

The Mary Marshall Row on East Oglethorpe Avenue was completed in 1856. It stands opposite Colonial Park Cemetery.

These were followed by the Mary Marshall Houses, in the southwestern civic block of Oglethorpe Square, in 1859. She used them as rental properties.

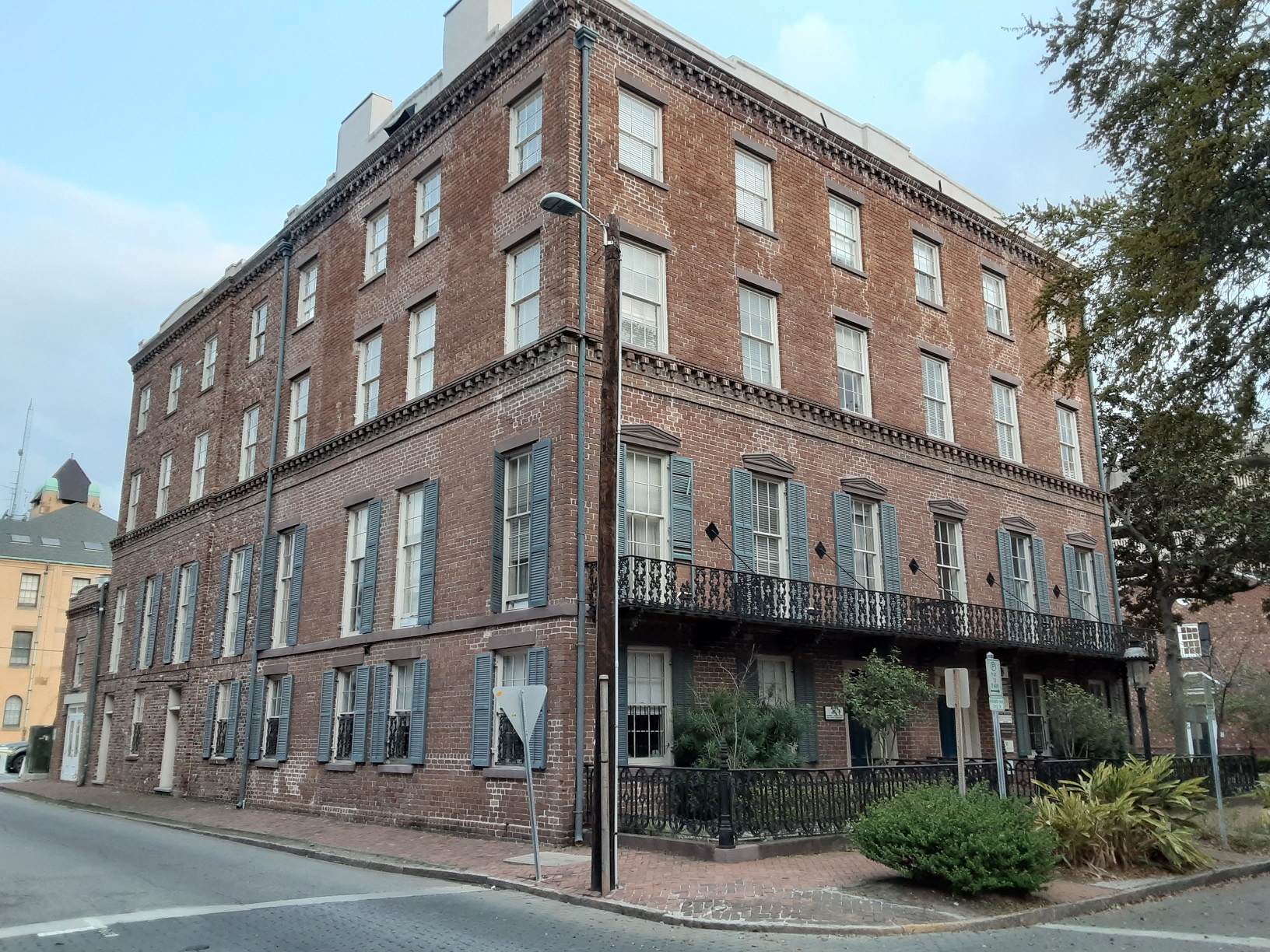
Mary Marshall Houses, Oglethorpe Square

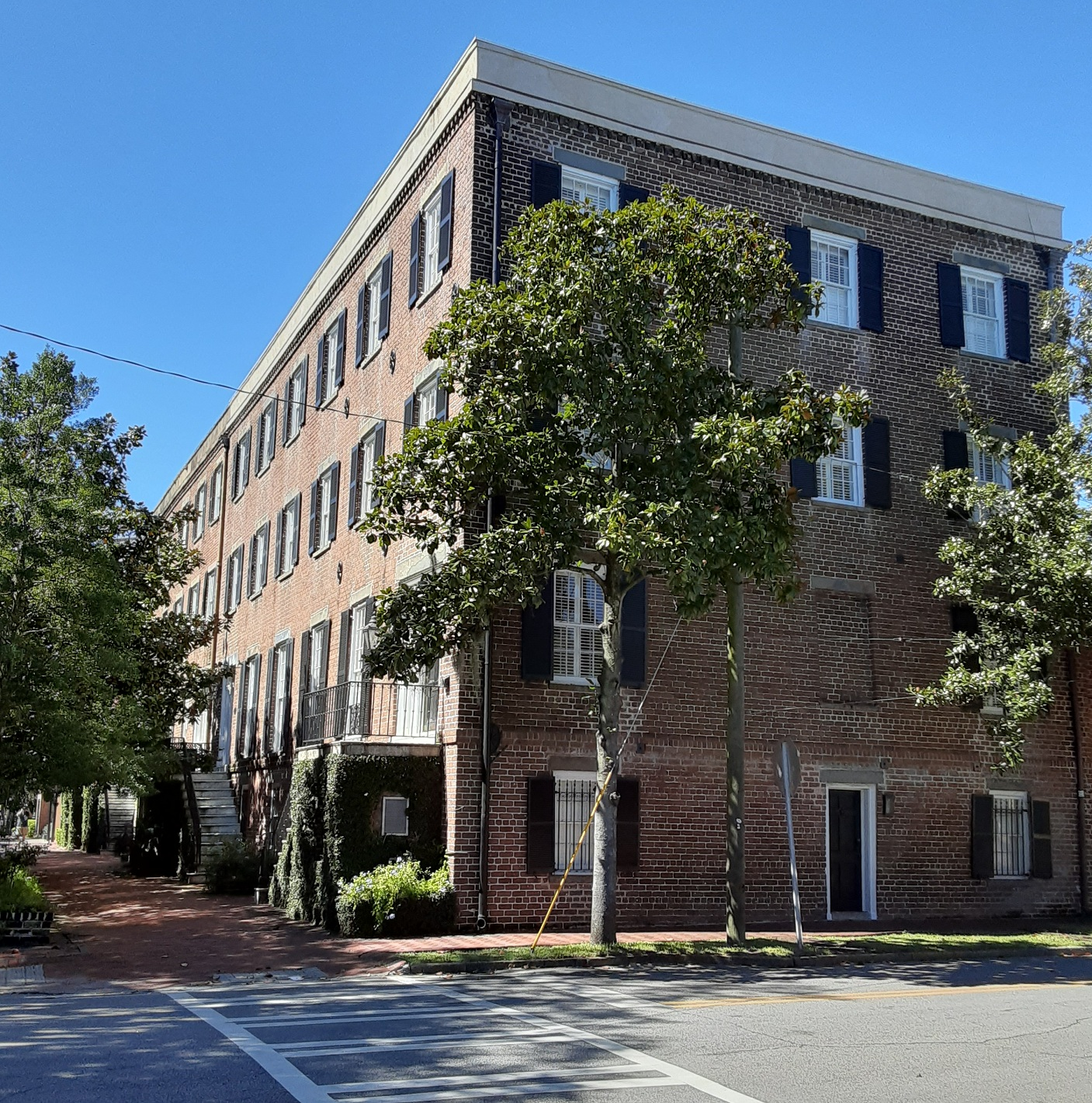
Mary Marshall Row, East Oglethorpe Avenue

Mary Marshall and her estate leased and collected rents from The Marshall House until 1914.

== Death and legacy ==
Marshall died in 1877 in Savannah. She was 93. According to the Savannah Morning News, she had no sickness or disease, but "passed away gradually and imperceptibly, growing weaker and weaker from day to day during the past week until she sank to sleep."

She is buried in Laurel Grove Cemetery, alongside her husband and daughter. Her parents are also interred there.
