= James Mills House =

Historic house in Savannah, Georgia

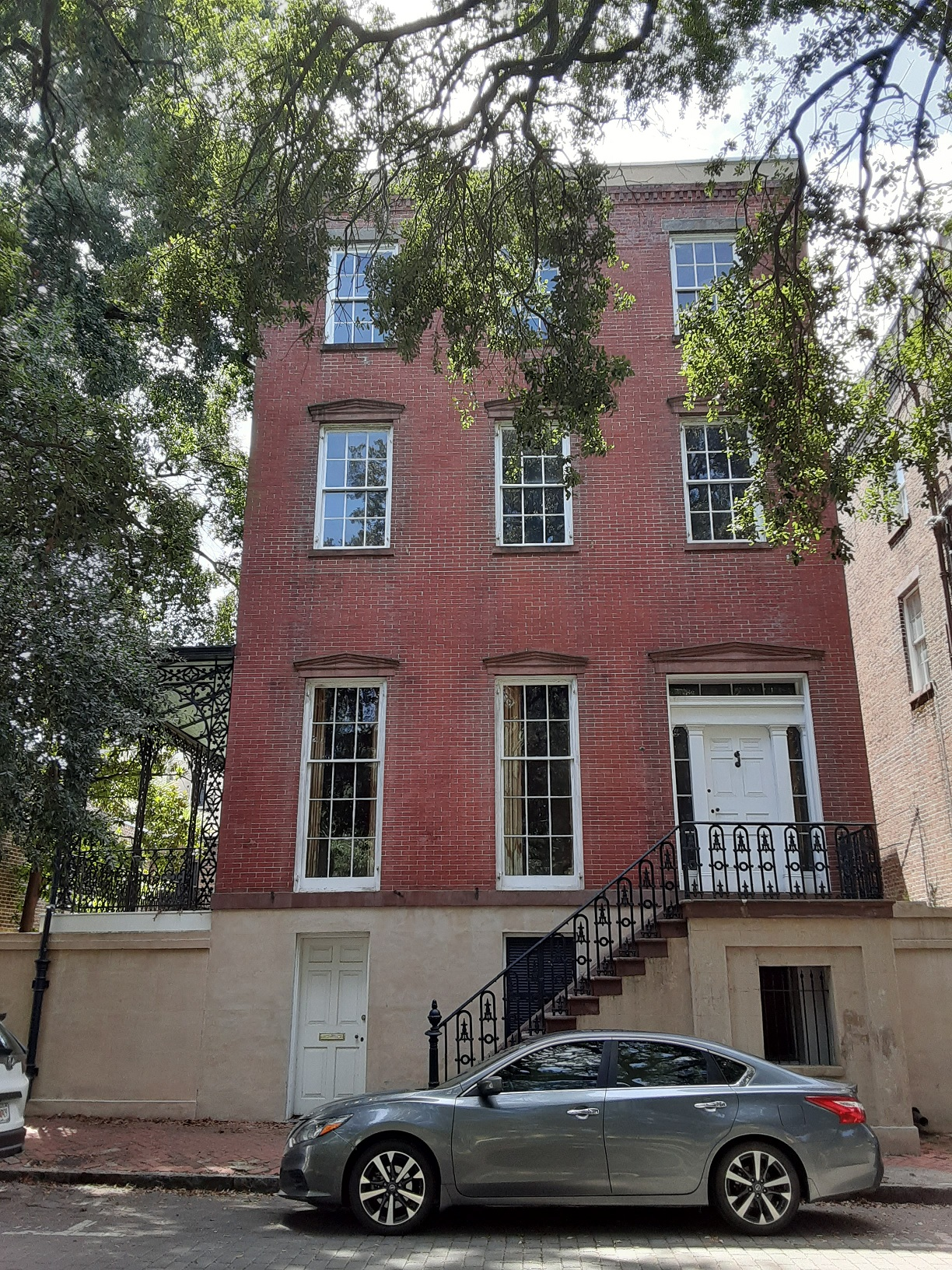
- The building in 2021
- Interactive map of the James Mills House area

General information
- Location: Savannah, Georgia, U.S., 205 East York Street
- Coordinates: 32.07679°N 81.08989°W
- Completed: 1855 (171 years ago)

Technical details
- Floor count: 3

The James Mills House is a home in Savannah, Georgia, United States. It is located in the southeastern tything block of Oglethorpe Square and was built in 1855. It is part of the Savannah Historic District, and was built for James G. Mills, a commission merchant and factor. As of 1860, his office was at 200 Bay Street.

Historic Savannah Foundation saved the property from demolition around a century after its construction. In a survey for the foundation, Mary Lane Morrison found the building to be of significant status.

It is a detached sidehall townhouse, as is its neighbor to the west at 201–203 East York Street. It has a piazza on its eastern side.

== See also ==
- Buildings in Savannah Historic District
