= The Marshall House (Savannah, Georgia) =

Building in Georgia, United States

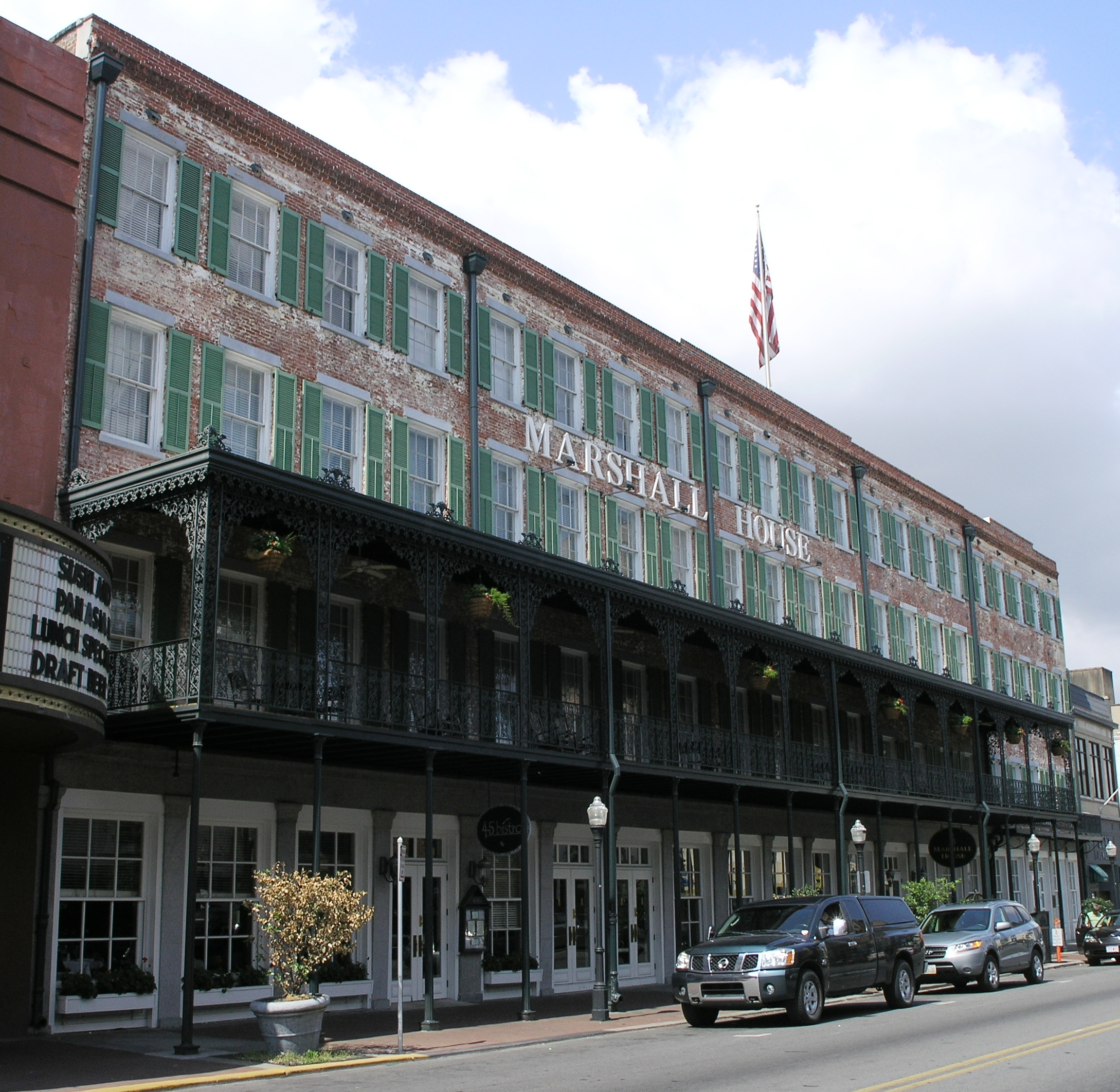
- 2007
- Former names: Geiger Hotel

General information
- Location: 123 East Broughton Street, Savannah, Georgia, United States
- Coordinates: 32.078425°N 81.090557°W
- Completed: 1852 (174 years ago)
- Owner: HLC Hotels, Inc.

Technical details
- Floor count: 4

The Marshall House is a historic building in Savannah, Georgia, United States. Located on East Broughton Street, it is the city's oldest operating hotel today, owned by Savannah's HLC Hotels, Inc., which also owns the city's Olde Harbour Inn, the Eliza Thompson House, the East Bay Inn, the Gastonian and the Kehoe House. The building was occupied by the Union Army in 1864 and 1865 during the American Civil War.

== History ==
It was opened in 1852 by Mary Magdalene Marshall as one of Savannah's first hotels, built thirty years after the City Hotel, the city's first.

Ralph Meldrim was proprietor of the Marshall House in 1857, and he erected a 12-foot-high, 120-foot in length iron veranda on the front of the second floor of the property.

A decade later, the Marshall Hose Company, a volunteer fire department, was founded to protect the property, and others, in Savannah.

The Florida House, an adjoining property, became part of the Marshall House in 1880.

The hotel closed between 1895 and 1899. When it reopened, electric lights and hot and cold plumbing was installed on every floor. Joel Chandler Harris, author of the Uncle Remus series, was a resident at the property around this time.

Mary Marshall's estate collected rent on the property until 1914.

In 1933, Herbert W. Gilbert, a Jacksonville native, leased the building and changed its name to the Gilbert Hotel.

Gilbert sold the hotel in 1941, at which point it had a lobby, dining room, living room, reading room, 66 guest rooms, one suite, an apartment and six storage rooms.

The property was named the Geiger Hotel for a period.

The Marshall House closed in 1957 due to an economic downturn. The upper three floors were abandoned, but the ground floor was used by shopkeepers up until 1998. The building was restored the following year and reopened to the public as Savannah's oldest hotel.

A bronze plaque to the left of the main entrance denotes the site as the former home of The Georgia Gazette, the first publication in colonial Georgia.

== Architecture and art ==
Original parts of the building include the Philadelphia pressed brick on the exterior, the Savannah grey brick throughout, its staircases, wooden floors, fireplaces and the doors to each guest room. Several claw-foot baths date to 1880. The veranda and gas lights were reproduced in the likeness of the originals.

An 1830 portrait of Mary Marshall, who died in 1877 at the age of 93, is hanging in the lobby after it was acquired from the estate of Jim Williams, the central figure in John Berendt's non-fiction novel Midnight in the Garden of Good and Evil.

== In popular culture ==
The hotel has a reputation of being haunted.

== Gallery ==
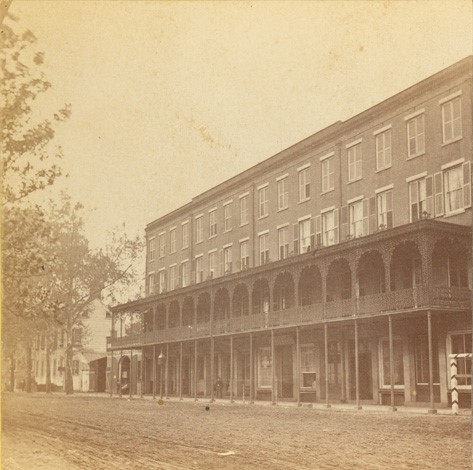
The Marshall House in the late 19th century

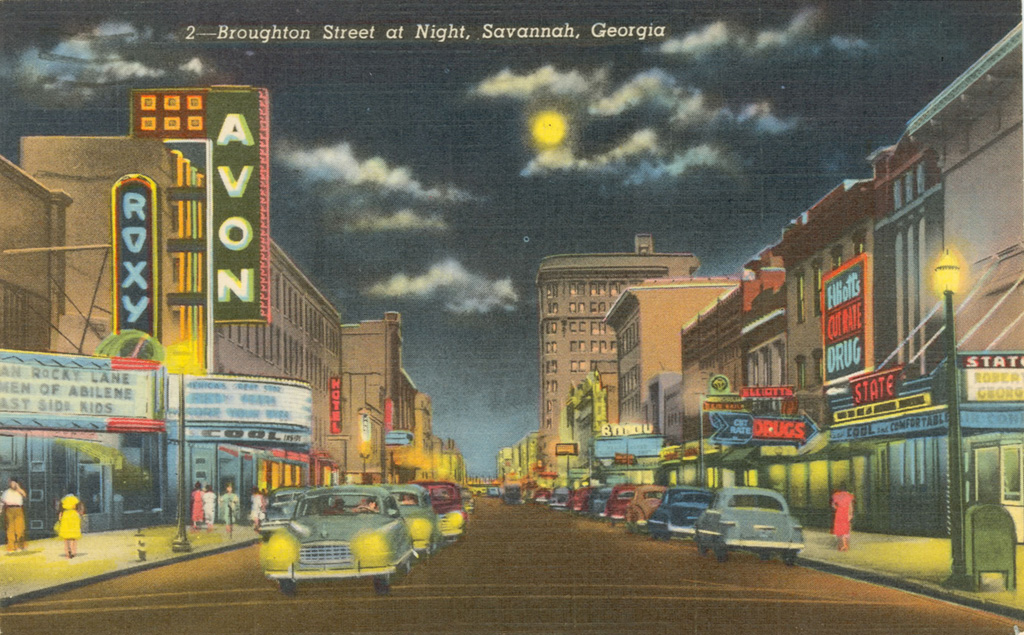
The Marshall House shown adjacent to the Avon Theatre in a 1952 postcard

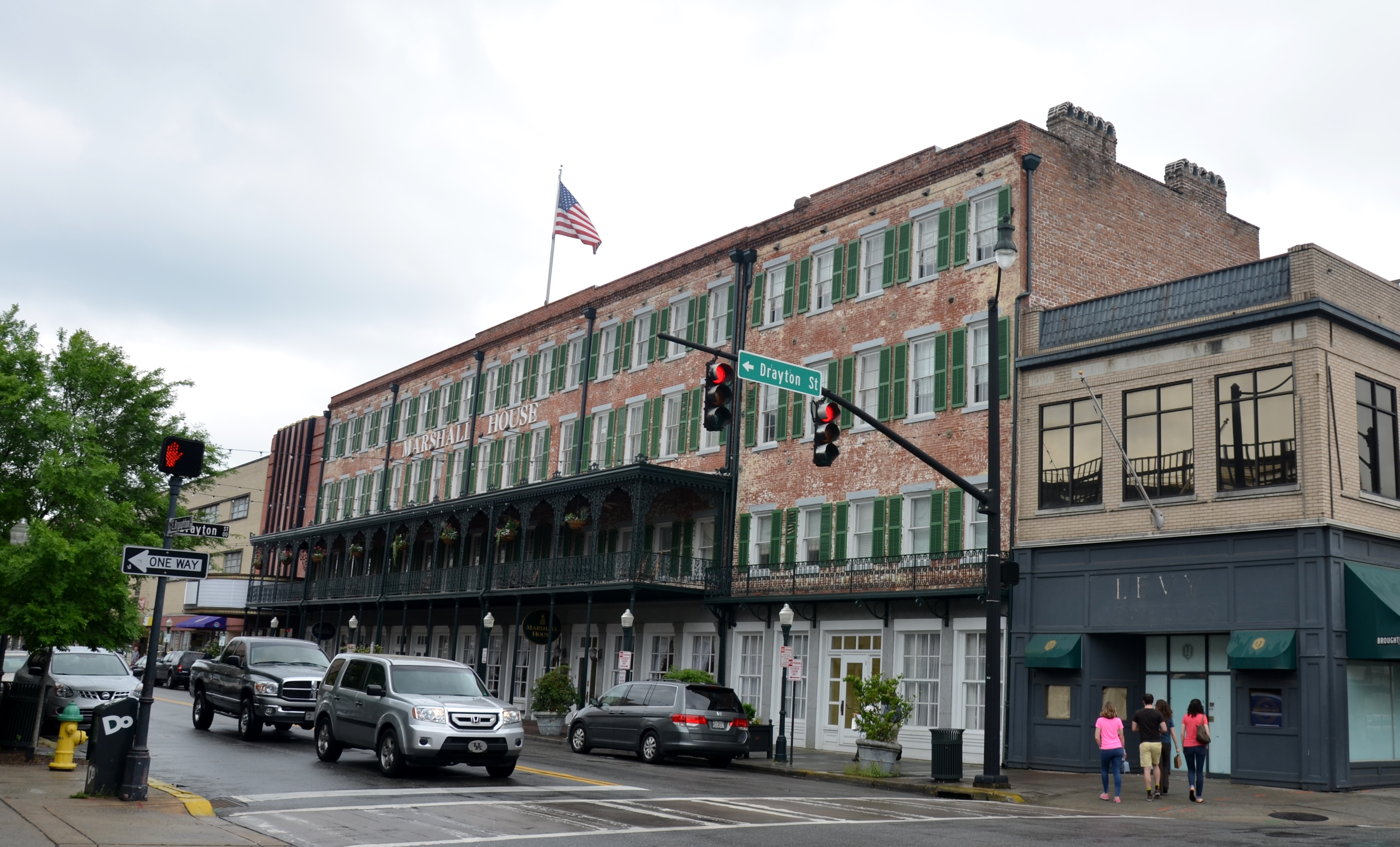
Viewed from the East Broughton and Drayton Street intersection (2015)

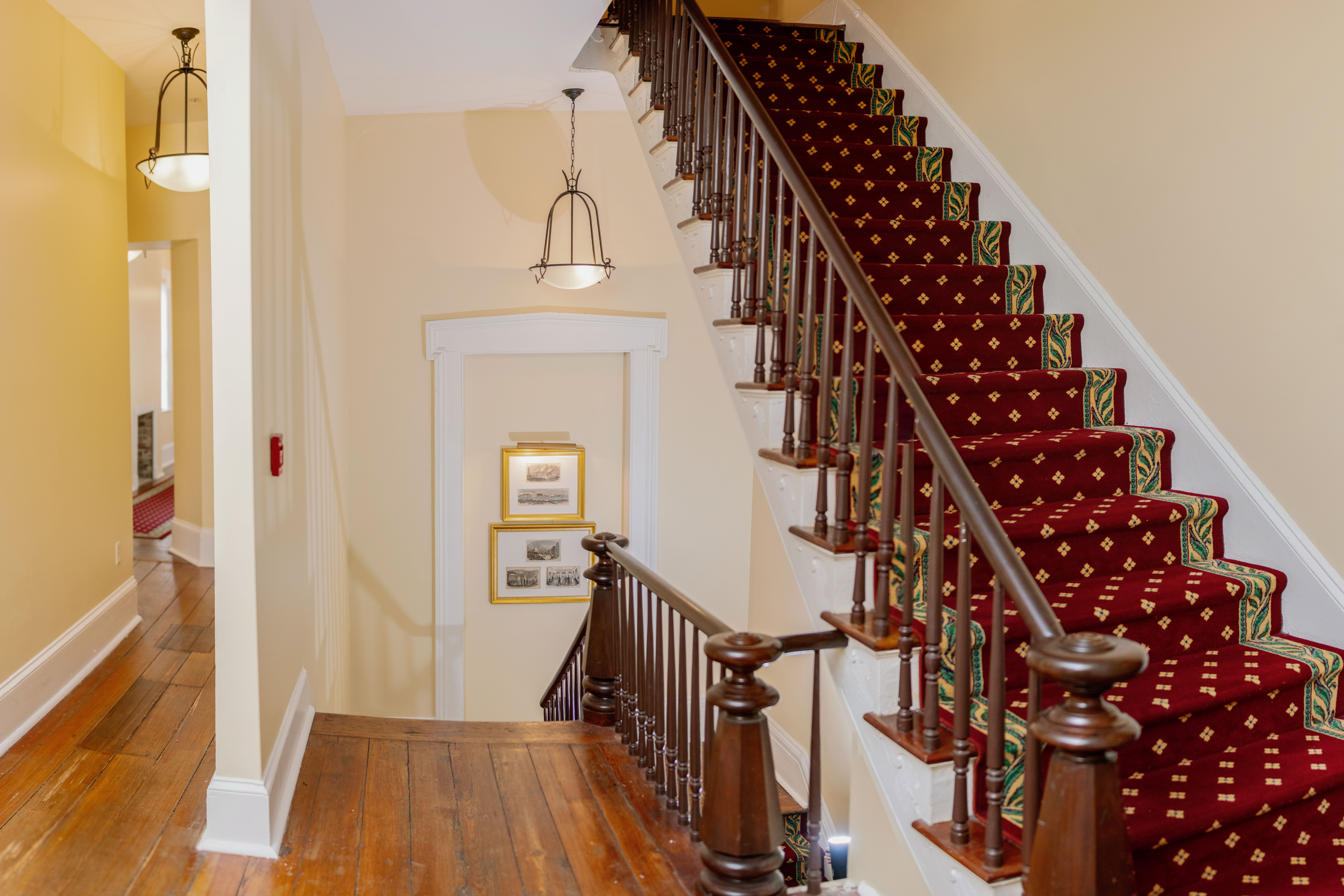
The interior (2022)

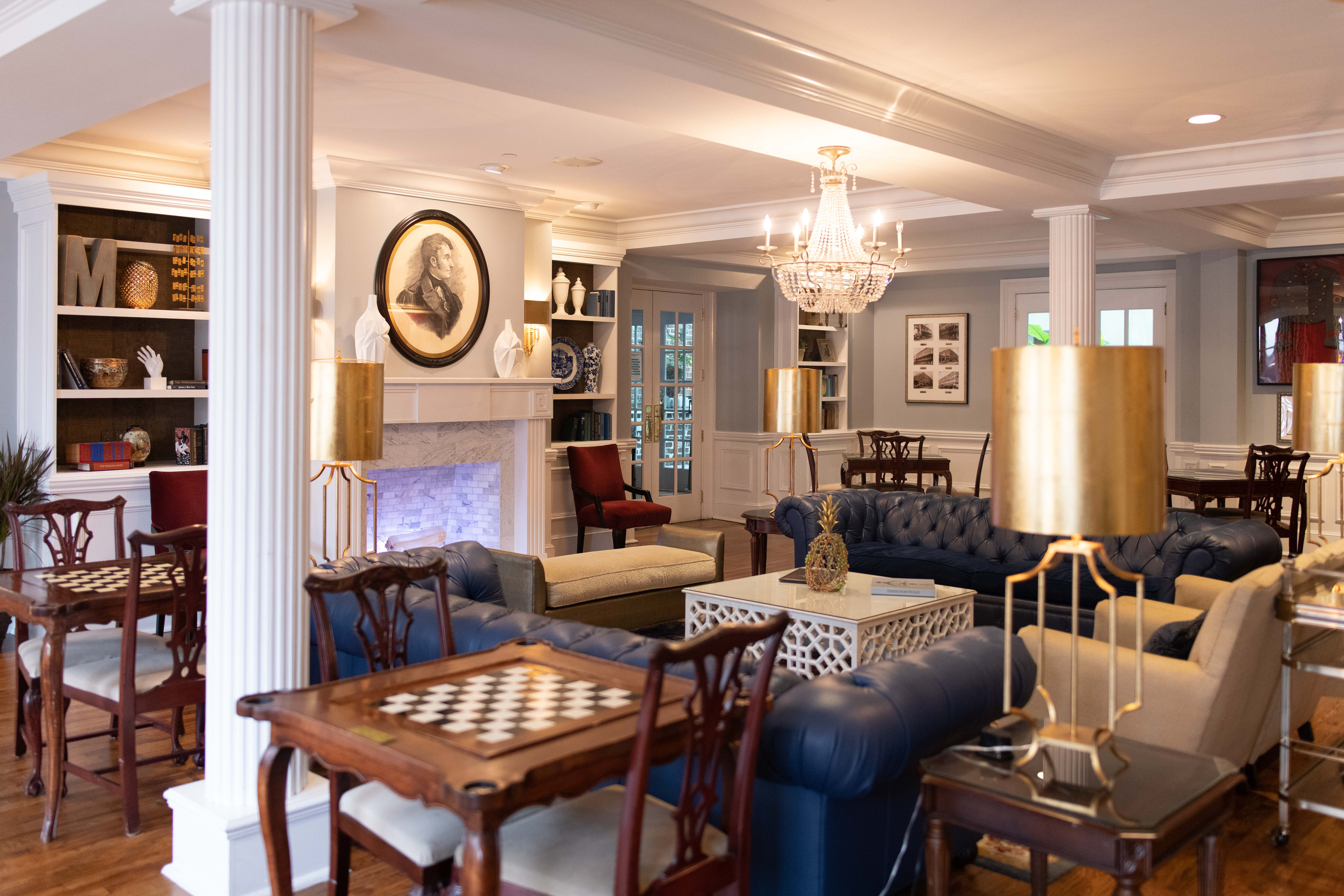
Lobby (2022)

== See also ==
- List of historic houses and buildings in Savannah, Georgia
- Mary Marshall Houses
