= Mary Marshall Houses =

Historic house in Savannah, Georgia

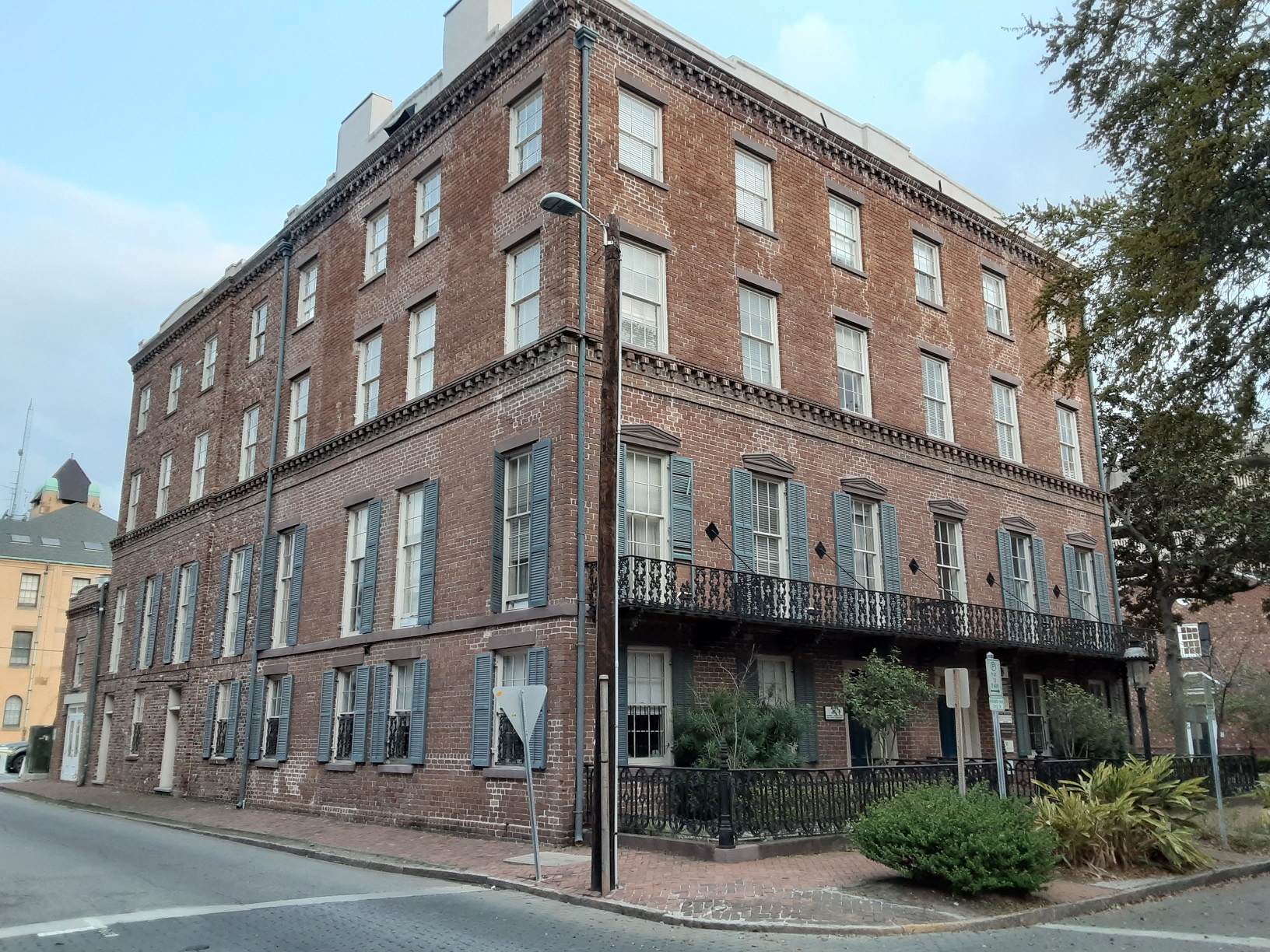
- The building in 2022
- Interactive map of the Mary Marshall Houses area

General information
- Location: Savannah, Georgia, U.S., 127–129 Abercorn Street
- Coordinates: 32.077349647°N 81.09071810°W
- Completed: c. 1840 (186 years ago)

Technical details
- Floor count: 4

The Mary Marshall Houses is a duplex building in Savannah, Georgia, United States. It is located in the southwestern civic block of Oglethorpe Square and was built in the 1840s as rental property for Mary Marshall. It is part of the Savannah Historic District.

A structure on the same lot, but which faced onto East President Street, is visible in Historic American Buildings Survey photographs taken in the mid-20th century. This building was later demolished, after which the rears of today's duplex were extended.

In a survey for the Historic Savannah Foundation, Mary Lane Morrison found the building to be of significant status. In 1964, Walter C. Hartridge wrote: "This trust lot, which is bounded by Abercorn and Drayton Streets, contains two buildings that are among the finest structures of the Greek Revival period in the United States. Hartridge also stated, incorrectly, that the property was designed by Charles B. Cluskey, although he could have been responsible for its early form that was later expanded upon.

== Architectural detail ==
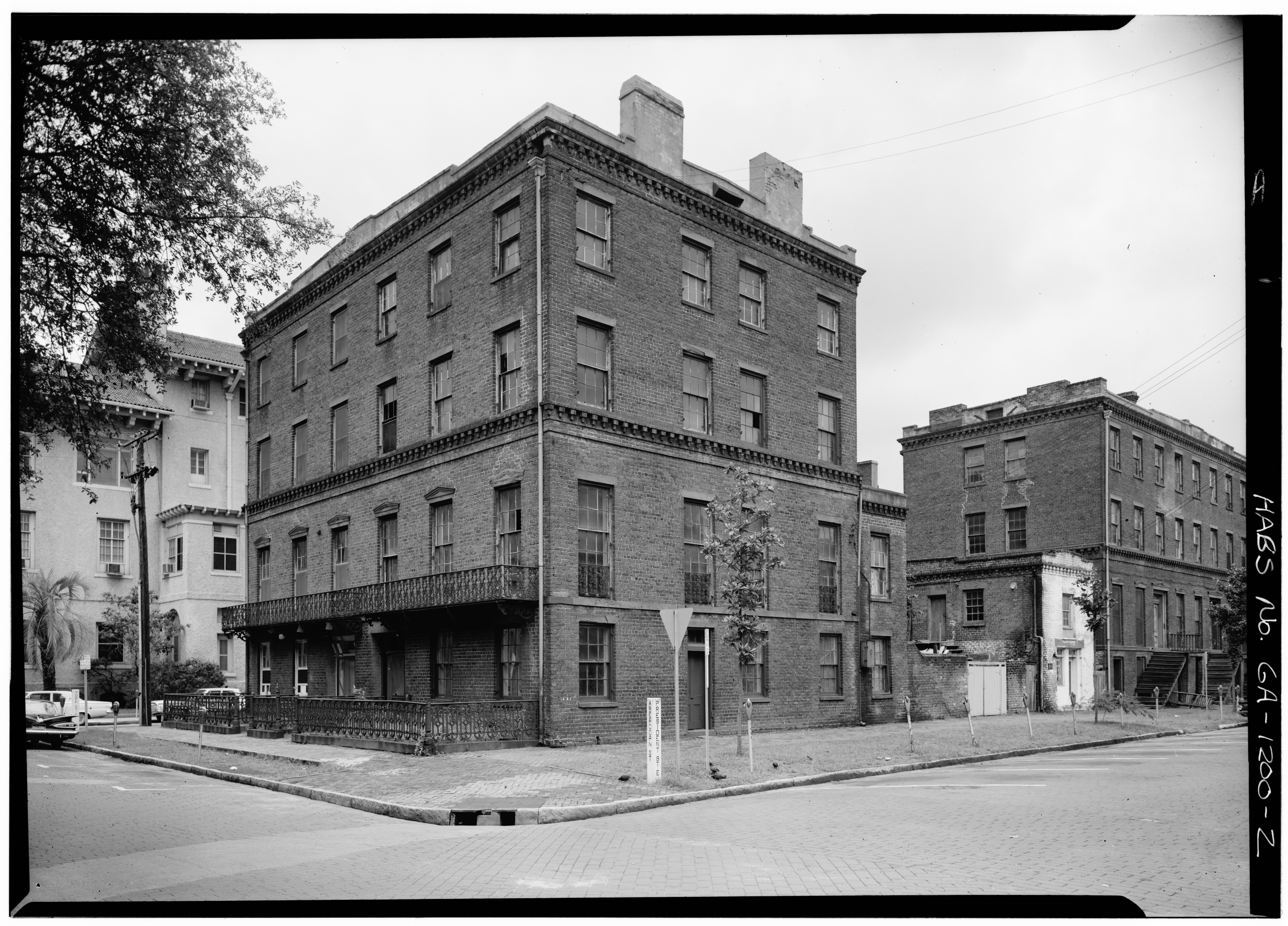

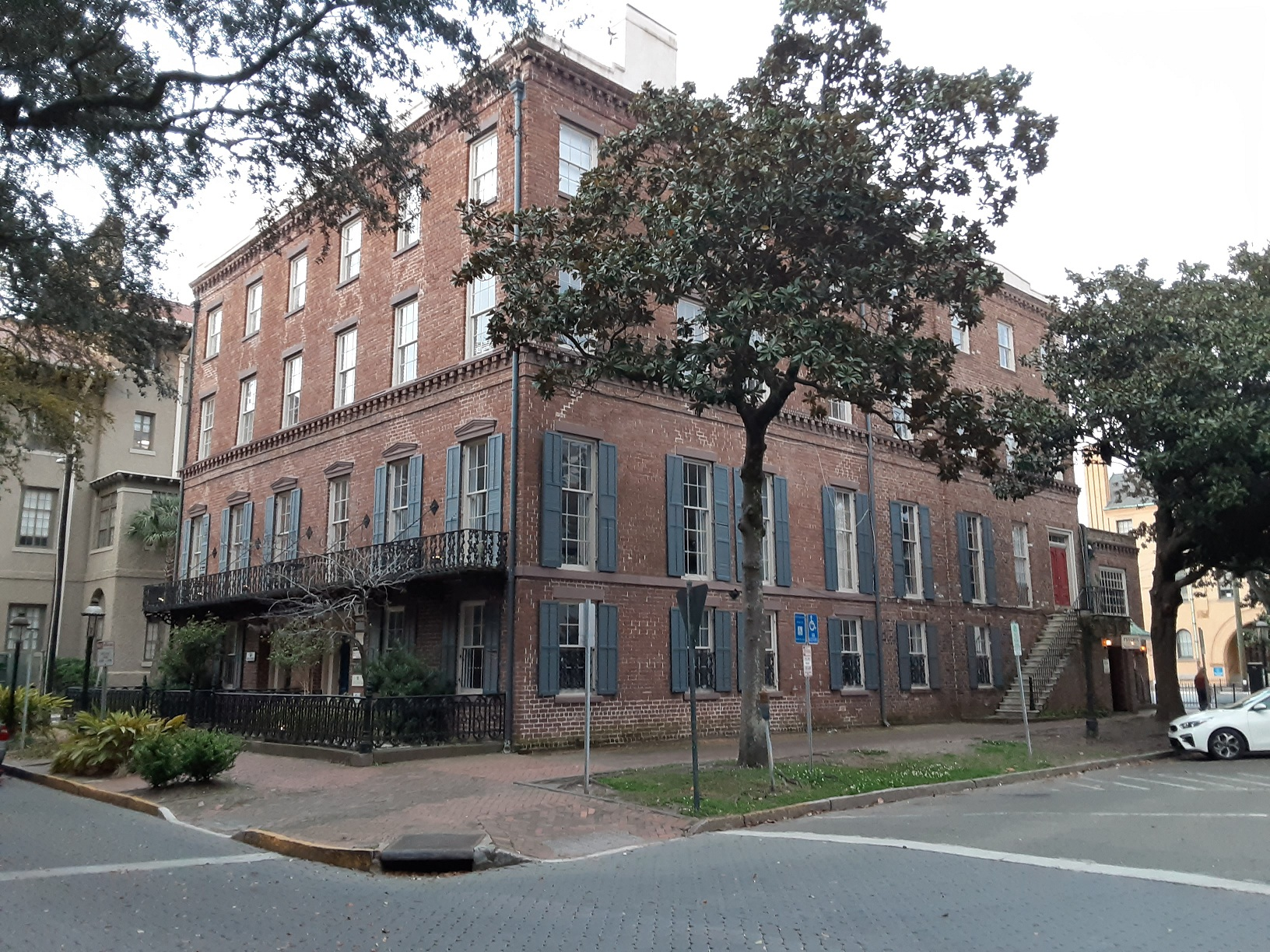

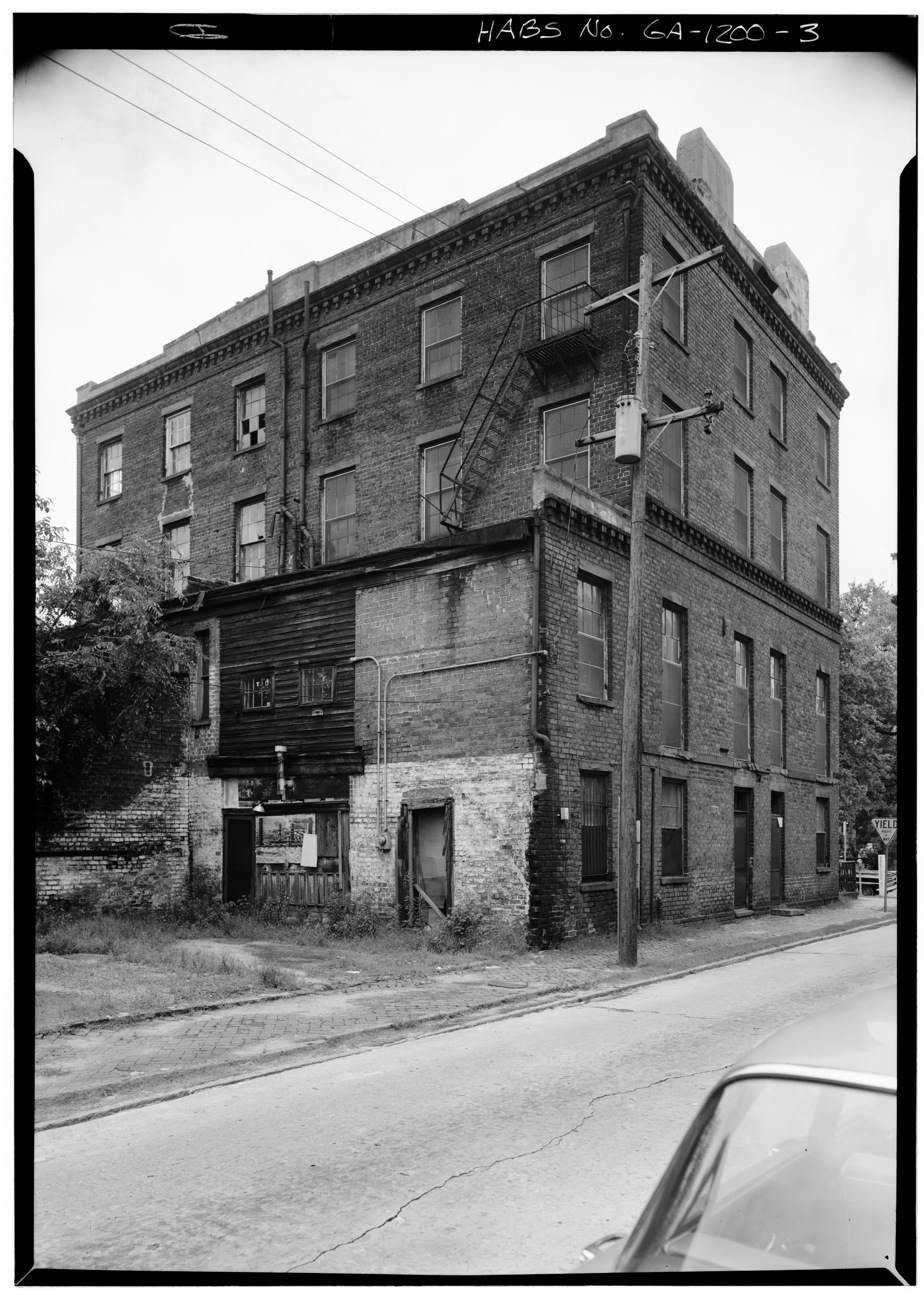

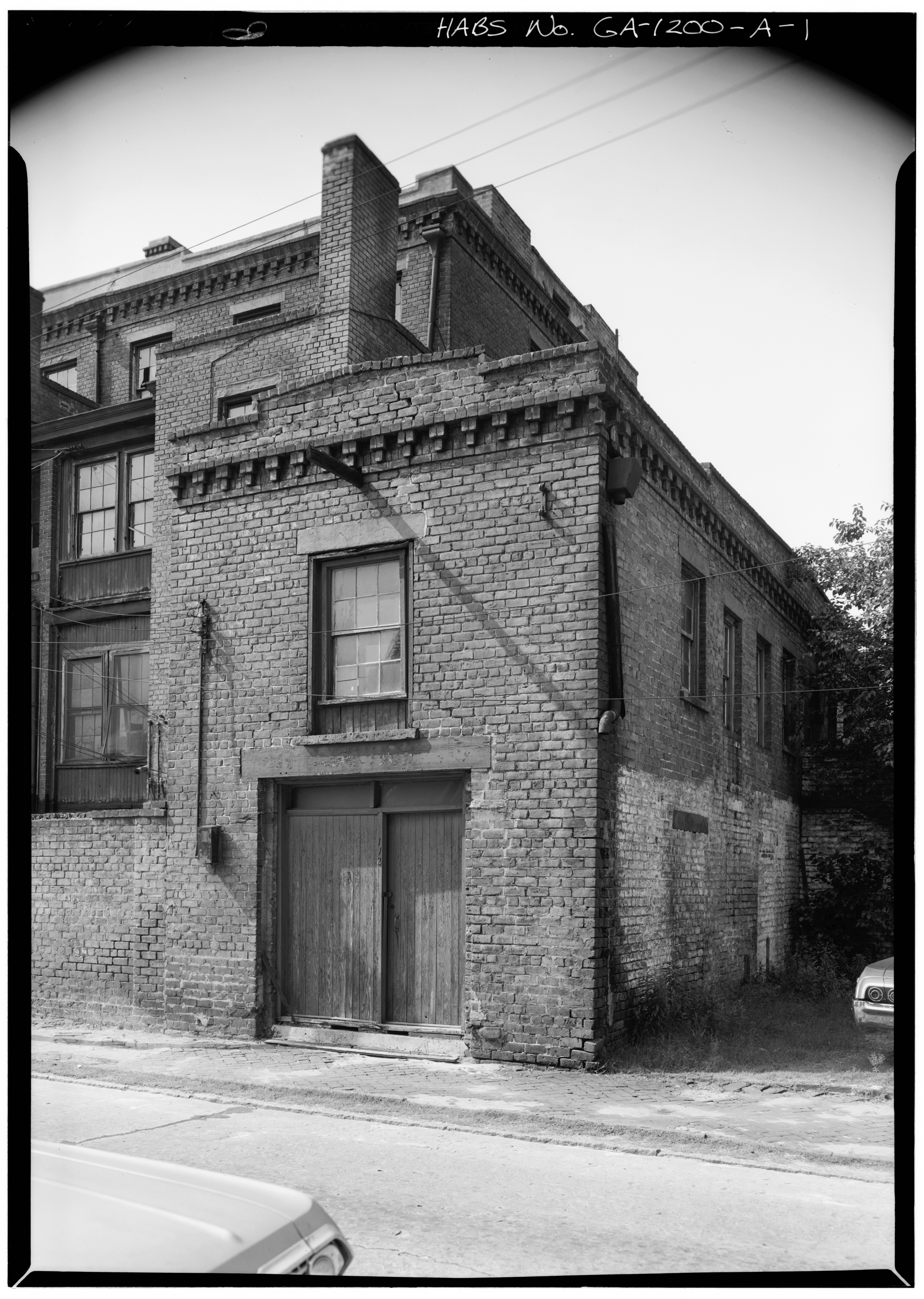

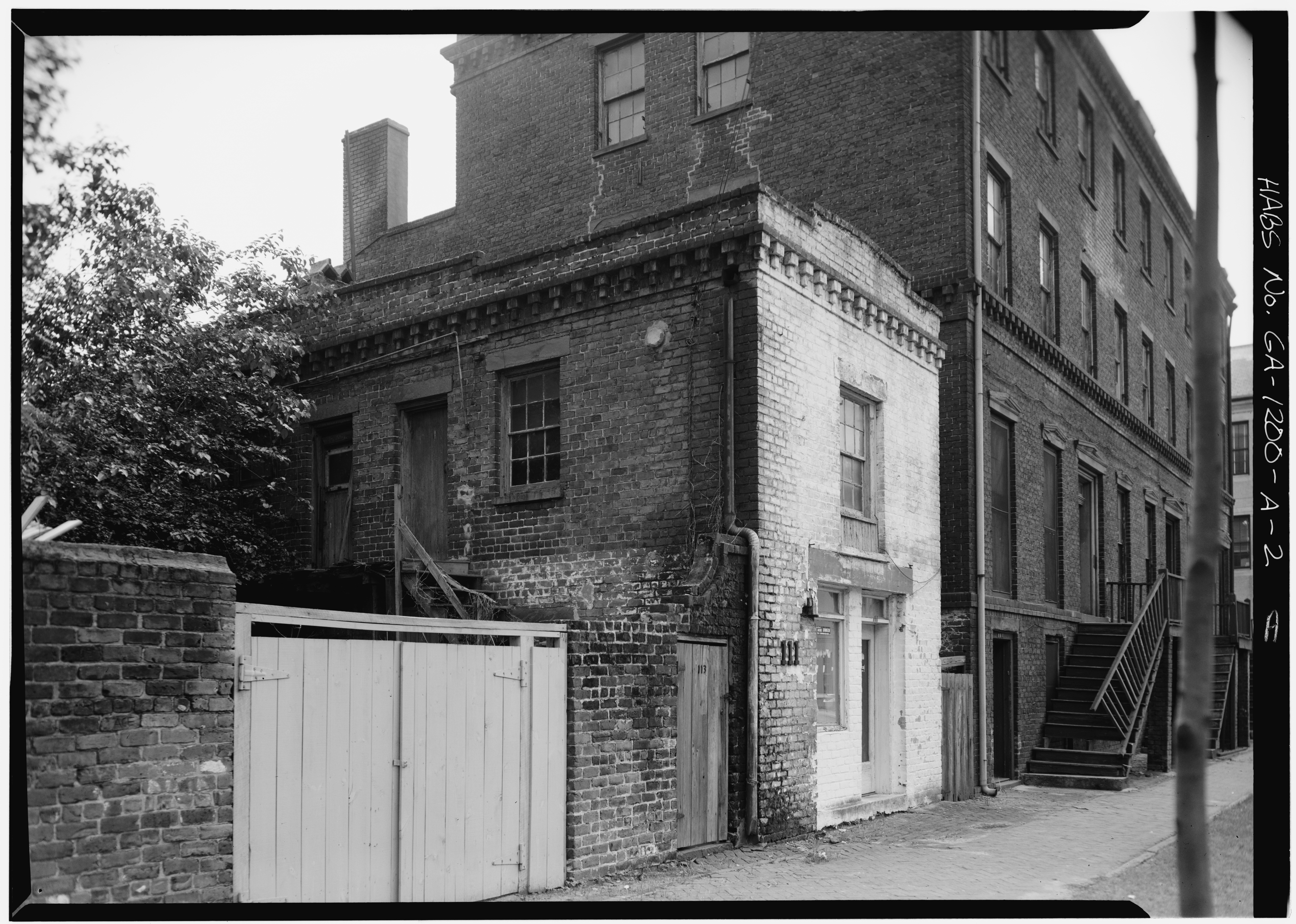

== See also ==
- Buildings in Savannah Historic District
- The Marshall House
