= Oglethorpe Square (Savannah, Georgia) =

Public square in Savannah, Georgia

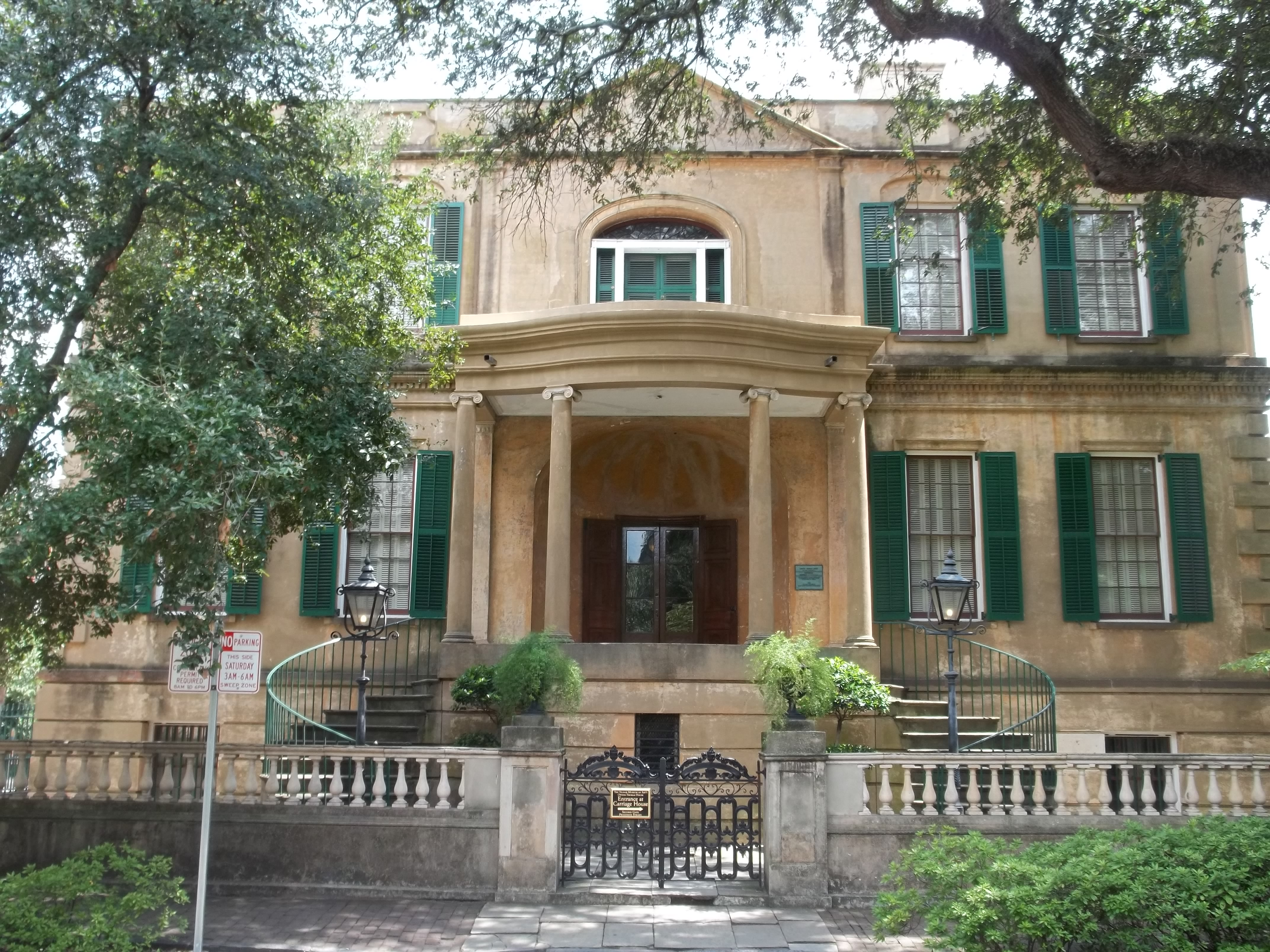
- The Owens–Thomas House stands on the eastern side of the square
- Interactive map of Oglethorpe Square
- Former name: Upper New Square
- Namesake: James Oglethorpe
- Maintained by: City of Savannah
- Location: Savannah, Georgia, U.S.
- Coordinates: 32.0773°N 81.0901°W
- North: Abercorn Street
- East: East President Street
- South: Abercorn Street
- West: East President Street

Construction
- Completion: 1742 (284 years ago)

Oglethorpe Square is one of the 22 squares of Savannah, Georgia, United States. It is located in the second row of the city's five rows of squares, on Abercorn Street and East President Street, and was laid out in 1742. It is south of Reynolds Square, west of Columbia Square, north of Colonial Park Cemetery and east of Wright Square. The oldest building on the square is the Owens–Thomas House, at 124 Abercorn Street, which dates 1819.

Upper New Square, as it was originally known, was laid out in 1742 and was later renamed in honor of Georgia founder General James Oglethorpe, although his statue is located in Chippewa Square, to the southwest.

The home of Georgia's first Royal Governor, John Reynolds, was located on the southeastern trust lot (now a parking lot of The Presidents' Quarters Inn) overlooking the square. Reynolds arrived in Savannah on October 29, 1754.

The residences of the Royal Surveyors of Georgia and South Carolina were located on the northeastern trust lots, the site of today's Owens–Thomas House. The Presidents' Quarters Inn, a 16-room historic bed and breakfast, is located in the southeastern trust lot.

The square contains a pedestal honoring Moravian missionaries who arrived at the same time as John Wesley and settled in Savannah from 1735 to 1740, before resettling in Pennsylvania.

A Savannah veterans' group had unsuccessfully proposed erecting a memorial to veterans of World War II in Oglethorpe Square It was instead installed on River Street.

The Unitarian Universalist Church was originally based on the square, prior to its move to the western side of Troup Square, a 0.33 miles (0.53 km) to the southeast.

== Dedication ==
Namesake	Image	Note
James Oglethorpe		The square is named for General James Oglethorpe (1696–1785), founder of the colony of Georgia. His statue is located in Chippewa Square.

== Markers and structures ==
Object	Image	Note
Square sign		The square and one of its signs, 2021

== Constituent buildings ==
Each building below is in one of the eight blocks around the square composed of four residential "tything" blocks and four civic ("trust") blocks, now known as the Oglethorpe Plan. They are listed with construction years where known.

Northwestern civic/trust block

- Cluskey Building, 123 Abercorn Street, the now-demolished parsonage for Troup Square's Unitarian Universalist Church
- Standard Oil Building, 110 East President Street (1924)

Southwestern civic/trust block

- Mary Marshall Houses, 127–129 Abercorn Street (1840s)

This trust lot, which is bounded by Abercorn and Drayton Streets, contains two buildings that are among the finest structures of the Greek Revival period in the United States. They were built in the 1840s as rental property by Mrs. Mary Marshall — Walter C. Hartridge, 1964

He also states, possibly incorrectly, that the properties were designed by Charles B. Cluskey.

Southwestern residential/tything block

- Marine Hospital, 115 East York Street (1907)

Northeastern residential/tything block

- Graham Apartment Building, 210 East State Street (1924)
- 216 East State Street (1912)
- Michael Lyons Property, 220–224 East State Street (1893)

Northeastern civic/trust block

- Owens–Thomas House, 124 Abercorn Street (1819) – oldest building on the square

Southeastern civic/trust block

- Gordon–Anderson Building, 127–131 Lincoln Street (1855) – by John Scudder; now the Presidents' Quarter Inn

Southeastern residential/tything block

- Henry Dickerson Duplex, 201–203 East York Street (1853)
- James Mills House, 205 East York Street (1855)
- Jane Young House, 211 East York Street (1853)
- John Feely Duplex, 217–219 East York Street (1872)
- Charles Landershine House, 221 East York Street (1856)
- Joseph Sognier Property (1), 133–135 Lincoln Street (1886) – by P.J. Fallon
- Joseph Sognier Property (2), 139–141 Lincoln Street (1886) – by P.J. Fallon

== Gallery ==
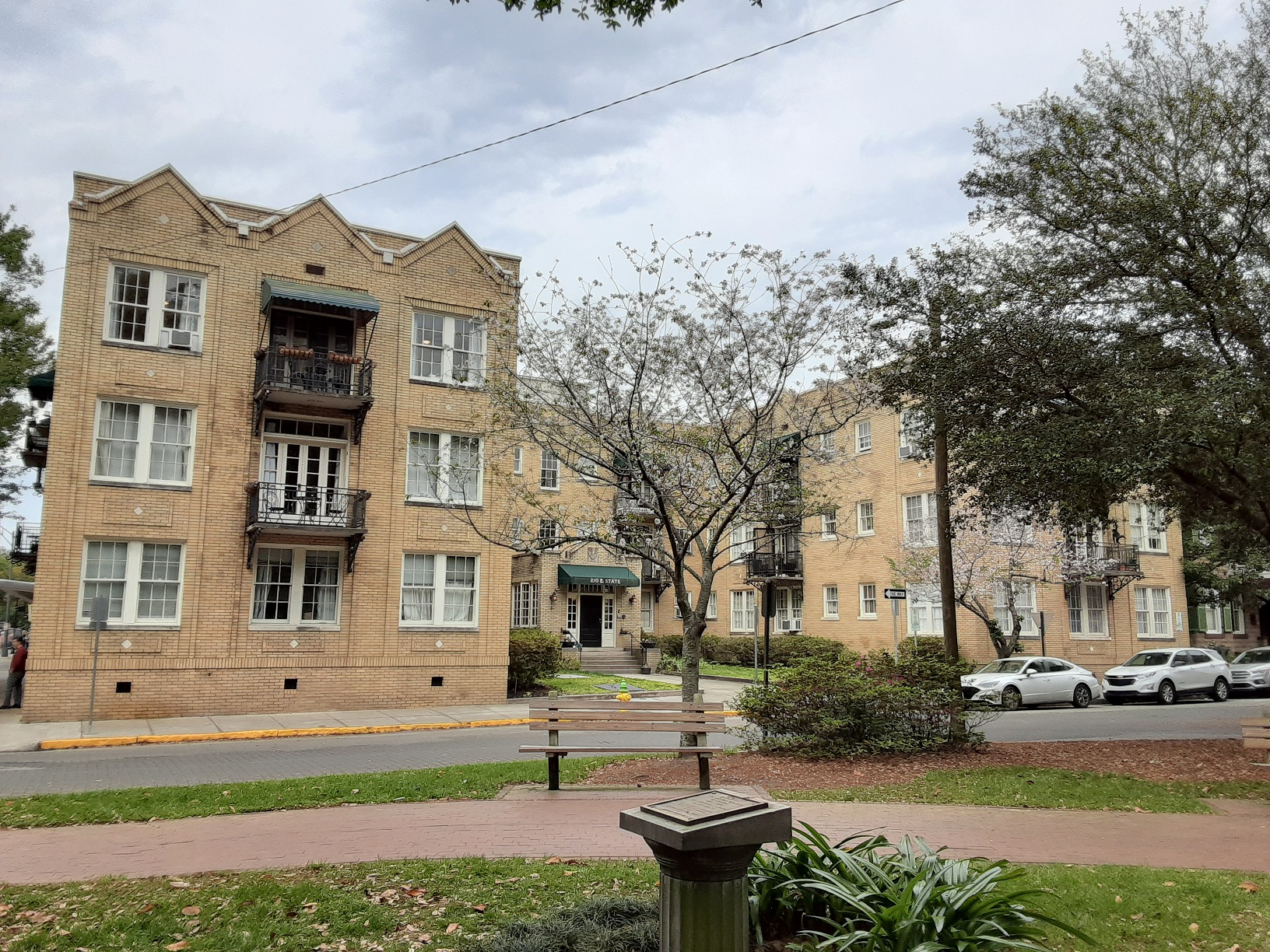
Graham Apartment Building, 210 East State Street

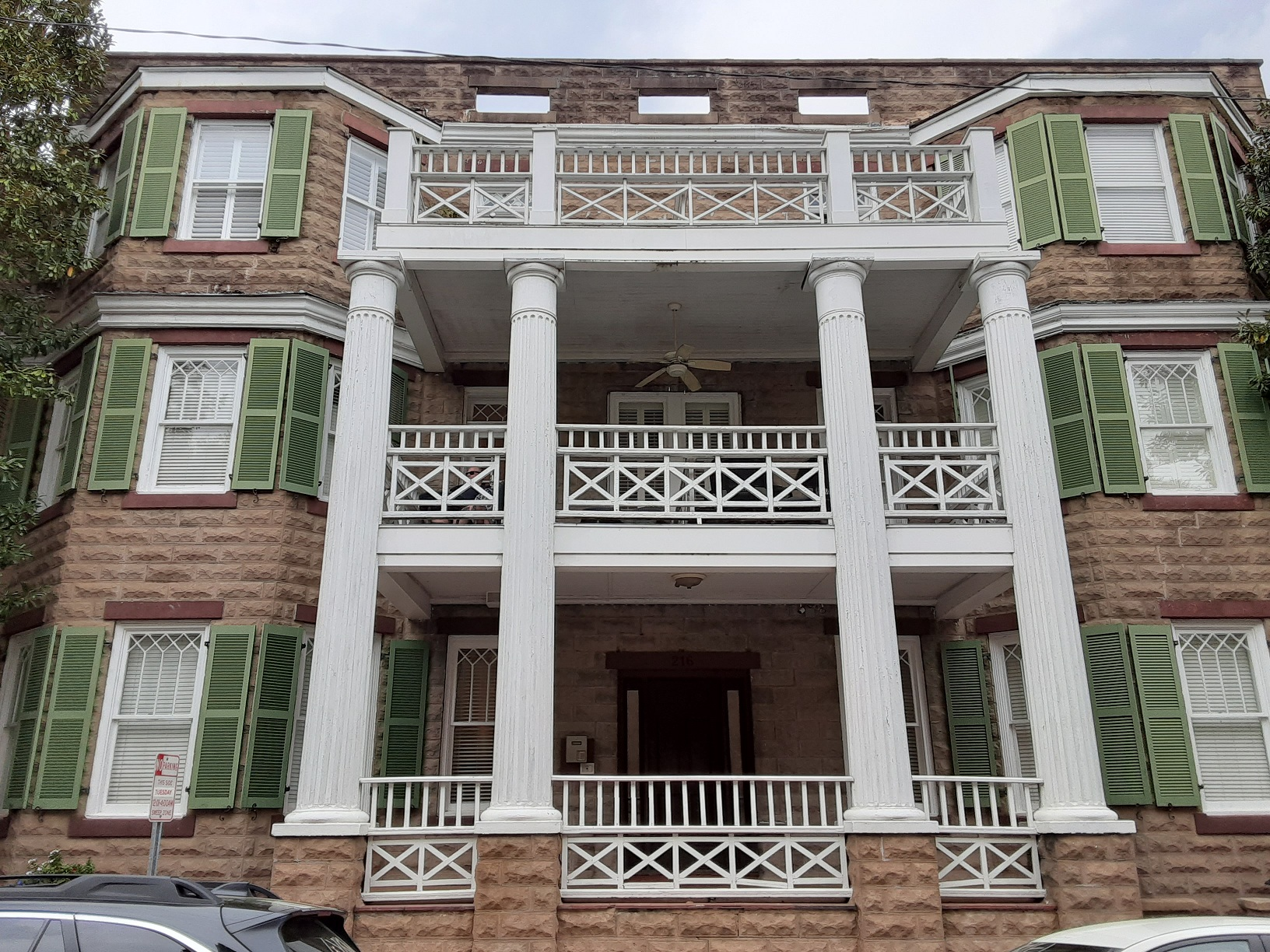
216 East State Street

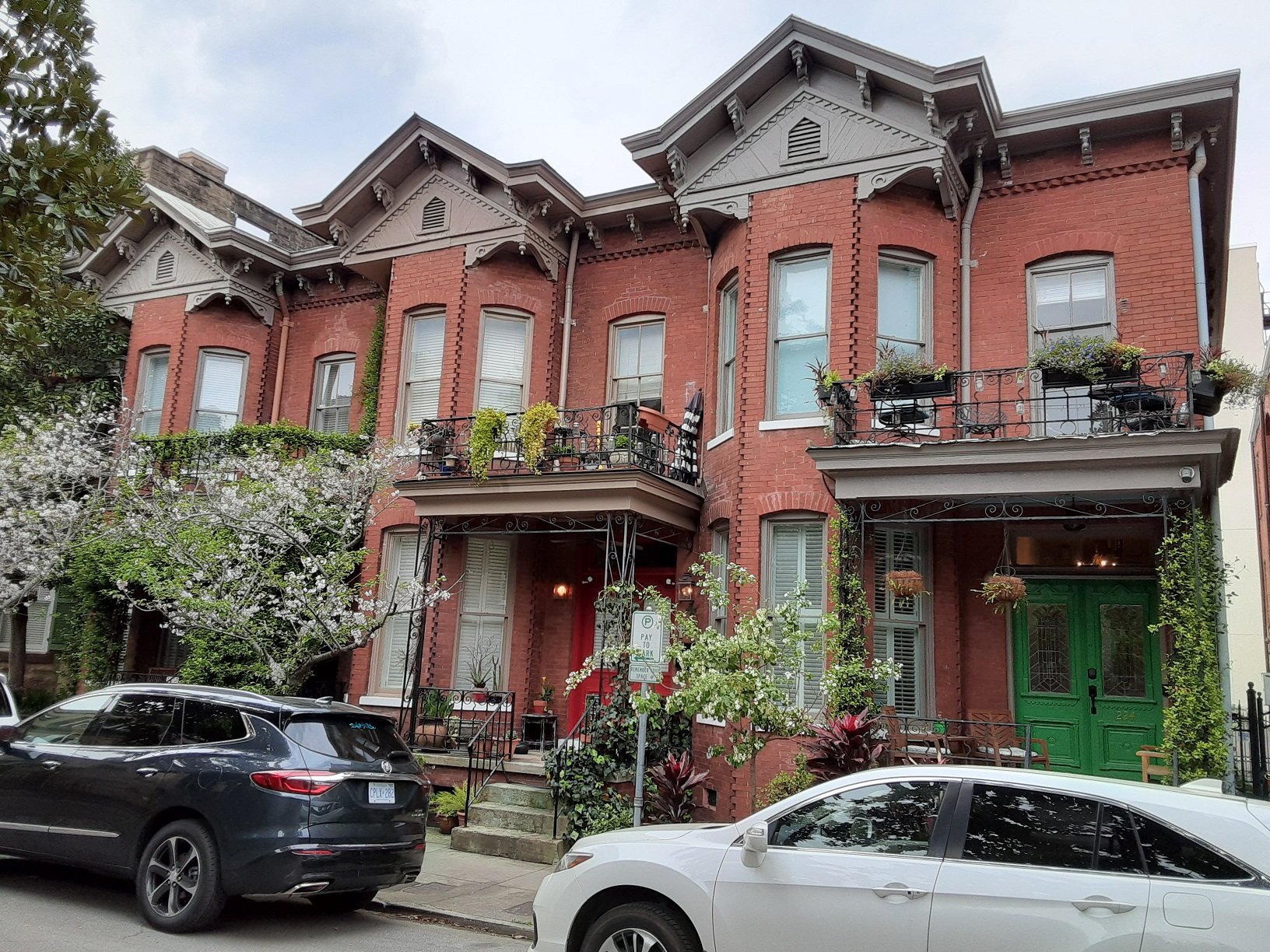
Michael Lyons Property, 220–224 East State Street

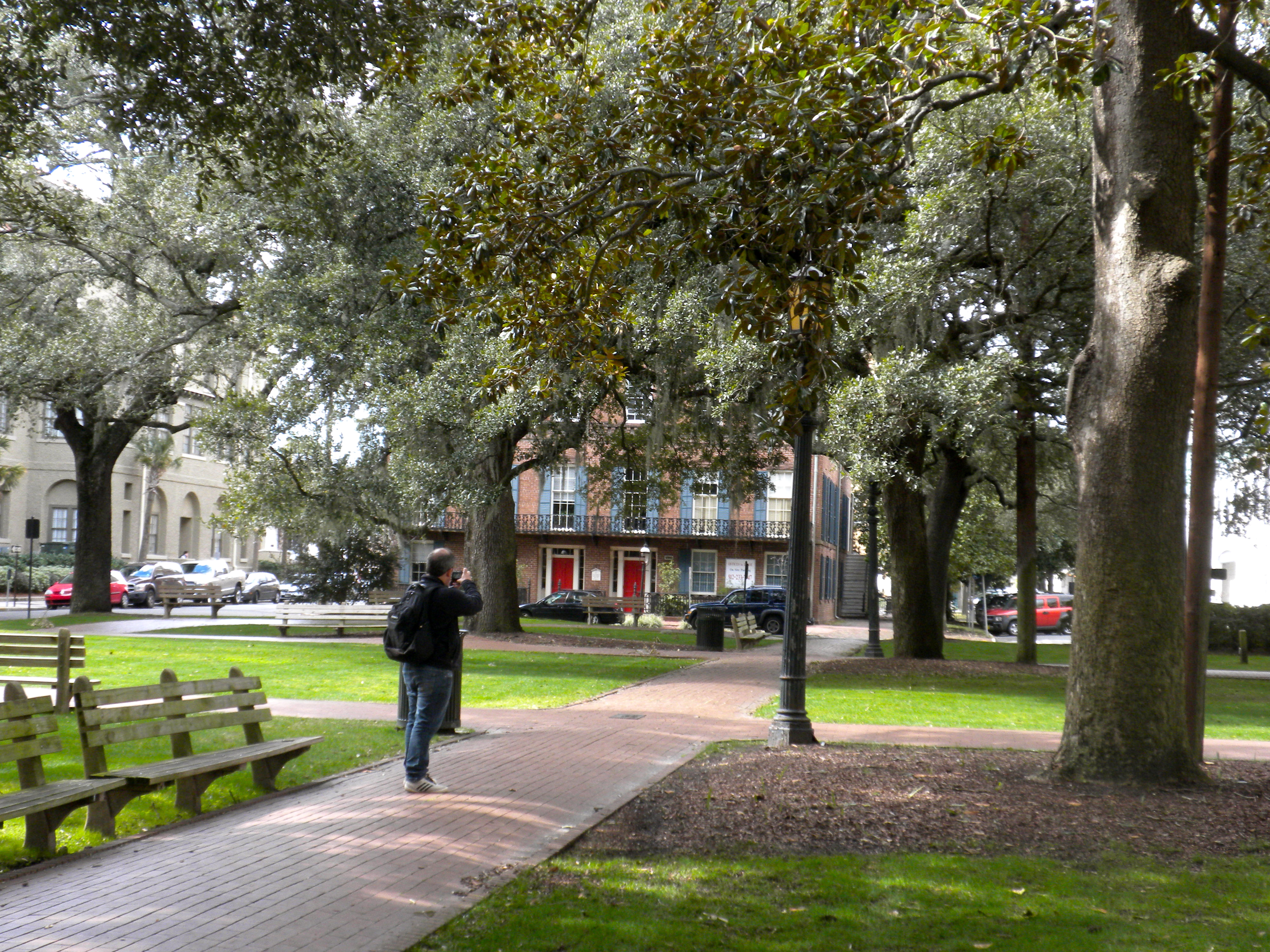
Looking west to the Mary Marshall Houses

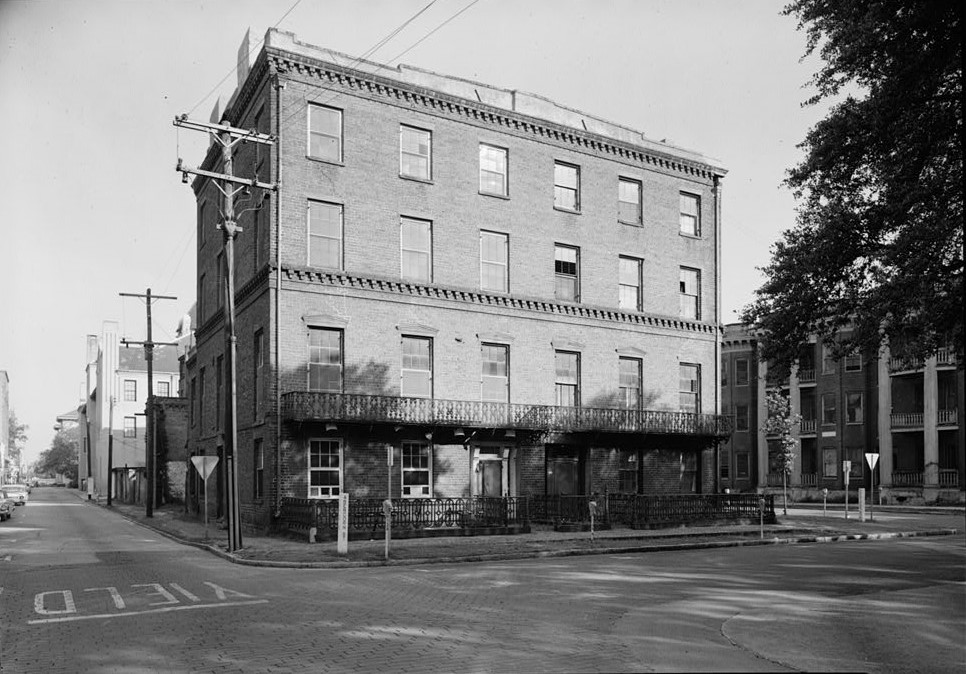
Mary Marshall Houses, 127–129 Abercorn Street

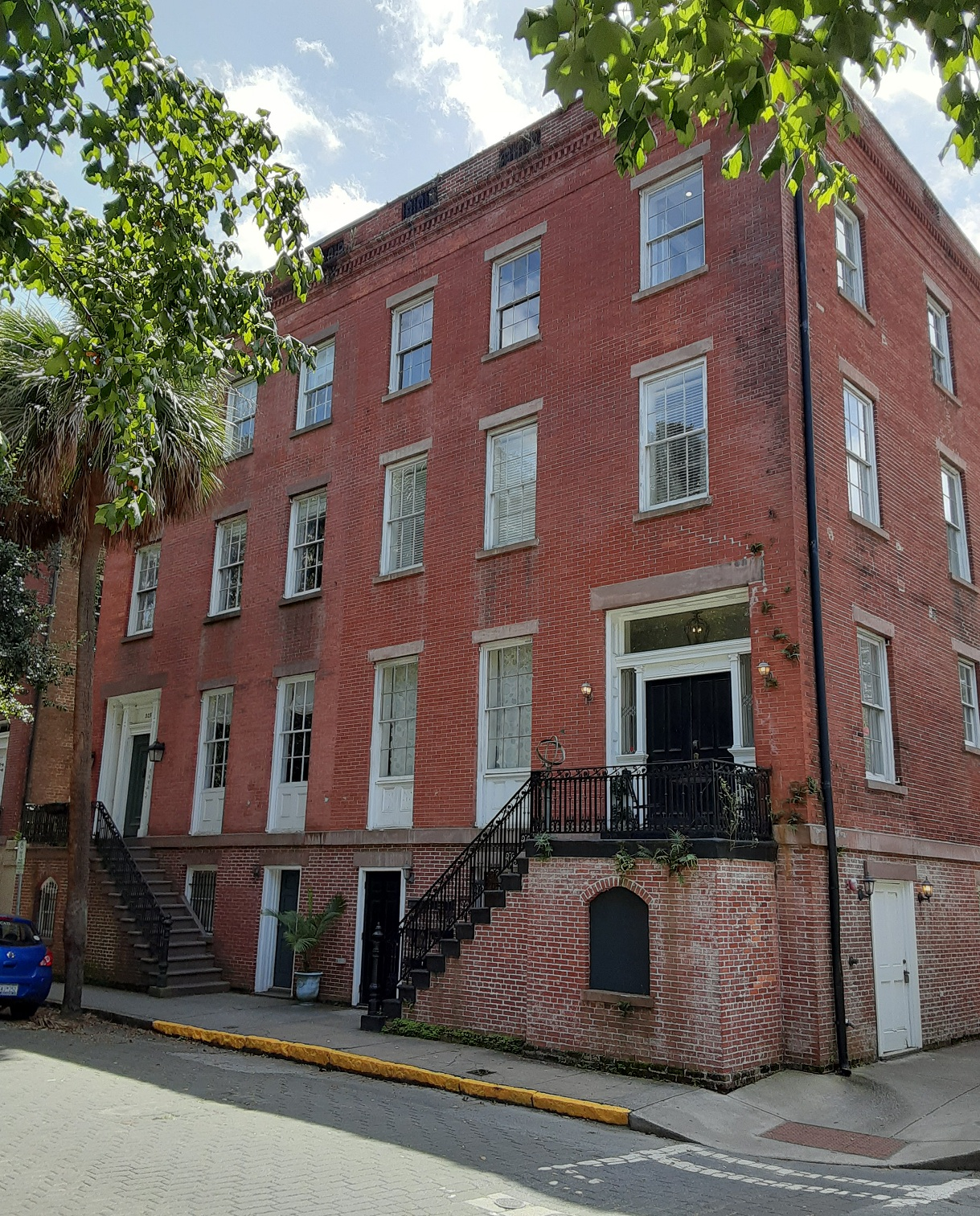
Henry Dickerson Duplex, 201–203 East York Street

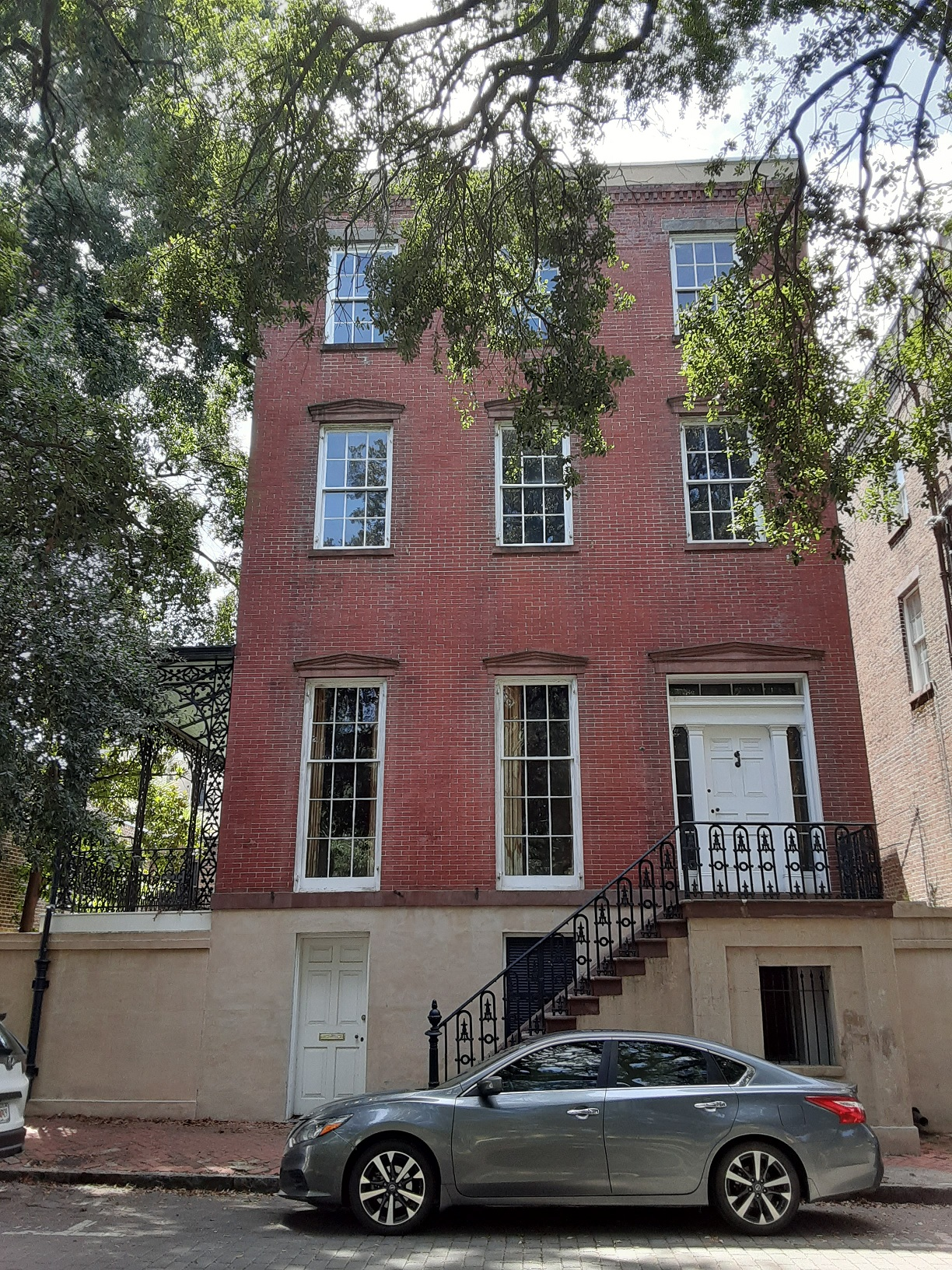
James Mills House, 205 East York Street

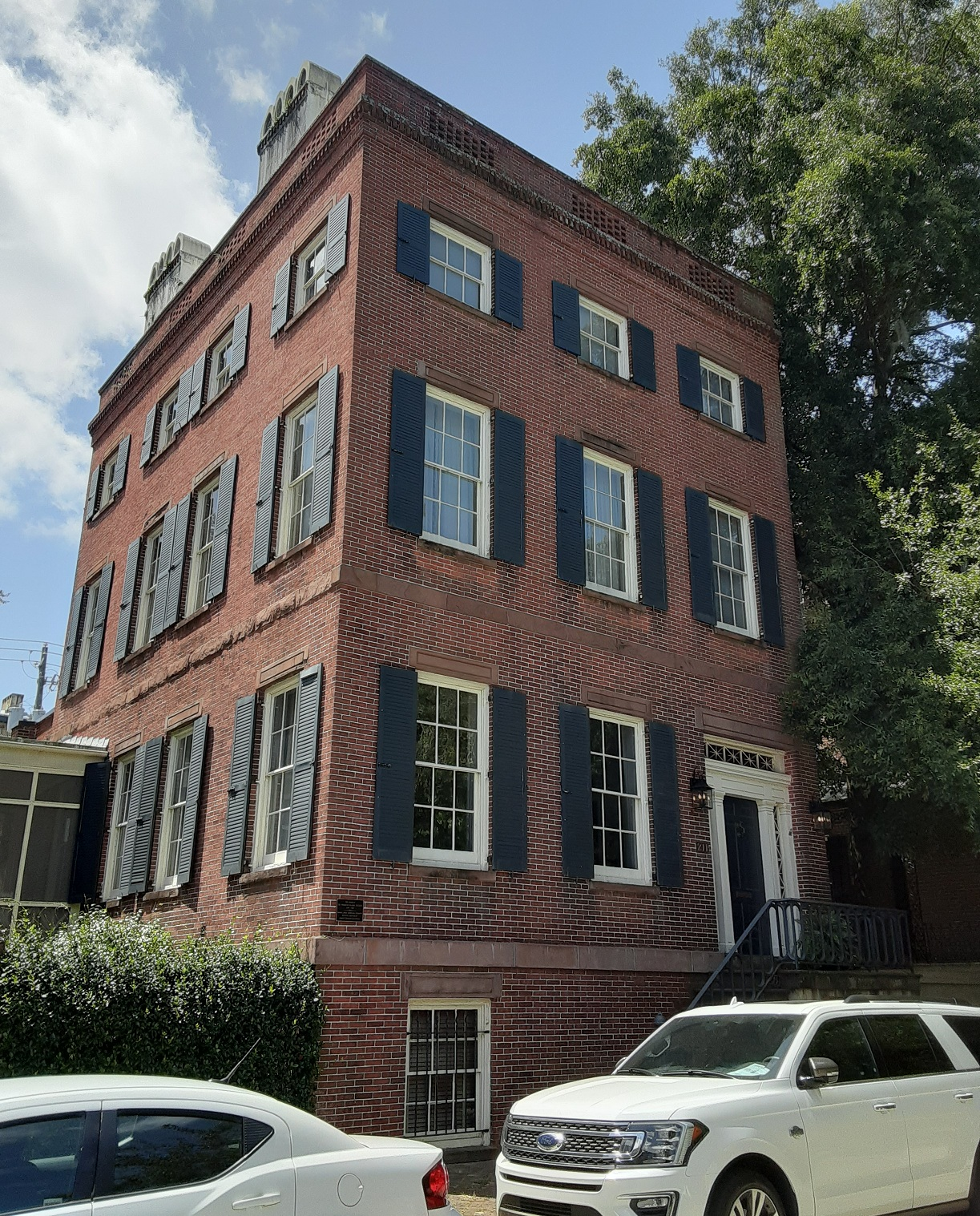
Jane Young House, 211 East York Street

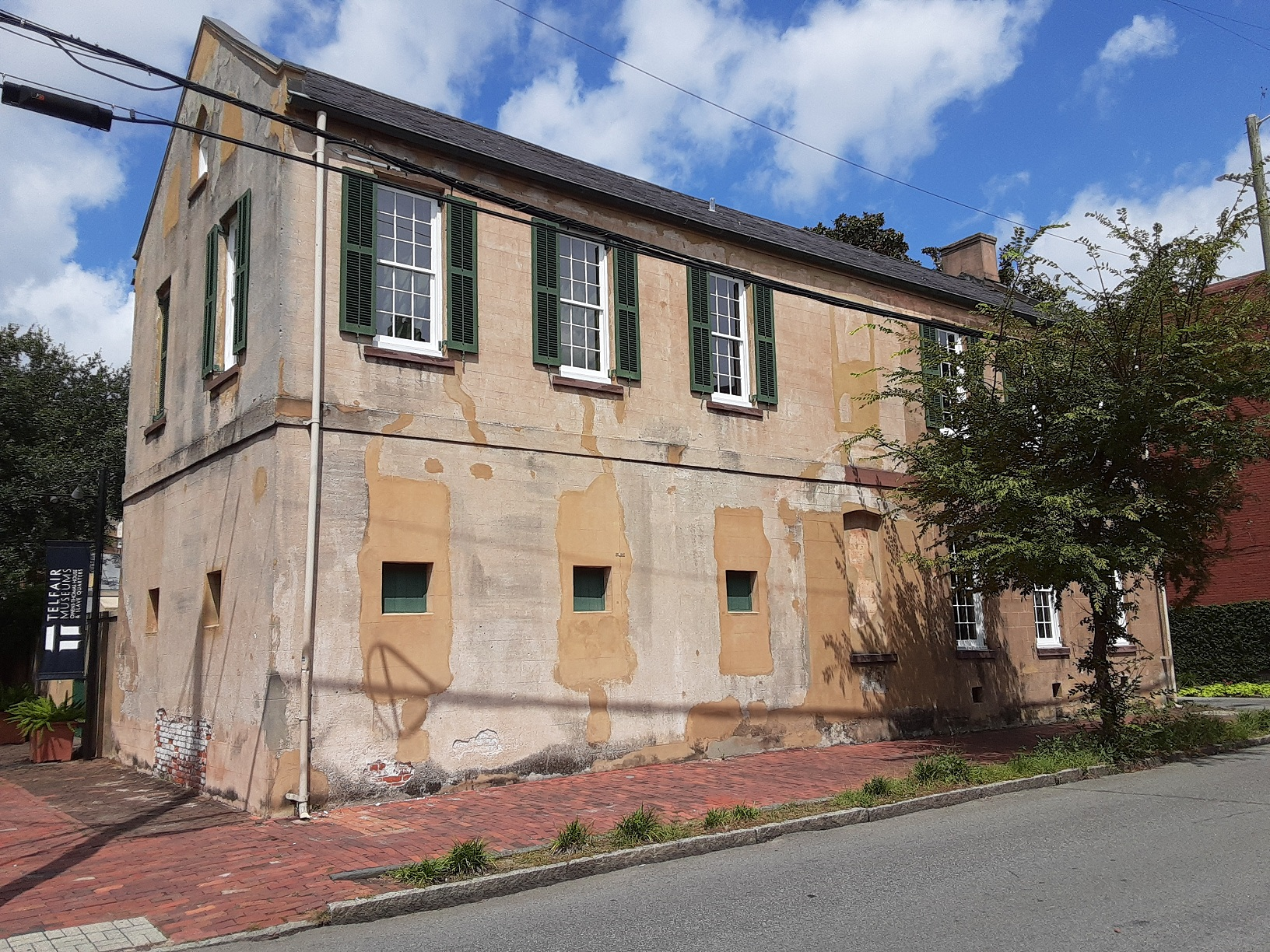
The rear of the Owens–Thomas House on Lincoln Street

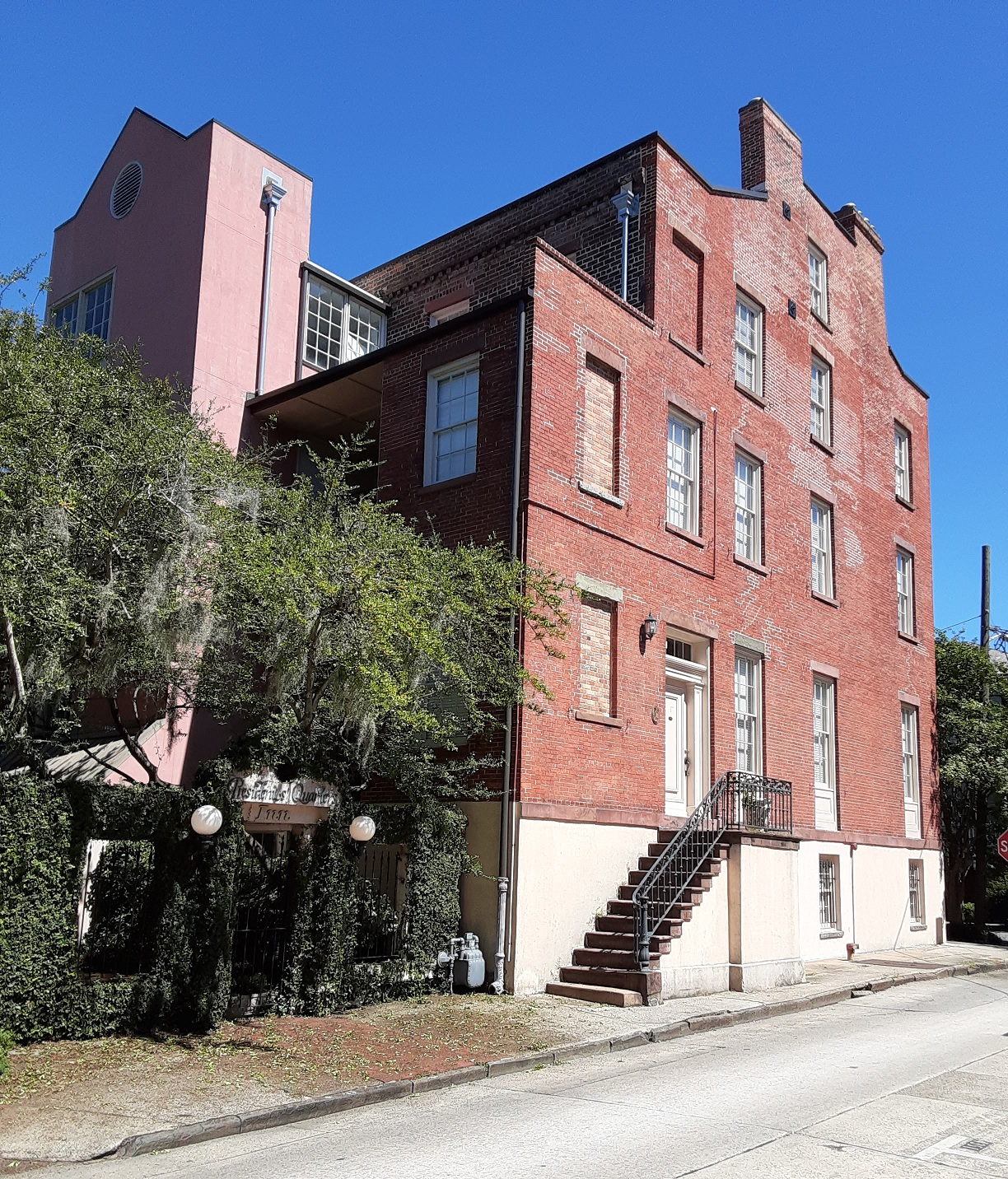
Presidents' Quarters Inn, 127–131 Lincoln Street (viewed from East York Street)

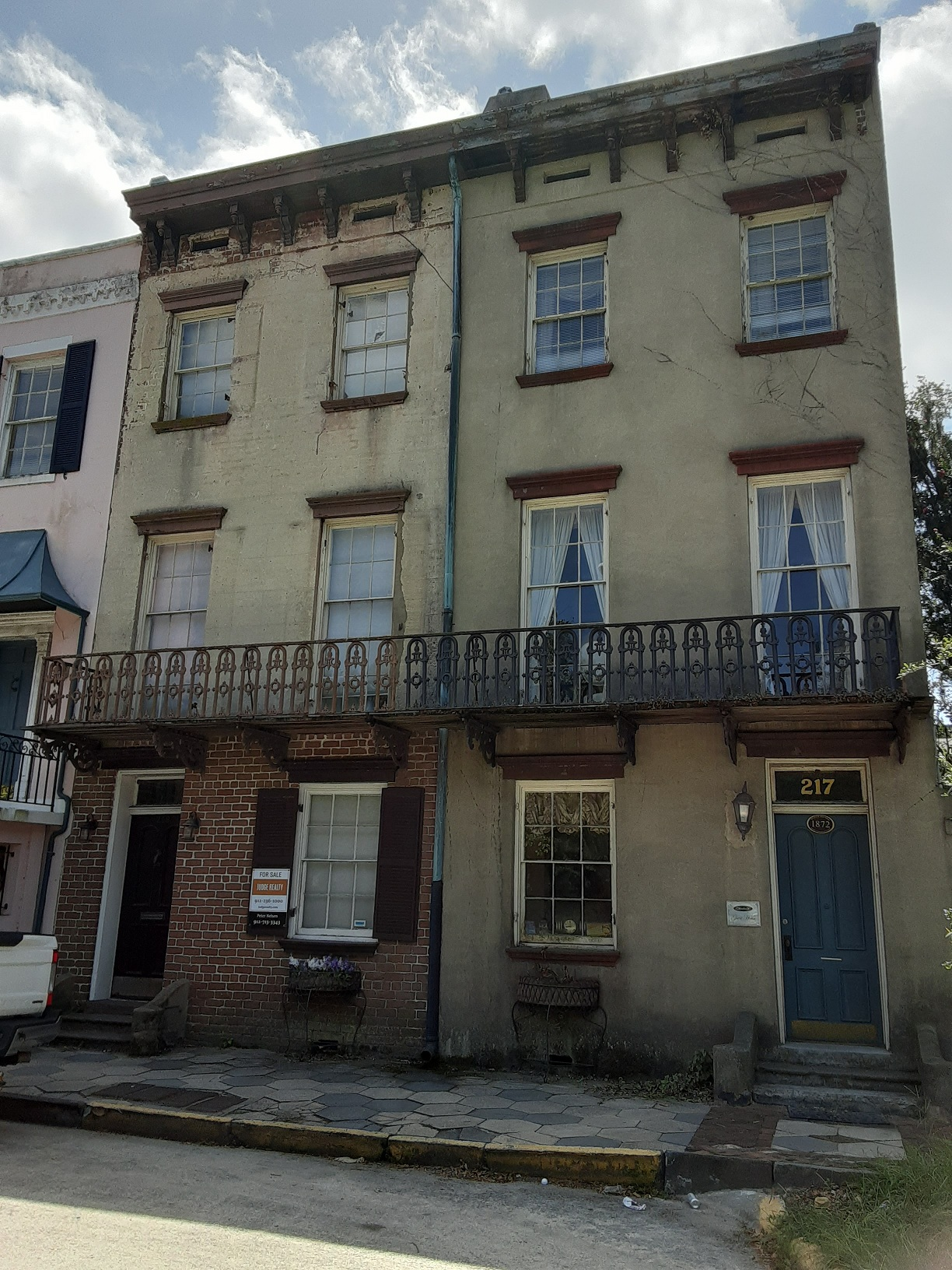
John Feely Duplex, 217–219 East York Street

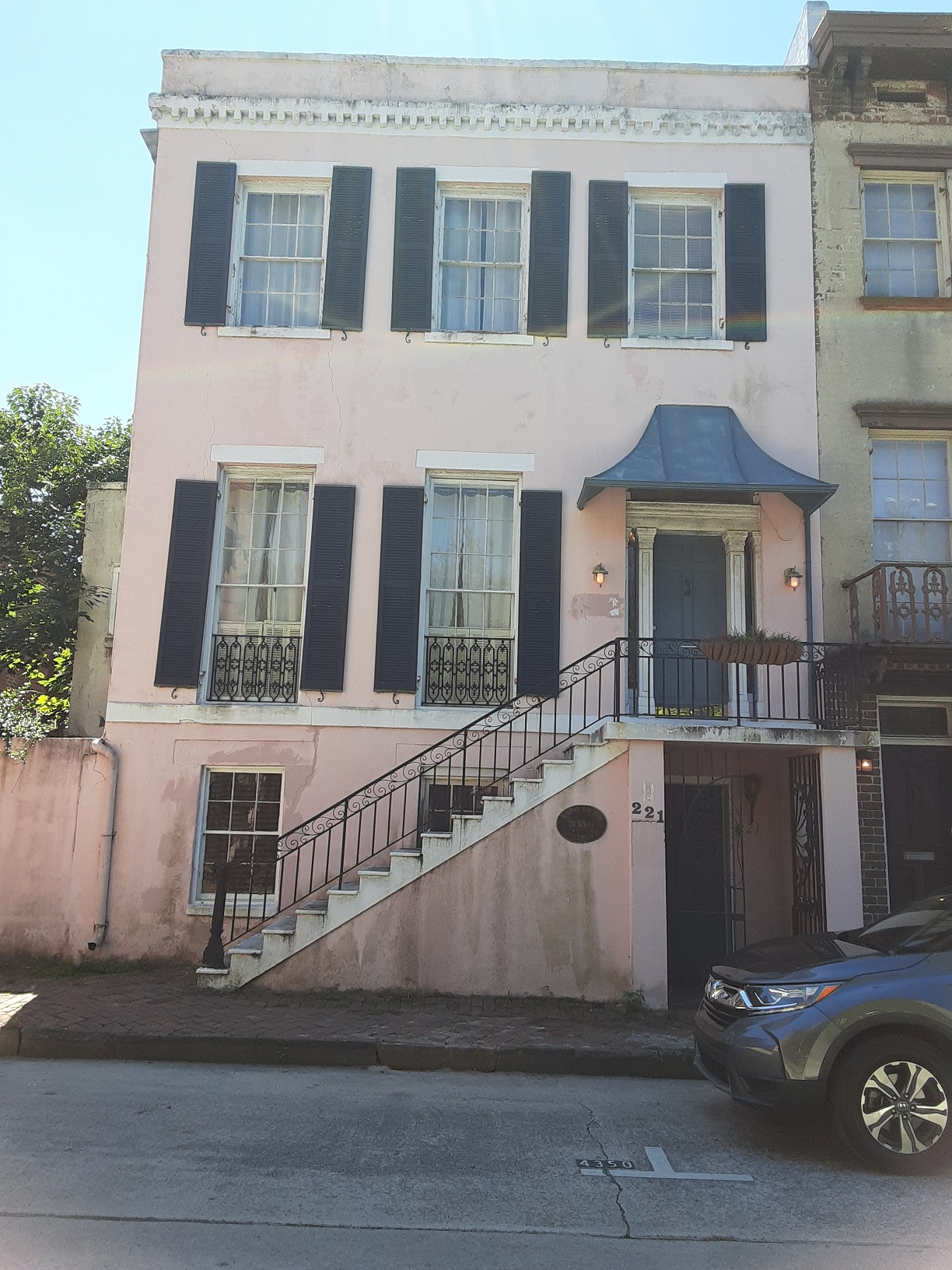
Charles Landershine House, 221 East York Street

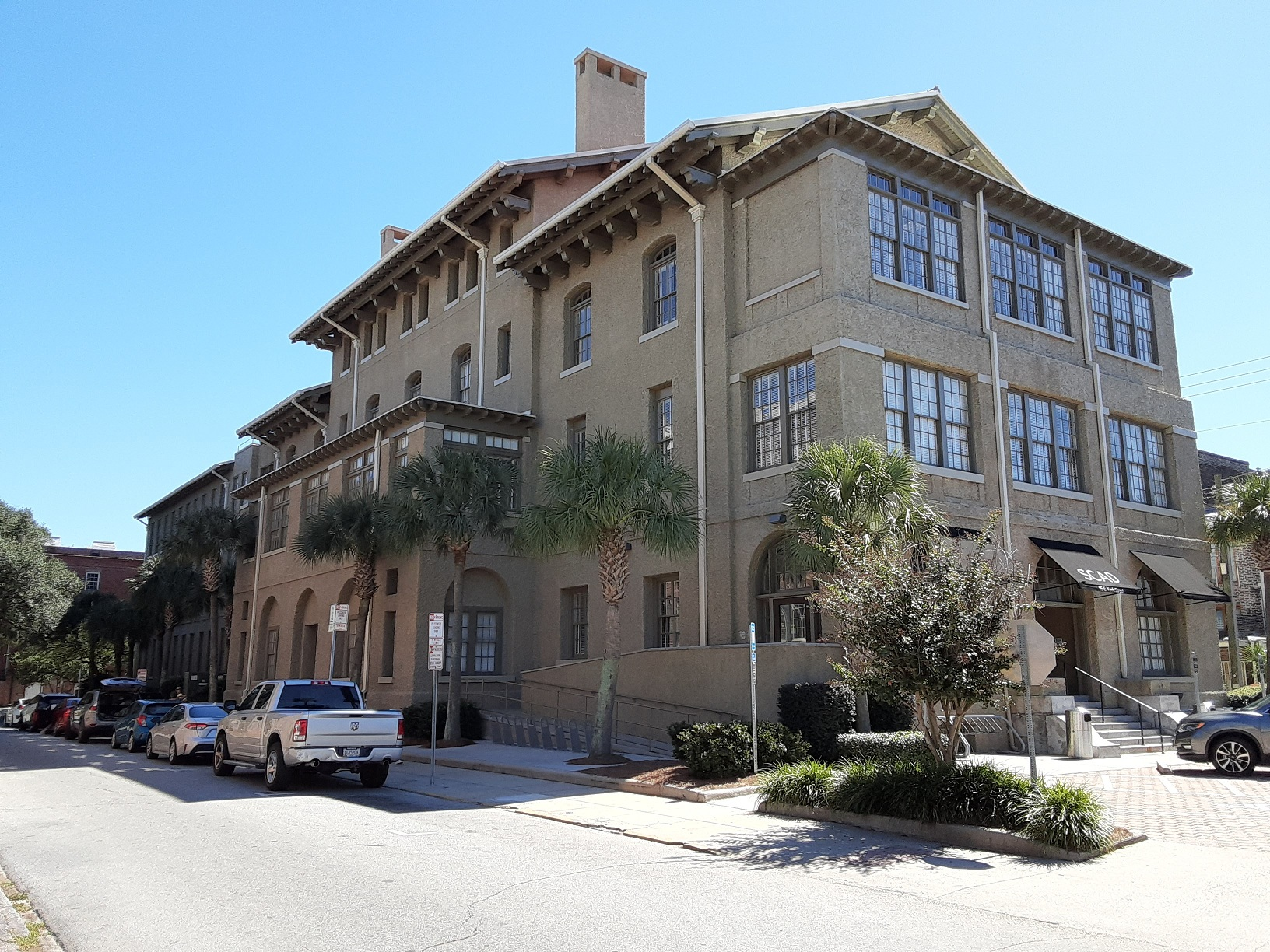
Marine Hospital, 115 East York Street

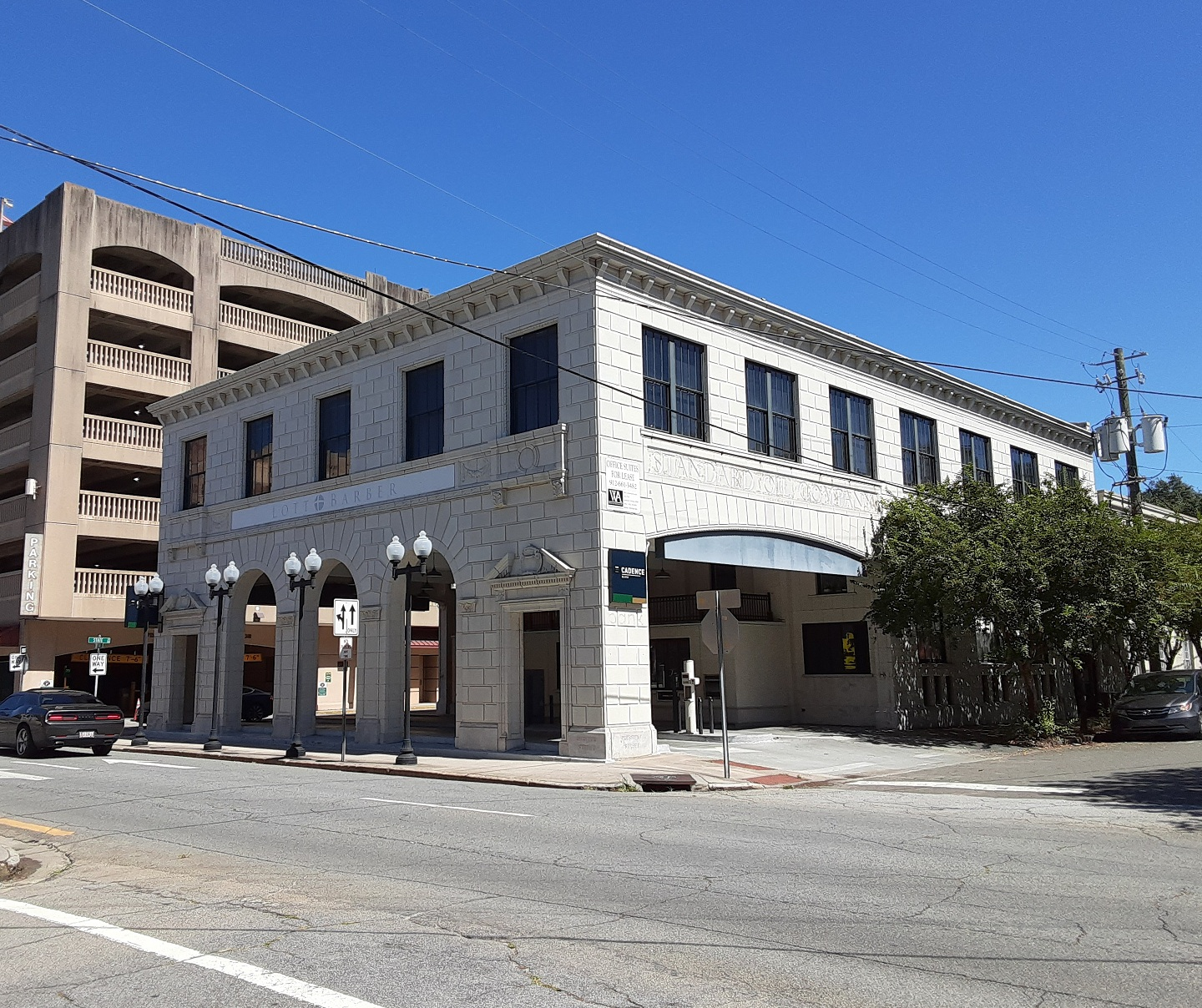
Standard Oil Building, 110 East President Street

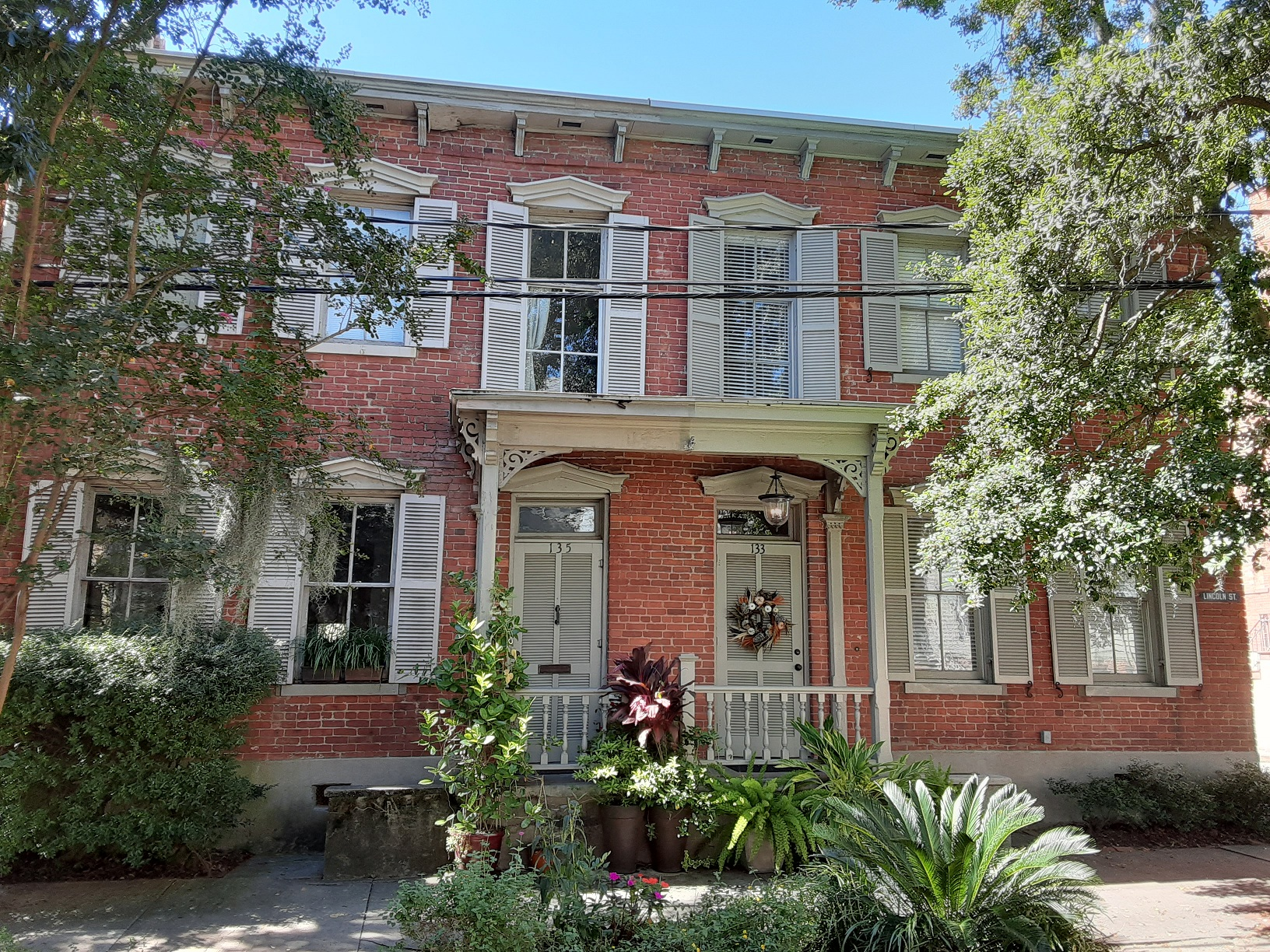
Joseph Sognier Property (1), 133–135 Lincoln Street

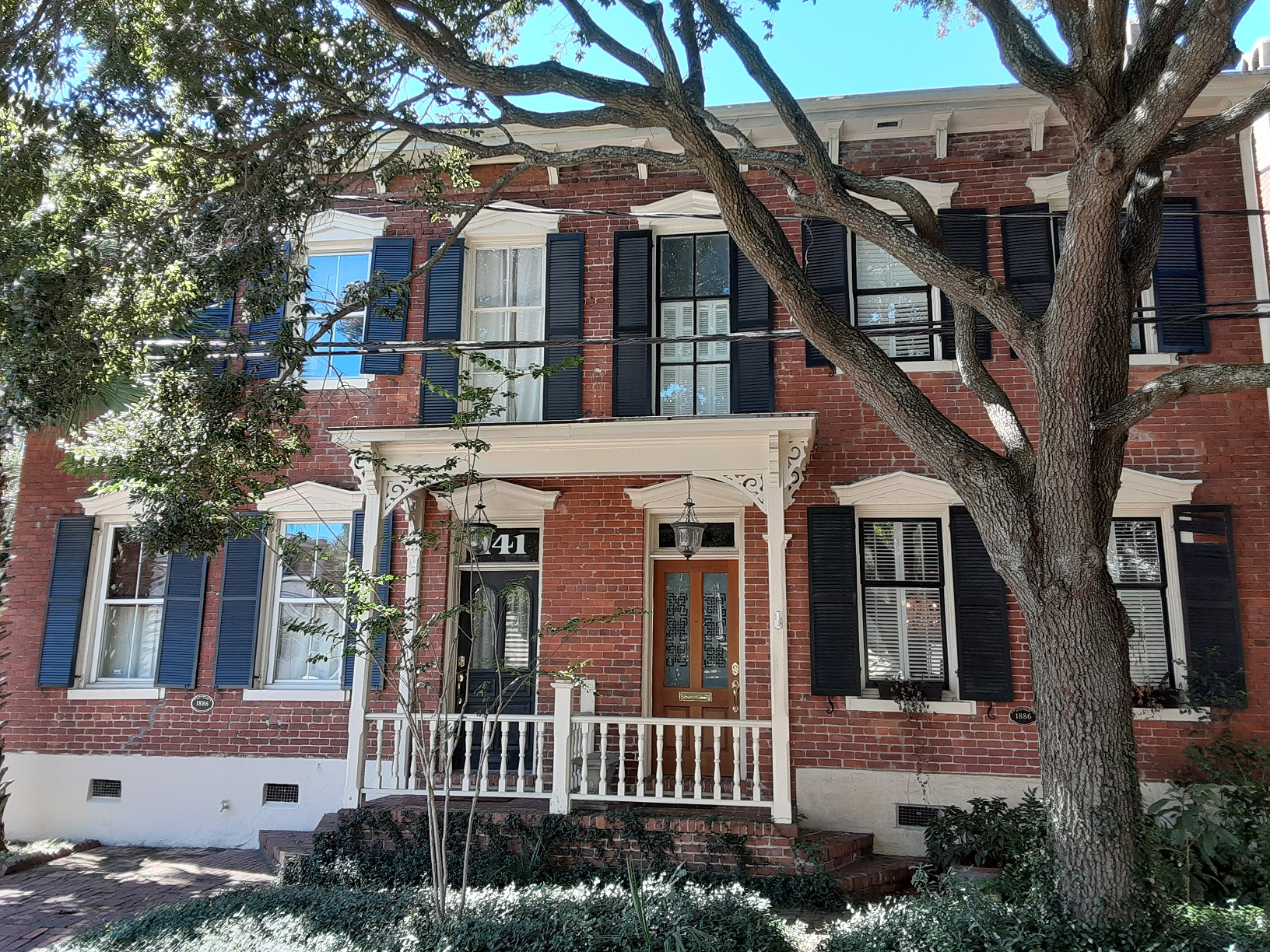
Joseph Sognier Property (2), 139–141 Lincoln Street
