= Taylor Square (Savannah, Georgia) =

Public square in Savannah, Georgia

- Calhoun Square (formerly)
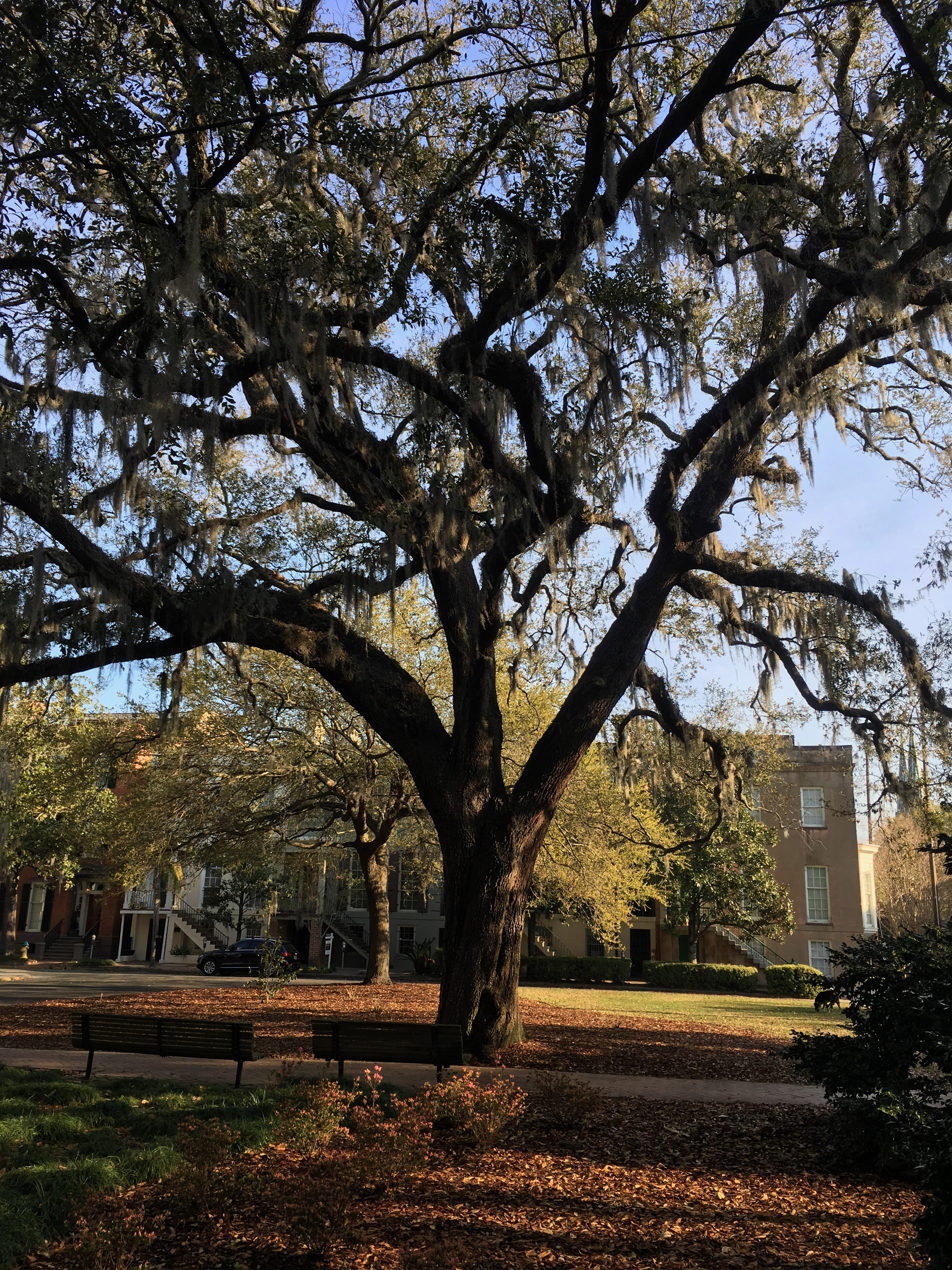
- A live oak in the southwestern corner of the square, looking east
- Interactive map of Taylor Square
- Namesake: John C. Calhoun (1851–2022); Susie King Taylor (2023–present)
- Maintained by: City of Savannah
- Location: Savannah, Georgia, U.S.
- Coordinates: 32.0707°N 81.0925°W
- North: Abercorn Street
- East: East Wayne Street
- South: Abercorn Street
- West: East Wayne Street

Construction
- Completion: 1851 (175 years ago)

Taylor Square, formerly known as Calhoun Square, is one of the 22 squares of Savannah, Georgia, United States. Laid out in 1851 south of Lafayette Square, west of Whitefield Square, and east of Monterey Square, it is named in honor of Susie King Taylor, an educator, memoirist, and the first Black nurse to serve in the American Civil War.

The oldest buildings on the square, the Adam Short Property and the Alexander Bennett House (both on East Taylor Street), date to 1853. The square is sometimes informally called Massie Square due to the presence of Massie Common School House, which was built in 1855 and lies just outside. The Wesley Monumental United Methodist Church, founded in 1868, is located directly across the street from the square's western side.

== Name ==
The square had previously been used as a "negro burial ground" (known as "Strangers Burial Ground" and "Potter's Field"); in 1855, the bodies of enslaved residents Emily and Rinah were removed to Laurel Grove Cemetery. In 2004, a skull was found by utility workers outside the Massie Heritage Interpretation Center on the square's southeastern side.

This legacy prompted a 2021 movement to rename the square after the Sankofa bird, a Ghanaian symbol expressing the "importance of knowing one's history." City councilors voted unanimously on November 10, 2022, to remove Calhoun's name from the square.

In August 2023, after discussion and debate, the Savannah City Council settled on a new name, Taylor Square. The council approved the installation of a new granite marker, which will note that the square that was once named for John C. Calhoun (Calhoun Square) is now named for Susie King Taylor (Taylor Square).

== Dedication ==
Namesake	Image	Note
John C. Calhoun		In 1851, the square was dedicated to South Carolina statesman John C. Calhoun, who served as Secretary of War, Secretary of State, and as Vice President in the administrations of John Quincy Adams and Andrew Jackson.
Susie King Taylor		The square was renamed in 2023 for Susie King Taylor, the first black nurse during the American Civil War. Taylor looked after wounded Union troops of the black 1st South Carolina Volunteer Infantry Regiment.

== Constituent buildings ==
Each building below is in one of the eight blocks around the square composed of four residential "tything" blocks and four civic ("trust") blocks, now known as the Oglethorpe Plan. They are listed with construction years where known.

Northwestern residential/tything block

- Mary Demere House, also known as The House on Taylor, 128 East Taylor Street (1860) – bay windows added 1894
- Mary Demere (Estate of) House, 126 East Taylor Street (1872)
- Adam Short Property, 118–122 East Taylor Street (1853) – joint-oldest building on the square
- 108–114 East Taylor Street (1873)
- John Kuck House, 106 East Taylor Street (1906)
- Alexander Bennett House, 102 East Taylor Street (1853) – joint-oldest building on the square

Northwestern trust/civic block

- Sara Clark House, 421 Abercorn Street (1859) – additional level added in 1894

Southwestern trust/civic block

- Wesley Monumental United Methodist Church, 429 Abercorn Street (1875)

Southwestern residential/tything block

- John B. Berry House, 127 East Gordon Street (1856)
- Adolphus Gomm House, 115 East Gordon Street (1869)
- Charles Hutchins House, 113 East Gordon Street (1868/1897)
- John Mingledorff Property, 439 Abercorn Street (1856)

Northeastern residential/tything block

- William Rogers House, 202 East Taylor Street (1859)
- George Ash Row House (1), 206–210 East Taylor Street (1855)
- Andrew Hanley House, 214 East Taylor Street (1883)
- George Ash & Francis Grimball Duplex, 216–218 East Taylor Street (1854)
- George Ash Row House (2), 220–224 East Taylor Street (1869)

Northeastern trust/civic block

- Easton Yonge House, 426 Abercorn Street (1855) – by George Ash; side porch added 1909

Southeastern trust/civic block

- 430–432 Abercorn Street (1868)
- Edward Purse Duplex, 220–222 East Gordon Street (1856)

Southeastern residential/tything block

- Massie Common School House, 201–213 East Gordon Street (1855)
- John Guerrard Row House, 215–229 East Gordon Street (1872)
- Lengre Building, 233 East Gordon Street (1923)
- Flora Max House, 235 East Gordon Street (1894)
- Thomas Davis House, 237 East Gordon Street (1893)

== Gallery ==
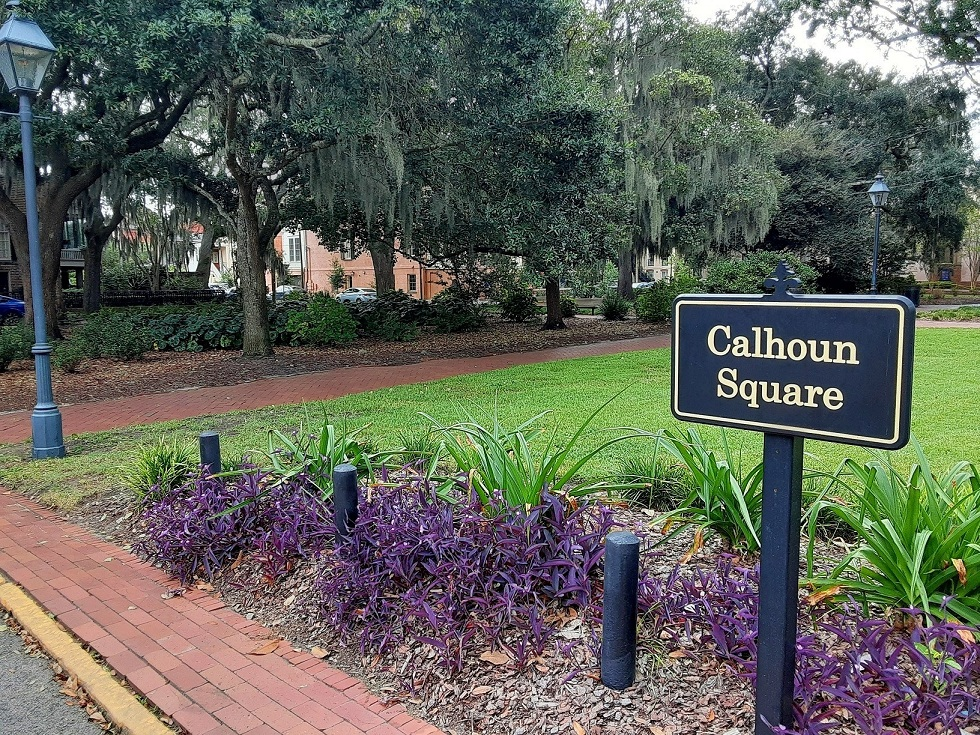
Calhoun Square (formerly named after John C. Calhoun)

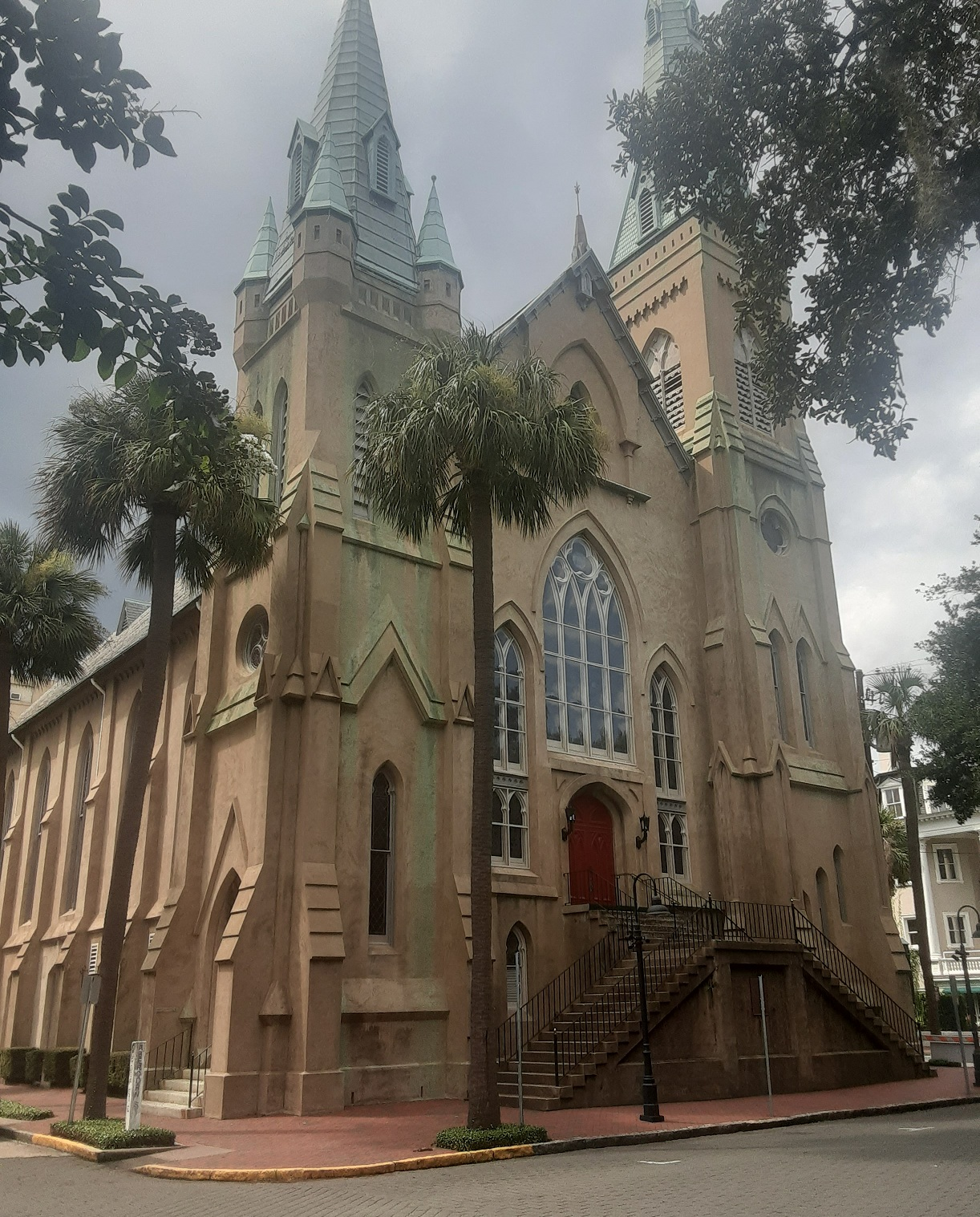
Wesley Monumental United Methodist Church (UMC)

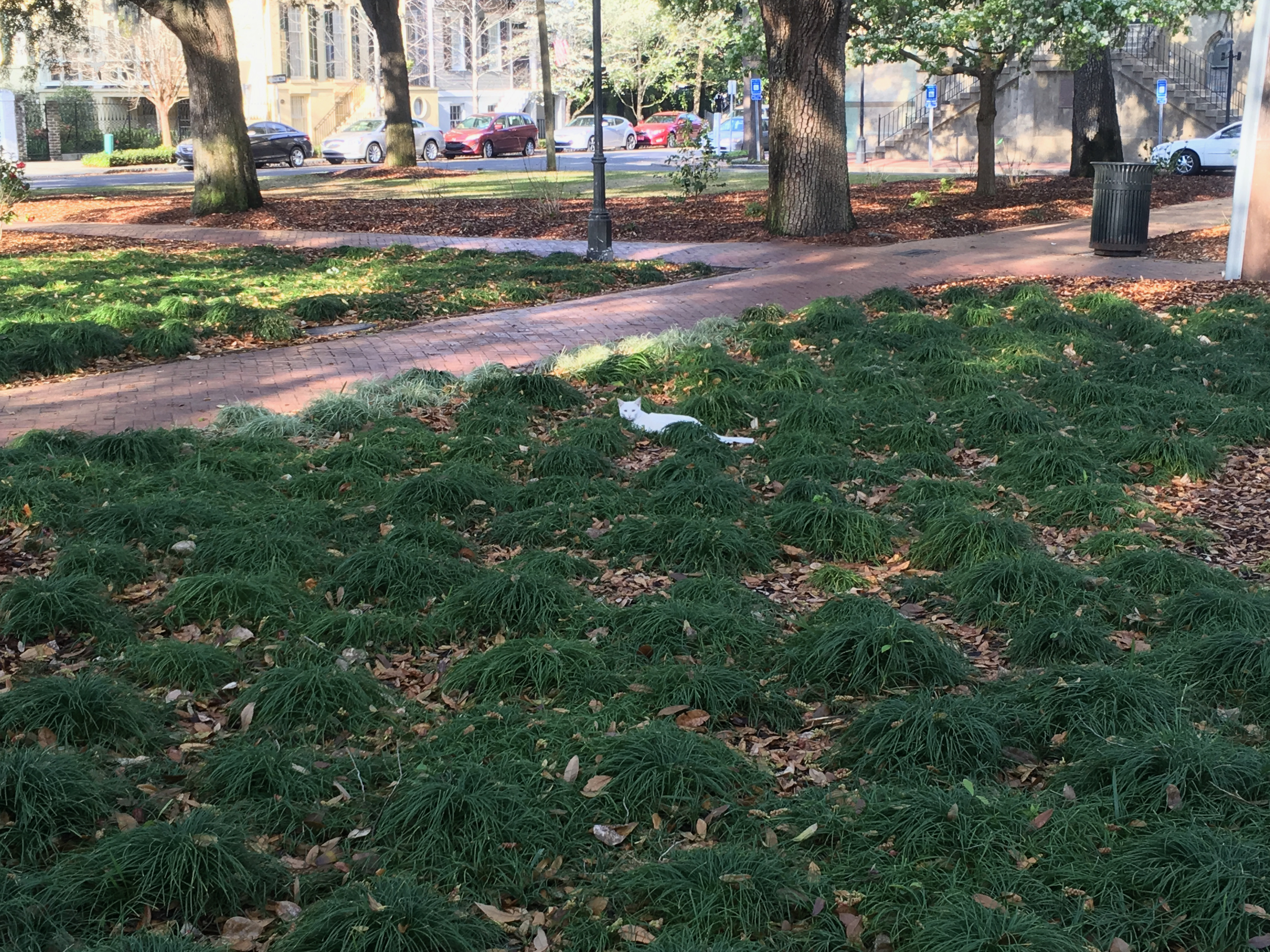
The square's unique clumps of grass, looking southwest towards the UMC

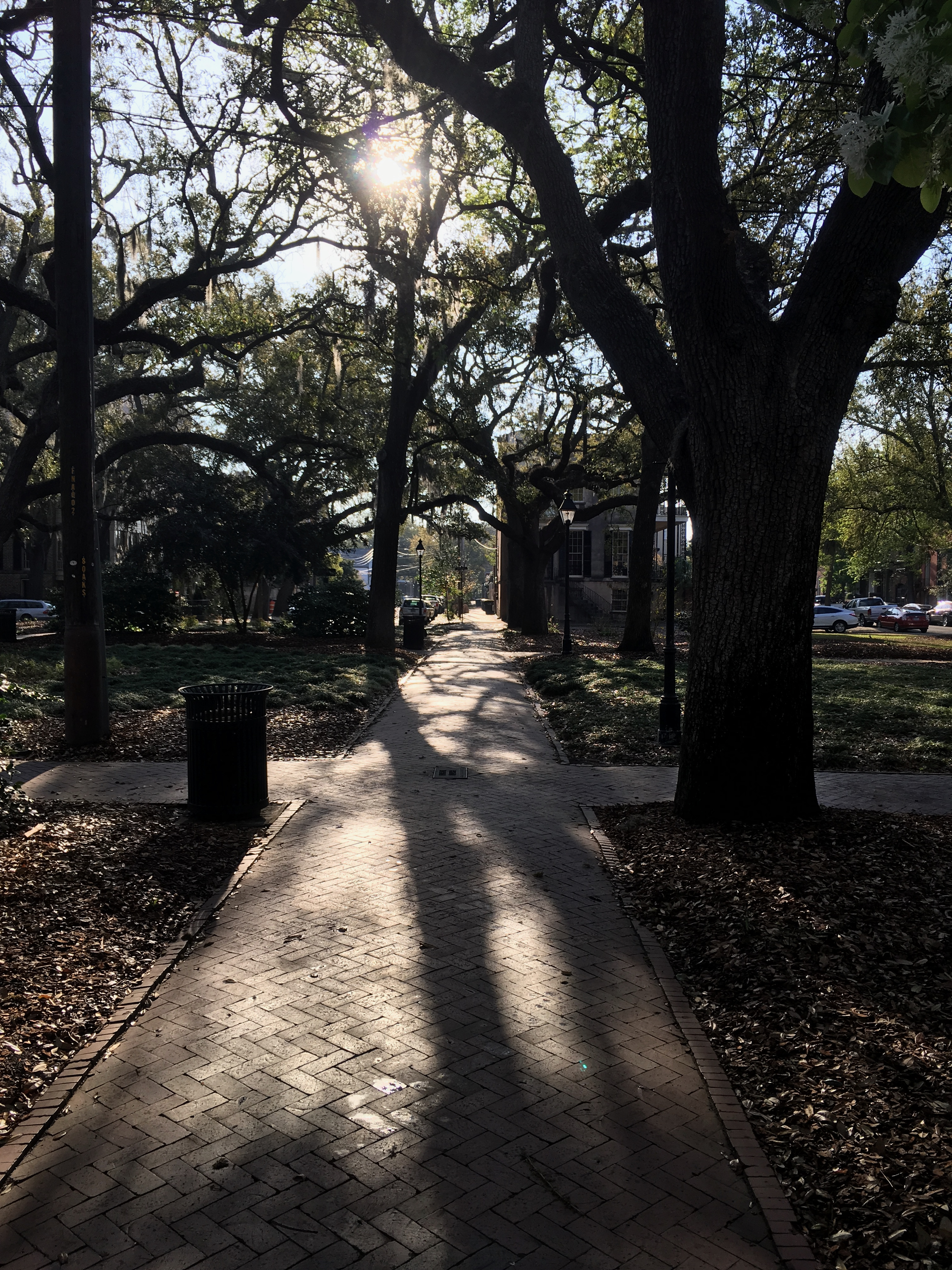
Looking east towards 432 Abercorn Street

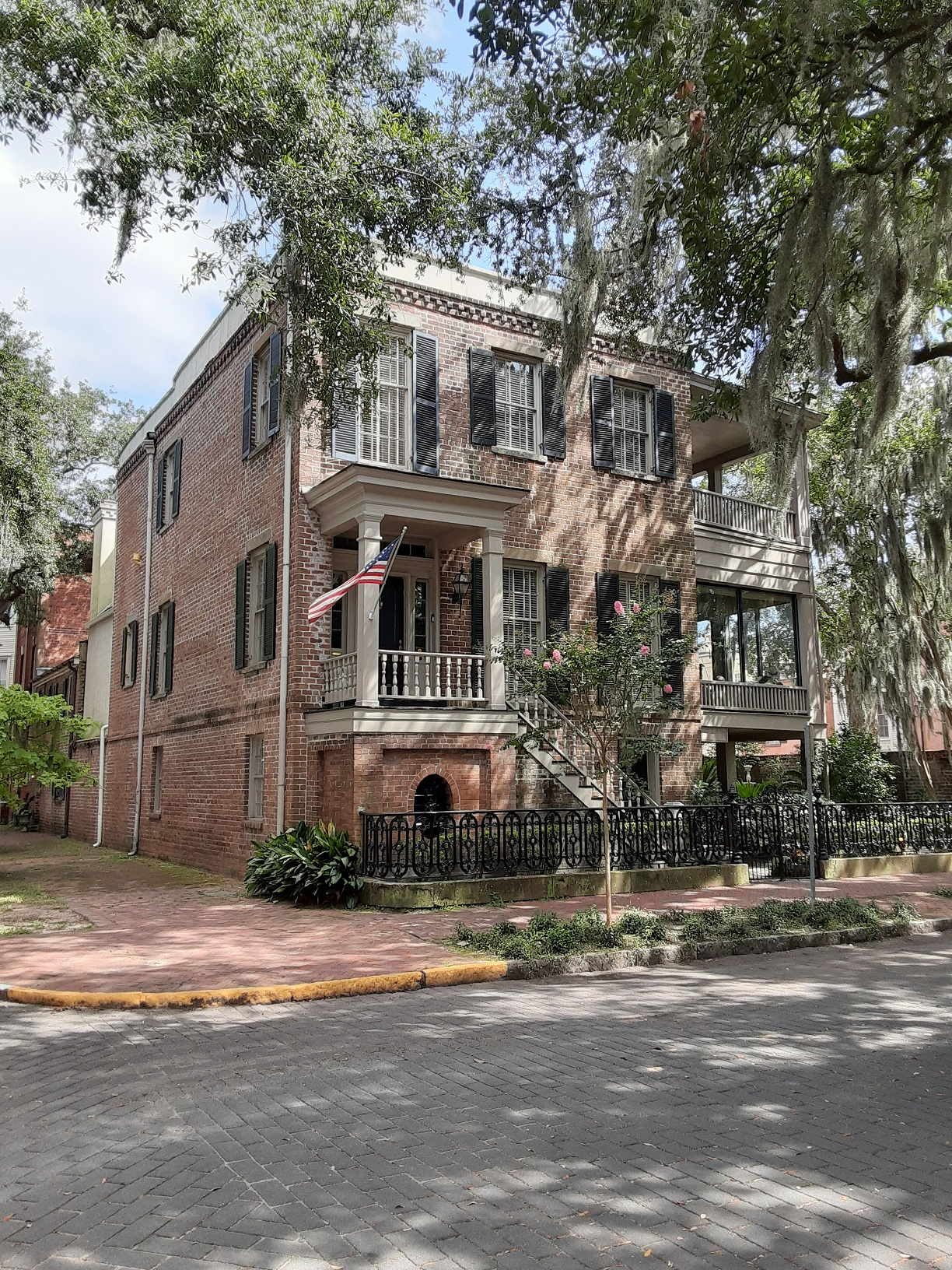
Easton Yonge House, 426 Abercorn Street

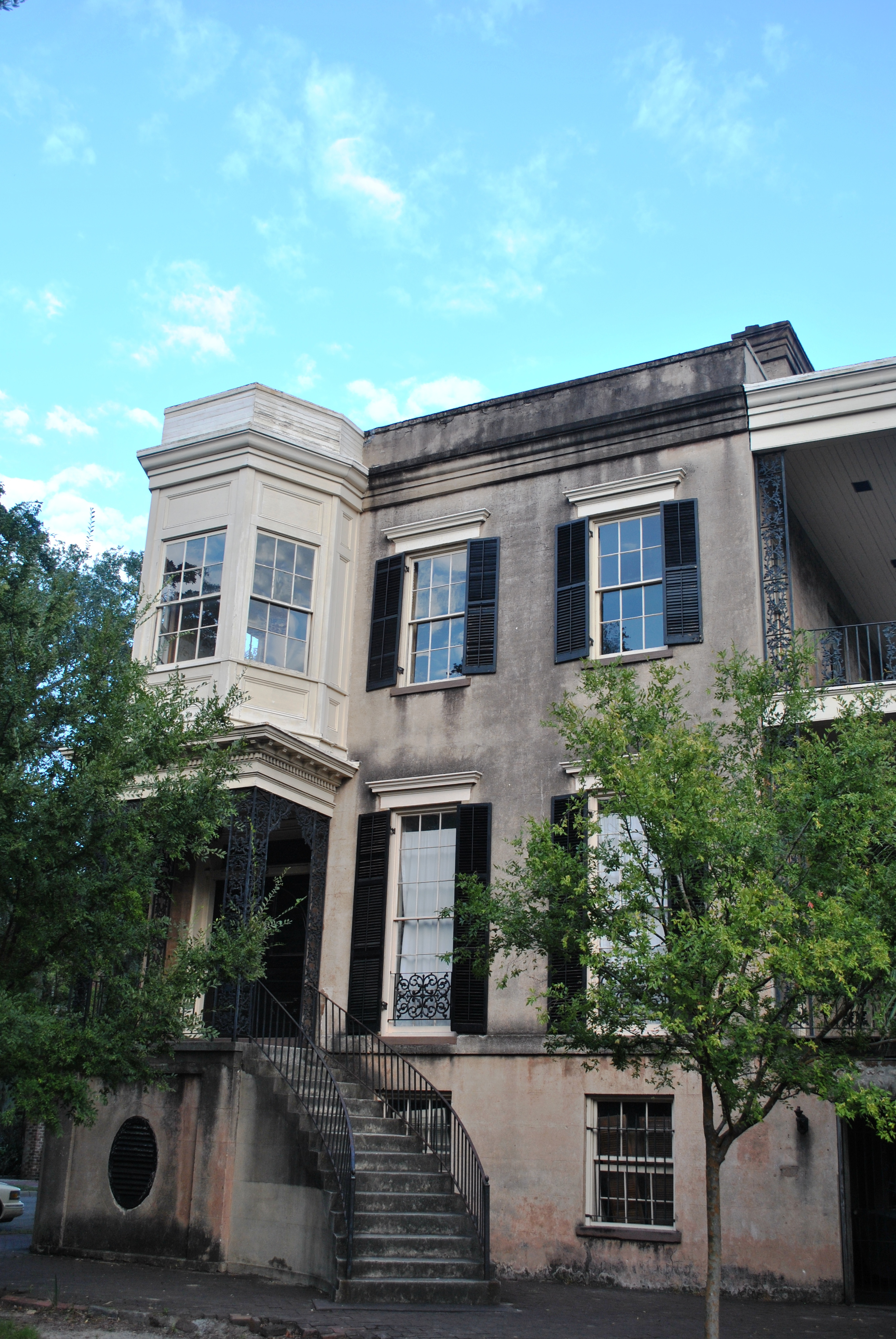
430–432 Abercorn Street

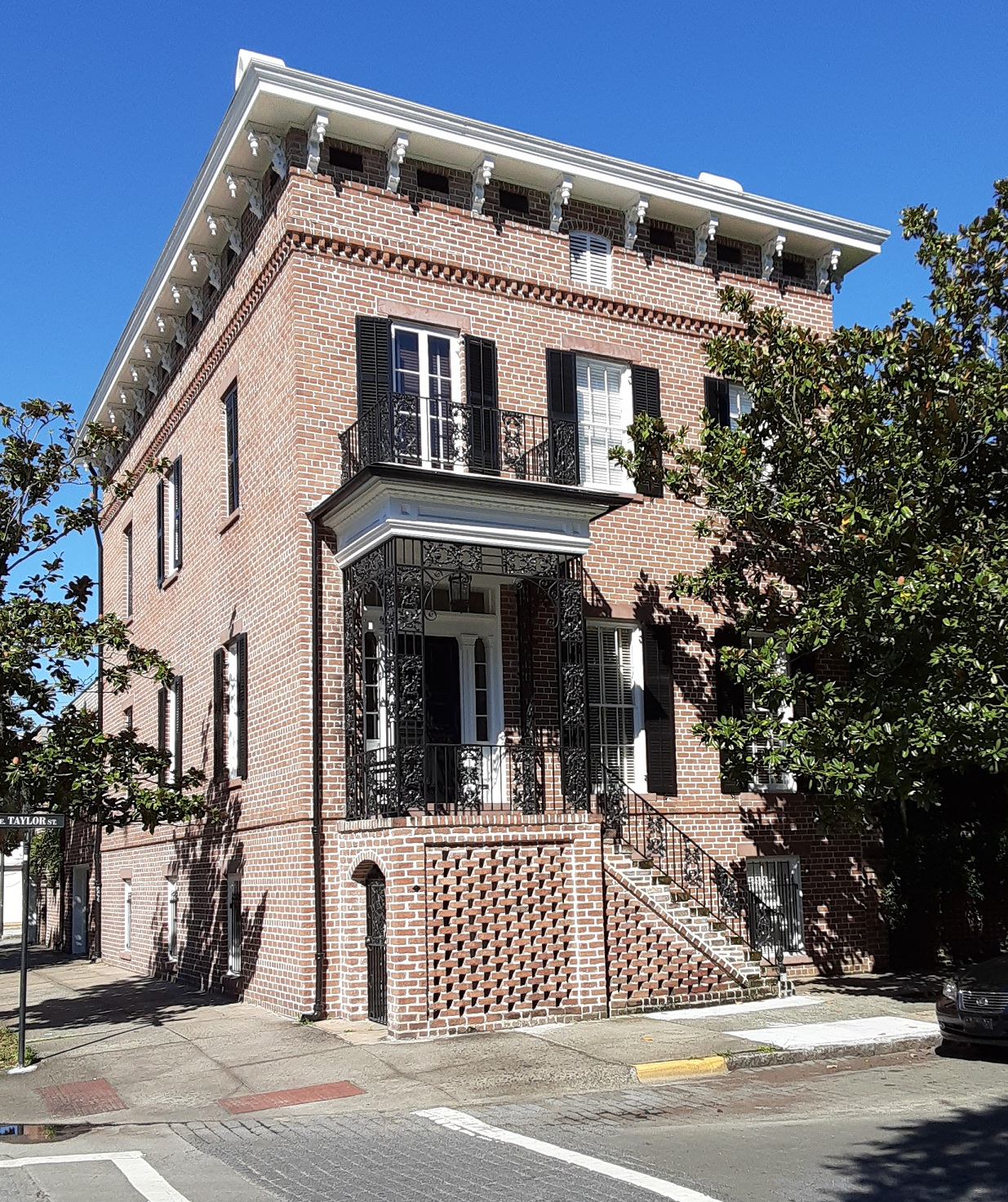
William Rogers House, 202 East Taylor Street

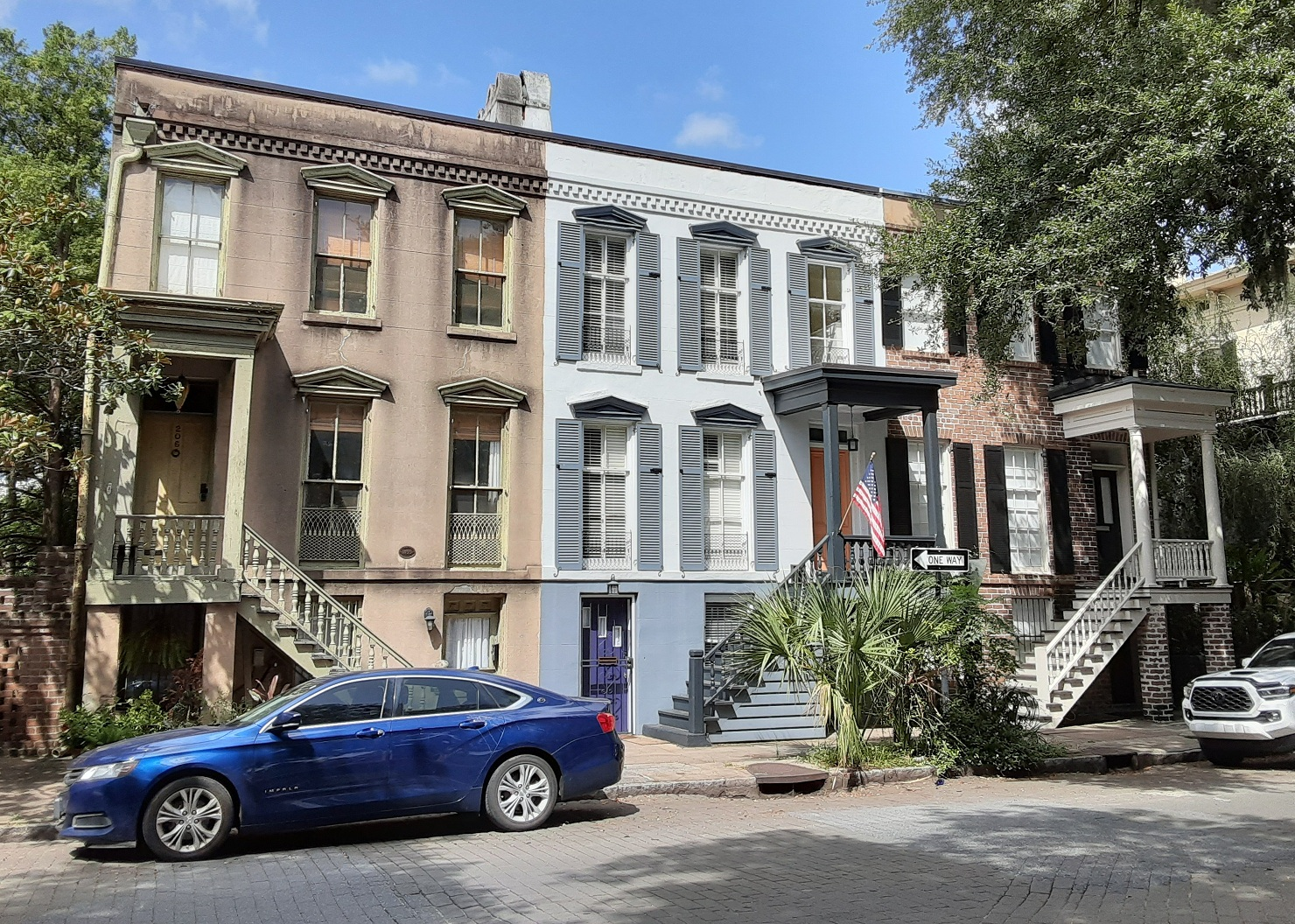
George Ash Row House (1), 206–210 East Taylor Street

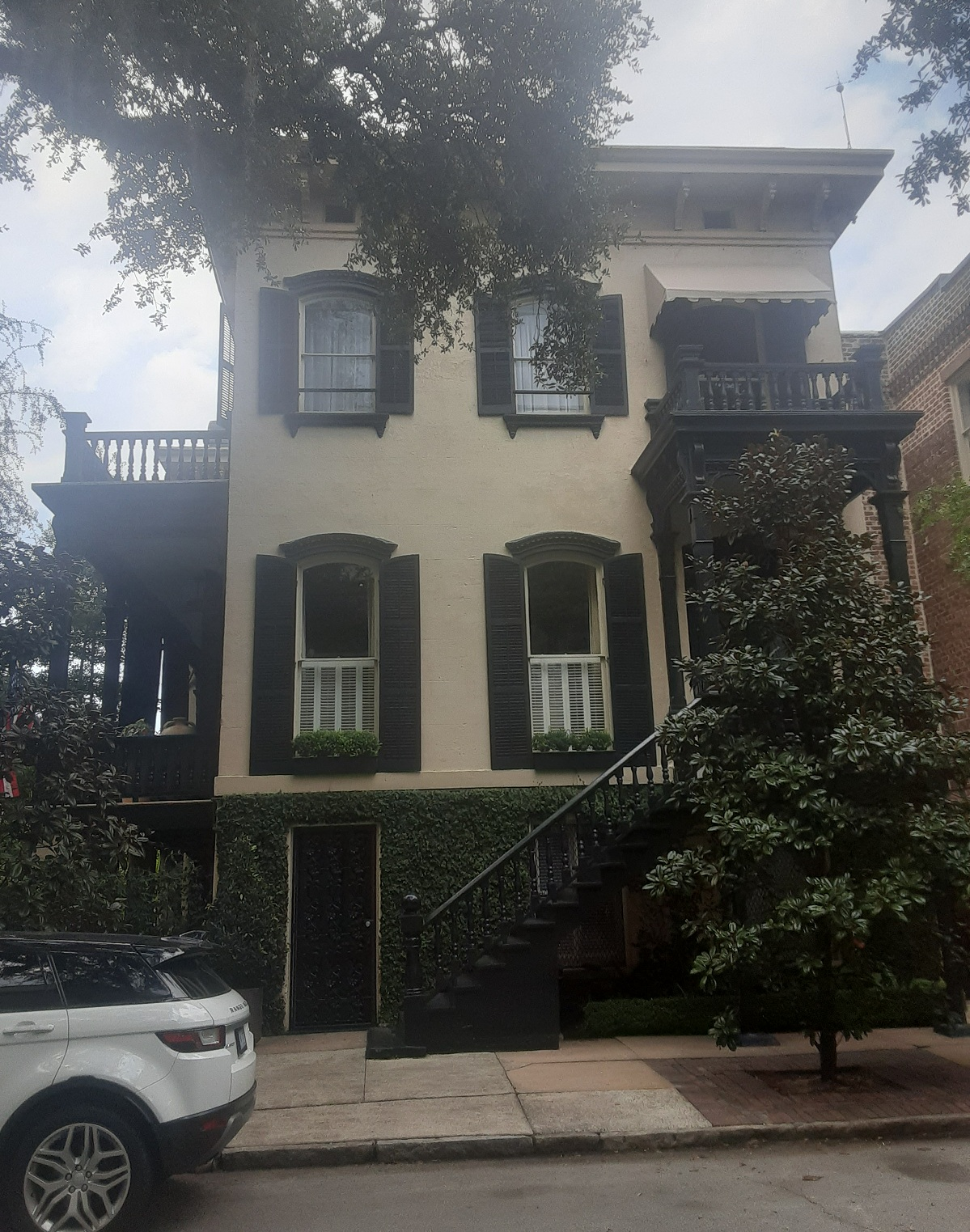
Andrew Hanley House, 214 East Taylor Street

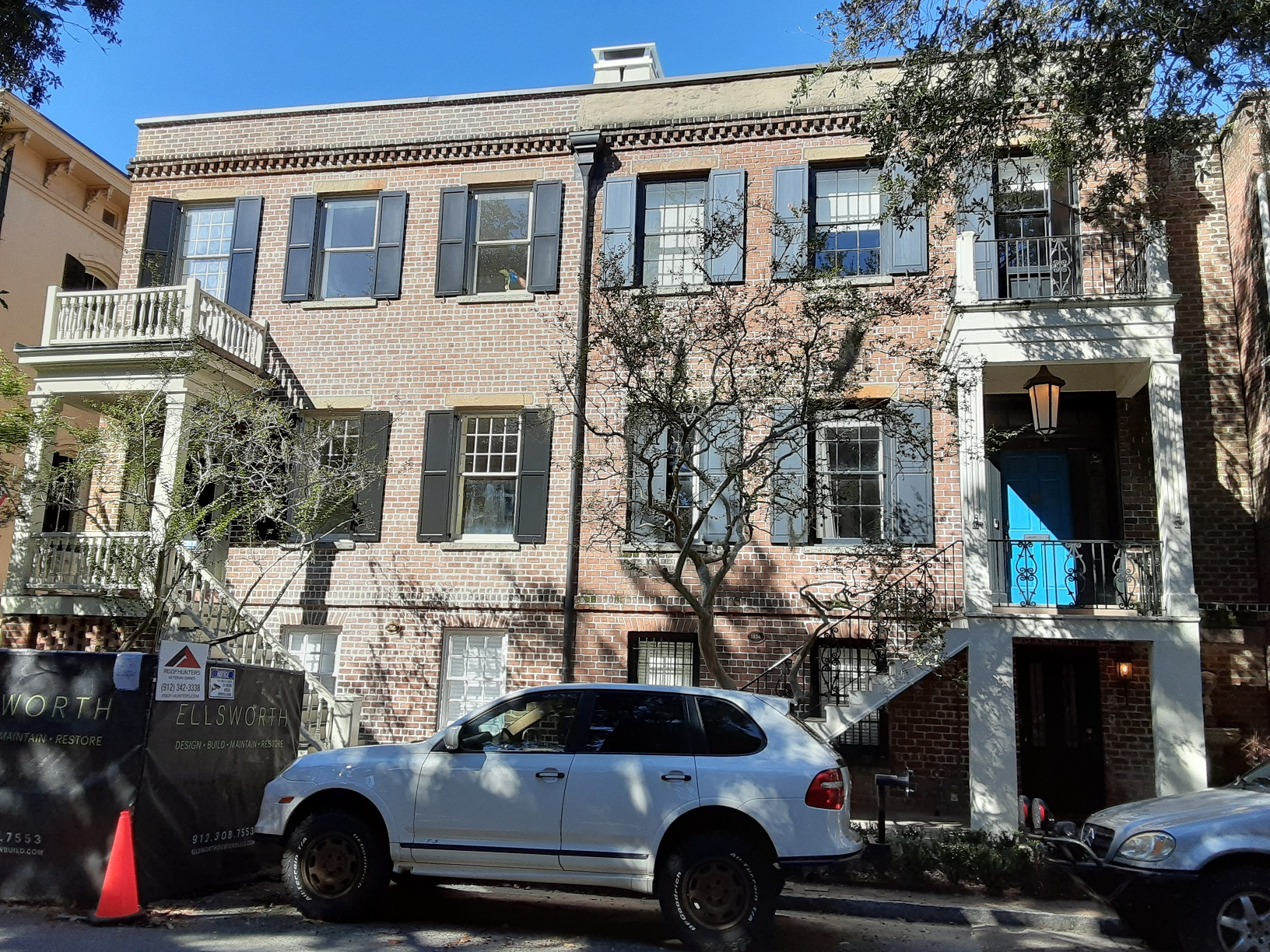
George Ash & Francis Grimball Duplex, 216–218 East Taylor Street

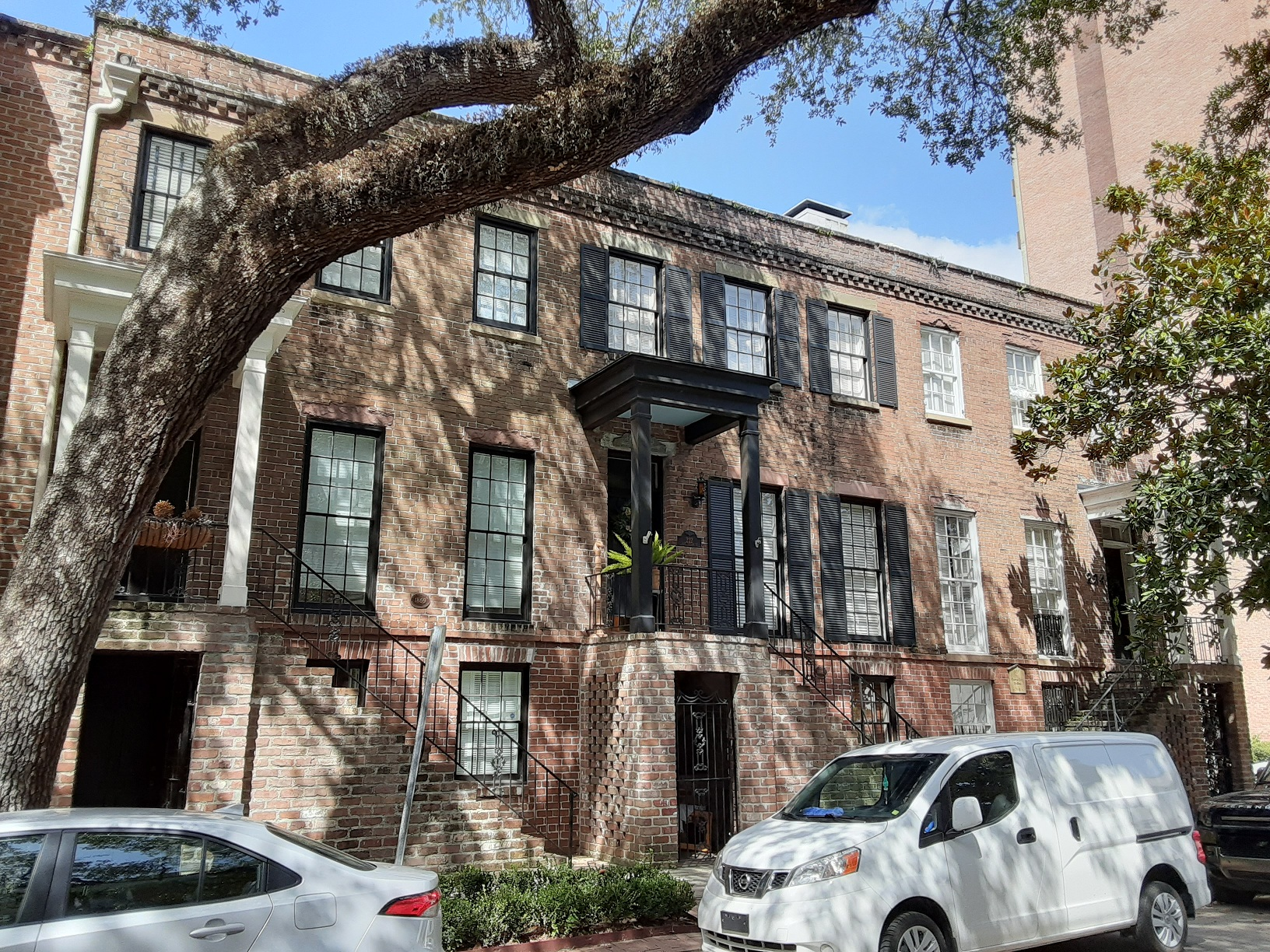
George Ash Row House (2), 220–224 East Taylor Street

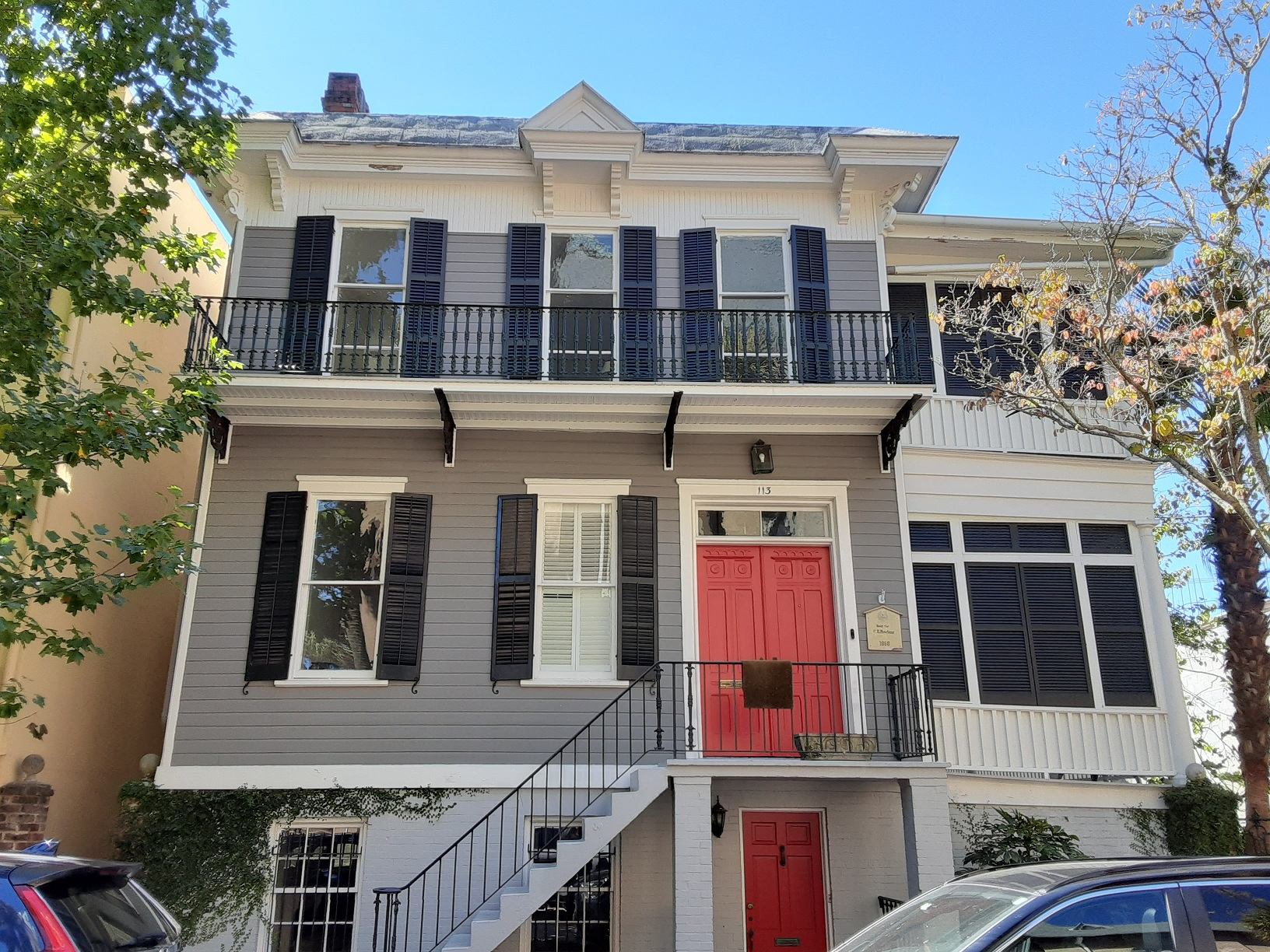
Charles Hutchins House, 113 East Gordon Street

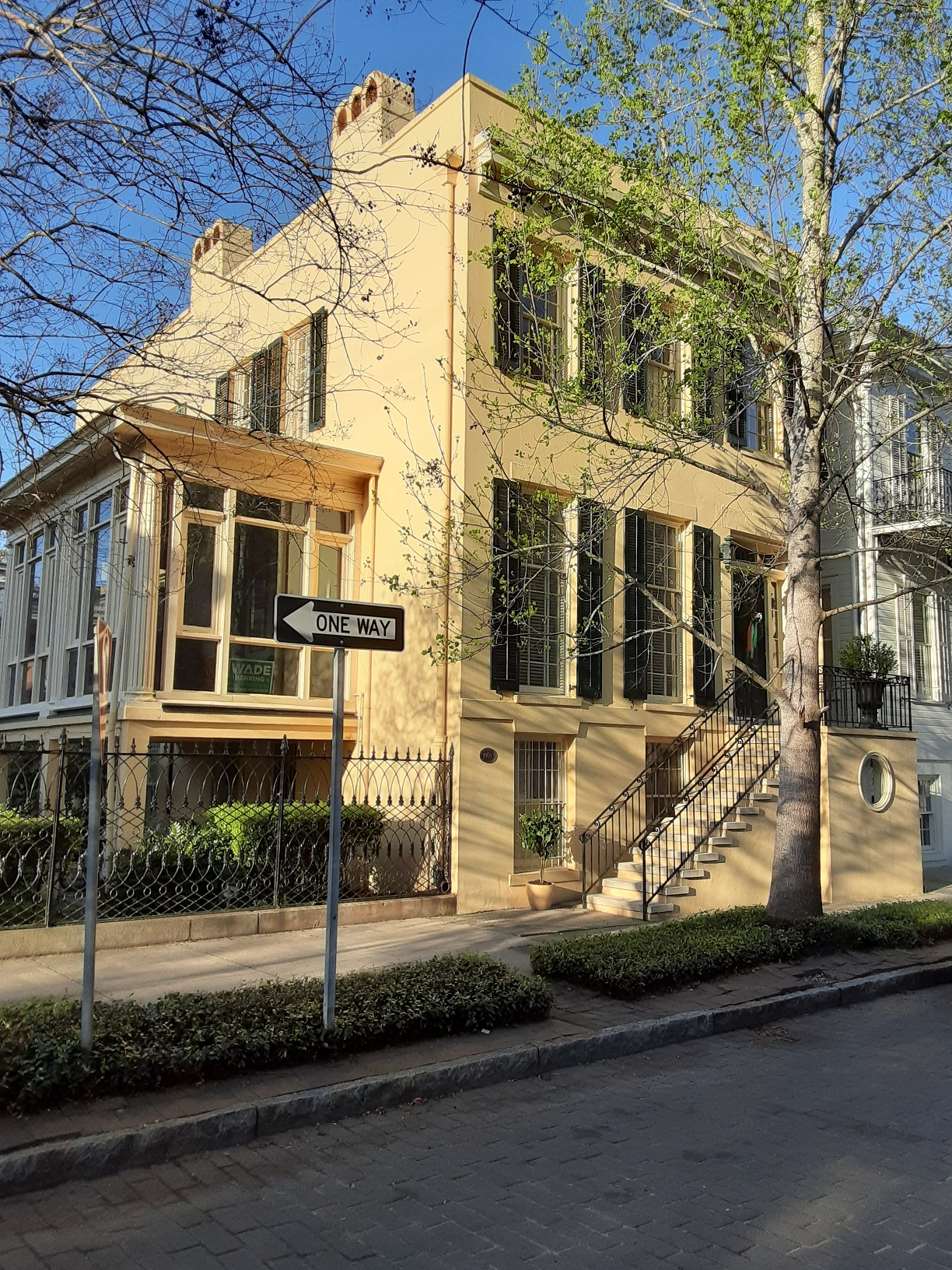
Adolphus Gomm House, 115 East Gordon Street

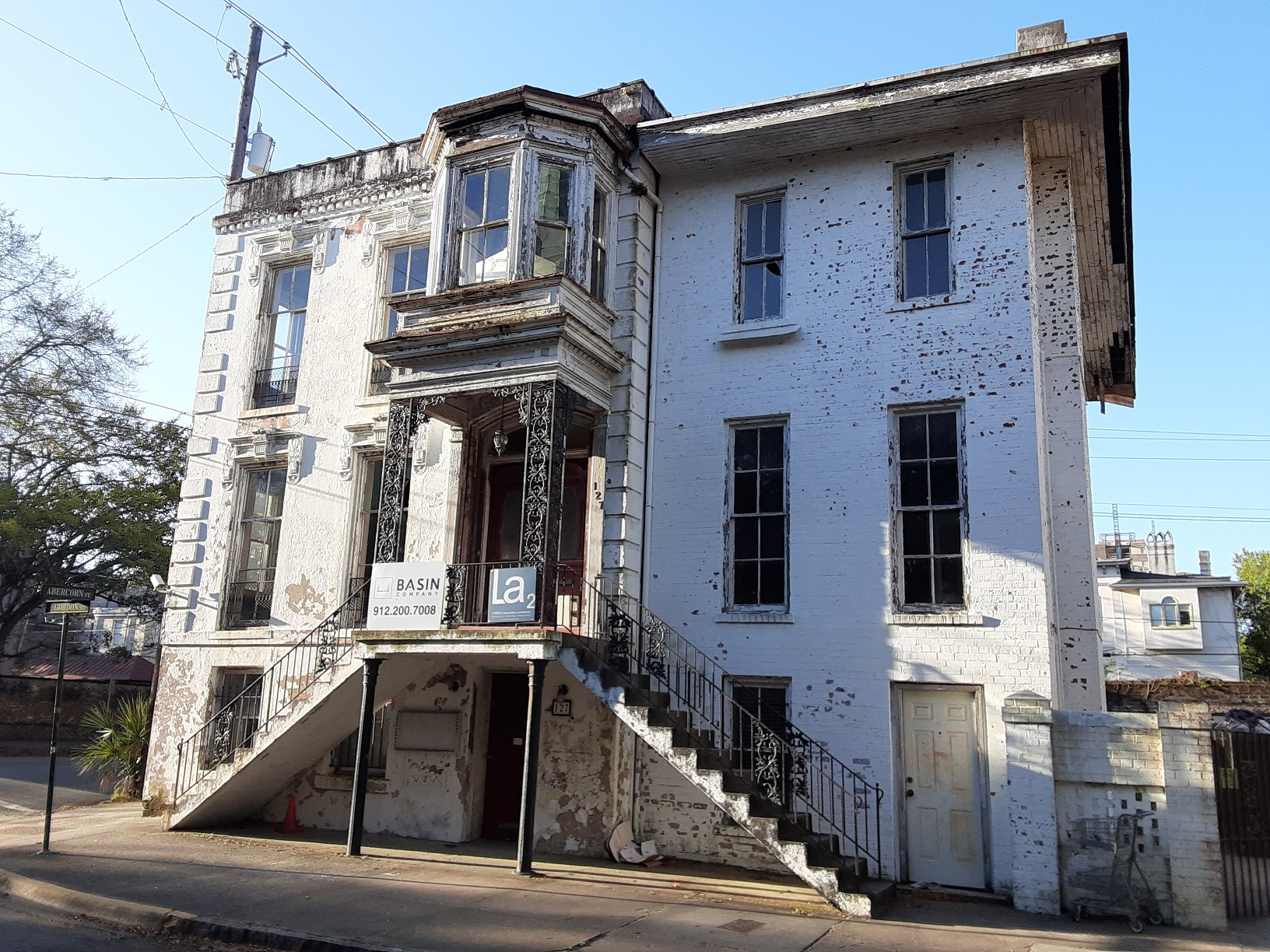
John B. Berry House, 127 East Gordon Street

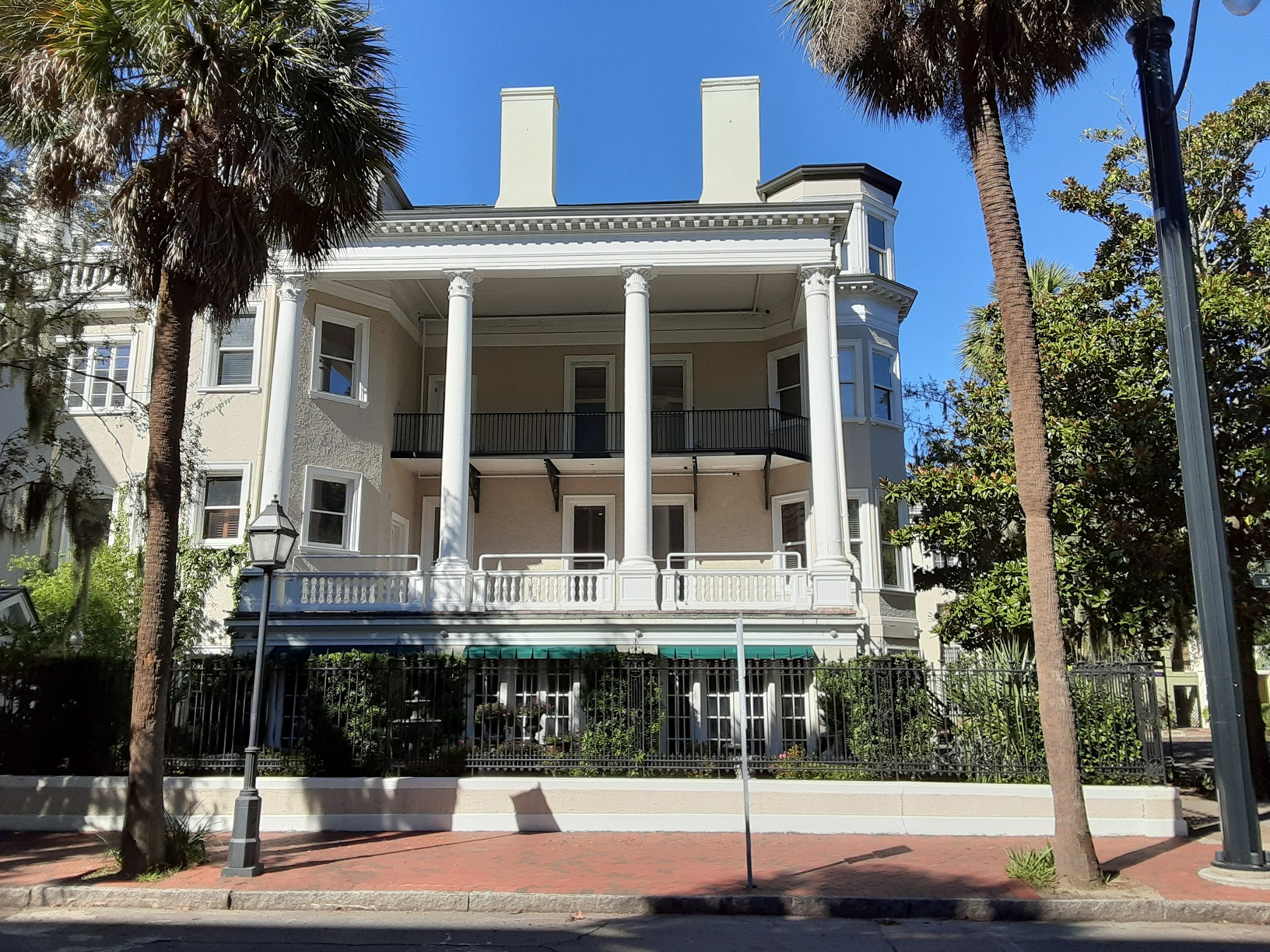
Sara Clark House, 421 Abercorn Street

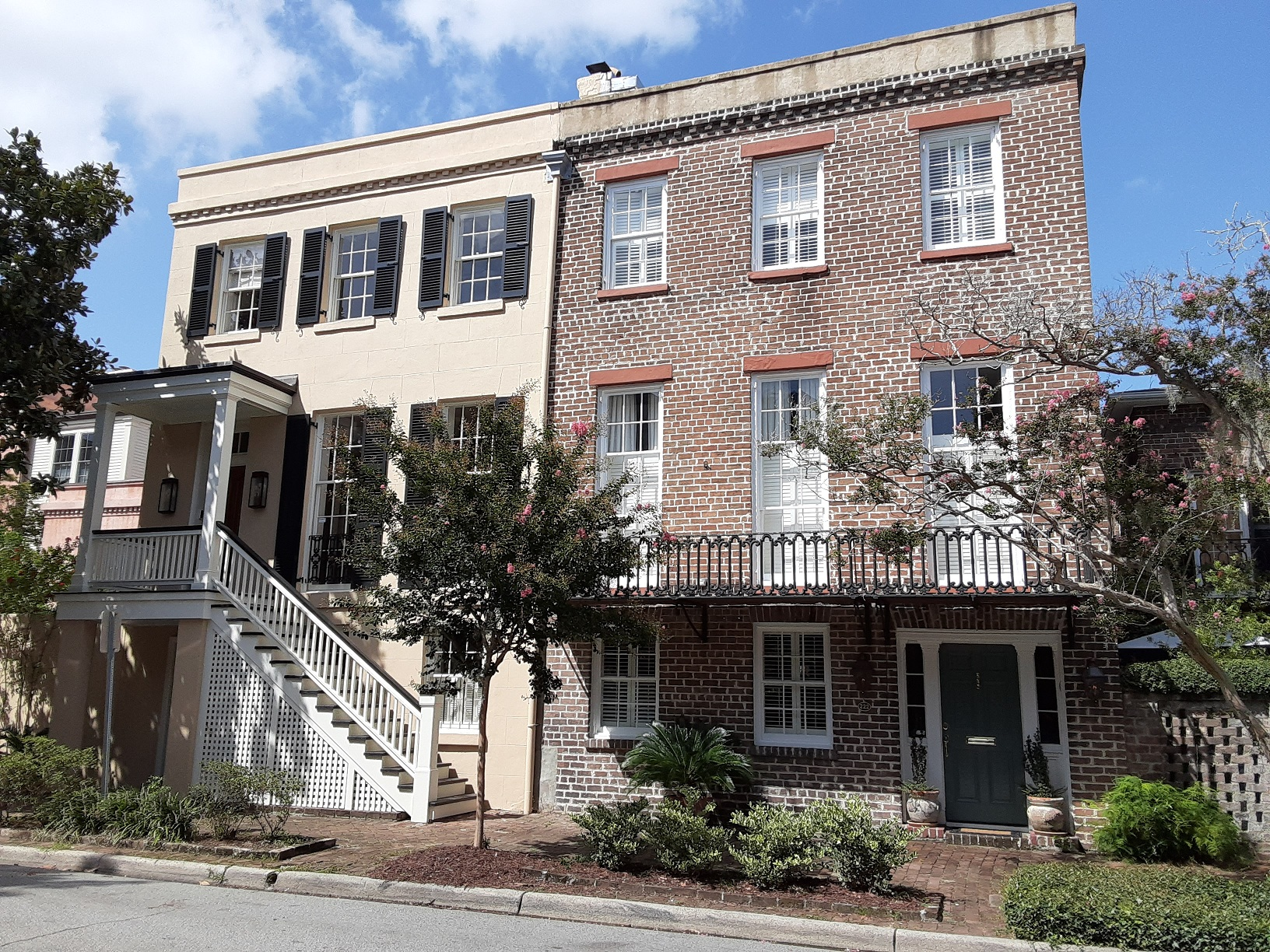
Edward Purse Duplex, 220–222 East Gordon Street

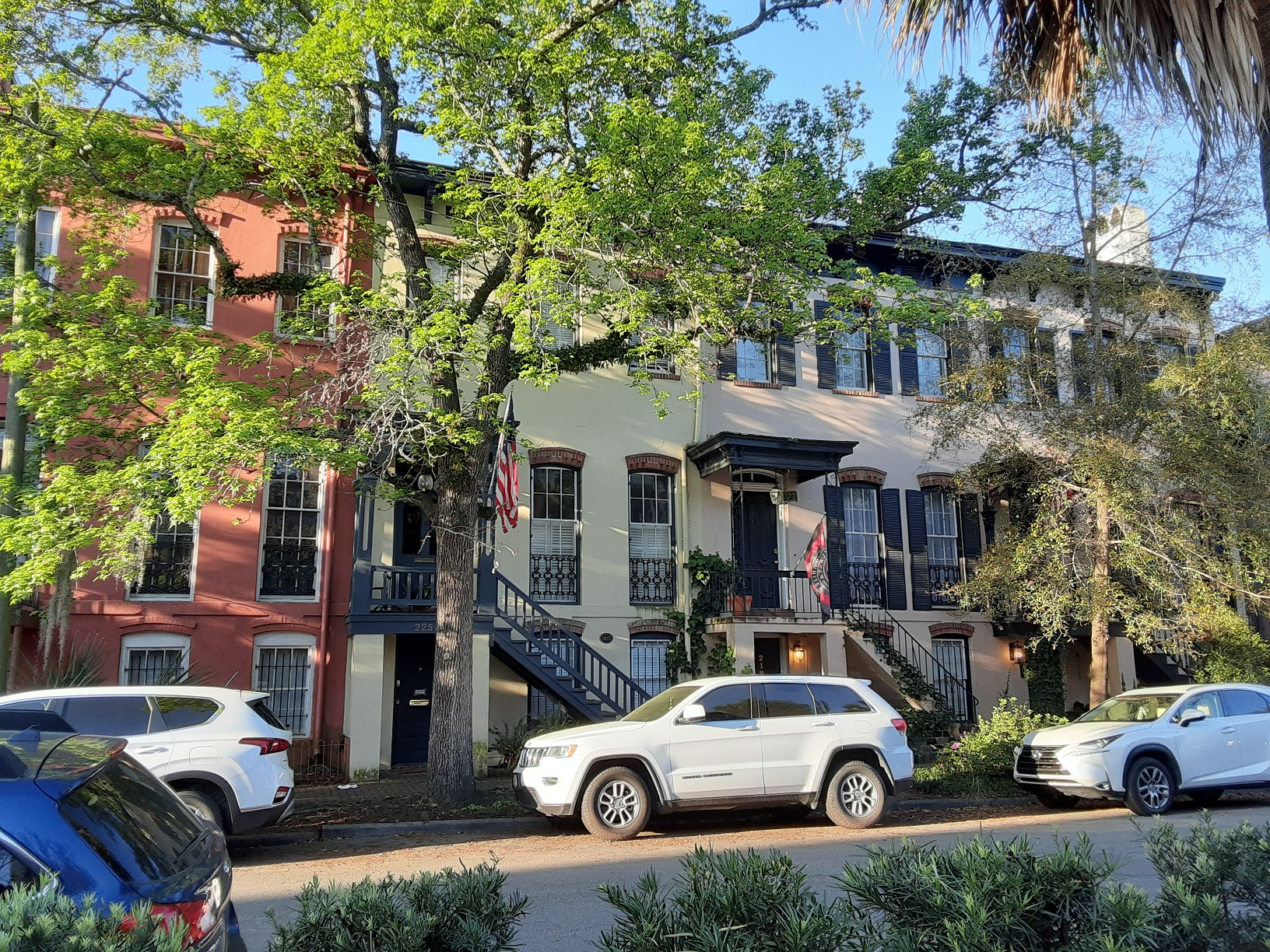
John Guerrard Row House, 215–229 East Gordon Street

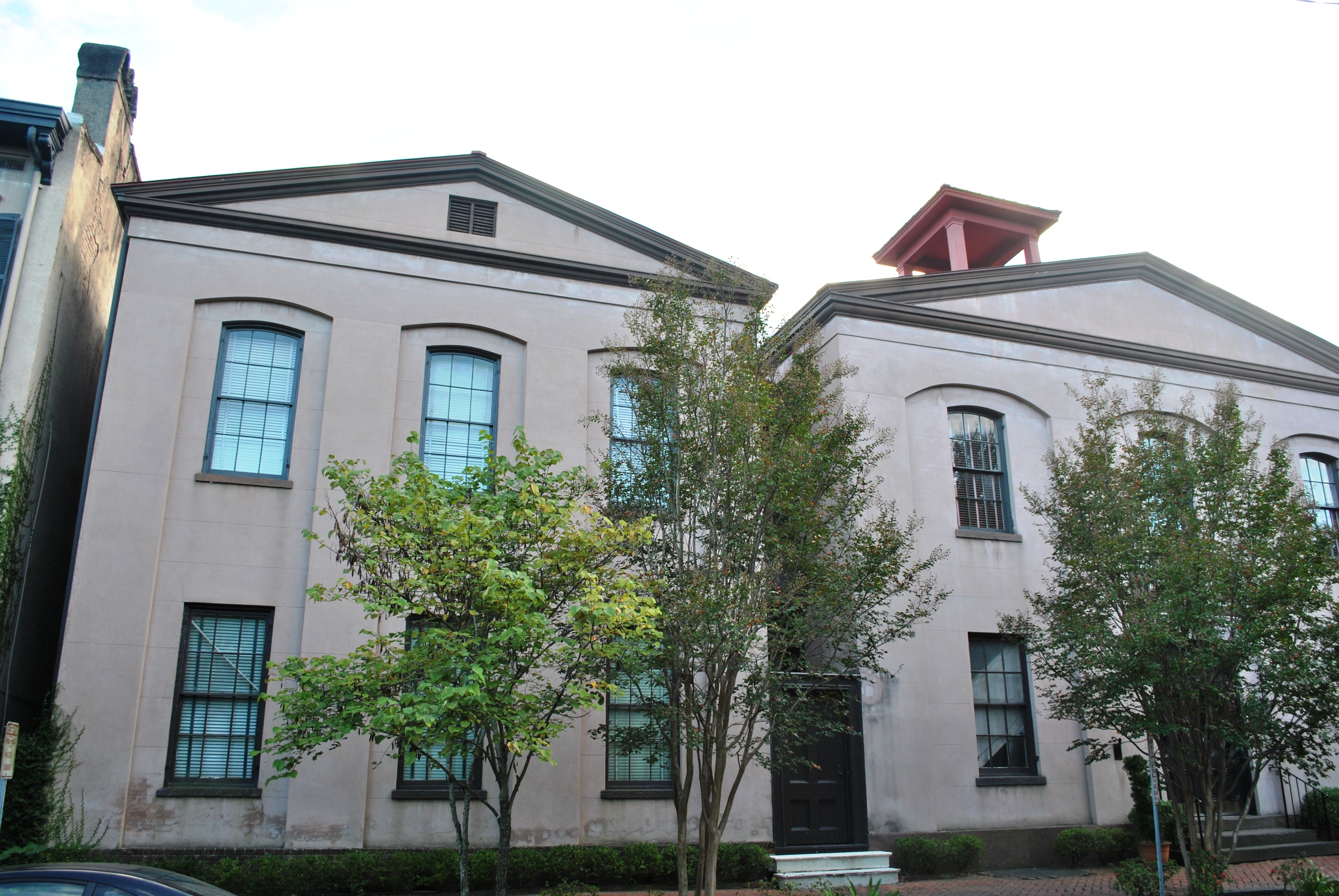
Massie Common School House, 201–213 East Gordon Street

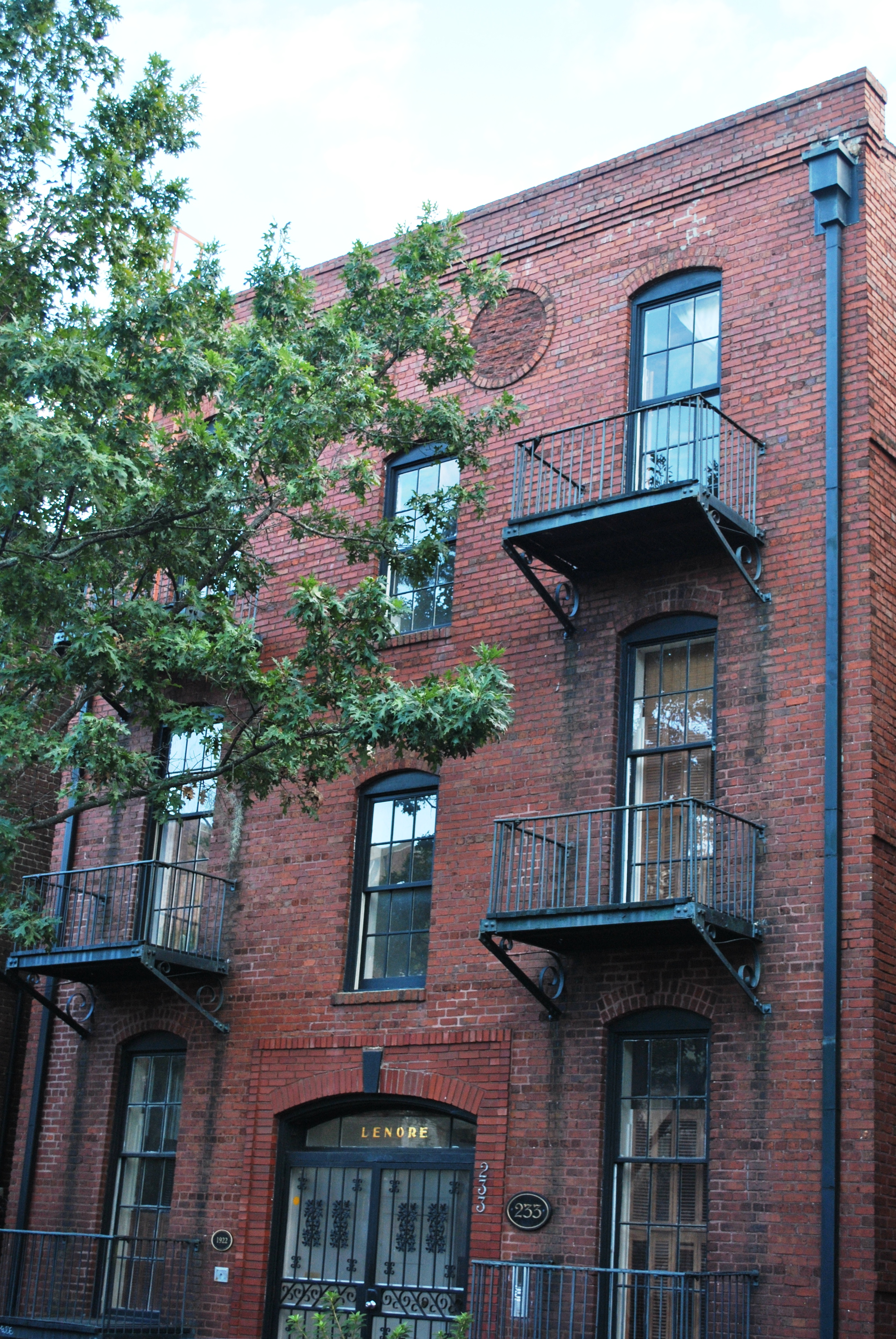
Lengre Building, 233 East Gordon Street

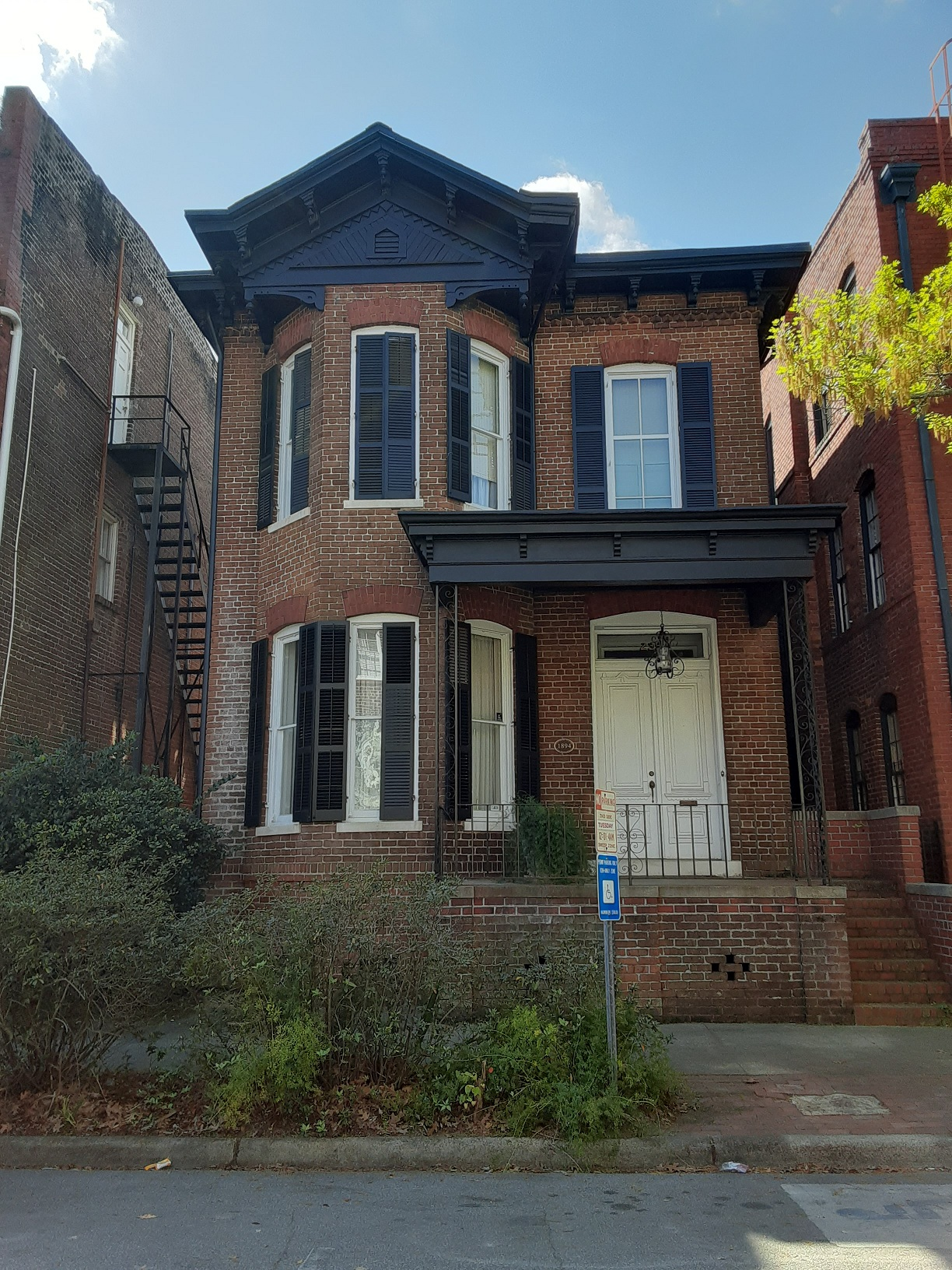
Flora Max House, 235 East Gordon Street

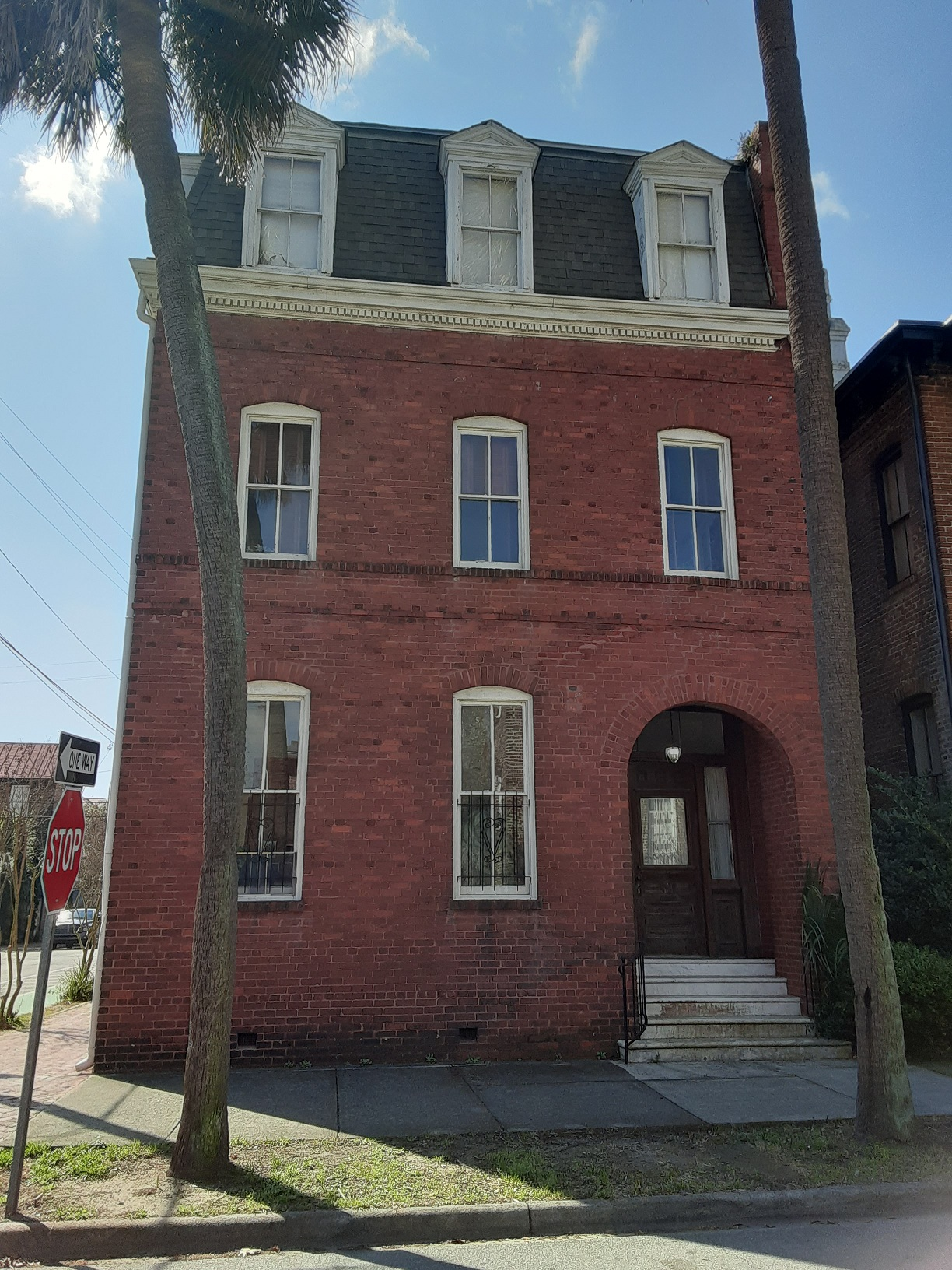
Thomas Davis House, 237 East Gordon Street

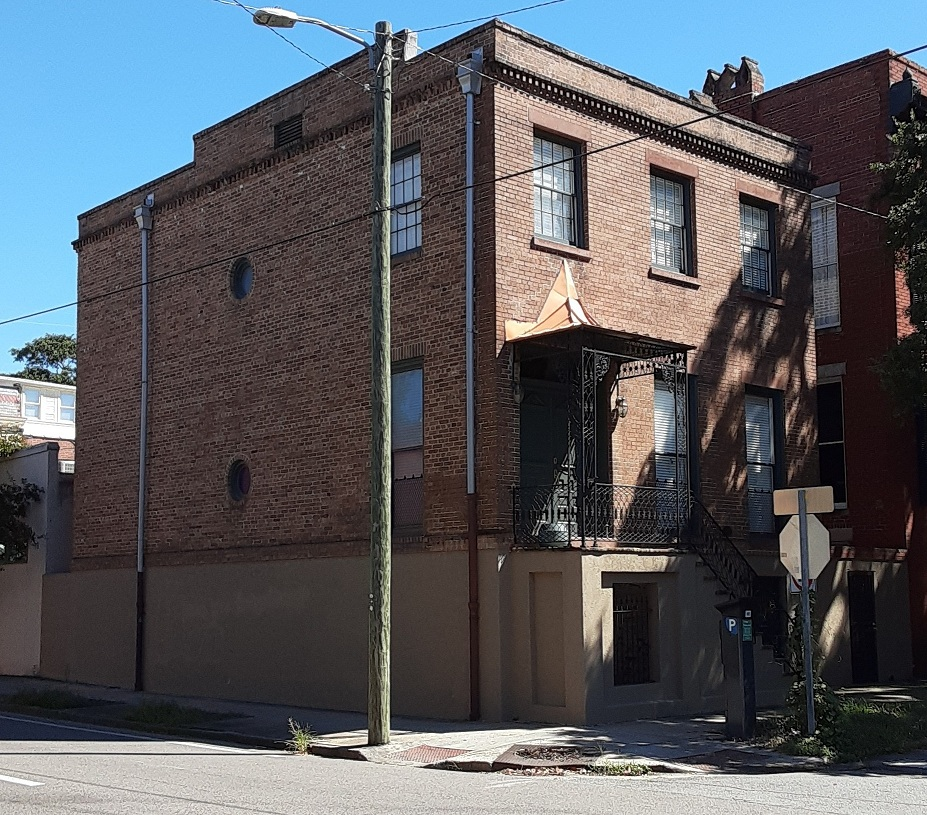
Alexander Bennett House, 102 East Taylor Street

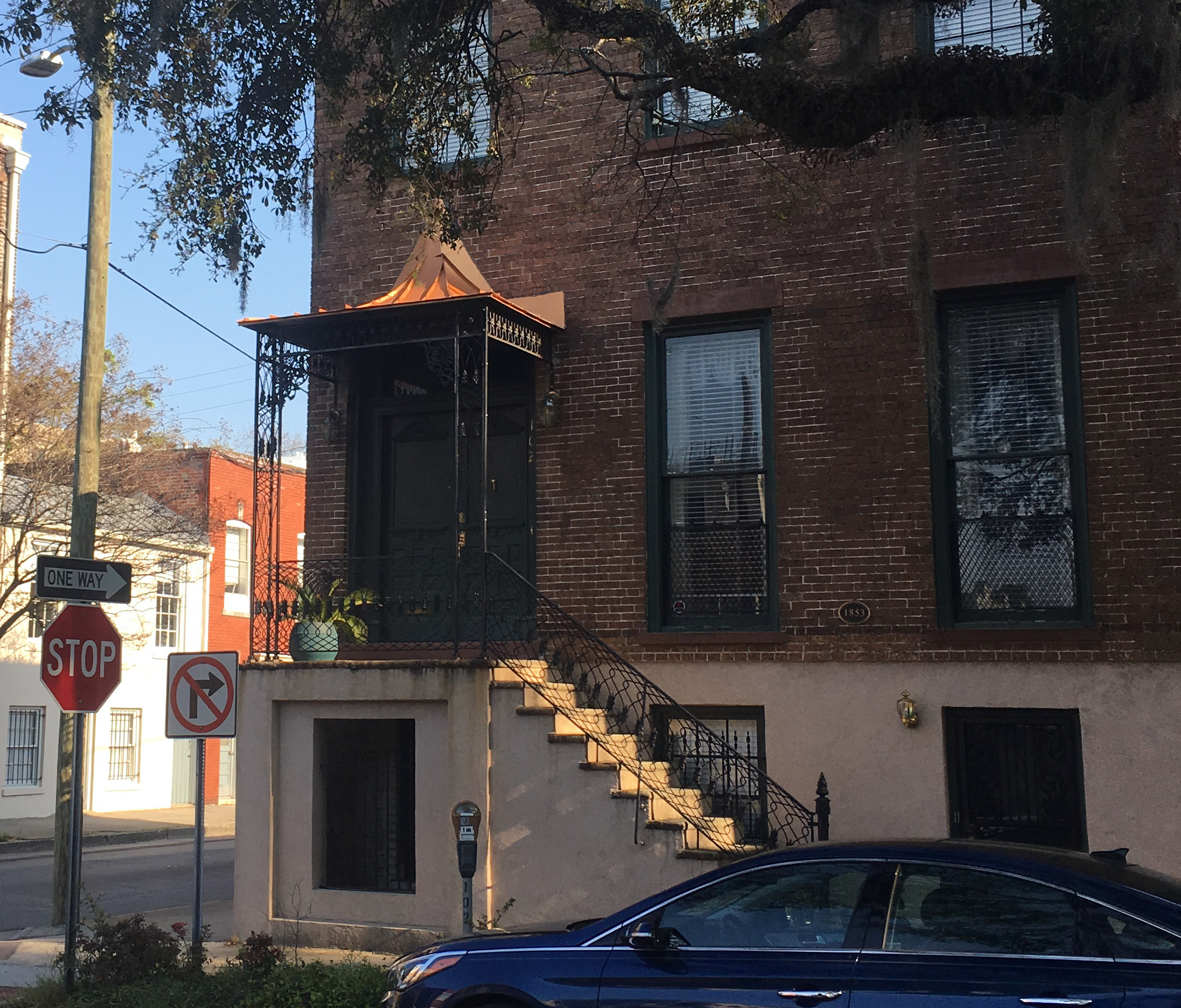
Another view of 102 East Taylor Street

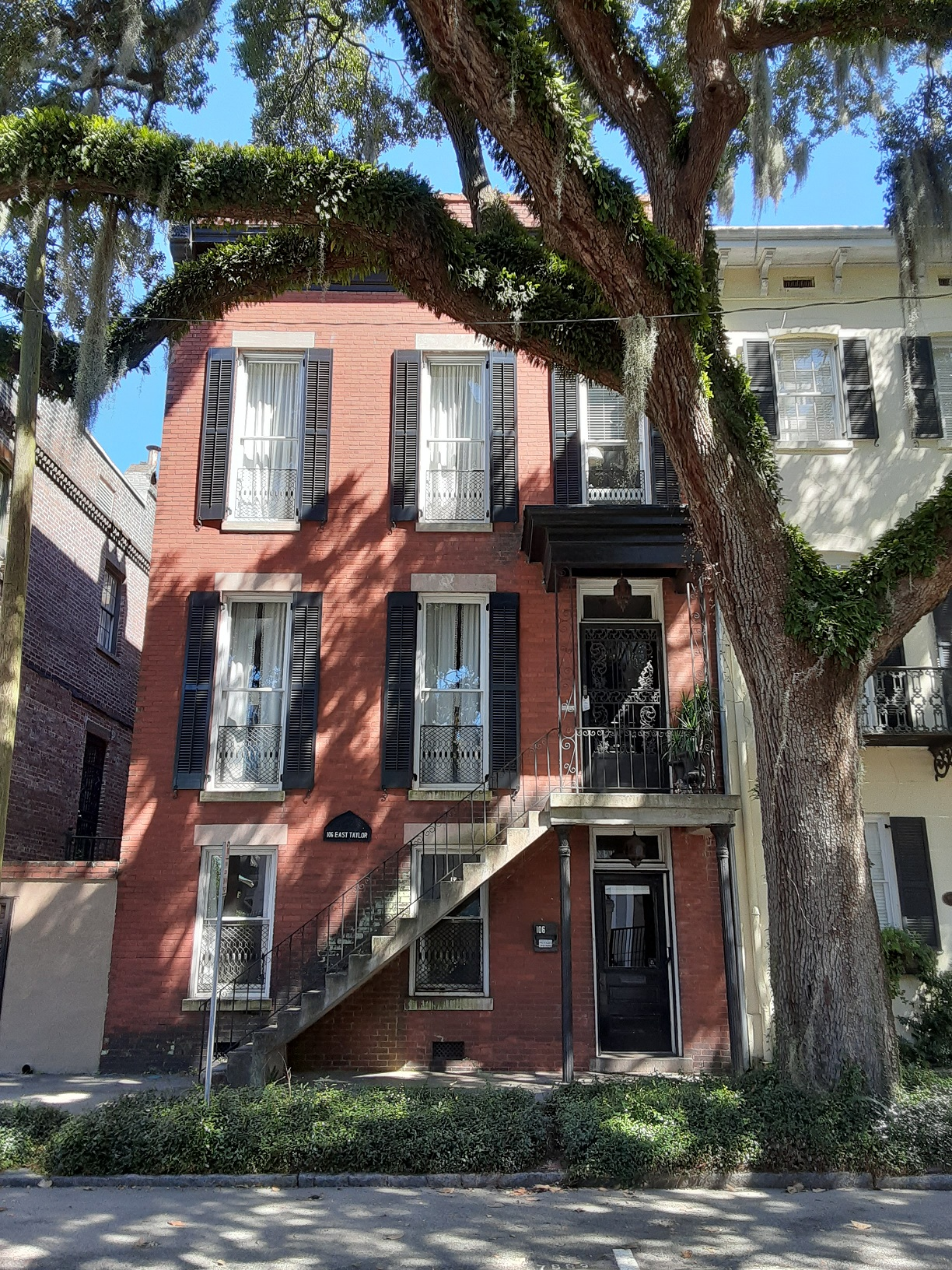
John Kuck House, 106 East Taylor Street

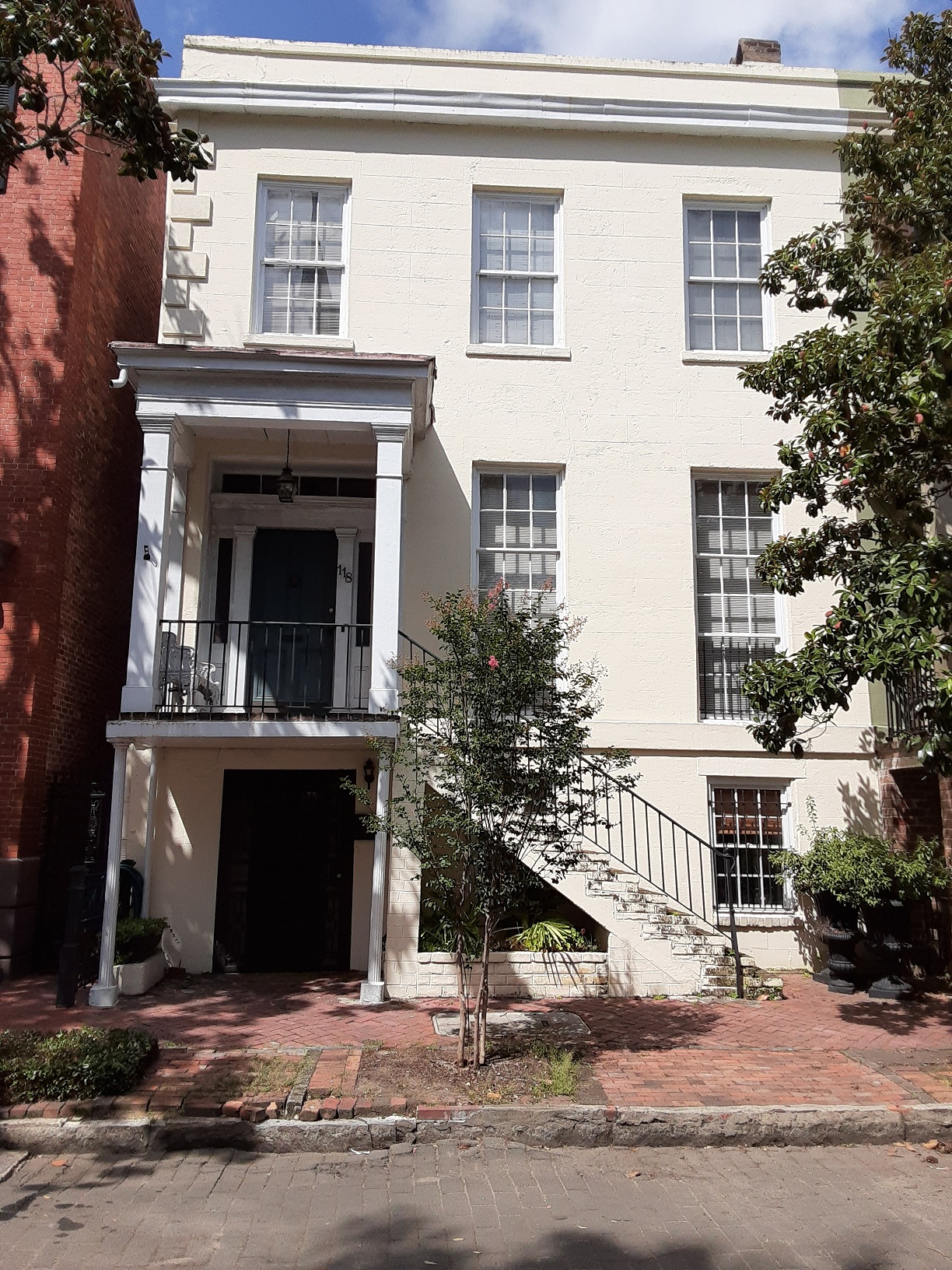
Adam Short Property, 118–120 East Taylor Street

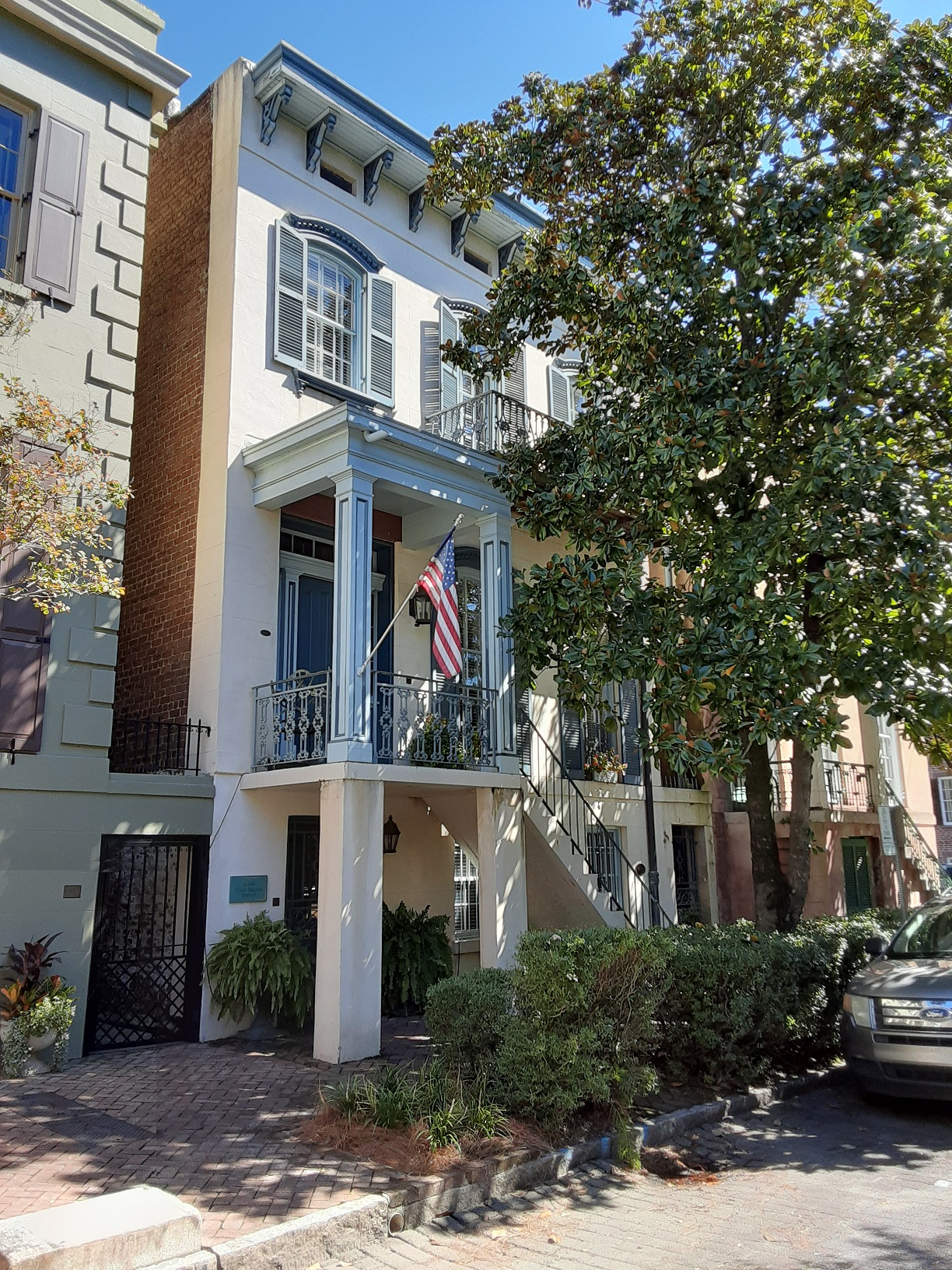
Mary Demere (Estate of) House, 126 East Taylor Street

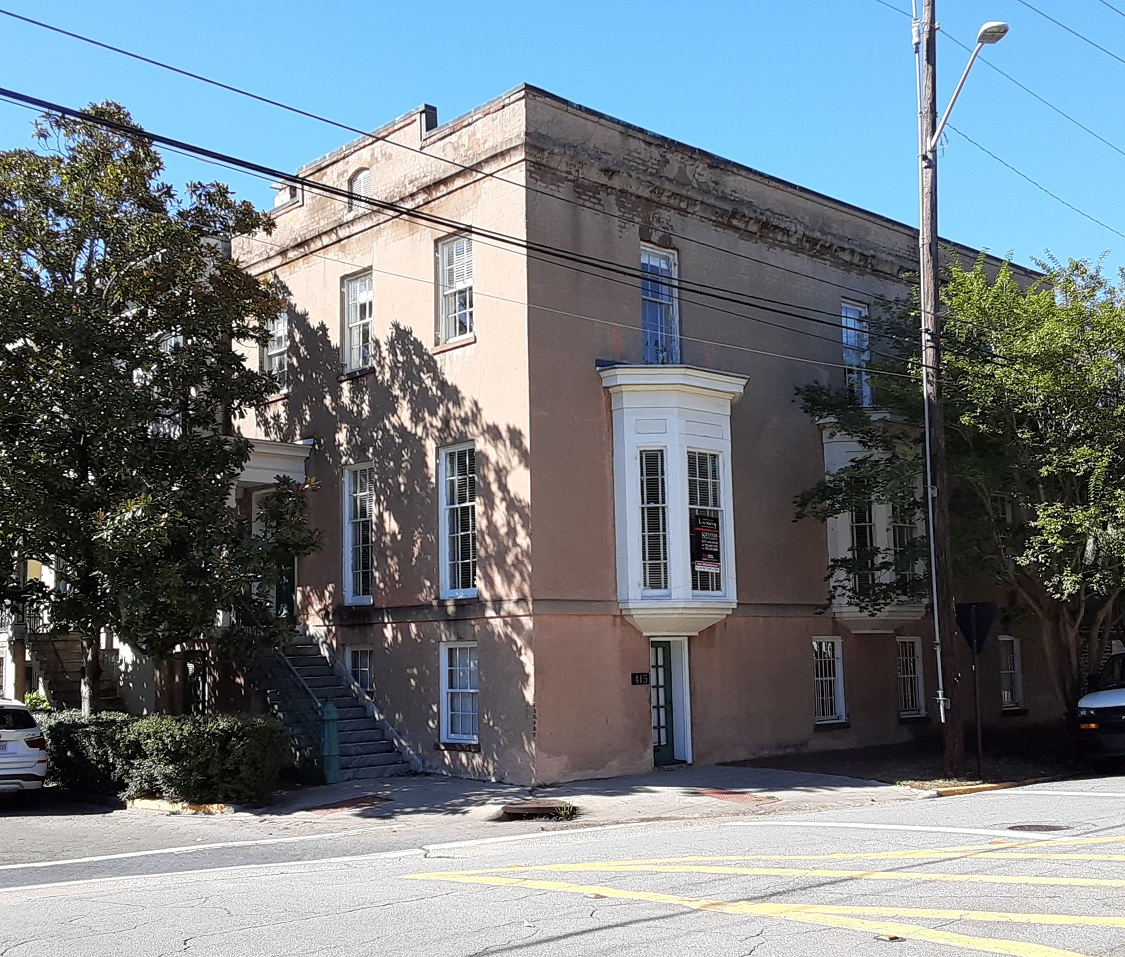
Mary Demere House, 128 East Taylor Street
