= Wesley Monumental United Methodist Church =

Historic church in Georgia, United States

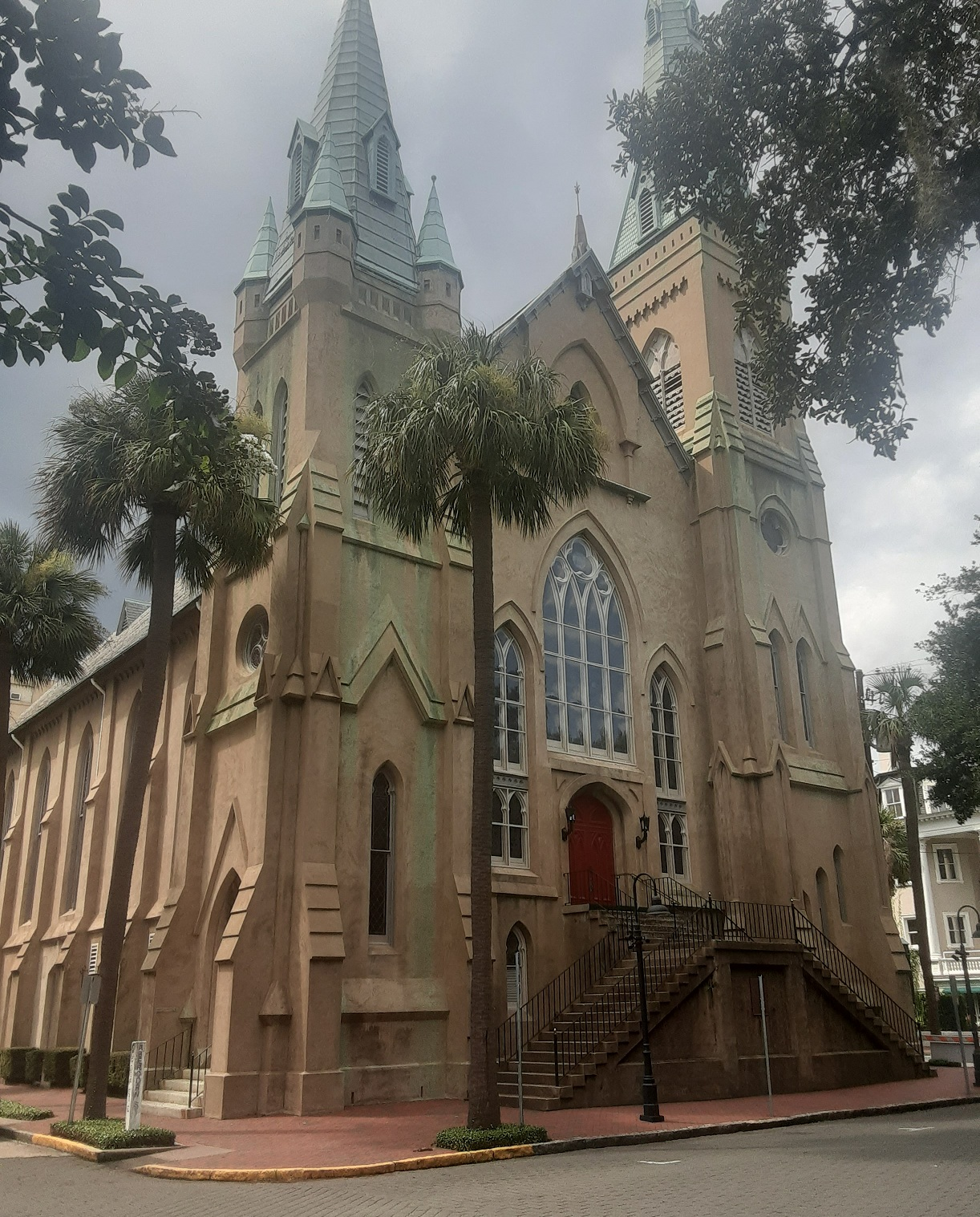
- The church in 2021
- Wesley Monumental United Methodist Church
- 32.07080°N 81.09331°W
- Location: Savannah, Georgia, U.S.
- Website: https://www.wesleymonumental.org/

Architecture
- Architect: Dixon and Carson
- Completed: 1890 (136 years ago)

Wesley Monumental United Methodist Church is a Methodist church in Savannah, Georgia, United States. Located in Taylor Square, at 429 Abercorn Street, the building's first floor was completed in 1875, with the second floor added in 1878. The church was completed in 1890. Its spire and stucco were added five years later.

The church is dedicated to John Wesley and Charles Wesley, the founders of Methodism, who came to Savannah in the 1730s. The church's design is based on that of Nieuwe Kerk in Amsterdam, Netherlands.

In 1968, a centennial marker noting the 1868 foundation of the church's congregation was placed on an exterior wall of the church.

An earlier, octagonal church (known as the "Coffeepot") was located further west in the same trust lot from 1854. Fourteen years later, a mission group from Trinity Methodist Church purchased the property. They hired Dixon and Carson, architects from Baltimore, to design a new church which was to fill the eastern two-thirds of the lot.

== See also ==
- Buildings in Savannah Historic District
