= 1896 Cedar Keys hurricane =

Category 3 Atlantic hurricane in 1896

1896 Cedar Key hurricane
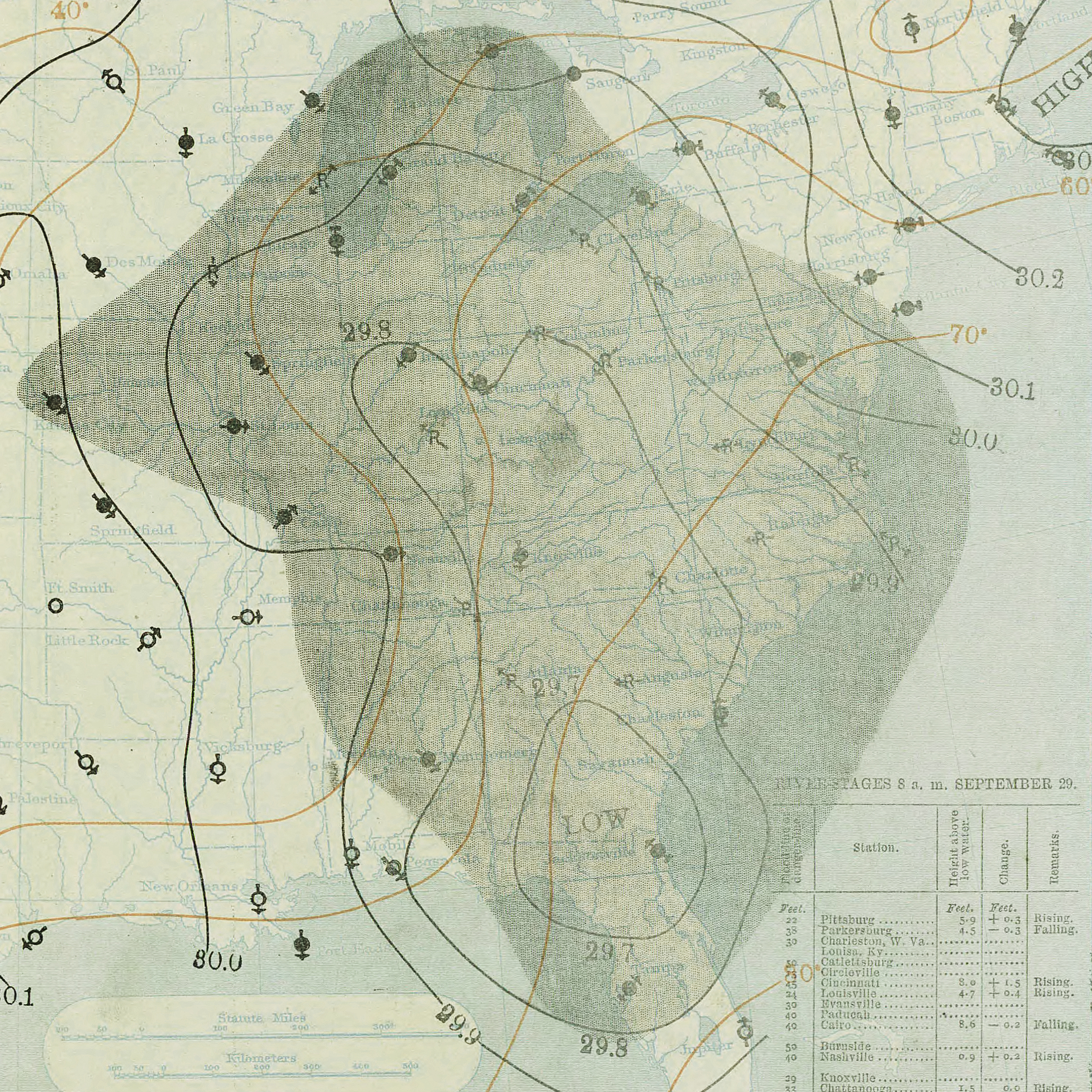
- Surface weather analysis of the eastern United States on September 29, showing the hurricane, denoted by "LOW", and its associated precipitation (shading)

Meteorological history
- Formed: September 22, 1896
- Dissipated: September 30, 1896

Category 3 major hurricane
- 1-minute sustained (SSHWS/NWS)
- Highest winds: 125 mph (205 km/h)
- Lowest pressure: 960 mbar (hPa); 28.35 inHg

Overall effects
- Fatalities: 202
- Damage: >$9.6 million (1896 USD) (equivalent to $372 million in 2025)
- Areas affected: Jamaica • Cuba • Florida • Georgia • the Carolinas • Mid-Atlantic states • New York • Great Lakes
- Part of the 1896 Atlantic hurricane season

The 1896 Cedar Keys hurricane was a powerful and destructive tropical cyclone that devastated much of the East Coast of the United States, starting with Florida's Cedar Keys, near the end of September 1896. The storm's rapid movement allowed it to maintain much of its intensity after landfall and cause significant damage over a broad area; as a result, it became one of the costliest United States hurricanes at the time. The fourth tropical cyclone of the 1896 Atlantic hurricane season, it formed by September 22, likely from a tropical wave, before crossing the Caribbean Sea just south of the Greater Antilles. It entered the Gulf of Mexico as the equivalent of a major hurricane on the Saffir–Simpson scale, and struck the Cedar Keys—an offshore island chain that includes the island and city of Cedar Key—early on the morning of September 29 with winds of 125 mph (205 km/h). The area was inundated by a devastating 10.5 ft (3.2 m) storm surge that undermined buildings, washed out the connecting railroad to the mainland, and submerged the smaller, outlying islands, where 31 people were killed. Strong winds also destroyed many of the red cedar trees that played an important role in the economy of the region. No hurricane would hit this region of Florida with a similar strength until 2023.

The cyclone continued inland over the Suwannee River valley, causing widespread destruction in dozens of communities across interior northern Florida; in the hardest-hit settlements, intense winds left few trees or buildings standing. The hurricane razed 5,000 sq mi (13,000 km^{2}) of dense pine forests in northern Florida, crippling the turpentine industry. Crops and livestock were destroyed, and thousands of individuals were left homeless. The storm killed at least 70 people in mainland Florida, while inflicting approximately $3 million (equivalent to $116 million in 2025) in property damage across the state. Speeding north, the hurricane ravaged southeastern Georgia and the Sea Islands. In Savannah, a 45-minute onslaught of fierce winds unroofed thousands of structures. Parks, cemeteries, and streets in the city were littered with fallen trees, and the Savannah River saw dozens of wrecked boats. At least 37 people in Georgia died. Strong winds and high tides battered southeastern South Carolina, ruining rice crops and peeling off roofs. The storm then tracked through mostly rural sectors of North Carolina and did significant wind damage in the Raleigh–Durham area.

Although the hurricane was weakening and transitioning into an extratropical cyclone late on September 29, its rapid forward movement contributed to high wind velocities across parts of the Mid-Atlantic states, with gusts approaching 100 mph (160 km/h). Additionally, torrential rains fell west of the storm's track. In Virginia, cities and agricultural districts alike suffered extensive damage. Flash flooding in the Shenandoah Valley culminated in the failure of an earthen dam upstream from Staunton, unleashing a torrent of water that swept houses from their foundations and ravaged the town's commercial district. In Washington, D.C., thousands of trees were uprooted or snapped, communications were severed, and localized streaks of violent gusts damaged many public and private buildings. The White House grounds were left in disarray. High tides in the Chesapeake Bay triggered flooding in coastal cities. In Pennsylvania, flooding rains and powerful wind gusts produced widespread destruction. Railroads in western parts of the state were plagued by washouts and landslides, while in southeastern areas, hundreds of barns were destroyed. The storm demolished a 5,390 ft (1,640 m) bridge over the Susquehanna River, while the Gettysburg Battlefield lost hundreds of trees, a few of which struck and damaged historical monuments. Strong winds extended as far east as Long Island. Heavy rainfall reached west into Ohio, and the hurricane's extratropical remnants wrought havoc on shipping in the Great Lakes. The storm caused at least 202 deaths and wrought more than $9.6 million (equivalent to $372 million in 2025) in damage.

== Meteorological history ==
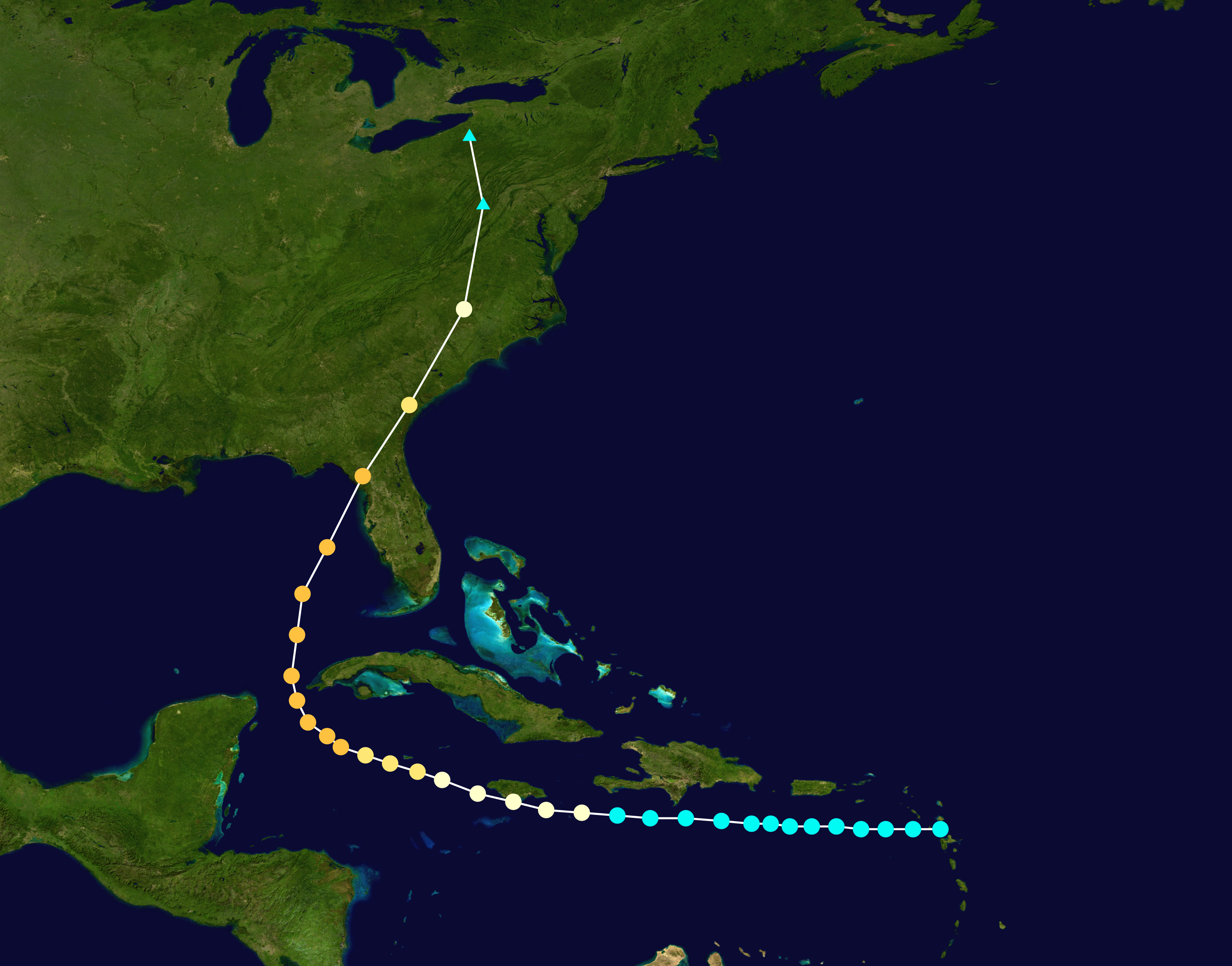
Map plotting the storm's track and intensity, according to the Saffir–Simpson scale Map key Saffir–Simpson scale Tropical depression (≤38 mph, ≤62 km/h) Tropical storm (39–73 mph, 63–118 km/h) Category 1 (74–95 mph, 119–153 km/h) Category 2 (96–110 mph, 154–177 km/h) Category 3 (111–129 mph, 178–208 km/h) Category 4 (130–156 mph, 209–251 km/h) Category 5 (≥157 mph, ≥252 km/h) Unknown Storm type Tropical cyclone Subtropical cyclone Extratropical cyclone, remnant low, tropical disturbance, or monsoon depression

Although little is known about the system prior to its passage through the Leeward Islands as a tropical storm on September 22, it likely originated from a tropical wave that exited the western coast of Africa. Its track has been re-analyzed multiple times since the early 20th century. For several days, the storm moved westward through the northern Caribbean Sea, passing just south of Jamaica as a low-end hurricane on September 25. The cyclone steadily intensified, turned northward, and moved through the Yucatán Channel on September 28. The aftermath of the storm in western Cuba was consistent with the effects of a Category 1 hurricane on the modern-day Saffir–Simpson scale, suggesting that the storm was a major hurricane of Category 3 intensity while passing west of the island. As the storm entered the Gulf of Mexico, it began to accelerate and curve toward the north-northeast.

In the early morning on September 29, the center of the hurricane made landfall on Cedar Key, Florida, with a minimum central pressure of 960 mb (28.35 inHg), and moved inland across Levy County. The cyclone possessed an unusually tight core, with a 17 mi (27 km) radius of maximum wind, and was traveling at a swift pace of about 35 mph (55 km/h). Consequently, its estimated maximum winds of 125 mph (205 km/h) were higher than pressure alone would suggest. The small but intense hurricane continued northeastward through northern Florida and southeastern Georgia, and its core contracted further; outside of a narrow corridor along the storm's track, winds were comparatively light. At Savannah, Georgia, air pressure fell 15 hPa (0.45 inHg) in 45 minutes as the storm center passed just to the west around midday on September 29. The system weakened as it sped northward through the Carolinas, but when it reached the Mid-Atlantic states on the evening of September 29, its increasingly rapid forward movement contributed to renewed wind violence. A band of heavy rain was observed along and west of the storm's track from northern North Carolina to southern Pennsylvania, with the heaviest totals exceeding 6 in (150 mm). As the storm transitioned into an extratropical cyclone by early on September 30, its envelope of damaging winds expanded. The extratropical system passed west of Washington, D.C., and progressed into central Pennsylvania, dissipating near the Southern Tier of New York. Its remnants continued into the St. Lawrence Valley, where they merged with another low pressure area.

== Impact and aftermath ==
Effects of the 1896 Cedar Keys hurricane by state
State	Deaths	Damage
Florida	115	$3 million
Georgia	37	$2.5 million
South Carolina	7	$25,000
North Carolina	1	$80,000
Virginia	13	>$1 million
Washington, D.C.	1	$400,000
Maryland	8	$500,000
Pennsylvania	16	$2 million
New York	0	$50,000
Great Lakes	4	$75,000
Totals	202	> $9.6 million

As the hurricane passed to the south and then to the west of Cuba, strong winds and heavy rain showers were reported along the length of the island, beginning with Santiago de Cuba. Winds reached hurricane force at Cape San Antonio, the western tip of Cuba, and 60 mph (100 km/h) at Havana. However, few details of the effects in Cuba are available.

The hurricane chiefly affected the eastern United States, impacting a broad region from Florida to New York over the course of just 24 hours. It was, at the time, one of the costliest hurricanes ever to strike the country.

=== Florida ===
Newspapers referred to the hurricane as the "worst ever known" in Florida. It caused at least $3 million (equivalent to $116 million in 2025) in property damage throughout the state, and estimates of the number of individuals left homeless by the storm ran as high as 10,000 to 12,000.

==== Cedar Keys and Levy County ====
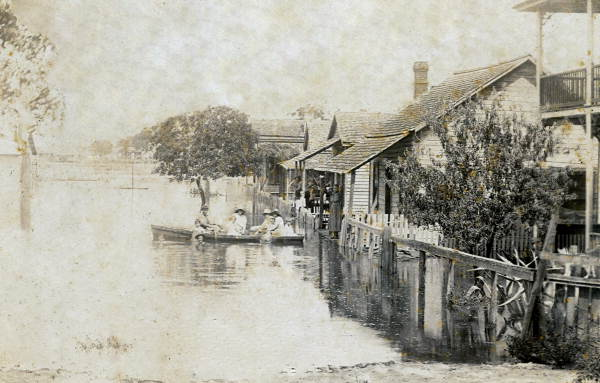
Residents of Cedar Key rowing a boat through residual floodwaters after the hurricane

While the hurricane was still in the Gulf of Mexico on September 28, the Norwegian barque Saturn foundered off Key West. Her crew was rescued by a steamship and brought to New York City. As the storm came ashore, the Cedar Keys were struck by a 10.5 ft (3.2 m) storm surge that victims often erroneously called a "tidal wave." Yankeetown received an even higher storm surge of 12.6 ft (3.8 m). The main street through the center of Cedar Key—the most populous island in the Cedar Keys island chain—was severely flooded by 8 ft (2.4 m) of water, which invaded every building and left large sinkholes when it receded. Sidewalks along the street were washed out. The surge of water undermined the foundations of stone buildings, weakening many of them to the point of collapse, while sweeping away weaker structures. Inside the buildings left intact, mud was sometimes found several feet deep. The hurricane also contaminated wells with seawater and debris, so residents were forced to travel for clean water. Hardest-hit were the small outlying islands, which were fully submerged by the storm surge and "completely cleared out". Survivors often braced against young, supple trees that were able to withstand the storm's force, or used pieces of debris as flotation devices.

Powerful winds added to the destruction by damaging or leveling numerous churches and houses that managed to remain out of the flood's reach. The hurricane's cumulative force wrecked at least 100 homes on Cedar Key, and damaged or destroyed every building on nearby Atsena Otie Key. A fire broke out during the storm and reduced two large Cedar Key hotels to mounds of coquina. When the storm abated, streets were strewn with piles of debris, including trees, roofs, railroad ties, and boats. A large ship called the Luna Davis was tossed ashore and sat in the middle of Cedar Key's business district for weeks after the storm. Interests in shellfish harvesting took a significant blow, as the hurricane ruined oyster beds and carried most fishing boats out to sea. The 4 mi (6.4 km) stretch of the Florida Central and Peninsular Railroad connecting Cedar Key to the mainland was completely washed out, leaving boats to transport people, mail, and supplies until the railway was rebuilt in mid-October.

The hurricane destroyed large swaths of red cedar trees (Juniperus virginiana) in the islands and along the adjacent coastline, although that resource had already been in decline due to unsustainable harvesting practices. Cedar wood from the area was prized for making high-quality pencils; some companies produced the pencils locally while others shipped processed cedar to their factories elsewhere. The Eagle Pencil Company mill on Cedar Key was destroyed. Across the channel on Atsena Otie Key, the Eberhard Faber mill lost 3,000 cases of cedar slats, as well as unprocessed timbers, at a loss of around $40,000 (equivalent to $1.5 million in 2025). Several other mills were destroyed. Damage to the Faber facility was repaired following the storm, but it closed just two years later due to a shortage of local cedar wood. Atsena Otie Key was abandoned a few years after the hurricane, largely attributable to the closure of the mill, which provided income for 100 households on the island.

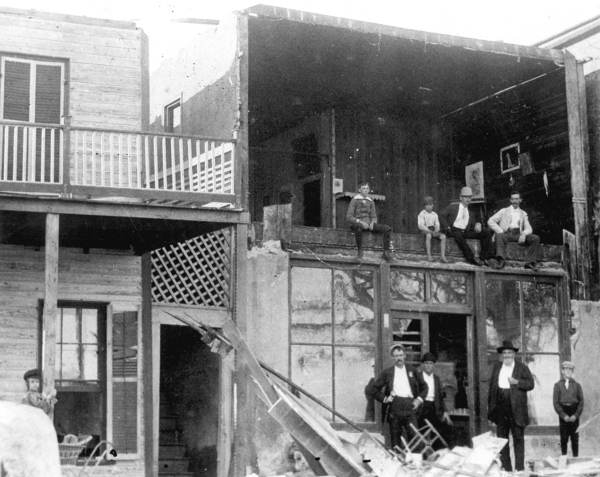
Storm victims pose with damaged houses on Cedar Key

In total, 31 people are known to have been killed by the hurricane in the Cedar Keys, mostly on the exposed outer islands; very few casualties were reported on Cedar Key itself. Immediately after the storm, there were unconfirmed reports that an entire fleet of sponge diving boats sank near the Cedar Keys, leading to the deaths of some 700 men. Only a few bodies of sponge divers were recovered, and modern historians believe that most of the vessels actually rode out the storm in sheltered parts of the island chain. When news of the disaster in the Cedar Keys reached the mainland, many less damaged communities in Florida and Georgia formed relief groups to collect donations for storm victims. Answering pleas to "feed the hungry, clothe the naked, and provide shelter for the homeless," Jacksonville sent thousands of dollars in aid, while Albany residents donated 8,000 lb (3,600 kg) of emergency supplies within days of the storm. Henry Flagler pledged a donation of $1,000 (equivalent to $0.4 million in 2025). By the end of October, the Jacksonville relief committee turned its focus to distributing goods and provisions instead of money, shipping hundreds of barrels of nails—highly sought after for rebuilding efforts—to the hardest-hit areas.

The destruction of timber continued onto the mainland, prompting one observer to remark that no usable trees were left standing between the mouths of the Waccasassa and Suwannee rivers. In Williston, nearly a dozen residences were destroyed, killing at least one person and injuring 15 more. Six prison inmates were killed by a falling tree on a farm near the town, and in total, about 13 people died in mainland Levy County. Damage throughout the county, including the Cedar Keys, was estimated at $450,000 (equivalent to $17.4 million in 2025).

==== Interior ====
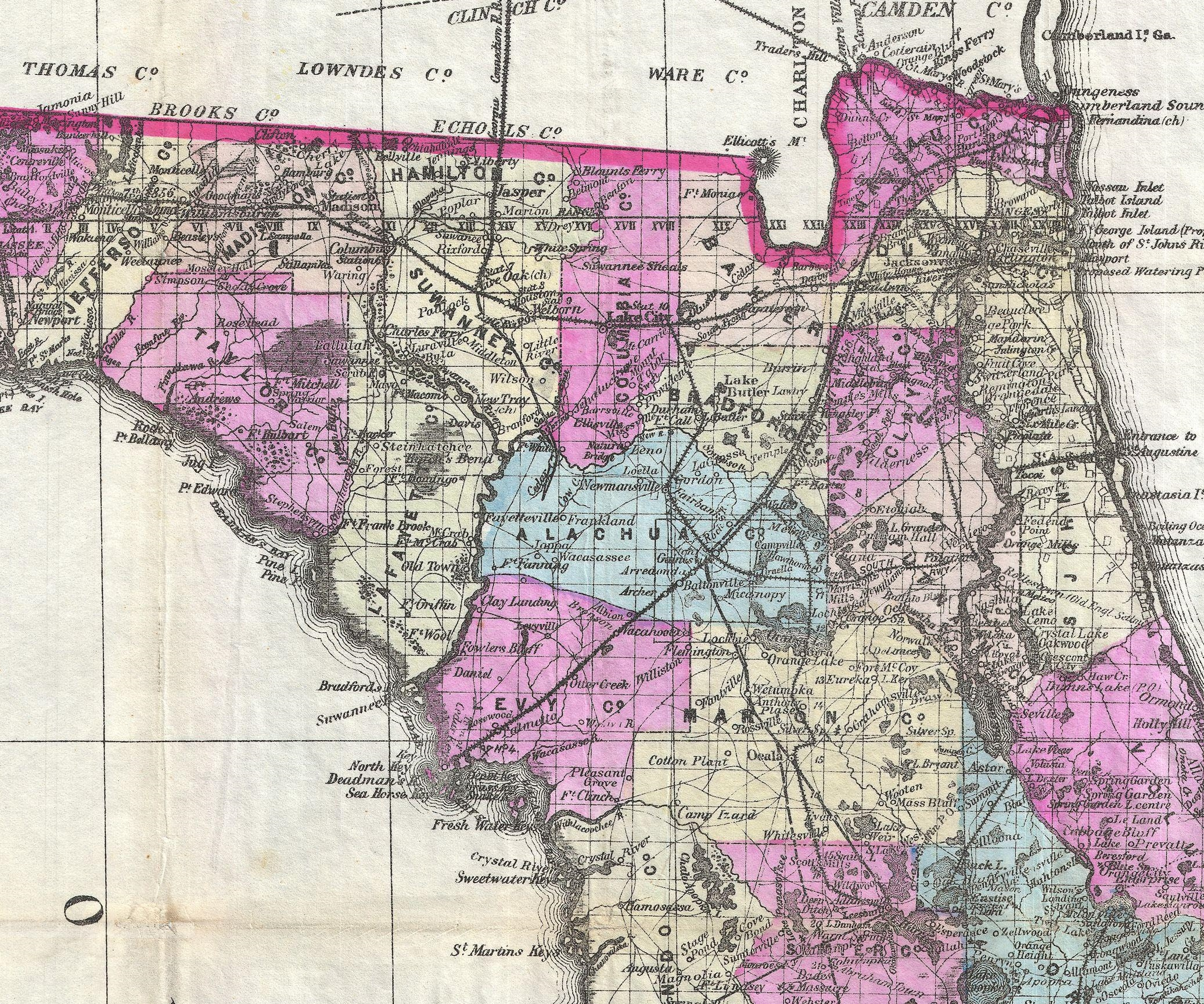
County map of northern Florida drawn in 1884

Along the coast about midway between Tampa and Cedar Key, eight people on a sailboat died when their vessel was driven aground. In Tampa, the storm flooded low-lying areas, wrecked a bridge over Spanishtown Creek, and crumbled sea walls. As the hurricane proceeded inland, it devastated interior parts of the state. Reports from the hardest-hit localities were slow to reach the outside world because of extensive damage to communications infrastructure, as well as obstructed or washed out railroads. Initial reports indicated that at least 20 communities were "wrecked" by the hurricane. In these areas, almost all stores and houses were demolished, particularly in western Alachua and eastern Lafayette counties. Debris was often carried for miles. Farmers lost livestock, crops, and provisions needed for the winter, and hundreds of families were left homeless with little or no food. Along the Suwannee River, storm victims sought refuge in a makeshift shelter constructed from stray timbers. Extreme winds razed entire pine forests across numerous counties, initially uprooting weaker trees before shearing the rest off at their trunks during the height of the storm. By one estimate, the hurricane wiped out 5,000 sq mi (13,000 km^{2}) of timber across the state. This transformed the landscape and gave it a "prairie-like appearance". The turpentine industry was decimated, as the value of the lost pine timber was estimated at $1.5 million (equivalent to $58.1 million in 2025). Additionally, stills used to process turpentine were mangled. Consequently, some 2,500 turpentine workers were left unemployed. Phosphate processing plants east of the Suwanee River also sustained $500,000 in damage (equivalent to $19.4 million in 2025).

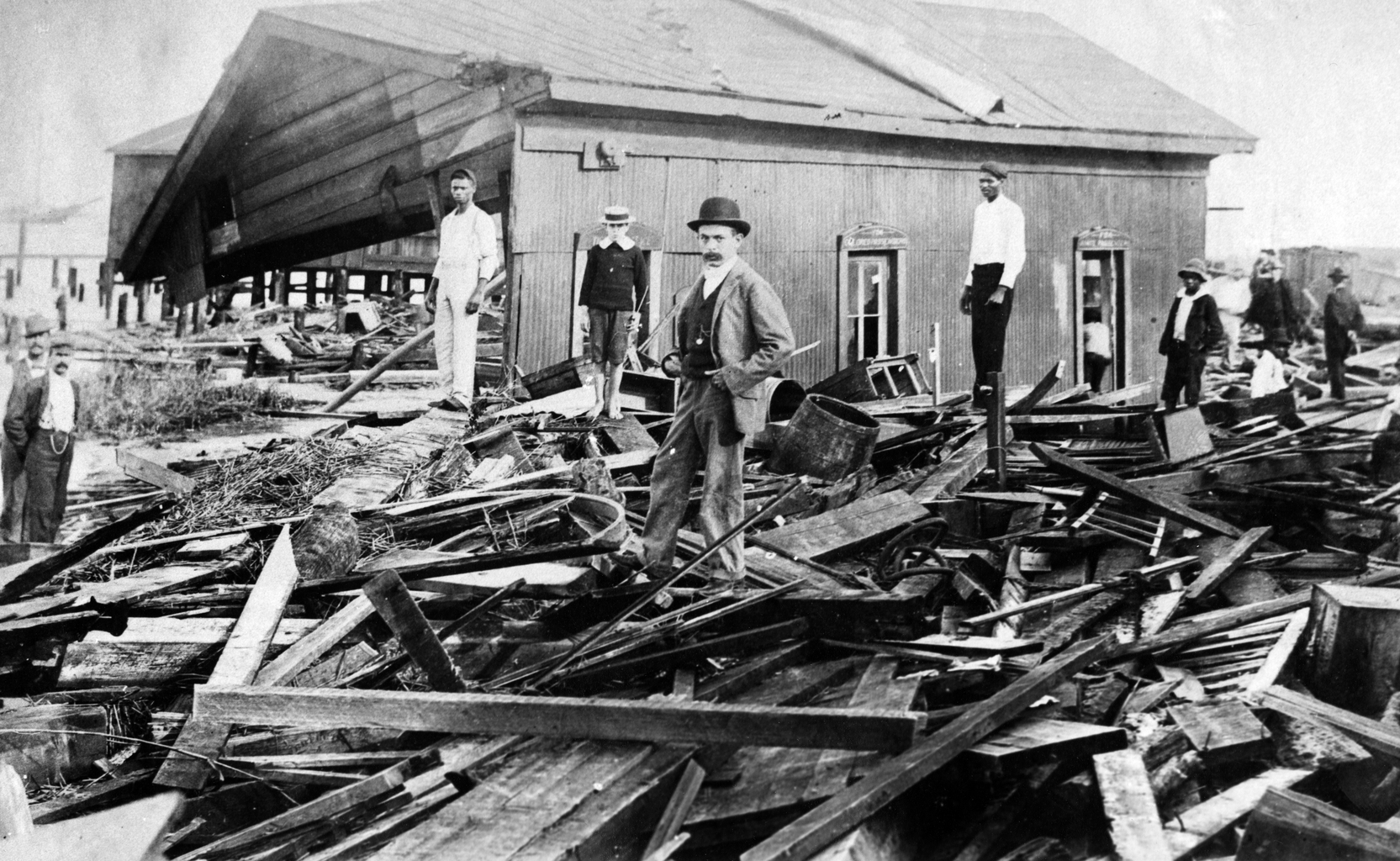
Destruction from the hurricane in Fernandina Beach, Florida

By several days after the hurricane, 12 people were reported dead across Alachua County. Five of them were in High Springs, including two seeking shelter in a box car that was blown off the tracks. Four turpentine workers in LaCrosse were crushed to death when a fallen tree landed on their cabin, and three others in the town were killed. In Newberry, which was "totally wrecked", three people died. About 20 homes and businesses in Gainesville were ravaged, as were a sawmill, church, and warehouse. In Boulogne, Nassau County, five people were killed when a school building collapsed; four were crushed inside, and a baby was fatally struck by airborne timbers from the disintegrating structure. One child escaped the school but later died along with two others when her house collapsed. Another school collapse in Hilliard took the lives of four individuals. Along the St Marys River in Kings Ferry, strong winds drove two ships into a marsh, killing three sailors. Six others died nearby. One sawmill owner donated free lumber to Kings Ferry residents so they could rebuild their homes.

Several communities in Baker County were devastated, leaving seven people dead, as many as 100 injured, and hundreds destitute. The county sheriff estimated that merely a dozen houses out of a thousand survived the storm, that thousands of cows were killed, and that hundreds of thousands of trees were toppled. Not one church or school was left standing in the county, and damage there was estimated at $250,000 (equivalent to $9.7 million in 2025). Eight people were killed in Suwannee County, including two children crushed by the collapse of their home near Wellborn. In Columbia County, dozens of buildings suffered near or total destruction, while nine people were killed. One woman died in Grady, a small settlement in Lafayette County. Additionally, there were five fatalities in Bradford County, including one man reportedly struck by flying bricks that were lofted nearly a half mile downwind. Strong winds and heavy rainfall affected areas as far southeast as St. Augustine. In Fernandina Beach, the hurricane toppled oak trees and destroyed buildings. Although wind gusts in Jacksonville reached 70 mph (110 km/h), the effects were generally insignificant.

=== Georgia ===
The hurricane still had considerable strength when it entered southeastern Georgia. The winds brought down telephone, telegraph, and electric wires throughout the region, severing communications. Damage in the Sea Islands was extensive, costing an estimated $500,000 (equivalent to $19.4 million in 2025); by some accounts, the winds were more intense than in the catastrophic hurricane of 1893, but without the exceptionally high storm surge. The tropical cyclone caused severe damage to the islands' plantations, ruining around a third of the rice crop, devastating the cotton crop, and killing up to 100 people. Charlton and Camden counties bore the brunt of the storm's force in Georgia, as evidenced by the complete clearing of dense pine forests east of Folkston. This dealt a $500,000 (equivalent to $19.4 million in 2025) blow to the turpentine industry. Many structures in Folkston were destroyed, including multiple churches, a courthouse, and a school that collapsed with 38 students inside, all of whom safely escaped. In small communities throughout extreme southeastern Georgia, the storm caused widespread destruction of homes and businesses. Six people in Camden County were killed, including four in a logging settlement that was ravaged near the Florida border.

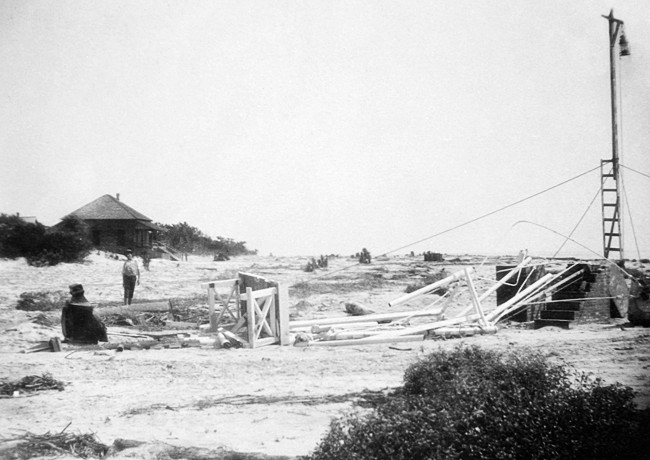
A range light on St. Simons Island toppled by the hurricane

In Brunswick, freight cars in rail yards were badly damaged, and railroads were clogged by fallen trees and utility poles. Estimates of property damage in Brunswick ran as high as $500,000 (equivalent to $19.4 million in 2025), while five people died and many more were injured by flying debris. Hurricane-force wind gusts lifted the roof off the Oglethorpe Hotel and shattered its windows, while the L'Arioso Opera House, regarded as one of Brunswick's "most beautiful buildings", collapsed in the hurricane. At least six churches were severely damaged in the city, along with dozens of stores and residences. The hurricane sank numerous large vessels in the Brunswick harbor, including one loaded with 5,000 lb (2,300 kg) of dynamite, and blew others aground. Observers reported the masts of submerged sailing ships protruding from the surface of the water. On St. Simons Island, the storm destroyed bath houses, cottages, churches, and a pier, and inundated a hotel with sea water. Black settlements on the island suffered extensively. Overall, damage on St. Simons Island totaled $150,000 (equivalent to $5.8 million in 2025). To the north, damage was similarly severe in Darien. Eight people there were reported dead and buildings were "torn to pieces."

Sustained winds in Savannah reached 75 mph (120 km/h), though maximum gusts were not ascertained because the recording anemometer malfunctioned at the height of the storm. The hurricane passed in an unusually brief period of two hours, with most of the damage being done over the course of about 45 minutes. Roofs were "rolled up like tissue-paper" in the fierce winds, while chimneys and brick walls were toppled. In all, thousands of buildings in the city were unroofed, with many of them totally destroyed. Trees were variously uprooted or snapped in parks and cemeteries, including Forsyth Park, considered the "pride of the city", which lost between half and three quarters of its trees. Piles of debris left streets impassable, even to pedestrians. Numerous large ships were driven ashore, though some survived unscathed, and dozens of smaller vessels were wrecked along waterways in the city. Several people, including the captain, drowned when the tugboat Robert Turner capsized in the Savannah River. Another craft, the Island Flower, sank nearby, killing three. The storm surge associated with the hurricane flooded low-lying coastal areas and washed away several miles of the Tybee Railroad. Wind gusts estimated at over 100 mph (160 km/h) demolished hotels and beachfront cottages on Tybee Island. Near Wilmington Island, a fisherman drowned after getting caught in the storm on a small boat.

In Burroughs, along the outskirts of Savannah, two churches were leveled and three people were killed. Residents there were forced to abandon their homes and endure the storm in open fields to avoid injury. Initial estimates placed damage in Savannah at more than $1 million (equivalent to $38.7 million in 2025), a quarter of which resulted from devastation to railroads. In particular, the Savannah, Florida and Western Railway and Central of Georgia Railway sustained extensive losses, and about 50 streetcars in Savannah were destroyed. Overall, the storm killed at least 17 people in and around Savannah. Even before the storm subsided, people crowded the streets in a "stampede" to verify the safety of friends and family.

=== The Carolinas ===
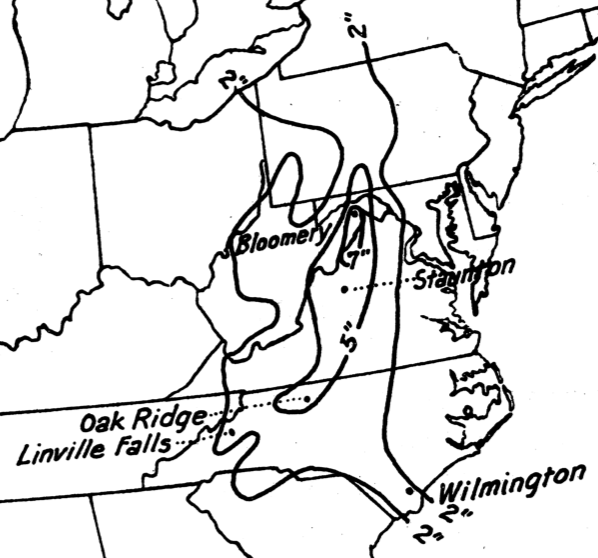
Map of rainfall totals over 2 in (50 mm) from the storm

Southern South Carolina also saw the damaging effects of the storm, which was accompanied by estimated winds of up to 100 mph (160 km/h). On the north side of the Savannah River, mills and outbuildings on rice plantations were destroyed. Powerful gusts shifted a drawbridge spanning the river north of Hardeeville. Seven people in Hardeeville died in building failures, while train stations were blown down there and in Yemassee. Around Beaufort, the storm wrecked numerous boats and effected significant damage to homes and businesses. Wharves and warehouses were flooded, though low astronomical tides limited the extent of the inundation. The winds peeled off tin roofs, allowing rainwater to douse home interiors. In Charleston, tropical storm-force winds blew down fences, signs, and other light installations, but damage was generally minor, and no deaths were reported. The storm churned Charleston Harbor until waves breached seawalls and flooded low-lying areas. Total damage in the state was around $25,000 (equivalent to $0.97 million in 2025).

In North Carolina, the weakening tropical cyclone tracked through predominately rural areas, limiting its adverse effects. Nonetheless, severe winds affected the Raleigh–Durham area, uprooting trees and littering streets with debris. One woman was killed when a large oak tree fell on her bedroom. Damage to utility lines left Raleigh without communications or electricity, while in Durham, a four-story tobacco curing barn collapsed with about 475,000 lb (215,000 kg) of tobacco inside, worth as much as $60,000 (equivalent to $2.32 million in 2025). About $20,000 (equivalent to $0.77 million in 2025) in other property damage was attributed to the storm. Residents in Chapel Hill described the storm as the most severe in recent memory.

=== Virginia and West Virginia ===
As the cyclone expanded and accelerated, it entered Virginia with renewed violence, and produced what still stands as the most severe windstorm in Richmond's history. Generally, the strongest winds were mostly confined to east of the storm center's track. The East End of Richmond was hit particularly hard, but damage to church steeples, roofs, and chimneys was common throughout the whole city. Downed trees and broken branches carpeted the ground and clogged streets. All telegraph lines except one, which ran to Wilmington, North Carolina, were rendered useless, while communications in Petersburg were entirely cut off. Damage in Richmond totaled $150,000 (equivalent to $5.8 million in 2025). Rural areas were also severely impacted; in Boydton, the storm destroyed many barns and stables, crushing the livestock inside them. In farmlands throughout central Virginia, fences, crops, and outbuildings were blown down, stunting agriculture in the region.

"It is said by those who witnessed these scenes that the huge sheets of tin sailed through the air in a manner suggestive of giant vampires. They would be apparently about to alight on one side of a street when they would sail upward again and fall in the opposite direction."

— The Alexandria Gazette and Virginia Advertiser

The destruction continued into northern portions of the state; brick walls were toppled and about 500 shade trees felled in Fredericksburg. Farms in Fairfax and Arlington counties were substantially damaged, and dozens of windmills were destroyed around Falls Church. Wooden houses were blown away. In Alexandria, four people were killed, while factories and homes along the Potomac River were damaged. One of the fatalities occurred when a three-story brick building partially collapsed onto the roof of a smaller house. Across the city, large sheets of tin roofs were peeled off buildings and followed erratic paths before hitting the ground in a clangor that "produced a pandemonium long to be remembered." Property in Alexandria incurred about $400,000 in damage (equivalent to $15.5 million in 2025). Despite the destruction in the city, surveys of the storm's effects revealed that initial reports of its severity were exaggerated. In some cases, damage was enabled or worsened by pre-existing structural flaws. In Manassas, the winds shifted a church 6 in (0.15 m) off its foundation.

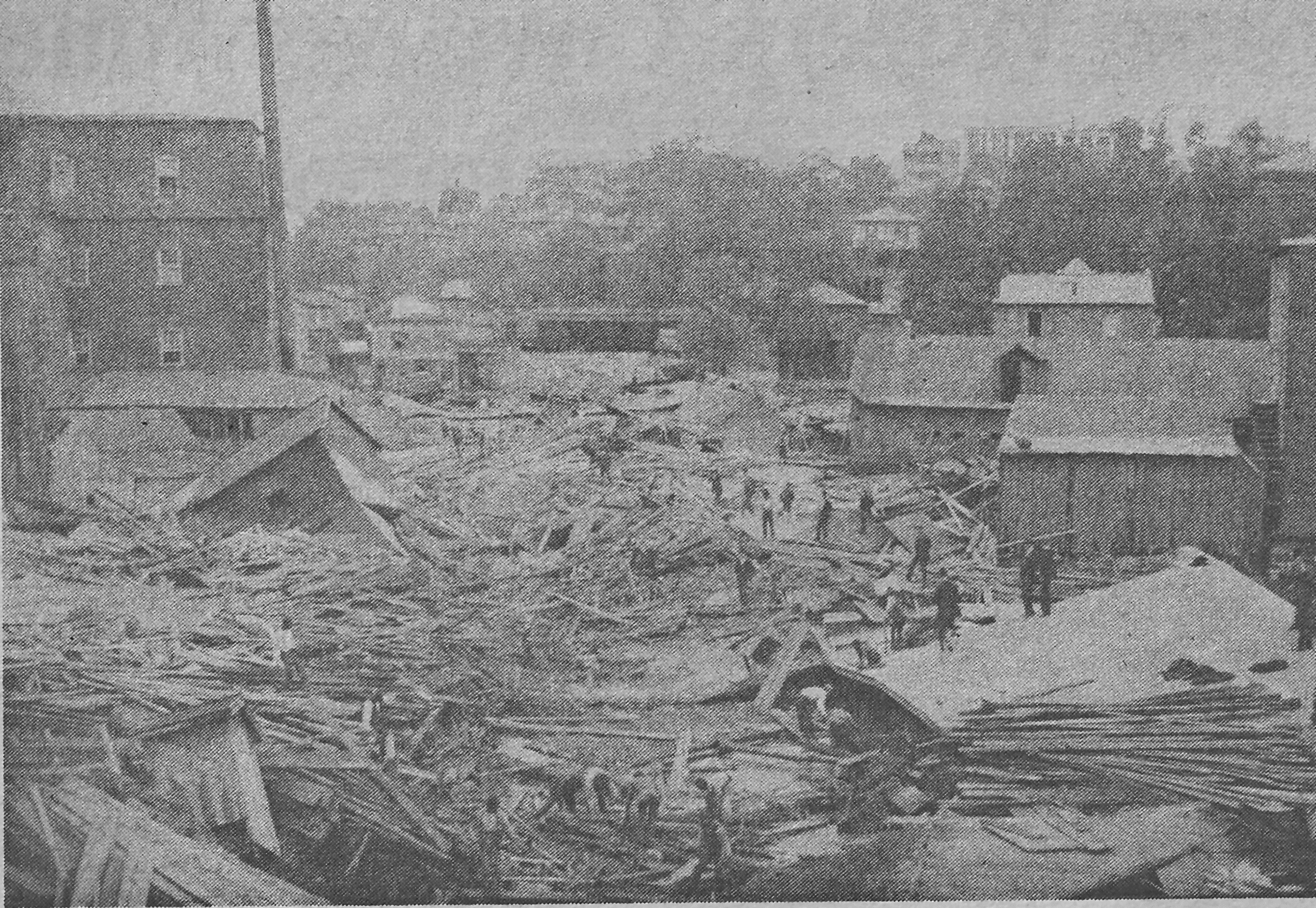
Flash flood destruction in downtown Staunton, Virginia, looking south

Heavy rain fell along and west of the storm's track, most prodigiously in the Shenandoah Valley. Reports of 5 in (130 mm) or more were common; in Dale Enterprise, 6.3 in (160 mm) of rain fell in a period of 18 hours. Nearly 7 in (180 mm) of rain fell over Staunton in a similarly short span of time. The rapid inflow of water caused a lake in Staunton's Gypsy Hill Park to rise until its earthen dam failed around 10 p.m. local time, sending a large volume of water rushing into the town's business district. Along the way, the torrent swept away 25 homes, one of which was occupied by a family of four. Power was cut to the town after floodwaters inundated the electric plant, and multiple hotels, stores, and other businesses were extensively damaged. As waters rose, victims were forced to await rescue from their roofs. A local waterway known as Lewis Creek also overflowed its banks and contributed to the flooding. The Staunton flood took the lives of six people, and inflicted as much as $500,000 (equivalent to $19.4 million in 2025) in property damage. In the countryside, about 40 horses and mules drowned.

Deadly flooding also took place in Rockingham County, affecting the communities of Bridgewater, Elkton, and Keezletown. Three fatalities were reported in the county, and local infrastructure sustained $20,000 in damage (equivalent to $0.77 million in 2025). The South Fork Shenandoah River at Luray swelled to 25.4 ft (7.7 m)—flood stage being 14 ft (4.3 m)—which still stands as one of its highest historical crests. In Stephens City, rushing waters crumbled bridges and washed out corn crops. A waterway in Waynesboro reportedly rose 15 ft (4.6 m) and flowed with enough force to wipe nearby buildings off their foundations. Urban flooding also plagued Roanoke streets. From there to Hagerstown, the Norfolk and Western Railway was severely washed out in multiple places. In total, property damage in Virginia amounted to at least $1 million (equivalent to $38.7 million in 2025). Strong winds and significant rainfall extended into West Virginia, chiefly in northern and eastern parts of the state. Trees, fences, and houses were blown down in the Eastern Panhandle region, while flash floods undermined railroads and destroyed entire fields of crops. Some livestock drowned around Old Fields.

=== Washington, D.C. ===
In Washington, D.C., the storm's approach late on September 29 was marked by nearly continuous cloud to cloud lightning. Five-minute sustained southerly winds reached 66 mph (106 km/h), and peak gusts approached 100 mph (160 km/h); barometric pressure fell to 987 hPa (29.15 inHg). At the time, it was the worst storm to ever affect the city. The winds brought down signs, awnings, trees, and brick walls, while unroofing homes, toppling church steeples, and shattering windows. Electric, telegraph, and telephone utilities were lost. The destruction was not uniform, as poorly built structures often survived unscathed in the vicinity of much stronger buildings that incurred significant damage. It was deduced that the strongest gusts occurred in narrow "streaks". Approximately 5,000 trees were destroyed in the city, many of them being snapped 10 to 15 ft (3.0 to 4.6 m) above the ground. Some of the worst damage occurred in cemeteries, such as the United States Soldiers' and Airmen's Home National Cemetery, where 300 trees were prostrated. In a few cases, the fallen trees unearthed underlying coffins.

A residence building under construction at the Catholic University of America was dismantled, and the personal home of President Grover Cleveland in Woodley Park lost its roof. Roofs of several government offices were also torn away, and the steeple of New York Avenue Presbyterian Church was "reduced to match wood". The Smithsonian Institution Building sustained notable damage. Fallen trees littered the grounds of the White House, among them being historic specimens like an elm planted by Abraham Lincoln. Some of the more celebrated trees were picked apart by passersby trying to procure souvenirs. The White House itself suffered some minor damage, mostly limited to dislodged coping and copper roofing, along with a few broken windows. Nearby, five men were entrapped and one killed when the Abert Building—a newly built, five-story brick structure on Pennsylvania Avenue—partially collapsed in the storm, crushing two adjoining buildings. Over the coming months, tenants filed multiple lawsuits against the building's owner after at least one local builder asserted that the wall failure resulted from neglectful construction. The Abert Building was completely repaired by October 14.

On the Potomac River, where tides ran well above normal, ships broke free from their moorings and drifted downstream. In one instance, a large steamship called the George Leary struck and damaged six other ships. Numerous vessels capsized in the river, including the steamer Mary Washington and the schooner John W. Linnell. At the Washington Navy Yard, multiple buildings sustained damage. Overall losses in Washington, D.C. were approximately $400,000 (equivalent to $15.5 million in 2025), and at least two dozen individuals in the city suffered injuries from falling debris.

=== Maryland ===
Destructive winds continued into central Maryland. A report from Sandy Spring estimated that 20% of trees in the region were uprooted, splintered, or violently twisted, often falling on utility wires and roads. Some of the trees left standing were stripped of their limbs and reduced to bare trunks. Telegraph poles crashed to the ground in large numbers. In some cases, damage patterns and eyewitness accounts suggested the formation of tornadoes embedded within the larger storm system. As in northern Virginia, churches, homes, and businesses incurred significant damage, some being wholly destroyed. Montgomery County was hit particularly hard; the storm wrecked an amusement park in Bethesda, forcing it to permanently close, while Gaithersburg was "most disastrously wrecked". Several individuals died in Montgomery County, including one man who died of a stress-induced heart attack. Most of the farms in central Maryland were affected to some degree. Periods of exceptionally heavy rainfall, amounting to 4.90 in (124 mm) in Flintstone and 3.91 in (99 mm) in Cumberland, caused rapid rises along waterways in the Potomac River watershed, inundating adjacent low-lying areas. The Cumberland and Pennsylvania Railroad line in Cumberland was washed out.

High tides in the Chesapeake Bay flooded streets in Annapolis. Farther north, at Baltimore, water funneled into the Inner Harbor and flooded the city's waterfront. Pratt Street was submerged waist deep, while an overflowing Jones Falls filled bordering streets with 8 ft (2.4 m) of water. Floodwaters drained into cellars and lower levels of warehouses, and forced some families to evacuate their homes. Hundreds of structures in Baltimore were damaged by the windstorm, and several small fires were ignited by downed power lines. Throughout Maryland, the storm took the lives of eight people and wrought $500,000 in damage (equivalent to $19.4 million in 2025).

=== Pennsylvania ===
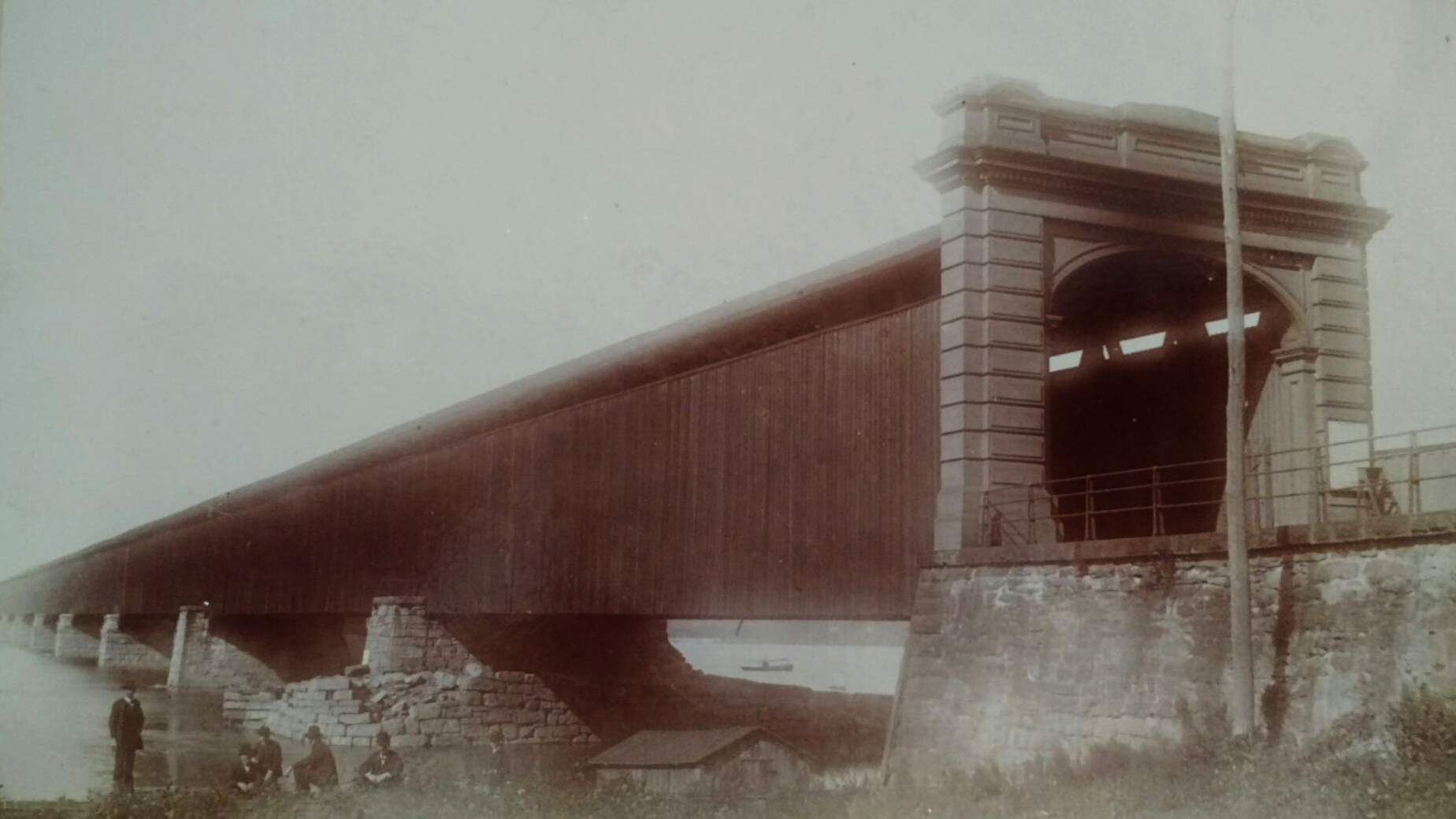
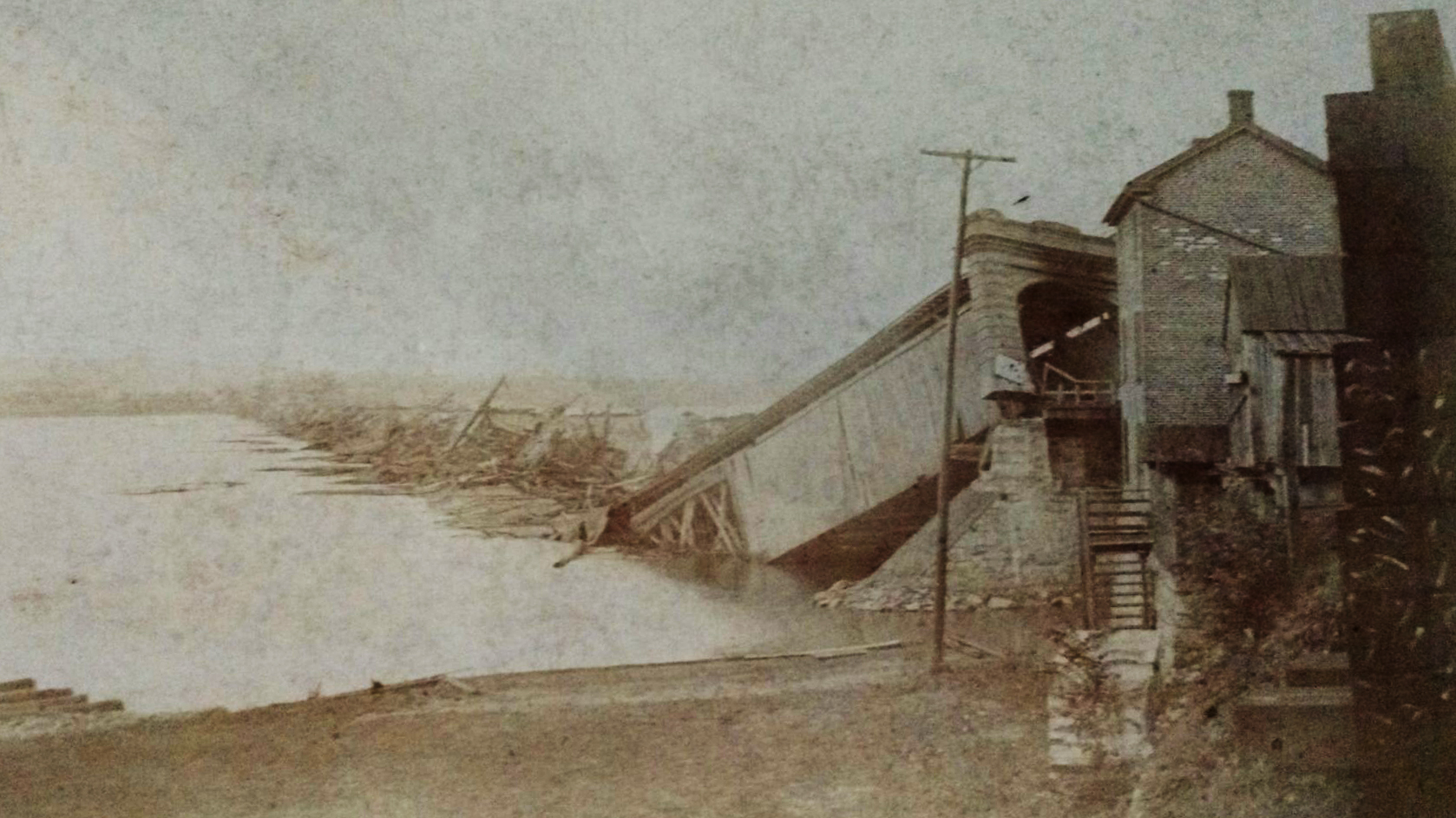
The third incarnation of the Susquehanna River railroad bridge between Columbia and Wrightsville, Pennsylvania, before and after the hurricane on September 29, 1896

The storm arrived in Pennsylvania as an extratropical cyclone late on September 29, still accompanied by strong winds that disconnected wires and interrupted communications throughout the state. Property damage was severe in southeastern parts of the state, especially York and Lancaster counties, where barns were demolished and houses unroofed. Wind gusts in Harrisburg peaked at 72 mph (116 km/h) shortly after midnight. Debris from trees and buildings rained down on the city's streets as the storm produced erratic damage patterns, characterized by distinct two- or three-block gaps in the destruction. Large trees were uprooted "with masses of earth clinging to them as big as a room." In all, damage reached $200,000 (equivalent to $7.7 million in 2025) in Harrisburg. On the Baltimore and Ohio Railroad at Philson, two freight trains violently collided, killing six vagrants. Several more train wrecks were attributed to obstructing storm debris. In Steelton, an overpass collapsed onto the tracks of the Pennsylvania Railroad shortly before a train careened through the rubble, damaging the locomotive and several cars. Additionally, two roundhouses were destroyed in Lebanon, with eight locomotives sustaining damage in one of the structures.

The third incarnation of the Columbia–Wrightsville Bridge—a 5,390 ft (1,640 m) covered railroad bridge across the Susquehanna River—was shoved off its piers and demolished by the intense winds. Several people were reportedly inside the bridge when it collapsed, but this was not confirmed. The stone, wood, and steel span was replaced by a steel truss bridge less than a year later. At Sunbury, two steamboats sank in the Susquehanna. Across Lancaster County, hundreds of farmers lost their entire tobacco crops that were stored in barns and ready for market. Some of the tobacco barns were carried off their foundations and blown afield. The storm also destroyed more substantial brick structures. Damage in the county was estimated at $1 million (equivalent to $38.7 million in 2025).

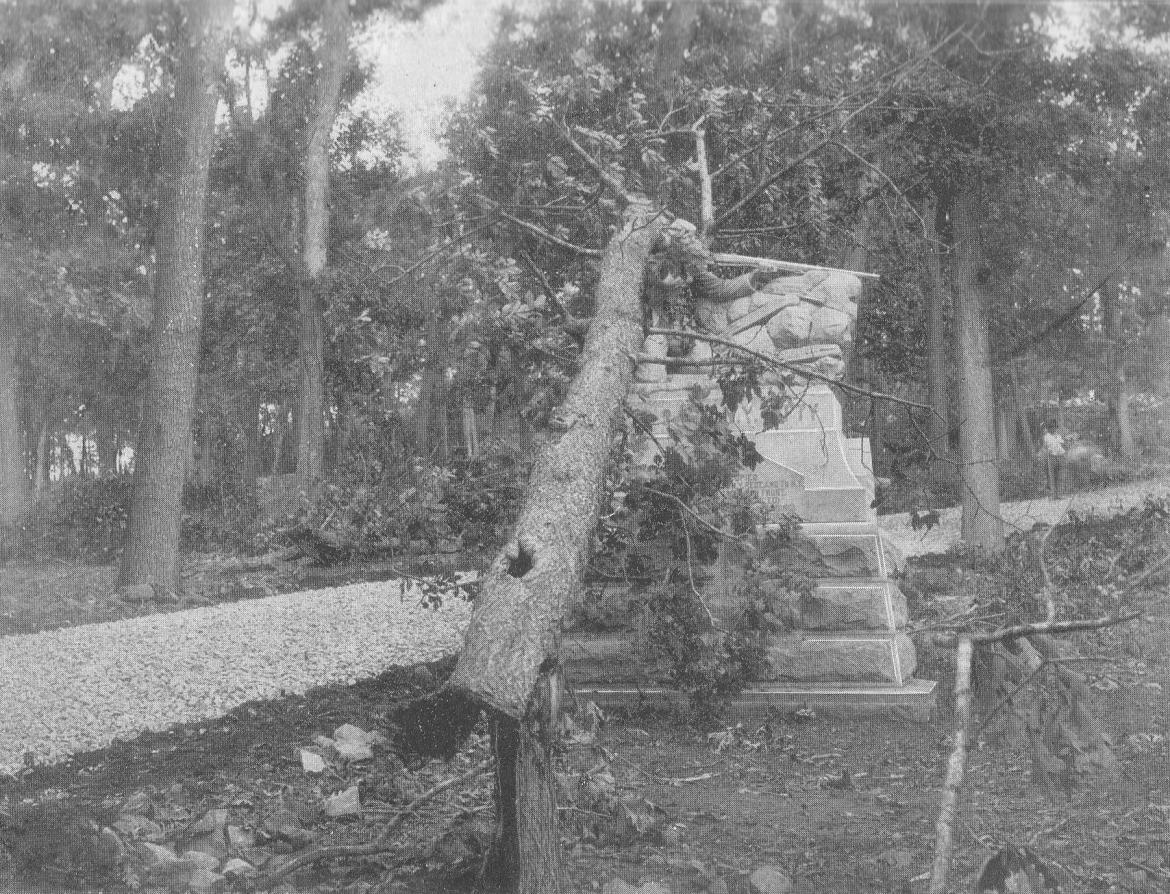
The 78th and 102nd New York Volunteer Infantry Regiments monument damaged by a fallen tree on the Gettysburg Battlefield

Two men died in the Patterson Coal Company miners' village in Shamokin that was devastated by the winds and a subsequent fire that together destroyed dozens of houses and shanties. The storm destroyed equipment and facilities at the nearby Colbert Colliery, putting hundreds of miners out of work. In Reading, two men died in the collapse of an iron furnace casting house which left five others badly injured. Six children died to a storm-induced fire in tenement housing belonging to a mining company in Natalie. Hundreds of trees were blown down or broken on the historic battlefield at Gettysburg National Park, largely on Culp's Hill and Big Round Top. The 66th Ohio Infantry monument on Culp's Hill was destroyed by a fallen tree, and the nearby monument to the 78th and 102nd New York Volunteer Infantries sustained minor damage. In addition to the winds, several inches of rain fell in parts of the state; Altoona recorded 3.79 in (96 mm) of precipitation. Flash flooding along the Juniata River rushed through Huntingdon, washing out streets and railways, inundating homes, and drowning livestock. Washouts and landslides plagued railroads throughout western Pennsylvania. Overall, the storm caused over $2 million (equivalent to $77.4 million in 2025) in damage in the state.

=== Great Lakes region ===
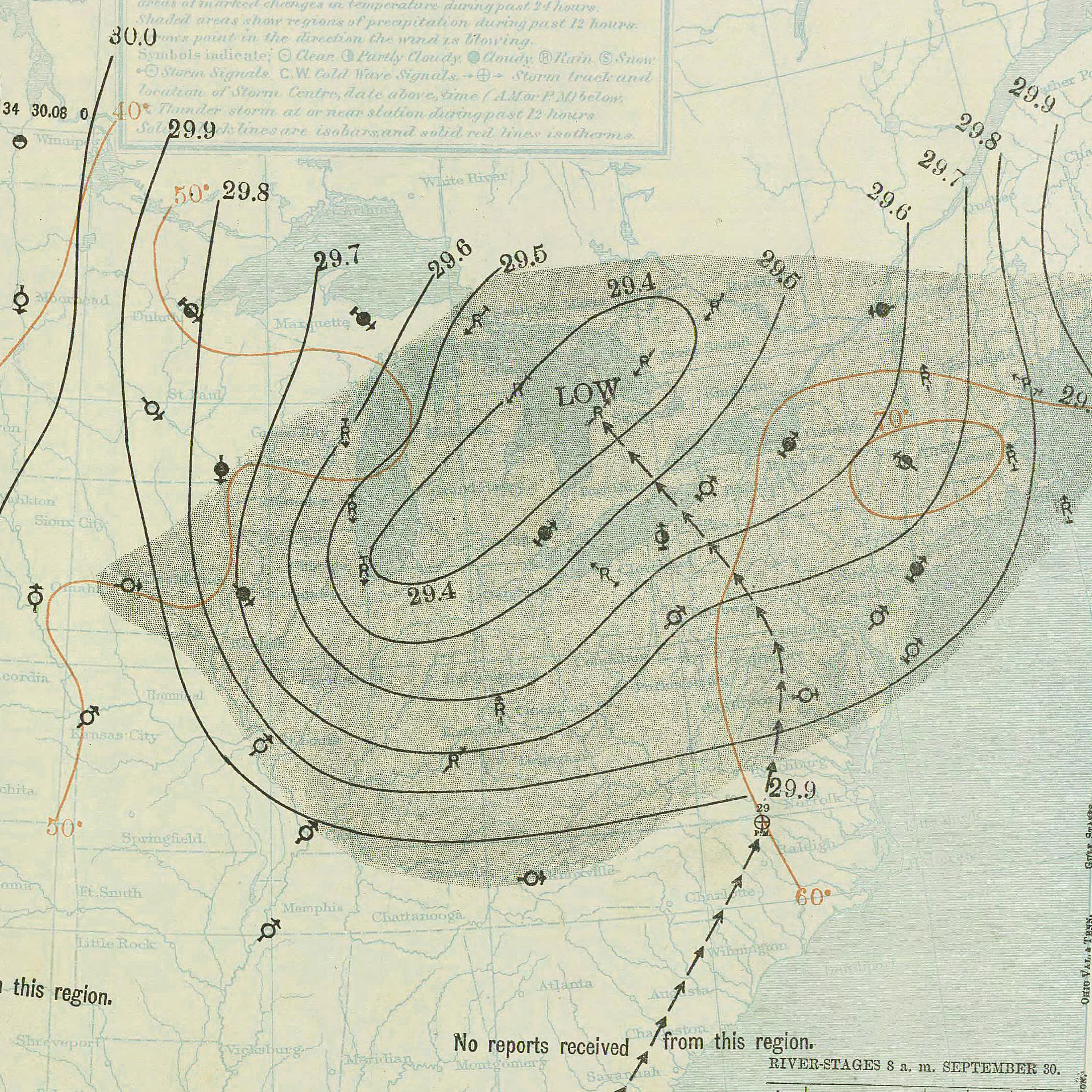
Map of the hurricane's extratropical remnants over the Great Lakes on September 30

Strong winds associated with the extratropical cyclone impacted parts of central and western New York State, particularly around Syracuse; there, it was considered the worst storm in recent memory. Homes, barns, and factories lost their roofs in several towns, with some buildings near Ithaca being totally destroyed. Trees and communications lines suffered a similar fate as in many other areas along the storm's path. Trees in orchards were stripped of nearly all their fruit. Buffalo endured 53 mph (85 km/h) winds that tore wires and damaged roofs. Farther east, wind gusts exceeded 60 mph (100 km/h) at New York City, bringing down overhead wires. A switchboard at a telephone exchange in Brooklyn sparked a fire that caused $30,000 (equivalent to $1.2 million in 2025) in damage. Several steamships limped into port at New York with significant damage. From New Jersey to Long Island, trees, fences, chimneys, windows, and political campaign signs fell victim to the storm. On the Hudson River at Newburgh, in the early morning hours on September 30, a tugboat collided with a passenger vessel, injuring two crew members of the former craft. "Considerable" wind damage extended north through the Hudson Valley, and trains along the West Shore Railroad were delayed by landslides and washouts. Total property damage in New York was assessed at $50,000 (equivalent to $1.9 million in 2025).

Heavy rainfall doused parts of Ohio for four days beginning on September 27. Resulting floods damaged crops and property, and the inclement weather disrupted William McKinley's presidential campaign activities at his home in Canton.

On September 30, gales from the former hurricane swept across the Great Lakes. Hundreds of spectators lined the shores of Lake Michigan at Chicago, Illinois, to watch the enormous waves. A schooner was torn from its moorings at Chicago, and crashed into nearly a dozen smaller vessels while being blown about. The schooner Belle from Racine, Wisconsin, went missing amid the storm, while the barge Sumatra broke up and capsized near Milwaukee, taking the lives of four crew members; the captain, first mate, and cook were safely rescued. The storm damaged around $75,000 worth of property on the Great Lakes (equivalent to $2.9 million in 2025).

== See also ==
- List of United States hurricanes by area:
  - Florida
  - North Carolina
  - Delaware
  - Pennsylvania
  - New York
- Tropical cyclone rainfall climatology
- Hurricane Idalia (2023) – made landfall as a Category 3 hurricane along the Big Bend Coast
- Hurricane Helene (2024) – the strongest hurricane on record to make landfall in Florida's Big Bend region
