= Daniel Gugel Purse Sr. =

American businessman (1839–1908)

Daniel Gugel Purse
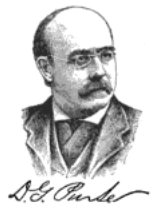
- Purse around 1890
- Born: November 14, 1839; Savannah, Georgia, U.S.
- Died: August 6, 1908 (aged 68); Savannah, Georgia, U.S.
- Occupation: Businessman

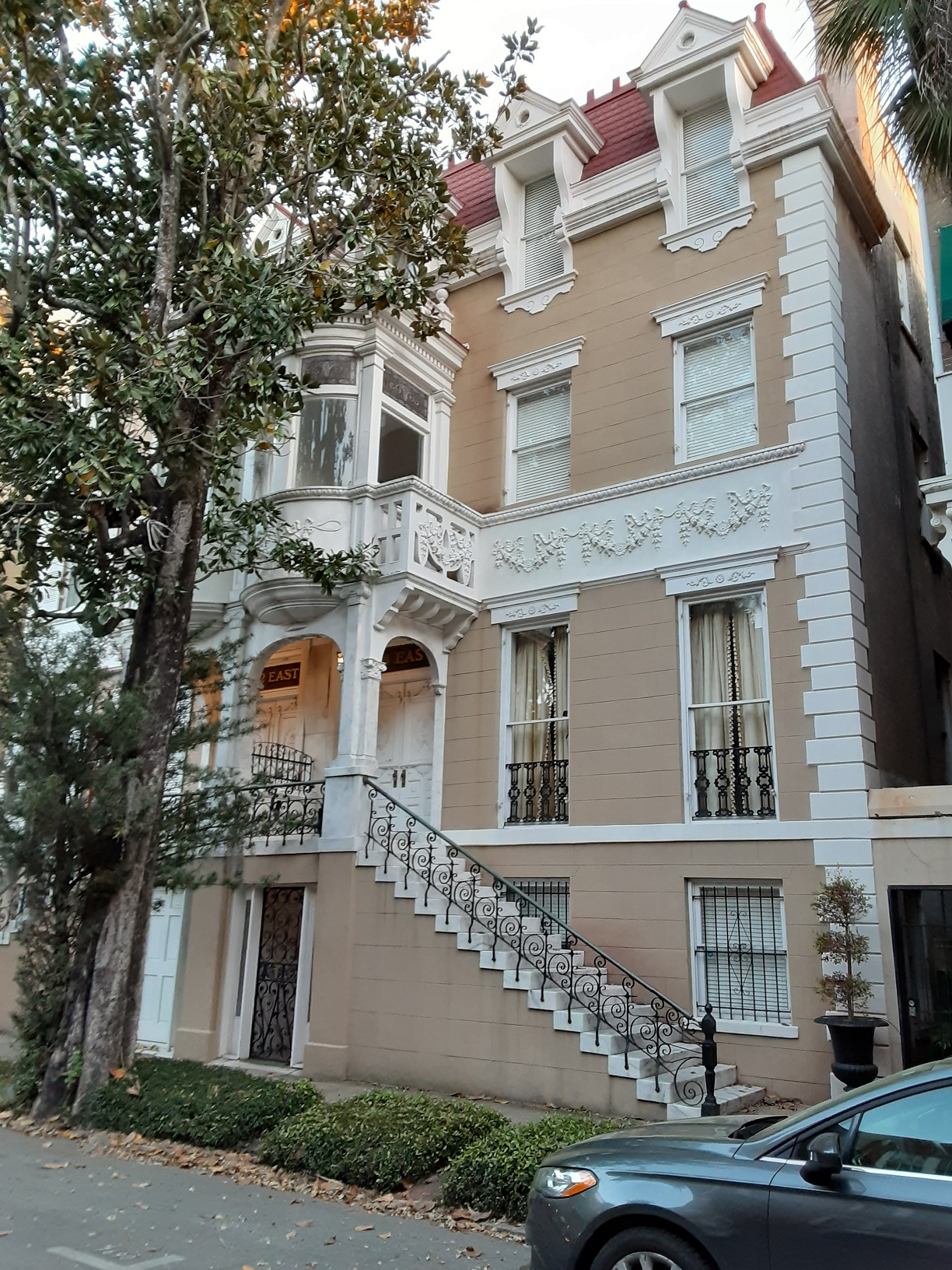
14 East Taylor Street in Savannah's Monterey Square

Daniel Gugel Purse Sr. (November 14, 1839 – August 6, 1908) was an American army captain and businessman from Savannah, Georgia. After serving with the First Georgia Volunteers during the Civil War, he became president of the Savannah Board of Trade.

== Life and career ==
Purse was born in 1839 in Savannah, Georgia, to Thomas Pilkington Purse, a Virginia native, and Eliza Jane Gugel, of Savannah.

He graduated academically from Oxford College of Emory University in Atlanta and commercially from Duff's Business Institute in Pittsburgh, Pennsylvania. He "taught school, read law a short time," before beginning a commercial life in Savannah.

Purse's most noted achievements are the development of Tybee Island, from largely a desert into a popular summer resort, and the construction of the Tybee Railroad over large sections of salt marsh. He was also extensively engaged in rice planting.

In 1865, Purse married Laura Ashby, with whom he had seven known children. They were: Marshall Ashby (born 1867; became a noted doctor in Atlanta), Daniel Gugel Jr. (1869), Thomas (1874), Henry (1878), Charles (1880) and Clayton (1882). The seventh died in infancy in 1885. Henry died of pneumonia in his second year as a cadet in the United States Naval Academy.

After the Civil War, in 1866, he went into business with Daniel Remshart Thomas (1843–1915), a fellow Savannahian. Three years later, the two men built a duplex on Taylor Street in Savannah, now known as the Thomas-Purse Duplex, in Monterey Square. The western half is now known as the Thomas-Levy House, with Purse owning number 14 next door.

He was a prominent member of Savannah's St. John's Episcopal Church, and was a Freemason.

== Death ==
Purse committed suicide in 1908, in the lavatory adjoining his office in the Board of Trade building. He was 68. His son, Daniel Jr., had stepped out to check that the clock on Savannah City Hall matched that of his father's. Upon returning to the building, he was met by James L. Rankin, who had an office on the third floor. Rankin asked if Purse Sr. was in his office, and after his son replied in the affirmative, they heard a shot ring out. Upon their reaching the antechamber, Purse Sr. was facing them in a seated position, with his head resting against the rear wall of the room. His right temple showed a pistol-shot wound. The weapon, a .38 calibre revolver, lay on the floor beside him. Doctor Herman William Hesse was sent for, and Purse was still living but unconscious at the time of his arrival, but he died shortly thereafter.

Purse had been in ill-health for some time, and was under medical treatment. The Panic of 1907 "seemed to weigh upon him and members of his family had noticed that he was not in good spirits."

He is buried in Savannah's Laurel Grove Cemetery with his wife, who survived him by seven years, and all but one of his children (Marshall is interred in St. Simons, Georgia). Daniel Jr. survived his father by four years. He died from cirrhosis of the liver and kidney, aged 43.
