= Thomas–Levy House =

Historic house in Savannah, Georgia, United States

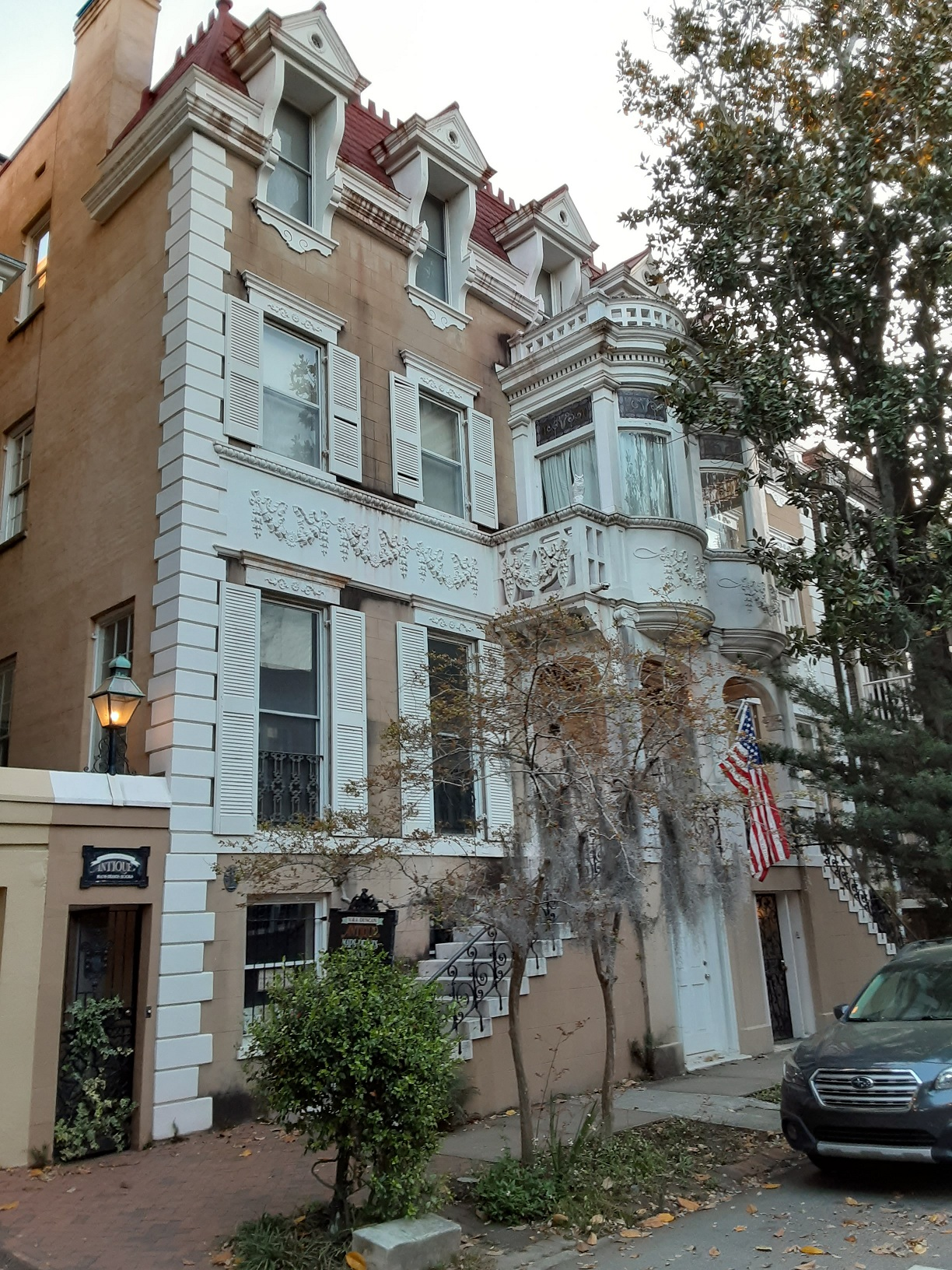
- The building in 2022
- Interactive map of the Thomas–Levy House area

General information
- Location: Savannah, Georgia, U.S., 12 East Taylor Street
- Coordinates: 32.071676°N 81.09408°W
- Completed: 1869 (157 years ago)
- Owner: John Duncan; Ginger Duncan

Technical details
- Floor count: 4

The Thomas–Levy House is a historic building in Savannah, Georgia, United States. It comprises the western half of a Second Empire baroque townhouse known as the Thomas–Purse Duplex, located in the northeastern residential block of Monterey Square. It was built in 1869 for Daniel Remshart Thomas, and is part of the Savannah Historic District. Meanwhile, Savannah's Historic Preservation Commission's definition of “exceptional importance” refers to structures built outside of 1870–1923.

In a survey for Historic Savannah Foundation, Mary Lane Morrison found the building to be of significant status.

== History ==
Daniel Remshart Thomas (1843–1915) was a Savannah native. After the Civil War, he went into business with Captain Daniel Gugel Purse Sr. Three years later, the two men built a duplex, of which one half is now known as the Thomas–Levy House, with Purse owning number 14 next door. Thomas lived at number 12 with his wife Jeanne Manget. His family later moved to another duplex, the Abraham Smith & Herman Traub building at 210 East Gaston Street, where Thomas died in 1916.

The Levy family purchased the property in the 1880s, and it was renovated and added to in 1897 by department-store owner Benjamin Hirsch Levy I, a native of Alsace, France. Marion Levy Mendal died in 2019 at the age of 101. She was married to Benjamin Hirsch Levy II, grandson of the earlier owner.

The building's basement level is the home of V & J Duncan Antique Maps, Prints and Books, established in 1983 by John and Virginia (Ginger) Duncan. They purchased the property in 1977 for $36,000. They installed an elevator in 2008. John Berendt, author of Midnight in the Garden of Good and Evil, visited the Duncans in the early 1980s, during the early research for his non-fiction novel. Ginger is mentioned in the book, while both John and Ginger appear in Clint Eastwood's 1997 film adaptation.

Its courtyard features a reproduction of Antonio Canova's Psyche Revived by Cupid's Kiss sculpture that was on exhibition at the 1915 Panama–Pacific International Exposition in San Francisco.

== See also ==
- Buildings in Savannah Historic District
