= David W. Drake =

American musician

- Born: November 23, 1834; Stephens City, Virginia
- Died: October 25, 1909 (aged 74); Staunton, Virginia
- Spouse: Kate M. Slaughter
- Military career
- Allegiance: Confederate States of America
- Branch: Confederate States Army
- Service years: 1861-1862
- Rank: Chief Musician, Sergeant major
- Units: Company Band, 5th Virginia Infantry; Company L, 5th Virginia Infantry; Company E, 1st Virginia Infantry
- Conflicts: American Civil War

David William Drake (November 23, 1834 – October 25, 1909) was a farmer, musician and the founder of the Stonewall Brigade Band. He began the band with Edwin Cushing, and recruited A. J. Turner as the band's first director. Drake moved to Staunton, Virginia in 1854. He married Kate Murat Slaughter, of Rappahannock County, on April 15, 1868. The band became part of the 5th Virginia Infantry Regiment. He played a bugle, and was in the West Augusta Guard (Company L) before the band, and later in the 1st Virginia Cavalry. Jeb Stuart commended his volunteering to perform hazardous scouting duties across the Rappahannock River.
