= Edwin Cushing =

American musician, auctioneer and coroner

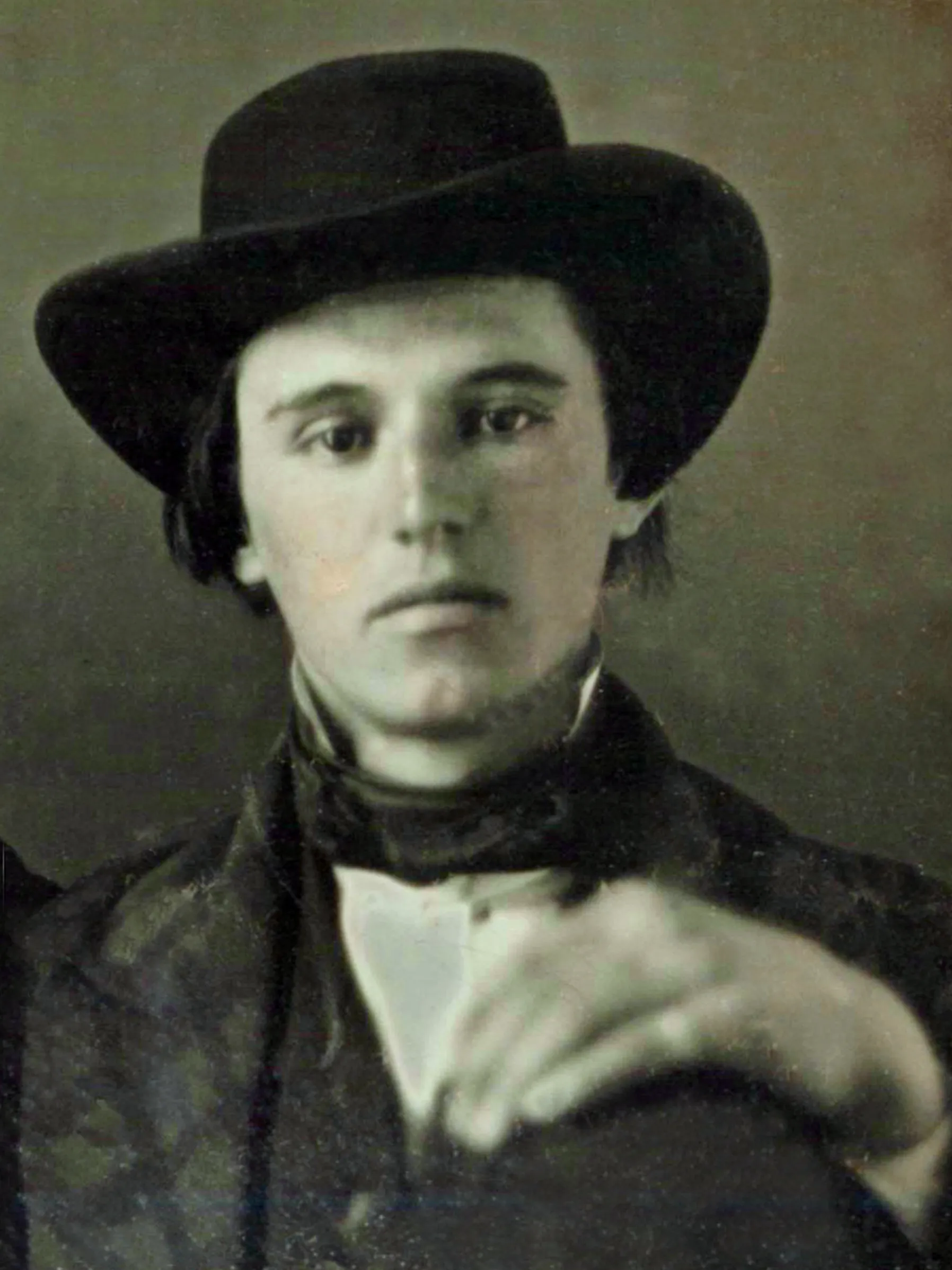
- Daguerreotype of Edwin Cushing at age 20, circa 1850
- Born: September 7, 1830; Staunton, Virginia, United States
- Died: December 7, 1903 (aged 73); Staunton, Virginia

Edwin Merrill "Ned" Cushing (September 7, 1830 – December 7, 1903) was an American tenor horn player, auctioneer, and coroner in Staunton, Virginia. Cushing was a charter member and first president of the Stonewall Brigade Band. He was considered a "veritable encyclopedia" of Staunton's town history. He was a town alderman in 1853, 1854, and 1856. His gavel is still kept.

== Early years ==
Cushing was born on September 7, 1830, to Merrill Cushing and Anne Barnes. He married Betty McCoy, daughter of Judson McCoy.

== Stonewall Brigade Band ==
David W. Drake and Cushing helped found the Stonewall Brigade Band, recruiting A. J. Turner as its first director.

== Civil War ==
Before the war, Cushing was sergeant major of the One Hundred and Sixtieth Regiment, Virginia. He enlisted at the start of war in the quartermaster department. He was released and took part in iron-making in 1863. He later resumed his position as quartermaster. He reportedly served as a "most efficient member" of the Confederate commissary department and, at one point, was appointed as an overseer of the poor. The band was in the 5th Virginia Infantry Regiment.

== Death ==
Cushing died of acute pneumonia on December 7, 1903. He is buried in Thornrose Cemetery.
