= Marshall Ashby Purse =

American physician (1867–1938)

- Born: 1867; Savannah, Georgia, U.S.
- Died: 1938 (aged 70–71)
- Resting place: Christ Church Episcopal Cemetery, St. Simons, Georgia, U.S.
- Occupation: Physician
- Spouse: Josephine

Marshall Ashby Purse (1867–1938) was an American physician. He was eminent in Atlanta, Georgia.

== Life and career ==
Purse was born in 1867 in Savannah, Georgia, to Daniel Gugel Purse Sr. and Laura Ashby, one of their seven children.

He graduated from Emory University in Atlanta in 1890 and from Columbia College in New York in 1892.

He married Josephine Earnest.

In 1896, he succeeded Dr. Harris as professor of chemistry at Southern Medical College in Atlanta.

=== Death ===
Purse died in 1938, aged 70 or 71. He is interred in Christ Church Episcopal Cemetery, St. Simons, Georgia.
