= Stonewall Brigade Band =

- Origin: Staunton, Virginia, United States
- Genres: Brass band Marching band Concert Band
- Years active: 1855–present
- Past members: A. J. Turner, T. M. Turner

The Stonewall Brigade Band is a community concert band based in Staunton, Virginia. It is the United States's oldest continuous community band sponsored by local government and funded, in part, by tax monies. Originally a brass band, the band was formed in 1855 as the Mountain Sax Horn Band. It was also called Turner's Silver Cornet Band by 1859, for its first director, A. J. Turner. At the onset of the American Civil War, the band was mustered into the 5th Virginia Infantry Regiment, part of the Stonewall Brigade under Stonewall Jackson.

== Antebellum history ==
Alto saxhorn used in the band's antebellum performances.

In Staunton, Virginia in 1855 one David W. Drake wished to start a band. He enlisted the help of Edwin Cushing and prevailed upon A. J. Turner, his former music teacher in Newtown, to move to Staunton. These three and other white, male citizens of the city formed the Mountain Saxhorn Band. The band's first formal concert occurred on July 17, 1857 at Union Hall on Beverley Street in Staunton.

During the 1850s, the band began a tradition of playing for civic occasions, including political rallies held for Presidents Millard Fillmore and Franklin Pierce and candidates Stephen A. Douglas and John C. Breckinridge.

On April 4, 1861, Turner's Silver Cornet Band, together with the Staunton Musical Association and the Glee Club, presented at Armory Hall the last concert that was to be given before the Civil War.

== Civil War ==
The band was mustered into the Fifth Virginia Regiment. As well as entertaining the troops in the field, the band frequently appeared in concerts in Fredericksburg, Richmond, Staunton, and elsewhere to help recruiting rallies, clothing drives, and war relief fund raising. In addition to playing their instruments, the band members fought and acted as couriers and letter bearers. The band was also soon organized into a surgeon corps, serving as stretcher-bearers and surgeons' assistants.

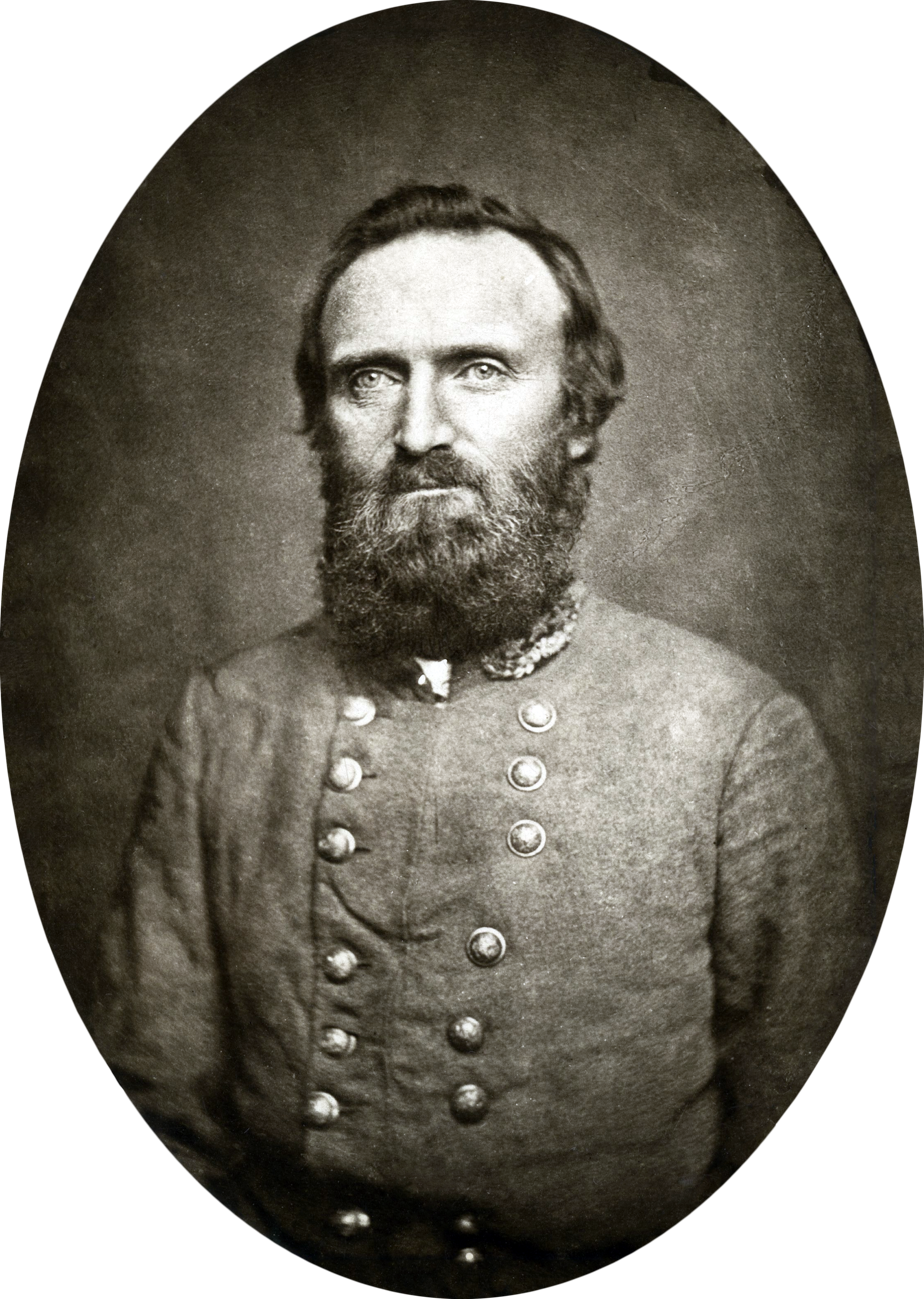
The band was in Stonewall Jackson's (pictured) brigade

The band earned the name Stonewall Brigade Band soon after First Manassas, and has been known as such ever since. (Note: The same battle which gave Stonewall Jackson his nickname.) On August 22, 1861, Stonewall Jackson wrote to his wife "I wish my darling could be with me now and enjoy the sweet music of the brass band of the Fifth Regiment. It is an excellent band." Jackson was fond of music, but had no talent for it, and confessed he could not recognize one song from another.

The band served throughout the Valley Campaign and the Seven Days Battles.

== Post war reorganization ==
The band was reorganized in 1869 with A. J. serving as leader. His son T. M. Turner served as assistant leader. By 1875 the band was formally known as the Stonewall Brigade Band and incorporated under the laws of Virginia.

On April Fool's Day 1878, the band was sent a letter that the Governor had appointed them to play in Paris.

=== Grant and the Band ===
The band's instruments from the time of the Civil War are still exhibited in their band room. They were apparently allowed to keep them as they were considered personal possessions, but several legends grew that Ulysses S. Grant allowed the band to keep their instruments through some special order.

Perhaps due to the legend, the band grew a certain fondness for Grant, and on June 30, 1874, the band greeted Grant in Staunton with several songs. Upon being asked, Mayor Trout identified the band as the Stonewall Brigade Band. Grant responded with a murmur: "The Immortal Jackson". The Band also played at Grant's funeral in 1885.

=== Stonewall's Daughter's Marriage ===
Also in 1885, the band presented the daughter of Stonewall Jackson a wedding gift of a souvenir band roster printed on white satin.

=== Gypsy Hill Park ===
The band has a bandstand in Gypsy Hill Park. The band performed in Gypsy Hill Park for Arbor Day, 1889.

=== 1893 World's Fair ===
The band and its war-time instruments were exhibited at the 1893 World's Fair in Chicago.

== Members ==
=== Original members ===
The earliest records list fourteen original members:

- J. W. Alby
- Samuel C. Baskins
- Edwin M. Cushing
- Alexander A. Grove
- David E. Strasburg
- James A. Armentrout
- James Harvey Burdett
- Augustus Dalias
- John Blair Hoge
- Augustus J. Turner
- Joseph P. Ast
- William A. Burnett
- David W. Drake
- Horace M. Stoddard

=== Original war-time members ===
These men made up the original, officially authorized Fifth Regiment Band:

- James A. Armentrout
- Hugh Barr
- John M. Carroll
- Horace M. Stoddard
- T. Memory Turner
- Joseph P. Ast
- Samuel Baskins
- Alexander Grove
- David Strasburg
- Charles E. Wood
- Price T. Barnitz
- James Harvey Burdett
- Charles E. Haines
- A. J. Turner

=== List of directors ===
Directors of the Stonewall Brigade Band include:

- A. J. Turner (1855–1884)
- F. R. Webb (1884–1892)
- Francisco Touchon (1892–1892)
- Thomas Prosho (1892–1893)
- J. M. Brereton (1893–1904)
- Thomas H. Beardsworth (1904–1922)
- Martin G. Manch
- Arthur Johnson (1922–1925)
- Roy W. Wonson
- William H. Ruebush
- Josef Studeny (1940–1948)
- John P. Swiecki (1948–1958)
- Paul B. Sanger (1958–1966)
- Raymond Borrell (1966–1975)
- Robert N. Moody (1975–2018)
- Kevin Haynes (2018–2026)
