= Daniel Remshart Thomas =

American businessman (1843–1916)

- Born: August 27, 1843; Savannah, Georgia, U.S.
- Died: April 7, 1915 (aged 71); Savannah, Georgia, U.S.
- Resting place: Laurel Grove Cemetery
- Occupation(s): Businessman; City councillor

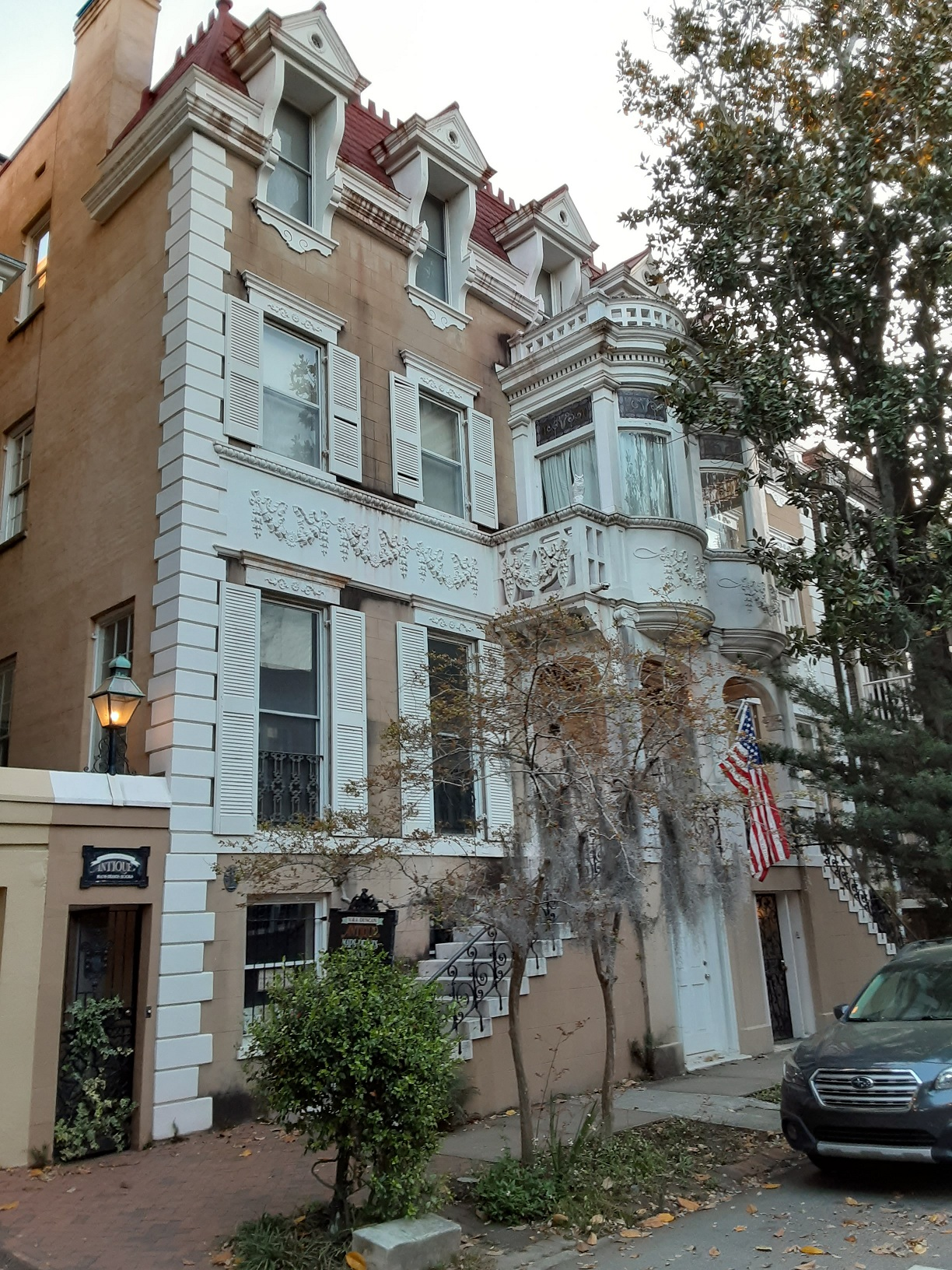
Savannah's Thomas-Levy House, in Monterey Square, in 2022

Daniel Remshart Thomas (August 27, 1843 – April 7, 1915) was an American businessman and city councillor based in Savannah, Georgia. He was an original member of the Sinking Fund Commission, which was established by the City of Savannah in 1878 aimed at retiring general bond issues. He served on the city council for almost fourteen years.

== Life and career ==
Thomas was born in 1843, to John T. Thomas and Jane Ann Remshart. As a child, he had "a delicate constitution and imperfect sight".

In 1862, during the Civil War, he enlisted in Company G (Tattnall Guards), First Volunteer Regiment of Georgia. Due to ill-health, he was assigned to district headquarters and the war tax office. He performed his duties there "with such exactness and efficiency" that he was given the highest commendation.

After the war, he relocated to Macon, Georgia, where he worked as an insurance agent. He returned to his hometown in 1866, and went into the commission, fertilizer and coal business with Captain Daniel Gugel Purse Sr. Three years later, the two men built a duplex, now known as the Thomas-Purse Duplex, of which the western half is now known as the Thomas-Levy House, with Purse owning number 14 next door. Thomas lived at number 12 with his wife. His family later moved to another duplex, the Abraham Smith & Herman Traub building at 210 East Gaston Street. The firm of Purse & Thomas was dissolved in December 1878, and Thomas continued in the coal trade.

He married Jeanne Marie Estelle Manget in 1867. They had two children.

His sight having become very impaired, Thomas sought the help of an oculist and an optician, who together provided him with sufficient relief and greatly changed his life.

In 1878, he became an original member of the Sinking Fund Commission, which was established by the City of Savannah. He served as its secretary until January 1883, when he resigned and became an alderman. He was in that role, on the city council, for six years, at which point he returned to his role as secretary of the Sinking Fund Commission.

Thomas made an unsuccessful bid to become mayor of Savannah in 1889.

He formed a partnership, D. R. Thomas & Son, with his son, John Murchison Thomas, in 1892.

In 1898, he served again on the city council, during which he was on the special committee to build Savannah City Hall. He was also a member of Savannah's Sanitary Commission, which studied the city's sewerage and house drainage. He retired from the role in December 1905. The city, in appreciation of his services, named Thomas Park in his honor. He retired from all business in 1910.

== Death ==
Thomas died in 1915, aged 71. He is buried in Savannah's Laurel Grove Cemetery, along with his parents and wife, the latter of whom survived him by a decade.
