= Herman William Hesse =

American physician (1876–1944)

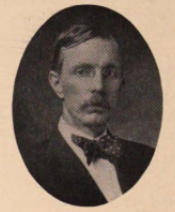
- Hesse around 1906
- Born: February 12, 1876; Savannah, Georgia, U.S.
- Died: November 24, 1944 (aged 68); Chatham County, Georgia, U.S.
- Resting place: Bonaventure Cemetery, Savannah, Georgia, U.S.
- Occupation: Physician
- Spouse: Mattie Hesse (1901–1944; his death)

Herman William Hesse (February 12, 1876 – November 24, 1944) was an American physician. He was eminent in Savannah, Georgia.

== Life and career ==
Hesse was born on February 12, 1876, in Savannah, Georgia, to Herman Sr. and Wilhelmina Struck, both German-born. They were married two years before Hesse's birth. His father, who was in the grocery business, died in 1901; his mother lived until 1929. He had three siblings: brothers Frederick and John, and sister Annie Henrietta. John was a dentist in Savannah.

After a preliminary education in the Savannah public schools, he graduated from Newberry College in Newberry, South Carolina, in 1895 with a degree of Bachelor of Arts. In 1900, he completed a course in the medical department of the University of Pennsylvania, where he received a PhD.

He undertook post-graduate work in Philadelphia and New York City, before setting up a practice in Savannah in the early 1900s. He was also visiting surgeon on the staff of St. Joseph's Hospital.

He married Brooklyn native Martha Catherine "Mattie" Wilfert on November 27, 1901, with whom he had two children: Marion (born March 1, 1902) and Herman W. Hesse III (born June 28, 1905).

Hesse was a member of the Medical Association of Georgia, was secretary of the Georgia Medical Society, and identified with the Knights of Pythias.

== Death ==
Hesse died on November 24, 1944, aged 68. He is buried in Savannah's Bonaventure Cemetery alongside his wife, who survived him by twelve years, and their son, who died in 1976.
