= Tybee Railroad =

Overview
- Locale: Georgia, U.S.
- Dates of operation: 1887–1933
- Successor: Central of Georgia Railroad

The Tybee Railroad, also known as the Tybee Branchline, was a railroad in the United States which operated from 1887 to 1933. Originally chartered as the Savannah & Tybee Railroad, it was purchased by the much larger Central of Georgia and operated as a branch line for most of its existence. At its peak, the railroad carried a quarter million people a year, with many vacationers using the train to reach resorts on Tybee Island. The railroad was instrumental in the economic development of the island as a regional resort, and the train even earned the nickname "The Marsh Hen". The construction of US 80 signaled the end of train service, and the line was abandoned in 1933.

== See also ==
- Daniel Gugel Purse Sr.
- Central of Georgia Railway
