= Gypsy Hill Park =

Park in Staunton, Virginia, US

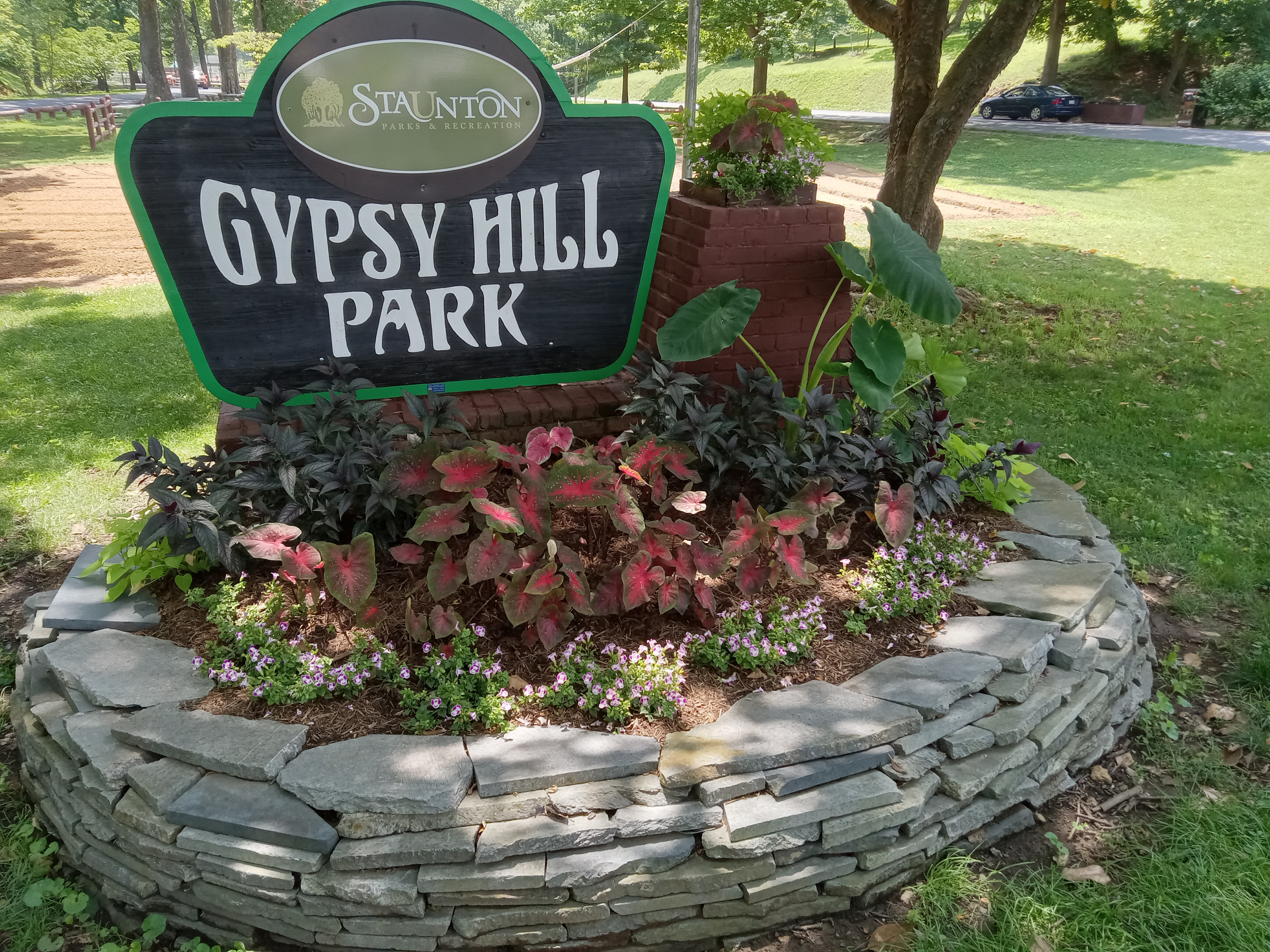
Sign at Gypsy Hill Park

Gypsy Hill Park is a recreational park situated in the center of Staunton, Virginia, United States, where Churchville Avenue and Thornrose Avenue intersect. The park contains various public services and attractions, including football and baseball fields, the Thomas D. Howie Memorial National Guard Armory, a large bandstand pavilion, a golf course, a basketball court, a gym, and the central duck pond equipped with food dispensers, allowing visitors to feed the ducks and fish. Throughout the park are picnic tables, grills and covered pavilions. Constitution Drive, an almost 1 1/2-mile-long (2.4 km) road, runs through the park and is often used as a walking and bike path.

== History ==
During the mid-1800s, the area now known as Gypsy Hill Park served as the water supply for the city of Staunton via a local pumping plant that utilized the many underwater springs found in the area. In order to protect the surrounding area, Staunton purchased approximately 30 acres of land by 1876. By 1890, the city had purchased 60 more acres. A proposal was presented to the city council, which subsequently created the park. After the proposal was approved, the lands between Churchville Avenue and the Baldwin Fair Association were designated as the perimeter for the new park, thanks to the planning of Staunton resident Captain William P. Tams, along with others. It came to be known as Gypsy Hill Park due to the many Romani people that camped in the area. In order to accommodate more park features, Staunton bought the Baldwin Fairgrounds, a local park which already had a slate of activities that drew people to the site. As the park grew, so did its attractions, including a zoo.

=== Stonewall Brigade Band ===
The Stonewall Brigade Band, a community-based band, has undergone various name changes during different periods; it was also known as the 5th Regiment Band (Civil War era), Second Corps Band, and Turner's Silver Cornet Band. In the mid-1800s, founder David W. Drake convinced his professor, A. J. Turner, to move to Staunton. Over the years, the band performed throughout Staunton, including Gypsy Hill Park. They performed for President Grant when he was in Staunton and have traveled and played at prestigious venues in cities such as New York and Chicago. The Stonewall Brigade Band has remained intact and still performs today.

=== Segregation ===
In 2008, a documentary about Staunton during the Jim Crow era debuted revealing the truth behind segregation laws in the city. Staunton citizen Rita Wilson, who eventually became a member of the city council and served for 16 years, spoke out about the issue. She recalled not being allowed into the park's premises. One day out of the year, blacks were allowed entrance. Since 1988, Staunton has held an African American Heritage Festival which focuses on various aspects of African American culture including various types of live music, crafts, presentations, and displays.

== Events ==
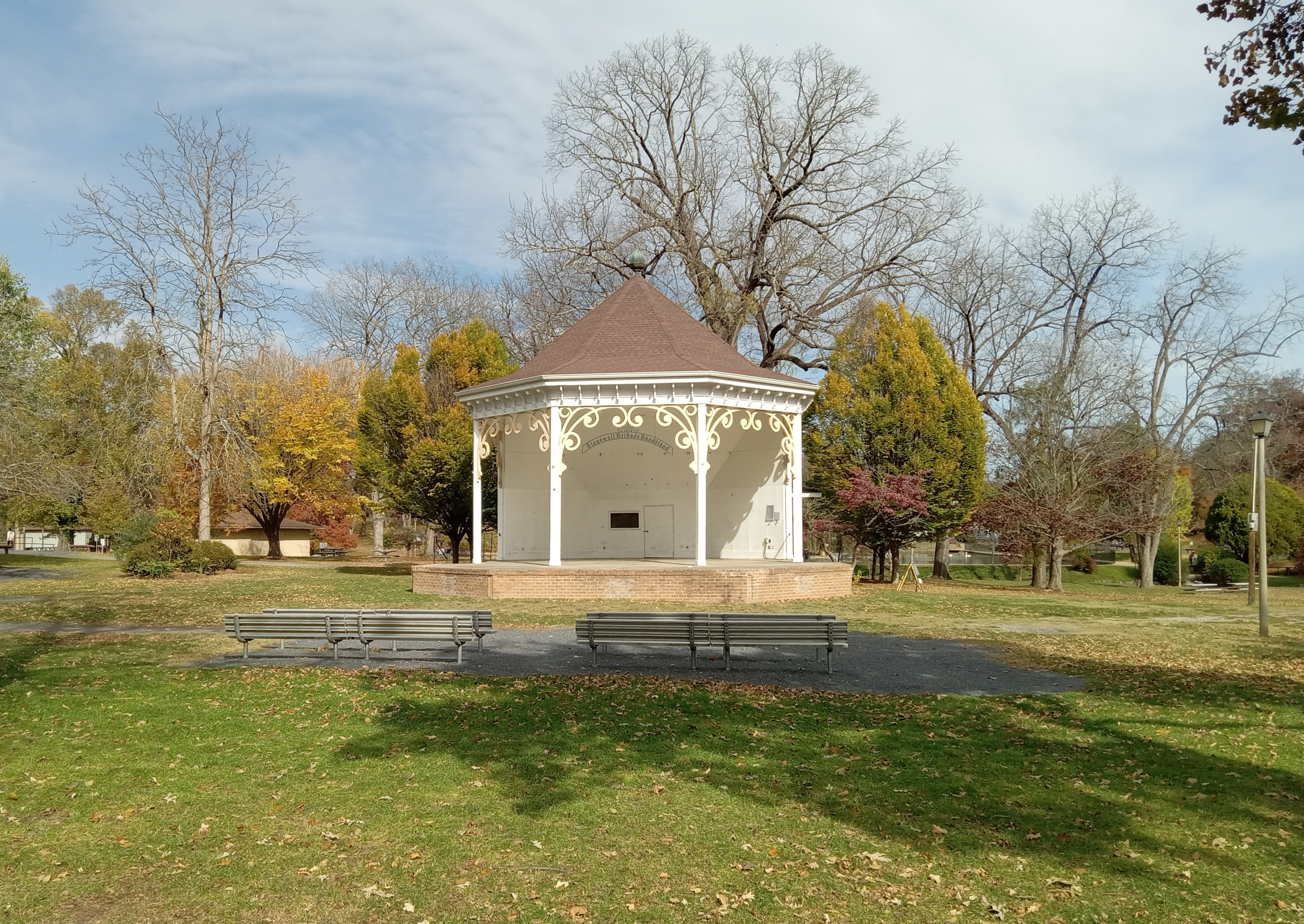
Stonewall Brigade Bandstand

During summer months, the park draws large crowds with a variety of free concerts and activities. Every Monday night, the Stonewall Brigade Band performs at eight p.m. Tuesday night is "Praise in the Park," where musicians perform faith-based music starting at seven p.m. Wednesday nights are reserved for bluegrass music, and Thursday nights are reserved for jazz performances, which are both held at seven p.m. On every other Friday night, a family-friendly movie is projected onto the pavilion at dark. The Staunton Parks and Recreation departments funds and supports all of the activities that take place throughout the course of the week and last until the end of August. The renowned country group, The Statler Brothers (also from Staunton), performed their music at the annual "Happy Birthday, USA" Fourth of July festival at the park. During winter months, Gypsy Hill Park is adorned with lights and decorations for the Christmas and holiday season. In addition to the live music, Gypsy Hill Park hosts an annual festival throughout the Memorial Day weekend called Art in the Park, where local artists, musicians, and vendors set up tents showcasing their artwork and wide selection of crafts. An array of performers take stage on the bandstand, and a designated children's craft station allows kids to participate in multiple activities.

== Attractions ==
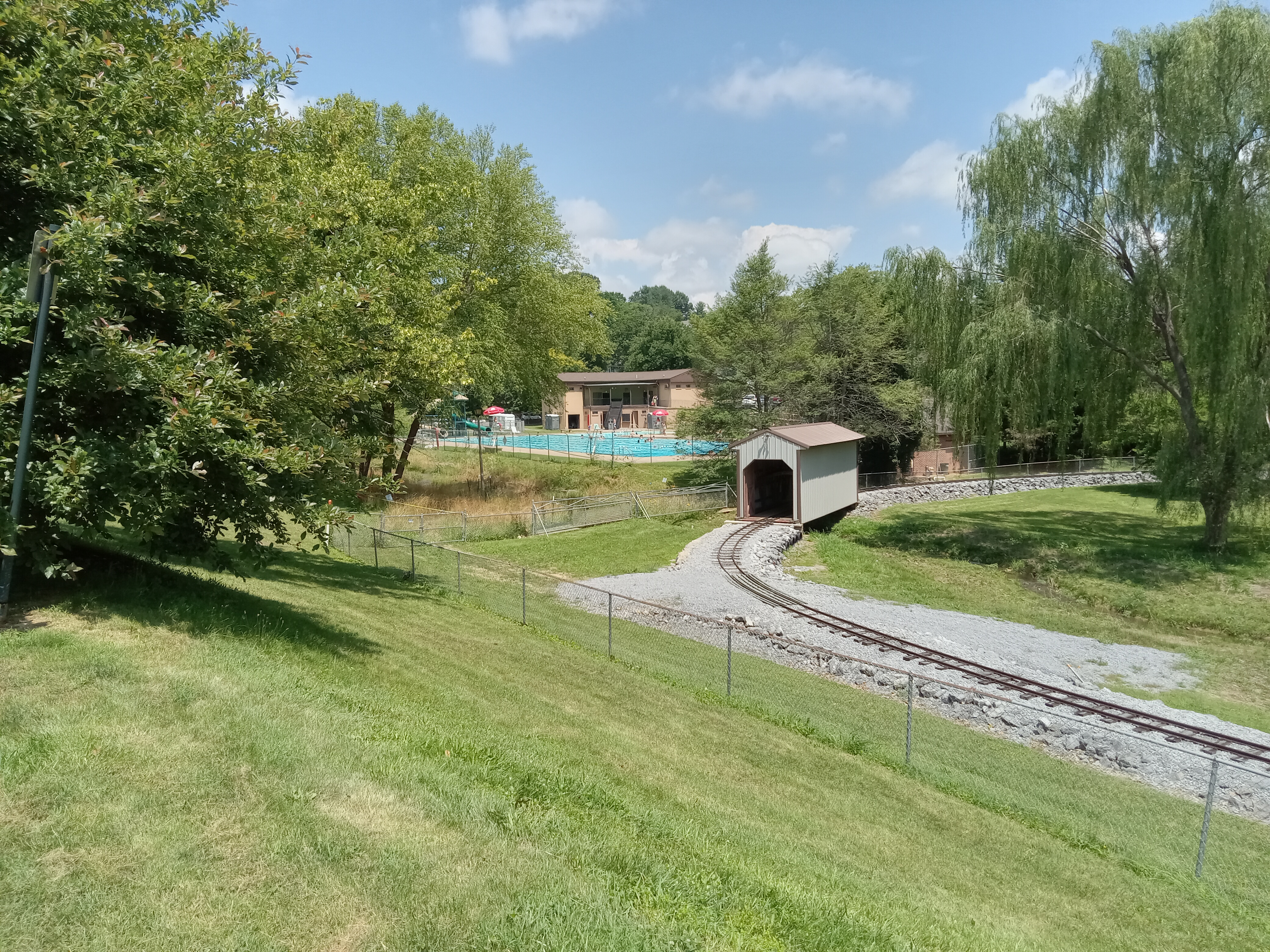
The pool at Gypsy Hill Park, with miniature train track in foreground

Gypsy Hill Park features a miniature train, the Gypsy Express, which began in 1958. The train operates passengers from May to October. Tickets cost one dollar. Presently, the train is maintained and operated by volunteers. Unique to the Gypsy Express is an Easy Access Car designed and built by volunteers to accommodate handicapped riders. A documentary recounts the history of the train.

The park also features an L-shaped Olympic-size swimming pool, with a "double pool slide." Admission to the pool is three dollars (children 3 and under are admitted free). A multiple-visit pass is also available (20 visits for fifty dollars).

== In artwork ==
Famous Shenandoah folk artist Grandma Moses, who was a resident of Augusta county for eighteen years, painted a picture of Gypsy Hill Park which sold on January 31, 2016, for almost six thousand dollars at the Augusta Expo in Fishersville, Virginia.

== Gallery ==
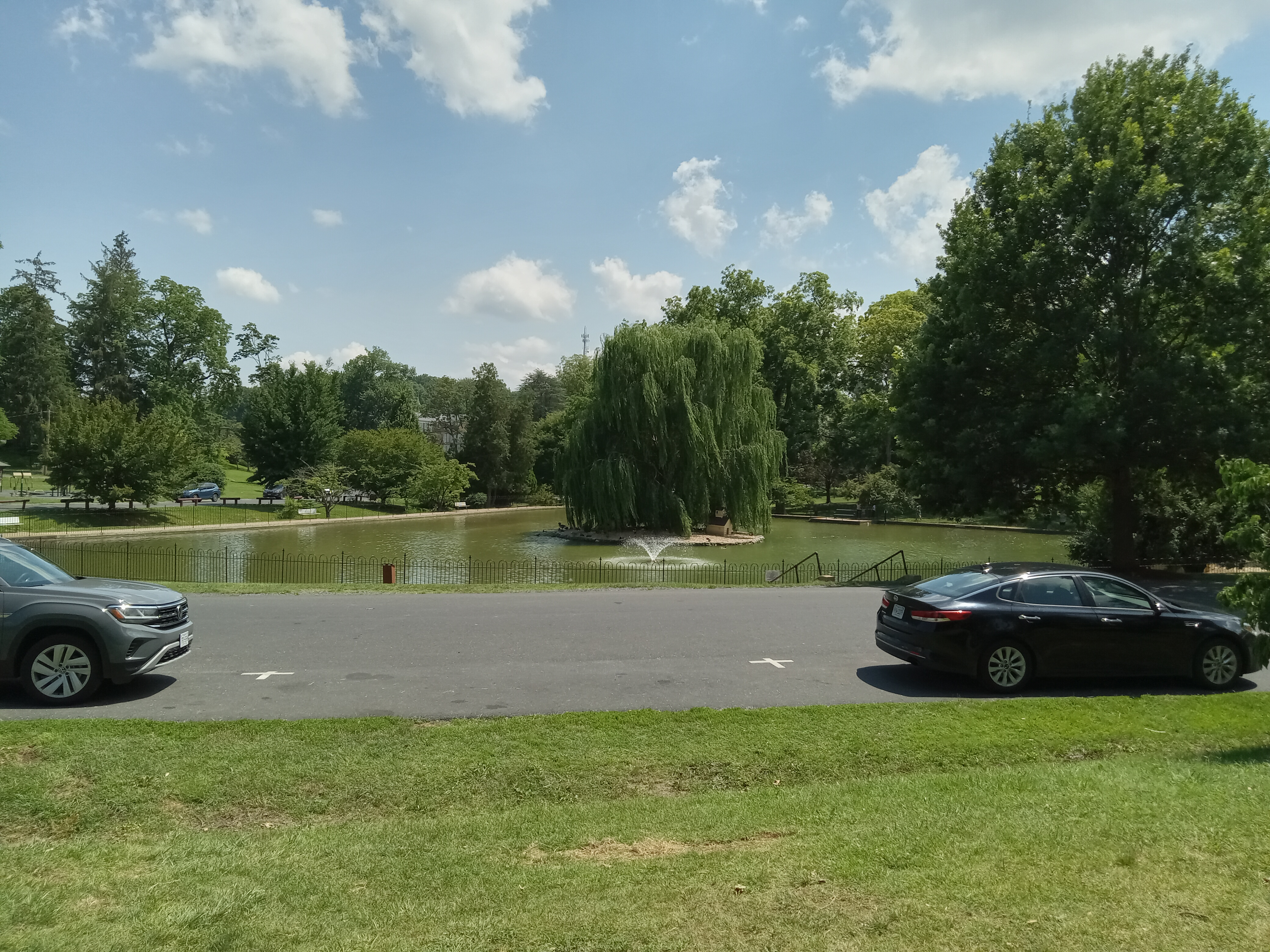
Duck Pond at Gypsy Hill Park with weeping willow on island

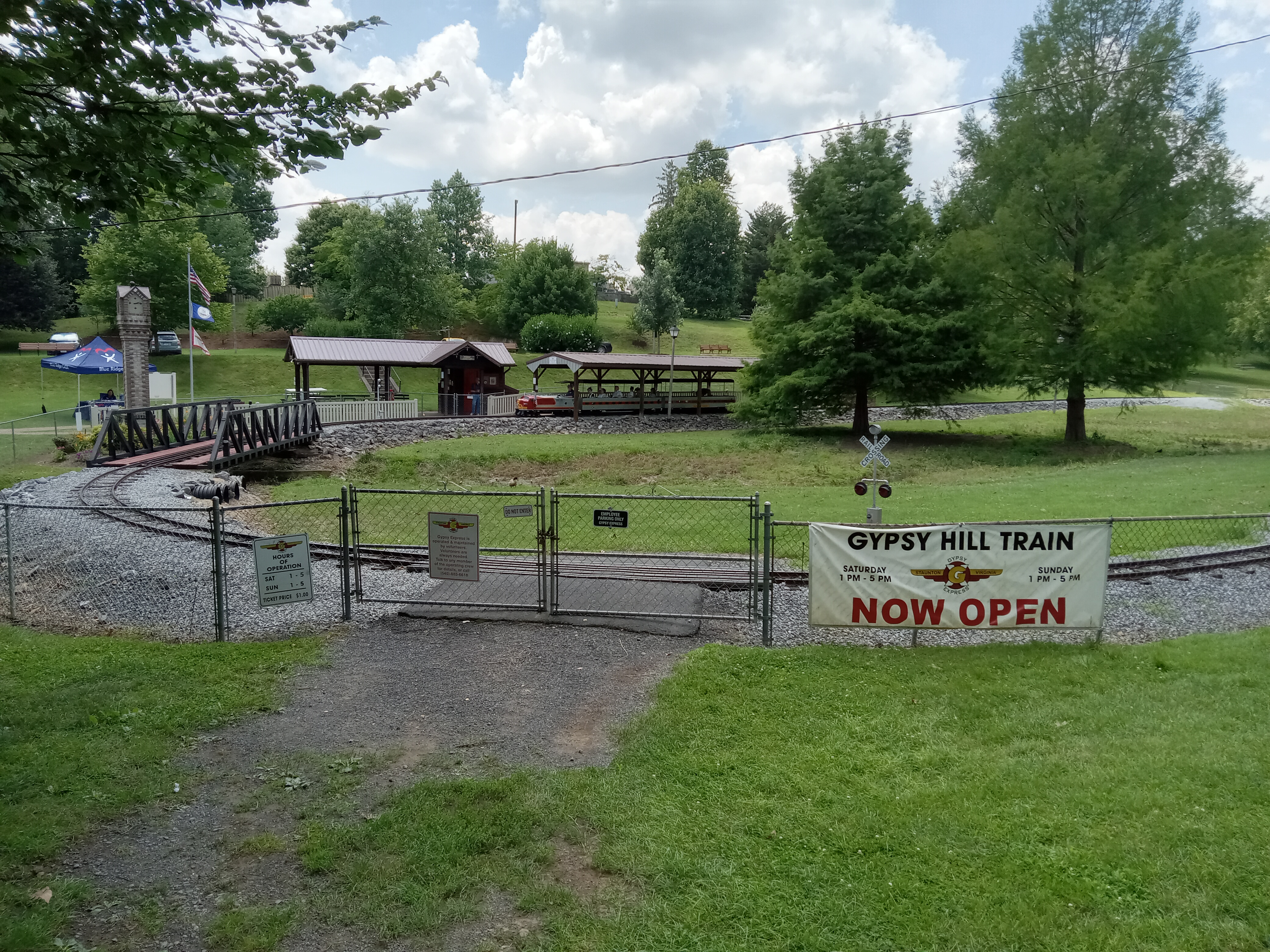
Gypsy Express preparing to leave the station

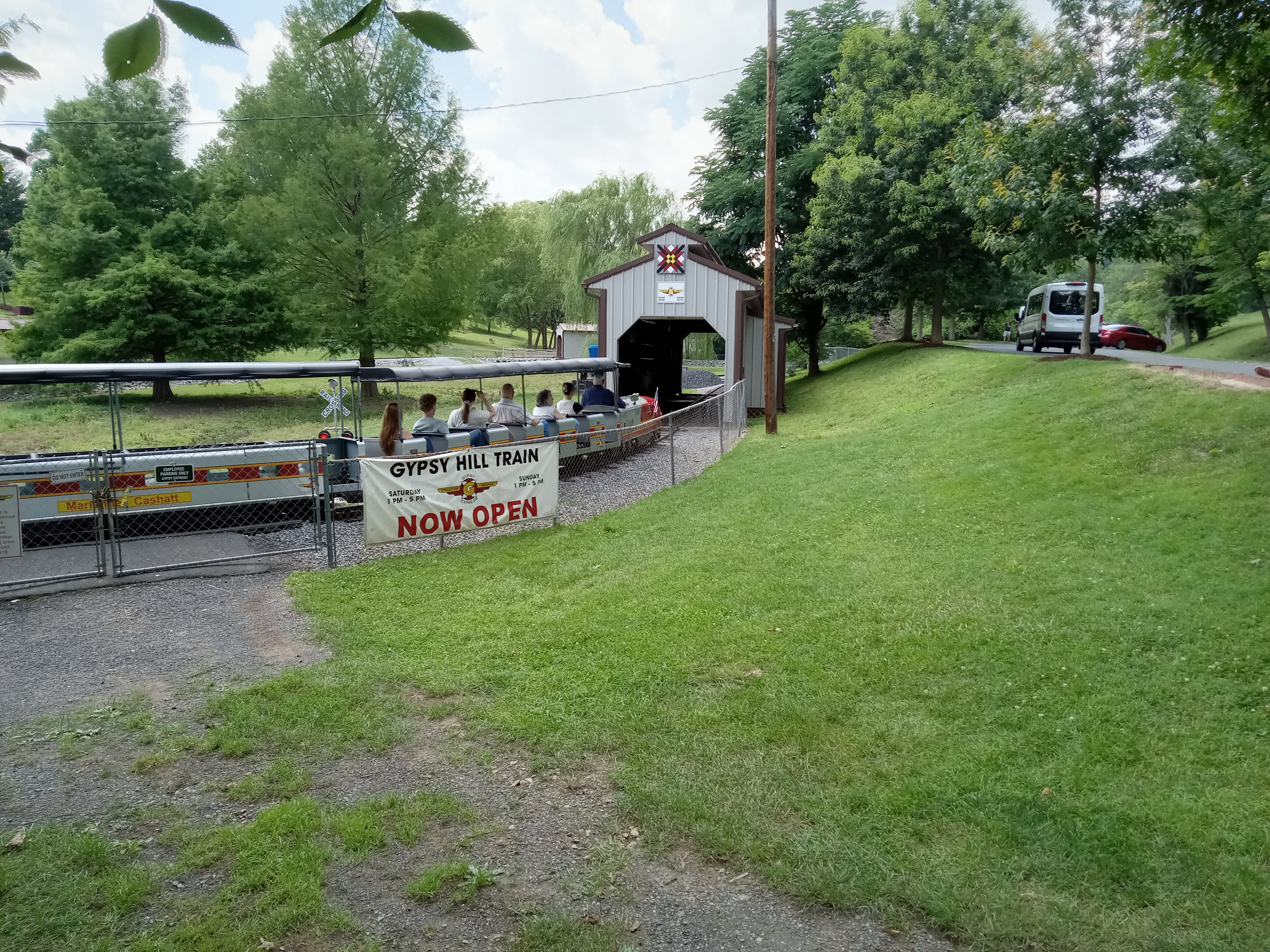
Gypsy Express entering covered bridge

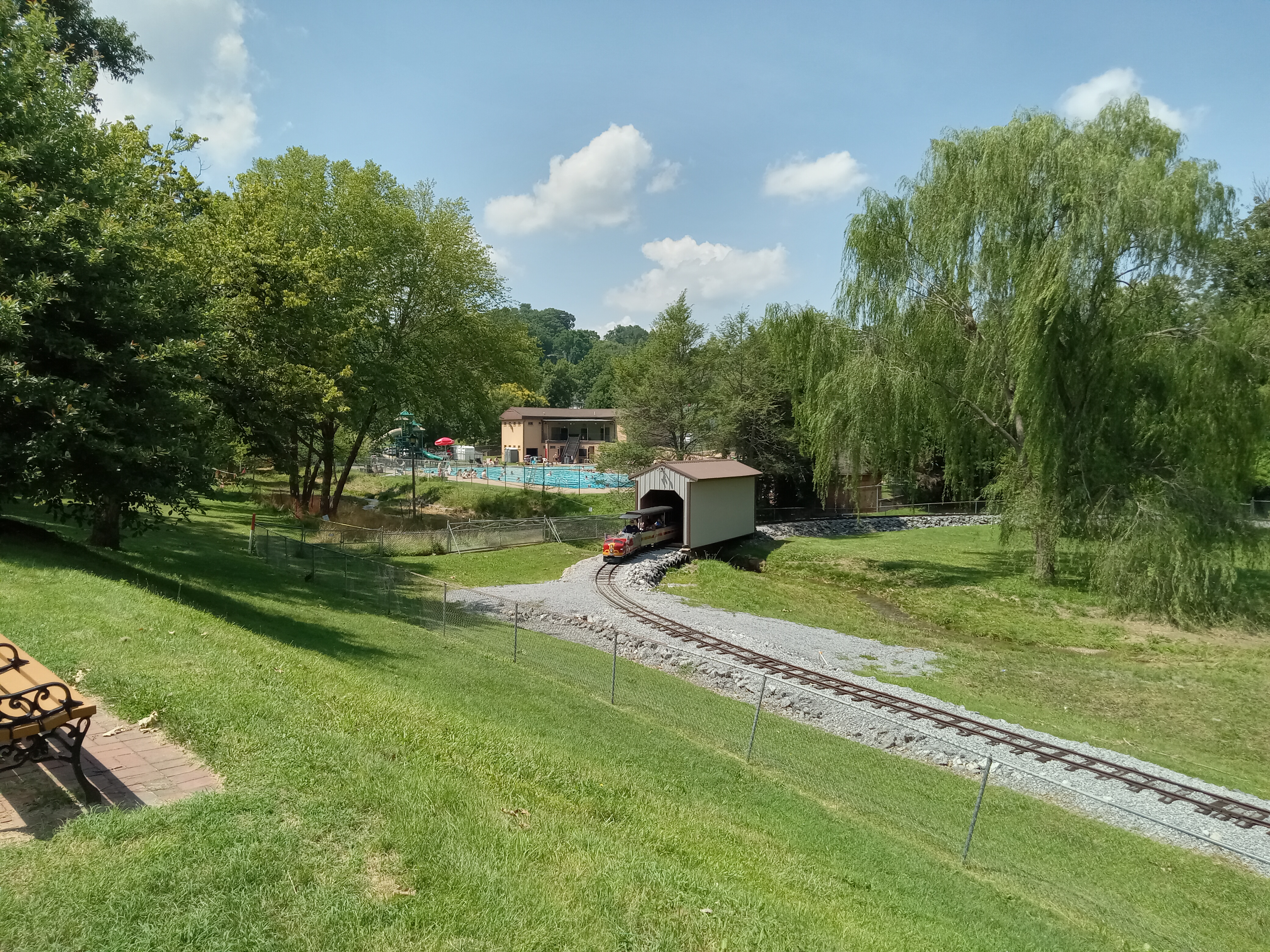
Gypsy Express emerging from the covered bridge

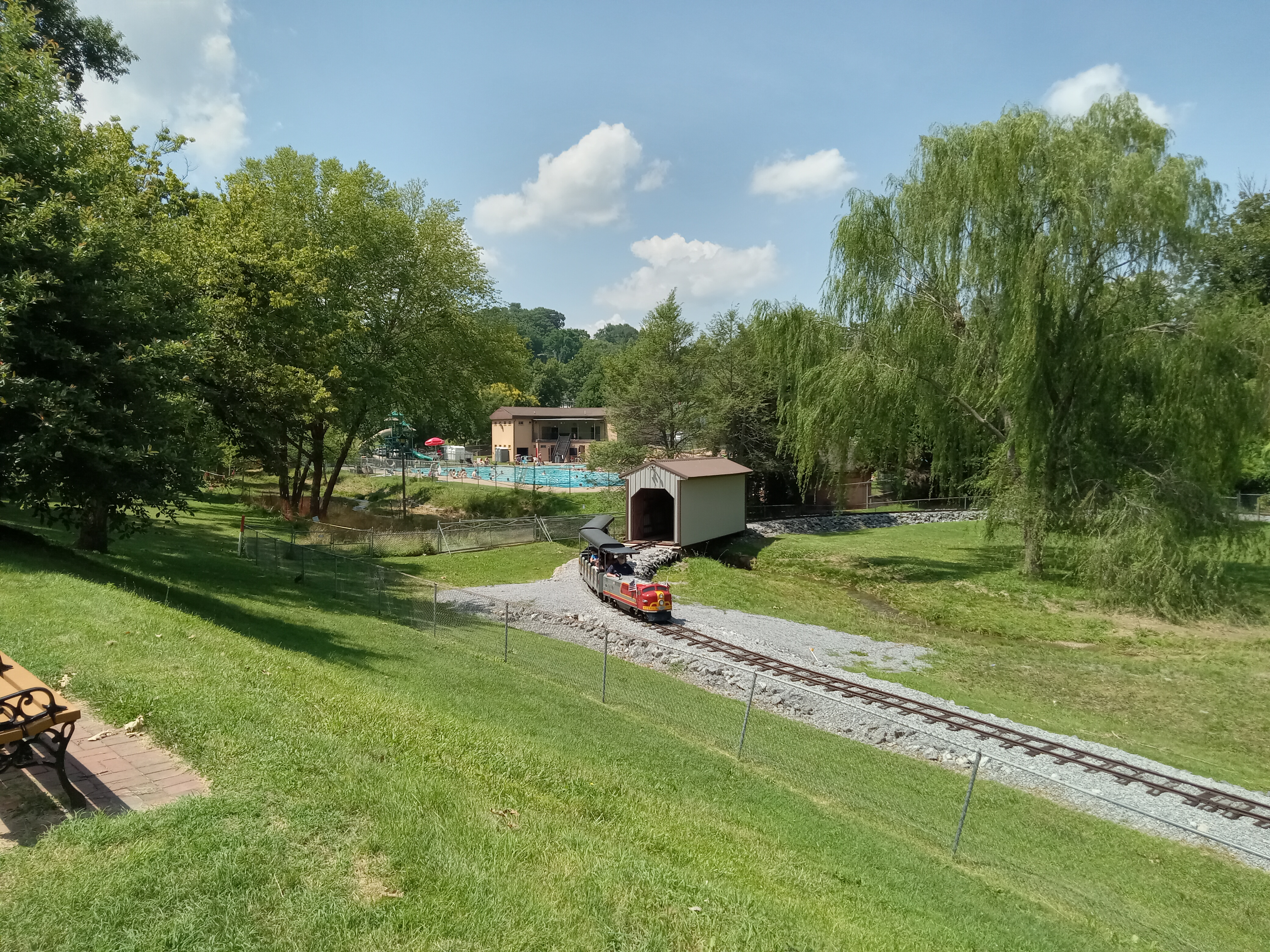
Gypsy Express rounding the tracks

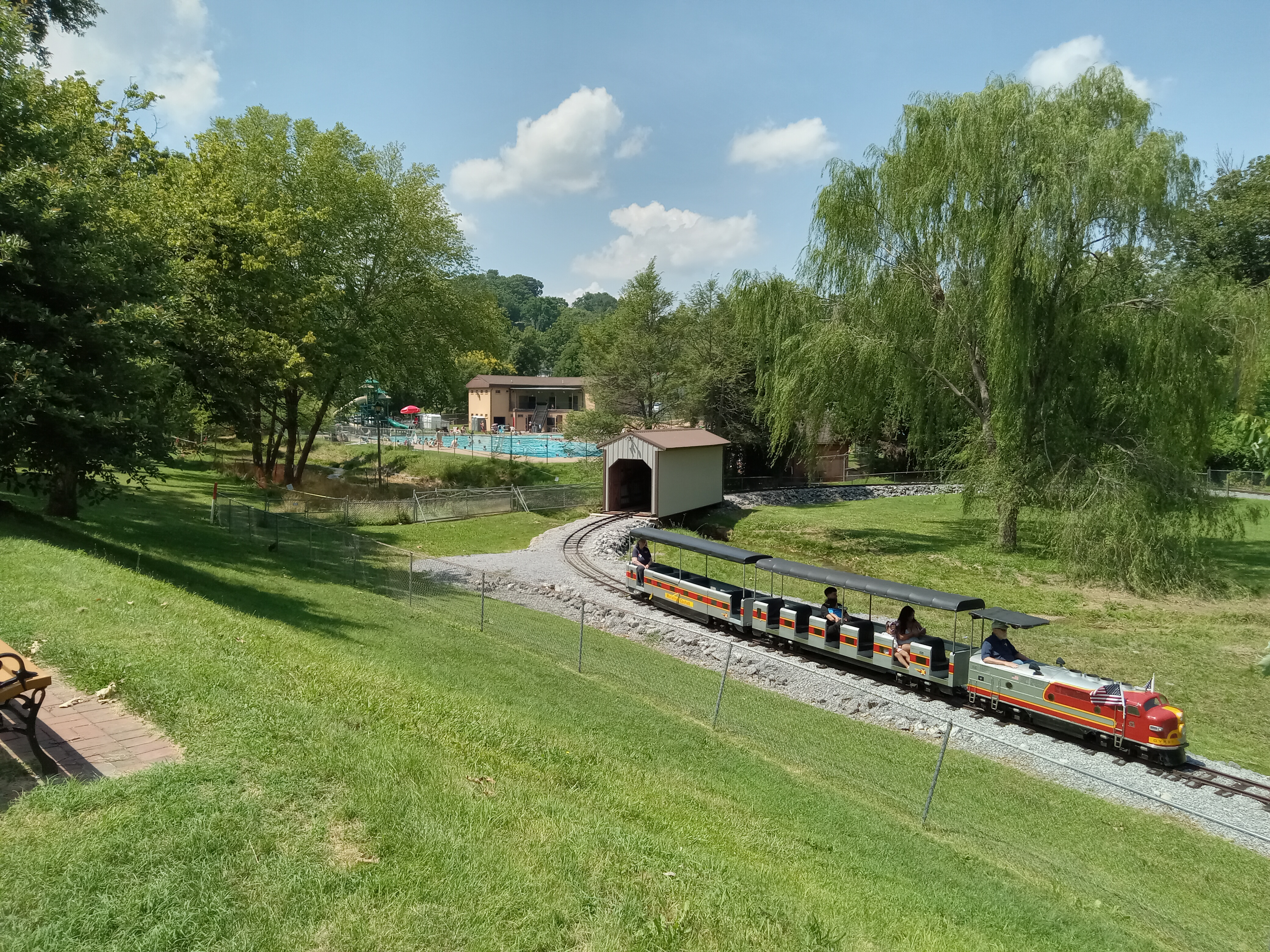
Gypsy Express rounding the tracks

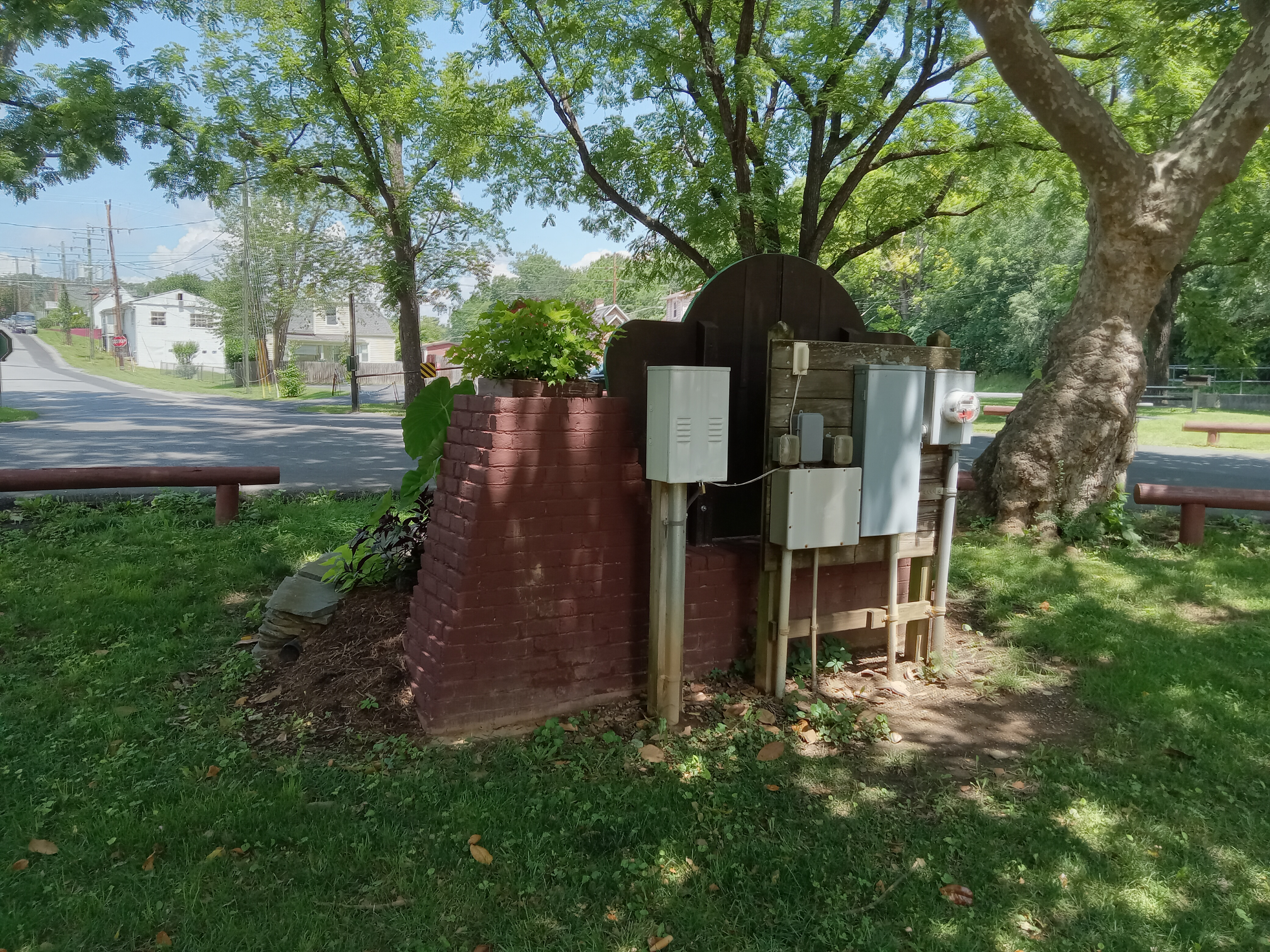
Back of Gypsy Hill Park sign, showing artfully hidden infrastructure
