= A. J. Turner =

American composer and pianist (1818–1905)

Augustus John Turner
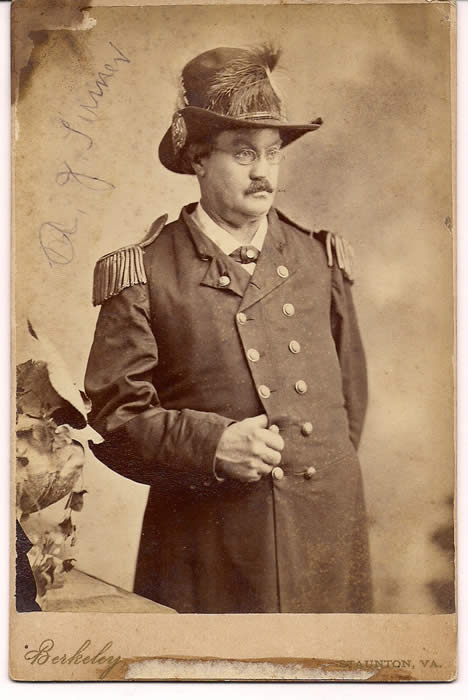
- Turner in Staunton, Virginia.
- Born: October 12, 1818; Spartanburg County, South Carolina, U.S.
- Died: May 14, 1905 (aged 86); Indianapolis, Indiana, U.S.
- Spouse: Kate M. Aby
- Children: Charles W. Turner; Thomas Memory Turner; Milton Stuart Turner; George Aby Turner; Frank C. Turner; Katherine Turner Wash; Cora Turner Freijs; Maude E. Turner; Claude Eugene Turner; Florence A. Bancroft; Carrie Turner
- Military career
- Allegiance: Confederate States of America
- Branch: Confederate States Army
- Service years: 1862
- Rank: Chief Musician
- Nickname: A. J.
- Units: Company Band, 5th Virginia Infantry; Company Band, 14th Virginia Cavalry
- Conflicts: American Civil War: Valley Campaign; Seven Days Battles; Battle of Cedar Mountain

Augustus John Turner (October 12, 1818 – May 14, 1905), known as "A. J. Turner", was an American composer, band leader and music professor.

He was the first director of the Stonewall Brigade Band of Staunton, Virginia, the oldest continuous community band funded by tax moneys in the United States. They were mustered into the Stonewall Brigade under Stonewall Jackson of the Confederacy during the Civil War. Turner served through the Valley Campaign, the Seven Days Battles, and was at the Battle of Cedar Mountain.

Turner was a professor of music at the Wesleyan Female Institute, the Staunton Male Academy, and the Deaf, Dumb, and Blind Institute. He also played a part in the temperance movement.

== Ancestry and early years ==
Augustus John Turner was born on October 12, 1818, in Spartanburg County, South Carolina, to Samuel M. Turner and Mahala Johnson Chapman. His father Samuel was a farmer living near the site of Fort Prince.

Both Turner's grandfathers fought in the Revolutionary War. His father Samuel's father was James Turner, who settled in South Carolina near Coulter's Ford on the Pacolet River with his father George Henry Turner, after the death of his mother Hannah Middleton in Virginia.

James Turner prepared beef for the patriots the night before the Battle of Cowpens. He married Margaret Headen. Horseshoe Robinson married Sarah Headen, making James Turner and Robinson brothers-in-law.

A. J. Turner's mother's father was Jack Chapman, a Revolutionary war captain in Virginia. Jack Chapman married the sister of Jammie Seay. Both Samuel Turner and Jack Chapman were active at Mount Zion Baptist Church, whose pastor was John Gill Landrum. On his death, A. J. Turner wrote this acrostic:

Lo! a Prince in Zion has been taken away.

And mourners thread the streets day after day.

No face is seen that does not deepest sorrow show;

Departed are our joys and only bitter woe

Remains, since thou, oh! Counselor and friend,

Unto thy grave are gone can no longer lend

Mankind thy sage advise - God pity on us send.

== Frederick County ==
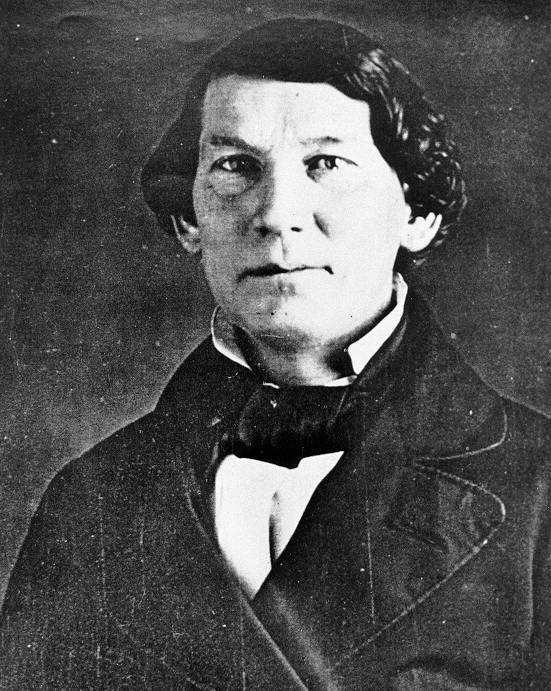
Turner once played with banjoist Joel Sweeney (pictured).

Before moving to Staunton, Turner lived in Middletown and Newtown (now Stephen's' City), near Winchester in Frederick County, Virginia. He married Catherine ("Kate") Montrose Aby on July 1, 1845, in Middletown. The ceremony was performed by John Allemong. Kate Aby's father was a shoemaker and veteran of the War of 1812. Her mother, who lived at Thorndale Farm, was the daughter of a drummer in the American Revolution.

In 1846, a son was born in Newtown, Charles W. Turner. Turner also spent time at Greenville, where he played with the famous banjoist Joel Sweeney in 1847, and organized a band in Middlebrook. In 1847 a second son was born in Middletown, T. M. Turner. In 1849 a third, M. S. Turner.

Turner's house in Newtown was destroyed in a fire on December 1, 1856.

== Staunton ==
Turner moved to 26 Fayette Street in Staunton by 1858. He eventually moved to 15 Fayette Street in Staunton. He grew tomatoes in his garden.

=== Stonewall Brigade Band ===
In Staunton, Virginia, in 1855, David W. Drake sought help in founding a band. He enlisted the help of Turner, his former music teacher in Newtown, persuading him to move to Staunton. Together with two other citizens of Staunton, they formed the Mountain Saxhorn Band. Turner was the band's first director, and it is still active today, the oldest continuous community band funded by tax moneys in the United States.

They gave their first formal concert on July 17, 1857, at Union Hall on Beverley Street in Staunton. At the concert on December 1, 1857, Turner was presented by lawyer A. H. H. Stuart and the band with a silver cornet.

By 1859 the band had come to be known as Turner's Silver Cornet Band. At Armory Hall on April 4, 1861, Turner's Silver Cornet Band, together with the Staunton Musical Association and the Glee Club, presented the last concert to be given before the Civil War. Turner played the soprano cornet.

==== Civil War ====
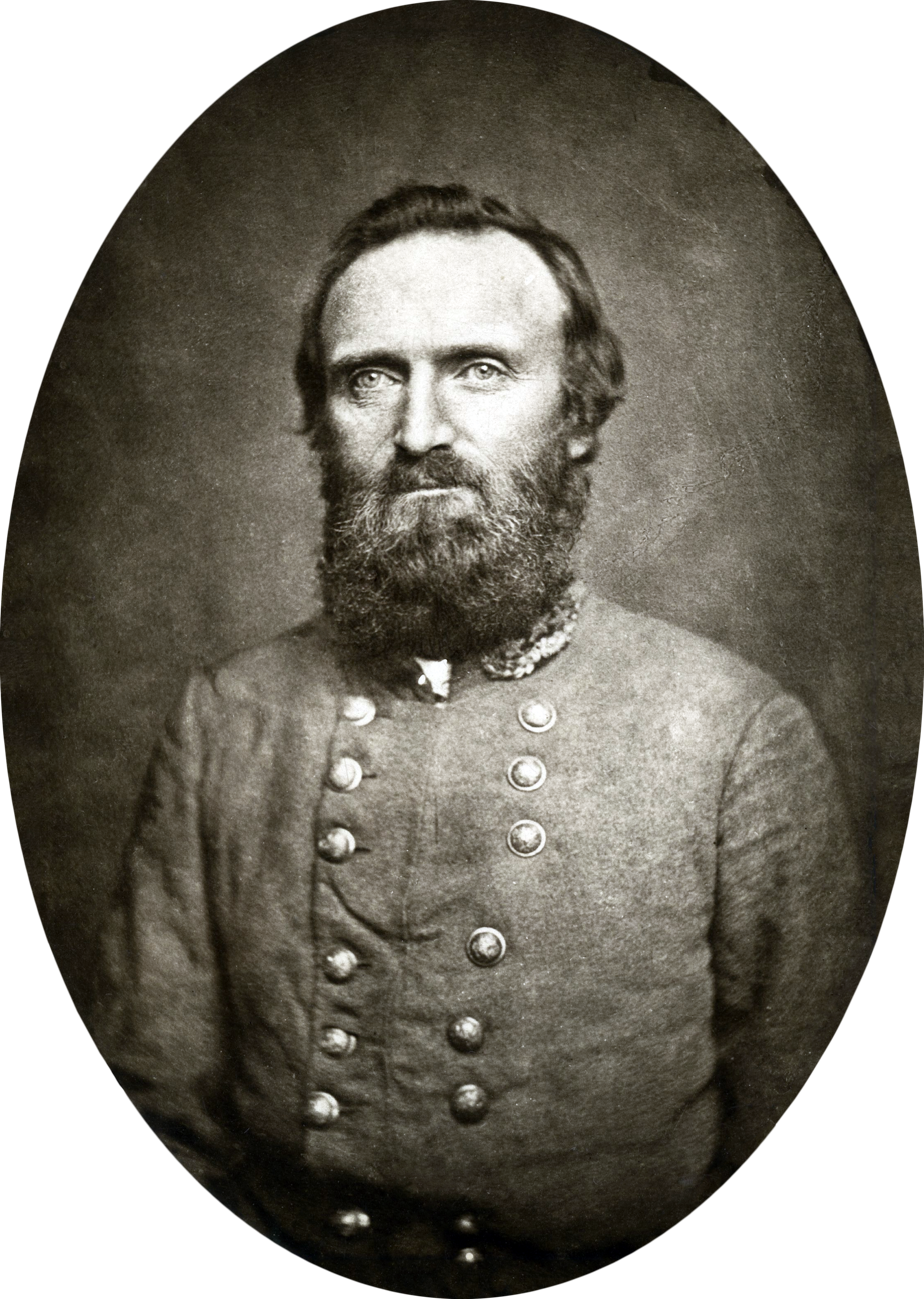
Turner was Stonewall Jackson's (pictured) band leader.

The band was mustered into the 5th Virginia Infantry Regiment under Stonewall Jackson and Colonel William S. Baylor, and left Staunton on April 17, 1861. Soon after the Battle of First Manassas, the band earned the name Stonewall Brigade Band, and has been known as such ever since.

As well as playing their instruments, band members fought and acted as couriers and letter bearers or medical assistants. In addition to entertaining the troops in the field, the band frequently appeared in concerts in Fredericksburg, Richmond, Staunton, and elsewhere to support recruiting rallies, clothing drives, and war relief fundraising.

An account of the Battle of Hoke's Run in the Staunton Spectator reads: "Little Charley Turner, a boy about 15 years of age, insisted so strongly on going with the Augusta Guards that his father finally yielded to his importunities and allowed him to go. The result shows that little Charley went to perform service, for he made one of the enemy bite the dust." Though not in the band, Turner's first son Charles was an orderly and courier for Stonewall Jackson.

A. J. Turner and his son T. M. Turner enlisted for the Confederacy on April 1, 1862. They served through the Valley Campaign, the Seven Days Battles around Richmond, and were at the Battle of Cedar Mountain. They were discharged because of age (A. J. too old and T. M. too young) on August 22, 1862. They were then in the Churchville Cavalry Troop, 14th Virginia Company I for a time, commanded by James A. Cochran.

==== Post-war ====
The band was reorganized in 1869 with Turner as leader and his son T. M. Turner as assistant leader. A. J. Turner directed the band until 1884. In 1881, he organized Fravel's Cornet Band in Woodstock.

=== Music teacher ===
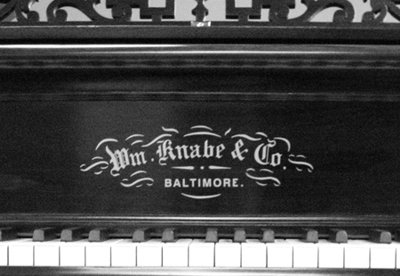
Turner sold Knabe pianos.

Turner could play many instruments. An 1860 advert for his services reads, "Teaches Piano, Guitar, Flute, Violin, &c, &c; also Ballad Singing". An 1896 ad reads, "Prof. A. J. Turner respectfully solicits a class of young people of both sexes in music ... Instruments: violin, piano, guitar, mandolin, cello and cornet." One source reads "Prof. Turner seems perfectly at home in the business of music. With the facility of the ready artist, he passes from instrument to instrument, as if the whole armory of the muse of song, from the harp to the organ, were his playthings." Turner could even play a recognizable tune on a common tin dinner horn.

He tuned pianos, and was also an agent for the sale of Knabe and Stieff pianos.

==== Wesleyan Female Institute ====
Turner's first job in Staunton was teaching vocal and instrumental music at the Wesleyan Female Institute, next to the Methodist Church, and across from Trinity Episcopal Church. (Note: Many of the best-known composers of the time taught similarly at private girls schools, including George Root and Charles Grobe.)

==== Deaf, Dumb, and Blind Institute ====
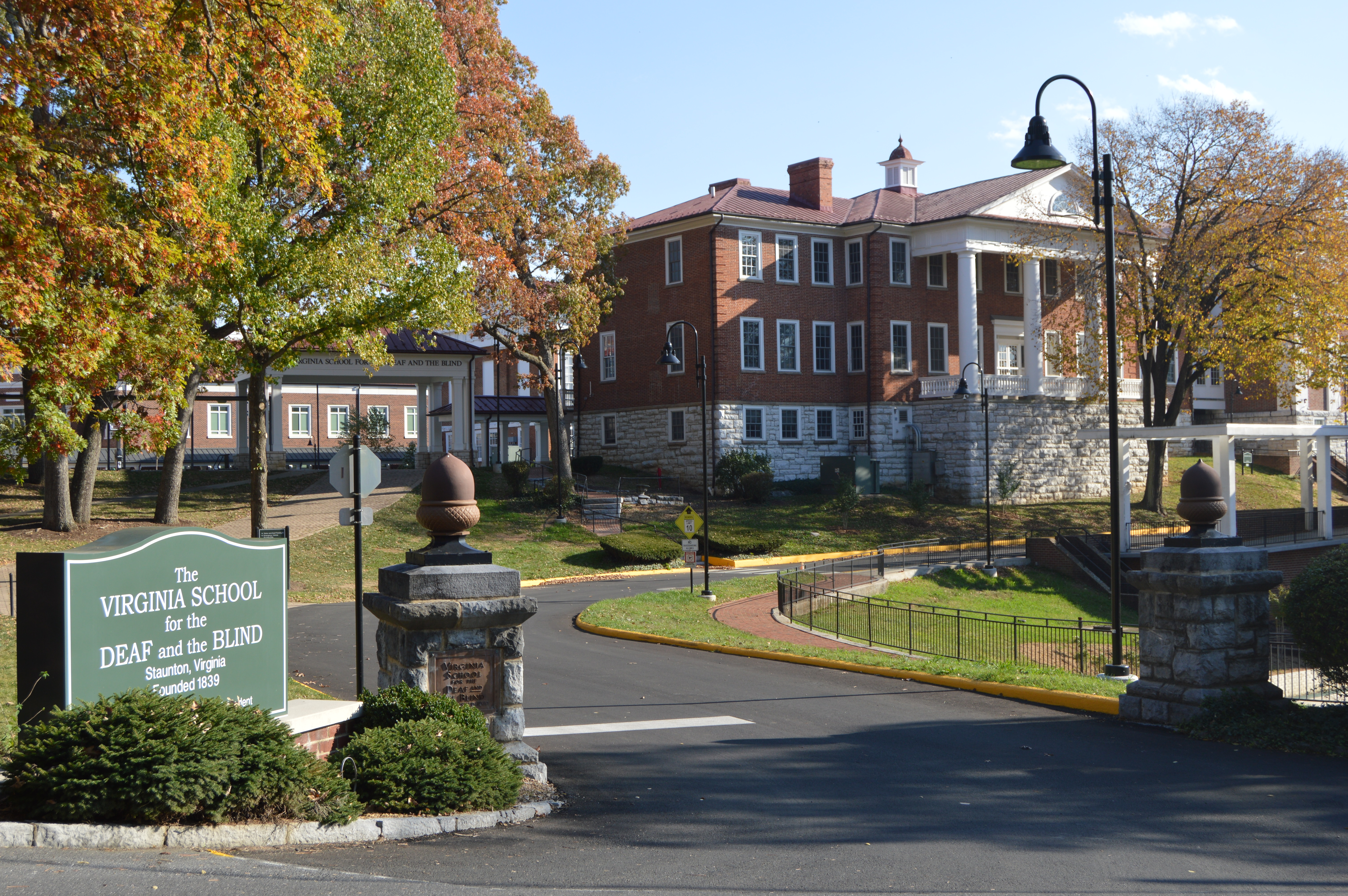
Turner taught music at Staunton's Deaf, Dumb, and Blind Institute (pictured).

Turner was appointed professor of music at the Deaf, Dumb, and Blind Institute in November 1866, replacing William C. Graham. Turner taught the blind pupils until the 1890s. (Note: His salary was increased $200 in 1871.) He "evolved many of the methods now in vogue for giving blind children a musical education." One account of the institute's annual concert praises the pupils for "a high degree of musical taste and talent".

==== Staunton Male Academy ====
In 1888-89, Turner was a professor of music teaching piano, violin, guitar, and cornet at the Staunton Male Academy. (Note: Cartographer Jed Hotchkiss taught geography and physiography.)

=== Temperance ===
Turner was active in the temperance movement and in 1878 was elected the Most Worthy Grand Chief of the Sons of Jonadab, for the district covering Virginia and West Virginia.

== Indianapolis ==
Turner left for Indianapolis, Indiana, in 1900 to live with his daughter Cora Turner Freijs. He would reside there until his death in Washington Township. His former house in Staunton sold for $3,350 soon after his death.

== List of compositions ==
- "Gallopade", 1857
- "At Eve Beneath Stars' Soft Light: or Memories of Old", 1858
- "Bessie Bell Waltz", 1858
- "Pray Maiden, Pray", 1864, lyrics by A. W. Kercheval. (Note: Bobby Horton of Ken Burns fame has a rendition of the song.)
- "Palmetto Schottisch", 1864
- "Spring time polka", 1864
- "La Perle", 1875, melody by J. P. Kavenaugh, arranged for piano by A. J. Turner
- "Dedication March", 1879
- "Peyton Summerson's Funeral March", 1879

== Bibliography ==
- Brice, Marshall Moore (1967). The Stonewall Brigade Band.
- Couper, William (2005). The Corps Forward.
- Casler, John Overton (1906). Four Years in the Stonewall Brigade. Appeal Publishing Company. p. 48.
- Griffith, H. P. (1885). The life and times of Rev. John G. Landrum. Philadelphia, H. B. Garner.
- Künstler, Mort (2006). The Civil War Paintings of Mort Künstler. Cumberland House. ISBN 9781581825565.
- Landrum, J. B. O. (1897). Colonial and Revolutionary History of South Carolina. Greenville, S.C., Shannon & co., printers.
- Landrum, J. B. O. (1900). History of Spartanburg County. Atlanta, Ga., The Franklin prtg. and pub. co.
- Moss, Bobby (1991). The Patriots at the Cowpens.
- Robertson, James I. (1977). The Stonewall Brigade. LSU Press. ISBN 9780807103968.
