= Charles Turner =

Charles or Charlie Turner may refer to:

== Politicians ==
=== American ===
- Charles E. Turner (politician) (1886–1936), American real estate developer and mayor of Dallas, Texas
- Charles H. Turner (attorney) (1936–2018), U.S. attorney for Oregon
- Charles Henry Turner (politician) (1861–1913), U.S. representative from New York
- Charles W. Turner (attorney) (1846–1907), adjutant general of Montana
- Charles Turner Jr. (1760–1839), U.S. representative from Massachusetts
- Chuck Turner (1941–2019), Boston councilor

=== British ===
- Charles Turner (MP) (1803–1875), MP for Liverpool, South Lancashire and South West Lancashire
- Sir Charles Turner, 1st Baronet, of Warham (1666–1738), British member of parliament for King's Lynn, 1695–1738
- Sir Charles Turner, 1st Baronet, of Kirkleatham (c. 1727–1783), British member of parliament for York, 1768–1783
- Sir Charles Turner, 2nd Baronet (1773–1810), British member of parliament for Hull, 1796–1802

=== Canadian ===
- Charles Turner (Canadian politician) (1916–1993), Liberal MP for London East, then senator from Ontario

== Arts ==
- Charles Henry Turner (painter) (1848–1908), American painter
- Charles Yardley Turner (1850–1918), American painter
- Charles Turner (engraver) (1774–1857), English engraver
- Charles Tennyson Turner (1808–1879), British poet
- Charles Turner (English composer) (1907–1977), minor English composer, who took the last pre-war photographs of Hitler
- Charles Turner (musician) (1936–2006), American jazz trumpeter

== Sciences ==
- Charles E. Turner (botanist) (1945–1997), American botanist
- Charles Henry Turner (zoologist) (1867–1923), American zoologist, early pioneer in the field of insect behavior
- Charles Turner (engineer) (1901–1994), New Zealand mechanical and civil engineer, engineering administrator and consultant
- Charles A. Turner (1877–1943), American inventor and movie theater owner

== Sports ==
- Charles Turner (Australian cricketer) (1862–1944), Australian cricketer
- Charles Turner (English cricketer) (1862–1926), English cricketer
- Charles Turner III (born 2001), American football player
- Charley Turner (1862–1913), African American boxer
- Charles Turner (water polo) (born 1953), Australian water polo player in the 1980 and 1984 Olympics
- Charlie Turner (Canadian football) (1944–2024), American football player in the CFL
- Charlie Turner (footballer) (1910–?), Irish association footballer

== Other people ==
- Charles Turner (British Army officer) (died 1826), British soldier and colonial administrator
- Charles W. Turner (Medal of Honor) (1921–1950), American soldier and Medal of Honor recipient
- Charles Turner (bishop) (1842–1923), suffragan bishop of Islington
- Charles Turner (merchant) (1773?–1856), British businessman, now known as a collector and gardener
- Charles Arthur Turner (1833–1907), British jurist
