= Grobe (name) =

Grobe is a given name and surname. Notable people with this surname include:

- Donald Grobe, American lyric tenor
- Frank Grobe (born 1967), German politician
- Jim Grobe, American American football player and coach
- Charles Grobe, American composer
- Wolfgang Grobe, German football player and coach
