= Charles William Turner =

Charles William Turner may refer to:

- Charles W. Turner (Medal of Honor) (1921–1950), American soldier and Medal of Honor recipient
- Charles W. Turner (attorney) (1846–1907), Adjutant General of Montana
