= William C. Graham =

William C. Graham may refer to:

- Bill Graham (Canadian politician) (William Carvel Graham, 1939–2022), Canadian politician and lawyer
- William C. Graham (music professor) (c. 1817–1866), American music professor
