= General Turner =

General Turner may refer to:

- Abraham J. Turner (1970s–2010s), U.S. Army major general
- Alfred Edward Turner (1842–1918), British Army major general
- Charles W. Turner (attorney) (1846–1907), Adjutant General of Montana
- James Turner (soldier) (1615–c. 1686), Adjutant-general of the Scottish army
- John Wesley Turner (1833–1899), U.S. Army brigadier general and brevet major general
- Richard Turner (Canadian Army officer) (1871–1961), Canadian Army lieutenant general
- Thomas R. Turner II (born 1955), U.S. Army lieutenant general
- Tomkyns Hilgrove Turner (1764–1843), British Army general
- William Turner (British Army officer) (1907–1989), British Army lieutenant general
- Yaakov Turner (born 1935), Israeli Air Force brigadier general

== See also ==
- Attorney General Turner (disambiguation)
