= Attorney General Turner =

Attorney General Turner may refer to:

- Edward C. Turner (1872–1950), Attorney General of Ohio
- Richard C. Turner (1927–1986), Attorney General of Iowa

== See also ==
- General Turner (disambiguation)
