= Charles A. Turner =

American inventor (1877–1943)

Charles Augustus Turner
- Born: April 2, 1877; Lewisburg, West Virginia, US
- Died: November 24, 1943 (aged 66); Tampa, Florida, US
- Occupation: Inventor
- Spouse(s): Katie B. Fletcher; Fannie L. Eugenia C. Sauter
- Children: 10

Charles Augustus Turner (April 2, 1877 – November 24, 1943) was an American inventor. Alongside his inventions, he was a movie theater owner.

== Early years ==
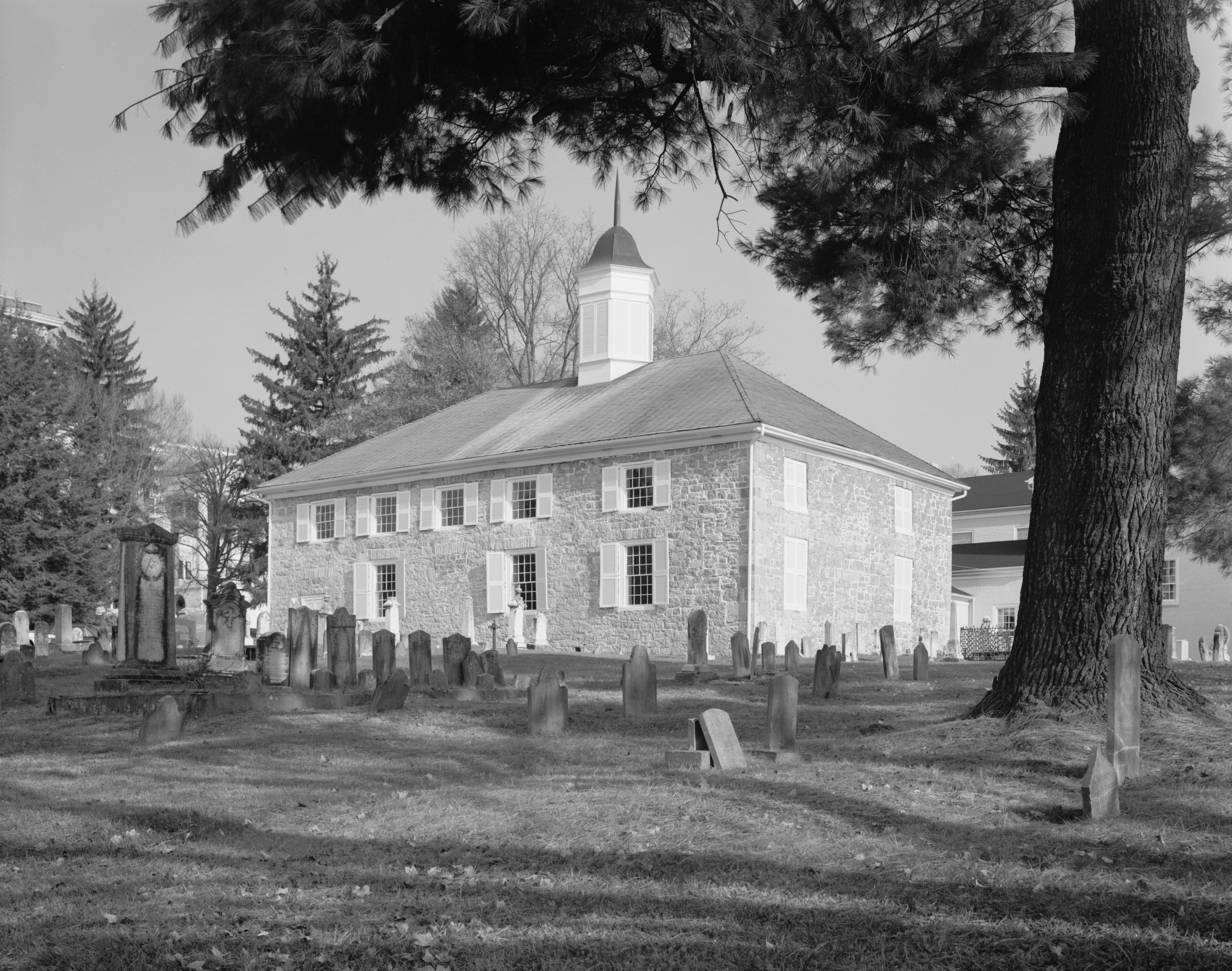
Turner's mother and brother are buried at the Old Stone Church (pictured)

Charles Augustus Turner was born on April 2, 1877, in Lewisburg, West Virginia, to music professor T. M. Turner and Kate Grimes, who was the daughter of physician Gassaway Sellman Grimes.

His mother Kate died in Lewisburg on October 14, 1888, and his brother Claude died in Lewisburg on September 5, 1889, at the age of 14, falling headforemost into a vat of boiling water at the Greenbrier Cannery. Both are buried at the Old Stone Church.

== Norfolk and Portsmouth ==
Turner lived in Norfolk, Virginia from 1895 to 1911. He lived in nearby Portsmouth from 1912 to 1915.

=== Marriages ===
Turner married Katie B. Fletcher from Staunton in Philadelphia, Pennsylvania, on October 10, 1897. She died on December 9. (Note: Her father Richard Fletcher lost a leg at Gettysburg.) He then married a woman named Fannie, who died on September 15, 1899.

Turner married Eugenia C. Sauter, the daughter of machinist Antoine Sauter in Norfolk, Virginia, on October 27, 1902. The marriage was performed by St. Mary's pastor, Rev. John Doherty.

Turner served as a police officer from 1899 to 1902. He then got a job as a weigh master at Lambert's Point.

=== Inventions ===
The Incubator Building at the Jamestown Exposition.

Turner invented a coal and grain trimming machine known as the Turner Cargo Trimming Machine. In 1906, the Mechanical Loading & Trimming company was formed with $200,000 capital stock. He received foreign and domestic patents.

During the Jamestown Exposition of 1907, the ventilation system for the baby incubators proved unsatisfactory. Turner was consulted and authorized to invent and install an entirely new one.

In 1909, Turner invented a fishing rod and a talcum powder box. The talcum powder box could be used with only one hand. In 1910, the Turner Product Company was started with a capital of $40,000, with Turner being the vice-president. In 1914, the American Products Corporation was incorporated to manufacture and sell talcum powder with capital ranging from $6,000 to $10,000 as needed, with Turner being the secretary-treasurer.

=== Movie theaters ===
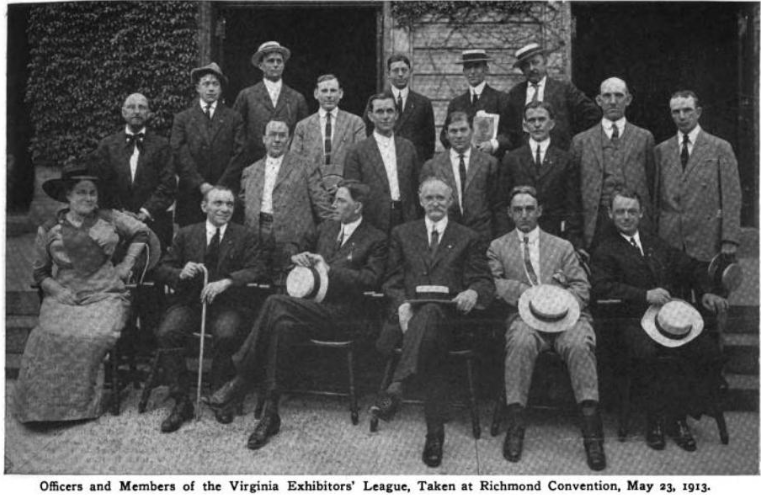
Charles Turner (bottom right) at a gathering of the Virginia Exhibitors League.

Turner also managed movie theaters in Portsmouth, including the Palace from 1910 to 1914 and Columbia in 1915. In 1912, the Palace caught fire, spreading to nearby buildings. Turner's house was lost in the flames as he had no insurance. Despite this, the Palace recovered. Turner was elected vice president at the convention of May 23, 1913, held at the Jefferson Hotel in Richmond. He was an officer of the Virginia state branch of the Motion Picture Exhibitors League of America.

== Hopewell ==
Turner lived in Hopewell, Virginia from 1915 to 1925. He was manager of the American Patents Company. He worked with DuPont as a sheet metal foreman until they closed the ammunition plant after the First World War.

=== Charity ===
Turner was chairman of the local Red Cross chapter, at the corner of Seventh Avenue and Poythress Street, supervising all its work for eight years. He was vice president of the Chamber of Commerce. He was president of the Day Nursery Association for six years. He organized the DuPont Volunteer Firemen's Association in 1917. He operated a public park and playground for two years. He was also a probation officer for six years, working without pay.

In the aftermath of the First World War, Hopewell saw 1,015 women and children without a husband, who was forced to look for work elsewhere, that were taken care of by DuPont and the Red Cross. "Throughout it all, Turner was the outstanding figure." It was remarked that in Hopewell, Turner was "greeted by practically every man, woman and child as "Charlie".'

In 1923 Turner was director of the newly created Department of Public Welfare, which did the work previously done by the Red Cross. He resigned as Red Cross chairman but was appointed executive secretary.

== Atlanta and Tampa ==
Turner lived in Atlanta, Georgia, from 1926 to 1929. He was manager of Digestamint Laboratories, which produced a hiccup and indigestion remedy.

Turner lived in Tampa, Florida, on Dekle Avenue from 1930 until his death in 1943. His wife Eugenia died in 1940.
