= World-Wide Baraca and Philathea Union, Incorporated =

The World-Wide Baraca and Philathea Union, Incorporated was founded by Marshall A. Hudson in 1890 in Syracuse, New York. This group was a Christian ecumenical movement designed to facilitate adult evangelism through Bible study. At its peak it had over a million members during the early twentieth century. Its growth was fueled by young adults and teenagers who felt a need to reconcile experiences between their churches and their own life in an increasingly industrial American society. Hudson had been a business owner in Syracuse, New York, selling tableware and utensils.

The group began as a men's Bible class, called Baraca. Baraca comes from a Hebrew word for blessing. The goal of the instruction was to make happy or “bless” every man who came into the group, and the class tried to have an engagement with its members every night. Men and women were encouraged to study in separate classes with separate rooms. The separate women’s class was started by Hudson’s daughter, Mae in 1893 and eventually called Philathea. Philathea means lover of God in Greek. A major component in Hudson's bible classes, was a plan for the young men and women to pray (at noon) every day for the “salvation” of non-members.

Early classes were formed around a strong organization, an enthusiastic social life, and a spiritual focus. The adult class movement flourished for 30 years and then was absorbed into the various Protestant denominations, so that most American communities (at least in the eastern United States) had a Baraca or Philathea Union. Its existence as an independent movement greatly diminished after that.

The Philathea group (also called the Philathean Society) was known in the 20th century for its willingness to permit women into its roles of leadership. Particularly after World War 2, the organization diminished with the advent of “teen culture”. By the dawn of the 21st century, the organization had sold its headquarters in Mt. Vernon, VA and transferred its documents to the Gordon–Conwell Theological Seminary in Massachusetts.

== Notable people ==
- Lena Northern Buckner (1875–1939), social worker
