= T. M. Turner =

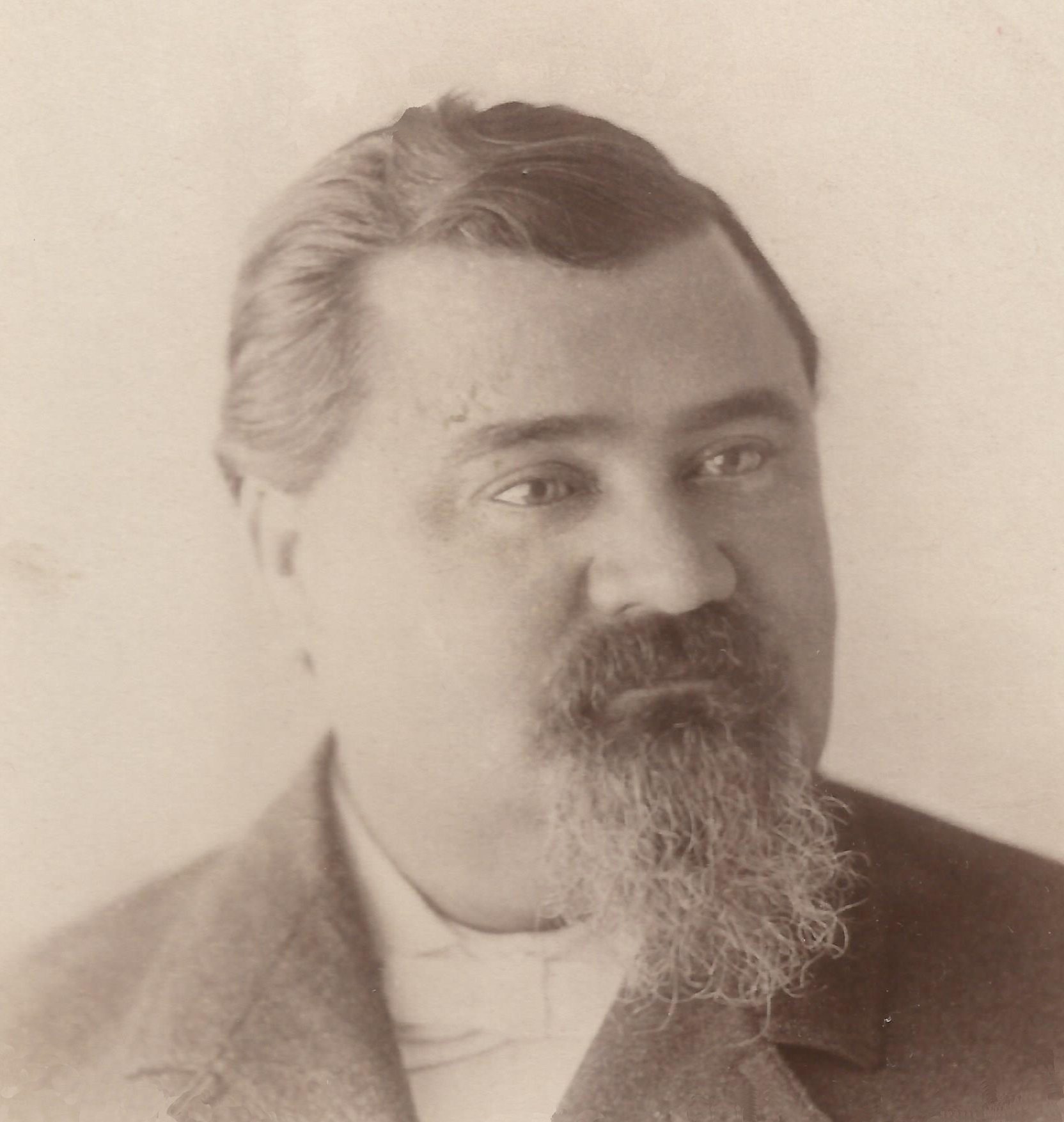
- Born: Thomas Memory Turner; July 17, 1847; Middletown, Virginia, US
- Died: September 2, 1917 (aged 70); Norfolk, Virginia, US
- Occupation: Music professor
- Spouses: Kate Grimes; Nannie Wyatt; Mary Goddard
- Children: 5, including Charles A. Turner

T. M. Turner
- Military career
- Allegiance: Confederate States of America
- Branch: Confederate States Army
- Service years: 1862–1865
- Rank: Musician
- Units: Company Band, 5th Virginia Infantry; Company Band, 14th Virginia Cavalry
- Conflicts: American Civil War: Valley Campaign; Seven Days Battles; Battle of Cedar Mountain

Thomas Memory Turner (July 17, 1847 – September 2, 1917) was an American composer, band leader, and music professor. He was known to his friends as "Mem".

He was once assistant director of the Stonewall Brigade Band of Staunton, Virginia, the United States's oldest continuous community band sponsored by local government and funded, in part, by tax monies. His father A. J. Turner was director. They were mustered into the Stonewall Brigade under Stonewall Jackson of the Confederacy during the Civil War. Turner served through the Valley Campaign, the Seven Days Battles, and was at the Battle of Cedar Mountain.

Memory trained several cornet bands, and spent several years directing the band at the Western Lunatic Asylum. He tuned pianos for most of his life.

== Early years in Staunton ==
Thomas Memory Turner was born on July 17, 1847, in Middletown, Virginia to A. J. Turner and Kate Aby, and moved to Staunton with them in the mid to late 1850s.

=== Civil War ===
Turner served in the Confederacy for much of the American Civil War. His father A. J. was a band leader in the Stonewall Brigade Band in the Stonewall Brigade. Thomas Memory was a musician alongside his father in the 5th Virginia Infantry from April 1 to August 22, 1862, playing the B♭ cornet. He was later in the 14th Virginia Cavalry band, enlisting at Brandy Station on August 1, 1863. He was taken prisoner and paroled on April 30, 1865, in Winchester, at the age of 17.

=== Stonewall Brigade Band ===
The Stonewall Brigade Band was reorganized in 1869 with Turner as assistant leader and his father as leader.

== First marriage ==
Turner married Kate Grimes of Maryland, daughter of Dr. Gassaway Sellman Grimes, on February 28, 1872, in Warren County, Virginia. They were married by Rev. Amasa Converse, the man who married Edgar Allan Poe and Virginia Eliza Clemm Poe. A daughter, Susan Dorsey Turner, was born there in 1874. Turner instructed the Charlestown Cornet Band in 1874 and 1875. They adopted the name the Mechanics Silver Cornet Band. Turner also tuned pianos in Charlestown.

== Lewisburg ==
Turner lived in Lewisburg, West Virginia from 1876 until November 1879. A son, Charles Augustus Turner, was born there. Memory Turner's job is listed as a goldsmith on his birth record. Turner directed the Lewisburg Concert Band. His sister Cora would sing for them. He also was a jeweler and watchmaker.

== Return to Staunton ==
Turner returns to Staunton in November 1879, and lived on 12 Madison Street. He continued to play in the Stonewall Brigade Band. He directed the "Stonewall Octette", a group of singers attached to the band. Turner's brother Stuart Turner was the group's organist.

At a rally for Hancock and English just before the election of 1880, Turner composed "Hancock's Grand March". After the assassination of President Garfield, Turner also composed a dirge, "Garfield's Funeral March".

=== Watchmaker ===
Turner ran a jewelry store in Olivier's Bookstore on 102 E. Beverley Street (also known as Main Street) now a part of the historic district. Turner fixed watches and jewelry as well as offered his services tuning instruments. He continued to tune pianos. (Note: A square piano showing markings indicating it was tuned by Turner belongs to the National Music Museum of Vermillion, South Dakota.)

== Return to Lewisburg ==
Turner again instructs a band in Lewisburg in 1884, and is living there by 1889, living at Alderson and Hinton in between. Turner fixed watches and jewelry and instruments at the Lewisburg Hotel. His wife Kate dies in Alderson on October 14, 1888. His son Claude died in Lewisburg, on September 5, 1889, at the age of just 14, falling headforemost into a vat of boiling water at the Greenbrier Cannery. Both Kate and Claude are buried at the Old Stone Church.

== Second Return to Staunton ==
After the death of his wife and son, Turner again returned to Staunton in late 1890, and lived at 213 W. Beverley St.

=== Western Lunatic Asylum ===
He became director of the Blackford Cornet Band of the Western Lunatic Asylum, a quartette, then octette, then a ten- or eleven-piece band composed of the male attendants. He was paid $6 a week and an extra $3 if he tuned the pianos.

One account reads "The music of the Hospital Band sets aside solitude and relieves the monotony of asylum life, and has a wonderful effects in quieting the noisy and disturbed patients, besides being a source of great pleasure and enjoyment to the more quiet class, and is greatly enjoyed by visitors to the institution."

=== Second marriage ===
On February 15, 1893, he married Virginia Ann "Nannie" Wyatt in Harrisonburg, Virginia, at the residence of Hubert or Herbert Coffman. They were married by C. R. Cruikshank at the home of Dr. Rives Tatum. She died March 9, 1894, in Staunton.

== Maryland ==
From 1896 to 1897 Turner was in Baltimore and Gaithersburg. In Gaithersburg, he taught a band, and attended a reunion of the Central Brass Band, which he had instructed.

== Norfolk ==
Turner settled near Lambert's Point in Norfolk late in life, where he taught music. He died there September 2, 1917.

== Bibliography ==
- Brice, Marshall Moore (1967). The Stonewall Brigade Band.
