= Lena Northern Buckner =

American social service, civic, religious leader (1873–1939)

Lena Northern Buckner (née, Northern; August 6, 1875 – December 6, 1939) was an American social worker, a pioneer in this work among patients at the Oteen Veterans Administration Hospital. She was also a civic and religious leader in North Carolina.

== Early life and education ==
Lena Mary (or Marie) Northern was born in Lexington, Virginia, August 6, 1875.

She was educated at Ann Smith Academy, Lexington, and Wesleyan Female Institute, Staunton, Virginia.

== Career ==
She was identified with social and charitable work in North Carolina, having been especially active in the Baraca-Philathea Union of North Carolina, an organization dedicated to Christian service among the poor and needy. Buckner was elected general secretary of the Union in July 1917, and since that time, the society came into special prominence through its work in the United States Public Health Service Hospitals and other places where sick and wounded former service men and women were cared for. A unique and very successful feature of this work was the "Pollyanna" game, inaugurated by Buckner. The names of sick soldiers and sailors were put in capsules and given to girls who agreed to play Pollyanna to their "Capsule" for 30 days, sending some little reminder to the invalid every day, such as letters, candy, cake, fruit, or anything that would cheer the monotonous life of a hospital patient. At the end of a month, the girl disclosed her identity, and the game could be continued if desired. A similar game, called "Daddy Long Legs", was inaugurated for sick nurses.

The Baraca-Philathea Union was very helpful in cooperating with the Law Enforcement League of North Carolina to make the Prohibition laws more effective. Buckner was a member of the board of directors of the latter organization, and convention secretary for the term 1921-23. She was also a field secretary for the Anti-Saloon League of North Carolina, and was active in reporting violations of the Prohibition laws.

Buckner was affiliated with the Asheville Club for Women, North Carolina Baraca-Philathea Association (general secretary), national Baraca-Philathea group (vice-president), and the United Daughters of the Confederacy.

== Personal life ==
She married Neptune Buckner, of Asheville, North Carolina, July 19, 1898, (Note: According to the Knoxville (Tenn.) Tribune via the Lexington Gazette, the wedding took place July 21, 1898.) and thereafter made her home in Asheville. The couple divorced in August 1939.

Lena Northern Buckner died in Asheville, December 6, 1939.
