= Wesleyan Female Institute =

- Type: Women's college
- Active: 1846–1900
- Affiliations: Methodist Episcopal Church, South
- Location: Staunton, Virginia, US

Wesleyan Female Institute was a college for women in Staunton, Virginia, founded by the Baltimore Conference of the Methodist Episcopal Church, South in 1846. Its former site is a parking lot next to the Methodist church, across the street from Trinity Church, from 1850 to 1870. The first classes were held in the basement of the Methodist church, then moved to the Chandler Building before securing the spot next to the Methodist church. After 1870, the school moved to Madison Place. The school went bankrupt in 1900.

== Notable people ==
=== Alumni ===
- Lena Northern Buckner, social worker

=== Presidents ===
- Rev. J. R. Finch
- William S. Baird (1860–1866)
- Rev. William A. Harris, (1877–1885)
