= M. S. Turner =

American musician and piano tuner

- Born: September, 1849; Middletown, Virginia
- Died: January 6, 1910 (aged 60); Hinton, West Virginia
- Occupation: Music professor

Milton Stuart Turner (September 1849 – January 6, 1910) was a music professor and piano tuner. In 1872 he was appointed professor of music at the Charleston Female Institute. He played the organ.

== Early years ==
Milton Stuart Turner was born in September 1849 in Middletown, Virginia, to music professor A. J. Turner and Kate Aby.

== Staunton ==
His composition "Sun of my Soul, Thou Savior Dear" received praise: "In resetting to music the words of a song which has long been a familiar favorite of all lovers of sacred music, Mr Turner....has produced a composition of considerable merit."

== Death ==
On January 6, 1910, in Hinton, West Virginia, he fell and fractured his skull, resulting in his death.

== List of compositions ==
- My Heart is Thine, lyrics by A. W. Kercheval, 1877
- Sun of my Soul, Thou Savior Dear, 1879
- Spring Song Waltz, 1879
- Jesus, Refuge of my Soul, 1900
- The Brakeman's Farewell, 1902
