= Charles E. Turner (botanist) =

American botanist (1945–1997)

Charles Edward Turner (1945–1997) was an American botanist.

He grew up in Indianapolis, Indiana. He obtained his Bachelor of Arts in biology at Wabash College in 1967. He studied at the University of Washington where he earned a Master of Science in botany in 1969. He then went to the University of California, Berkeley where he studied plant nutrient systems under George Herbert Baker and received his PhD in 1981. His dissertation focused on the nutrient system of Sagittaria, weed of plantation rice in the Central Valley of California.

Turner began his association with the USDA-ARS in 1981, when he joined the biological control of weeds laboratory . He moved to Albany, California for postdoctoral research on plant competition with Lloyd Andres. In 1983, he began work on the biological control of yellow star thistle (Centaurea solstitialis). In 1995, he became the director of the Biological Control Laboratory USDA-ARS for Brisbane, Australia, where he led the fight against Melaleuca quinquenervia, an invasive plant in the Florida Everglades. The standard author abbreviation C.E.Turner is used to indicate this person as the author when citing a botanical name.
