= Jammie Seay House =

Historic house in South Carolina, United States

- U.S. National Register of Historic Places
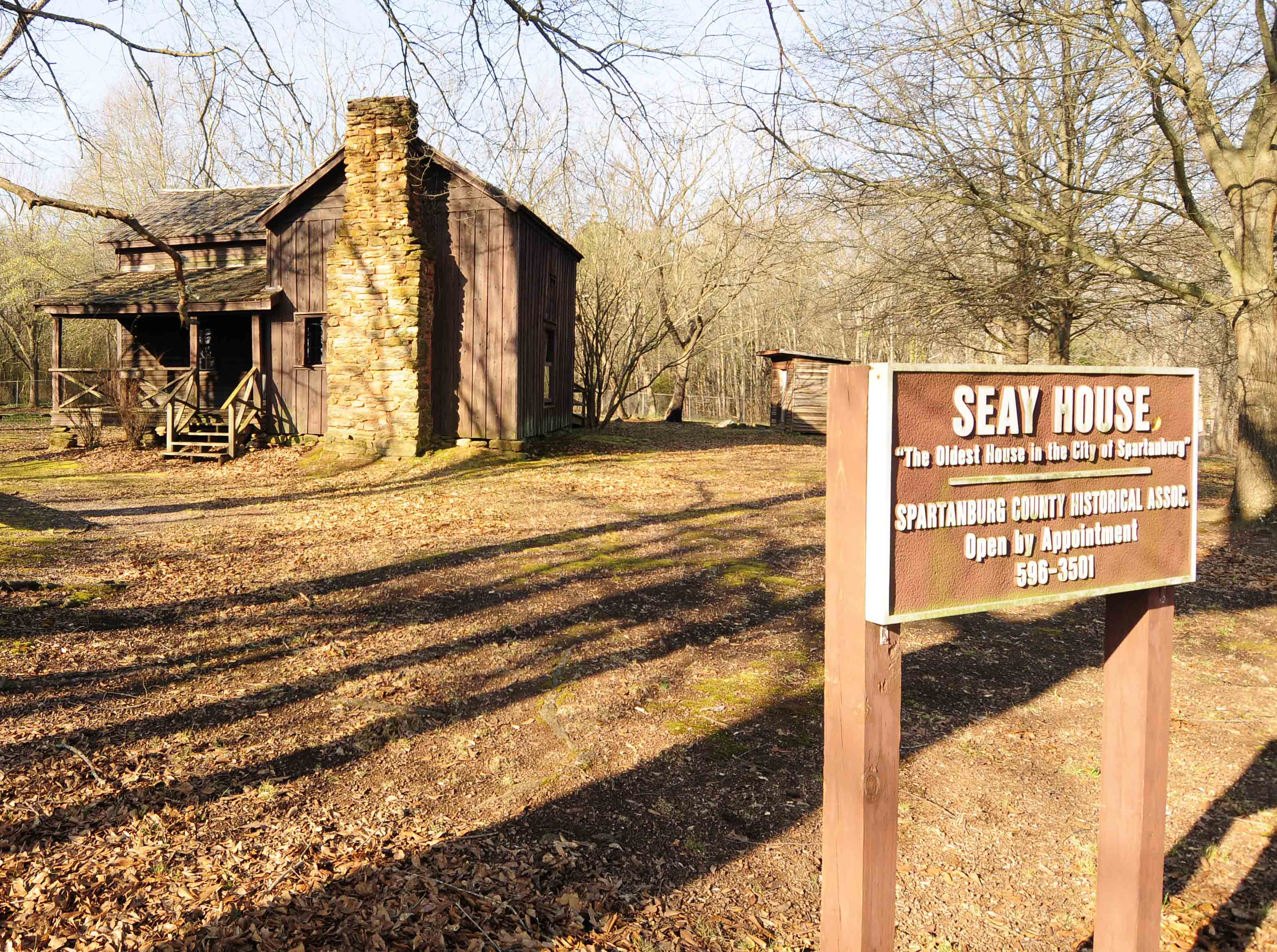
- Jammie Seay House, February 2012

- Location within South Carolina Location within the United States
- Location: Darby Rd. off Crescent Ave., Spartanburg, South Carolina
- Coordinates: 34°55′49″N 81°56′30″W
- Area: 1 acre (0.40 ha)
- Built: c. 1785
- NRHP reference No.: 71000807
- Added to NRHP: October 7, 1971

Jammie Seay House is a historic home located at Spartanburg, Spartanburg County, South Carolina. It was built between 1770–1800, and is one-story, log house with a loft, field stone foundation piers, gabled roof, and an end field stone chimney. It has a one-story "L" rear addition and a one-story lean-to front porch. It was built by Jammie Seay, a Revolutionary War soldier of the Second Virginia Infantry. It is believed to be the oldest house within the present limits of Spartanburg.

It was listed on the National Register of Historic Places in 1971.

The house is owned by the Spartanburg County Historical Association and is open for tours in season.
