= John Allemong =

- Born: January 22, 1801
- Died: August 2, 1872 (aged 71); Frederick County, Virginia

John F. Allemong (January 22, 1801 – August 2, 1872) was a Methodist preacher and businessman in Stephens City, Virginia, near Winchester. He began preaching in 1820. He also ran a store.
