= Frank Grobe =

German politician (born 1967)

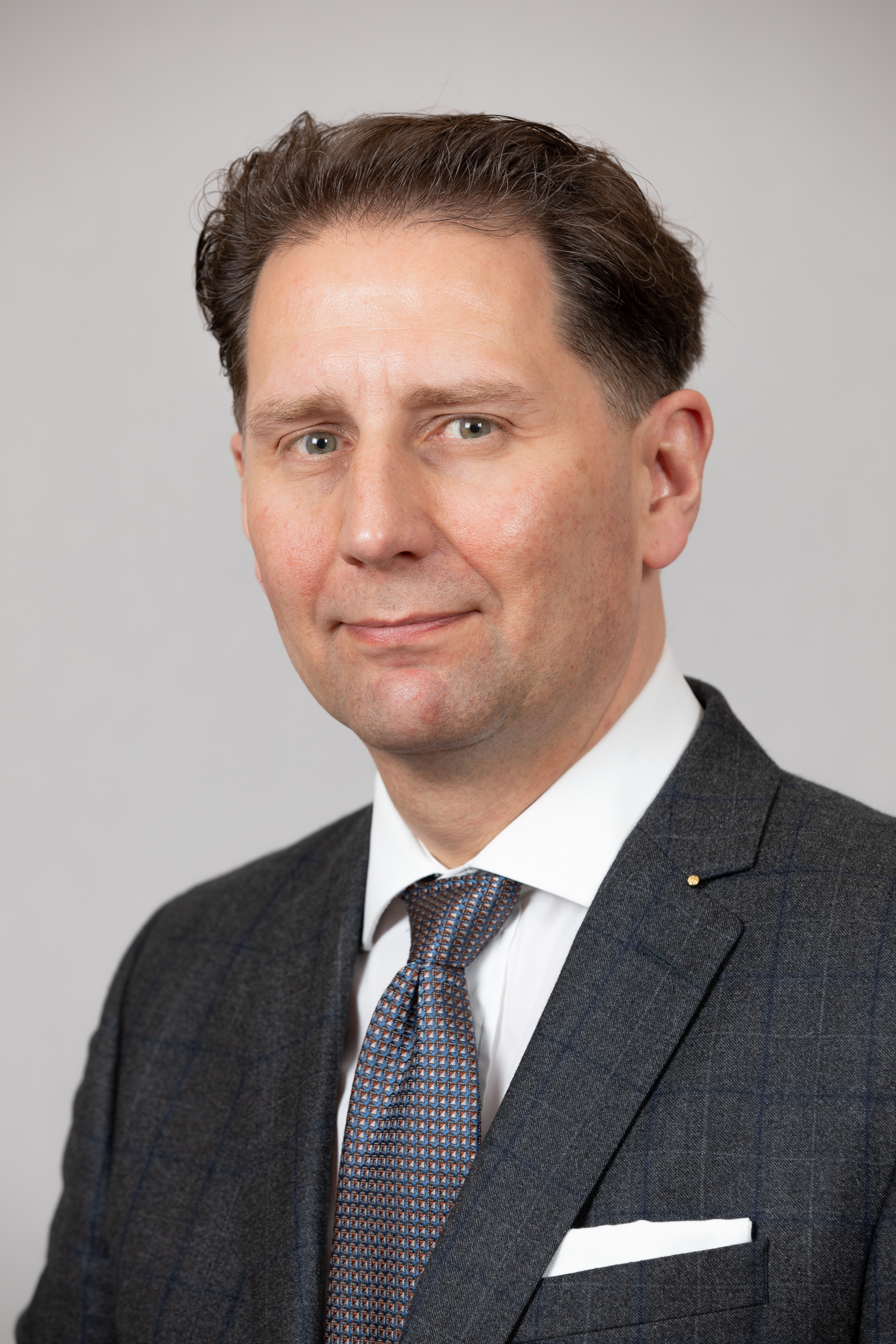
- Grobe in 2019

Member of the Landtag of Hesse
- Incumbent
- Assumed office 18 January 2019

Personal details
- Born: 15 September 1967 (age 58) Dortmund
- Party: Alternative for Germany (since 2013)

Frank Grobe (born 15 September 1967 in Dortmund) is a German politician serving as a member of the Landtag of Hesse since 2019. He has served as chief whip of the Alternative for Germany since 2019.
