= Gassaway Sellman Grimes =

American physician

- Born: November 16, 1816; Maryland, US
- Died: July 3, 1875 (aged 58); Gainesboro, Virginia, US
- Occupation: Physician
- Spouse: Susan Dorsey
- Children: 8

Gassaway Sellman Grimes (November 16, 1816 – July 3, 1875) was a medical doctor who practiced in Maryland for several years. He married Susan Dorsey, a descendant of the Dorsey family.

== Early years ==
Grimes was born on November 16, 1816, in Maryland to Cornelius Grimes, who served in the War of 1812, and Elizabeth Sellman. He was of Scotch-Irish and Welsh descent. He was a descendant of colonel Nicholas Gassaway.

Grimes attended the old Barnesville Academy. Grimes graduated from the University of Maryland School of Medicine in 1838. The subject of his thesis was epidemic catarrh, another term for influenza.

Grimes married Susan H. Dorsey on June 25, 1839, in Frederick County, Maryland, a descendant of Edward Dorsey. By 1840 he moved to Carroll County, Maryland. Grimes was once part of a convention in support of William Henry Harrison for president in the election of 1840. He was a member of the Ridgeville Methodist Episcopal Church.

When his father Cornelius died in 1852, Grimes was living on one of his father's properties, in Ridgeville, which had 70 apple trees.

== City Hotel ==
He was once proprietor of the City Hotel in Frederick, Maryland, with his brother-in-law Basil E. Dorsey. Grimes retired from this position in 1856, leaving Dorsey as sole proprietor.

== Civil War ==
Grimes served for the Confederacy during the American Civil War, and was taken prisoner.

== Personal ==
At the end of the Civil War in 1865, Grimes lived in Watersville, Maryland. Grimes died at his house in Gainesboro. He is buried at Prospect Hill Cemetery in Front Royal.

His daughter Kate married T. M. Turner. His daughter Elizabeth was the mother of sculptor Rudulph Evans. His son Robert Lee was also a physician.
