= William C. Graham (music professor) =

- Born: c. 1817
- Died: October 21, 1866; Staunton, Virginia

William C. Graham (c. 1817 – October 21, 1866) was a music professor from Philadelphia, who taught at Staunton's Deaf Dumb and Blind Institute from 1840 to 1866, replaced by A. J. Turner. Graham was a pupil of the Pennsylvania Institute for the Blind.
