= Charles Grobe =

American composer (c. 1817 – 1879)

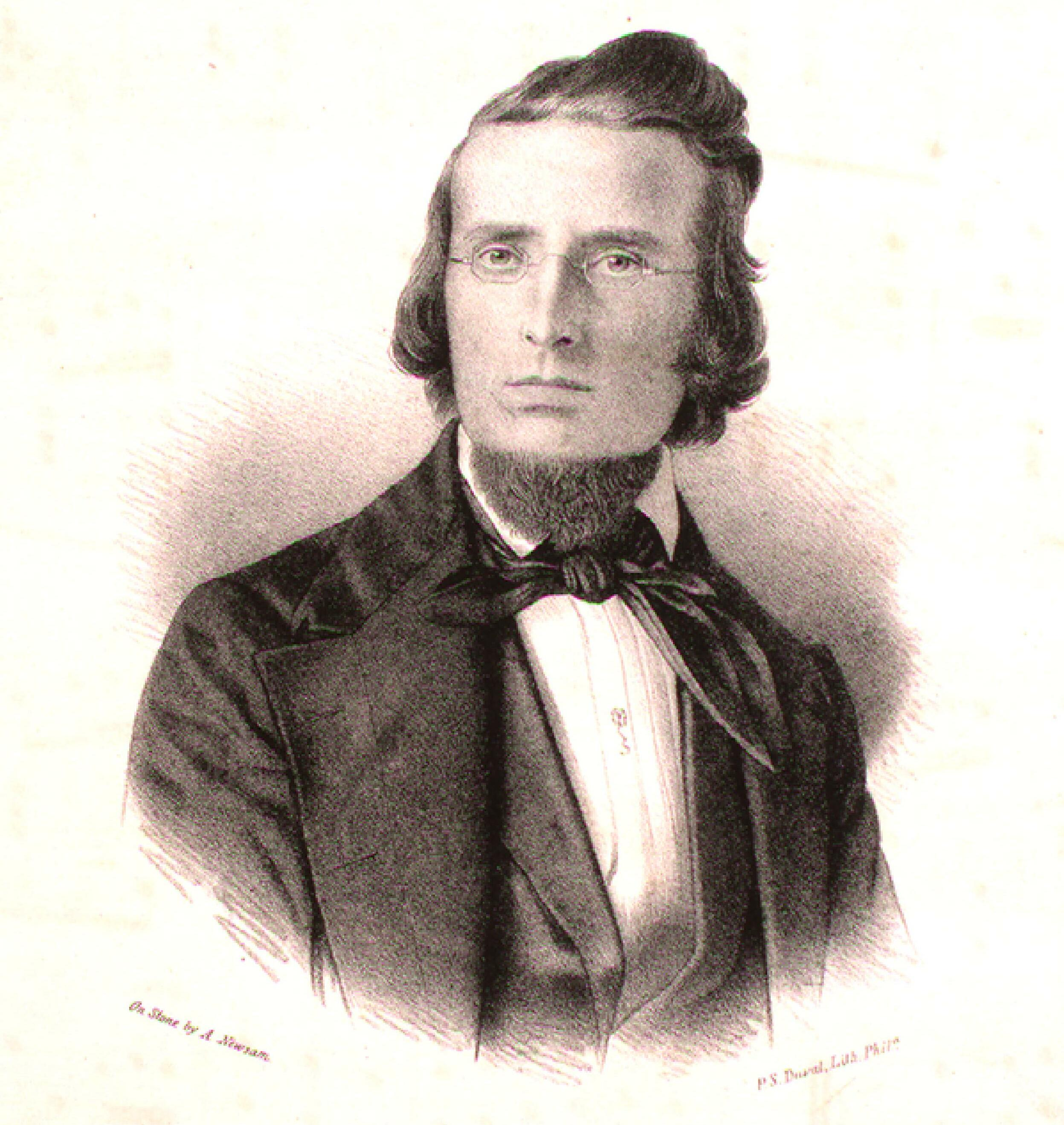
- Born: c. 1817; Weimar, Saxe-Weimar-Eisenach
- Died: October 20, 1879 (aged 61–62); Stroudsburg, Pennsylvania, US
- Occupation: Composer

Charles Grobe (c. 1817 – October 20, 1879) was an American composer who wrote nearly two thousand works, including many piano variations on popular melodies. According to The Grove Dictionary of American Music, he was the most prolific 19th-century composer of battle pieces in the United States, who wrote music for the American Civil War and Mexican–American War.

== Biography ==
Grobe was born in Weimar around 1817, reputedly the son of a Lutheran clergyman, and emigrated to the United States around 1839.

He was employed for most of his life in music education; he served as head of the music department at Wesleyan Female College in Wilmington, Delaware from 1840 to 1861, was the founder of a Musical and Education Agency which he led from 1862 to 1870, and was an instructor at the Pennington Seminary and Female Collegiate Institute from 1870 to 1874 and at the Centenary Collegiate Institute from 1874 to 1879.

== Compositions ==
Grobe characterized his own pieces as "predictable but pleasing piano music". He drew inspiration from accessible musical themes and was frequently inspired by contemporary events. During the Mexican–American War, Grobe composed the "Old Rough and Ready Quickstep" (1846) in honor of Zachary Taylor, and later, "The Battle of Buena Vista" (1847). The latter, a highly descriptive piano fantasy with detailed textual descriptions of American and Mexican military movements, proved popular, and Zachary Taylor himself owned a copy.

Later, during the prelude to the American Civil War, Grobe supported the candidacy and presidency of Abraham Lincoln. He composed the "Lincoln Quickstep" in his honor, the first verse of which begins:

Honest Old Abe has split many a rail;
He is up to his work, and he'll surely not fail.
He has guided his flatboat through many a strait,
And watchful he'll prove at the Helm of the State.

Grobe's battle music drew inspiration from works such as Frantisek Kotzwara's "The Battle of Prague," and in 1860 Grobe published "The Battle of Prague: Revamped, Remodeled, and Renovated." Grobe composed prolifically during the early years of the Civil War, swiftly publishing songs with lengthy captions taken directly from newspaper accounts of recent battles. However, as the war raged on the popularity of Grobe's "descriptive pieces" soon faded, and few were published during the later years of the conflict.

Several of Grobe's compositions featured cover art by the lithographer Albert Newsam. In 1862, Grobe and a number of friends established a fund for the benefit of Newsam, as Newsam had by then been stricken by paralysis and had fallen into poverty.

Grobe's widespread recognition arose in no small part from his extreme productivity, and he assigned progressively higher opus numbers to his works. In 1859, when Grobe headlined a concert at the June meeting of the Board of Trade of the Music Publishers of the United States, he had already published Op. 1000. He continued composing late in life, eventually reaching a reported opus number of 1998.
