= Charles W. Turner (attorney) =

Lawyer in Seattle and Montana

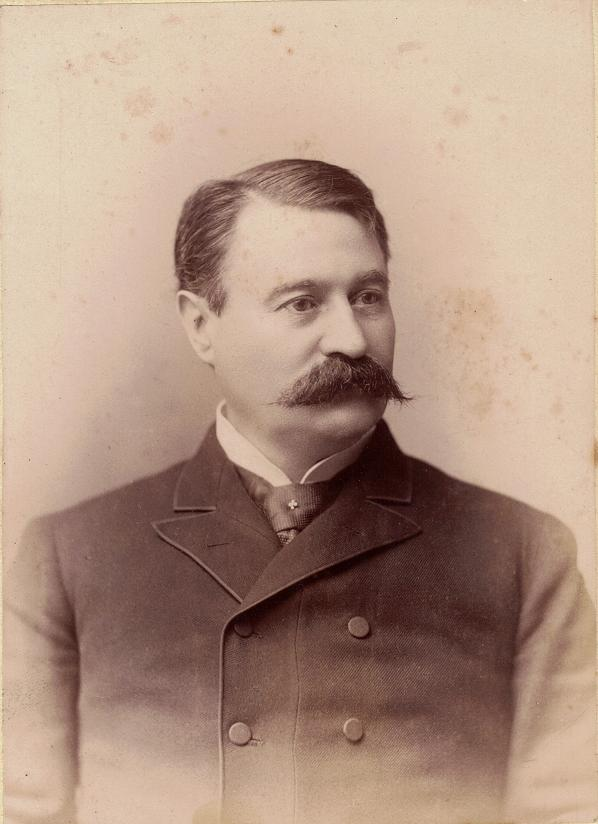
- Born: Charles William Turner; June 8, 1846; Stephens City, Virginia
- Died: January 7, 1907 (aged 60); Seattle, Washington
- Cause of death: Gunshot
- Resting place: Lake View Cemetery
- Education: Virginia Military Institute
- Occupation: Lawyer
- Years active: 1870–1907
- Known for: Adjutant General of Montana; New Market Cadet
- Political party: Democrat
- Spouse: Emma Armstrong
- Children: Armstrong Memory Turner; Charles William Turner, Jr.
- Parent(s): A. J. Turner; Kate Aby

Charles W. Turner
- Military career
- Allegiance: Confederate States of America
- Branch: Confederate States Army
- Service years: 1861, 1864–1865
- Rank: Lieutenant
- Units: 5th Virginia Infantry, Co. L
- Conflicts: American Civil War: Battle of Hoke's Run; First Manassas; Battle of New Market

Charles William Turner (June 8, 1846 – January 7, 1907) was a lawyer in Seattle and Montana, and once Adjutant General of Montana. As a teenager, during the American Civil War, he was a courier for Stonewall Jackson. Subsequently, he was one of the VMI cadets who fought at the Battle of New Market. He later moved to Montana to practice law and engaged in mining pursuits. Turner was shot to death in a Seattle bar by an assassin who was after one of Turner's clients.

== Early years ==
Charles William Turner was born on June 6, 1846, in Stephens City, Virginia, then known as Newtown, to music professor A. J. Turner and Kate Aby. Charles sometimes signed his name Charles William H. Turner, perhaps due to his great-grandfather, Charles W. Hulett, who was a drummer in the Revolutionary War. By the late 1850s the family had moved to Staunton, and A. J. directed the Mountain Sax Horn Band.

=== Civil War ===
Turner gave his services to the Confederacy for the duration of the American Civil War. By the end of the war Turner was commissioned a lieutenant.

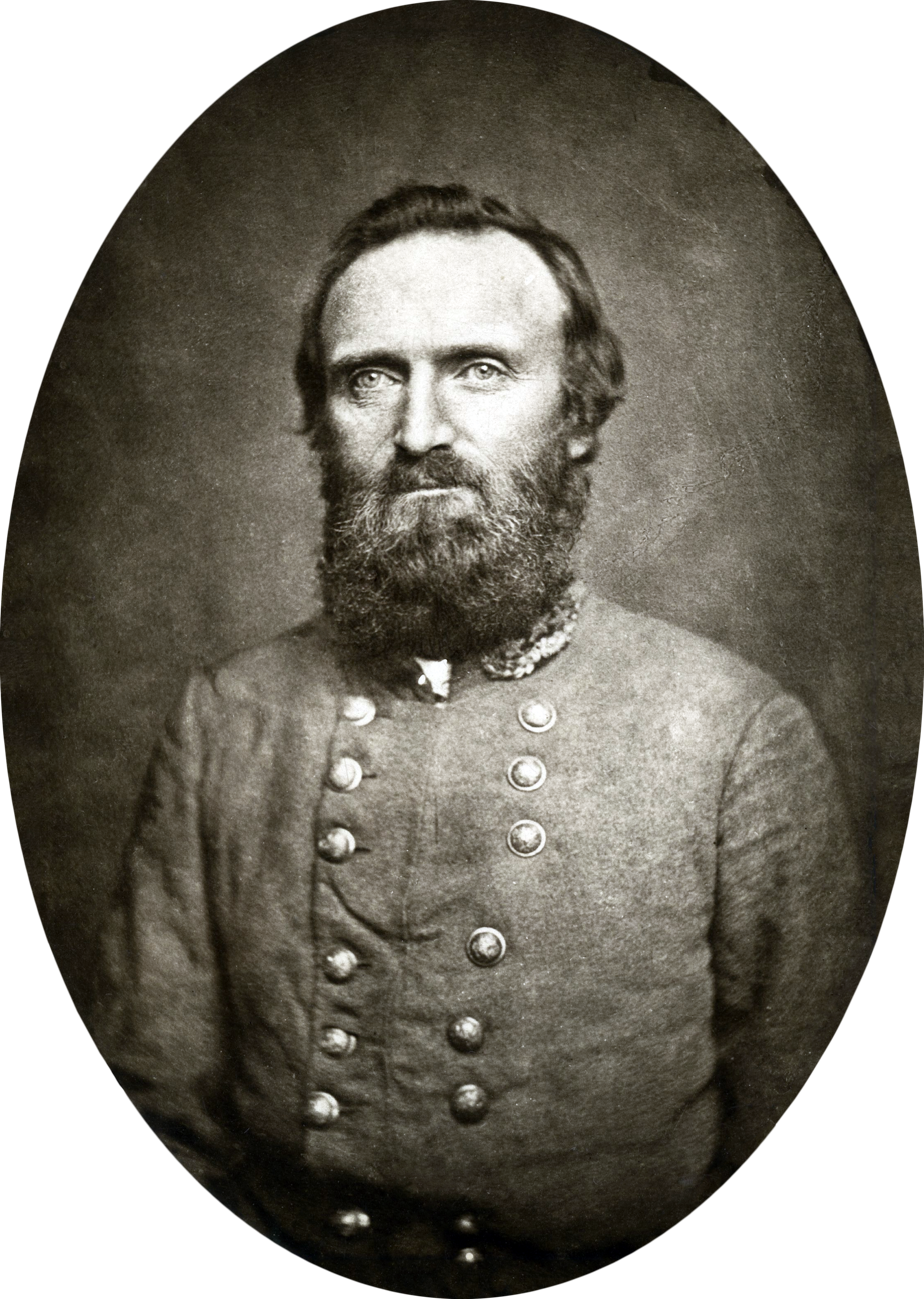
Turner was a courier for Stonewall Jackson (pictured)

==== Stonewall Brigade ====
Turner enlisted on June 9, 1861, in Shepherdstown, and was mustered into the 5th Virginia Infantry, Company L, known as the "West Augusta Guards", part of the Stonewall Brigade of Stonewall Jackson.

Turner ran mail as a courier under Jackson. He was detailed as an orderly to Jackson from July 10 to August 28, 1861, placing him at First Manassas. (Note: His father A. J. and brother Memory were in the marching band of the 5th Infantry in 1862, giving the Mountain Saxhorn Band its name of the Stonewall Brigade Band, which it still retains.)

An account of the Battle of Hoke's Run in the Staunton Spectator reads: "Little Charley Turner, a boy about 15 years of age, insisted so strongly on going with the Augusta Guards that his father finally yielded to his importunities and allowed him to go. The result shows that little Charley went to perform service, for he made one of the enemy bite the dust."

==== VMI ====
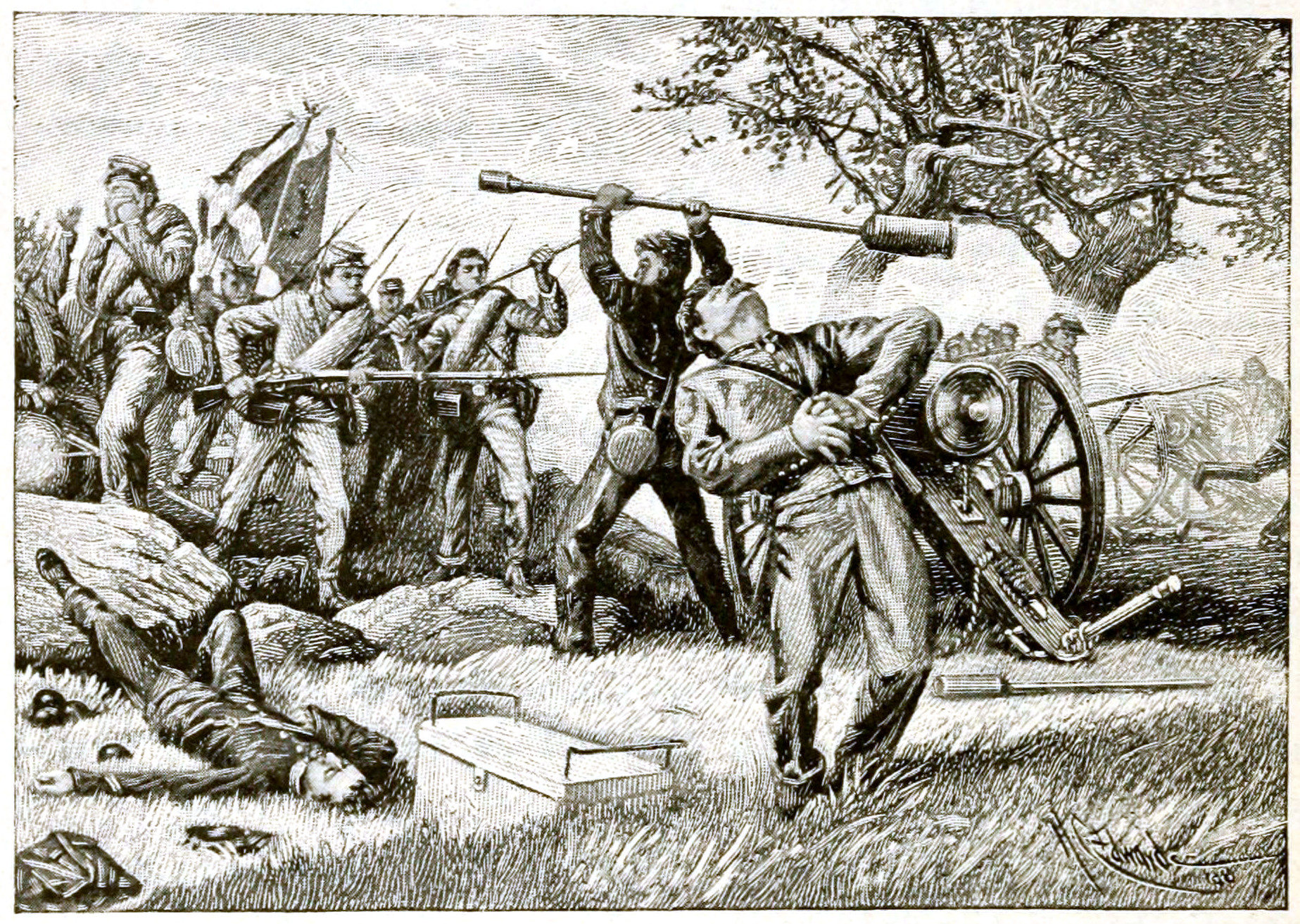
The Cadets at New Market

Turner enrolled at Virginia Military Institute (VMI) on April 15, 1864. He graduated from VMI in 1867. Edward Magruder Tutwiler was a member of the same class.

===== Battle of New Market =====
Soon after he enrolled, Turner was one of the cadets who participated in the Battle of New Market, as a private in Company C. Major General John C. Breckinridge reluctantly ordered the charge of the young cadets to fill a gap in his right wing, resulting in the cadets having taken part in the Confederacy's last major victory of the war. The cadet battalion captured a Union cannon. Turner was listed as "slightly wounded", as was John Sergeant Wise of Company D. Years later, another cadet in Turner's company wrote an account of the events preceding the charge.

The fire was furious at this time. It seemed to me I saw pieces of paper caught up and swept towards us by the currents of air set in motion by the projectiles and the boughs of a large tree immediately in my front were all stretched out and swaying towards us. I believed I was bound to get killed but I did not want to get killed out of ranks, so I made a spurt back to the line and scuttled in behind 2 rails alongside of some fellows.

Whilst lying here with the air literally filled with Yankee missiles, each of which seemed to miss me only by a scant sixteenth of an inch, I noticed the Color Sergeant of a body of troops on our left and rear, jump up, and along with the Color Guard run the front and establish himself upon the prolongation of our line.

In a second a number of his regiment were running to the front and grouping themselves around him. I saw them falling like jackstraws, on their backs, faces, sides and knees. Then the flag, which had been perfectly erect in the centre of the group, dipped almost to the ground, but some one had it up again in a moment. Then the regiment arose with a yell and rushed into line.

Just then some fellow jumped up right near me, and by his voice I knew him to be Evans, our Color Sergeant. He sang out in a powerful, clear voice; "Captain Wise, take command! Col. Shipp has fallen" In the same second I saw Captain H. A. Wise spring to the front with drawn sword (as did Captains Preston and Robinson) and give the order to ride – then, I think, charge.

— Nelson Berkeley Noland,

=== Post war ===
After the war, Turner engaged in mercantile pursuits in his native Staunton as well as Baltimore. While in Baltimore he worked for the firm of Chaney, Randall, and Co. In Staunton he was a merchandise auctioneer with partner W. M. Chewning. There, Turner was also a member of the "Philomathesian Society" (cf. the Philomathean Society).

== Montana ==
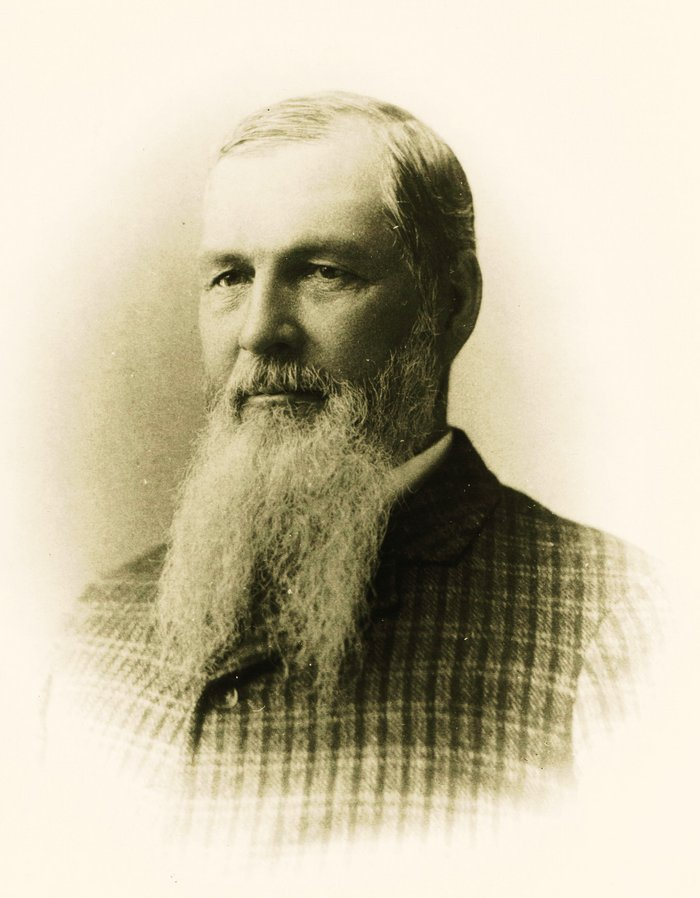
Noah Armstrong (pictured) was Turner's father-in-law.

Near the end of 1869, he moved to Montana, where he was admitted to the bar to practice law. He was in Meagher County by 1870.

=== Mining ===
Turner became interested in mining pursuits due to gold discoveries, and moved to Bannack around 1875. While there, a major washout of his flume resulting in a loss of two years' earnings caused him to return to his law practice.

He also spent time in Virginia City. He was one of the counsel for the territorial officers when the capital of Montana moved from Virginia City to Helena in 1875.

=== Glendale ===
Turner then moved to Glendale, where he served as chairman of the Democratic ratification meeting. A band leading the procession played a medley in front of Turner's "brilliantly lighted residence".

==== Marriage ====
On September 11, 1879, Turner married Emma Armstrong, daughter of Noah Armstrong, in Glendale. They had a child, and Turner's first son, Armstrong Memory Turner, in Glendale on July 25, 1880.

=== Helena ===
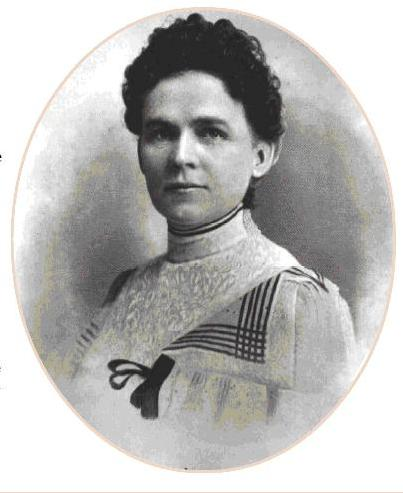
Ella Knowles Haskell (pictured) held the same position as Turner.

Turner lived in Glendale until about 1886 when he sold his mining interests and moved to Helena, where he worked for the law firm of Kinsley & Turner, partnering with Joseph Kinsley. When Turner left he was replaced by Ella Knowles Haskell, the first woman to practice law in Montana.

He was also an active member of the Freemasons. In 1889, the meeting of the stockholders of the Bowling Mining Company met at his house. Another son, Charles Jr., was born on April 20, 1889, in Helena.

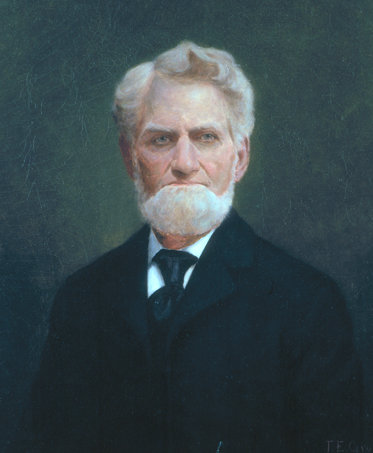
Governor Preston Leslie (pictured) appointed Turner to the position of Adjutant General.

==== Adjutant General ====
Turner was appointed Adjutant General of Montana by Governor Preston Leslie in February 1887. Due to this appointment, the title "General" often precedes Turner's name. He was the first to hold the office since Martin Beem in 1867. The state militia was formed after much action from volunteer companies against Indians. Turner said of the organization:

They are uniformed at individual expense and maintain armories in which they keep their arms and company property and meet for drill, the expense of which is defrayed, in part at least, from the annual appropriation made by the legislature to each company. The infantry and cavalry companies are armed, respectively, with rifles and carbines of the patterns now issued in the army, but some of the infantry companies have neither cartridges boxes nor belts of such patterns and the cavalry are without accoutrements, sabres, pistols, saddles, or bridles except such sabres as they have procured at individual expense . . ."

== Seattle ==
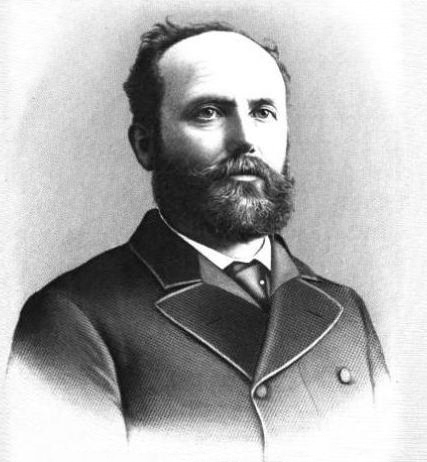
James B. Metcalfe (pictured) was Turner's law partner in Seattle.

Not long after the Great Seattle Fire, Turner moved to Seattle, Washington. Turner practiced law with James B. Metcalfe, the first Attorney General of the state, and Andrew F. Burleigh, with whom he had partnered in Helena. Metcalfe and Turner remained law partners until January 1892. Turner then was part of the law firm of Turner & McCutcheon until the partnership dissolved on January 27, 1894. He then practiced independently, living for many years at the corner of 9th Avenue and Alder St.

=== Assassination ===
On January 7, 1907, Turner was shot to death by one T. W. Emmons in the saloon of Russell & Mix at 1206 First Avenue for alleged wrongs between Emmons and Turner's client Andy T. Russell.

Russell was one of the owners of the saloon. Emmons had invested his only money upon arriving in Seattle in a cigar shop in front of the saloon, and had received notice to vacate the street. Russell was shot in the left shoulder. Turner was shot in the liver and the spine. Upon being struck, Turner ran to the front door and had nearly reached it when he collapsed and died. Russell ran into a nearby hotel before realizing he too was shot. The assassin Emmons then looked at himself in a large mirror and shot himself in the right temple. He left a note for the coroner explaining his motives. It seems Russell was the target of the attack, though the letter makes some reference to "Russell's pussy-cat lawyer".

==== Funeral ====
Turner was buried on January 10 in Seattle's Lake View Cemetery. The services were under the auspices of Seattle Commandery No. 2, Knights Templars, of which he was a member. The funeral was largely attended and the casket containing the remains was banked with floral offerings. The following sir knights acted as pallbearers: J. M. Palmer, J. C. Peterson, E. W. Craven, W. V. Rinehart, R. C. Hassen, and H. A. Raser. The honorary pallbearers were: J. T. Ronald, J. B. Jurey, Andrew Hemrich, J. F. Hale, S. S. Carlisle, P. P. Carroll, and ex-Judge Alfred.
