= Minis (surname) =

Minis is a Jewish surname. It may refer to:

- Abraham Minis (born 1694) (1694–1757), European settler in the colony of Savannah, Georgia
- Abigail Minis (1701–1794), European settler in the colony of Savannah, Georgia
- Philip Minis (1734–1789), American merchant, son of the above
- Isaac Minis (1780–1856), soldier in the War of 1812
- Philip Minis (physician) (1805–1855), American physician
- Abraham Minis (born 1820) (1820–1889), American merchant, son of the above
