= Minis =

Minis may refer to:

- Miniș (disambiguation), the name of several places and rivers in Romania
- Minis (surname), a Jewish surname (with a list of people of this name)

== See also ==
- Mini (disambiguation)
