= Minni =

Minni may be:

- an ethnonym attested in the Hebrew Bible, possibly the Mannaeans
- the Old Norse for "remembrance", see minnisveig

== See also ==
- Mini (disambiguation)
- Minié (disambiguation)
- Minnie (disambiguation)
