= Ghost Stories (2009 TV series) =

- Genre: Paranormal
- Written by: Kelly Hurd; Steve Stern; Mike Stivala; Julie Yuen
- Directed by: Kelly Hurd; Mike Stivala; Julie Yuen
- Presented by: Tim Cashman
- Narrated by: Jay Thomas
- Composers: Firstcom Music; Tom Tierney
- Country of origin: United States
- Original language: English
- No. of seasons: 2
- No. of episodes: 16

Production
- Executive producers: Joe Townley; Michael Yudin
- Producers: Mike Stivala; Kelly Hurd; Robin Keats; Julie Yuen; Tim Cashman
- Editors: Kelly Hurd; Mike Stivala; Julie Yuen
- Camera setup: Multiple-camera
- Running time: 22 minutes

Original release
- Network: Travel Channel
- Release: October 16, 2009 – November 6, 2010

Ghost Stories is an American paranormal television series that premiered on October 16, 2009 on the Travel Channel. The program is produced by MY Tupelo Entertainment. As its title implies, the series features ghost stories. Each episode showcases stories, legends and tales of different reportedly haunted locations in the United States.

== Synopsis ==
The series is narrated by Jay Thomas, a television and film actor best known for his Emmy-award-winning role as Jerry Gold on Murphy Brown and Eddie LeBec on Cheers. Each episode combines historical footage, re-enactments, and interviews with eyewitnesses and local historians to tell ghost stories from personal experiences, encounters and paranormal activity in an allegedly haunted location. These stories also include cold cases or unsolved murder cases where the victims are claimed to come back as a spirit to haunt the living many years later after their death. Every episode ends with narrator Jay Thomas saying, "Nighty night!"

== Syndication ==
The show currently aired on the Travel Channel Saturday nights at 10pm EST. At the beginning of each episode a parental advisory warning was shown.

== Series overview ==
Season	Episodes	Originally aired		DVD and Blu-ray release date	
Season	Episodes	Season premiere	Season finale	Region 1	Region 2
1	4	October 16, 2009	October 23, 2009	September 6, 2011	—N/a
2	12	June 18, 2010	November 6, 2010	September 6, 2011	—N/a

== Episodes ==
=== Season 1 (2009) ===
No. in season	Title	Location	Original release date
1	"Trans-Allegheny"	Trans-Allegheny Lunatic Asylum, Weston, West Virginia, USA	October 16, 2009
The one-hour series premiere tells the tales of Trans-Allegheny Lunatic Asylum, which is reportedly haunted by a little girl named Lilly who is still looking for her mommy after her death. The first half of the episode explores an old abandoned train tunnel called the "Flinderation Tunnel", also in Weston, West Virginia.
2	"Boise Theater"	Egyptian Theater, Boise, Idaho, USA	October 16, 2009
Stories of the Egyptian Theater, which is said to be haunted by its past performers, former stagehands, and theater-goers who like to watch the ghostly performances on stage.
3	"Axe Murder House"	Villisca Axe Murder House, Villisca, Iowa, USA	October 23, 2009
The tale of an unknown axe murderer who massacred an entire family in their home in the summer of 1912 that's claimed to have caused the house to be haunted.
4	"Moundsville Penitentiary"	West Virginia State Penitentiary, Moundsville, West Virginia, USA	October 23, 2009
West Virginia State Penitentiary is claimed to be home to the ghost of William "Red" Snyder, a former inmate who murdered his parents and met a violent death while serving time.

=== Season 2 (2010) ===
No. in season	Title	Location	Original release date
1	"Peter Shields Inn"	Peter Shields Inn, Cape May, New Jersey, USA	June 18, 2010
Season two begins with the tale of an old seaside bed and breakfast named the Peter Shields Inn that's alleged to be haunted by Mr. Shield's son, Earle who accidentally shot himself in the face with his own shotgun during a duck hunting trip on his boat in the summer of 1907.
2	"Elma Sands"	Manhattan Bistro, New York City, New York, USA	June 18, 2010
Elma Sands was a young woman who was murdered by her fiancé when she was pushed down a water well in the winter of 1799. Today, the same well can be found in a New York City restaurant named Manhattan Bistro that is said to be haunted by Emma's ghost.
3	"Fort Mifflin"	Fort Mifflin, Philadelphia, Pennsylvania, USA	June 25, 2010
The "Screaming Lady" - allegedly a ghost upset by the death of her infant son and young daughter - is said to be heard at the oldest fort in America.
4	"USS Hornet"	USS Hornet (CV-12), Alameda, California, USA	June 25, 2010
A World War II naval aircraft carrier is said to be haunted by a rear admiral named J.J. "Jocko" Clark and his ghostly crew.
5	"Sammie Dean"	Town of Jerome, Arizona, USA	July 2, 2010
Sammie Dean was found strangled to death in her apartment by an unknown assailant and her murder has been a cold case ever since.
6	"El Fumador"	The Cuban Club, Ybor City, Florida, USA	July 9, 2010
The Cuban Club is said to be the home to a ghost called El Fumador, a.k.a. "The Smoker" because he always liked to smoke Cuban cigars, killed for skimming club funds.
7	"J.J. Stark"	Moon River Brewing Company, Savannah, Georgia, USA	July 16, 2010
The ghost of James Jones Stark allegedly haunts a building at the Moon River Brewing Company.
8	"Prince Suleymam"	The Sultan's Palace, New Orleans, Louisiana, USA	October 2, 2010
A Turkish man called The Sultan was allegedly found "buried alive" in a courtyard.
9	"Sister Katherine"	Hotel Galvez, Galveston, Texas, USA	October 9, 2010
The ghost of Sister Katherine allegedly haunts the historic Hotel Galvez.
10	"Toni Jo Henry"	Calcasieu Court House, Lake Charles, Louisiana, USA	October 16, 2010
The ghost of Toni Jo Henry allegedly haunts the court house where she was sentenced to death.
11	"Joel Clough"	Burlington County Prison, Mount Holly, New Jersey, USA	October 22, 2010
Joel Clough allegedly haunts the Burlington County Prison death row jail cell in solitary confinement.
12	"Dr. Edwards"	Linda Vista Community Hospital, East Los Angeles, California, USA	October 22, 2010
Dr. Edwards allegedly haunts the Linda Vista Community Hospital.

== See also ==
- Ghost story
- Ghost hunting
- List of ghost films
- List of reportedly haunted locations
- Paranormal television

=== Similar TV programs ===
- Ghost Adventures (also produced by MY Tupelo Entertainment)
- Ghost Hunters
- Ghost Hunters International
- Ghost Lab
- Ghost Stories (1997–98)
- Most Haunted
- Most Terrifying Places in America
- My Ghost Story
- Scariest Places on Earth
