= Abraham Minis =

Abraham Minis may refer to:

- Abraham Minis (born 1694) (1694–1757), European settler in the colony of Savannah, Georgia
- Abraham Minis (born 1820) (1820–1889), American merchant, great-grandson of the above
