= Abigail Minis =

- A portrait of the life of Abigail Minis, including a family portrait, a depiction of the Minis family tavern and her plantation
- Born: August 11, 1701; Germany
- Died: October 11, 1794 (aged 93); Savannah, Georgia, U.S.
- Resting place: Mordecai Sheftall Cemetery, Savannah, Georgia, U.S.
- Occupation: Landowner
- Known for: Rebel support in the Revolutionary War
- Spouse: Abraham Minis (c. 1730–1757; his death)
- Children: 9, including Philip Minis

Abigail Minis (August 11, 1701 – October 11, 1794) was a businesswoman and landowner, prominent in Savannah, Province of Georgia, during the American Revolutionary War. She was a European immigrant, along with her husband, Abraham Minis, to the newly settled colony of Savannah, in 1733. Despite their not knowing if they would be received, General James Oglethorpe, founder of the colony, allowed Minis and her family entry and granted them land.

Her financial support and hospitality to the rebel troops during the war meant she was considered a Revolutionary hero.

Descendants of the Minises have lived in Savannah ever since.

== Life and career ==
Minis, an Ashkenazi Jew of German origin, was born in 1701. She married Abraham Minis, with whom she had two daughters, Leah (born 1726) and Esther (1731), prior to their emigration to colonial America aboard the William and Sarah. Neither Leah nor Esther had any descendants. A third child, Philip, was born in Savannah, the year following their 1733 arrival, becoming the first white male child born in the colony. They went on to have six more children (one of whom died in infancy): daughters Judith, Hannah and Sarah, and sons Minis, Joseph and Samuel. The girls all survived their mother, whereas the sons all died before her.

The Minises arrived in Savannah on July 11, 1733, shortly after General James Oglethorpe. In addition to the Minises and their two children, Abigail's brother-in-law, Simeon, also made the voyage. He had no descendants.

Oglethorpe granted the family land, and Abraham's name appears in the general conveyance of town lots and farms that was implemented in December 1733, which makes it one of the earliest deeds in the colony.

By 1736, Minis had become a merchant shipper, one of the first settlers in Georgia to have commercial interest. He was in partnership with a local man, with the business known as Minis & Salomons. In research published in 1917, they were deemed to be the first merchants doing business in Georgia, for the previously accepted claimants of Harris & Habersham were established in 1749.

While many colonists left Georgia around 1740, after disagreements over the Trustees' policies, the Minis family remained.

Abraham died on January 13, 1757, aged 62 or 63, and left widow Abigail with eight children to raise.

Minis ran multiple businesses after becoming widowed, and she supplied the rebel troops with provisions during the Revolutionary War's siege of Savannah.

She was a slave owner, ran a large plantation, and possessed property in four Georgia counties.

When Savannah fell to the British in December 1778, she was accused as being a supporter of the rebellion. Despite this, British Royal Governor James Wright permitted her safe passage to Charleston, South Carolina, and allowed her to keep her property. Her financial support and hospitality to the rebel troops during the war meant she is now considered a Revolutionary hero.

Before leaving for South Carolina, she brought her friend and fellow patriot Mordecai Sheftall food in prison after he was captured by the British.

Minis returned to Savannah after the war in 1783, and ran a tavern, which she had established twenty years earlier. The tavern, which she ran along with her five spinster daughters, became a site of "elegant entertainments" and "hosted members of the Georgia assembly, judges, the governor's council, wealthy merchants, and other distinguished citizens." It remained in business until 1779. Well into her 80s, she was still purchasing land in coastal Georgia and South Carolina.

Although it cannot be verified that Minis met with George Washington during his stay in Savannah in 1791, when she was in her 91st year, her daughter, Leah, did have an interview with the president.

== Death ==
After surviving her husband by 37 years, Minis died in 1794, in Savannah. She was 93. She is buried in the Mordecai Sheftall Cemetery, a Jewish cemetery in Savannah, and a different cemetery to that of her husband, who is interred in the city's former Bull Street Cemetery. It was located at the northwestern corner of today's Bull Street and Oglethorpe Avenue and is today marked by a memorial.

== Descendants ==
Minis' great-grandson (son of Philip's son Isaac), also named Abraham, built several properties in Savannah in the 19th century. He was "one of Savannah's leading merchants and a citizen of the highest integrity and social influence."

Later Minises were founding members of the Congregation Mickve Israel, the Hibernian Society and the Oglethorpe Club.

In 2015, Florence Minis Slatinsky was interviewed by Georgia Public Broadcasting.
