= Chōshū Domain Shimonoseki Maeda Battery =

Coordinates: 33°58′25.3″N 130°58′14.9″E

Chōshū Domain Shinomoseki Maeda Battery
- 長州藩下関前田台場跡 (Japanese)
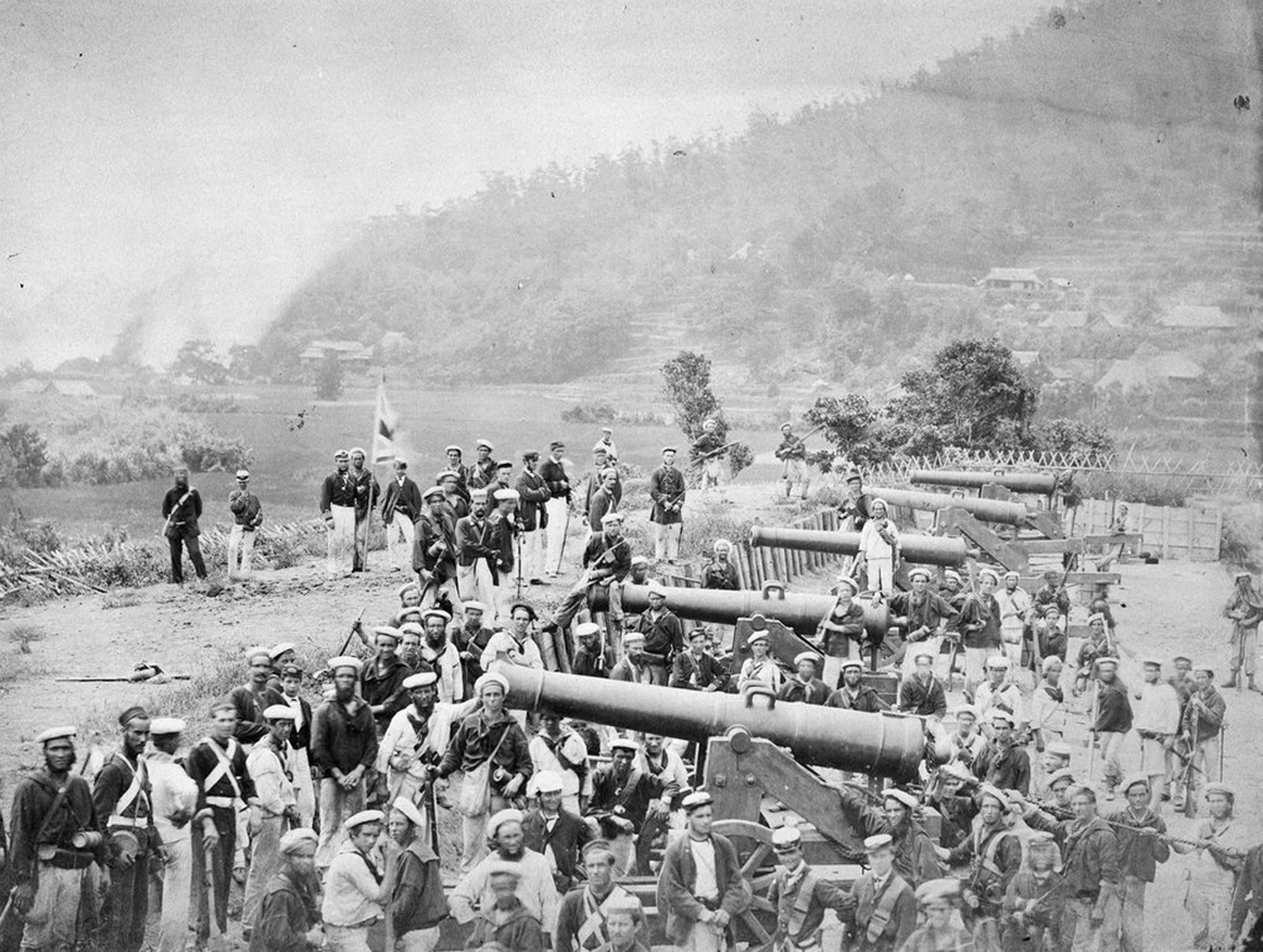
- Maruoka Domain Battery Site

- Location within Yamaguchi Prefecture Location within Japan
- Type: fortification
- Location: Shimonoseki, Yamaguchi, Japan

History
- Built: c.1863
- Demolished: 1864
- National Historic Site of Japan

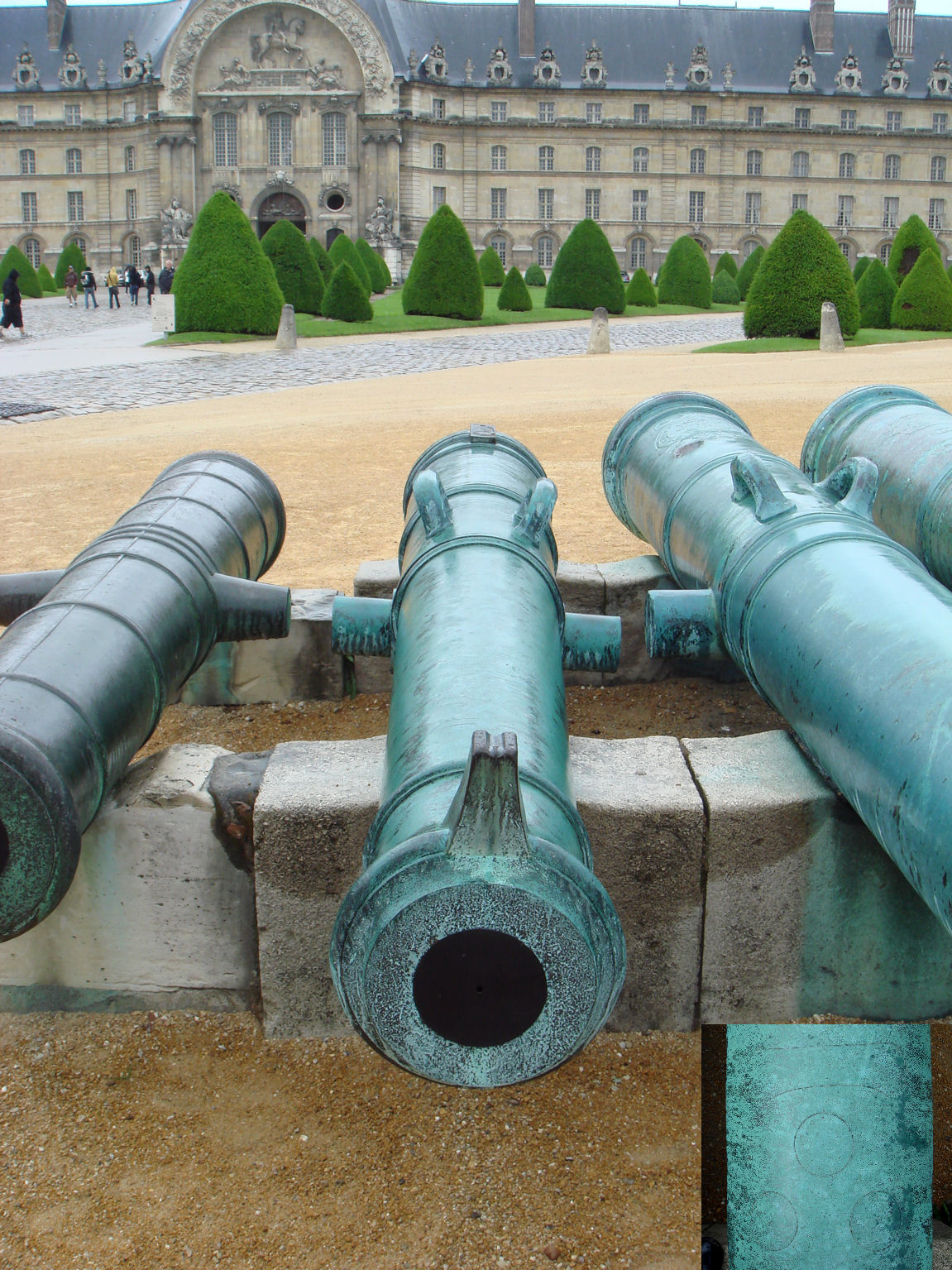
Cannon from the Chōshū Domain Shinomoseki Maeda Battery at the Musée de l'Armée at Les Invalides in Paris

The Chōshū Domain Shinomoseki Maeda Battery (長州藩下関前田台場跡, Chōshū-han Shimonoseki Maeda Daiba-ato) was a Bakumatsu period coastal artillery battery erected by Chōshū Domain in the Kanmon Strait separating the islands of Honshu and Kyushu. It was the site of the Shimonoseki campaign of 1863-1864, when joint naval forces from the United Kingdom, France, the Netherlands, and the United States launched a punitive attack against Chōshū for its attempts to close the Kanmon Strait to foreign vessels. The ruins were designated a National Historic Site in 2010.

== Overview ==
The Maeda Battery was one of more than a dozen coastal fortifications built by the Chōshū Domain, and was located at the southwestern foot of Mount Chausu, facing the Kanmon Strait. This site was once home to the Chōfu Mōri clan's tea house, and ancient roof tiles from the Nara period have been unearthed at the site. The battery is divided into two sections: a low battery on the southwest and a high battery on the northeast. The elevation of the former is about 10 meters, and the latter is about 16 meters. The lower fort already existed during the Chōshū Domain's bombardment in 1863 and was used in the Battle of Shimonoseki Straits. The higher fort did not yet exist at that time (only the lower fort is depicted in the drawings made by the French at the time). In preparation for the attack by the Allied Fleet of the Four Powers the following year, 1864, the lower fort was repaired and the higher fort was hastily constructed.

Archaeological excavations conducted by the Yamaguchi Prefectural Board of Education from 1999 to 2002 confirmed the remains of both the lower and higher forts. At the lower fort, a flat surface was created by excavating the natural ground, and a flat surface for cannon installation, a lower flat surface behind it, and drainage ditches were discovered. The cannon installation surface was about six meters wide from north-to-south. Behind it, a lower flat area is thought to be a work yard. The difference in elevation between this area and the cannon mounting area is about 50 centimeters, and the area extends for over 35 meters from east-to-west. Burnt soil, remnants of the battery's destruction during the Shimonoseki War, can be seen on the flat area behind it.

The drawings of the Maeda Battery created by the British during the Shimonoseki War largely match the current state of the remains. According to the British drawings, the lower battery had five cannons positioned towards the west and one towards the east. The battery measured approximately 80 meters wide and 30 meters deep. Part of the cannon mounting area and the earthen embankment built in front of it were destroyed by road construction, and no longer retain their original form. A photograph of the lower battery taken by war photographer Felix Beato during the Allied Fleet's occupation is included in many history textbooks.

At the higher battery, the cannon mounting area and earthen embankments have been discovered. The flat surface where the cannons were mounted slopes gently to the west, preserving the original terrain. To the west, a burnt earthen embankment has been discovered, measuring approximately 3 meters wide at its base and just under 30 centimeters high. Traces of paving stones and a wooden fence remain on the embankment. The use of the sloping ground, the low height of the embankment, and the use of a wooden fence to supplement its height suggest that the entire elevated fort was hastily constructed. According to British drawings, the elevated fort had four cannons mounted towards the east. The gun battery measured approximately 50 meters wide and 30 meters deep. The cannon mounting surface and the earthen embankment in front of it are well-preserved, but the flat surface behind it has been altered by building construction.

No artifacts related to the gun battery were found at the elevated fort, but three bullets and one cannonball were unearthed at the lower fort. One of the bullets was a spherical Gewehr bullet, mainly used by the Chōshū Domain. The other two were acorn-shaped Minié bullets, mainly used by the Allied Fleet. Of the two types, the Gewehr bullet was older and had inferior accuracy and range compared to the Minié bullet. The cannonball was spherical, 20 centimeters in diameter and weighing just over 21 kilograms, and was of a type used by the Allied Fleet.

The cannons that the Chōshū Domain had used during the Shimonoseki War were taken as spoils of war by the Allied forces. According to British records, 62 cannons were taken, some of which still exist in museums in the four countries involved. Museums that house Chōshū Domain cannons include the Royal Artillery Museum in London, the Musée de l'Armée at Les Invalides in Paris, the Rijksmuseum in Amsterdam and the Marine Corps Museum in Washington, D.C. One of the two cannons in the Musée de l'Armée is on loan to the Shimonoseki Municipal Chōfu Museum.

== See also ==
- List of Historic Sites of Japan (Yamaguchi)
