= Philip Minis =

American merchant

- Born: July 11, 1734; Savannah, Province of Georgia
- Died: March 6, 1789 (aged 54); Savannah, Georgia, U.S.
- Resting place: Mordecai Sheftall Cemetery, Savannah, Georgia, U.S.
- Occupation: merchant
- Spouse: Judith Polock (1774–1789; his death)
- Parent(s): Abraham Minis; Abigail Minis
- Relatives: Bob Minis (great-great-grandson)

Philip Minis (July 11, 1734 – March 6, 1789) was an American Jewish merchant, and the first white male born in the Colony of Georgia. He went on to become paymaster to the Continental Army in Georgia during the American Revolutionary War, in addition to being an advisor to French and continental forces. His name appears in the Journals of the Continental Congress.

Abram "Bob" Minis, a prominent 20th-century figure in Savannah, was a great-great-grandson of Minis.

== Early life and career ==
Minis was born on July 11, 1734, the year following his parents' arrival in the Savannah colony after the Jewish family emigrated from England. The third child of nine of Abraham and Abigail Minis (after sisters Leah and Esther), he was the first white male born in the colony.

He married Judith Polock, of Newport, Rhode Island, on July 20, 1774. They had five children. One of them, Isaac (1780–1856), had a son named Abram, who built several properties in Savannah in the 19th century. He was "one of Savannah's leading merchants and a citizen of the highest integrity and social influence." Abram's brother, Philip, became a noted physician in Savannah. Philip and Judith's other children were daughters Abigail (1775–1835), Frances "Fanny" (1776–1827) and Philippa (or Phillipa) (1789–1865) and son Abraham (1778–1801). Judith was the daughter of Isaac Polock, an early settler of Washington, D.C.

During the Revolutionary War, Minis was paymaster to the Continental troops in Georgia. He advanced $11,000 of his own money to fund their purchase of supplies. He was also an advisor to French and continental forces. His name appears in the Papers of the Continental Congress.

In 1778, Minis left for Charleston, South Carolina, after Savannah was captured by the British. His family remained in Savannah. His wife, an outspoken supporter of the Revolution, was made to work for the British as a domestic servant.

The following year, the Minis women petitioned Governor James Wright and the Royal Council of Georgia for safe passage to join Philip in Charleston. It was granted. The family returned to Savannah after the war.

Also post-war, Minis was named in the 1780 Georgia Disqualifying Act, which declared all persons named in it incapable of ever holding or exercising any office of trust, honor or profit within the limits of Georgia.

On July 7, 1786, he was elected president of the newly reorganized Congregation Mickve Israel.

== Death ==
Minis died on March 6, 1789, aged 54. His obituary in the Georgia Gazette stated he was "an affectionate husband, a dutiful son, tender father and kind brother; in short, he was in every sense of the word a truly honest man."

He is interred in Savannah's Mordecai Sheftall Cemetery alongside his mother. His father is buried in the now-demolished Bull Street Cemetery at the intersection of Bull Street and Oglethorpe Avenue. His wife survived him by 29 years.
