= James Eppinger =

American judge (1790–1871)

Personal details
- Born: April 26, 1790 Savannah, Georgia, U.S.
- Died: October 1, 1871 (aged 81)
- Resting place: Eastview Cemetery, Zebulon, Georgia, U.S.
- Spouse(s): Juliana Throop (m. 1820–1859; her death); Jane Throop (m. 1860)

James Eppinger (April 26, 1790 – October 1, 1871) was Judge of the Inferior Court of Pike County, Georgia, for 28 years. He was also a member of the Georgia Legislature, served in the War of 1812 and won the gold medal as best marksman in the Chatham Artillery.

== Early life ==
Eppinger was born in 1790 in Savannah, Georgia, to German native John P. Eppinger and Hannah Elizabeth Cline. He was the second of their seven known children, born after John and before Sara, William, Edward, Ann and Harriet. The youngest three died in childhood. His grandfather, John, built the first brick structure in Savannah, known as the Eppinger House, which stands at 110 East Oglethorpe Avenue.

== Career ==
In 1835, Eppinger moved from Savannah's Chatham County to Pike County, where he began a 28-year tenure as Judge of the county's Inferior Court. He also worked a farm at their home, located about 8 miles (13 km) outside of Zebulon.

Eppinger served as Marshal of the State of Georgia during the War of 1812.

== Personal life ==
Eppinger married twice: firstly, in 1820, to Juliana Throop, daughter of Colonel William Throop, then to her sister, Jane, in 1860. He had ten children with Julianna prior to her death in 1859. With Jane, he had five known children: Juliana, John, Augusta (died aged 2), Edward "Mont" and Augusta.

He kept journals from 1828 to 1859, including in which were copies of every letter he penend and some of which he received.

== Death ==
Eppinger died in 1871, aged 81. He was interred in Eastview Cemetery, in Zebulon, where both of his wives were also buried.
