= Minny =

Minny may refer to:

- an abbreviation of the US state of Minnesota and/or the city of Minneapolis
- Annelie Minny (born 1986), South African cricketer
- Qischil Minny (born 1987), Indonesian footballer
- Harriet Marian "Minny" Thackeray (1840-1875), first wife of Leslie Stephen and daughter of William Makepeace Thackeray
- a character in the animated films Cars and Cars 2
- Minnesota–Wisconsin League or "Minny" League, a professional minor baseball league from 1909 to 1912

== See also ==
- Mini (disambiguation)
- Minié (disambiguation)
- Minnie (disambiguation)
