= John Eppinger =

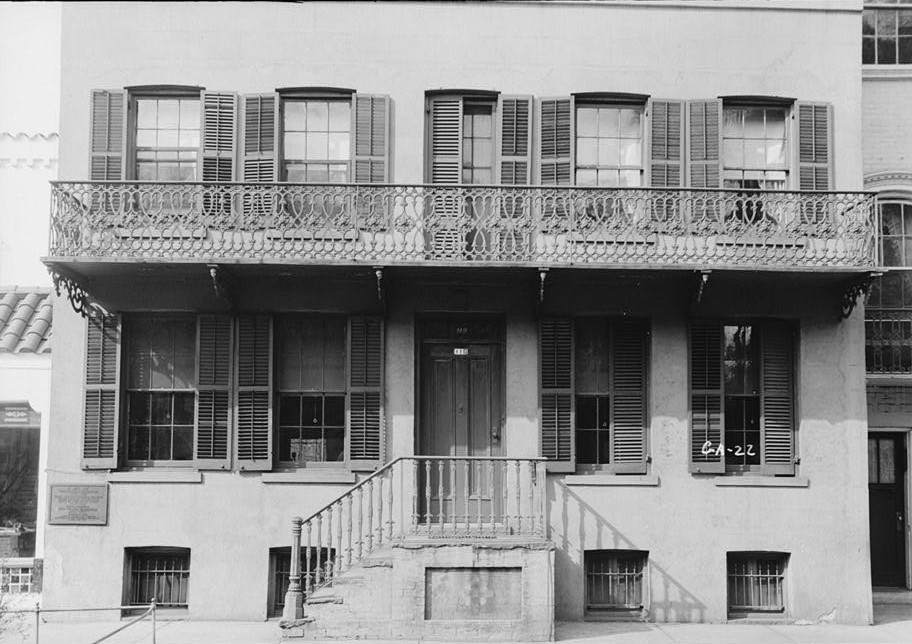
- Eppinger House, mid-19th century
- Born: Johann Eppinger; May 1730; Winnenden, Württemberg, Germany
- Died: 1776 (aged 45 or 46); Savannah, Province of Georgia
- Notable work: Eppinger House

John Eppinger (born Johannes Eppinger; May 1730 – 1776) was a German master builder who was prominent in the 18th century. After arriving in Savannah, Province of Georgia, he became an American Revolutionary War patriot and served in the conflict. Patriotic meetings were held in his home, then known as the Eppinger Tavern. The building is still standing, believed to be the oldest intact brick structure in Georgia.

== Life and career ==
Eppinger was born in the German town of Winnenden, Württemberg, a son of Johann Michael Eppinger, a mason and stone cutter, and Maria Magdalena Kluss. He was baptized as "Johannes Ippinger" on 20 May 1730. He moved to London in 1749, and later that year emigrated to America, arriving on 15 October. He initially settled in North Carolina but moved south to Savannah, Georgia, shortly thereafter.

He married Anna Barbara Mayers, daughter of Jacob Mayers, who was two years his junior. They had eight known children: Margaret, Anna Magdalina, Wenafoothu (Winifred), John, Sarah, James, George and Matthew. John Jr. (1769–1823) became a U.S. district marshall. His son, James, became a judge.

Late in his life, he built the building, now known as the Eppinger House, at today's 110 East Oglethorpe Avenue in Savannah.

=== Death ===
Eppinger died in 1776. His wife survived him by 36 years. She is interred in Savannah's Colonial Park Cemetery.
