= Mini (disambiguation) =

The Mini is a small economy car made by the British Motor Corporation (BMC) and its successors from 1959 to 2000.

Mini may also refer to:

== Vehicles ==
- Mini (marque), an English automotive marque, subsidiary of German carmaker BMW, successor of the original Mini
- Innocenti Mini, an Italian version of the original Mini produced by Leyland Innocenti
- Mini Hatch, a Mini model built by BMW from 2001 to present
- Mini Moke, a vehicle similar to a beach buggy, based on the Mini car
- Mini chopper, scaled-down custom-built versions of chopper motorcycles
- Moulton Mini, a bicycle by Moulton Bicycle

== People ==
- Mini (singer), Japanese model and singer
- Mini Das, Indian and American image processing researcher
- Mini Jakobsen, former Norwegian footballer
- Clarence Mini (1951–2020), South African doctor, anti-apartheid activist, freedom fighter, human rights activist
- Vuyisile Mini (1920–1964), South African anti-apartheid activist
- Anthony Minichiello, Australian rugby league player
- Gabriele Minì, Italian racing driver

=== Fictional characters ===
- Mini Yaemori, a character in Manga and Anime series Rent-a-girlfriend
- Mini McGuinness, a character in Skins

== Film ==
- Mini (documentary), a 1975 British documentary
- Mini (1995 film), a Malayalam film
- Mini (2022 film), a Bengali film

== Technology ==
- Minicomputer, a class of special multi-user computers
- iPod Mini, portable MP3 player from Apple Inc., predecessor to the iPod nano
- Mac Mini, an ultra-compact Apple Macintosh computer case
- iPad Mini, a compact version of the iPad tablet
- PlayStation minis, a range of mini games developed for Sony consoles
- Google Home Mini/Nest Mini
- HomePod Mini
- Wii Mini
- DJI Mini, a Chinese camera drone

== Other uses ==
- Mini (EP), an EP by The Wedding Present
- Mini (frog), a genus endemic to Madagascar
- Miniature model (gaming), a small-scale figure in miniature wargames, role-playing games, and dioramas
- Mobile Mini (NASDAQ stock symbol MINI), an American portable storage company
- Ruger Mini-14, Mini-30, or Mini-6.8 carbines
- Minigun
- Mini-international Neuropsychiatric Interview, a short structured clinical interview
- Mini Brands, an American toy brand
- TV3 Mini, a Latvian television channel

== See also ==
- Maxi (disambiguation)
- MIDI (disambiguation)
- Miniature (disambiguation)
- Minicar (disambiguation)
- Minié (disambiguation)
- Miniș (disambiguation)
- Minnie (disambiguation)
- Minny (disambiguation)
- Supermini (disambiguation)
