= Minnie (disambiguation) =

Minnie is a feminine given name and a nickname for both men and women.

Minnie may also refer to:

== Places ==
=== United States ===
- A shortened form of the state Minnesota or the city Minneapolis
- Minnie, Kentucky, an unincorporated community
- Minnie, West Virginia, an unincorporated community
- Minnie Township, Beltrami County, Minnesota
- Minnie Island, Connecticut - see Minnie Island State Park
- Minnie Island, Montgomery County, Maryland - see List of islands of Maryland

=== Canada ===
- Minnie Island, near Stephens Island (British Columbia)

== Arts and entertainment ==
- Minnie (album), by Minnie Riperton
- Minnie (film), a 1923 silent film
- Minnie Mouse, a fictional cartoon character created by The Walt Disney Company

== People ==
- Minnie F. Abrams (1859-1912), American missionary
- Minnie Driver (born 1970), English actress
- Minnie Hartness (1867–1957), American stenographer, writer, lecturer and lady of letters
- Minnie Miñoso (1923–2015), Cuban baseball player
- Minnie E. Neal (1858–1945), American photographer and temperance leader
- Minnie Pearl (1912-1996), stage name of American country comedian Sarah Colley
- Minnie Riperton (1947–1979), American singer-songwriter
- Minnie Gow Walsworth (1859-1947), American poet
- Derick Minnie (born 1986), South African rugby union player
- Memphis Minnie (1897-1973), American blues guitarist, vocalist and songwriter
- Minnie (singer) (born 1997), Thai singer Minnie Nicha Yontararak of K-pop group (G)I-dle

== Other uses ==
- Minenwerfer, a World War I weapon nicknamed "Minnie"

== See also ==
- Mini (disambiguation)
- Minié (disambiguation)
- Minny (disambiguation)
