= Mordecai Sheftall Cemetery =

Old Jewish cemetery in Savannah, Georgia

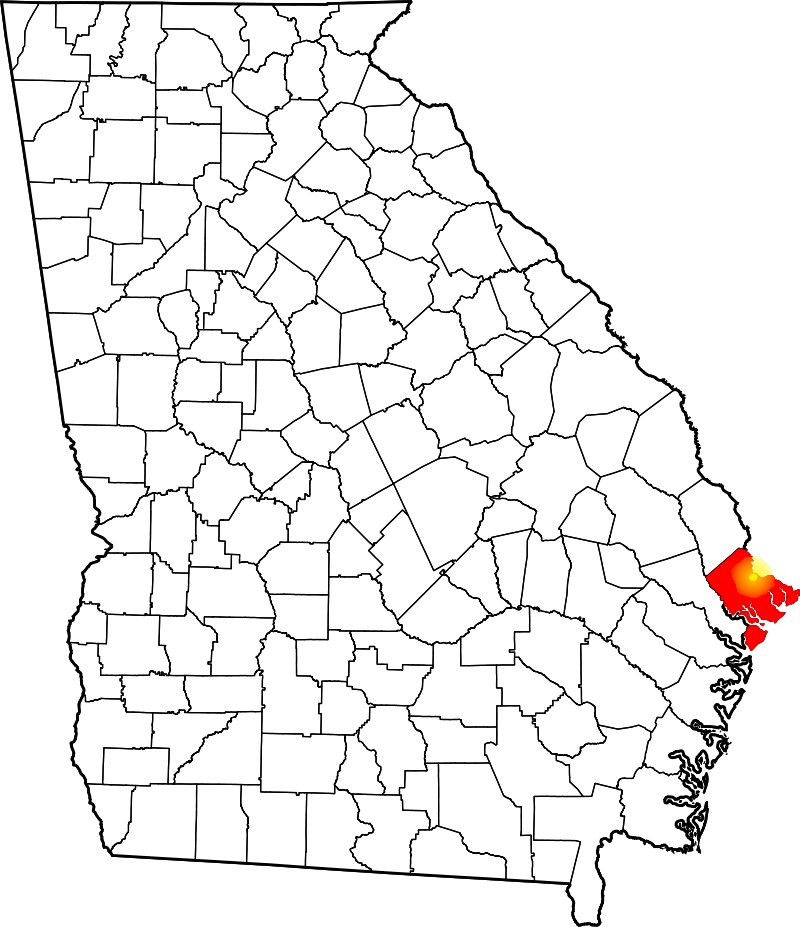
- Map of Georgia, highlighting Chatham County, with a dot showing where the cemetery is located in the county.
- Interactive map of Mordecai Sheftall Cemetery

Details
- Established: August 2, 1773 (or as early as 1769)
- Closed: approximately 1881
- Location: Savannah, Georgia
- Country: United States
- Coordinates: 32°04′20.07″N 81°06′12.05″W
- Type: Jewish
- No. of graves: approximately 84

The Mordecai Sheftall Cemetery is a Jewish cemetery in Savannah, Georgia. It is one of the oldest Jewish cemeteries in America. Located at the end of Coyle Street (a small turnoff of Cohen Street) in the Kayton/Frazier area of West Savannah, it is sometimes referred to as the Old Jewish Burial Ground, the Jewish Cemetery Memorial, the Jewish Community Cemetery or the Sheftall Cemetery.

On November 3, 1761, George III "conveyed a certain half lot of land in Holland Tything, Percival Ward, to David Truan." This land was at the northwest corner of today's Bull Street and Oglethorpe Avenue. Several Jews were interred here before the family cemeteries were established. A memorial, in the Oglethorpe Avenue median, marks the burial ground (known as Bull Street Cemetery) today, with a plaque stating: "Original 1733 burial plot allotted by James Edward Oglethorpe to the Savannah Jewish Community".

== History ==
The founding date of the Mordecai Sheftall Cemetery is disputed; some sources claim that it was established in 1769. The cemetery was founded by Mordecai Sheftall, a leader in the Savannah Jewish community, on 1.5 acres of a 5-acre tract of land granted to him and nine other trustees by King George III to be used as a Jewish cemetery and a synagogue.

The cemetery was in use until the late nineteenth century, or a little over one hundred years. Today, it is still maintained by Mordecai Sheftall's trust. It is situated near the Levi Sheftall Family Cemetery, where much of the Sheftall, de Lyon and De La Motta families are buried.

== Notable burials ==
- Mordecai Sheftall, founder of the cemetery and highest-ranking Jewish Officer in the American Revolutionary War.
- Abigail Minis, patriot
- Philip Minis, merchant
