= Eppinger House =

Historic house in Savannah, Georgia

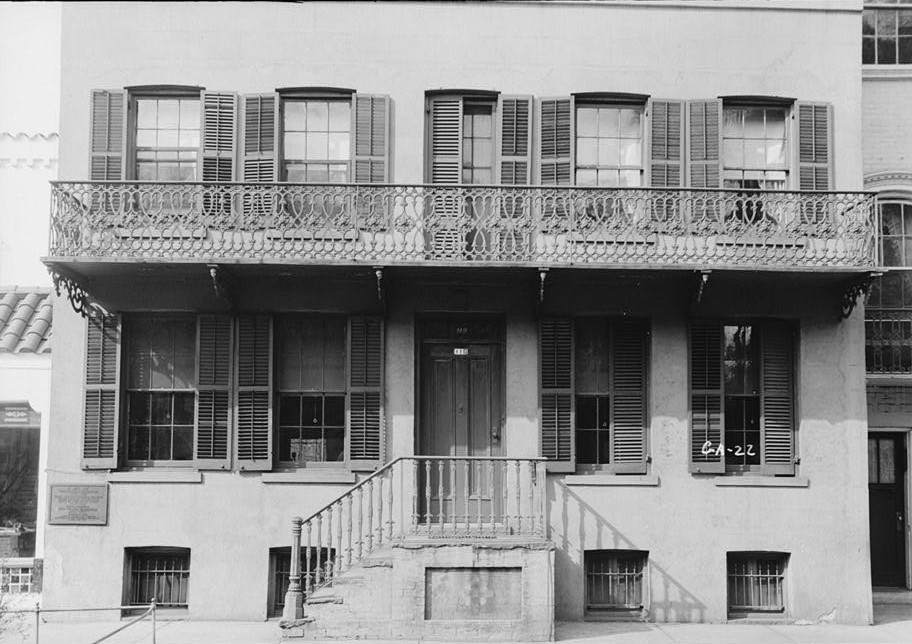
- The building in the mid-20th century
- Interactive map of the Eppinger House area
- Former names: Eppinger's Tavern; Eppinger's Inn; McIntosh House

General information
- Location: Savannah, Georgia, U.S., 110 East Oglethorpe Avenue
- Coordinates: 32.0767645°N 81.09121°W
- Completed: In or before 1776 (250 years ago)

Technical details
- Floor count: 3

Design and construction
- Main contractor: John Eppinger Sr.

The Eppinger House is a building located at 110 East Oglethorpe Avenue in Savannah, Georgia, United States. It is believed to be the oldest intact brick structure in Georgia, dating to or before 1776. In a survey for Historic Savannah Foundation, Mary Lane Morrison found the building to be of significant status. Originally two storeys, built by John Eppinger Sr., its upper level was added in 1876.

The building was known as Eppinger's Inn, owned by a son of John Eppinger, in its early life, and was a popular meeting place for Colonial statesmen. Revolutionary patriots closed it due to the owner's Tory support.

In January 1784, after the British had left Savannah, the Georgia Legislature held its first meeting in the second-floor Long Room.

It was once believed that the home later became that of American Revolutionary War brigadier general Lachlan McIntosh but more recent studies dispute this.

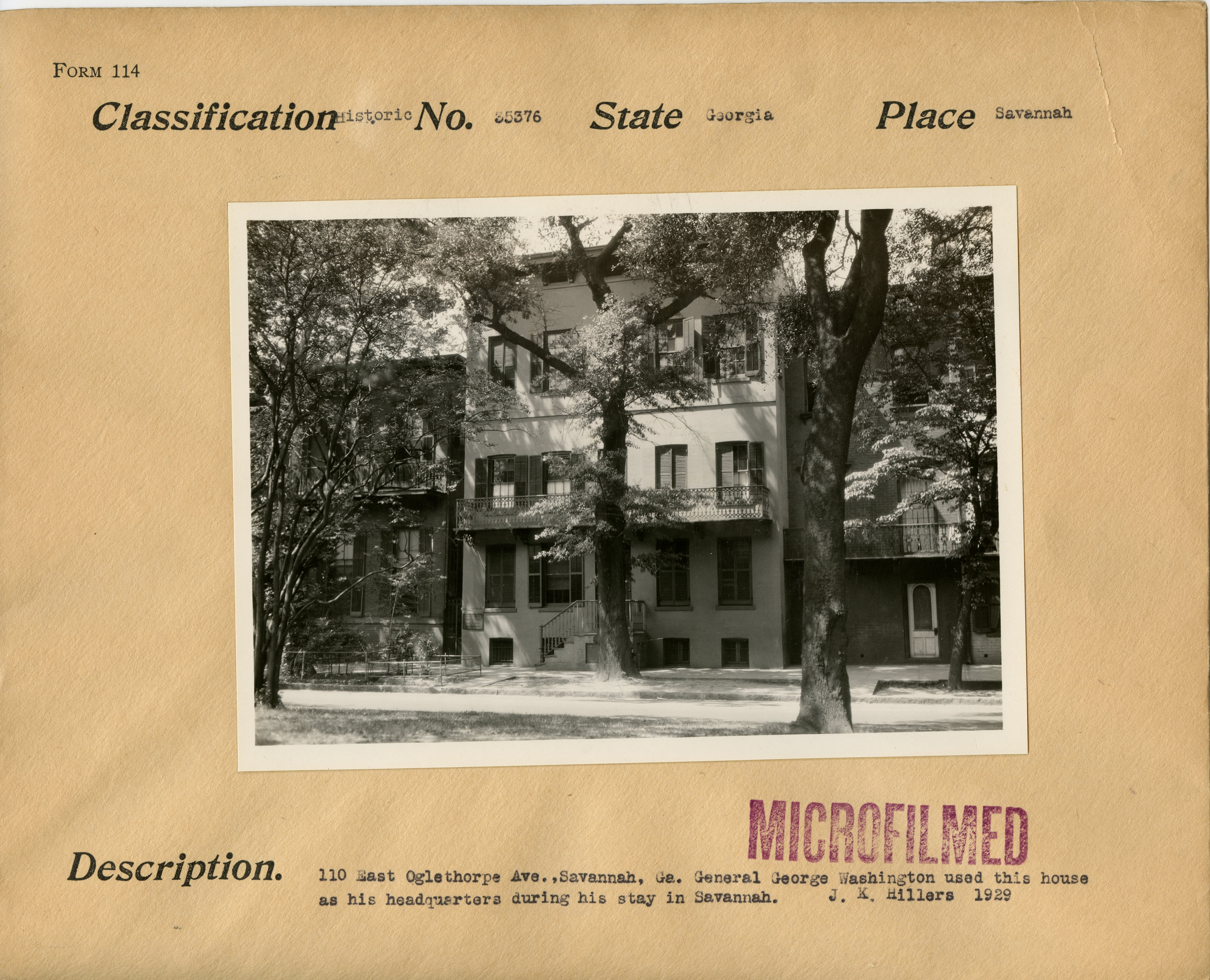
Pictured in 1929

== See also ==
- Buildings in Savannah Historic District
