= Bob Minis =

American businessman

- Born: Abram Minis; November 6, 1903; Savannah, Georgia, United States
- Died: June 29, 1998 (aged 94); Savannah, Georgia, U.S.
- Resting place: Laurel Grove Cemetery, Savannah, Georgia, U.S.
- Occupation: Businessman
- Spouse: Florence Rebecca Powell (m. 1941–1971; her death)
- Relatives: Philip Minis (great-great-grandfather)

Abram "Bob" Minis (November 6, 1903 – June 29, 1998) was an American businessman from Savannah, Georgia, United States.

== Early life ==
Minis was born in 1903 in Savannah, Georgia, as a great-great-grandson of Philip Minis, the first white male born in the colony of Savannah, Province of Georgia.

He graduated Harvard Business School in 1928.

== Career ==
Minis established Minis and Company, an investment advising firm, and Carson Inc. After his retirement from Carson, which was founded in 1951, around 1978, his children became involved in the business up until its sale in 1995. Minis and Company, founded in 1932, became a wholly owned subsidiary of The Savannah Bancorp in 2006 and of SouthState Bank in 2012.

== Personal life ==
Minis married Florence Rebecca Powell in 1941. They had three children: Marguerite (Peggy), Richard and Henry. In 1976, five years after her death, Florence's family donated her collection of books to the Georgia Historical Society and established the Florence Powell Minis Fund in her honor.

After retirement, Minis bought a home in Wilmington Island, Georgia.

He was a member of the Mises Institute.

== Death ==
Minis died in 1998, aged 94. He had survived his wife by 27 years, and was interred beside her in Savannah's Laurel Grove Cemetery.
