= Stark–Minis duel =

1832 duel in Savannah, Georgia

After a series of verbal insults and a formal challenge, Philip Minis shot and killed James Stark in the former City Hotel, Savannah, Georgia, on August 10, 1832.

== The principals ==
Born in 1805, Philip Minis was a physician and scion of an old Savannah family. James Jones Stark was a resident of Glynn County and member of the Georgia state legislature.

The friction between Stark and Minis dated at least to the spring of 1832. According to Richard D. Arnold, a friend of Minis's, Stark insulted the absent Minis in Luddington's barroom, calling him a "damned Jew" who "ought to be pissed upon" and so forth. He declined to repeat the insults in Minis's presence and offered a private explanation deemed acceptable by a friend of Minis. According to Minis's sister Sarah, Stark made anti-Semitic comments directly to Minis in April but offered an apology.

In July, Stark denied having apologized for his comments. Minis then wrote to demand an apology or satisfaction, and Stark agreed to the duel.

== The duel ==
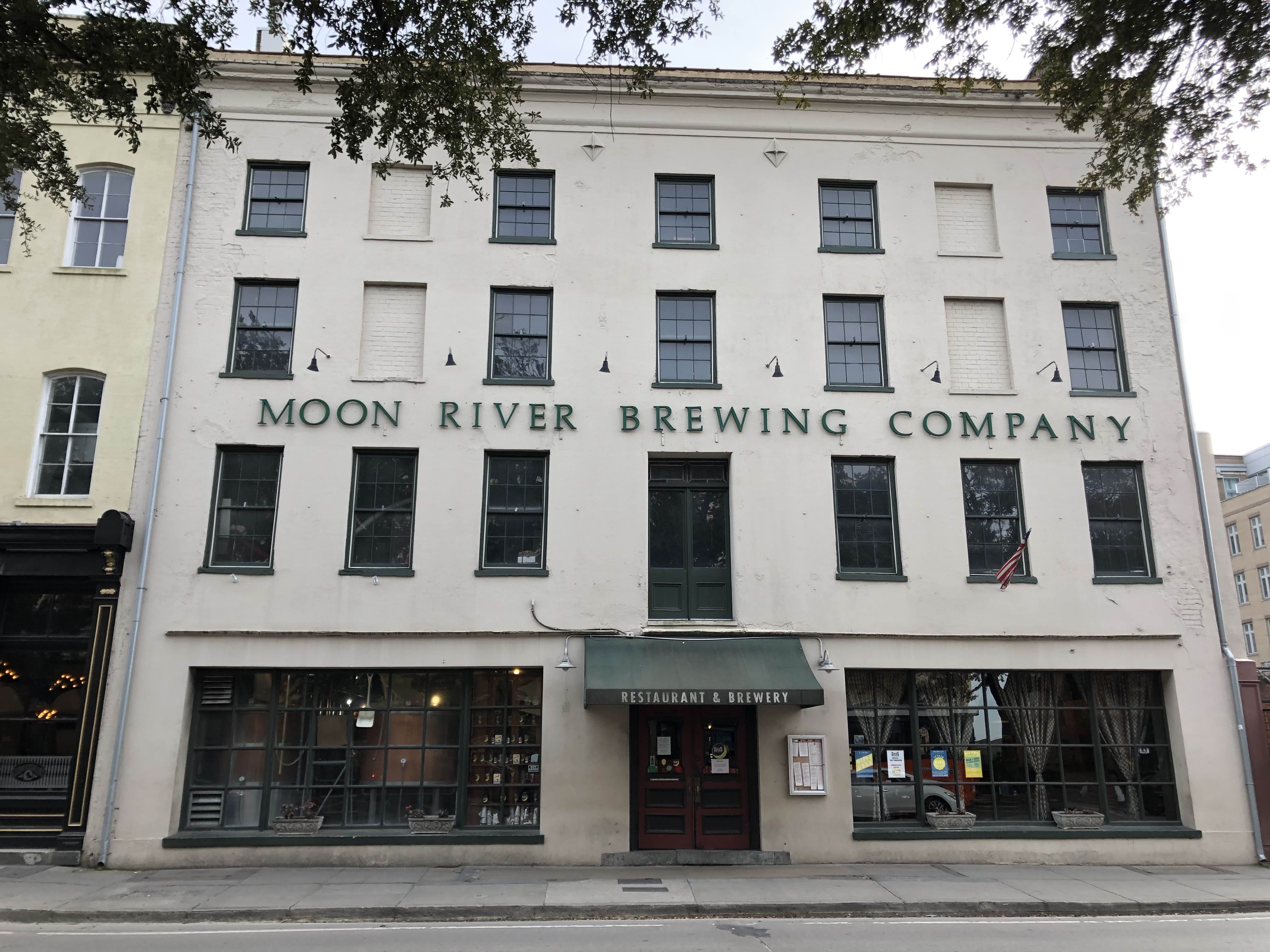
The former City Hotel in Savannah, Georgia

On August 9, the seconds (Thomas Wayne for Stark and Charles Spalding for Minis) began their negotiations. Spalding did not agree to Wayne's proposal of rifles at Scriven's Ferry, South Carolina later in the afternoon. He objected that Minis's rifle (an unusual choice of weapon) was being repaired, and that the duel should be delayed at least until the following day. Stark and Wayne nonetheless crossed the river to Scriven's Ferry, discharged rifles, and declared victory. Their belligerence during a meeting on the street, coupled with rumors of Minis's cowardice, ensured the affair would not rest.

On August 10, Minis and Spalding went to the barroom of the City Hotel; when informed of their presence, Stark and Wayne came downstairs. Minis called Stark a coward. Stark may have produced or reached for a pistol (accounts varied) and Minis shot him through the chest, killing him. Minis's friends persuaded him to relinquish his weapon to Spalding (though not before he threatened to fire into the crowd) and withdraw to his office to await the sheriff, who arrived within the hour. The coroner's inquest returned a verdict of deliberate murder.

== The trial ==
Minis's trial was delayed until a disinterested judge could be found; both principals had connections to the judiciary. Minis's father, Isaac, was a judge on the inferior court and Superior Court Judge William Law was related to Stark by marriage. Law's impartiality may have been questioned for other reasons: he was a member of the Anti-Duelling Association and had suggested potentially prejudicial wording for a notice in the Georgian to which editor Richard D. Arnold objected. Judge Charles Dougherty was imported from the Western Circuit to preside over the trial in January 1833. It lasted six days, and after deliberating for two hours the jury returned a verdict of "Not Guilty."

Though many had initially believed Minis guilty, public animosity apparently did not survive the acquittal. He rose to the rank of major in the Army and enjoyed a successful career as a physician and businessman.

== Social context: anti-duelling and temperance movements ==
The frequency of duels spurred the creation of the Savannah Anti-Duelling Association in 1826. Its goals were general education (furthered by meetings, publications, and essay contests) and practical intervention. The Association drafted letters to the seconds of Stark and Minis, offering arbitration. Southern society was unprepared to relinquish the duel, and the Association became inactive by 1837. The following year, former South Carolina governor John Lyde Wilson set forth rules governing dueling in The Code of Honor, a native alternative to the Irish Code Duello of 1777. Duelists continued to fight in Savannah for decades, with the last fatality recorded in 1870.

Wilson's Code acknowledged that intoxication could lower inhibitions; it was thus "not a full excuse for insult, but it will greatly palliate." Barrooms featured prominently in the Stark-Minis case. Alcohol-related violence among the concerns of the Savannah Temperance Society, founded shortly after Minis's trial. One of the Society's founders, William R. Waring, was motivated in part by the shooting at the City Hotel. He had been among those who disarmed Minis.

== Mythology ==
The building where Stark died is allegedly haunted, with phantom shoves, the crack of a pistol, and ghostly figures having been reported. Like other Savannah locations, the pub now occupying the City Hotel capitalizes upon tourist interest in the supernatural.

== See also ==
- List of duels in the United States
