= Small car =

Small car may refer to:

- Microcar, a term often used for the smallest size of cars, often with an engine smaller than 700 cc
- A-segment, or city car, the smallest category in the European passenger car classification system
- B-segment, the second smallest of the European segments, also variously known as subcompact, A0-class, and supermini
- Subcompact car, an American classification for cars smaller than compact car, equivalent to the B-segment
- C-segment, the third category of the European segments, described as medium cars
- Compact car, North American classification between subcompact and mid-size, and Japanese small size passenger vehicles
- Kei car, the Japanese vehicle category for the smallest highway-legal passenger cars, known variously as light car, Japanese city car, or Japanese microcar

== See also ==
- Minicar (disambiguation)
- Euro Car Segment
