= Christian Camphor Cottage =

Historic house in Savannah, Georgia

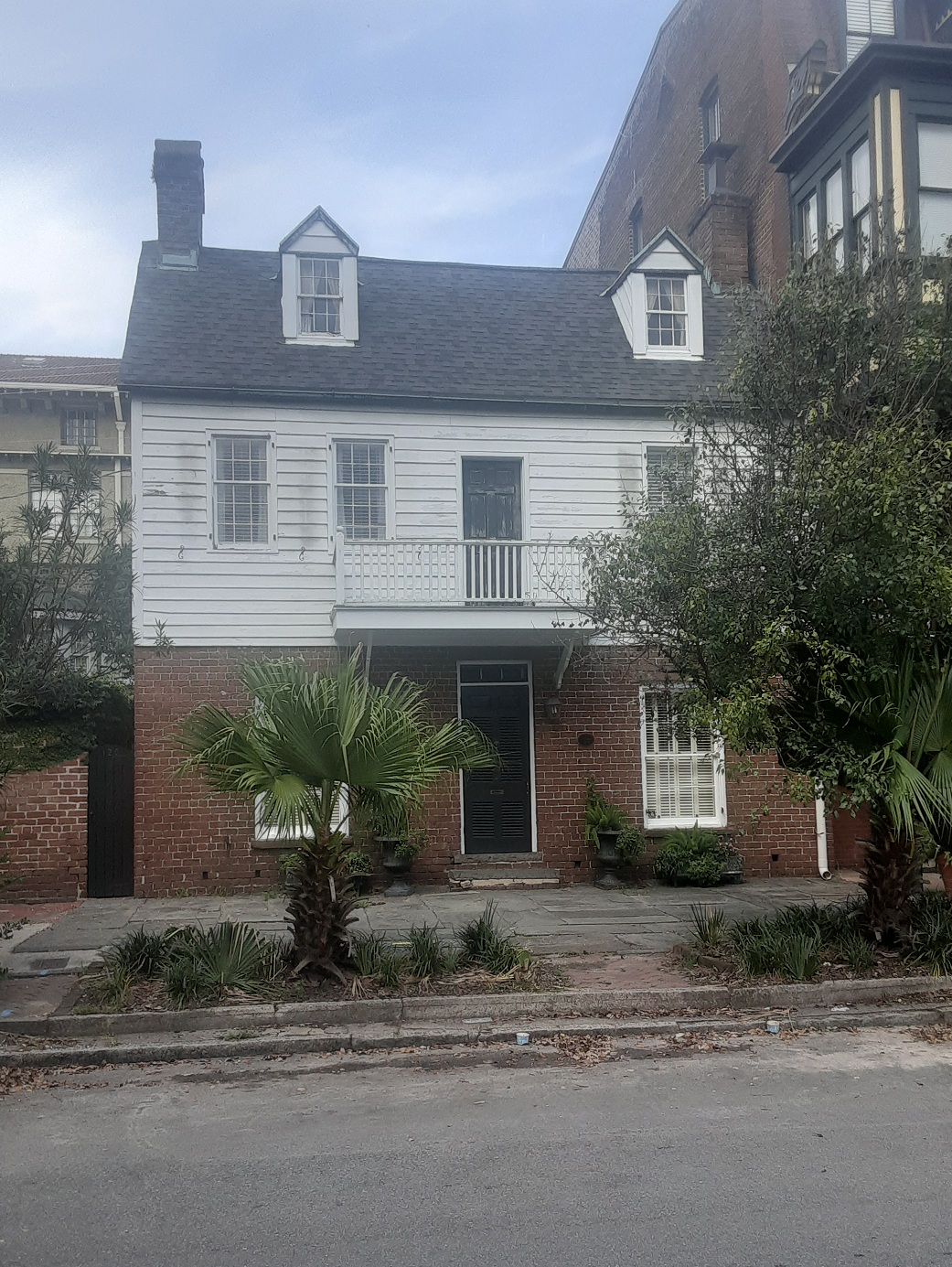
- The building in 2021
- Interactive map of the Christian Camphor Cottage area

General information
- Location: Savannah, Georgia, U.S., 122 East Oglethorpe Avenue
- Coordinates: 32.0766500°N 81.09083°W
- Completed: circa 1764 (262 years ago)

Technical details
- Floor count: 3

The Christian Camphor Cottage is a home located at 122 East Oglethorpe Avenue in Savannah, Georgia, United States. It is believed to be the oldest extant structure in the city, dating to around 1764. It is part of the Savannah Historic District, and in a survey for Historic Savannah Foundation, Mary Lane Morrison found the building to be of significant status.

A saltbox house, the property was originally two storeys; it was raised onto a brick foundation in 1871. Its original balcony was remodeled in 1907.

== See also ==
- Buildings in Savannah Historic District
