= George Sydney Hawkins =

American judge and politician (1808–1878)

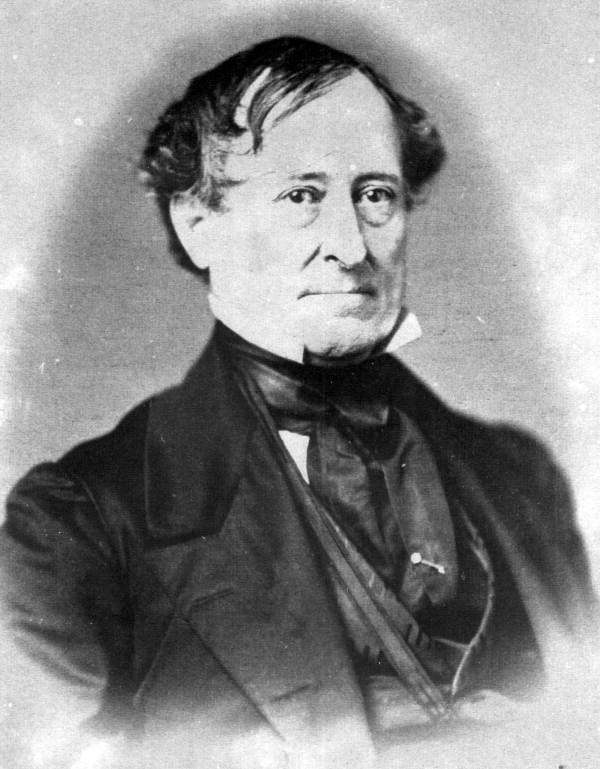

Member of the U.S. House of Representatives from Florida's at-large district
- In office March 4, 1857 – January 21, 1861
- Preceded by: Augustus Maxwell
- Succeeded by: Charles M. Hamilton

Personal details
- Born: 1808 Kingston, New York
- Died: March 15, 1878 (aged 69–70) Marianna, Florida
- Party: Democratic
- Education: Columbia University

George Sydney Hawkins (1808 – March 15, 1878) was a U.S. representative from Florida. Born in Kingston, Ulster County, New York; attended the common schools and was graduated from Columbia University, New York City; studied law; was admitted to the bar and practiced; moved to Florida and settled in Pensacola, Florida; served as captain in the Indian war of 1837; member of the Legislative Council of the Territory of Florida; appointed district attorney in 1841; appointed United States district attorney for the Apalachicola district in Florida in 1842; associate justice of the Florida Supreme Court 1846–1850; elected judge of the circuit court in January 1851; member of the Florida House of Representatives; served in the Florida State Senate; collector of customs for the port of Apalachicola; elected as a Democrat to the Thirty-fifth and Thirty-sixth Congresses and served from March 4, 1857, to January 21, 1861, when he withdrew; judge of the district court under the Confederate Government 1862–1865; commissioned by the legislation of 1877 to prepare a digest of the State laws of Florida.

In 1832, he married Jane Louisa Early, adopted daughter of Eleazer Early and Jane Meriweather Paterson. She died two years into the marriage.

Hawkins died in Marianna, Florida, in 1878; interment in St. Luke's Episcopal Cemetery.

U.S. House of Representatives
Preceded by Augustus Maxwell	Member of the U.S. House of Representatives from Florida's at-large congressional district 1857 – 1861	Succeeded by Charles Memorial Hamilton
