= Supermini (disambiguation) =

Supermini is a class of automobile larger than a city car but smaller than a small family car, also known as the B-segment.

Supermini may also refer to:

- Gurgel Supermini, a small Brazilian car produced 1992–1994
- Superminicomputer, a 1970s term for a minicomputer

== See also ==
- Subcompact car
