= Minnie, West Virginia =

Minnie
- Unincorporated community
- Location within the state of West Virginia Minnie (the United States)
- Coordinates: 39°35′23″N 80°48′36″W
- Country: United States
- State: West Virginia
- County: Wetzel
- Elevation: 643 ft (196 m)
- Time zone: UTC-5 (Eastern (EST))
  - Summer (DST): UTC-4 (EDT)
- GNIS ID: 1549827

Minnie is an unincorporated community in Wetzel County, West Virginia, United States.

The community most likely was named after Minnie Morgan, the daughter of an early settler.
