= Abraham Minis (born 1694) =

Merchant and shipper (1694–1757)

- Born: 1694
- Died: January 13, 1757 (aged 62 or 63); Savannah, Province of Georgia
- Resting place: Bull Street Cemetery, Savannah, Georgia, U.S.
- Occupation: merchant shipper
- Spouse: Abigail Minis (c. 1730–1757; his death)
- Children: Philip Minis

Abraham Minis (1694 – January 13, 1757) was a European immigrant to the newly settled colony of Savannah, Province of Georgia, in 1733. Despite their not knowing if they would be received, General James Oglethorpe, founder of the Savannah colony, allowed Minis and his family entry and granted them land. Their descendants have lived in Savannah ever since.

Minis became a farmer and merchant shipper who supplied Oglethorpe at Fort Frederica on St. Simons Island.

== Early life and career ==
Minis, an Ashkenazi Jew of German origin, was born in 1694.

He married Abigail, with whom he had two daughters, Leah (born 1726) and Esther (1731), prior to their emigration to colonial America aboard the William and Sarah. Neither Leah nor Esther had any descendants. A third child, Philip, was born in Savannah, the year following their 1733 arrival, becoming the first white male child born in the colony. They went on to have six more children (one of whom died in infancy): daughters Judith, Hannah and Sarah, and sons Minis, Joseph and Samuel. The girls all survived their mother, whereas the sons all died before her.

The Minises arrived in Savannah on July 11, 1733, shortly after General James Oglethorpe. In addition to the Minises and their two children, Abraham's brother, Simeon, also made the voyage. He had no descendants.

Oglethorpe granted the family land, although it was in a swamp and was "so frequently under water" that he was unable to drain and farm it.

Abraham's name appears in the general conveyance of town lots and farms that was implemented in December 1733, which makes it one of the earliest deeds in the colony.

By 1736, Minis had become a merchant shipper, one of the first settlers in Georgia to have commercial interest. He was in partnership with a local man, with the business known as Minis & Salomons. In research published in 1917, they were deemed to be the first merchants doing business in Georgia, for the previously accepted claimants of Harris & Habersham were established in 1749.

While many colonists left Georgia around 1740, after disagreements over the Trustees' policies, the Minis family remained.

=== Descendants ===
Minis' great-grandson (son of Philip's son Isaac), also named Abraham, built several properties in Savannah in the 19th century. He was "one of Savannah's leading merchants and a citizen of the highest integrity and social influence."

Later Minises were founding members of the Congregation Mickve Israel, the Hibernian Society and the Oglethorpe Club.

=== Death ===
Minis died in 1757 in Savannah. He was 62 or 63 years old, and left widow Abigail with eight children to raise. He is interred in the former Bull Street Cemetery, a Jewish burial ground allotted in 1733 by James Oglethorpe at the northwestern corner of today's Bull Street and West Oglethorpe Avenue. A memorial, in the median of Oglethorpe Avenue, lists the twenty people known to be interred there. Abigail, who survived her husband by 37 years, is buried in the Mordecai Sheftall Cemetery, a Jewish cemetery in Savannah.
