= Moon River Brewing Company =

Brew pub and restaurant in Savannah, Georgia

Coordinates: 32.081004°N 81.09202°W

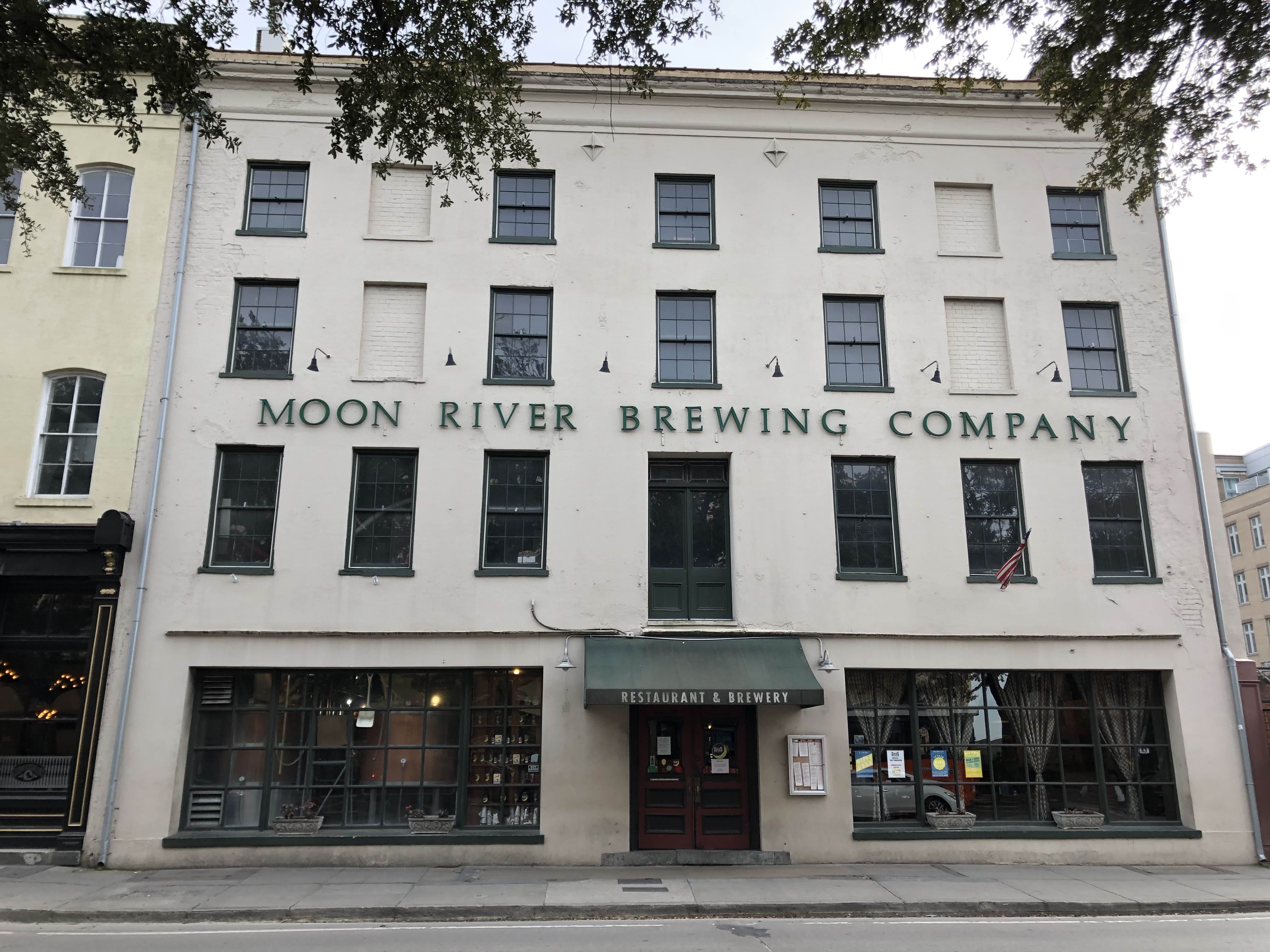
- Industry: Restaurant brewery
- Founded: April 10, 1999
- Headquarters: Savannah, Georgia, U.S.
- Key people: Eugene H. Beeco, Jr. (Founder); John Pinkerton (Founder, Proprietor & Brewmaster Emeritus)
- Products: Beer

Moon River Brewing Company was a brew pub, restaurant, bar and brewing facility located at 21 West Bay Street in Savannah, Georgia, United States.

== Brewery ==
Moon River Brewing Company opened to the public in 1999 on the site of the former Oglethorpe Brewing Co. Its current owners are Gene Beeco and John Pinkerton. In 2010, the brewery won a gold medal for its Rosemary India Pale Ale in the "Herb and Spice or Chocolate Beer" category at the Great American Beer Festival in Denver, Colorado. In 2003, the brewery was voted #28 on the "Top 50 American Brewpubs" in the United States by BeerAdvocate.com. In 2014, the brewery won a gold medal for its "Bomb," an Irish-style stout at the World Beer Cup. In 2017, Moon River Brewing Company took home a gold medal at the Great American Beer Festival for their Wild Wacky Wit in the "Belgian-style Witbeir" category. Along with the medal, they were also awarded "Best Mid-size Brewpub & Mid-size Brewpub Brewer of the Year."

== History of the building ==
Moon River Brewing Company is located in the former City Hotel. Eleazer Early built the City Hotel in 1821 on a lot purchased four years earlier by his wife. Not only was it the first hotel in Savannah, but it was also home to the first branch of the United States Post Office in Savannah, as well as a branch of the Bank of the United States. Many notable people stayed at the City Hotel, including War of 1812 hero Winfield Scott, the Marquis de Lafayette, the first three commodores of the U.S. Navy and naturalist John James Audubon. Audubon stayed six months while attempting to sell books full of his wildlife sketches.

In 1851, Peter Wiltberger bought the City Hotel. He renovated it and put a live lion and lioness on display to draw attention to his business. City Hotel's final guest checked out in 1864, just before the arrival of General William Tecumseh Sherman during the Civil War and the subsequent closing of the City Hotel. At the turn of the century, the building was used as a lumber and coal warehouse. As the use of coal slowly died off, the building was used for general storage. In the 1960s, the space was renovated as an office supply store, complete with a large printing press. Hurricane David forced this business to close in 1979 when it blew the roof off the structure. The building sat empty until 1995 when it was renovated into its current configuration as a brew pub.

== In the media ==
=== Television ===
In 2005, the brewery was featured in the Ghost Hunters Halloween special. In 2009, Moon River was also on Travel Channel's paranormal television series Ghost Adventures, and in 2018 on an episode of BuzzFeed Unsolved: Supernatural.

Moon River Brewery was also featured as a haunted location on paranormal TV series Most Terrifying Places which aired on the Travel Channel in 2019.
