= Minicar =

Minicar or mini car may refer to:

- Bond Minicar, a three-wheeler made by Bond Cars Ltd
- City car, a European car classification
- Kei car, a Japanese car classification
- Mini, a popular British small car made from 1959 to 2000
- Mini (marque), a British car brand owned by BMW
- Mini 4WD, an AA-powered toy car that used to be popular in Asia

== See also ==
- Car (disambiguation)
- Small car (disambiguation)
- Microcar, a term often used for the smallest size of cars
- Minivan, an American car classification
- Model car, including children's minicars
- Pedal car, including children's car-silhouette quadricycle minicars
