= Hull Street =

Prominent street in Savannah, Georgia

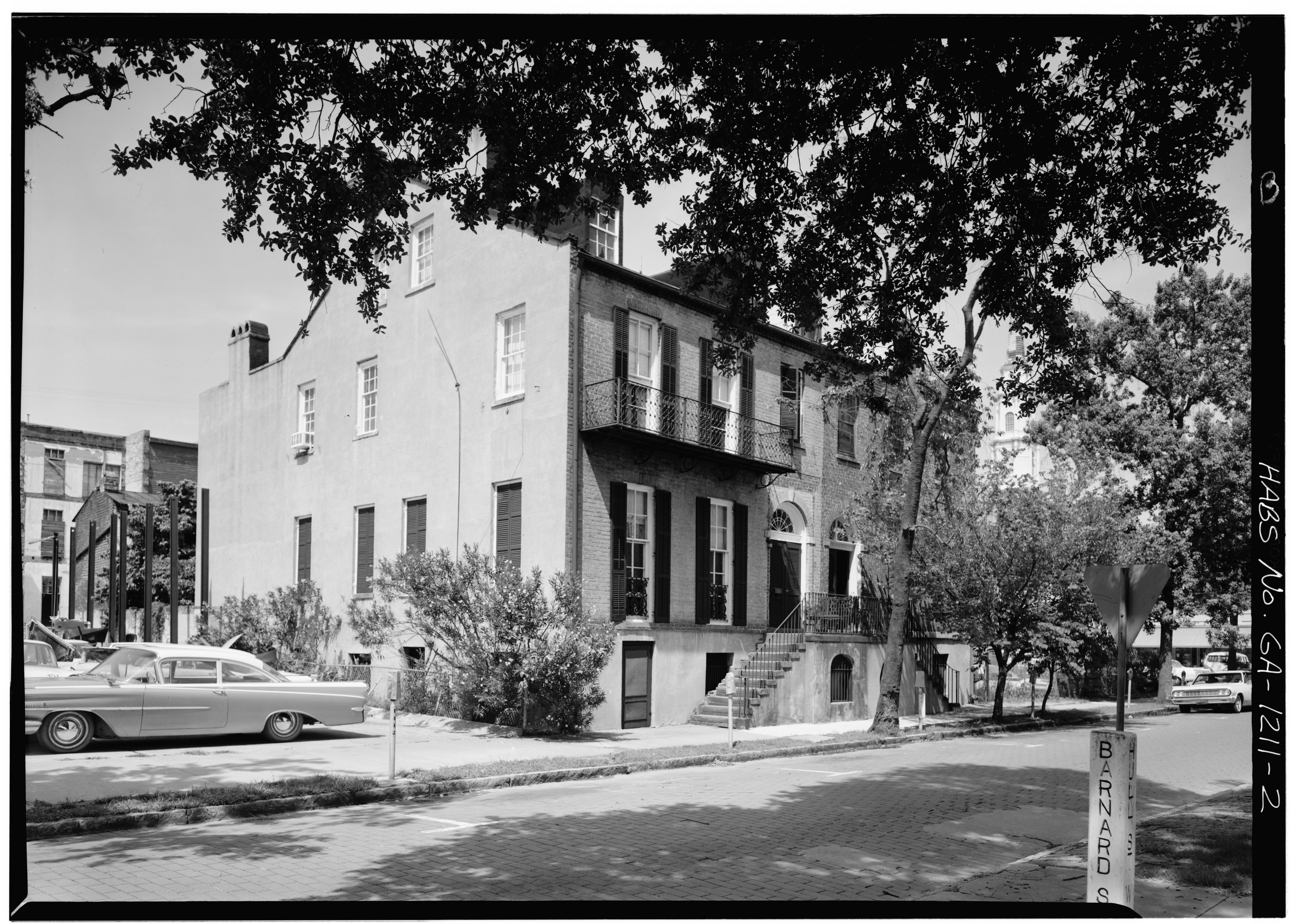
- John H. Ash House, West Hull Street
- Former name: Chatham Street (1801 to 1815)
- Namesake: Isaac Hull
- Length: 0.5 mi (0.80 km)
- Location: Savannah, Georgia, U.S.
- West end: Jefferson Street (western section); Habersham Street (eastern section)
- East end: Abercorn Street (western section); East Broad Street (eastern section)

Hull Street is a prominent street in Savannah, Georgia, United States. Located between Oglethorpe Avenue to the north and Perry Street to the south, it runs for about 0.50 miles (0.80 km) from Jefferson Street in the west to East Broad Street in the east. It is interrupted by Colonial Park Cemetery from Abercorn Street to Habersham Street. Originally known only as Hull Street singular, its addresses are now split between "West Hull Street" and "East Hull Street", the transition occurring at Bull Street in the center of the downtown area. Hull Street is named for commodore Isaac Hull, who served in the War of 1812. The street is entirely within Savannah Historic District, a National Historic Landmark District.

Hull Street passes through three squares on their northern side. From west to east:

- Orleans Square
- Chippewa Square
- Crawford Square

== Notable buildings and structures ==
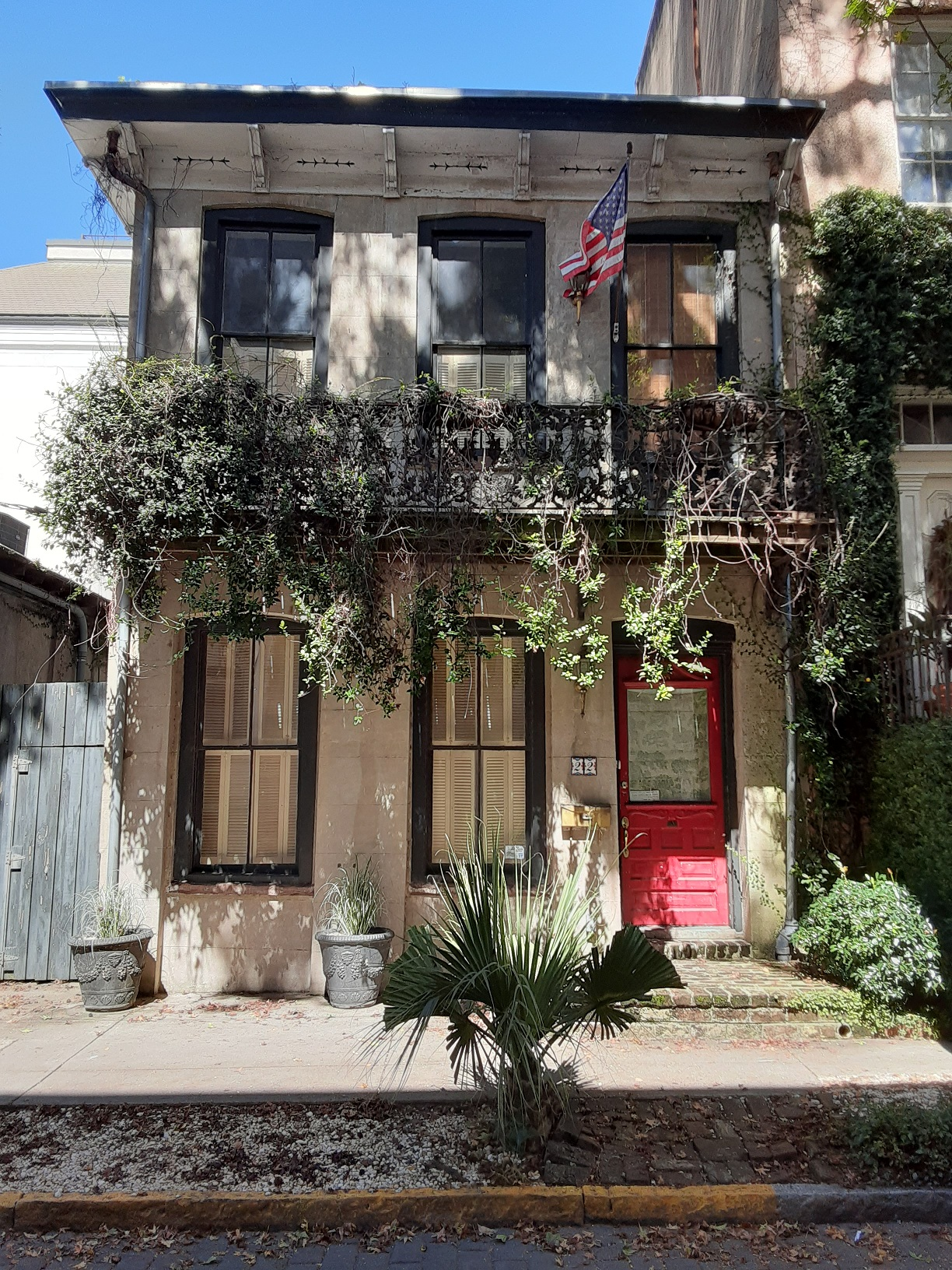
Julius Perlinski House, 22 West Hull Street

Below is a selection of notable buildings and structures on Hull Street, all in Savannah's Historic District. From west to east:

- John H. Ash House, 114–116 West Hull Street (1817)
- Julius Perlinski House, 22 West Hull Street (circa 1903)
- John Scudder Property (I), 20 West Hull Street (1858)
- John Scudder Property (II), 18 West Hull Street (1857)
- Louis Knorr Property, 16 West Hull Street (1896)
- Honora Foley Property ("Foley House Inn"), 14 West Hull Street (1896)
