= Bull Street Cemetery =

Cemetery in Savannah, Georgia

- Interactive map of Bull Street Cemetery

Details
- Established: 1733
- Closed: circa 1820
- Location: Bull Street at West Oglethorpe Avenue; Savannah, Georgia, U.S.
- Country: United States
- Coordinates: 32.076951°N 81.092918°W
- No. of graves: 16
- Find a Grave: Bull Street Cemetery

Bull Street Cemetery was a Jewish cemetery established in Savannah, Province of Georgia, in 1733. Today, a memorial in the median of West Oglethorpe Avenue, at Bull Street, erected in 1983 by the trustees of the Mordecai Sheftall Cemetery, marks the former location of the cemetery. The cemetery contained at least sixteen graves when it was built over around a century after it opened. The memorial says: "Original 1733 burial plot allotted by James Edward Oglethorpe to the Savannah Jewish Community."

On November 3, 1761, George III "conveyed a certain half lot of land in Holland Tything, Percival Ward, to David Truan." This land was at the northwest corner of today's Bull Street and Oglethorpe Avenue.

Several Jews were interred here before the family cemeteries were established. To honor the services of Benjamin Sheftall, one of the original forty or so Jews who arrived in Savannah on July 11, 1733, South Broad Street (as Oglethorpe Avenue was originally known) was extended to include within its bounds the unmarked burial of Sheftall's mother.

The burial ground was closed in the first half of the 19th century, with some of the headstones that would otherwise have been discarded used as doorsteps at homes in the neighborhood.

== Burials ==
The sixteen known burials in the cemetery:

- David Rodrigues de Miranda
- David Lopez de Pass
- Isaac D'Oliveira
- Benjamin Gideon
- Anne Marks
- Abraham Minis (1694–1757), European immigrant to, and early settler of, Savannah
- Joseph Minis
- Samuel Minis
- Joseph Morent
- Rachel Montsonte
- Rachel (or Rebecca) Nunes
- Elias Sheftall
- Perla Sheftall (died 1736), wife of Benjamin
- Solomon Sheftall
- Sheftall Sheftall
- Jacob Yowell
