= Miniș =

Miniș may refer to several places in Romania:

== Rivers ==
- Miniș (Bega), a tributary of the Bega in Timiș County
- Miniș, a tributary of the Cigher in Arad County
- Miniș (Nera), a tributary of the Nera in Caraș-Severin County
- Miniș, a tributary of the Topa in Bihor County

== Settlements ==
- Miniș, a village in Ghioroc Commune, Arad County
- Minișu de Sus and Minișel, villages in Tauț Commune, Arad County
