= Eleazer Early =

American hotelier

- Born: 1779; Orange County, Virginia, U.S.
- Died: June 29, 1840 (aged 60–61); Washington, D.C., U.S.
- Burial place: Congressional Cemetery, Washington, D.C., U.S.
- Occupation: Hotelier

Eleazer Early (1779 – June 29, 1840) was an American hotelier. In 1821, he built the first hotel in Savannah, Georgia, to a design by noted architect William Jay. In 1984, the significance of the building was recognized by the Historical American Buildings Survey. That same year, architectural students of the Savannah College of Art and Design determined that Jay was the building's architect.

Early later became the second librarian of the United States House of Representatives.

== Life and early career ==
Early, a descendent of English immigrant John Early, was born in Orange County, Virginia, in early 1779, to Joel Early and Lucy Smith. Eleazer's brother, Peter, was a future governor of the State of Georgia. Their sister, Lucy, later married Charles Lewis Mathews.

The family had moved to Wilkes County, Georgia, by 1790. A family feud led to Joel Early disinheriting his son.

In 1799, Early was a merchant in Augusta, Georgia.

After being declared bankrupt in 1802, the following year he married Jane Meriweather Paterson in Richmond County, Georgia. His new bride had "inherited handsomely" from her maternal uncle Thomas Meriweather. His new sister-in-law, Susannah, had recently become the third wife of Daniel Sturges Jr., Georgia State Surveyor. Susannah died around 1811, shortly after giving birth to Jane Louisa Sturges and a year after her husband was jailed for debt. The Earlys fostered their niece, changing her surname to their own. Sturges died around twelve years later.

One of Early's first roles was as comptroller general for the State of Georgia, between around 1806 until 1809, when David Brydie Mitchell was elected as governor. Mitchell instead made him secretary in his executive department.

He ran for the office of Secretary of State of the Georgia State Legislature, but was defeated by Horatio Marbury.

The Earlys returned to Early's former home of Augusta in 1810. Eleazer worked as cashier of the Bank of Augusta.

In 1812, he submitted completed a survey of the State of Georgia, created by his brother-in-law's hand, and submitted the resulting map to the City of Savannah.

Savannah, Georgia, became the Early family's home in 1816. Eleazer began working as cashier at the Bank of the State of Georgia, but transferred a short time later to the newly established Second Bank of the United States.

Another map was engraved by Samuel Harrison in 1818. The following year, Early is listed as having paid $23.25 tax on three slaves, a carriage and building on two lots in Savannah valued at $7,000. With his class standing having improved markedly, Early sent Jane Louisa to boarding school in Philadelphia, to which the family moved.

=== City Hotel ===
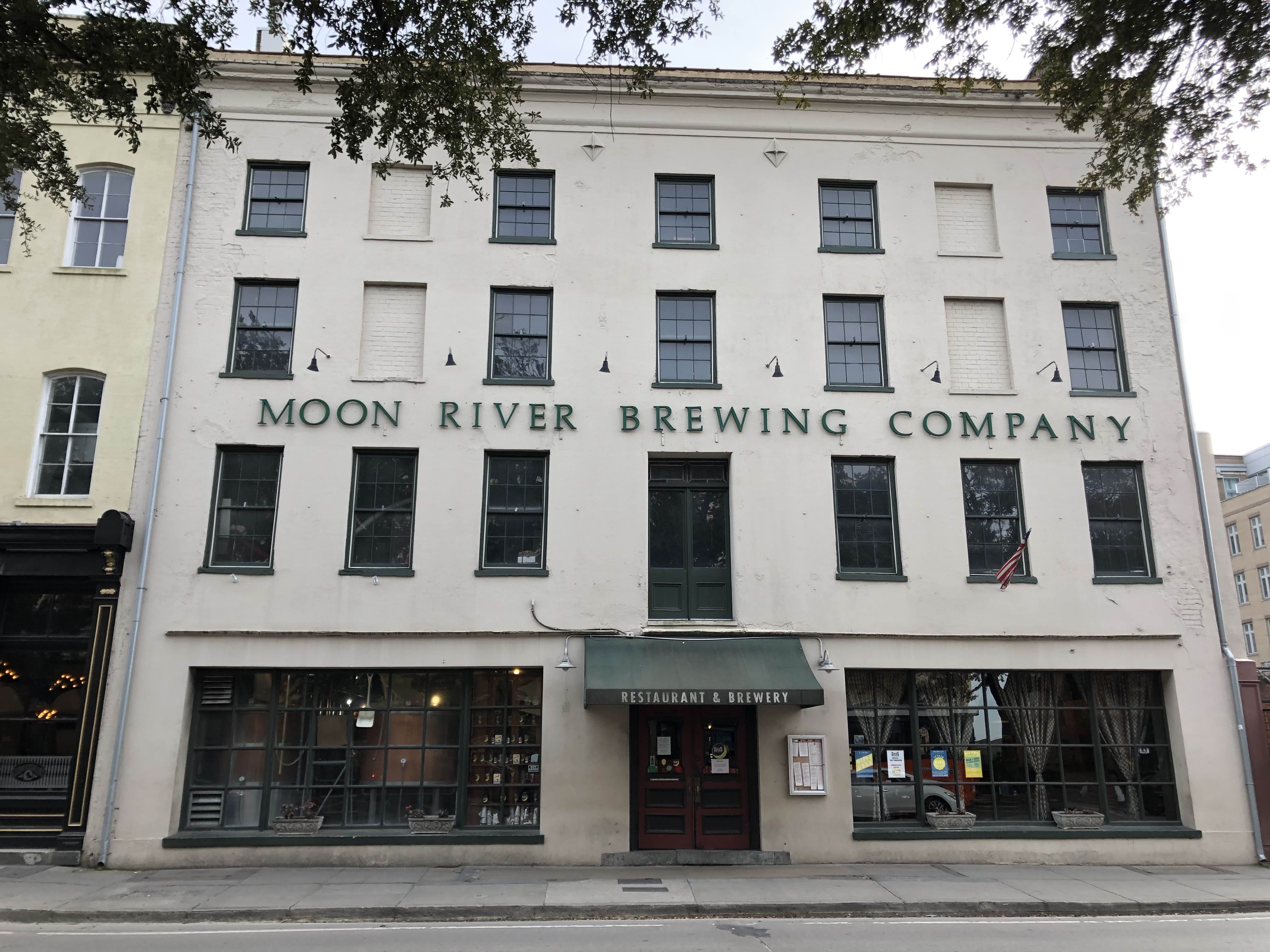
The former City Hotel, pictured in 2019

In 1821, Early built City Hotel, the first hotel in Savannah, Georgia. It was designed by William Jay, and was built on land purchased by his wife four years earlier. It had "33 rooms, exclusive of the bar." It evoked the habits of extravagance which his father had found distasteful from early on. Early borrowed $9,000 from Hampden McIntosh.

In January 1820, during the building's construction, it was damaged by the fire that swept through Savannah.

Having become Savannah's postmaster in July 1820, the hotel housed, as lessees, the first branch of the United States Post Office in the city, as well as a branch of the Second Bank of the United States, of which Early was the first cashier. By this point, the Earlys held eight slaves, five of whom were younger than fourteen.

In October 1820, Jane Early transferred the property into her husband's name.

Early leased the hotel to Orran (possibly Oran) Byrd, also of Charleston, in January 1821. Byrd agreed to a $4,000 rental fee. Byrd became the postmaster of the hotel's Post Office. He placed a "classically bordered advertisement in Joshua Shaw's United States Directory for the Use of Travellers and Merchants of 1823:

This elegant establishment, which is entirely new with all its furniture and other arrangements, is in the centre of business and contiguous to the banks, and the post office is attached to the premises. All the stages start from the door.

In 1822, Early petitioned to have the elevated bridge built across Bay Lane to a building facing Bryan Street. It is still there today. An ill-advised hotel venture on Tybee Island eventually led to Byrd falling behind on his rent to Early. As a result, in 1825, the Savannah sheriff advertised the sale of hotel furnishings. Although Byrd foundered, the hotel survived.

In April 1825, the hotel was sold, "at public outcry", in front of the Savannah Cotton Exchange. Early had lost the property to the Bank of Darien.

=== Later life ===
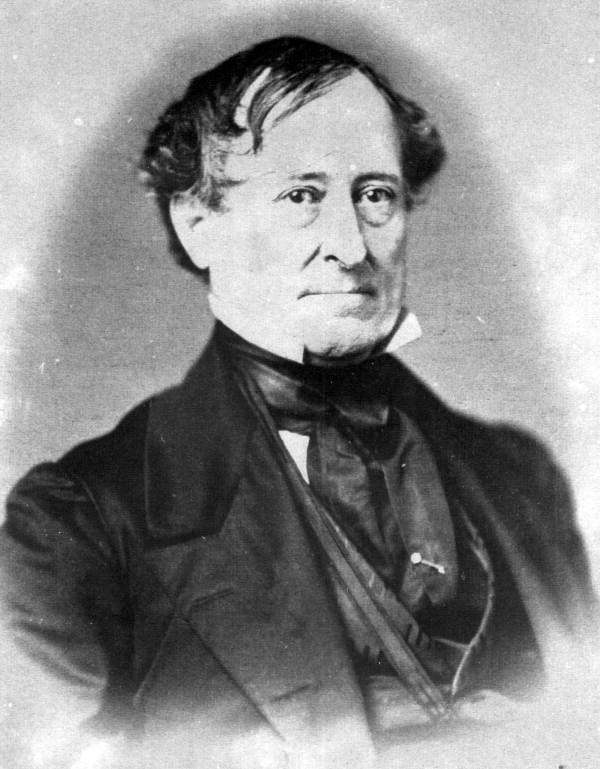
Early's adopted daughter, Jane Louisa, married George Sydney Hawkins in 1832

In 1822, Early began a tour of the United States in support of William H. Crawford's run for presidency.

After his labors in support for Andrew Jackson, Early became the second librarian of the House of Representatives, formerly of the State of Georgia, in 1834. According to his obituary in The Baltimore Sun, "he was rarely seen in the Hall of the House of Representatives, and was generally found in his office, leading a life of seclusion."

Early was living in Jackson County, Florida, in 1830.

== Death ==
Early died in 1840, aged 60 or 61, while in Washington, D.C. The funeral was held in the home of an Ann Sprigg, widow of Benjamin Sprigg, on June 30. He was interred in Congressional Cemetery in the capital. His wife predeceased him by fourteen years. Their foster child, Jane, to whom Early's wife had left her entire estate, died in 1834, two years after marrying George Sydney Hawkins.
