= Isaac Minis =

- Minis around 1810
- Born: July 30, 1780; Charleston County, South Carolina, U.S.
- Died: November 15, 1856 (aged 76); Philadelphia, Pennsylvania, U.S.
- Resting place: Laurel Grove Cemetery, Savannah, Georgia, U.S.
- Spouse: Dinah Cohen (1803–1856; his death)
- Children: Philip Minis; Abram Minis

Isaac Minis (July 30, 1780 – November 15, 1856) was a private in the War of 1812 and a member of several administrations of Savannah's city council. He later became an associate of future Confederate general Robert E. Lee.

== Early life and career ==
Minis was born in 1780, to Philip Minis and Judith Polock. It is believed he was born in a cave near Charleston, South Carolina, while the city was under attack by the British during the American Revolutionary War.

On December 4, 1803, he married Dinah Cohen (1787–1874), sister of Solomon Cohen Jr., a noted Savannah lawyer, with whom he had eight known children: Philip (born 1805), Sarah (1811), Philippa (1818), Abram (1820), Frances (1823), Maria (1825), Rebecca Gratz (1830) and Cecelia (1832). Philip became a noted Savannah physician, while Abram was "one of Savannah's leading merchants and a citizen of the highest integrity and social influence."

In September 1810, Minis was elected as an alderman to the 21st Administration of the Savannah city council, headed by mayor William Bulloch. He served again in 1811–1813, 1815–1816, 1824–1828 (resigned on April 24, 1828) and 1830–1832.

Minis was one of the first members of Savannah's Hibernian Society upon its 1812 formation.

He served as a private in the War of 1812, in Captain William Bulloch's company of artillery, first regiment of Georgia militia, which was commanded by General Joseph E. Johnston.

In 1821, Minis and his sixteen-year-old son Philip boarded the SS Savannah for New York on what was, unbeknownst to them, its final voyage. Having had its engines removed to permit more room for cargo, the vessel ran aground at Fire Island on November 5. Its crew and three passengers were rescued, as was its cargo of cotton, but the ship's location meant it was a loss.

On March 18, 1825, Minis was present at a reception for General Gilbert du Motier, Marquis de Lafayette, in Savannah.

Minis built a house at 204 West Hull Street in Savannah in 1831; it was torn down just over a century later. The family hosted Confederate general Robert E. Lee on several occasions, including around 1861 (five years after Minis' death), when he was in Savannah to arrange for its defense in the American Civil War. On an earlier visit to the Minis home, he gave Sarah a pen-and-ink drawing of an alligator and a terrapin he had made while building Fort Pulaski on Cockspur Island.

== Death ==
Minis died in 1856, aged 76. He is interred in Savannah's Laurel Grove Cemetery. His wife survived him by eighteen years, and is buried beside him.

== Bibliography ==
- Morrison, John Harrison (1903): History Of American Steam Navigation. New York: W. F. Sametz & Co.
