= Philip Minis (physician) =

American physician, 1805–1855

- Born: January 28, 1805; Savannah, Georgia, U.S.
- Died: November 27, 1855 (aged 50) Baltimore, Maryland, U.S.
- Buried: Laurel Grove Cemetery, Savannah, Georgia, U.S.
- Allegiance: United States
- Branch: United States Army
- Rank: Major
- Known for: Doctor known for killing in the Stark–Minis duel
- Alma mater: University of Pennsylvania
- Spouse: Sarah Augustus Livingston (1836–1855; his death)

Philip Minis (January 28, 1805 – November 27, 1855) was a 19th-century American medical doctor. He was an assistant surgeon in the United States Army, later promoted to major. Either side of this, he was involved in a notable duel in Savannah, Georgia, where he worked. He was found not guilty in the ensuing murder trial.

== Life and career ==
Minis was born in 1805, in Savannah, Georgia, to Isaac Minis and Dinah Cohen. One of his siblings, Abram Minis, became a prominent merchant in that city.

He graduated as a Doctor of Medicine from the University of Pennsylvania in 1824.

Minis was commissioned as an assistant surgeon in the United States Army on April 12, 1826. He was promoted to major in 1836.

On May 16, 1836, Minis married Sarah Augusta Livingston (1807–1892) of New York, daughter of John Swift and Anna M. M. Thompson. They had the following children together: Alice Henrietta (born 1837), Leila (1847), Charles Spalding, Annie, Mary Lela, Philip Henry, John Livingston and Augusta Medora.

=== Stark–Minis duel ===
A fight between James Jones Stark and Minis that began in the spring of 1832 in Savannah's Luddington's bar ended on August 10 in the bar of the City Hotel by virtue of Minis shooting Stark dead with a pistol. Minis went on trial for murder and was acquitted.

=== Death ===
Minis died in 1855, in Baltimore, Maryland, aged 50. He is interred in Savannah's Laurel Grove Cemetery.
