= Minié =

Minié or Minie may refer to:

- Claude-Étienne Minié (1804–1879), French Army officer and weapons designer
  - Minié rifle, designed by Claude-Étienne Minié
  - Minié ball, a rifle bullet designed by Claude-Étienne Minié
- Victor Minié, French aviation designer with an eponymous firm
- Minie Brinkhoff (born 1952), retired Dutch cyclist

== See also ==
- Mini (disambiguation)
- Minni (disambiguation)
- Minnie (disambiguation)
