= Abraham Minis (born 1820) =

American merchant (1820–1889)

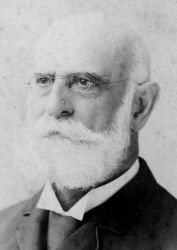
- Minis around 1889
- Born: November 4, 1820; Savannah, Georgia, U.S.
- Died: November 6, 1889 (aged 69); New York, U.S.
- Resting place: Laurel Grove Cemetery
- Occupation: merchant
- Spouse: Lavinia "Venie" Florence (1822–1889; his death)
- Parent(s): Isaac Minis; Dinah Cohen

Abraham Minis (commonly known as Abram Minis; November 4, 1820 – November 6, 1889) was an American merchant, prominent in Savannah, Georgia, in the 19th century.

== Early life and career ==
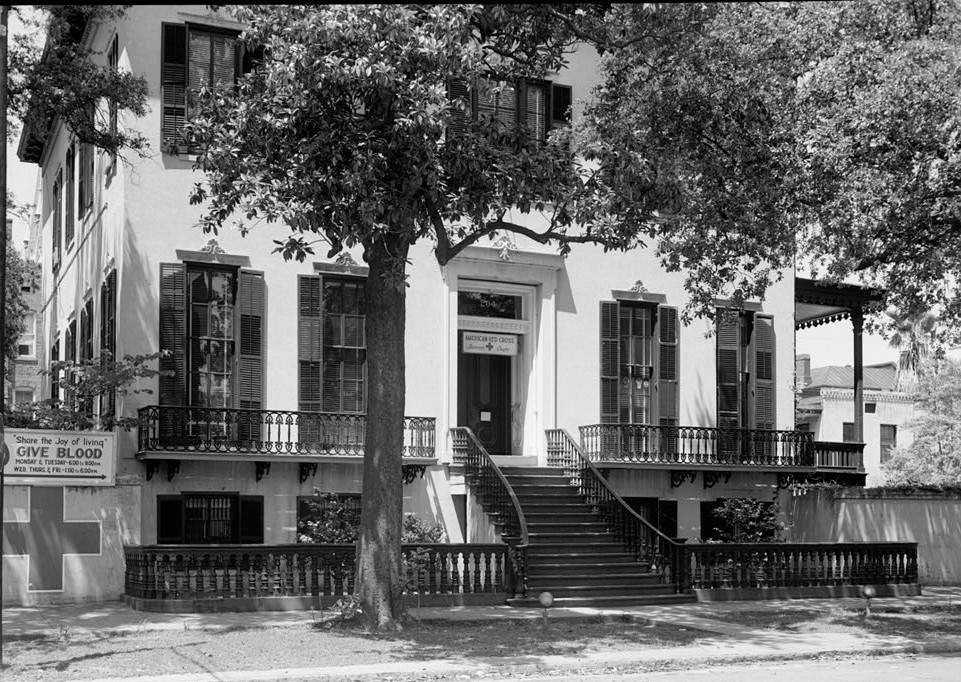
Minis' home, at today's 204 East Jones Street in Savannah

Minis was born on November 4, 1820, in Savannah, Georgia, to Isaac Minis and Dinah Cohen. His paternal great-grandparents were Abraham and Abigail Minis, two of the city's early Jewish settlers. His brother, Philip, was a Savannah physician.

On October 22, 1851, he married New Orleans native Lavinia "Venie" Florence (1825–1923), who had been living in Philadelphia, and with whom he had five children, two of whom (sons Jacob Florance and Isaac) he went into partnership with. A third son, Abram Jr. (1859–1939), became a prominent lawyer in Savannah. The other children were daughters Maria (1853–1941) and Rosina Florance (1855–1856). The family lived at today's 204 East Jones Street. Its architect was Stephen Decatur Button.

In 1846, Minis had built a property (now known as the Abram Minis Building) in Savannah's Franklin Square. Nine years later, at the eastern end of the same block, he built another property at 302–304 West St. Julian Street.

The business of A. Minis & Sons continued beyond Abram Sr.'s death. Jacob closed the business upon his retirement.

Minis was physically unable to serve in the field during the Civil War. Though not in favor of secession, he supported the Confederate cause. He was given a position in the commissary's office at Savannah.

Post-war, the Minises summered in Nova Scotia, where they met inventor Alexander Graham Bell. Abram turned down an opportunity to invest in a prototype of the telephone, saying, "I cannot invest in the hope of a solid wire being able to carry a voice."

=== Properties ===
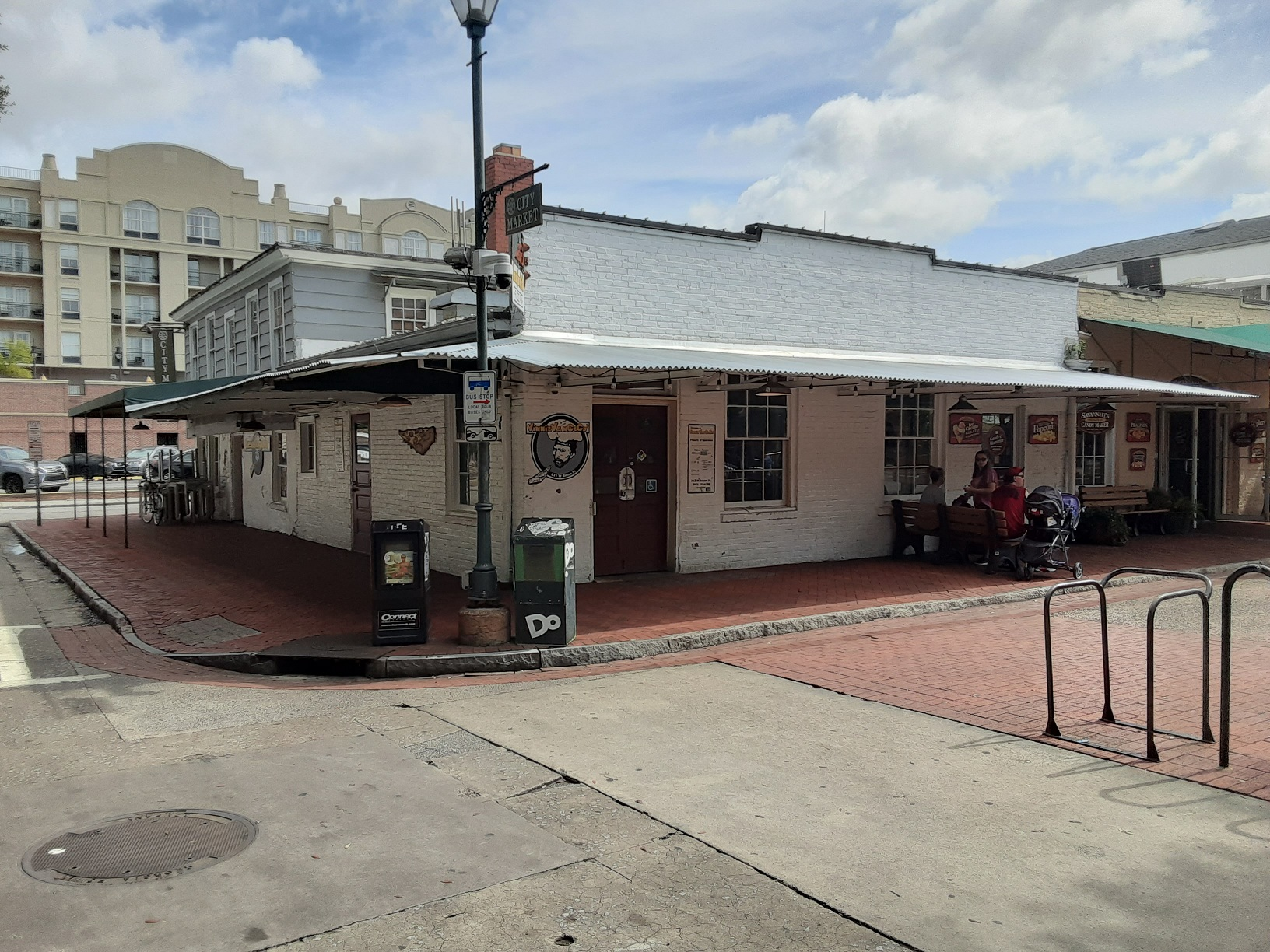
20–22 Montgomery Street, built by Minis in 1846

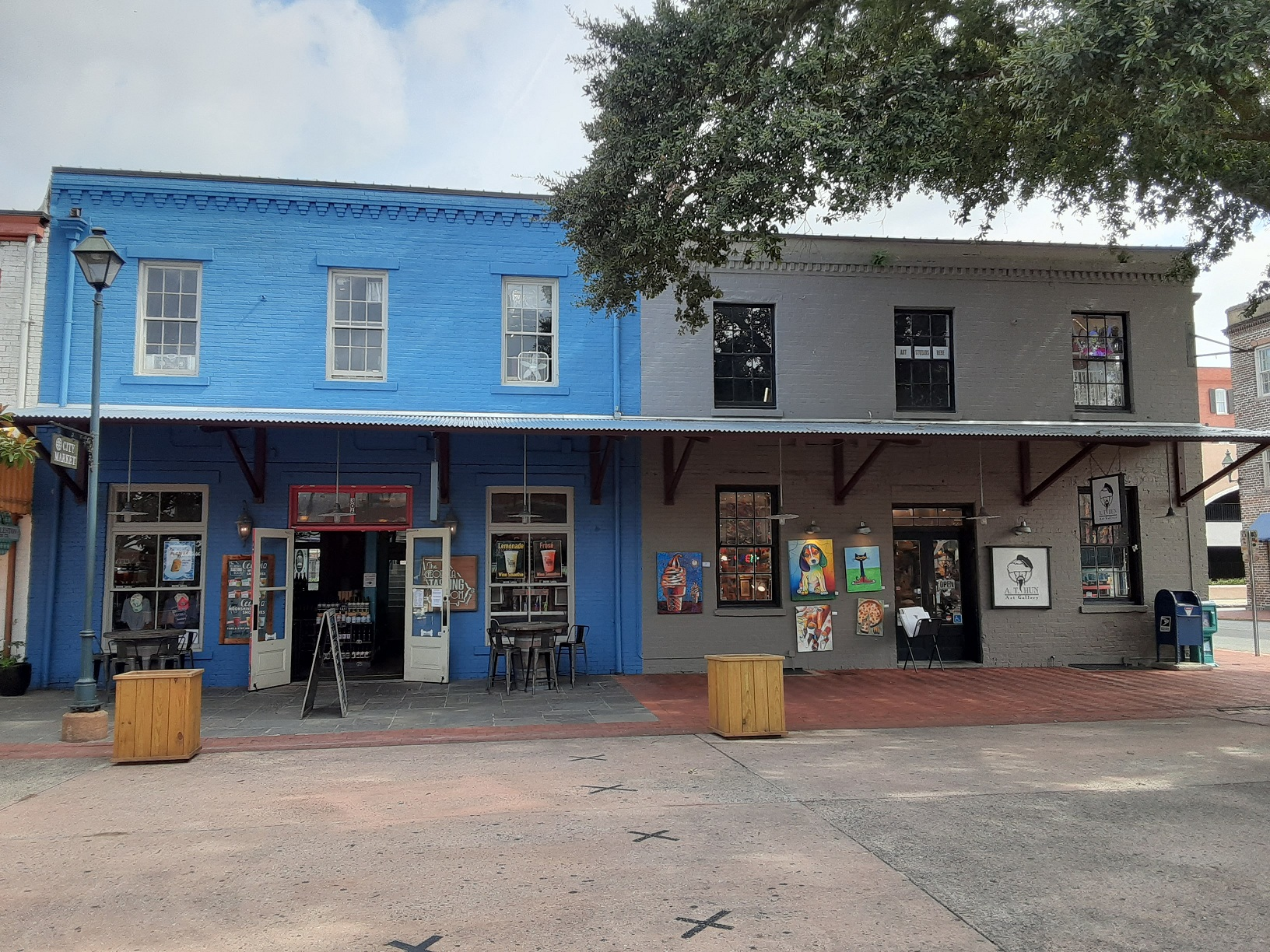
302–304 West St. Julian Street, built by Minis in 1855

== Death ==
Minis died while in New York on November 6, 1889, two days after his 69th birthday. His wife survived him by 34 years. They are both interred in Savannah's Laurel Grove Cemetery.

He has been described Minis as "one of Savannah's leading merchants and a citizen of the highest integrity and social influence."
