= Oglethorpe Avenue =

Prominent street in Savannah, Georgia

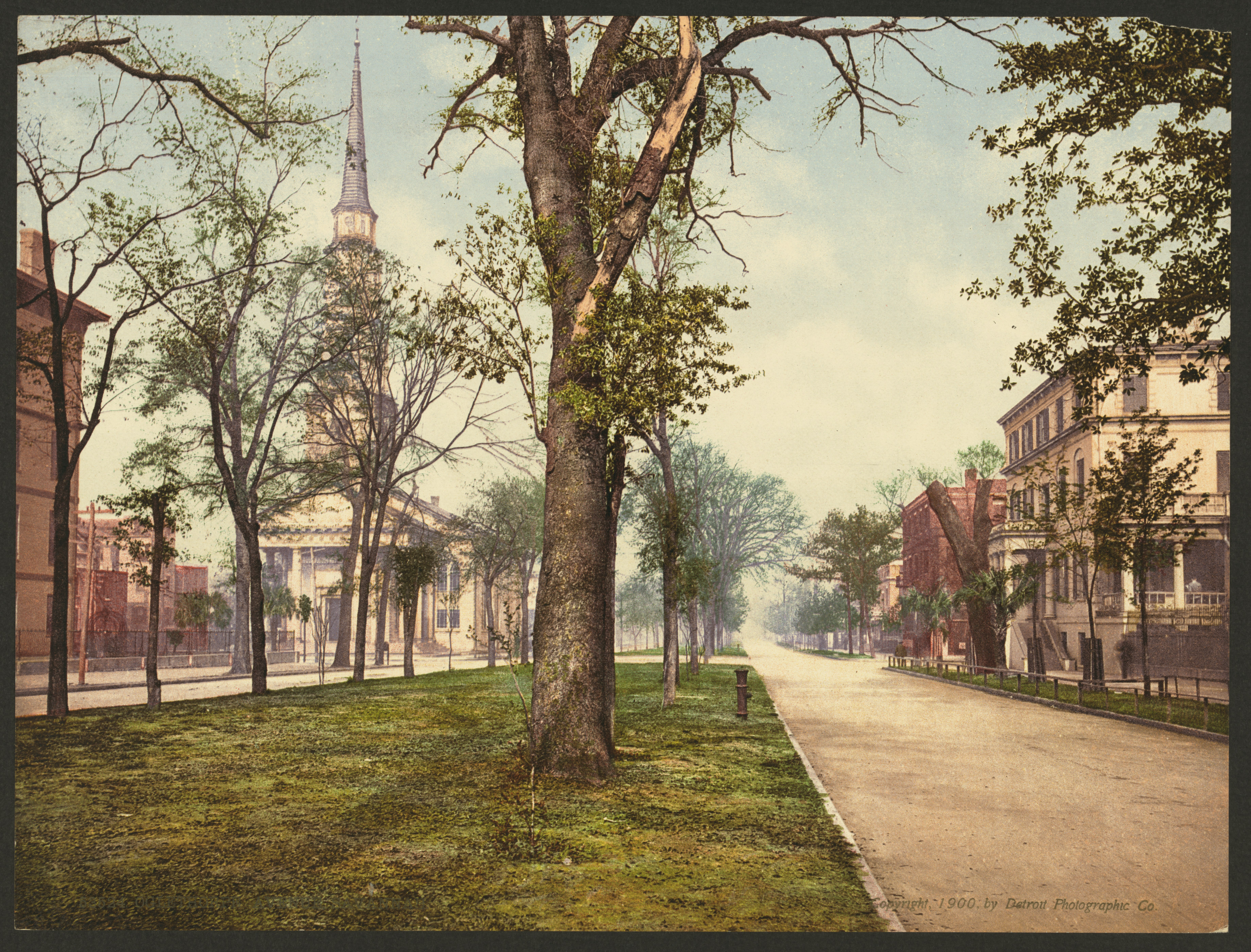
- A 1900 view from between Bull Street and Drayton Street, looking west toward the Independent Presbyterian Church
- Former names: South Broad Street (construction date to 1820); Market Street (from 1820); South Broad Street; Oglethorpe Avenue (1897 to present)
- Namesake: James Edward Oglethorpe
- Length: 1.26 mi (2.03 km)
- Location: Savannah, Georgia, U.S.
- West end: Atlantic Coastal Highway (U.S. Route 17)
- East end: Randolph Street

Oglethorpe Avenue is a prominent street in Savannah, Georgia, United States. Located, in its downtown section, between York Street to the north and Hull Street to the south, it runs for about 1.26 miles (2.03 km) from the Atlantic Coastal Highway (U.S. Route 17) in the west to Randolph Street in the east. It was originally known as South Broad Street, then Market Street. After being named South Broad Street again for a period, it became known as Oglethorpe Avenue in 1897. It was formerly Oglethorpe Avenue singular, but its addresses are now split between "West Oglethorpe Avenue" and "East Oglethorpe Avenue", the transition occurring at Bull Street in the center of the downtown area. The street is named for the founder of the Savannah colony, James Edward Oglethorpe.

The street is entirely within Savannah Historic District, a National Historic Landmark District. It contains what is believed to be the two oldest extant buildings in the city: Eppinger House and the Christian Camphor Cottage.

Oglethorpe Avenue runs between eight squares. From west to east:

To the south of

- Telfair Square
- Wright Square
- Oglethorpe Square
- Columbia Square
- Greene Square

To the north of

- Orleans Square
- Chippewa Square
- Crawford Square

The street also forms the northern boundary of Colonial Park Cemetery from Abercorn Street to Habersham Street.

A memorial in the median of Oglethorpe Avenue at Bull Street lists the twenty people known to be interred in a Jewish cemetery, today known as Bull Street Cemetery, which formerly stood there. It includes Abraham Minis, one of Savannah's early immigrants from Europe.

The street was once nicknamed "Under the Trees" due to its avenue of Pride of India trees.

== Notable buildings and structures ==
Below is a selection of notable buildings and structures on Oglethorpe Avenue, all in Savannah's Historic District. From west to east:

West Oglethorpe Avenue

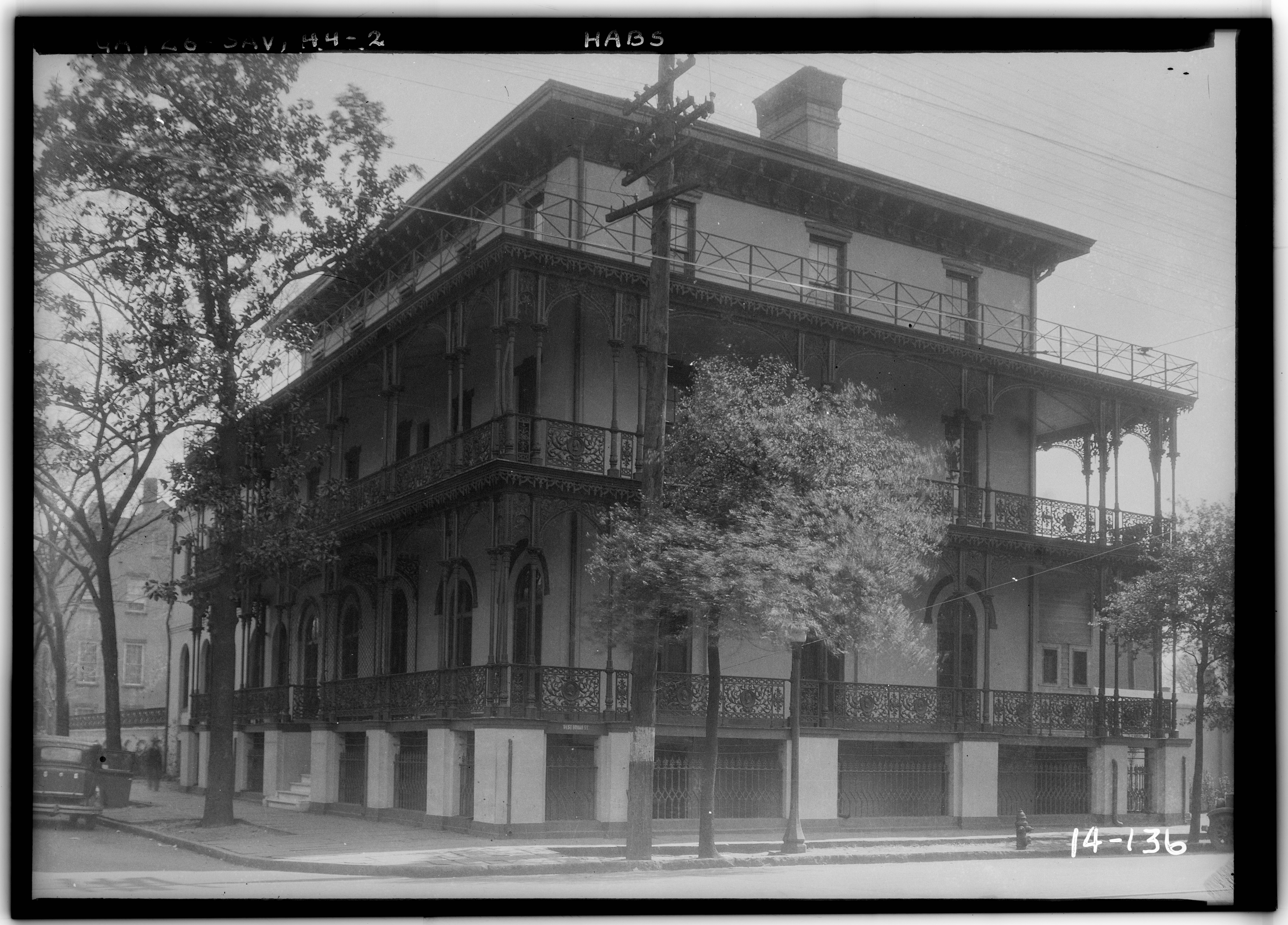
The now-demolished Wetter House stood at 425 West Oglethorpe Avenue from 1822 to 1950

- Downtowner Motor Inn, 201 West Oglethorpe Avenue (1964)
- Samuel Bryant House, 123 West Oglethorpe Avenue (1820; moved from across the street in the 1980s)
- Thomas Gardner–Jacob Henry Duplex, 115–117 West Oglethorpe Avenue (1820)
- 101 West Oglethorpe Avenue (1923)
- Samuel White Property, 14–18 West Oglethorpe Avenue (1899)
- 12 West Oglethorpe Avenue (1898)
- Anderson–Leslee House, 4 West Oglethorpe Avenue (1836)

The Wetter House formerly stood at 425 West Oglethorpe. It was demolished in 1950.

East Oglethorpe Avenue

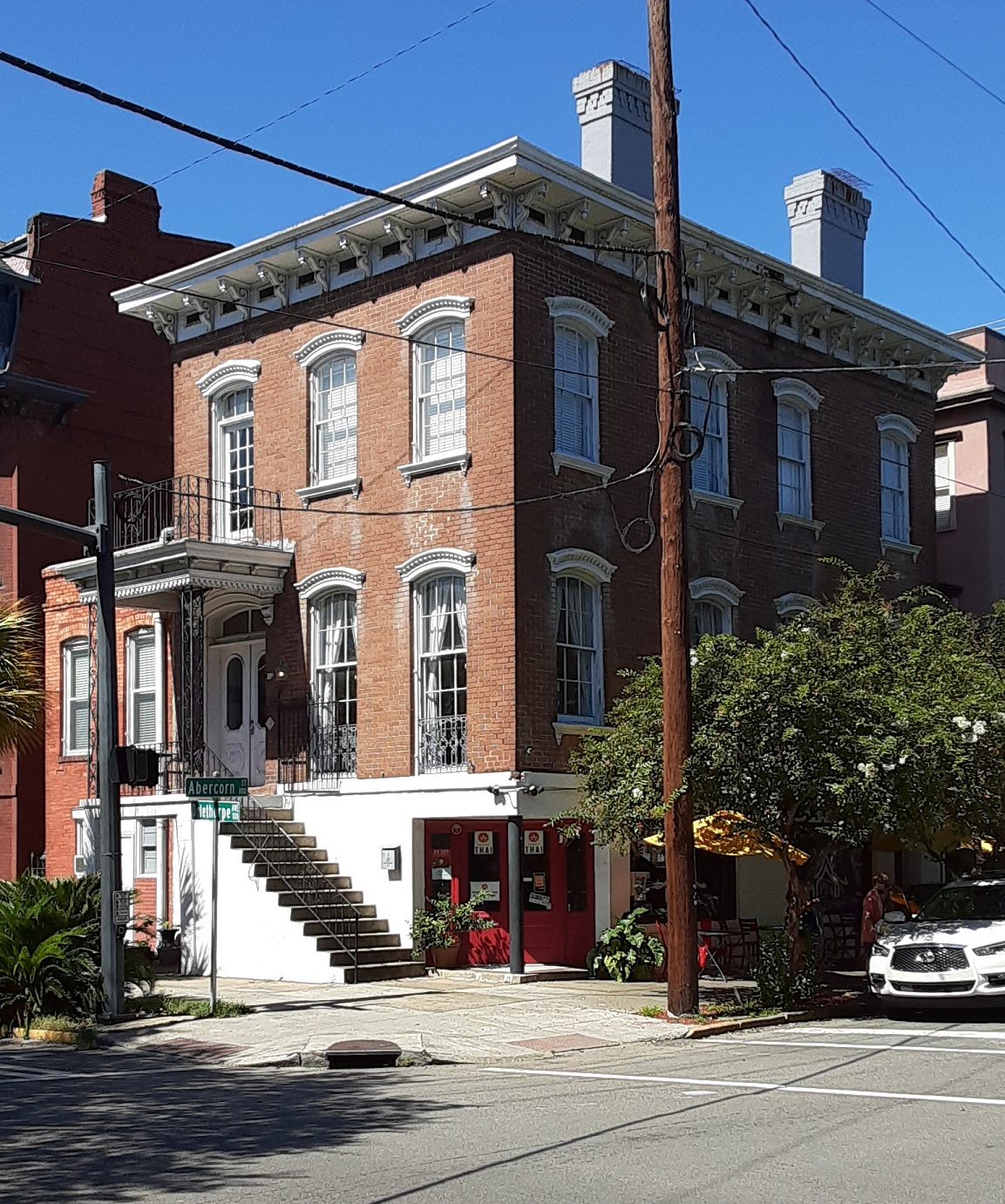
John Rowland Property, 132 East Oglethorpe Avenue

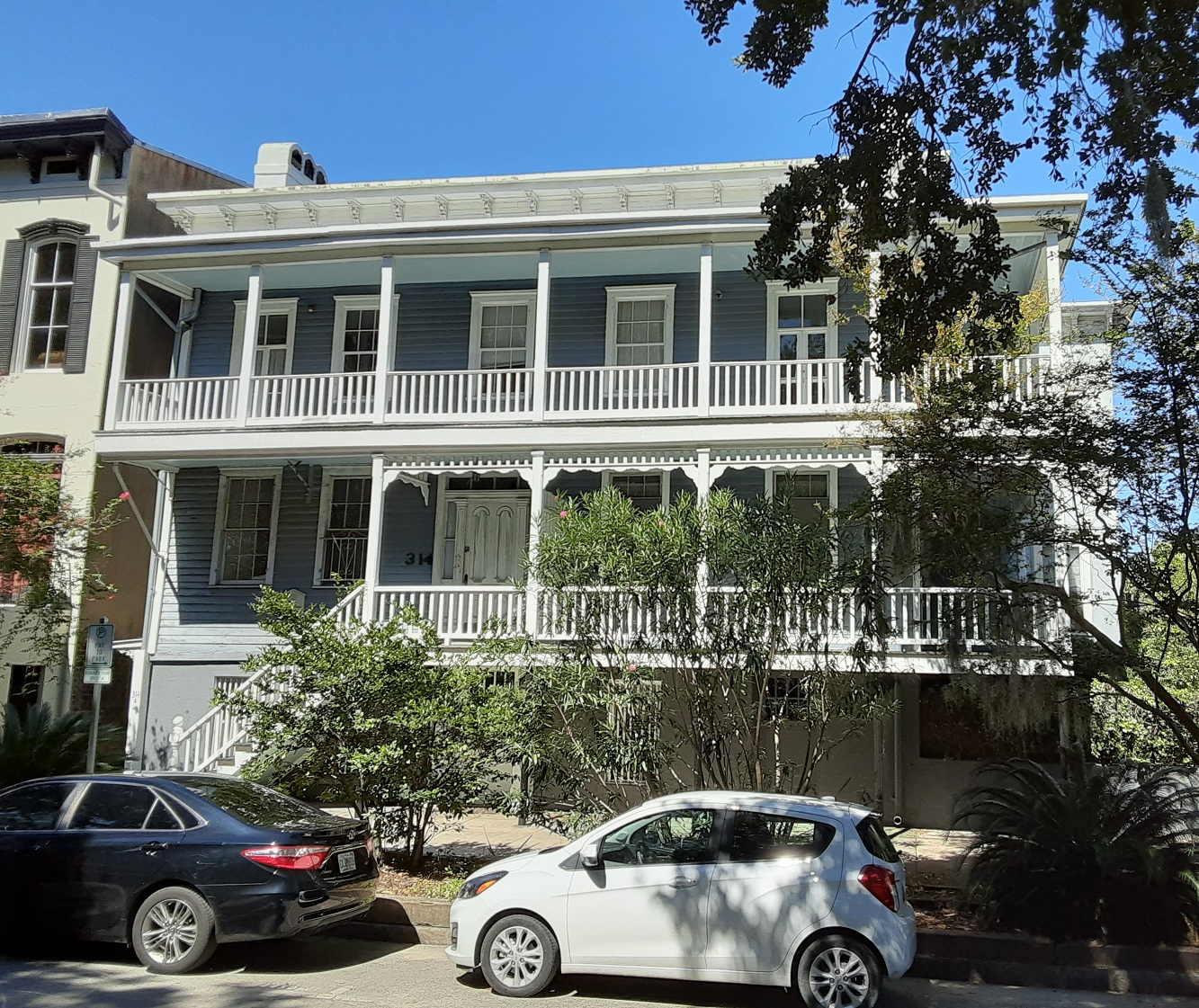
Thomas Rodman Property, 314 East Oglethorpe Avenue

- Wayne–Gordon House, 10 East Oglethorpe Avenue (1820; on the National Register of Historic Places)
- George Anderson House, 14 East Oglethorpe Avenue (1853)
- William Williams House, 18 East Oglethorpe Avenue (1826)
- John Hunter Duplex, 101–105 East Oglethorpe Avenue (1822)
- Thomas Clark–Matthew Lufburrow Duplex, 107–109 East Oglethorpe Avenue (1822)
- Eppinger House, 110 East Oglethorpe Avenue (circa 1776; possibly the oldest intact brick structure in the city)
- Anna Buntz House, 111 East Oglethorpe Avenue (1883)
- Marmaduke Hamilton Property, 112–114 East Oglethorpe Avenue (1872)
- John Haupt House, 113 East Oglethorpe Avenue (1819)
- John and Marmaduke Hamilton Property, 116 East Oglethorpe Avenue (1869)
- Savannah Fire Department, 121 East Oglethorpe Avenue (1937)
- Christian Camphor Cottage, 122 East Oglethorpe Avenue (1760–1767; possibly the oldest surviving building in the city)
- John Rowland Property (west), 124–126 East Oglethorpe Avenue (1895)
- John Rowland Property (east), 132 East Oglethorpe Avenue (1872)
- Henry Dickerson Row, 204–216 East Oglethorpe Avenue (1874)
- William Rahn House (Dr. Charlton House), 220–222 East Oglethorpe Avenue (1853)
- William Duncan House, 224 East Oglethorpe Avenue (1883)
- Oscar Dibble House, 228 East Oglethorpe Avenue (1855) – also the home of Conrad Aiken
- Mary Marshall Row, 230–244 East Oglethorpe Avenue (1856)
- John Ruwe Duplex, 310–312 East Oglethorpe Avenue (1875)
- Thomas Rodman Property, 314 East Oglethorpe Avenue (by 1809)
- William Spencer House, 322 East Oglethorpe Avenue (by 1809)
- City Police Barracks, 323 East Oglethorpe Avenue (1870)
- 506–508 East Oglethorpe Avenue (1890)
- 510–512 East Oglethorpe Avenue (1890)
- 514 East Oglethorpe Avenue (1891)
- John McAuliffe (Estate of) Property, 552 East Oglethorpe Avenue (1892)
