= Timeline of Savannah, Georgia =

List of historical events in Savannah, Georgia

Coordinates: 32.083333°N 81.083333°W

The following is a timeline of the history of Savannah, Georgia, United States.

== 18th century ==
- 1733
  - Savannah founded in British Colony of Georgia by James Oglethorpe.
  - Ellis, Johnson, Percival, and St. James Squares laid out per Oglethorpe Plan.
  - First City Market established.
- 1734
  - Reynolds Square laid out.
  - Solomon's Lodge (Masonic lodge) founded.
  - Pirates' House Inn established.
- 1735 – Congregation Mickve Israel formed.
- 1739
  - Wormsloe Plantation established.
  - October 5: Creek leader Tomochichi died. He is buried in Percival Square.
- 1740 – Bethesda Orphanage founded near town.
- 1742 – Oglethorpe Square laid out.
- 1750
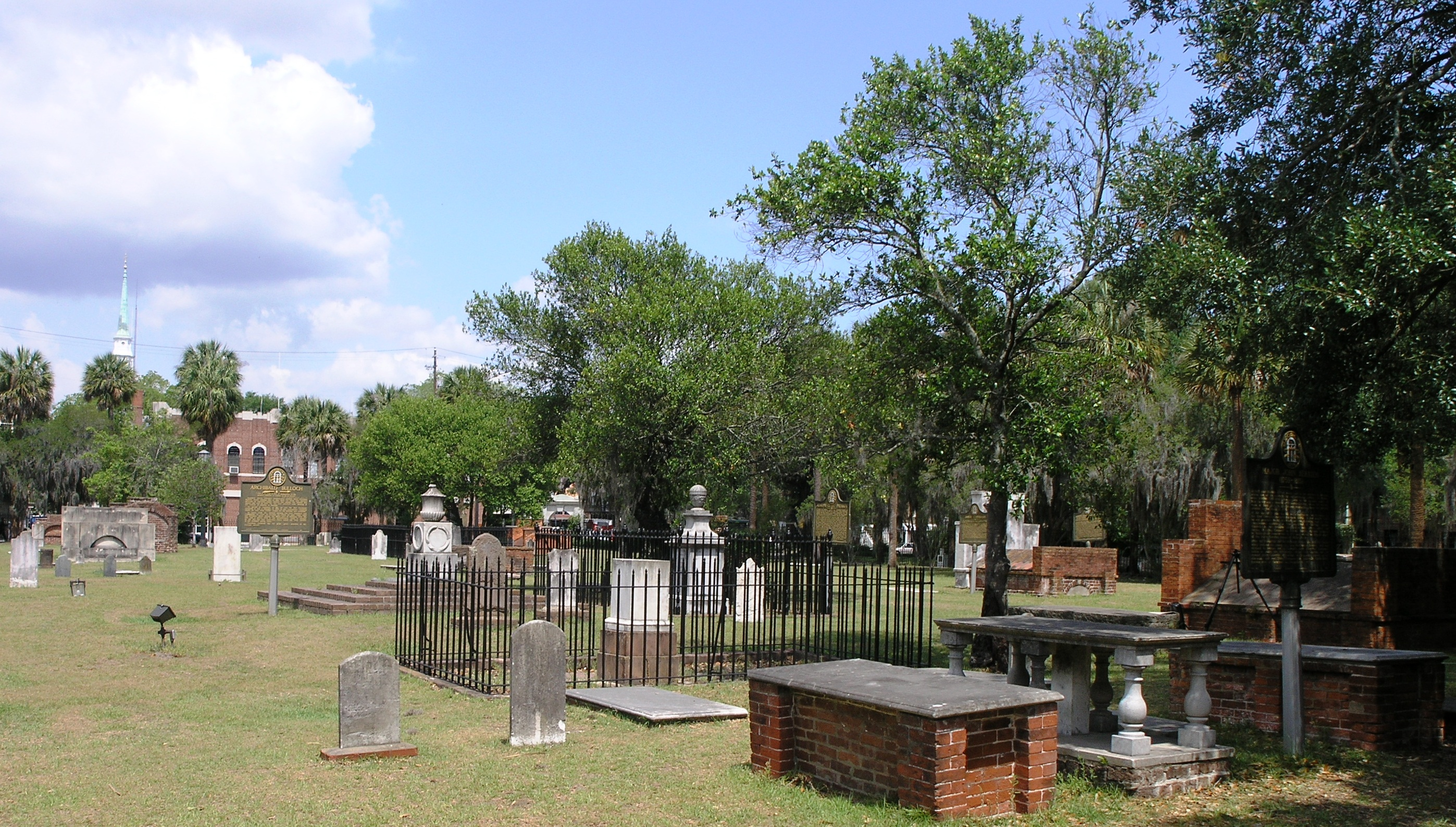
  - Colonial Park Cemetery was established in 1750
    Colonial Park Cemetery established.
  - Christ Church built.
  - Savannah Female Asylum founded.
- 1754
  - Savannah becomes capital of British Province of Georgia.
- 1755
  - January 1: Georgia legislature convenes.
  - Independent Presbyterian Church founded.
- 1762 – Bonaventure Plantation established.
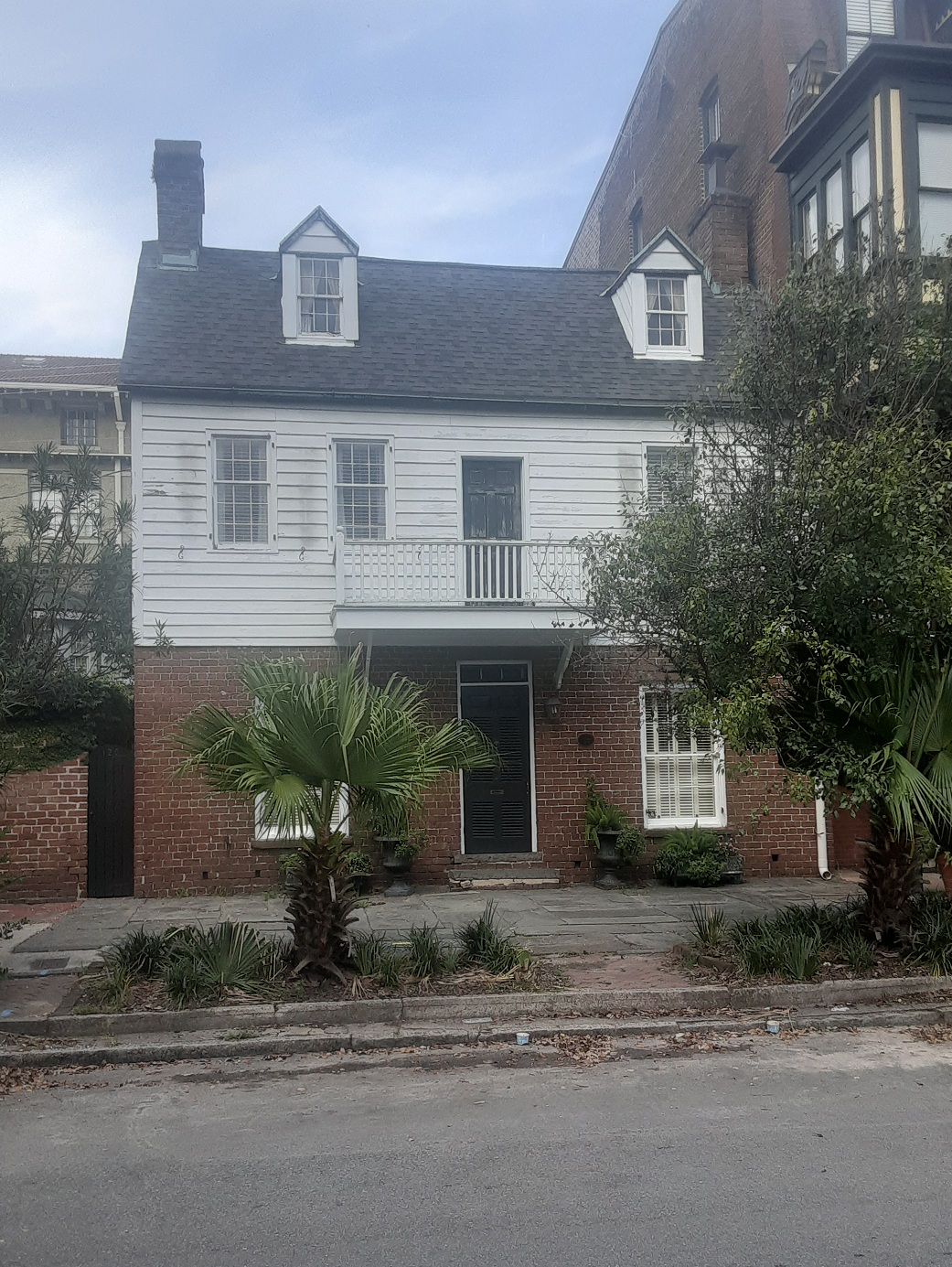
- The Christian Camphor Cottage, built in 1764 on today's East Oglethorpe Avenue, is believed to be the oldest extant structure in the city
  c. 1764 – The Christian Camphor Cottage was built. It is believed to be the city's oldest extant structure.
- 1765
  - Levi Sheftall Family Cemetery established.
  - Greenwich Plantation established.
- 1771 – Habersham House completed.
- 1773 – Mordecai Sheftall Cemetery established (possibly 1769).
- 1775
  - January: Provincial Congress held.
  - June: Committee of Safety organized at the liberty pole.
- 1776 (or before) – The Eppinger House was built. It is believed to be the oldest extant brick structure in the city.
- 1778
  - December 29: Battle of Savannah; British in power.
  - Georgia state capital relocated from Savannah to Augusta.
- 1779
  - Town Hall built.
  - Siege of Savannah.
- 1782
  - British occupation ends.
  - Georgia state capital relocated to Savannah from Augusta.
- 1786
  - Georgia state capital relocated again from Savannah to Augusta.
  - Chatham Artillery established.
- 1788
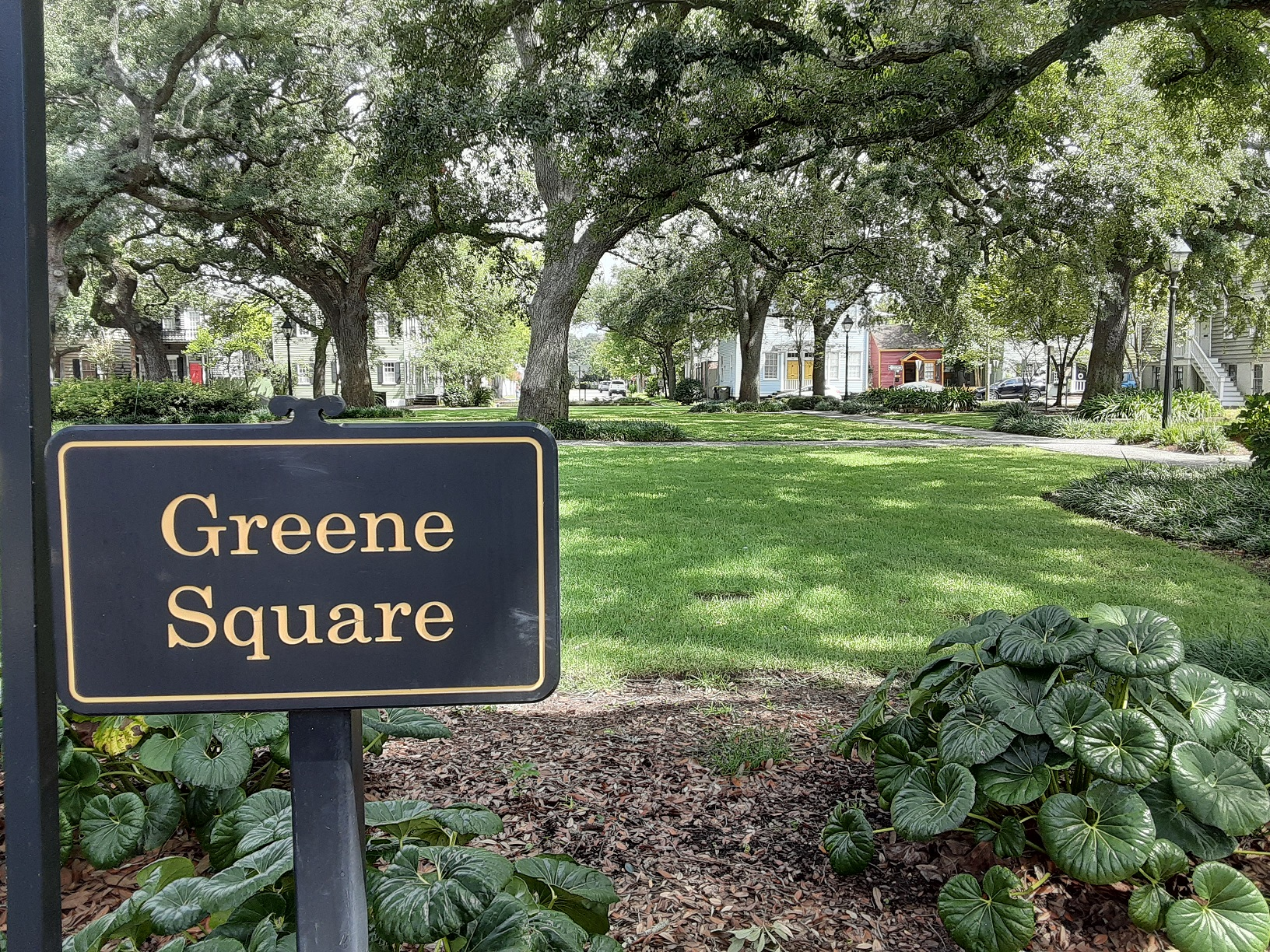
  - Greene Square was laid out in 1799
    Town becomes part of the U.S. state of Georgia.
  - African Baptist Church and Chatham Academy established.
- 1789 – Savannah chartered as a city.
- 1790
  - John Houstoun becomes mayor.
  - Franklin Square and Washington Square laid out
- 1791 – Warren Square laid out.
- 1796 – November 26: Fire.
- 1799 – City Exchange constructed, replacing one that burned in 1796. Columbia Square and Greene Square laid out.

== 19th century ==
- 1800 – Population: 5,146.
- 1802 – Savannah Volunteer Guards established.
- 1804
  - Seamen's Hospital opens.
  - Bonaventure Plantation destroyed by fire.
  - Lebanon Plantation established.
- 1809 – Savannah Society Library founded.
- 1810 – Population: 5,315.
- 1812 – Hibernian Society organized.
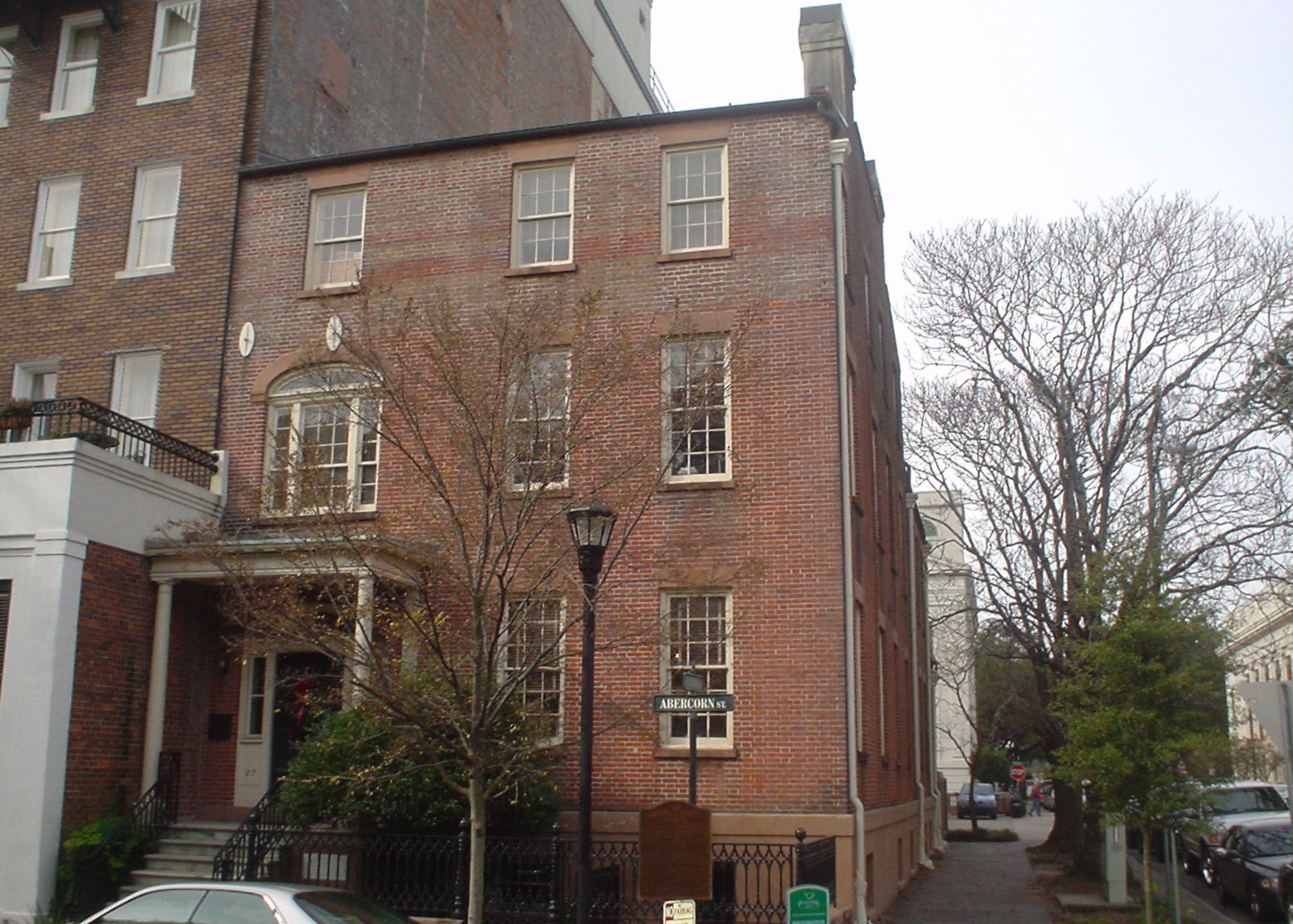
- Oliver Sturges House, built in 1813
  1813 – Oliver Sturges House built.
- 1815 – Orleans Square and Chippewa Square laid out.
- 1817 – Savannah Steamboat Company in business.
- 1818
  - Telfair Academy built.
  - The Savannah Theatre established.
- 1819
  - May: Steamboat Savannah travels to Liverpool, England.
  - May: U.S. President Monroe visits town.
  - William Scarbrough House (residence) built.
  - Owens–Thomas House (residence built).
- 1820
  - January: Great Savannah Fire of 1820.
  - Isaiah Davenport House built.
- 1821
  - The city's first hotel, City Hotel, is completed.
  - Second iteration of City Market built.
- 1824 – Savannah Fire Company formed.
- 1825 – March: Lafayette visits town.
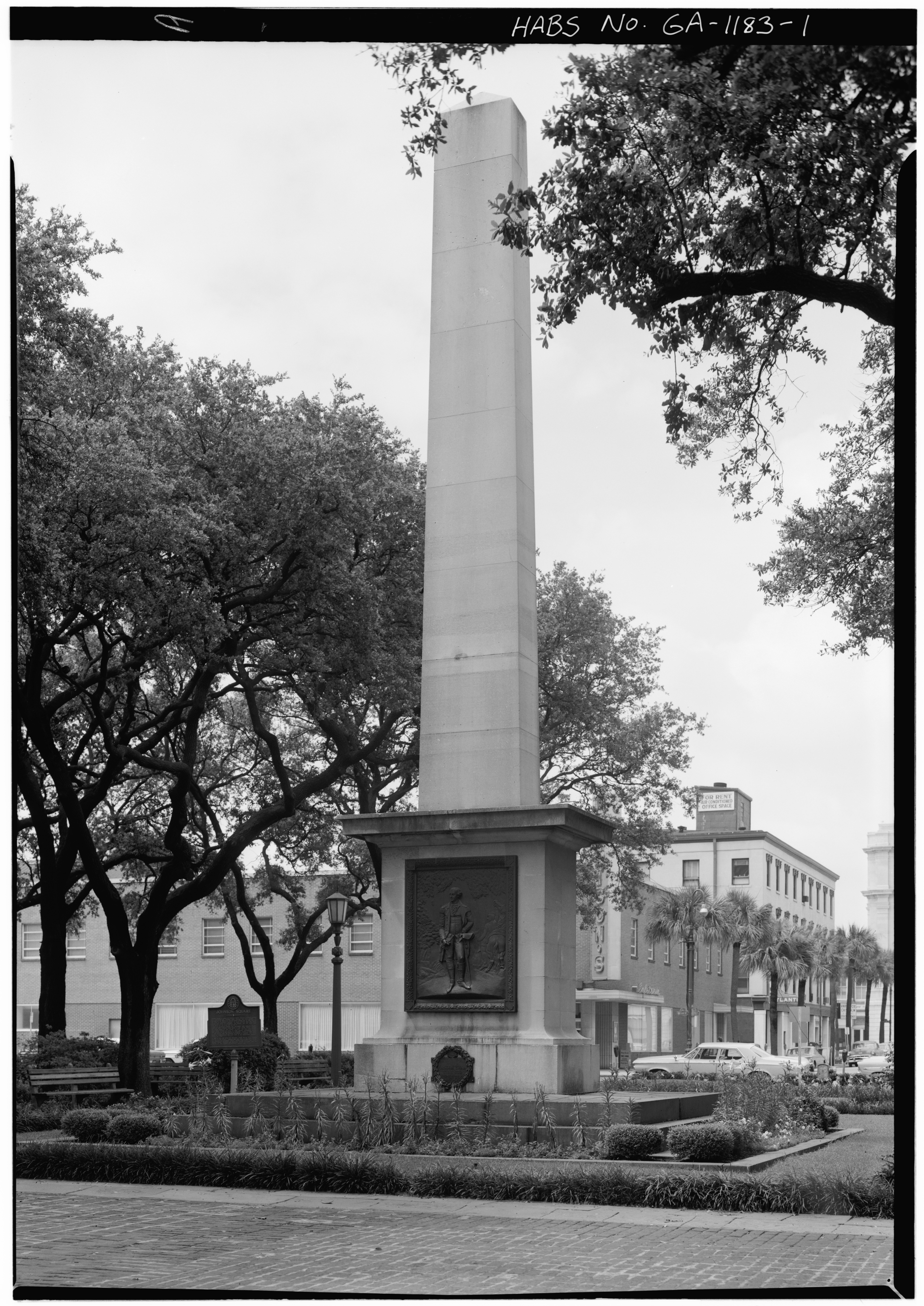
- The Nathanael Greene Monument was erected in Johnson Square in 1830
  1830
  - Nathanael Greene Monument in Johnson Square completed.
  - Population: 7,303.
- 1831 – Savannah–Ogeechee Canal constructed.
- 1833 – First Baptist Church built.
- 1834 – Oglethorpe Barracks built (approximate date).
- 1837
  - Pulaski Square, Lafayette Square, Madison Square and Troup Square laid out.
  - Central of Georgia Railroad begins operating.
- 1839 – Georgia Historical Society organized.
- 1840
  - Sorrel–Weed House built.
  - Population: 11,214.
- 1841 – Crawford Square laid out.
- 1842 – Convent of St. Vincent de Paul founded.
- 1844 – Savannah Institution for Savings instituted.
- 1846 – Bonaventure Cemetery established near town.
- 1847
  - Chatham Square and Monterey Square laid out.
  - Fort Pulaski built near town.
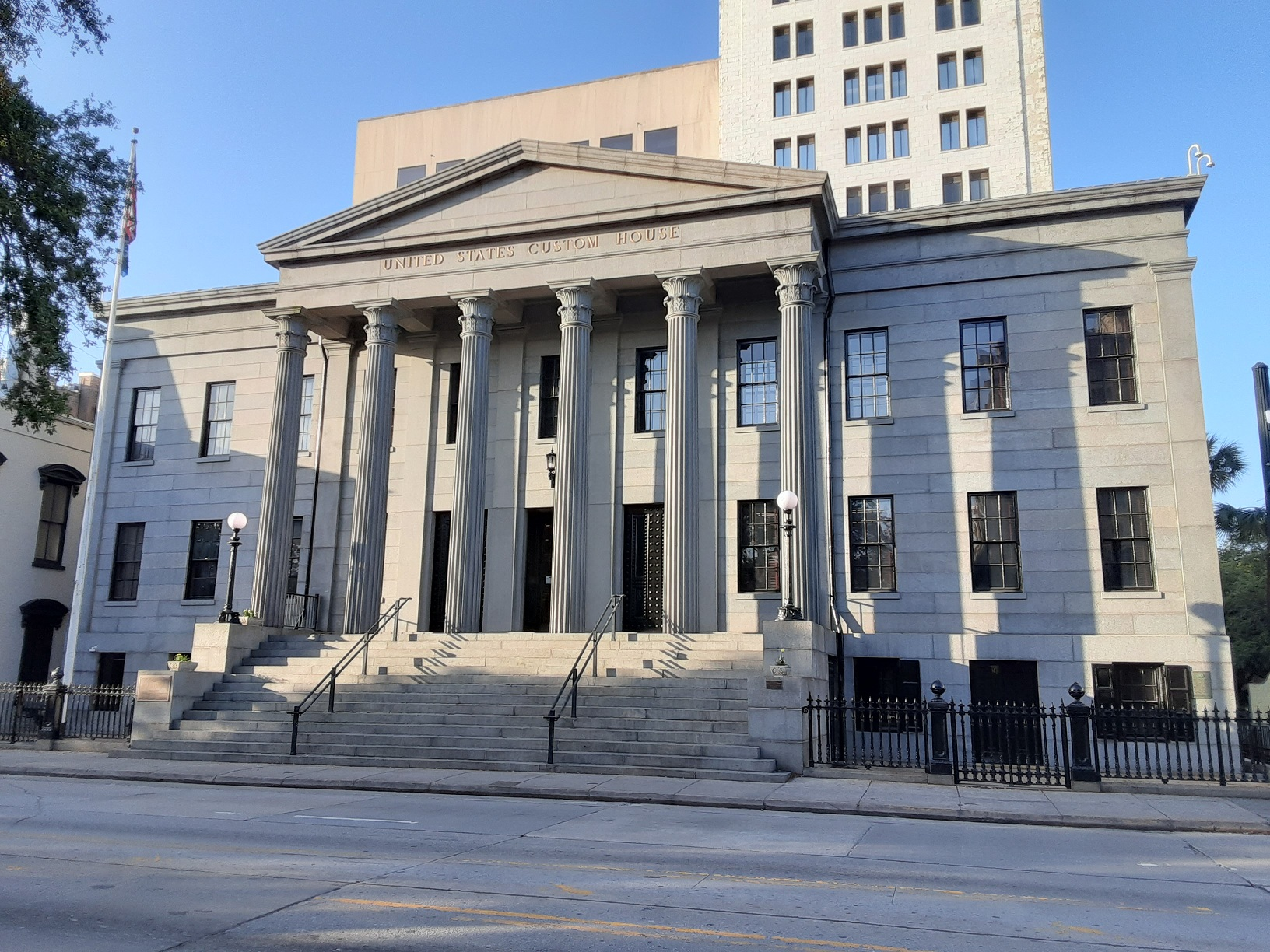
- The United States Customhouse was built in Bay Street in 1848
  1848
  - Customhouse built.
  - Population: 13,573.
- 1850
  - Daily Morning News begins publication.
- 1851
  - Calhoun Square and Whitefield Square laid out.
  - The Marshall House opens.
- 1853
  - Forsyth Place (park) laid out.
  - Catholic Diocese of Savannah and Laurel Grove Cemetery established.
  - St. John's Church consecrated.
  - Green–Meldrim House built.
  - Georgia State Railroad Museum built.
- 1854
  - Yellow fever outbreak.
  - Central of Georgia Railway Company Shop Property built.
  - Augusta and Savannah Railroad in operation (approximate date).
- 1855 – Young Men's Literary Association organized.
- 1858 – Old Harbor Light erected.
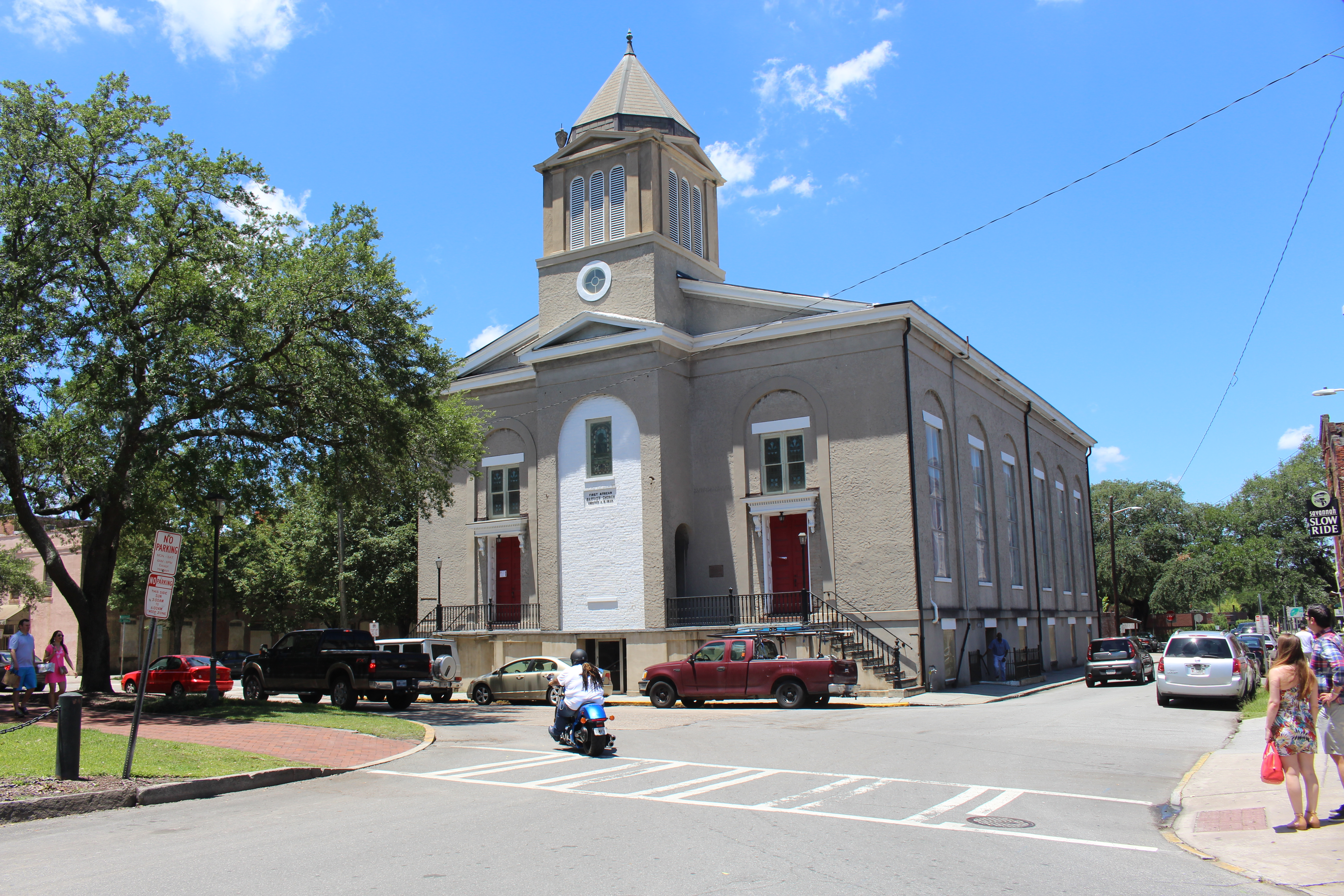
- First African Baptist Church was built in 1859
  1859
  - First African Baptist Church rebuilt.
  - The Great Slave Auction at Ten Broeck Race Course, March 2 & 3.
  - John G. Lawton riverboat explodes, June 9
- 1860 – Central of Georgia Depot and Trainshed built.
- 1861
  - March 21: Cornerstone Speech by Alexander H. Stephens.
  - Port blockaded by U.S. government.
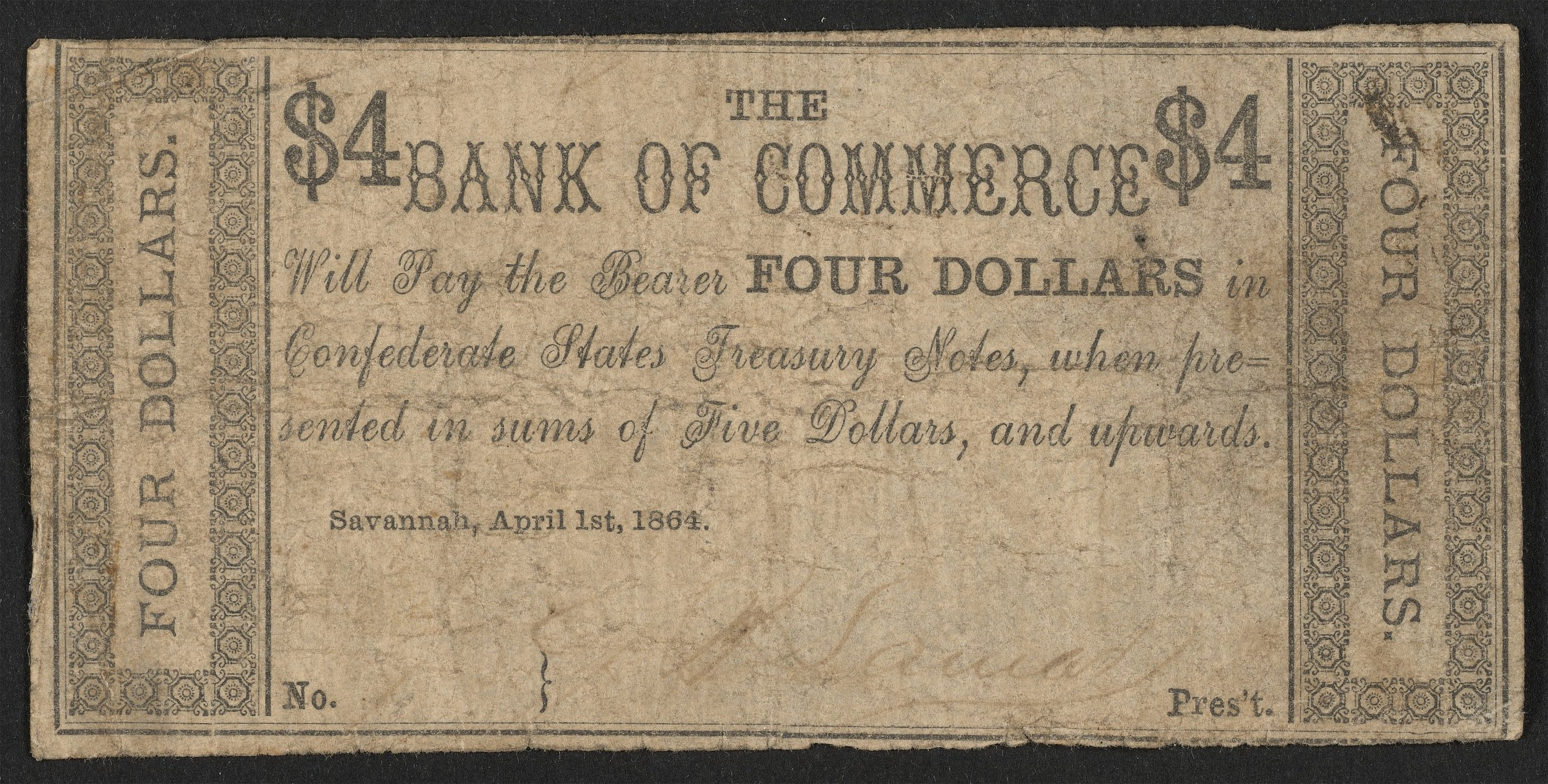
  - 4 dollar banknote from the Bank of Commerce in Savannah, Georgia, 1864.
    Green House (residence) built.
- 1864 – December 22: Savannah taken by Union forces.
- 1866 – City board of education incorporated.
- 1867 – Beach Institute established.
- 1868 – Mercer House (residence) built (approximate date).
- 1870 – McCarthy's Business College established.
- 1871 – Abend Zeitung newspaper begins publication.
- 1873 – First Bryan Baptist Church rebuilt.
- 1874 – Youth's Historical Society founded.
- 1875
  - Civil War Memorial in Forsyth Park dedicated.
  - Colored Tribune newspaper begins publication.
  - Savannah Rifle Association established.
- 1876
  - Cathedral of St. John the Baptist dedicated.
  - Third iteration of City Market built.
  - Another yellow fever outbreak (see also J. W. Schull)
- 1878 – Congregation Mickve Israel synagogue built.
- 1879 – City boundaries expanded.
- 1880
  - Confederate memorial built in Forsyth Park.
  - Population: 30,709.
- 1882 – Ford Dramatic Association incorporated.
- 1883
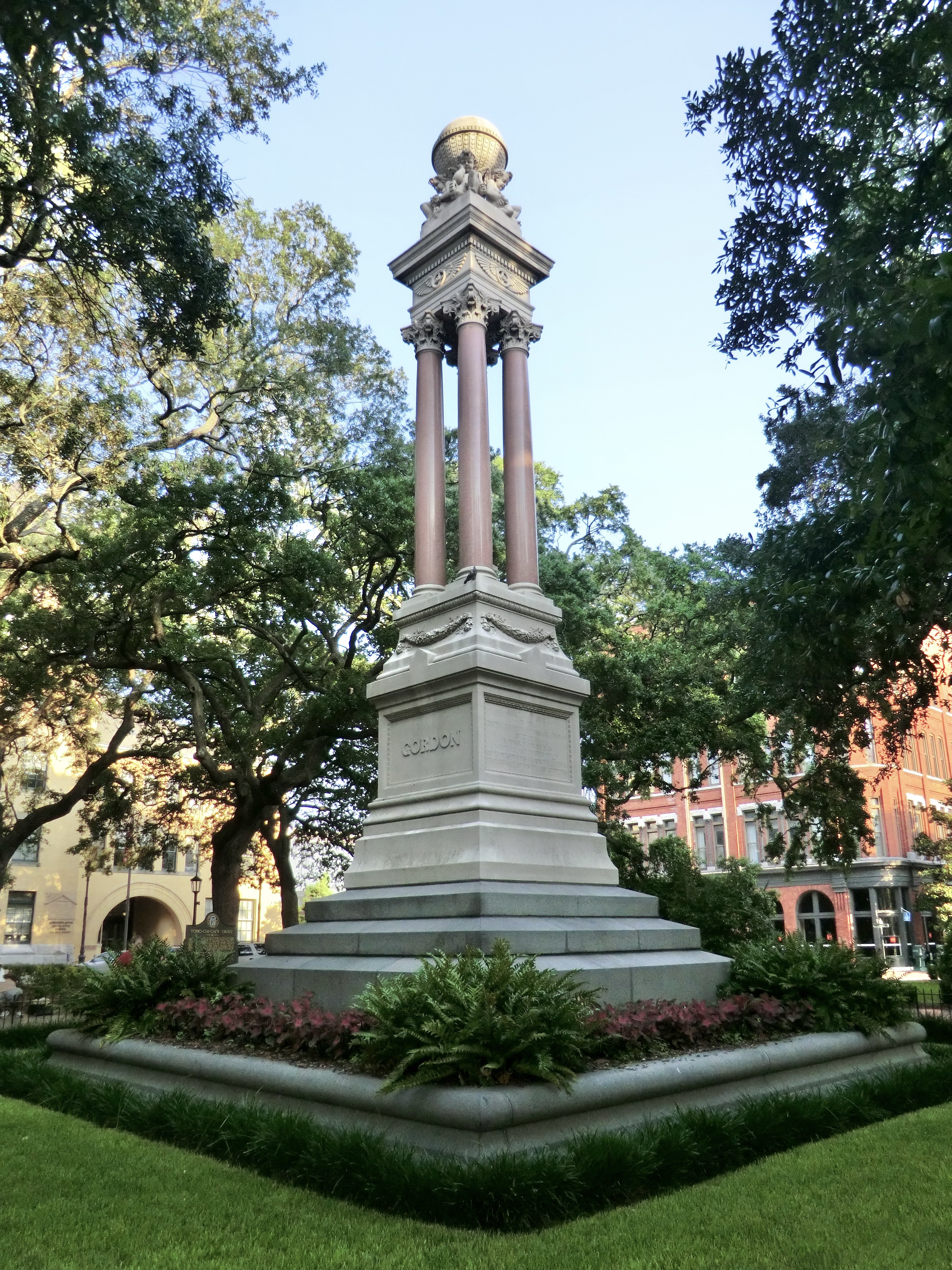
  - The William Washington Gordon Monument erected in Wright Square in 1883
    City boundaries expanded.
  - William Washington Gordon Monument in Wright Square completed.
- 1886 – Telfair Academy of Arts and Sciences opens.
- 1887
  - Savannah Cotton Exchange building built.
  - Tybee-Savannah railway built.
- 1888 – William Jasper Monument in Madison Square dedicated.
- 1890 – Population: 43,189.
- 1891 – Georgia Industrial College established.
- 1893 – August: Sea Islands hurricane.
- 1898 - Fire at the Cathedral of St. John the Baptist.
- 1899
  - Kate Baldwin Free Kindergarten established.
  - Federal Building and U.S. Courthouse built.
- 1900
  - Population: 54,244.
  - Great Dane Trailers founded as the Savannah Blowpipe Company

== 20th century ==
- 1901
  - City boundaries expanded.
  - Hill Hall at Savannah State College built.
- 1902
  - Benedictine College founded.
  - Savannah Union Station completed.
- 1904 – City Exchange demolished.
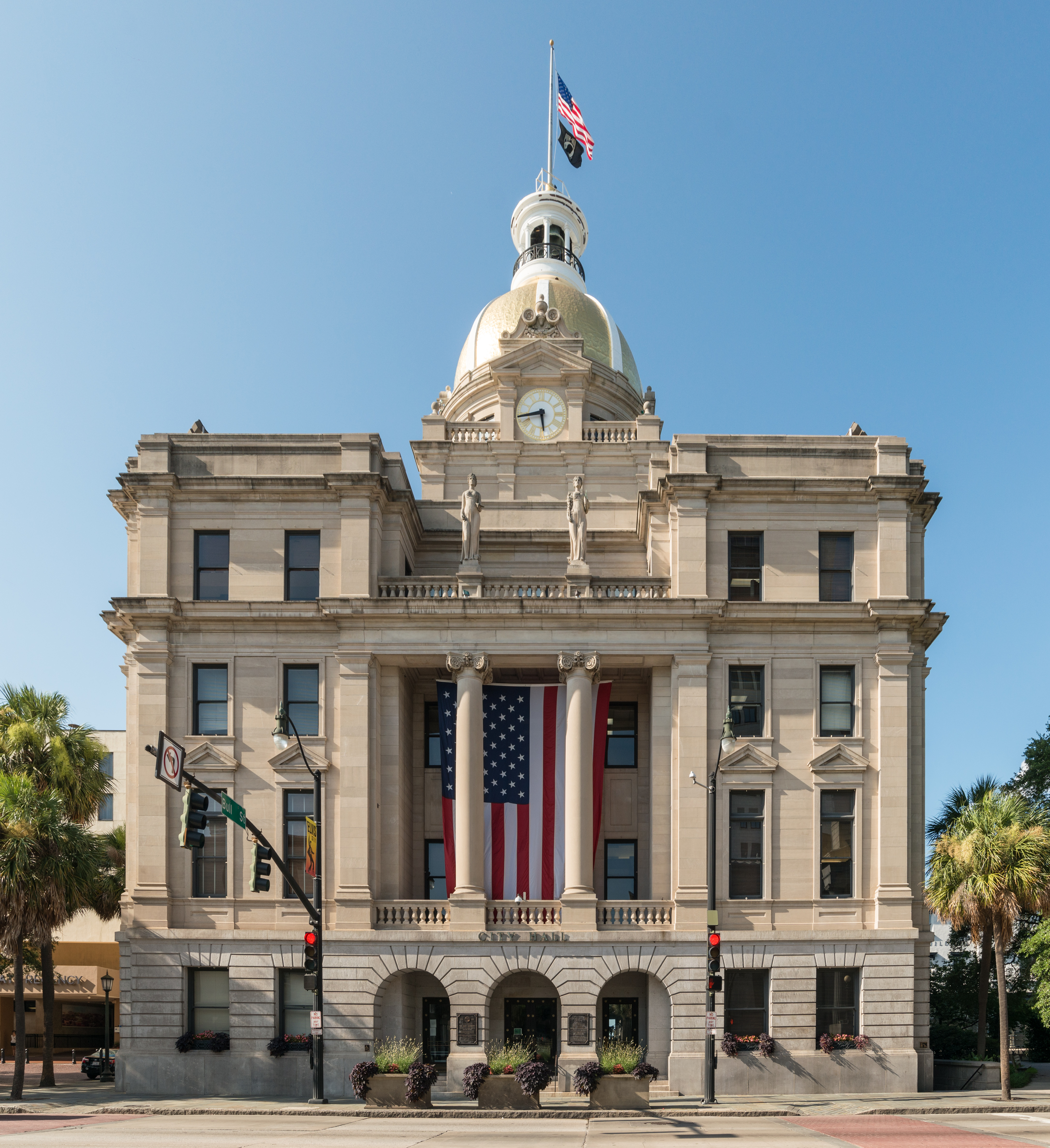
- Savannah City Hall was built on Bay Street, at the head of Bull Street, in 1904
  1906 – Savannah City Hall built.
- 1908 – Savannah, Augusta and Northern Railway in operation (approximate date).
- 1909 – December: Savannah axe murders
- 1910
  - James Oglethorpe Monument in Chippewa Square dedicated.
  - Population: 65,064.
- 1912 – Girl Guides of America founded.
- 1914 – East Henry Street Carnegie Library opens.
- 1919
  - Armstrong House completed.
  - April: Savannah Centennial Pageant performed.
- 1920 – Population: 83,252.
- 1921 – Lucas Theatre built
- 1925 – Savannah Economic Development Authority established.
- 1926 – Municipal Stadium built.
- 1929
  - WTOC radio begins broadcasting.
  - Savannah Municipal Airport begins operating.
  - Savannah Technical College established.
- 1933 – Greenwich Cemetery established.
- 1935
  - Armstrong Junior College founded.
  - Union Bag and Paper opens mill.
- 1938 – Atlantic Greyhound Bus Terminal built.
- 1939 – WSAV radio begins broadcasting.
- 1940 – Coastal Transitional Center opened.
- 1942 – U.S. Army Chatham Field (airfield) active.
- 1950 – Little Theatre of Savannah founded.
- 1951 – Palm Drive-In movie theatre opens.
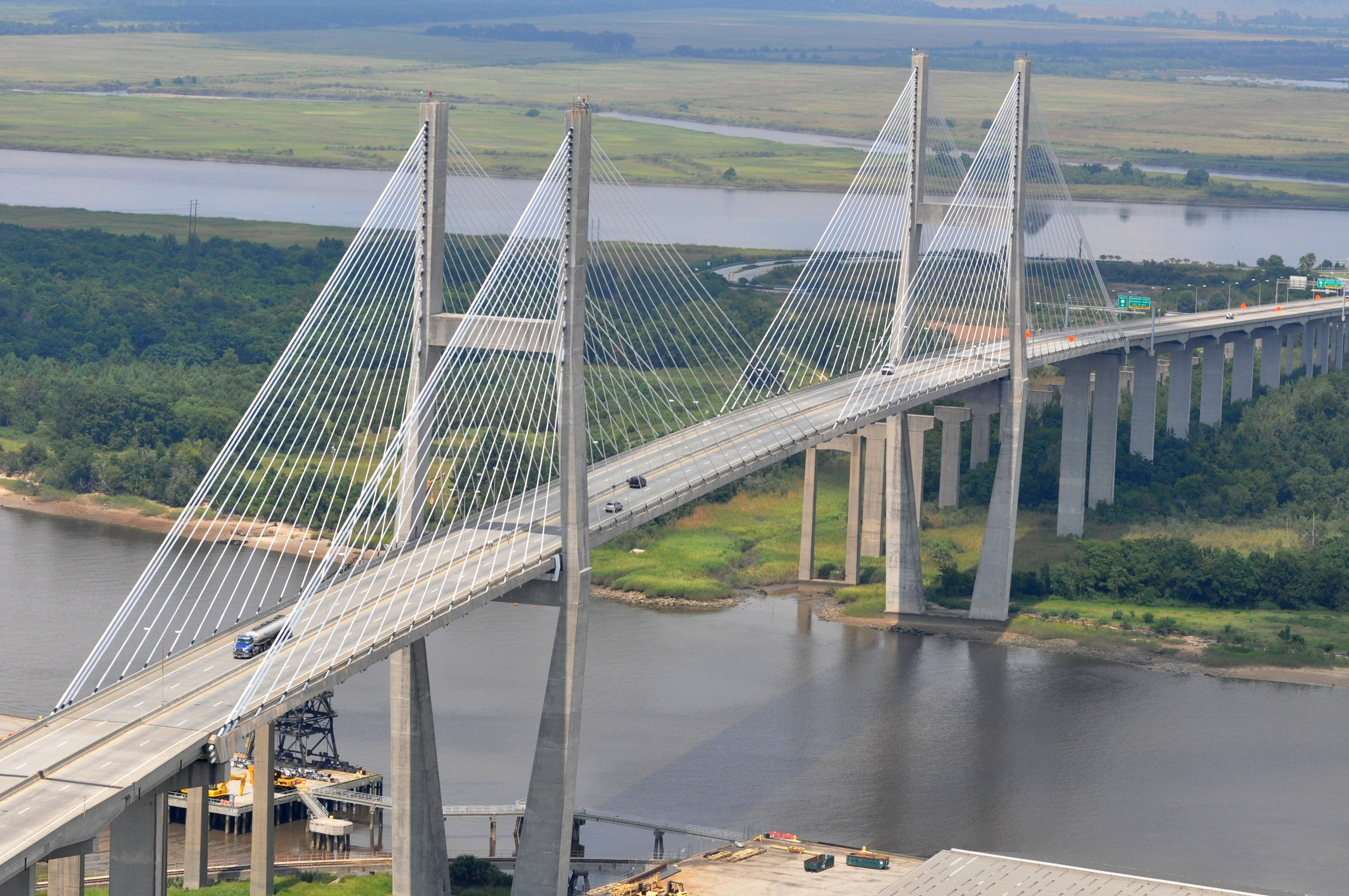
- Talmadge Memorial Bridge was completed in 1953
  1953 – Talmadge Memorial Bridge built to Hutchinson Island.
- 1954
  - Council–manager form of government adopted.
  - WTOC-TV (television) begins broadcasting.
  - City Market torn down; replaced by Ellis Square parking garage
- 1955 – Historic Savannah Foundation organized.
- 1956
  - WSAV-TV (television) begins broadcasting.
  - Juliette Gordon Low house museum opens.
- 1960
  - Savannah Protest Movement commenced
  - Travis Field airport terminal built.
  - Population: 147,537.
- 1962 – Savannah station built.
- 1963 – Savannah Union Station demolished.
- 1967 – Grumman Aircraft Engineering Co. opens Savannah office.
- 1968
  - The DeSoto Hotel opens.
  - Abercorn Plaza shopping centre opens for business.
- 1969 – Oglethorpe Mall opens up for business.
- 1970
  - John Rousakis becomes mayor.
  - Population: 118,349.
- 1974 – Savannah Civic Center opens.
- 1976 – Abercorn Cinema opens.
- 1977 – City Records Committee established.
- 1978 – Savannah College of Art and Design founded.
- 1979 – September: Hurricane David makes landfall.
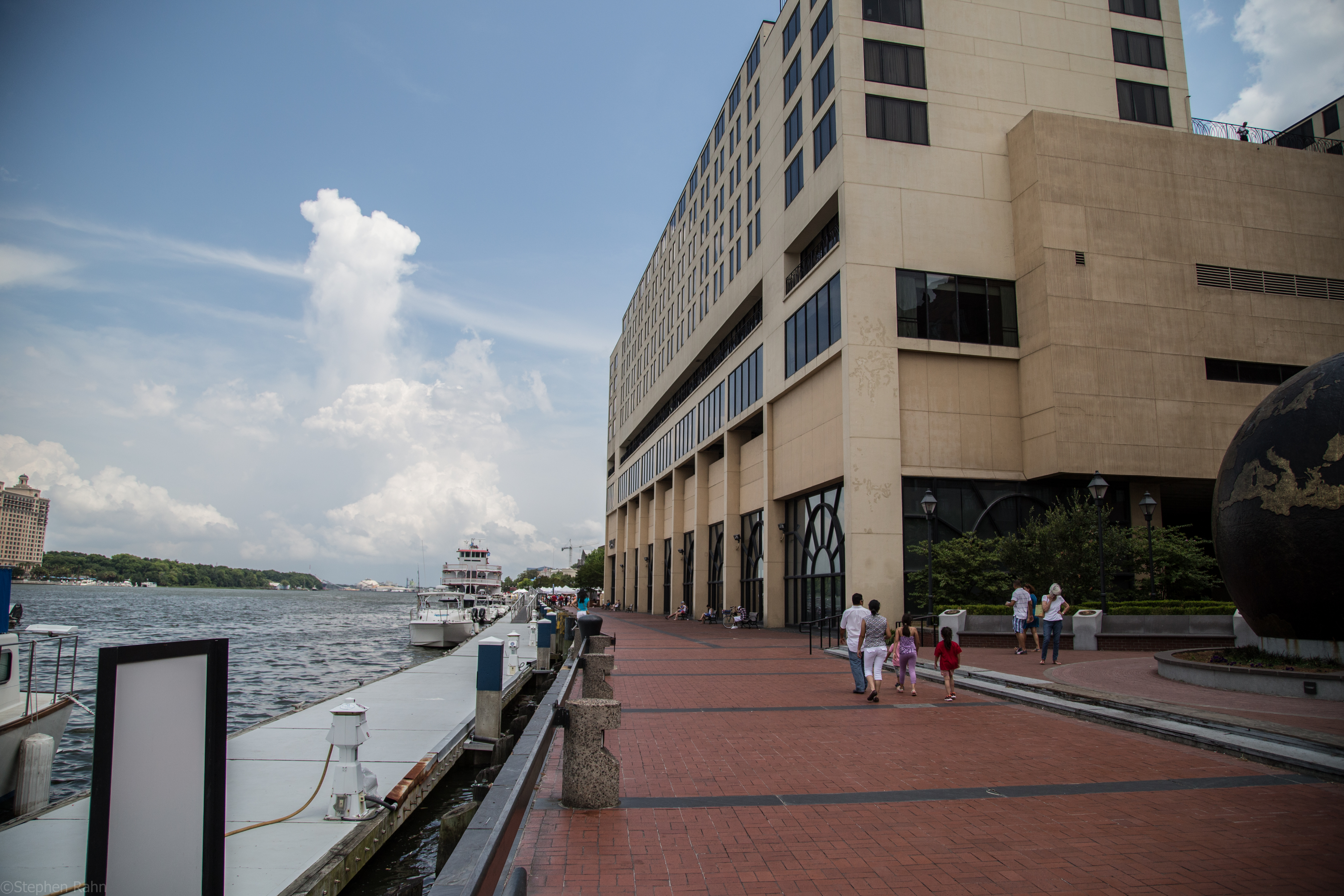
- The Hyatt Regency Savannah was built between Bay Street and River Street in 1980
  1980
  - Hyatt Regency Savannah opens.
- 1981
  - Coastal State Prison built.
  - May 2: The shooting of Danny Hansford occurs at Mercer House, the basis of Midnight in the Garden of Good and Evil
- 1986 – Chatham Area Transit established.
- 1988 – Savannah Music Festival founded.
- 1990
  - Savannah Mall (the city's second shopping mall) in business.
  - Talmadge Memorial Bridge rebuilt.
- 1991
  - Vietnam Veterans Memorial built in Emmet Park.
  - Lady & Sons restaurant in business.
- 1994
  - Savannah/Hilton Head International Airport terminal built.
  - Bestseller book about Savannah Midnight in the Garden of Good and Evil published.
- 1998
  - Savannah Arts Academy established.
  - Floyd Adams becomes the first African American to become the Mayor of the City of Savannah.
- 1999
  - Georgia Tech Savannah established.
  - City website online (approximate date).

== 21st century ==
- 2000 – Lucas Theatre renovated.
- 2002
  - African-American Monument on River Street dedicated.
  - Islamic Center of Savannah established.
- 2004 – Otis Johnson becomes mayor.
- 2005
  - Abercorn Walk shopping center in business.
  - Savannah-Chatham Metro Police established.
- 2009 – The Savannah Philharmonic Orchestra is established.
- 2010 – Population: 136,286.
- 2012
  - Edna Jackson becomes mayor.
  - Savannah Law School established.
- 2016
  - Eddie Deloach becomes mayor, first Republican since 1996.
  - All of Savannah and Chatham county east of I95 was evacuated ahead of Hurricane Matthew.
- 2017 – All of Savannah and Chatham County east of I95 evacuated due to the impact of Hurricane Irma.
- 2018
  - Savannah Law School closed.
  - City and county police merger ends, separating the two agencies.
  - Roy Minter sworn in as new police chief of Savannah Police Department.
- 2020 – Van R. Johnson becomes the 67th mayor.
- 2022 – Population: 147,780 (+11,494 since 2010)

== See also ==
- History of Savannah, Georgia
- List of mayors of Savannah, Georgia
- Timelines of other cities in Georgia: Athens, Atlanta, Augusta, Columbus, Macon

== Bibliography ==
=== Published in 18th–19th century ===
- Jedidiah Morse (1797), "Savannah", American Gazetteer, Boston: S. Hall, and Thomas & Andrews
- John Melish (1818), "Savannah", Travels through the United States of America, in the years 1806 & 1807, and 1809, 1810, & 1811, Belfast: Reprinted by Jos. Smyth
- "Savannah", The North American Tourist, New York: A.T. Goodrich, 1839
- Joseph Bancroft, ed. (1848). Census of the City of Savannah...to Which is Added a Commercial Directory (2nd ed.). E. J. Purse, printer – via HathiTrust.
- "Great Cities of the United States: Savannah, Georgia", De Bow's Review, vol. 17, pp. 30 v, September 1854, hdl:2027/njp.32101065216861
- Thomas Baldwin; J. Thomas (1854). "Savannah". New and Complete Gazetteer of the United States. Philadelphia: Lippincott, Grambo & Co.
- R.H. Long (1863), "Savannah", Hunt's Gazetteer of the Border and Southern States, Pittsburgh, Pa.: John P. Hunt
- F.D. Lee; J.L. Agnew (1869), Historical record of the city of Savannah, Savannah: J.H. Estill, OL 7125369M
- Charles H. Jones (1873), "Savannah", Appletons' Hand-book of American Travel: the Southern Tour, New York: D. Appleton & Co.
- B.H. Richardson (1875), Pleasure Guide for Northern Tourists and Invalids: Sketch of the Resorts on Savannah, Skidaway & Seaboard Railroad, Savannah, OL 23367197M
- Atlantic and Gulf Railroad (1879), "Savannah", Guide to Southern Georgia and Florida (5th ed.), Savannah, Ga., OCLC 1805741
- Directory of the City of Savannah. A.E. Sholes. 1880 – via HathiTrust.
  - 1881
  - Sholes' Directory of the City of Savannah. 1882 – via Google Books.
  - 1884
  - 1896
- A guide to strangers visiting Savannah for business, health, or pleasure, Savannah, Ga.: J.H. Estill, 1881, OCLC 15086225, OL 6904259M
- Savannah: her trade, commerce and industries, 1883-4, Savannah: Jno. E. Land, 1884, OL 23368885M
- "Savannah" . Encyclopædia Britannica. Vol. 21 (9th ed.). 1886.
- Adelaide Wilson (1889), Historic and Picturesque Savannah, Boston: Boston Photogravure Co., OCLC 003846336, OL 25126895M
- Charles C. Jones Jr. (1890), History of Savannah, Ga., Syracuse, N.Y.: D. Mason & Co.
- Savannah. Ocean Steamship Co. of Savannah. 1899.
- "Savannah", Rand, McNally & Co.'s Handy Guide to the Southeastern States, Chicago: Rand, McNally & Co., 1899 – via Internet Archive
- "Savannah", Reunion, Georgia Division, U.C.V.: Official programme and guide book, Savannah, Ga., 1899, OCLC 5242393

=== Published in 20th century ===
1900s–1950s

- Savannah. 1904.
- F.H. Richardson (1905). "Savannah, Ga.". Richardson's Southern Guide. Chicago: Monarch Book Company – via Internet Archive.
- "Savannah, Georgia, a Leader of the New South", National Magazine, Boston: Chapple Publishing Co., 1905
- A.H. MacDonell (1907), Code of the City of Savannah of 1907
- "Savannah", United States (4th ed.), Leipzig: K. Baedeker, 1909, OCLC 02338437
- "Savannah" . Encyclopædia Britannica. Vol. 24 (11th ed.). 1910. pp. 240–241.
- Maude Heyward; Elizabeth V. McLaws (1910), Illustrated guide to Savannah, Savannah, OL 23412048M
- William Harden (1913), History of Savannah and South Georgia, Chicago: Lewis Publishing Company
- Federal Writers' Project (1937), Savannah, American Guide Series, Savannah

1950s–1990s

- Alexander A. Lawrence, A Present for Mr. Lincoln: The Story of Savannah from Secession to Sherman (Macon, Ga.: Ardivan Press, 1961).
- Ory Mazar Nergal, ed. (1980), "Savannah", Encyclopedia of American Cities, New York: E.P. Dutton, OL 4120668M
- Preston Russell and Barbara Hines, Savannah: A History of Her People since 1733 (Savannah, Ga.: Frederic C. Beil, 1992).
- "Monuments and Fountains of Savannah", Historical Documents & Research, City of Savannah, Research Library & Municipal Archives, 1993
- Trudy Ring and Robert M. Salkin, ed. (1995). "Savannah". Americas. International Dictionary of Historic Places. Routledge. p. 650+. ISBN 978-1-134-25930-4.
- Whittington B. Johnson, Black Savannah, 1788-1864 (Fayetteville: University of Arkansas Press, 1996).
- Derek Smith, Civil War Savannah (Savannah, Ga.: Frederic C. Beil, 1997).
- Patrick Allen, ed., Literary Savannah (Athens, Ga.: Hill Street Press, 1998).
- "The South: Georgia: Savannah", USA, Let's Go, New York: St. Martin's Press, 1999, OL 24937240M

=== Published in 21st century ===
- Mills B. Lane, Savannah Revisited: History and Architecture, 5th ed. (Savannah, Ga.: Beehive Press, 2001).
- Charles J. Elmore (2002). Savannah, Georgia. Black America. Charleston, South Carolina: Arcadia.
- Walter J. Fraser Jr., Savannah in the Old South (Athens: University of Georgia Press, 2003).
- Research Library & Municipal Archives (2006), "Century of History: Savannah City Hall Centennial, 1906-2006 (timeline)", Historical Documents & Research, City of Savannah
- Jacqueline Jones, Saving Savannah: The City and the Civil War (New York: Knopf, 2008).
- Kwesi DeGraft-Hanson (2010). "Unearthing the Weeping Time: Savannah's Ten Broeck Race Course and 1859 Slave Sale". Southern Spaces. doi:10.18737/M76K6J.
