= Boston Photogravure Company =

American publisher

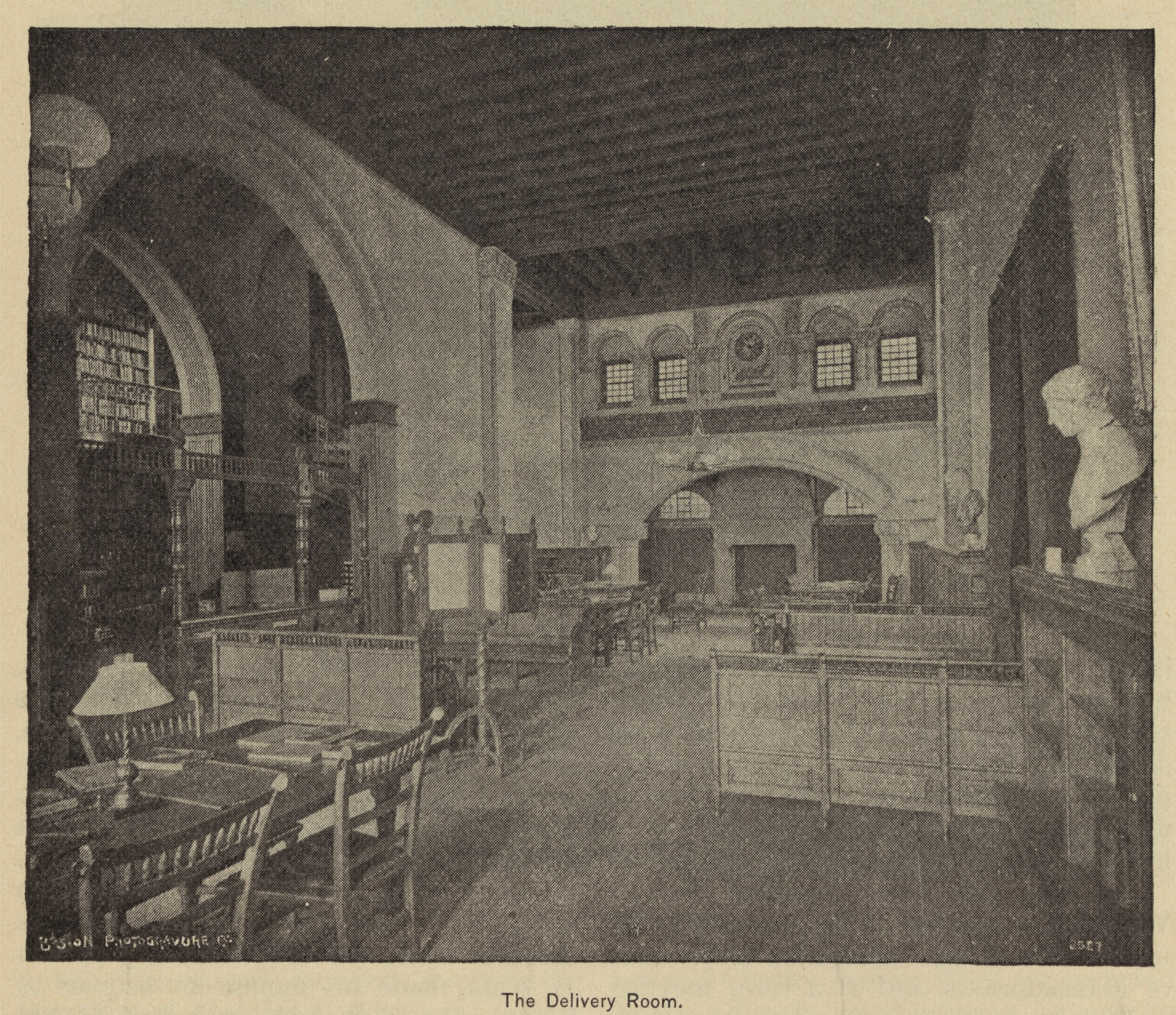
- The delivery room at their Boylston Street offices (1890)
- Status: Defunct
- Founded: 1885
- Country of origin: United States
- Headquarters location: Boston, Massachusetts, U.S.
- Key people: Ernest Oswald Cockayne
- Publication types: Books

Boston Photogravure Company was an American fine-art publisher specializing in the photogravure process. Based in Boston, Massachusetts, and established in 1885 as the Lewis Company, it changed its name the following year as part of a reorganization. It was purchased in 1888 by Josiah Byram Millet.

The company was highly regarded among the leading publishers and printers for its work, some of the methods of which were of their own invention. The accuracy of their work had not previously been deemed possible.

Under the title of the Lewis Company, it was stated in 1983 that they were responsible for "some of the best books ever published up to the present day".

In February 1891, the company began publishing The Engraver and Printer, an illustrated monthly journal demonstrating the newer methods of illustration. The company merged with Art Publishing Company, of Gardener, Massachusetts, later that year.

Their offices were originally located at 27 Boylston Street; later at 56.

== Selected works ==
- Historic and Picturesque Savannah (1889)
- Appearances in Paris Illustré
- Appearances in Figaro
