= John G. Lawton =

Savannah River steamboat exploded 1859

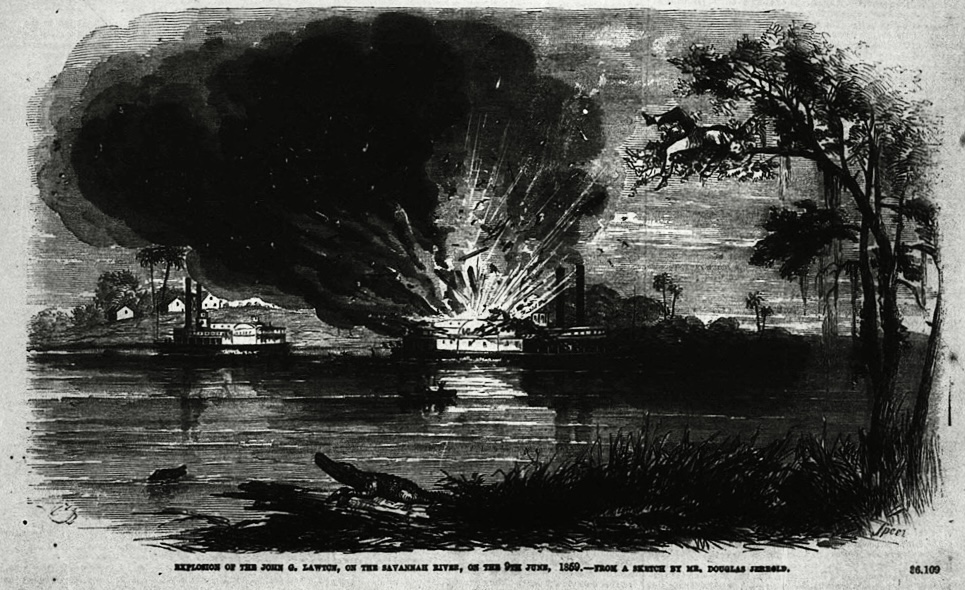
Frank Leslie's Illustrated News — "Explosion of the John G. Lawton, on the Savannah River, on the 9th June 1859 – from a sketch by Mr. Douglas Jerrold" — note the body in the tree on the right, apparently depicting James Strobhart (Whitworth University Digital Commons)

The John G. Lawton was a steamboat of the Savannah River in the United States. The ship's boilers exploded on June 9, 1859, just beyond Gum Stump Landing, about 20 mi (32 km) above the city of Savannah, Georgia, killing and injuring several people. The steamboat Excel "was in sight" at the time of the explosion and "promptly rendered assistance". The explosion was a cover story in Frank Leslie's Illustrated News.

Among those identified as killed:

- Gatty or Gates of Barnwell, South Carolina
- Mr. Washington Goette of Silver Hill, South Carolina (possibly same as previous)
- Edward Grant, "white deck hand"
- John S. Montmollin, banker and illegal slave trader of Savannah
- John Robison, "colored cabin boy, property of Mrs. P. Prendergast," possibly also described as "John Robertson, waiter, colored, missing"
- Richard Scaborough, deck passenger, of Purysburg
- John Stone, "colored fireman, property of F.M. Stone" of Columbus, Georgia
- James Strobhart of Savannah
- John Williams, "colored pilot"

Missing:

- Capt. T.G. Keeble
- Allen, the property of Mr. Orman
- Negro, property of Mr. Augustus Osmand (possibly same as Allen)
- "Colored deckhand, name unknown"

Early on Saturday morning the body of Mr. J. S. Montmollin, a passenger on board the ill-fated Lawton was brought to Savannah. The body was found on the edge of the marsh, some 150 yards from where the explosion occurred. It was discovered by a negro, who had climbed a tree to take a survey of the marsh; he could see the legs of the body protruding from the mud, and directed those on the ground to the spot where it lay. The body was found buried in the mud up to the thighs, and almost in a perpendicular position, with the legs above, half covered with water. It took the united strength of three negroes to extricate the body from the position.

— Frank Leslie's Illustrated News, July 2, 1859

== See also ==
- Timeline of Savannah, Georgia
