= 1876 yellow fever epidemic =

Disease outbreak in Savannah, Georgia, United States

- Location: Savannah, Georgia
- Deaths: 1,066

The 1876 yellow fever epidemic killed 1,066 people in Savannah, Georgia, United States. The outbreak began in July 1876, with its first victim―and believed source of the infection―being J. W. Schull, a 27-year-old sailor. In the six-week period following his infection, around 5,000 (18%) of the approximately 28,000 residents of Savannah had fled the city to escape the disease. The fever killed 6% of the city's population. It came 32 years after another yellow fever epidemic, which killed 1,040.

== Background ==
"There was no yellow fever in the United States in the summer of 1876 before it appeared in Savannah. The disease, therefore, must have been imported there or have originated in that city," stated Alfred A. Woodhull, M.D., Surgeon General of the United States Army, four years later in the pages of the American Public Health Association's (APHA) Public Health Papers and Reports, Volume 5. His study was titled May Not Yellow Fever Originate in the United States?: An Etiological Study of the Epidemic at Savannah in 1876. It was read at the seventh annual meeting of APHA in Nashville, Tennessee, on November 20, 1879.

== Investigation ==
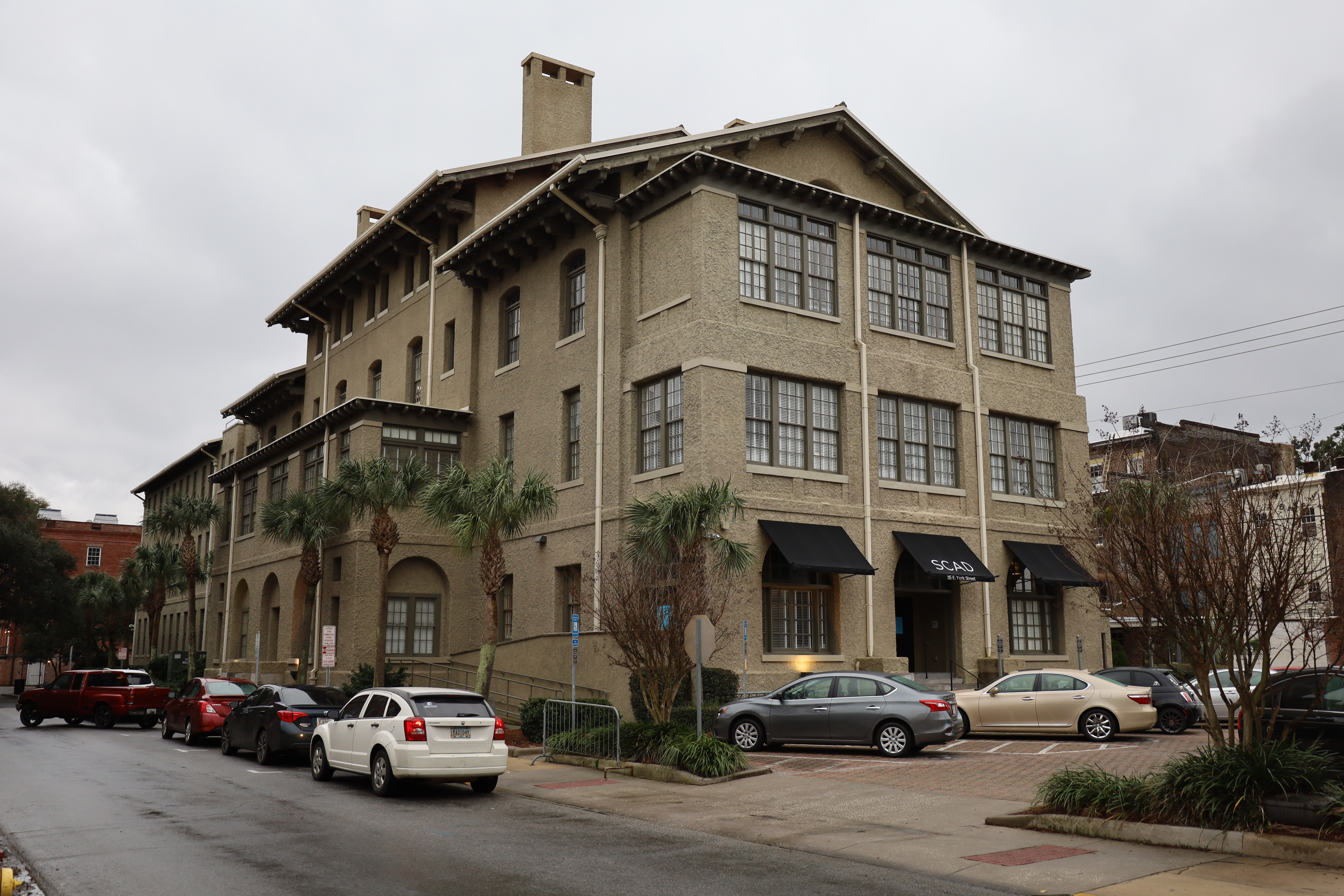
Savannah's former Marine Hospital, at which Schull was evaluated

Woodhull reported that "a careful inquiry" had pinpointed Delaware native J. W. Schull, the steward of the schooner F. A. Server, as the primary case of the disease's outbreak. Schull's vessel had arrived in Savannah from New York City, laden with coal (or ice, according to another source), on July 10, 1876. Schull fell sick while aboard just under two weeks later, on July 23. He was taken ashore to the boarding house of Mrs. Hearn, on Indian Street at the corner of Ann Street, on July 25. After receiving treatment from a doctor, William Duncan, who diagnosed congestive fever, Schull stayed there for three days, before being moved to Savannah's Marine Hospital. In the meantime, Mrs. Hearn's son-in-law David Coleman, slept in the bed Schull had been using. He left for Darien, Georgia, on August 16 and, two days later, endured a four-hour fever. He survived and returned to Savannah on August 19.

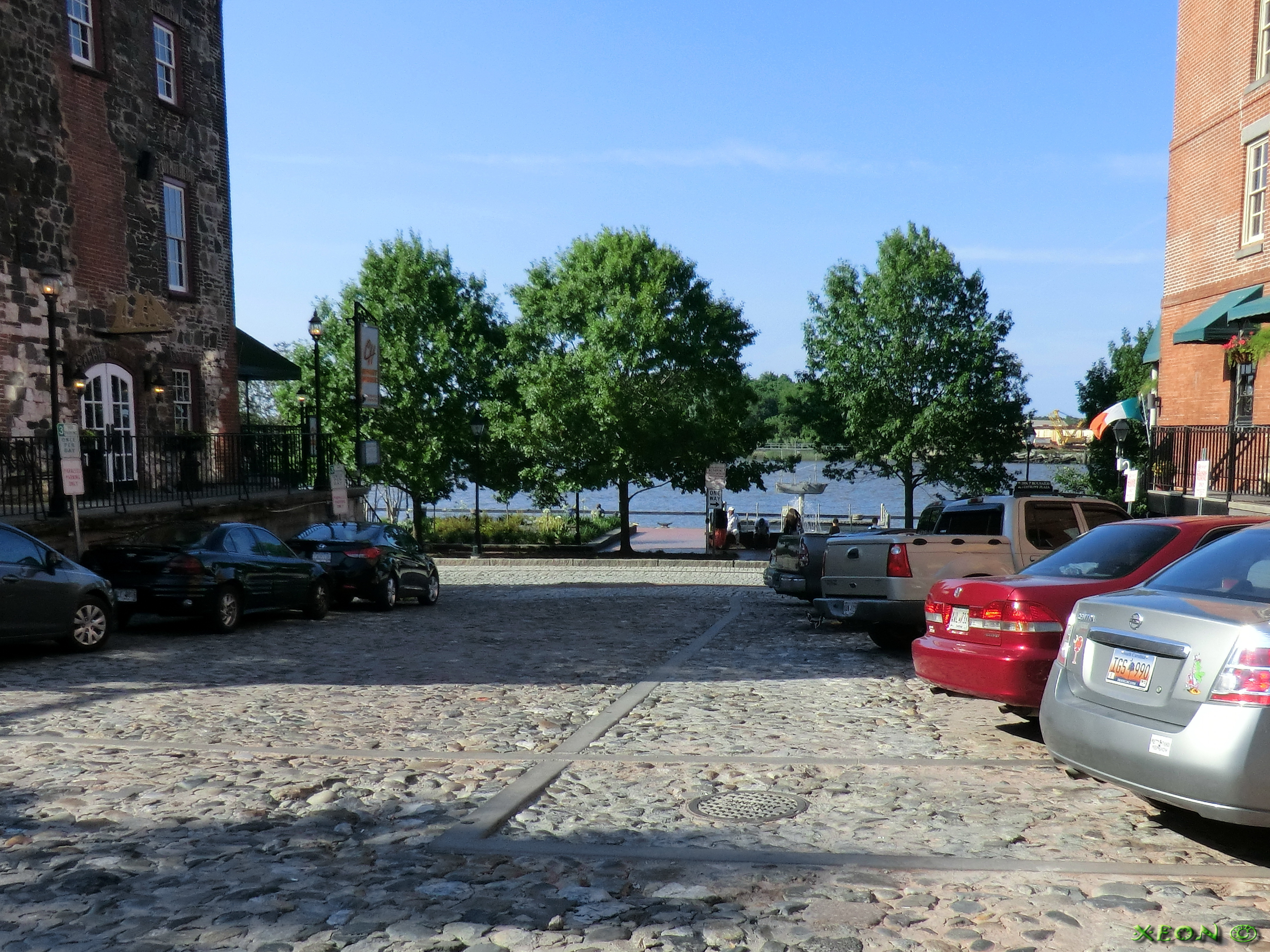
The Savannah River at the foot of Barnard Street, where Schull's vessel was berthed

Yellow fever was not diagnosed in Schull by the surgeon in charge at the Marine Hospital before Schull was discharged from its wards; it only became evident in retrospect.

On August 17, Thomas Magner Jr., a child living at his family's grocery store on the opposite corner of Ann Street from the boarding house, was attacked by the disease, which then "spread rapidly in every direction from that centre."

It is believed that the disease could not have been contracted by Schull anywhere but aboard the Server since he had been attached to that vessel for just over a year, during which time it remained solely in United States waters. It is assumed that Schull was infected by the populace aboard the Spanish brig Ynez, which arrived from Havana on July 16 and was berthed around 90 feet (27 m) above the Server at the docks of the Atlantic and Gulf Railroad at the foot of Barnard Street from July 18, five days before Schull was taken ill. Some claim Schull boarded the neighboring vessel, "consorting intimately with her cook, for the sake of cigars", but both its captain and crew denied this.

1,066 people died during the epidemic, and many of Savannah's doctors also attributed the outbreak to local climate and unsanitary conditions in the city.

== Schull's death ==
Schull died on July 30, 1876, aged 27. While "sitting up in bed calm and cheerful, he was taken with sudden hemorrhage. The blood escaped from his mouth in quantities, was red and frothy, and death ensued almost immediately." An autopsy undertaken four hours later recorded that Schull had yellow skin, lungs filled with blood, traces of incipient tubercles in the lungs, with ulcers on their exterior, and his liver was a "complete boxwood color."

== See also ==
- History of yellow fever
- List of notable disease outbreaks in the United States
- 1876 in the United States
- Edward Clifford Anderson Jr., a victim of the epidemic
