= William Duncan (American physician) =

American physician (1840–1900)

- Born: January 4, 1840; Savannah, Georgia, U.S.
- Died: December 27, 1900 (aged 60); Savannah, Georgia, U.S.
- Resting place: Laurel Grove Cemetery, Savannah, Georgia, U.S.
- Occupation: Physician

William Duncan (January 4, 1840 – December 27, 1900) was a prominent 19th-century American physician from Savannah, Georgia. During the American Civil War, he was the Confederate States Army's assistant surgeon with the 10th Georgia Infantry Regiment, and went on to become dean of Savannah Medical College and an alderman of the city.

== Life and career ==
Duncan was born in 1840 in Savannah, Georgia, to William Duncan (1799–1879), a native of Scotland, and Elizabeth McClellan. His mother died, aged 30, when Duncan was exactly one month old.

He studied at Chatham Academy, Springfield Academy and Oglethorpe University. He then graduated as a Doctor of Medicine from Savannah Medical College in March 1861 and, four years later, from Rotunda Hospital in Dublin, Ireland. After further studies at King's College Hospital in London and in hospitals in Paris, he settled back in his hometown of Savannah in 1866.

During the American Civil War, he was assistant surgeon in the Confederate States Army, and served in field hospitals in both Savannah and Harrisburg, Pennsylvania.

Duncan became a member of both the Medical Association of Georgia and of the Georgia Medical Society.

He succeeded Dr. J. D. Fish as dean of Savannah Medical College in 1872, a role in which he remained for nine years. He had been professor of clinical medicine.

For twenty years, Duncan was chief surgeon of the Savannah, Florida & Western Railway, and for thirty years he was superintendent and a manager of the Savannah Hospital.

In July 1876, Duncan was the doctor who treated J. W. Schull, the first victim and believed source of the yellow fever epidemic to hit Savannah and the United States that summer.

Duncan was an alderman of Savannah for twelve years, and was also a member of the city's Board of Sanitary Commissioners. He was elected a member of the Georgia state legislature in 1896, serving one term.

Georgia governor Allen D. Candler appointed Duncan a member of the Board of Commissioners of Georgia's State Lunatic, Idiot, and Epileptic Asylum in Milledgeville, Georgia, a role in which he remained until his death.

Duncan was a 32nd Degree Freemason.

== Death ==
Duncan died in 1900, aged 60. He was interred in Savannah's Laurel Grove Cemetery beside his parents. He bequeathed around $80,000, one half of his estate, to Savannah Hospital.
