= Coastal Transitional Center =

Prison in Savannah, Georgia, US

Coordinates: 32°04′42″N 81°06′41″W

- Interactive map of Coastal Transitional Center
- Location: Savannah, Georgia, Chatham County, Georgia
- Security class: Minimum security prison
- Capacity: 200
- Opened: 1940

Coastal Transitional Center is a minimum security prison located in Savannah, Georgia, in Chatham County, Georgia. The facility houses adult male felons; the capacity is 200. It was constructed in 1940 and was renovated in 2003. It has 44 living units ranging in size from four to 12 beds.

The mission of Coastal Transitional Center is to protect the community while assisting residents in making a successful transition back into society. It provides social and employment skills in a structured environment. Coastal State Prison, located in Garden City, Georgia, is the host facility for the transitional center.

The transitional center features long-term maintenance residents assigned as permanent workers in Food Service, Maintenance, Lawn Care, Laundry Services, Sanitation, Barbering, and details for other government facilities, while the remaining residents participate in the work release program.
