= Historic and Picturesque Savannah =

Historical publication by Adelaide Wilson

- Author: Adelaide Wilson
- Language: English
- Genre: History
- Publisher: Boston Photogravure Company
- Publication date: 1889 (137 years ago)
- Publication place: United States
- Pages: 258
- ISBN: 9780722208632

Historic and Picturesque Savannah is a book by Adelaide Wilson, published in 1889 by Boston Photogravure Company. It outlines the history of Savannah, Georgia, from its earliest period to the late 19th century.

The book contains fourteen chapters and about sixty-five illustrations (the work of Georgia Weymouth), which "keep pace very evenly with the pen-pictures".

Scholar Select reprinted the book in 2018, stating it had been "selected by scholars as being culturally important, and is part of the knowledge base of civilization as we know it."

== See also ==
- Cosmo P. Richardsone, a subject of the work
