= Alfred Alexander Woodhull =

American army surgeon

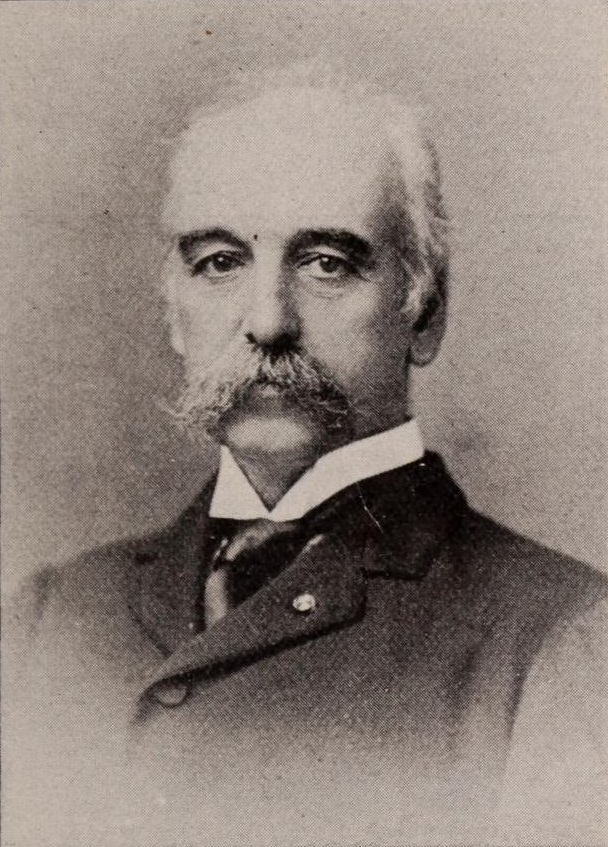
- Born: April 13, 1837; Princeton, New Jersey, U.S.
- Died: October 18, 1921 (aged 84); Princeton, New Jersey, U.S.
- Education: Lawrenceville School
- Occupation: Surgeon
- Known for: First to call to the attention of the service the necessity of co-operation between the medical and line officers in the promotion of military hygiene
- Relatives: Dr. Alfred Alexander and Anna Maria (Salomons) Woodhull
- Medical career
- Institutions: Medical Corps
- Notable works: Provisional Manual for Exercise of Company Bearers and Hospital Corp
- Awards: Gold medal of the Military Service Institution

Alfred Alexander Woodhull (April 13, 1837 – October 18, 1921) was an American army surgeon. In 1885, he received the gold medal of the Military Service Institution and in 1907 the Seaman essay prize. Woodhull was the first to call to the attention of the service the necessity of co-operation between the medical and line officers in the promotion of military hygiene.

== Early life ==
Coat of Arms of Alfred Alexander Woodhull

Woodhull was born at Princeton, New Jersey, on April 13, 1837, to Dr. Alfred Alexander and Anna Maria (Salomons) Woodhull. After graduating from the Lawrenceville School in 1852, he received a Bachelor of Arts degree in 1856 from the College of New Jersey. In 1859, he received his master's degree from the College of New Jersey and his medical degree from the University of Pennsylvania. He practised medicine in Leavenworth, Kansas, and then at Eudora, Kansas.

== Military career ==
When the Civil War began, he helped recruit a troop of militia and was commissioned as a lieutenant. He was appointed to the Medical Corps on September 19, 1861, and served for the duration of the war. He was medical inspector for the Army of the James from 1864 to 1865, and was breveted lieutenant-colonel in March 1865.

After the war ended, he was assigned to the Army Medical Museum in Washington, D.C., where he prepared the "Surgical Section" of the Catalogue of the United States Army Medical Museum in 1866. In 1868, he published A Medical Report upon the Uniform and Clothing of the Soldiers of the United States Army. On December 15, 1868, he married Margaret Ellicott from Baltimore, Maryland.

He was a member of the Surgeon-General's office. In 1875 and 1876, he wrote papers advocating the use of sub-emetic doses of ipecacuanha in the treatment of dysentery. His duties included instruction in military hygiene at the Infantry and Cavalry School at Fort Leavenworth, Kansas, from 1886 to 1890 and command of the Army and Navy Hospital at Hot Springs, Arkansas, from 1892 to 1895. In 1881, he wrote Quarter Century Report of the Class of 1856 of the College of New Jersey. He was awarded the gold medal of the Military Service Institution for his paper on "The Enlisted Soldier," which was published in its Journal for March 1887.

In 1891, he travelled to England to study the British Army's medical care and published a report in 1894. In 1895, he was appointed medical inspector of the Department of the Colorado. In 1899, he became chief surgeon of the Department of the Pacific at Manila. He wrote Provisional Manual for Exercise of Company Bearers and Hospital Corp in 1889, and Notes on Military Hygiene for Officers of the Line. He was retired in 1901 and, in 1904, he was promoted to brigadier-general on the retired list.

== After retirement from the U. S. Army ==
After his retirement, he returned to Princeton, where he was a lecturer on personal hygiene and general sanitation from 1902 to 1907. He also wrote Personal Hygiene: Designed for Undergraduates in 1906. In 1907, he received the Seaman prize for an article about hygiene and sanitation instruction in military and naval service schools, that was published in the Military Service Institution's Journal in the March–April 1908 issue. In 1913, he wrote a tactical study of the Battle of Princeton. He died in Princeton on October 18, 1921.
