= J. W. Schull =

- Born: 1849; Delaware, U.S.
- Died: July 30, 1876 (aged 27); Savannah, Georgia, U.S.
- Resting place: Laurel Grove Cemetery, Savannah, Georgia, U.S.
- Occupation: Sailor
- Known for: First victim and believed source of the 1876 yellow fever epidemic in the United States

J. W. Schull (1849 – July 30, 1876) was an American sailor who was the first victim—and believed source of—the yellow fever that struck the United States in the summer of 1876. In the six-week period following his infection, around 5,000 (18%) of the approximately 28,000 residents of Savannah, Georgia, had fled the city to escape the disease.

== Death ==
Schull died on July 30, 1876, aged 27. While "sitting up in bed calm and cheerful, he was taken with sudden hemorrhage. The blood escaped from his mouth in quantities, was red and frothy, and death ensued almost immediately." An autopsy undertaken four hours later recorded that Schull had yellow skin, lungs filled with blood, traces of incipient tubercles in the lungs, with ulcers on their exterior, and his liver was a "complete boxwood color."

He was interred in Savannah's Laurel Grove Cemetery.
