= Central of Georgia Railroad Terminal =

Central of Georgia Railroad Terminal or Central of Georgia Depot may refer to:

(by state then city)

- Central of Georgia Depot (Andalusia, Alabama), listed on the NRHP in Alabama
- Central of Georgia Railroad Terminal (700 12th St., Columbus, Georgia), listed on the NRHP in Georgia
- Central of Georgia Railroad Terminal (1200 6th Ave., Columbus, Georgia), listed on the NRHP in Georgia
- Central of Georgia Depot and Trainshed, Savannah, Georgia, listed on the NRHP in Georgia
- Central of Georgia Railroad: Savannah Shops and Terminal Facilities, Savannah, GA, listed on the NRHP in Georgia
- Central of Georgia Railway Company Shop Property, Savannah, GA, listed on the NRHP in Georgia

== See also ==
- Central of Georgia Railway
