= Savannah station =

Savannah station may refer to:

- Savannah station (Amtrak), the current train station in Savannah, Georgia
- Savannah Union Station, a demolished former train station in Savannah
- The former train station at the Central of Georgia Railroad: Savannah Shops and Terminal Facilities
