= Solomon C. Johnson =

American businessman (1867–1954)

- Johnson c. 1940
- Born: Solomon Charles Johnson; November 20, 1868; Laurel Hill, South Carolina, United States
- Died: March 1, 1954 (aged 85); Savannah, Georgia, United States
- Resting place: Laurel Grove Cemetery
- Occupation: Businessman
- Known for: Ownership of the Savannah Tribune

Solomon Charles Johnson, commonly known as Sol C. Johnson, (November 20, 1868 – March 1, 1954) was an American publisher and businessman based in Savannah, Georgia. He was the editor of the Savannah Tribune from 1889 until his death in 1954. He owned the newspaper from 1909.

== Life and career ==
Johnson was born in Laurel Hill, South Carolina, in 1868. He moved north to Savannah, Georgia, as a young boy. He attended West Broad Street School, on today's Martin Luther King Jr. Boulevard.

In 1882, he was listed as being a driver for J. Feeley, before he began learning the art of printing by working as a printer's devil at the Savannah Echo, which was owned by Thomas T. Harden.

Johnson moved on to begin a career at the Savannah Tribune, then owned by Colonel John H. Deveaux (1848–1909). He became the editor in 1889, when Deveaux moved to Brunswick, Georgia. He purchased the paper after Deveaux's death in 1909, and remained in the position for the next 65 years, until his own death. His assistant was his goddaughter Willa Mae Ayers Johnson (died 1991), who ran the publication after Johnson's death. The newspaper urged its readers to fight segregation, particularly on the city's streetcars. James Weldon Johnson was a correspondent for the Tribune in the 1920s.

Other roles Johnson held included Grand Secretary of Grand Lodge of Georgia of Prince Hall Freemasonry (for 54 years), an organizer of the Grand Chapter of Georgia, Prince Hall Order of the Eastern Star, in 1898 (including as its patron for over fifty years), president of the board of trustees of Charity Hospital, trustee of Savannah's Carnegie Library, and organizer of the West Broad Street YMCA.

Johnson served as clerk of Savannah's First Congregational Church for several years. He was one of its members from 1894 until his death.

In 1952, Johnson's 72-year-old wife secured a restraining order to prevent his transferring any of his estate to Willa Mae. She said Johnson had "deserted her in 1912 without reason." In 1945, Johnson signed a deed of conveyance to Willa Mae. His wife also asked that a receiver be appointed to run the newspaper.

=== Death and legacy ===
Johnson died in Savannah in 1954, aged 85. He was interred in Savannah's Laurel Grove Cemetery.

Savannah's Sol C. Johnson High School was named in his honor.
