= PODO Museum =

Contemporary Art Museum on Jeju Island, South Korea

Coordinates: 33.3193°N 126.3858°E

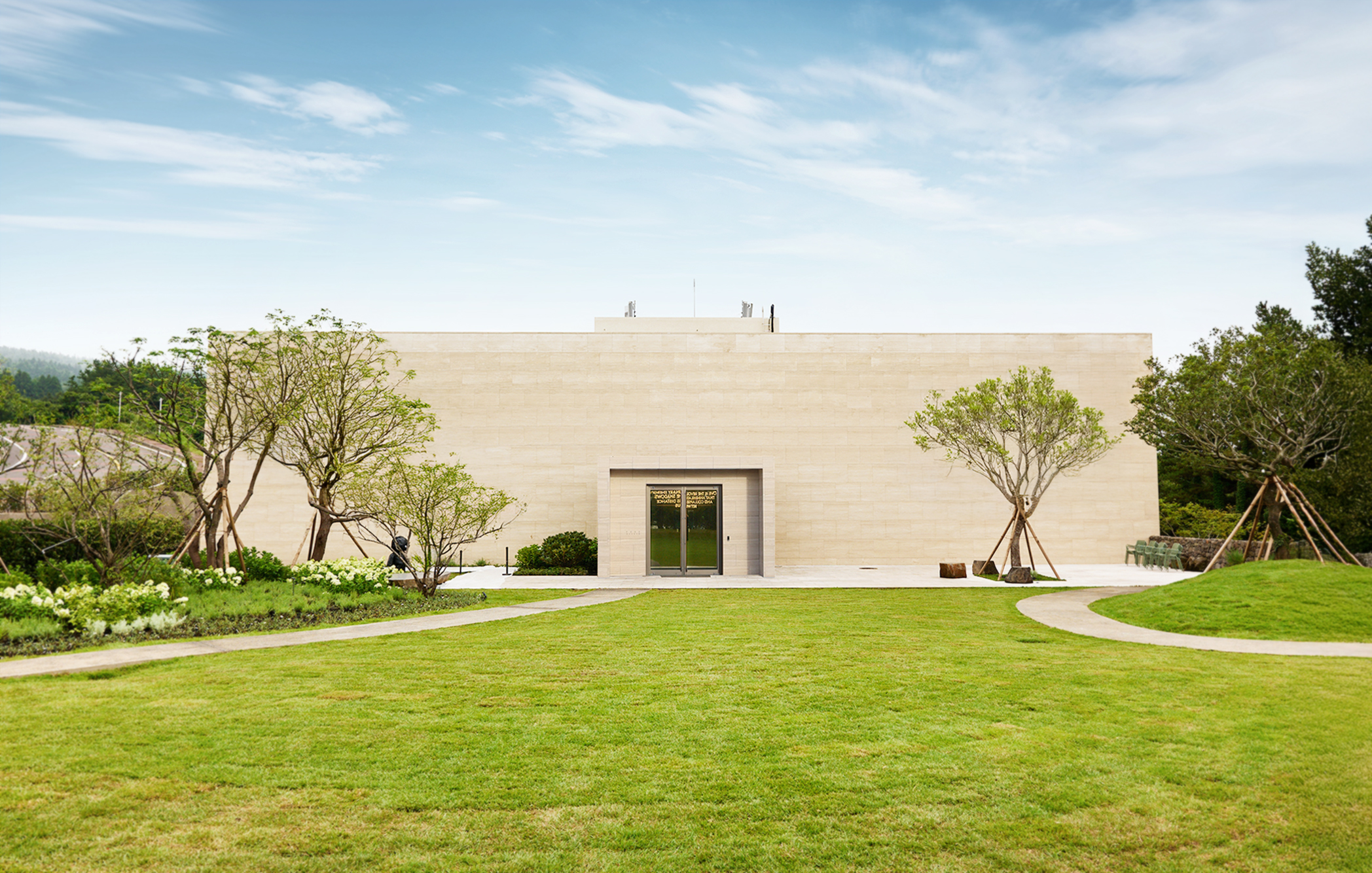

General information
- Location: 788, Sallongnam0-ro, Andeok-myeon, Seogwipo-si, Jeju Island, South Korea

Website
- www.podomuseum.com

Korean name
- Hangul: 포도뮤지엄
- RR: Podo myujieom
- MR: P'odo myujiŏm

The PODO Museum (Korean: 포도뮤지엄) is a private art museum and cultural complex on Jeju Island, in South Korea. The name PODO means "grape" in Korean and the museum neighbors PODO Hotel, which was designed by Korean-Japanese architect Jun Itami.

== History ==
The PODO Museum was inaugurated on April 24, 2021, under the directorship of Chloe H Kim. The building was designed in 2011 by the late architect Kim Seok Chul (1943–2016), who also designed the Korean pavilion in the Giardini of the Venice Biennale with Venetian architect Franco Mancuso.

== Exhibitions ==
Exhibitions at the PODO Museum are on an annual basis.

- The World We Made (April 24, 2021 – May 23, 2022) showcased the works of the following artists: Airan Kang, Zhang Xiaogang, Yongbaek Lee, Kijong Zin, Ryota Kuwakubo, Yongju Kwon, Seonglib, Sujin Choi. This exhibition was also available on Naver's metaverse platform Zepeto and its 13 artworks were up for auction on Featured by Binance (August 8–15, 2021)
- It is Spring, My Son (April 24, 2021 – May 23, 2022) was a solo exhibition of German Expressionist Käthe Schmidt Kollwitz.
- Yet, With Love (July 5, 2022 – July 3, 2023) showcased the works of the following artists: Beikyoung Lee, Dongju Kang, Yeondoo Jung, Yoko Ono, Reena Kallat, Ugo Rondinone, Alfredo & Isabel AQUILIZAN
- Perhaps Sunny Days (March 20, 2024 – March 20, 2025) showcases the works of the following artists: Alan Belcher, Louise Bourgeois, Cheryle St. Onge, Yeondoo Jung, Ye-eun Min, Robert Therrien, The Caretaker & Ivan Seal, Davis Birks, Chiharu Shiota, Kyungwoo Chun
- We, Such Fragile Beings (August 9, 2025 – August 8, 2026) showcases the works of the following artists: Mona Hatoum, Jenny Holzer, Liza Lou, Annabel Daou, Sumi Kanazawa, Maarten Baas, Sarah Sze, Lee Wan, Boo Jihyun, Kim Hanyoung, Song Dong, Sho Shibuya, Robert Montgomery. The exhibition reflects on human fragility and coexistence through themes of conflict, memory, and time.
- Kimsooja, To Breathe—Sunhyewon (September 3 – October 19, 2025) was a solo exhibition by Kimsooja, installed in Kyongheunggak, a traditional Hanok pavilion located within Sunhyewon in Samcheong-dong, Seoul.
