= Central of Georgia Railway Company Shop Property =

- U.S. National Register of Historic Places
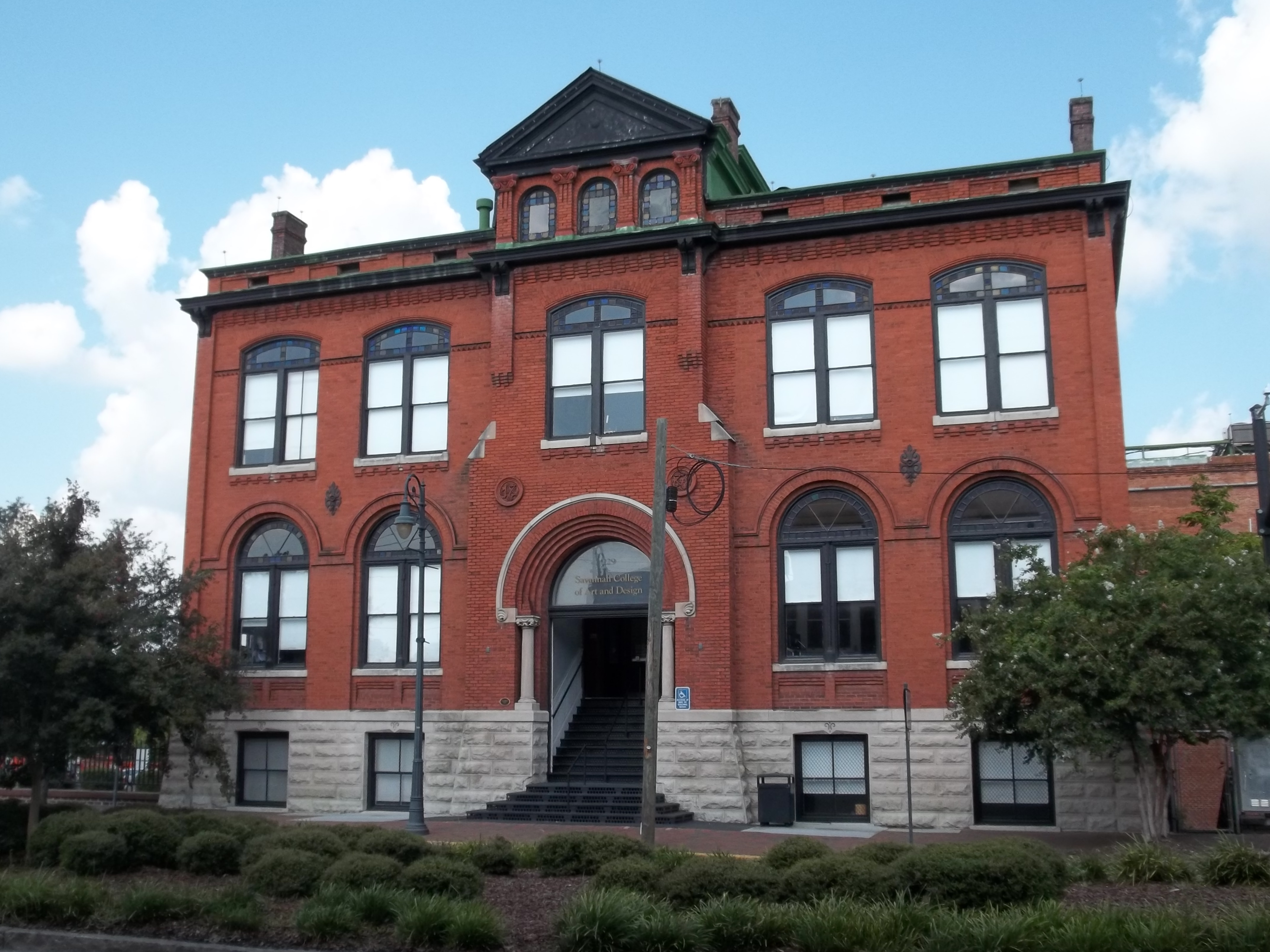

- Location within Georgia Location within the United States
- Location: 233 Broad Street (now MLK Jr. Blvd and Fahm Ave.) Savannah, Georgia
- Coordinates: 32.07700°N 81.09881°W
- Built: 1854
- Architect: William Morrill Wadley; Et al.
- Architectural style: Queen Anne, Romanesque
- NRHP reference No.: 70000199
- Added to NRHP: March 5, 1970

Central of Georgia Railway Company Shop Property is the former administration building of the Central of Georgia Railway. The site complex includes several notable structures, including a freight house, a cotton yard with brick gates which it shares with the Central of Georgia Depot and Trainshed, and a brick viaduct leading to a junction with the line along Louisville Road west of Boundary Street and the Savannah and Ogeechee Canal. The tracks were also located next to "The Gray Building," a Greek Revival structure built in 1856, which the C&G moved their headquarters to. This building became known as "The Red Building."

The Central Railroad was acquired by the Southern Railway in 1963, leading to the decline of all CG buildings in Savannah.

The building was listed on the National Register of Historic Places on March 5th, 1970. The CG Depot and Trainshed were added to the NRHP and then declared a National Historic Landmark in 1976, and the Central of Georgia Railroad: Savannah Shops and Terminal Facilities were split off from the station onto its own registry in 1978.

Today it is known as Clark Hall (formerly Eichberg Hall), a branch of the Savannah College of Art and Design School of Building Arts. The Gray Building was the original museum, which was named Kiah Hall in 1993.

== See also ==
- Buildings in Savannah Historic District
