= Johnson High School (Savannah, Georgia) =

Public high school located in Savannah, Georgia, United States

- Sol C. Johnson High School

Location
- 3012 Sunset Blvd; Savannah, Georgia 31404; United States; 32°01′56″N 81°03′31″W

Information
- Type: Public high school
- Motto: "Not to Equal but Excel."
- Established: 1959 (67 years ago)
- School district: Savannah-Chatham County Public Schools
- CEEB code: 112714
- Principal: Derrick Dozier-Muhammad
- Staff: 65.40 (FTE)
- Grades: 9-12
- Enrollment: 762 (2024-2025)
- Student to teacher ratio: 11.65
- Campus type: Urban
- Colors: Blue and orange
- Athletics: GHSA Class AAA Region 3
- Nickname: Atom Smashers
- Website: johnson.sccpss.com

Sol C. Johnson High School, known as Johnson High School, is a public high school located in Savannah, Georgia, United States. A unit of the Savannah-Chatham County School System, it has been ranked number 819 among Newsweek magazine's top 1,500 U.S. secondary schools based on advanced placement and International Baccalaureate test scores. According to the Savannah Morning News, Johnson High students have been "taking strides forward" in their recent performance on the statewide Georgia High School Graduation Test.

Johnson High was named in the "America’s Best High Schools 2010" edition of Newsweek.

== History ==
Johnson High was originally named Powell Laboratory School when it opened on Savannah's eastside in 1959. With an enrollment of approximately 1,000 students, it consisted of grades nine through twelve and was administered by Savannah State College (now Savannah State University). In 1960 the school was renamed after Sol C. Johnson, a prominent local journalist, philanthropist, educator, and editor of the Savannah Tribune, the nation's oldest newspaper catering to African-Americans.

== Academics ==
Academic programs at Johnson High include the ninth-grade academy and the International Baccalaureate. Like most large high schools, Johnson includes a range of special education and advanced placement courses.

== Student activities ==
=== Clubs and organizations ===
- Future Business Leaders of America
- National Junior Classical League
- National Honor Society
- NJROTC
- Flag Team
- Spanish Club
- Mock Trial
- Jobs for Georgia Graduates
- Foreign Media Studies Club
- Danceline
- Majorette

== Notable alumni ==
- Raphael Warnock, pastor and U.S. senator
- Otis Brock III, former Chief Operations Officer of Savannah-Chatham County Public School System
