= Hampton station (Georgia) =

- Hampton Depot
- U.S. National Register of Historic Places
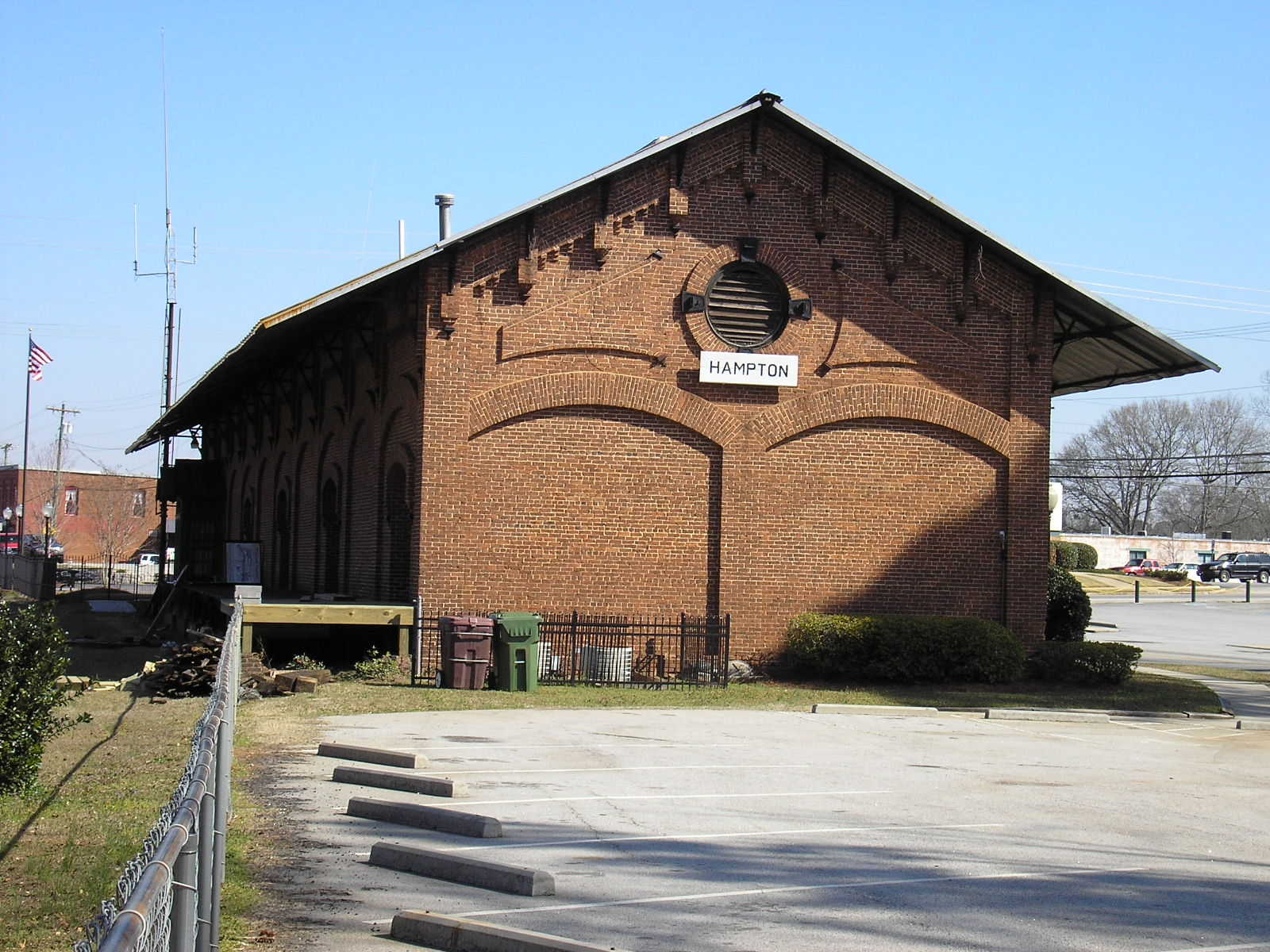

- Location within Georgia Location within the United States
- Location: E. Main St., Hampton, Georgia
- Coordinates: 33°23′05″N 84°16′59″W
- Area: less than one acre
- Built: 1881
- Architect: Augustus Schwaab
- Architectural style: Late Victorian
- NRHP reference No.: 79000730
- Added to NRHP: September 10, 1979

Hampton Depot is a historic train station in Hampton, Henry County, Georgia. It was listed on the National Register of Historic Places in 1979.

It is a 35 by 170 feet (11 m × 52 m) one-story building built in 1881.

On March 26, 2011, the Colonial Dames of Georgia had a formal dedication and plaque installation on the north end of the depot, near the depot park.

The town of Hampton was the county's only rail connection from 1846 until 1882. The present Hampton Depot had its origins in 1873, when the superintendent reported at the annual meeting of the president and directors of the Central Railroad and Banking Company that the depot "at Hampton is entirely too small and insecure, and ought to be replaced by a larger and more substantial one at the earliest day possible." He also announced that a cotton platform had recently been built next to the old wooden depot. The old wooden depot was later moved to Griffin, Georgia. In the superintendent's report of September 1, 1880, it was announced that "a new brick warehouse has been commenced at Hampton on the Atlanta division. The building will be 35 feet wide and 170 feet long, this will give ample room for the transaction of business at that station and will also enable us to provide comfortable reception rooms for passengers." The Hampton Depot was completed in 1881.

The Hampton Depot was unusual in that it included a warehouse for cotton in the same building with the passenger area. Other cities had separate cotton markets. Passenger service for Hampton was four trains per day in 1940, although three stopped only if flagged down. By 1950, it was two per day, one of those by flag, and by 1955, only one per day, by flag only. Passenger rail service in Hampton ended in 1957.

In 1975, the depot was donated to the City of Hampton, which renovated the passenger area for use as a city hall and police department, council chambers and recorder's court. The land is still owned by the railroad; the depot is now the "Glenn Mitchell Administration and Community Building." (Glenn Mitchell was Hampton's mayor from December 1950 until December 1972, and again, from December 1974 until December 1978.)

The rooms off the park side of the depot, now house the Main Street Director, and a museum with items donated and on-loan from various residents of Hampton.

== See also ==
- National Register of Historic Places listings in Henry County, Georgia

Preceding station	Central of Georgia Railway	Following station
Lovejoy toward Atlanta	Main Line	Sunnyside toward Savannah
