= SCAD Museum of Art =

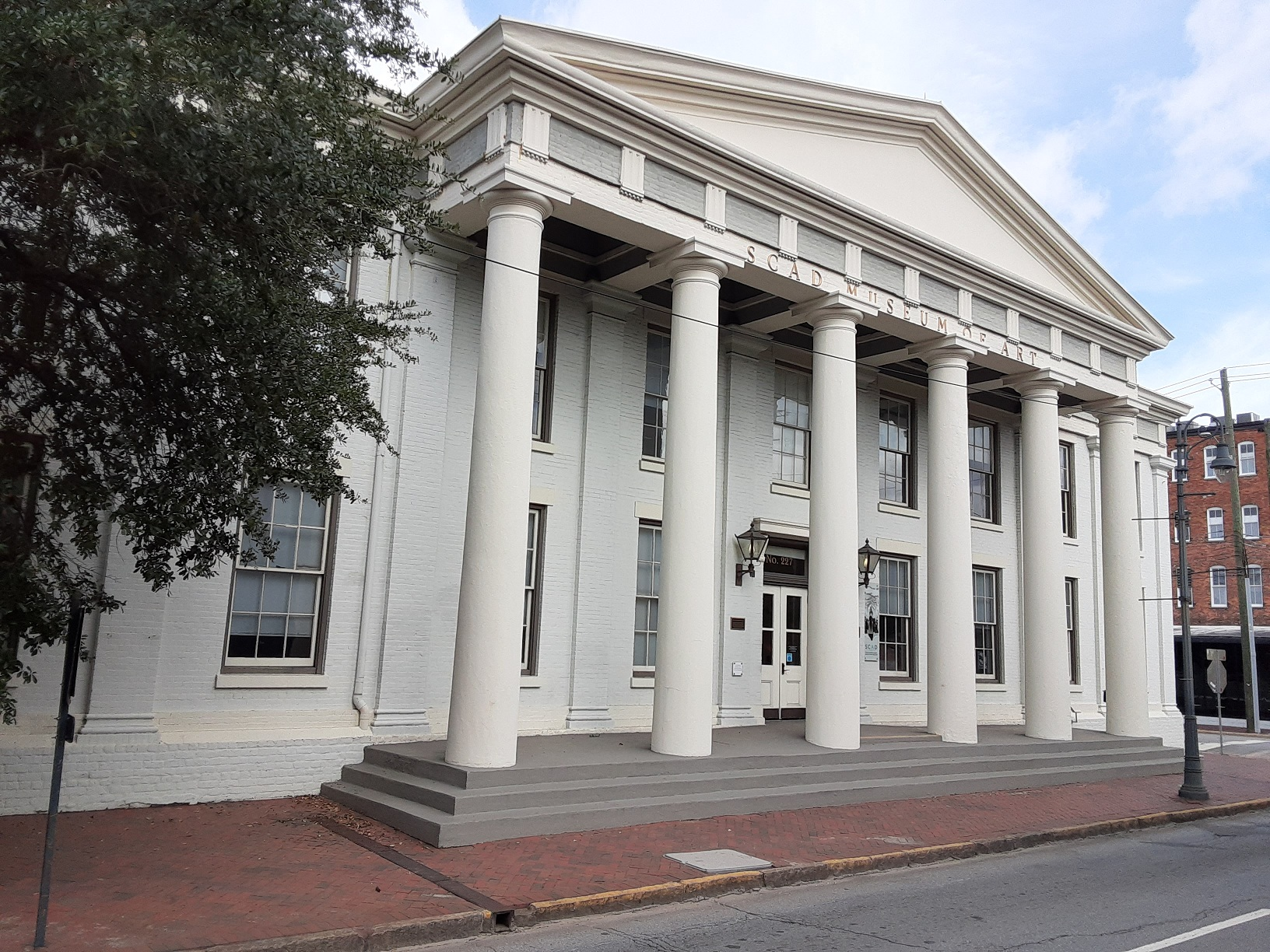
- The Savannah College of Art and Design Museum of Art building in 2021
- Interactive fullscreen map
- Established: 2002
- Location: 601 Turner Blvd., Savannah, Georgia; United States
- Coordinates: 32°04′40″N 81°06′00″W
- Type: Art museum
- Website: scadmoa.org

The SCAD Museum of Art was founded in 2002 as part of the Savannah College of Art and Design in Savannah, Georgia, and originally was known as the Earle W. Newton Center for British American Studies.

The museum's permanent collection of more than 4,500 pieces includes works of haute couture, drawings, painting, sculpture, photography, prints and more.

The SCAD Museum of Art is a teaching museum, serving Savannah College of Art and Design students and as well as members of the community and other visitors. A focal point is the Walter O. Evans Center for African American Studies, a multidisciplinary center for the study, understanding and appreciation of African American culture, art and literature. It is complemented by the new André Leon Talley Gallery, named for the Vogue contributing editor and SCAD Board of Trustees member.

On Oct. 29, 2011, the SCAD museum reopened after an extensive rehabilitation project. The revitalized museum featured new galleries and classrooms, a 250-seat theater, a terrace and outdoor projection screen, a conservation studio, a museum café, as well as a 12-foot-long orientation touch table. An 86-foot-tall steel and glass lantern welcomes visitors and elegantly redefines the Savannah city skyline.

== History ==
The museum originally was housed in an 1856 Greek Revival structure, originally known as the Gray Building, which was once home to the headquarters of the Central of Georgia Railway. This National Historic Landmark is the only surviving antebellum railroad complex in the country.

Established in 2002 as the Earle W. Newton Center for British American Studies (named after the gift of a major collection of British and American art from Newton in 2001), the museum was renamed the SCAD Museum of Art in 2006, recognizing its expanding collections.

Further exterior renovations were completed in 2007 and 2008, including masonry repair, window restoration, drainage improvements and the replacement of the original 150-year-old roof. Today, the adjoining 1853 depot is the continued focus of SCAD’s most recent restoration efforts.

== Expansion ==
Following a groundbreaking ceremony in January 2010, SCAD architects, designers and craftsmen integrated the building's history with its future, analyzing and reproducing key original components, down to the chemical compounds of the 19th-century mortar.

At present, the museum is outfitted with low-energy-consuming light fixtures, zoned climate control, exterior cooling towers, low-flow plumbing fixtures for water-use reduction and low-emissivity (low-E) glass on the south elevation. Landscape planning for the courtyard made use of xeriscape planning, porous paving materials and custom irrigation plans.

Salvaged bricks and original heart pine timbers appear throughout the museum, as well as a majority of original high ceilings that allow for optimal temperature regulation and provide a dramatic background for the display and experience of art.

== Artworks ==
The SCAD Museum of Art houses the Walter O. Evans Collection of African American Art, one of the largest collections of African American art in the United States, which includes prized works by Edward Mitchell Bannister, Romare Bearden, Elizabeth Catlett, Robert S. Duncanson, Richard Hunt and Jacob Lawrence, while the Earle W. Newton Center of British and American Art features rare books, antique maps and paintings by William Hogarth, Sir Anthony van Dyck, Thomas Gainsborough and others. SCAD’s permanent collection of more than 4,500 works also includes items by Salvador Dalí, Nicholas Hlobo, Willem de Kooning, Annie Leibovitz, Robert Mapplethorpe, Wangechi Mutu, Pablo Picasso, Robert Rauschenberg, Andy Warhol and Carrie Mae Weems, as well as haute couture from Yves Saint Laurent, Chanel, Oscar de la Renta and Givenchy, among many others.

Upon its re-opening on Oct. 29, 2011, the museum kicked off with exhibitions by renowned contemporary artists Alfredo Jaar, Stephen Antonakos, Liza Lou, Bill Viola, Kendall Buster and Kehinde Wiley.

== Curators ==
- Daniel S. Palmer (chief curator) since 2022
- Ben Tollefson (curator)
- Brittany Richmond (Assistant curator)

== Collections ==
=== Walter O. Evans Collections of African American Art ===
The Walter O. Evans Collection of African American Art is one of the most important collections of African American visual art dating from the 18th century to the present.

The collection has been exhibited at many art museums around the country, including the Memorial Art Gallery of the University of Rochester in New York, the Columbia Museum of Art in South Carolina, the Detroit Institute of Arts in Michigan and the Tacoma Art Museum in Washington.

In 2006, part of the collection was donated to the museum.

=== Earle W. Newton Center for British and American Studies ===
Created by Earle W. Newton in 2001, this collection of reference materials covers the interconnections between the two countries in the 17th, 18th and 19th centuries. It also has several hundred portrait paintings by artists from both countries.

=== The SCAD Costume Collection ===
The SCAD Costume Collection includes garments donated by Cornelia Guest, daughter of fashion icon C.Z. Guest, and haute couture from Yves Saint Laurent, Chanel, Oscar de la Renta and Givenchy, among others.

=== The Modern and Contemporary Art Collection ===
The Modern and Contemporary Art Collection includes an array of Modern art works by major 19th- and 20th-century figures, from Goya and Renoir to Rauschenberg, Dalí and Picasso as well as contemporary works by artists such as Nicholas Hlobo, Yeondoo Jung, Wangechi Mutu, Yinka Shonibare and Carrie Mae Weems.

=== The 19th- and 20th-century Photography Collection ===
The 19th- and 20th-century Photography Collection, featuring works by Cartier-Bresson, Mapplethorpe, Leibovitz and Warhol.
