= John C. Lebey =

American architect (1905–2002)

- Born: John Courtenay Lebey; August 18, 1905; Savannah, Georgia, U.S.
- Died: March 6, 2002 (aged 96); Savannah, Georgia, U.S.
- Occupation: Architect
- Design: St. Matthew's Church; (Savannah, Georgia)

John Courtenay Lebey (August 18, 1905 – March 6, 2002) was an American architect, noted for his work in Savannah, Georgia. He also worked in other parts of Georgia and in Alabama, South Carolina, Tennessee and Texas.

== Early life ==
Lebey was born in Savannah, Georgia, to William Edward Lebey and Augusta "Gussie" Linder. He attended Savannah High School and graduated with a bachelor's degree in architecture from Georgia Tech. He went on to study at Ecole des Beaux-Arts in Fontainbleau, France.

== Career ==
Lebey was a member of the National Park Service's Eastern Architectural Branch, and was responsible for architectural work at Fort Pulaski, Fort Marion and Fort Matanzas.

He became known as a "legendary Savannah architect and preservationist", designing elegant homes in the city's Historic District, Ardsley Park, Gordonston and surrounding neighborhoods.

In 1948, St. Matthew's Church, on Savannah's West Broad Street, was completed to a design by Lebey.

In 1950, Lebey designed a building at the eastern corner of East Bay Street and Habersham Street in Savannah after the buildings on the lot were demolished. Lebey's mother-in-law, Pearl H. Gnann, owned several of the buildings that were demolished (one of which was the former home of physician Joseph Clay Habersham Jr.). Lebey's was demolished by 1973, in the year following Gnann's death. She lived at 425 Bull Street, in Monterey Square, directly across West Wayne Street from the historic Mercer House, with her four sons, three daughters, two grandsons and two granddaughters. She had become a widow in 1926. Lee Adler became the homeowner upon Gnann's death in 1972.

In 1973, he was named a fellow of the American Institute of Architects. Eleven years later, he won the Ben Fortson Jr. Award for Civic Beautification and Conservation by Joe Frank Harris, governor of Georgia.

== Notable works ==
- St. Matthew's Church, Savannah, Georgia (1948)

== Personal life ==
Lebey married Louise Gnann (1907–1969) on Christmas Day 1935.

== Death ==
Lebey died in 2002, aged 96. He had become a widower 33 years earlier, and was interred beside his wife in Savannah's historic Bonaventure Cemetery.
