= Augustus Schwaab =

German-born American architect

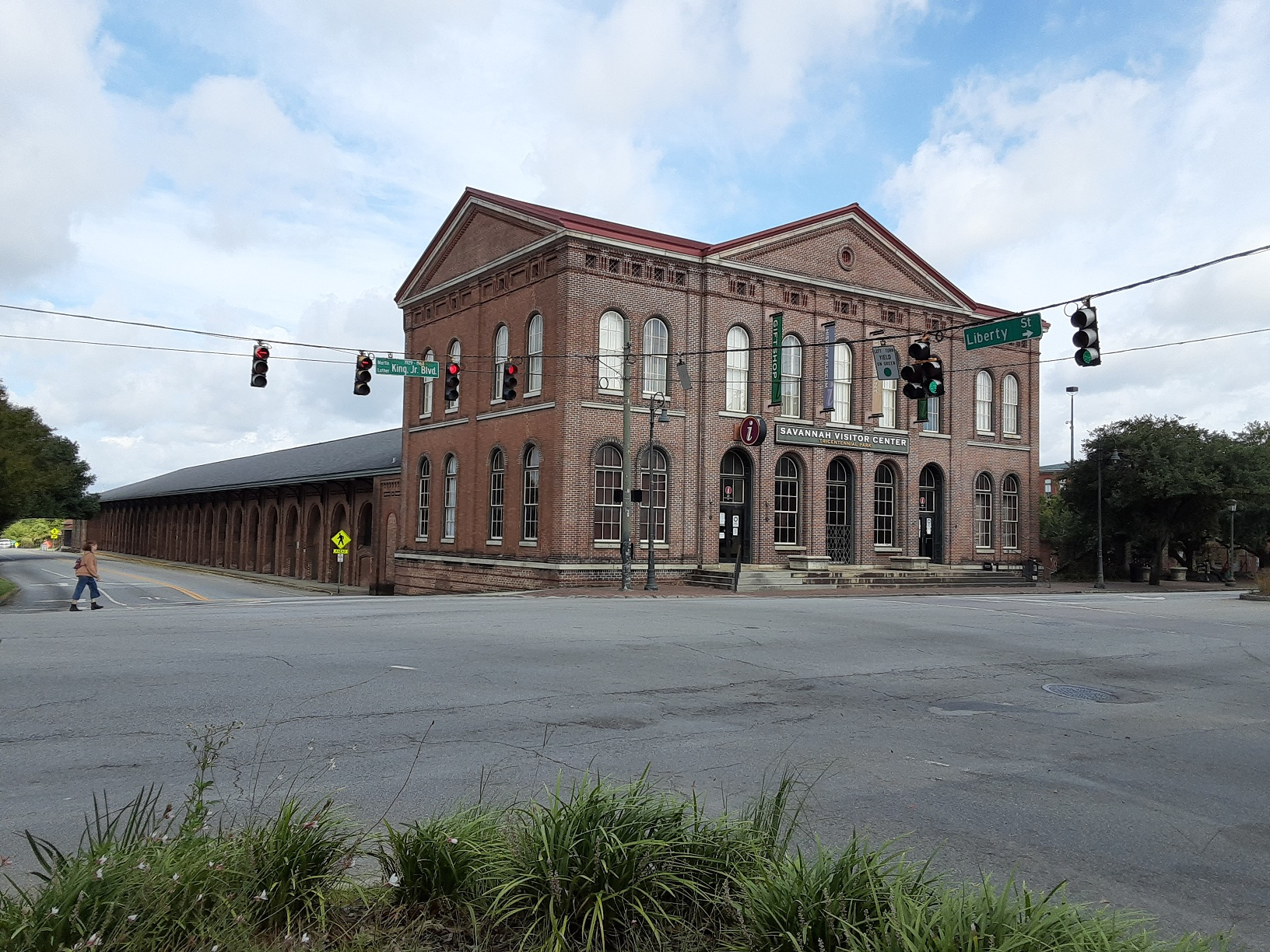
- Schwaab designed the Central of Georgia Depot and Trainshed in 1860
- Born: Carl August Schwaab; May 6, 1823; Germany
- Died: October 30, 1899 (aged 76); Savannah, Georgia, U.S.
- Occupation: Architect
- Design: Central of Georgia Depot and Trainshed, Savannah, Georgia (1860); City Market building, Savannah (1876)

Carl August Schwaab (May 6, 1823 – October 30, 1899), commonly known as Augustus Schwaab, was a German-American architect and civil engineer. He was principally a designer of commercial architecture, best known for his work in Savannah, Georgia, where he worked for around fifty years.

== Early life ==
Schwaab was born in Germany. In July 1844, while living in Neustadt an der Aisch, Schwaab had a daughter, named Elize Auguste Catharine, with Elizabethe Fuchs.

By the early 1850s, Schwaab had moved to the United States, seemingly without Elizabethe and Elize. He married Matilda Vonsinem on October 22, 1853, in Richmond County, Georgia, with whom he had three children: Otto G. (1856–1900), Gustavus Adolph (1860–1940) and Mathilda Bryant (1869–1951). All of the children were born in the U.S.

== Career ==
One of Schwaab's first designs upon arriving in the United States was Savannah's Gray Building (1856), on what was then known as West Broad Street. It is regarded as "one of the finest examples of Greek Revival architecture in Georgia". He followed this up with Central of Georgia Depot and Trainshed.

In 1865, Schwaab was appointed as the chief engineer of the Central Railroad of Georgia. Five years later, he entered into an architectural partnership with fellow German, Martin Philip Muller (1829–1876), with whom he designed the final building to house Savannah's City Market. It was demolished in 1954.

In the summer of 1870, the city council of Savannah asked Schwaab to develop a drainage plan for the city. He presented several alternatives, and "strongly advised against using the Savannah River as the direct outlet", which would have been the cheapest and most efficient option. The city eventually decided to use existing sewer lines to connect with the Bilbo Canal, the course of which ran behind the Atlantic and Gulf Railroad depot to the southeast of Savannah.

By 1874, Schwaab's architectural practice was located at 135 1/2 Bay Street (between Bull Street and Whitaker Street).

The Hampton Depot, in Hampton, Georgia, was the work of Schwaab in 1881. It is now on the National Register of Historic Places.

== Notable works ==
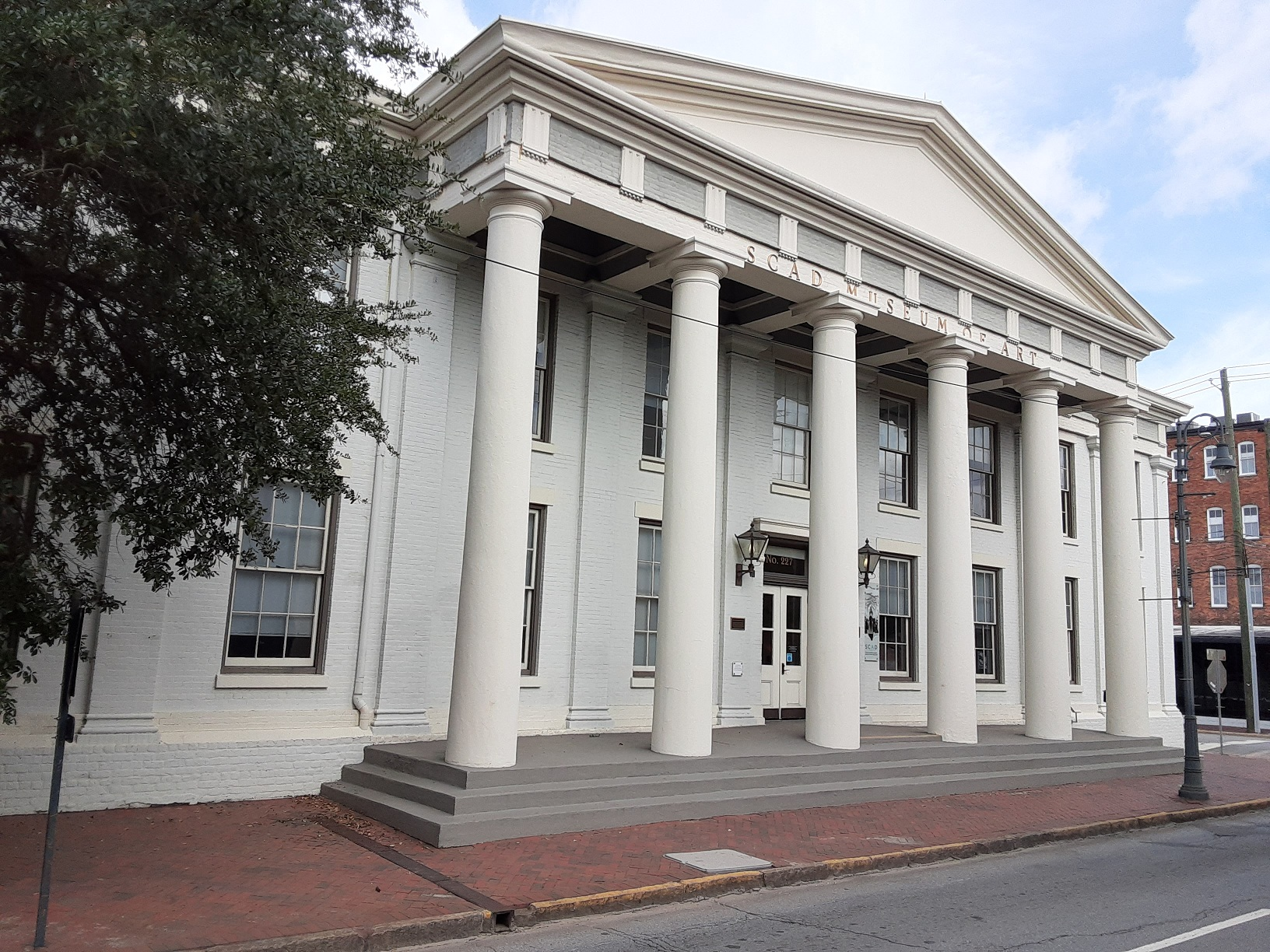
The former Gray Building, now SCAD's Kiah Hall, in the mid-20th century

- Gray Building, Savannah, Georgia (1856)
- Central of Georgia Depot and Trainshed, Savannah, Georgia (1860)
- City Market building, Savannah, Georgia (1876), with Martin Philip Muller
- Hampton Depot, Hampton, Georgia (1881)

== Death ==
Schwaab died on October 30, 1899, aged 76. He was interred in Savannah's Laurel Grove Cemetery on November 1. His family is also buried there. At the time of his death, he was living at 7 Duffy Street.
