= Franco Castelluccio =

American artist (born 1955)

- Born: Francesco Castelluccio; April 12, 1955 (age 69); Newark, New Jersey, U.S.
- Education: Art Students League of New York; School of Visual Arts
- Known for: Sculpting

Francesco Castelluccio (born April 12, 1955) is an American sculptor. He studied anatomy at the Art Students League of New York and the School of Visual Arts, both in New York City.

== Life and career ==
Castelluccio was born to Italian-immigrant parents on April 12, 1955, in Newark, New Jersey. He owns Franco Fine Art Studio in Winter Springs, Florida.

In 2021, Castelluccio completed a bust of Martin Luther King Jr. to mark the opening of the Plant Riverside District in Savannah, Georgia. The work was commissioned by hotelier Richard C. Kessler, at a cost of around $110,000. The bust was approved by King's family, and it was unveiled by his sister-in-law Dr. Naomi King.

== Selected works ==
- The Double Helix-Mutation of Increased Compassion
- 9/11 Pieta
- Martin Luther King Jr. bust (Savannah, Georgia)
