= John H. Deveaux =

American businessman (1848–1909)

- Born: May 10, 1848; Savannah, Georgia, U.S.
- Died: June 9, 1909 (aged 61); Savannah, Georgia, U.S.
- Burial place: Laurel Grove Cemetery, Savannah, Georgia, U.S.
- Occupation: Businessman
- Known for: Co-founder and first editor of the Savannah Tribune

John H. Deveaux (May 10, 1848 – June 9, 1909) was an American publisher and businessman based in Savannah, Georgia. He was the co-founder and first editor of the Colored Tribune, later renamed the Savannah Tribune.

He was also a lieutenant colonel in American Civil War.

== Early life ==
Deveaux was born in 1848 in Savannah, Georgia. In 1864, he was listed as living with Rosa Deveaux and his guardian, Dr. Richard D. Arnold.

== Career ==
Deveaux was commander of the First Battalion, Georgia State Troops, from its foundation, eventually becoming a major. Upon the reorganization of the state militia in 1899, Lieutenant Colonel Deveaux was demoted to major. He was put in charge of call black companies in Georgia. He was later reinstalled as lieutenant colonel.

In 1875, he became the co-founder and first editor of the Colored Tribune in Savannah, Georgia. It was renamed the Savannah Tribune in 1876. He edited the newspaper until 1889, when he moved to a new job as a collector at the Port of Brunswick in Brunswick, Georgia. Sol C. Johnson succeeded him as editor, and became the newspaper's owners upon Deveaux's death.

Deveaux was also Clerk of the Customs House for the Port of Savannah between 1867 and 1868. After his stint in Brunswick, he returned to Savannah as assistant collector in 1896. He operated the port himself during a yellow fever epidemic, for which he was recognized by the Department of Commerce and the Coast Guard for "valor beyond the call of duty".

He was a founder of the Wage Earner Bank.

== Personal life ==
Deveaux married Fannie L. Butts, with whom he had three known children: Anna, John Jr. and Rosa.

He was a lifelong member of St. Matthew's Episcopal Church in Savannah and was the third Grand Master of the Georgia chapter of the Prince Hall Masons, which he helped establish.

== Death ==
Deveaux died at his home in Savannah in 1909, aged 61. He was interred in Savannah's Laurel Grove Cemetery. His widow was buried beside him upon her death 27 years later.
