= Kiah Hall =

Historic building in Savannah, Georgia

- SCAD Museum of Art
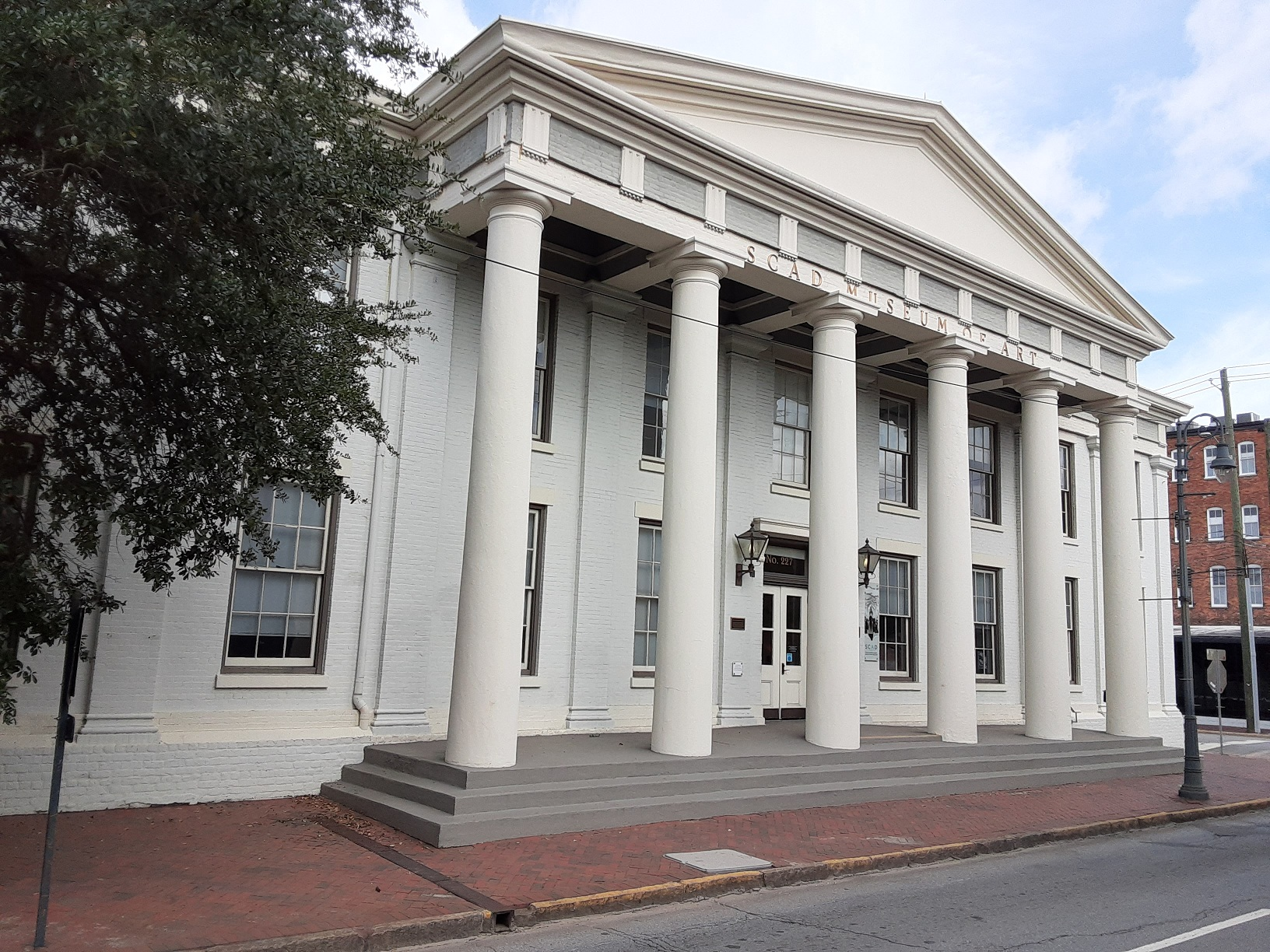
- The building in 2021
- Interactive map of the Kiah Hall area
- Former names: Gray Building (1856–1993)

General information
- Architectural style: Greek revival
- Location: Savannah, Georgia, U.S., 227 Martin Luther King Jr. Blvd.
- Coordinates: 32.07733°N 81.09875°W
- Completed: 1856 (170 years ago)

Design and construction
- Architect: Augustus Schwaab

Kiah Hall is a building in Savannah, Georgia, United States. Located on Martin Luther King Jr. Boulevard. Regarded as "one of the finest examples of Greek Revival architecture in Georgia", it is one of the original 1856 buildings of the country's only intact Antebellum Period railroad facility. Formerly named the Gray Building, of Savannah's Central of Georgia Railroad depot, it was designated a National Historic Landmark in 1976. It was home of the Savannah College of Art and Design (SCAD) Museum of Art until 2011.

== History ==
Originally conceived as a major trade post for Savannah, the railroad complex was occupied by Union troops at the close of the Civil War. In the early 20th century, the area surrounding much of the Central of Georgia Railroad buildings emerged as an important African-American commercial district and cultural hub, and remained so through the middle of the century. Despite its prime location and significant pedigree, however, the complex was beset by five decades of neglect and, by the late 20th century, the depot and its Savannah gray brick lay in ruins.

In 1992, SCAD acquired the deteriorating former railroad headquarters and began renovations. A year later, the building was dedicated to Virginia Jackson Kiah (1911–2001), a member of SCAD's Board of Trustees between 1987 and 1997 and a pioneering African-American female artist.

== Gallery ==
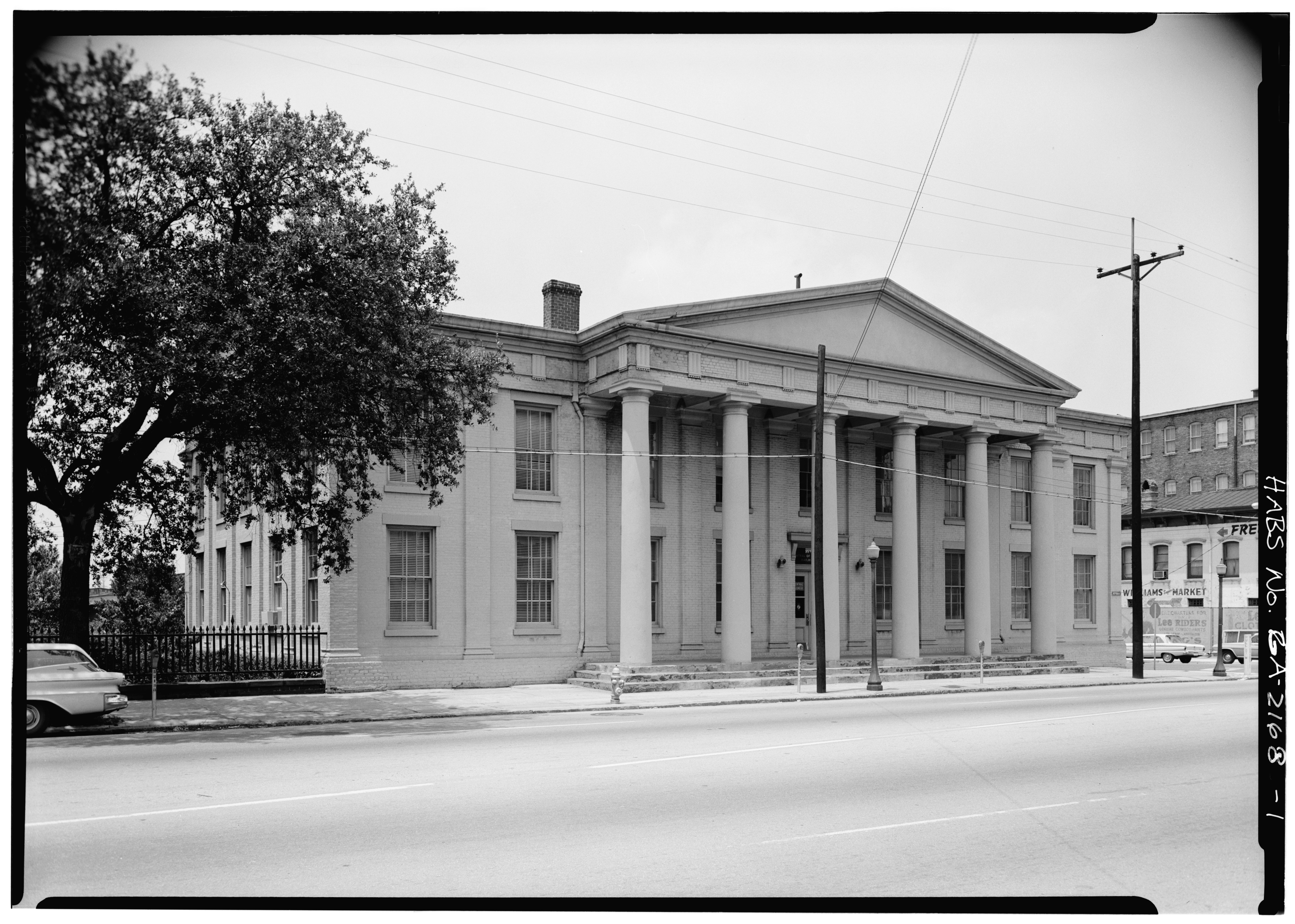
The building in the mid-20th century

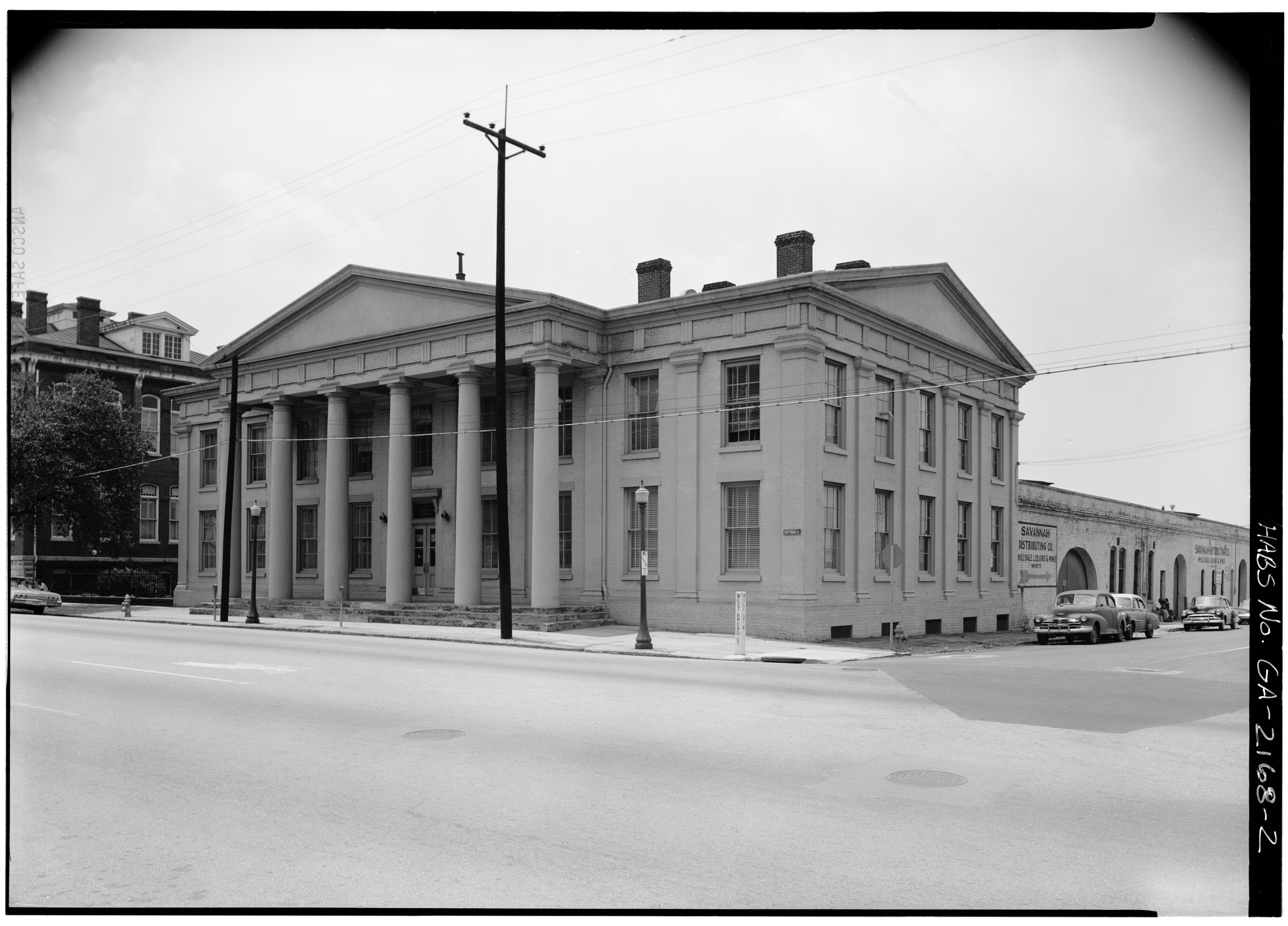
Eastern façade and northern wall, on West Turner Blvd.

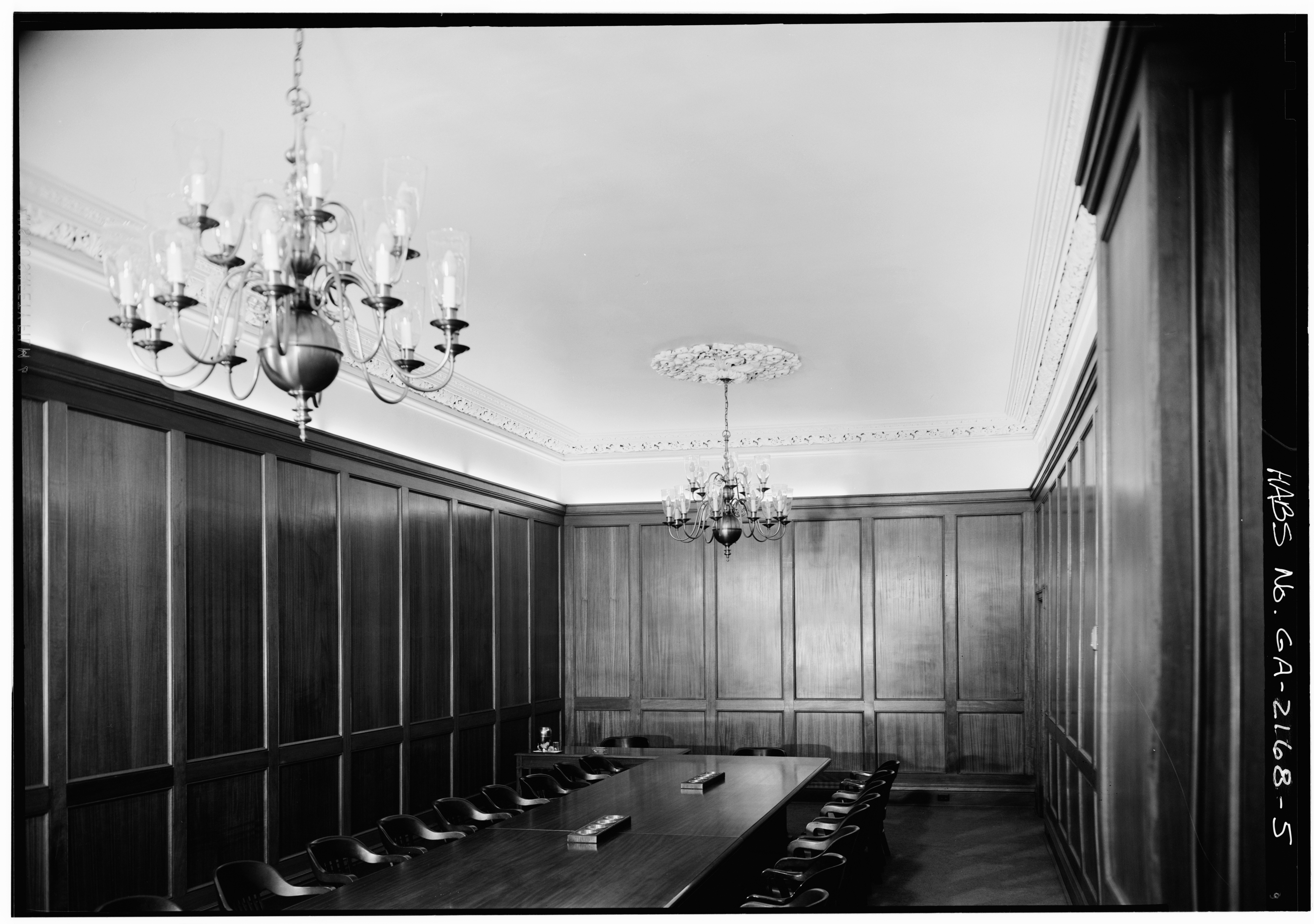
Second-floor board room

== See also ==
- Buildings in Savannah Historic District
