= St. Matthew's Church (Savannah, Georgia) =

St. Matthew's
- St. Matthew's
- 32.063657°N 81.103866°W
- Location: 1401 Martin Luther King Boulevard; Savannah, Georgia
- Country: United States
- Denomination: Episcopal Church
- Website: www.stmattsav.org

History
- Founded: 1855 (171 years ago)

Architecture
- Architect: John C. Lebey
- Completed: 1948 (78 years ago)

Administration
- Province: Province IV
- Diocese: Episcopal Diocese of Georgia

St. Matthew's is an Episcopal church at 1401 Martin Luther King Jr. Boulevard in Savannah, Georgia. The church building, which was completed in 1948, was designed in the Greek Revival style by John C. Lebey (1905–2002). An addition to the rear was completed in 1992, designed by William B. Haynes.

In 2015, the church reported 267 members; in 2023, it reported 260 members. No membership statistics were reported in 2024 national parochial reports. Plate and pledge financial support reported by the church in 2024 was $0.00; in 2023 it had been $143,370. Average Sunday Attendance (ASA) reported in 2023 was 49 persons. This was a relative decrease on ASA of 81 in 2018. Attendance reported in 2024 was zero persons.

== History ==
Its membership was formed in 1855, when nine free blacks organized a congregation in a bakery at the corner of Perry Lane and Habersham Street in Savannah. In 1943, a merging of St. Stephen's Episcopal, on Troup Square, with St. Augustine's Episcopal on what was then named West Broad Street (today's Martin Luther King Jr. Boulevard) resulted in today's congregation. Its first rector was the Reverend Gustave H. Caution, who served until his retirement in 1969.

In John Berendt's 1994 book Midnight in the Garden of Good and Evil, the Lady Chablis describes St. Matthew's as "Savannah's black status church." In her autobiography, Hiding My Candy (1996), she describes it as "that black palace of status worship here in Savannah, where people act like uptown wannabe white folks."

== See also ==
- Episcopal Diocese of Georgia
- John H. Deveaux (1848–1909), lifelong member
