= Savannah Union Station =

Former railway station in Savannah, Georgia, United States

Coordinates: 32.074°N 81.099°W

- Postcard c. 1910

General information
- Line: Atlantic Coast Line Railroad

Construction
- Architect: Frank Pierce Milburn
- Architectural style: Spanish Renaissance and Elizabethian styles

History
- Opened: 1902; 124 years ago
- Closed: 1962; 64 years ago

Former services
| Preceding station | Atlantic Coast Line Railroad | Following station |
|---|---|---|
| Georgetown toward Tampa | Main Line | Hardeeville toward Richmond |
| Preceding station | Seaboard Air Line Railroad | Following station |
| Interstate toward Tampa or Miami | Main Line | Clyo toward Richmond |
| Terminus | East Carolina Line | Pritchard toward Hamlet |
| Meldrim toward Montgomery | Montgomery – Savannah | Terminus |
| Preceding station | Southern Railway | Following station |
| Hardeeville toward Charlotte | Charlotte – Savannah | Terminus |
Location

Savannah Union Station was a train station in Savannah, Georgia. It was located at 419–435 West Broad Street, between Stewart and Roberts Streets. It incorporated the Atlantic Coast Line Railroad, the Seaboard Air Line Railroad and the Southern Railway. While the term, union station, in the United States generally implies a station that hosts all train companies stopping in a city, the Central of Georgia and the Savannah and Atlanta Railway used other stations in Savannah.

== Architecture ==
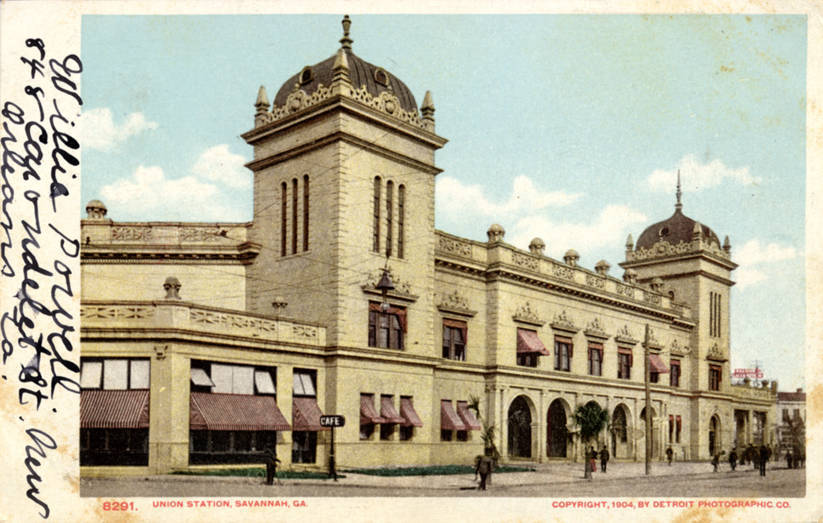
Exterior view of Union Station, 1904

It was designed by Columbia, South Carolina, architect Frank Pierce Milburn and completed in 1902 at a cost of $150,000. It was an example of Spanish Renaissance and Elizabethian styles. The main feature of the structure was an octagonal rotunda which measured 80 feet in diameter and served as the general waiting room. Since most of the station's history took place under the South's Jim Crow segregation system, a colored waiting room was assigned to African-Americans.

The exterior walls were made of pressed brick with granite and terra cotta trimmings. The building also had two towers.

== Significance and history ==
Many visitors disembarked trains onto West Broad Street. They brought enough business for theaters, bars, stores to open in that section of town. For decades, the Union Station and its surroundings became known as the economic and cultural center for Black Savannah.

In August 1962 the remaining passenger trains were shifted to the new Atlantic Coast Line station on the periphery of Savannah, which remains in use today by Amtrak. A year later, Union Station was demolished to make room for Interstate 16 and what would eventually be known as the Earl T. Shinhoster Interchange.

=== Named trains ===
Several named trains made stops at the station:

| Operators | Named trains | Northern destination | Southern destination |
|---|---|---|---|
| Atlantic Coast Line Railroad (train continued later under Amtrak) | Champion | New York, New York | St. Petersburg, Florida and Miami, Florida |
| Atlantic Coast Line Railroad | Everglades | Washington, D.C. | Jacksonville, Florida |
| Atlantic Coast Line Railroad | Havana Special | New York, New York | Tampa, Florida and Miami, Florida |
| Atlantic Coast Line Railroad (train continued later under Amtrak) | Palmetto (ACL train) | New York, New York | terminus |
| Seaboard Air Line Railroad | Palmland | New York, New York | Tampa, Florida and Miami, Florida |
| Seaboard Air Line Railroad (train continued later under Amtrak) | Silver Meteor | New York, New York | Miami, Florida |
| Seaboard Air Line Railroad | Sunland | Washington, D.C. and Portsmouth, Virginia | Tampa, Florida |
| Seaboard Air Line Railroad | Tidewater | Portsmouth, Virginia | Jacksonville, Florida |
| Southern Railway | Skyland Special | Asheville, North Carolina | Jacksonville, Florida |

== Current use of the site ==
An Enmark service station (405 Martin Luther King, Jr. Blvd) is located nearby what was once the site of the Union Station.

The Savannah Visitor Information Center is in the former Central of Georgia Depot and Trainshed, located nearby, at 301 Martin Luther King, Jr. Blvd.

== See also ==
- Central of Georgia Depot and Trainshed (Savannah, Georgia), station for CG trains to Atlanta
- Savannah station (Amtrak), the current train station for Savannah
