= Richard C. Kessler =

American hotelier and real-estate developer

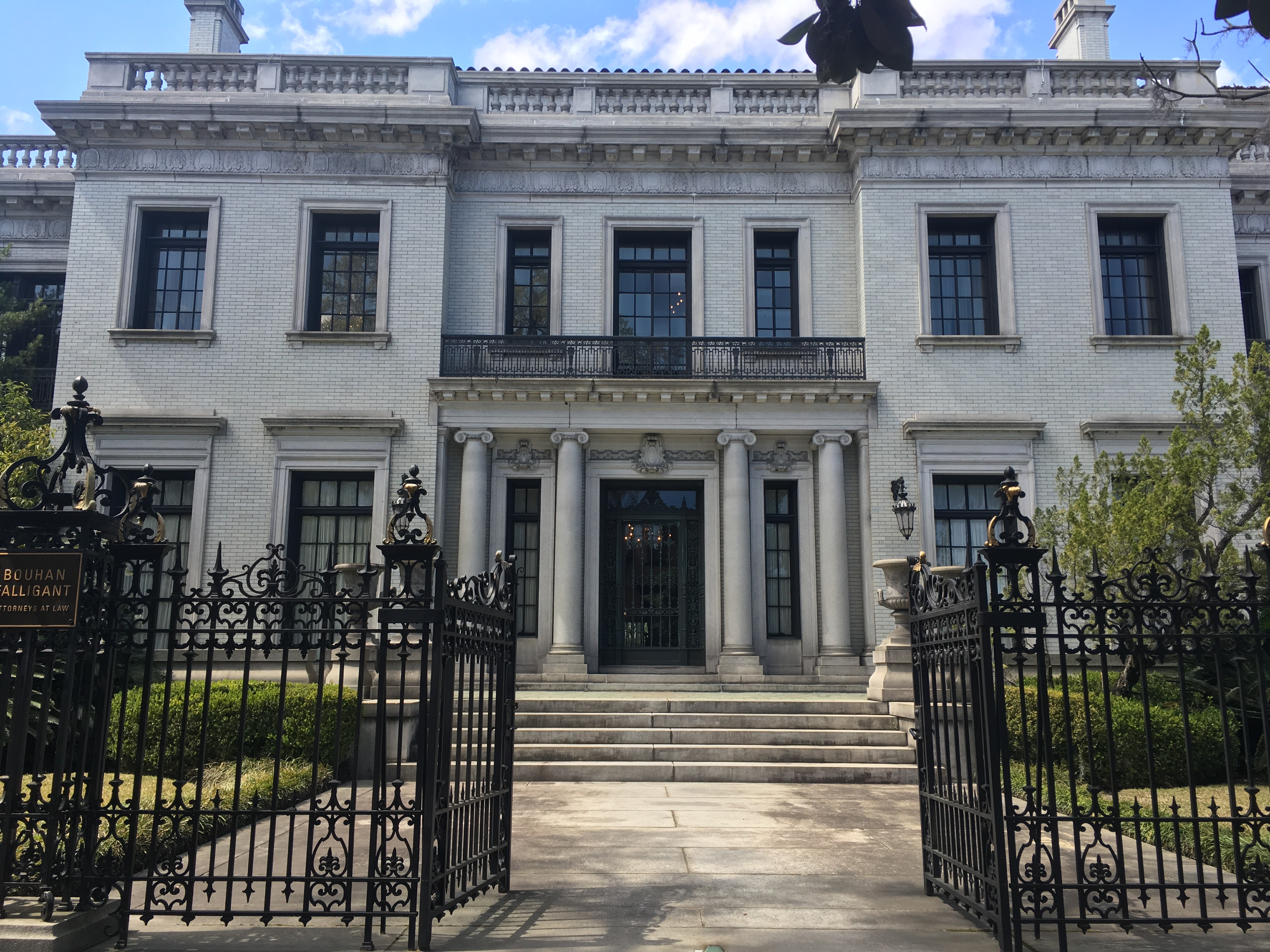
- The Armstrong Kessler Mansion, which Kessler purchased in 2017
- Born: Savannah, Georgia
- Known for: Chairman and CEO of hotel companies

Richard C. Kessler is an entrepreneur in the field of hotel development and operations. Kessler has been chairman and CEO of The Kessler Enterprise, Inc. since 1984. He is also the former chairman, president, and CEO of Days Inn of America, Inc.

In 1984, Kessler founded The Kessler Enterprise which consists of several wholly owned subsidiaries consisting of development and operational companies. Some of these projects include The Kessler Collection of themed hotels and resorts, the 500-acre Silverwood Plantation residential community, the 1,000-acre Georgia North International Industrial Park, and commercial land developments, including Plant Riverside District.

== Personal history ==
Kessler was born in Savannah, Georgia and is a descendant of the Salzburgers, a group of Lutherans from Salzburg (Austria) who came to America in 1732 seeking religious freedom.

Kessler holds bachelor's and master's degrees in industrial engineering and operations research from the Georgia Institute of Technology. He is married to Martha Jane Wilson of Durham, N.C. The couple has two grown children, Mark and Laura, and three grandchildren.

At the age of 23, Kessler became the right hand to real estate developer Cecil B. Day and help found Days Inn of America in August 1970. From 1972 to 1975, Kessler founded and led five real estate development and operational companies. In May 1975, at age 29, Kessler became president and CEO of Days Inn, and one year later, chairman. The chain was sold in 1984 and Kessler began his own independent ventures.

== Philanthropy ==
=== Georgia Tech Plaza / The Campanile ===
In the early 1990s, Kessler led the committee effort which designed and created the "Tech Plaza" in the heart of Georgia Tech's campus. He then commissioned the Kessler Campanile, a $450,000 carillon created by Atlanta artist Richard Hill. The 80 foot, stainless steel high tech tower is positioned in a 100-inch diameter fountain and an assortment of 100 different songs chime on the quarter-hour.

During the 1996 Olympics, the set of NBC's "Today Show" was centered directly in front of the Campanile, providing international exposure.

=== Kessler scholarships ===
The Kessler family has established the Excellence in Teaching Art & Music, Orange scholarship.
