= Plant Riverside District =

Mixed-use development in Savannah, Georgia, USA

Coordinates: 32°5′2″N 81°5′48″W

Plant Riverside District is a mixed-use development in Savannah, Georgia, United States. Located on the west end of historic River Street, the development opened in 2020 after several years of construction. A JW Marriott hotel anchors the development, which incorporates the original 1912 power plant as well as an extended riverwalk into the overall design.

== History ==
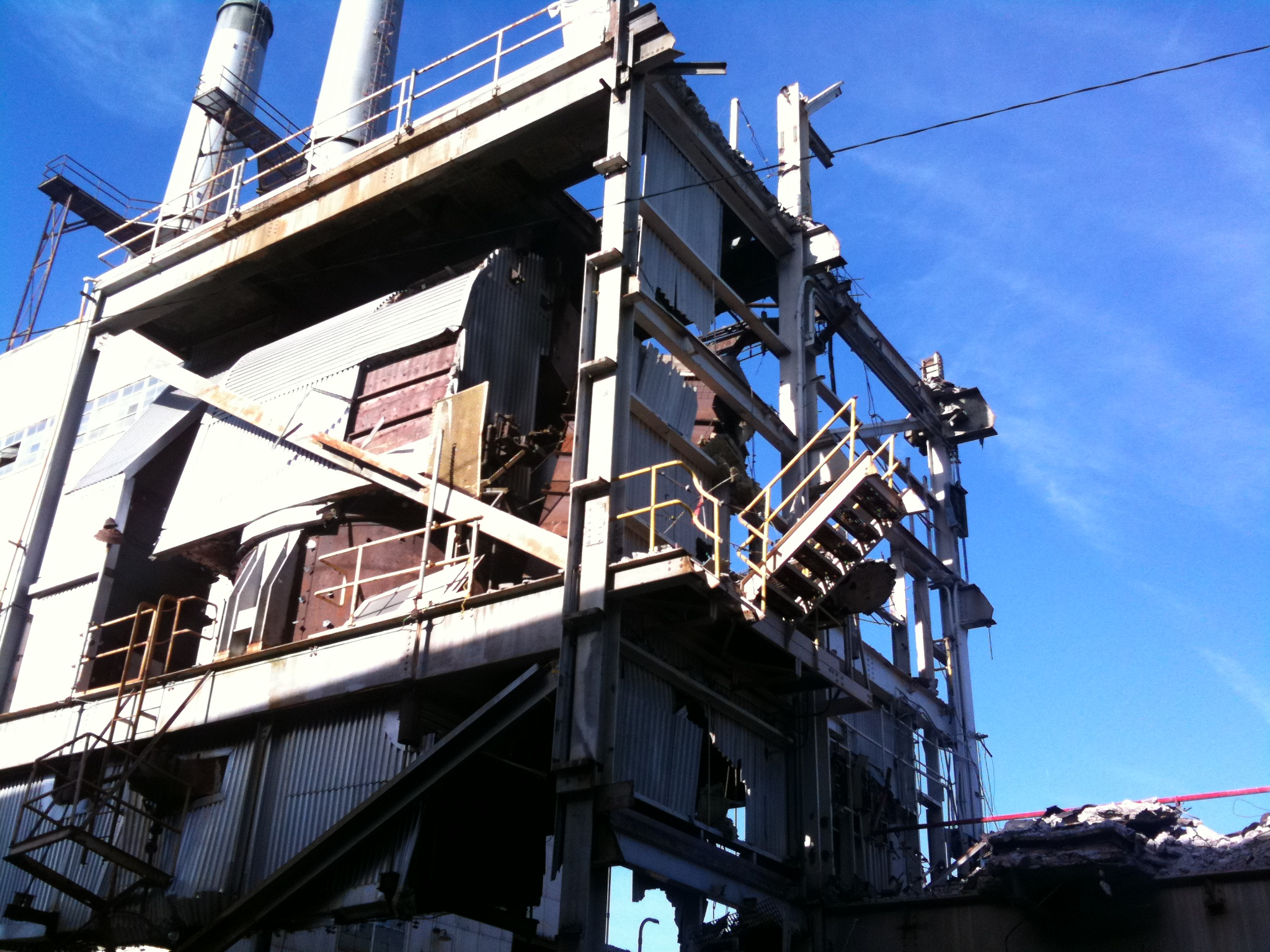
Plant Riverside in disrepair, viewed from River Street in January 2010.

The development was the idea of Richard C. Kessler, the CEO of Kessler Enterprises, who, in the 2010s envisioned a large-scale redevelopment of the west end of Savannah's River Street. In August 2019, a large job fair was held to fill approximately 700 job openings. On July 29, 2020, the district was officially opened with a large ribbon-cutting ceremony that included speeches from Georgia Lieutenant Governor Geoff Duncan and Savannah Mayor Van R. Johnson. According to a press release issued by Kessler, this opening constituted the end of Phase I of the development. The second and final phase officially opened in October 2021. The development consists of a JW Marriott hotel alongside multiple dining and retail outlets.

In 2021, Plant Riverside District was honored by the Congress for the New Urbanism, the Urban Land Institute and Historic Savannah Foundation for excellence in urban design and historic preservation. The complex also earned a 2021 Georgia Trust Historic Preservation Award for Excellence in Rehabilitation. Also in 2021, Plant Riverside District opened District Live, a new live music venue that is part of a special partnership with Live Nation, bringing national artists to Savannah's Entertainment District throughout the year. Plant Riverside District hosts special events year-round including the Shamrocks and Shenanigans St. Patrick's Day Celebration, Savannah Stars and Stripes July 4 Weekend and the Savannah Christmas Market.

=== Martin Luther King Jr. Monument ===
As part of the development, a monument honoring Martin Luther King Jr. was proposed. The monument, located in a waterfront park in the district, would stand approximately 8 feet (2.4 m) tall and consist of a granite pedestal with engravings on its four sides, topped by a bust of King overlooking the Savannah River. The bust was commissioned from artist Franco Castelluccio, with Kessler paying the $113,540 cost of the monument. By 2021, the pedestal had been completed and put in place. The bust of King, which was approved by the King family and is the first memorial to the late Civil Rights leader in Savannah, was officially unveiled on January 15, 2022, with Dr. Naomi King, sister-in-law of Martin Luther King, Jr., addressing the audience, as well as Richard C. Kessler and Savannah Mayor Van Johnson.
