= Georgia State Railroad Museum =

- Central of Georgia Railway: Savannah Shops and Terminal Facilities
- U.S. National Register of Historic Places
- U.S. National Historic Landmark District
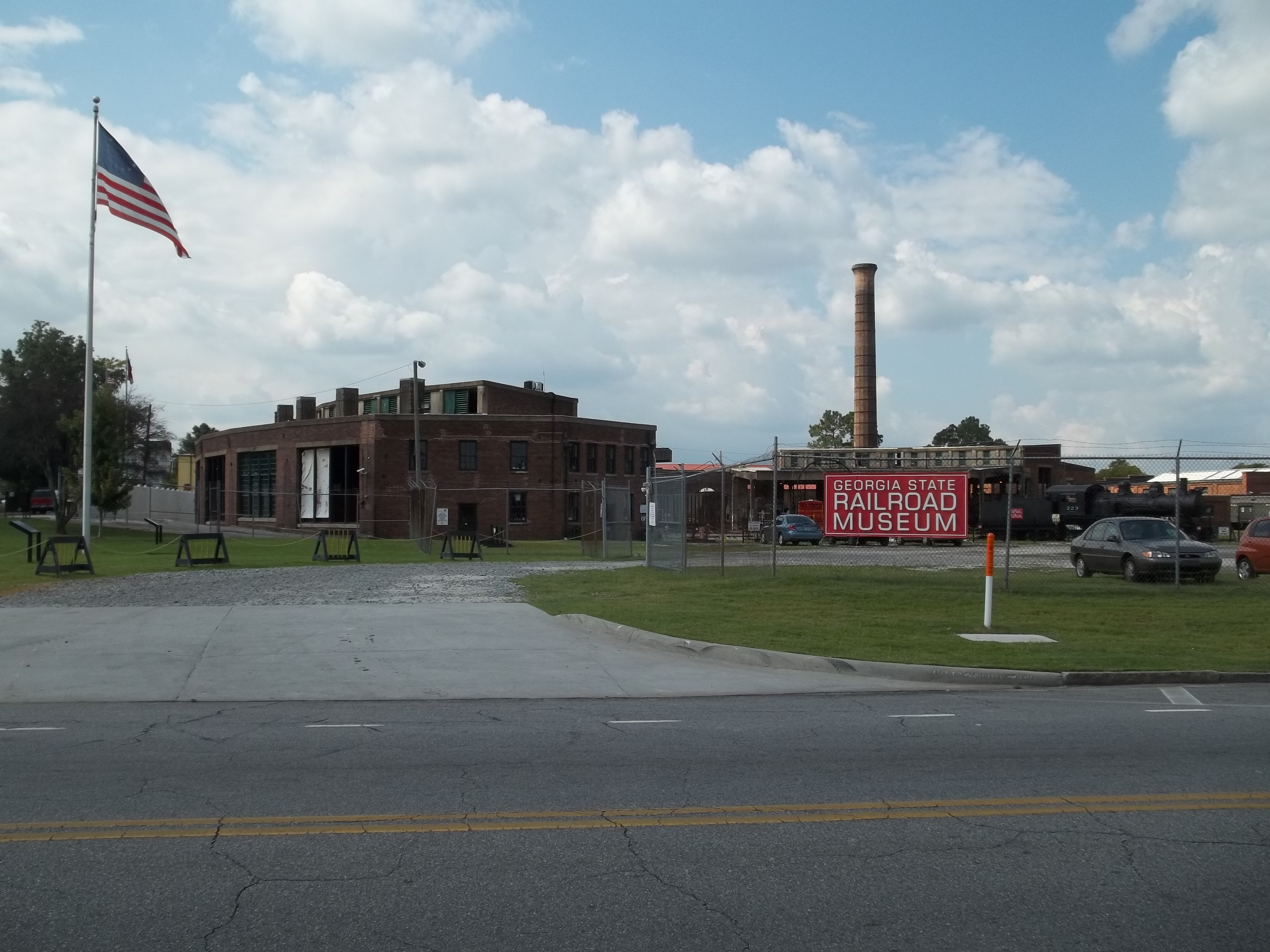
- Entrance to the Georgia State Railroad Museum at the former Central of Georgia Railway: Savannah Shops and Terminal Facilities

- Location within Georgia Location within the United States
- Location: West Broad Street and Railroad Avenue; Savannah, Georgia
- Coordinates: 32.07571°N 81.10126°W
- Area: 33.2 acres (13.4 ha)
- Built: 1853
- Architect: Augustus Schwaab; Et al.
- Architectural style: Late 19th and 20th Century Revivals, Late Victorian
- NRHP reference No.: 78000970

Significant dates
- Added to NRHP: June 2, 1978
- Designated NHLD: June 2, 1978

The Georgia State Railroad Museum (formerly the Roundhouse Railroad Museum) is a museum in Savannah, Georgia, located at a historic Central of Georgia Railway site. It includes parts of the Central of Georgia Railway: Savannah Shops and Terminal Facilities National Historic Landmark District. The complex is considered the most complete antebellum railroad complex in the United States. The museum, located at 655 Louisville Road, is part of a historic district included in the National Register of Historic Places.

The museum is across the street from the Central of Georgia Depot and Trainshed, also part of the historic district. The complex was constructed in 1853 by the Central of Georgia Railway (CofG) before the outbreak of the American Civil War. Savannah Shops and terminal buildings were declared a National Historic Landmark in 1976, a listing which was expanded in 1978 to include additional buildings in the complex.

The historic railroad structures at the Georgia State Railroad Museum site include a partial roundhouse with operating turntable, partial machine shop, Tender Frame Shop, Blacksmith Shop, Boiler House, Storehouse & Print Shop, Lumber and Planing Sheds, Coach and Paint Shops, and a partial Carpentry Shop which now houses Savannah Children's Museum. Many of these structures are open for visitors to explore.

== Description ==
The Historic Railroad Shops complex is among the finest remaining examples of Victorian railroad architecture and design and is the most intact antebellum railroad repair complex in the country. It was designated a National Historic Landmark by the National Park Service. On-site displays include antique shaft driven machinery, locomotives and railroad stock, model train layouts, an operating turntable, and the oldest portable steam engine in the United States. The Historic Railroad Shops offers a valuable educational experience for students and has also become a popular local tourist attraction.

The complex has been maintained as the Georgia State Railroad Museum and a general industry museum by the Coastal Heritage Society with the assistance of the City of Savannah.

== Site history ==
The Central of Georgia Railroad started as the Central Rail Road and Canal Company in 1833, and built a passenger station, freight terminal and some shops in the Louisville Road area of Savannah around 1836. However, none of those structures remain today. By the mid-1840s the railway had expanded to 190 miles (310 km) of track, and the CG began construction of new shops in 1851. The first completed building was the carpenters' shop in 1853, followed by the original roundhouse, machine shop, tender frame shop, blacksmith shop and several other buildings in 1855. Additional buildings were constructed at the complex into the 1920s.

The roundhouse, turntable and other structures were rebuilt in the late 1920s after a major fire in 1923, as well as to accommodate larger locomotives and rolling stock. Passenger trains operated to the Central of Georgia Depot until 1971.

In 1989 during the filming of Glory, City Manager Don Mendonsa and Historic Savannah President Gordon Matthews toured the site. Troop were there in uniform ready for filming. Gordon suggested to Don that Scott Smith, who had led the restoration of nearby Ft. Jackson, had the talent and experience to begin the restoration project. At that point a sign on a wall identification of the two drinking water stations - one for whites and one for black. SCAD students had crawled under fences to use many of the walls for graffiti then. Scott brought his blend of historian, engineer, communicator to then start the project with the support of the City of Savannah.

== Transition to museum ==
The Southern Railway purchased the CG in 1963 and closed the Savannah shops. Subsequently, the railway transferred the complex to the City of Savannah. The Coastal Heritage Society, a non-profit organization, opened the museum on the site in 1989.

== Museum facilities ==
Museum attractions include:

- Massive roundhouse with an operating turntable (length 85 feet (26 m))
- Numerous historic railroad buildings
- Historic machinery and stationary steam engines
- Steam and diesel
- Office cars and cabooses.
- Daily tours and activities, sometimes including a short site tour by rail.
- Model railroad

== Gallery ==
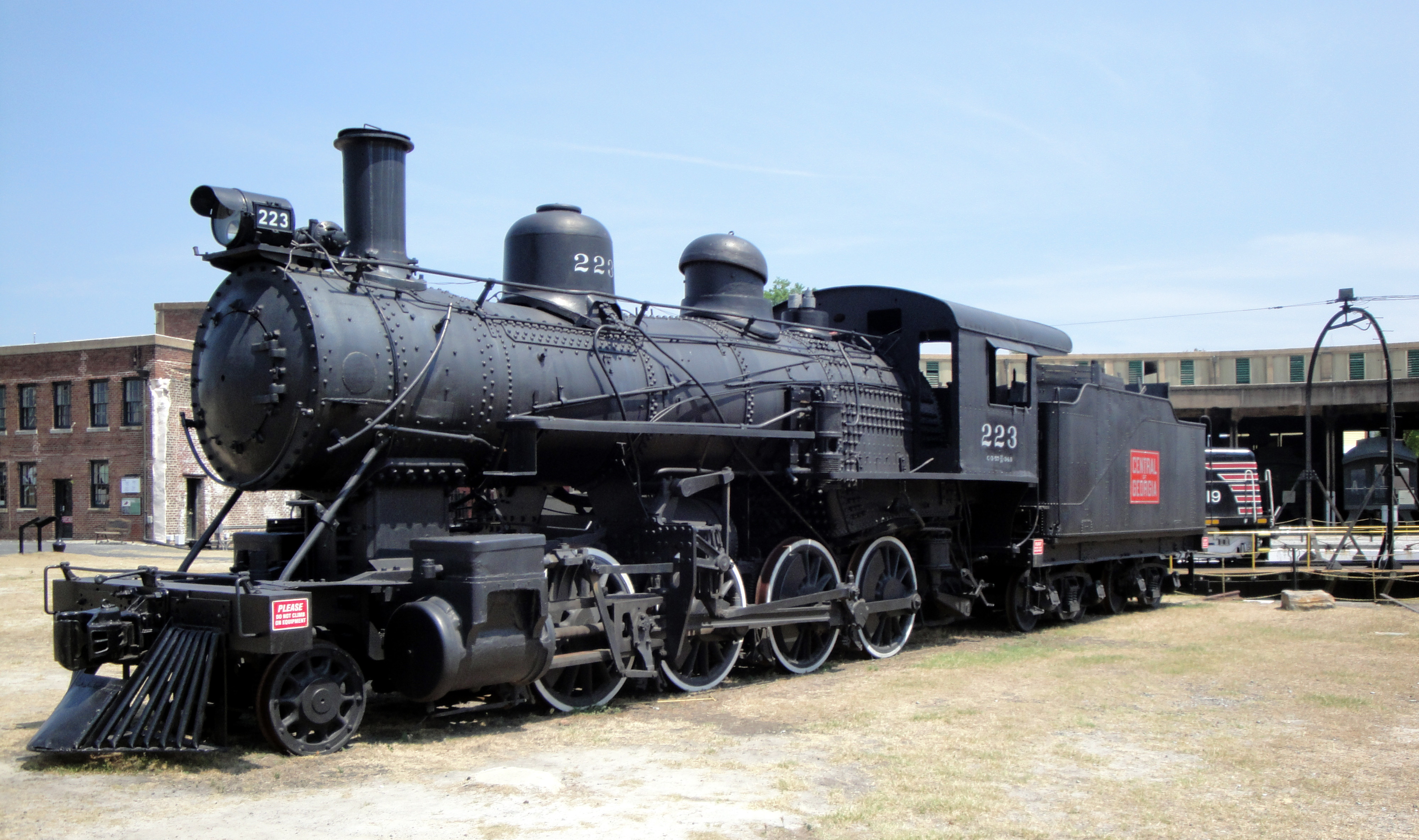
CG locomotive no. 223 in front of the roundhouse. The locomotive is a Baldwin C-3 class 2-8-0, built 1907, ended service 1952.

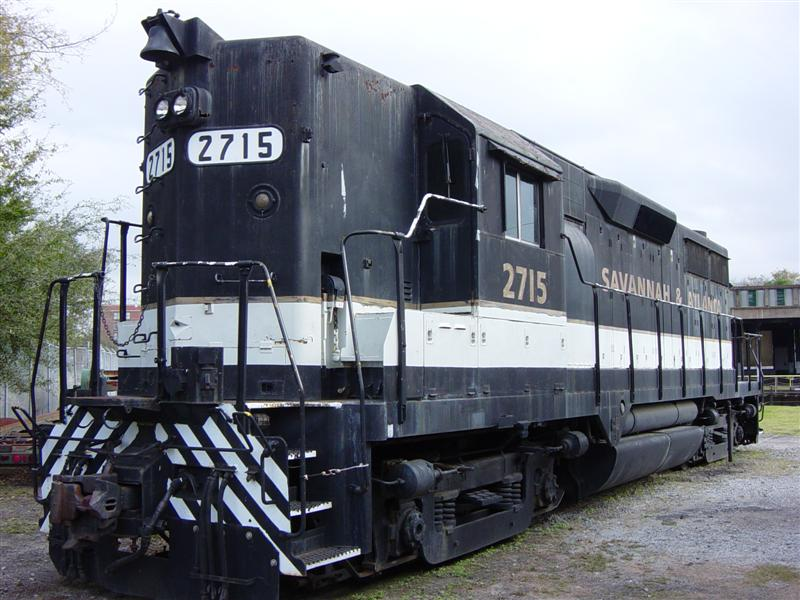
EMD GP35 diesel locomotive #2715, a former S&A locomotive on display at the Historic Railroad Shops, November 26, 2003

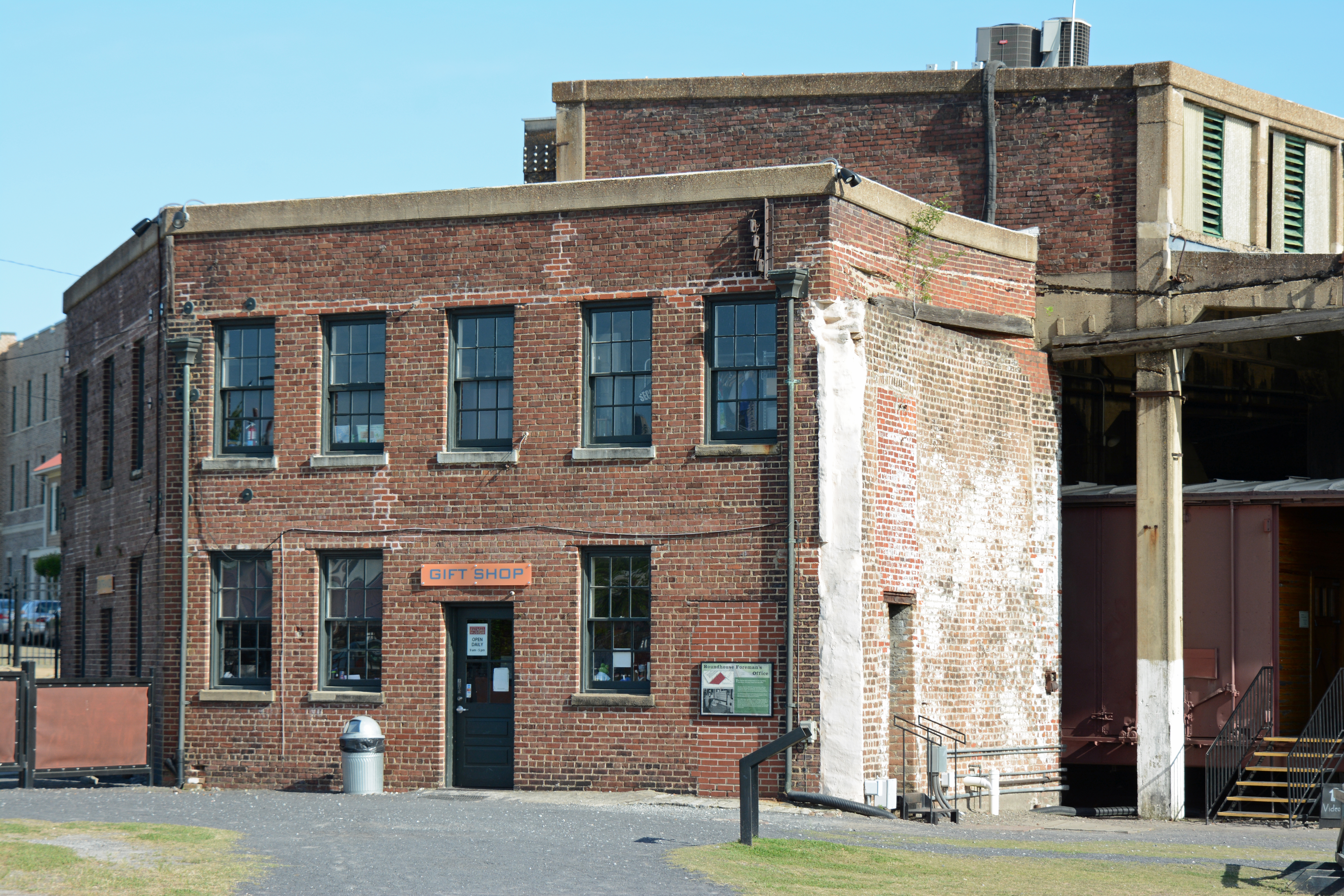
Central of Georgia Railway Museum

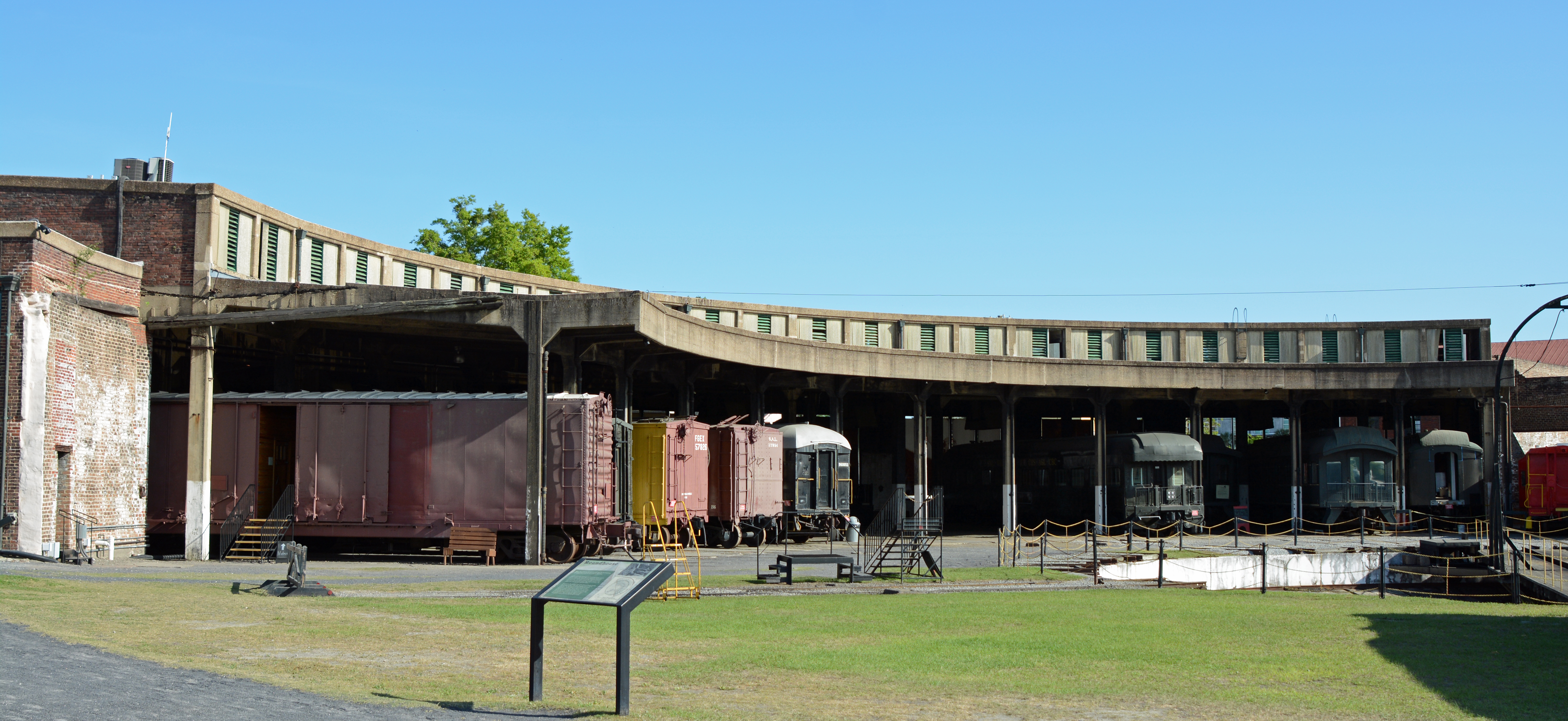
The roundhouse in 2015

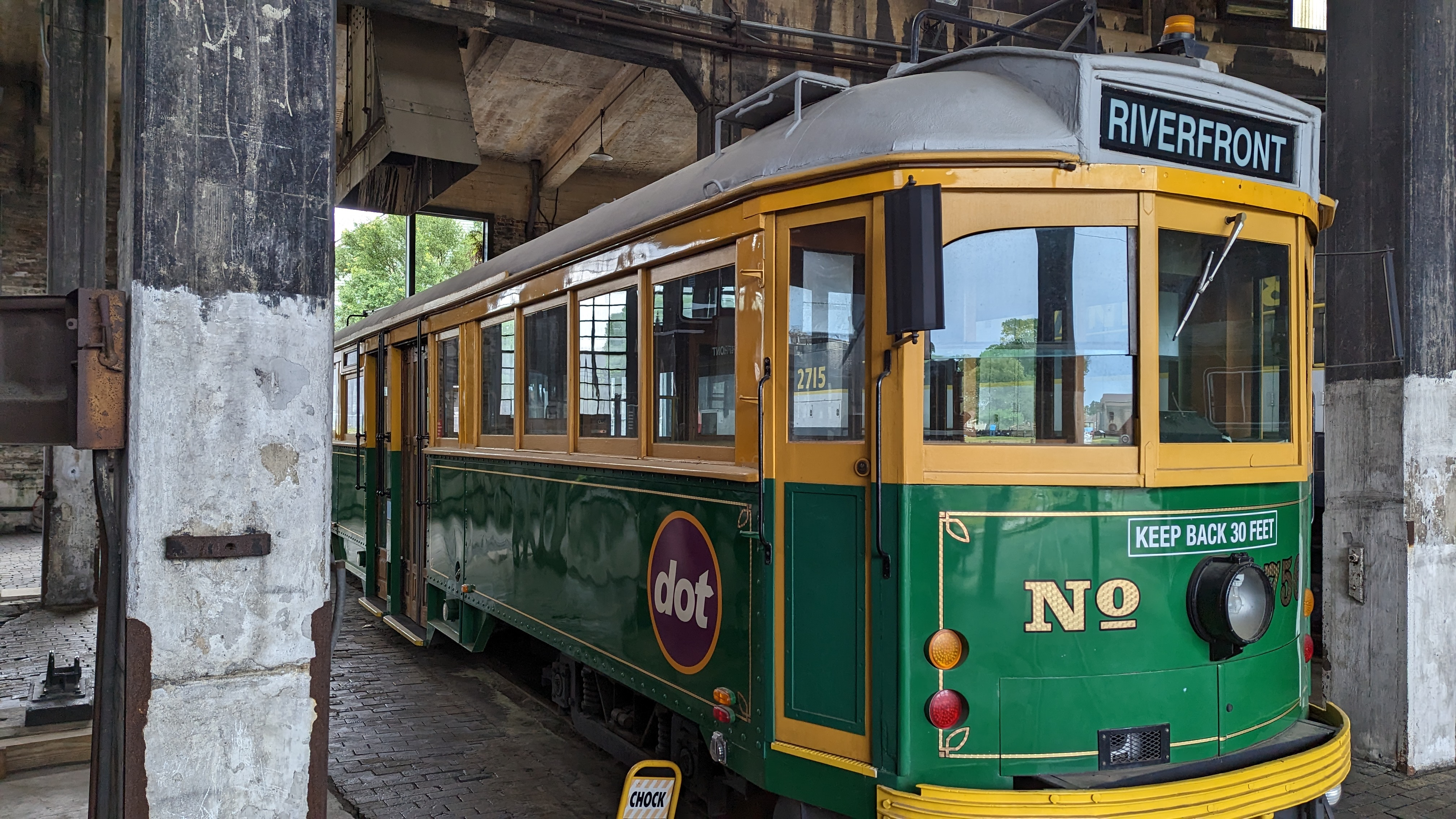
Ex MMTB W5 756 being housed at the Central of Georgia RR Museum.

== See also ==
- Central of Georgia Railway Company Shop Property
- List of National Historic Landmarks in Georgia (U.S. state)
- National Register of Historic Places listings in Chatham County, Georgia
