= Martin Luther King Jr. Boulevard (Savannah) =

Prominent street in Savannah, Georgia

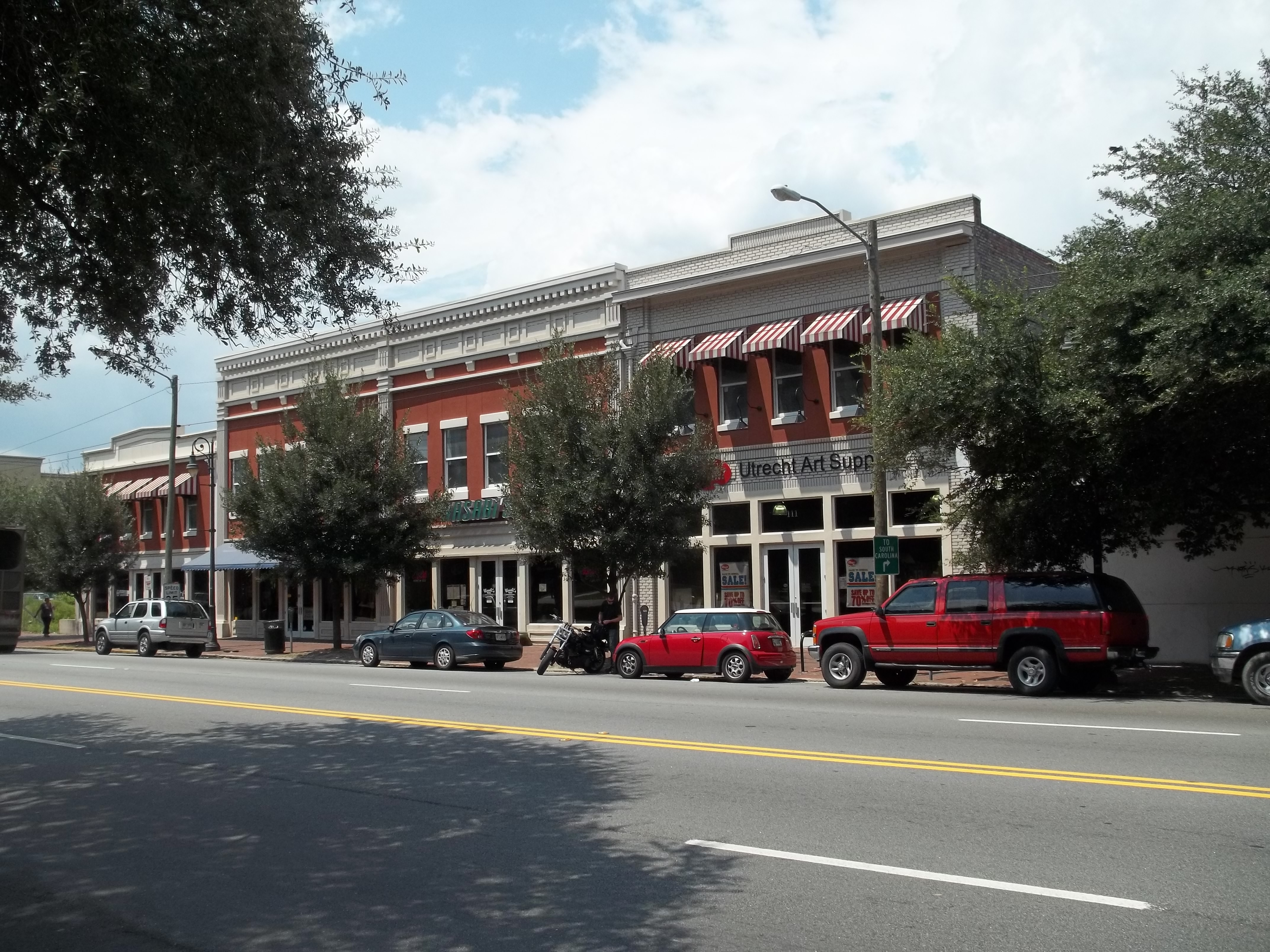
- A 2011 view
- Former name: West Broad Street
- Part of: SR 25
- Namesake: Martin Luther King Jr.
- Length: 2.48 mi (3.99 km)
- Location: Savannah, Georgia, U.S.
- North end: West River Street
- South end: Exchange Street

Martin Luther King Jr. Boulevard is a prominent street in Savannah, Georgia, United States. Located to the west of Montgomery Street, at the western edge of Savannah's downtown, it runs for about 2.48 miles (3.99 km) from West River Street in the north to Exchange Street in the south. Originally called West Broad Street, it was renamed for Martin Luther King Jr. in 1991. A memorial bust of King Jr., designed by Italian sculptor Franco Castelluccio and approved by his family, was officially unveiled at Martin Luther King Jr. Park in Savannah's Plant Riverside District on January 15, 2022. The memorial is located at the northern terminus of the boulevard, overlooking the Savannah River.

The section between West Bay Street and West Oglethorpe Avenue is part of State Route 25.

The street's northern section passes through the Savannah Historic District, a National Historic Landmark District.

The Savannah Tribune formerly had its offices on West Broad Street.

== Frogtown ==
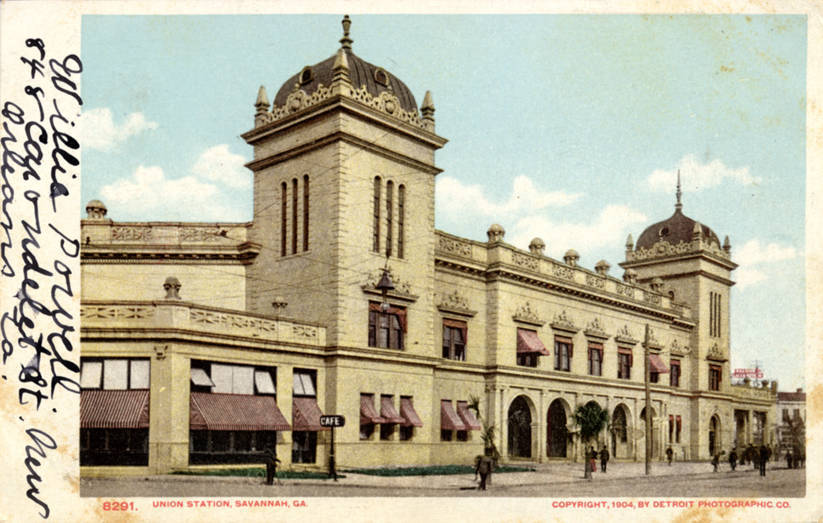
Savannah's Union Station at the turn of the 20th century. It was demolished in 1963

After the American Civil War, freed slaves began to settle in the area, which had become known as Frogtown, due to the proliferation of frogs that appeared in the neighborhood after rains. It became a thriving black business district, with movie theaters, markets, grocery stores, funeral homes, shoe repair, tailors, insurance companies and financial institutions; in the 1960s, however, an overpass was built, connecting the eastern terminus of Interstate 16 to Montgomery Street. This negatively affected trade. Savannah's Union Station, which once stood on what was then West Broad Street, was demolished in 1963 as part of the development. The area is now known as an Enterprise Zone, with the City of Savannah offering financial incentives to businesses that opt to invest in the area via land improvement and/or the creation of jobs.

It is believed Savannah singer/songwriter Johnny Mercer used to visit West Broad Street to listen to "race" music.

== Notable buildings and structures ==
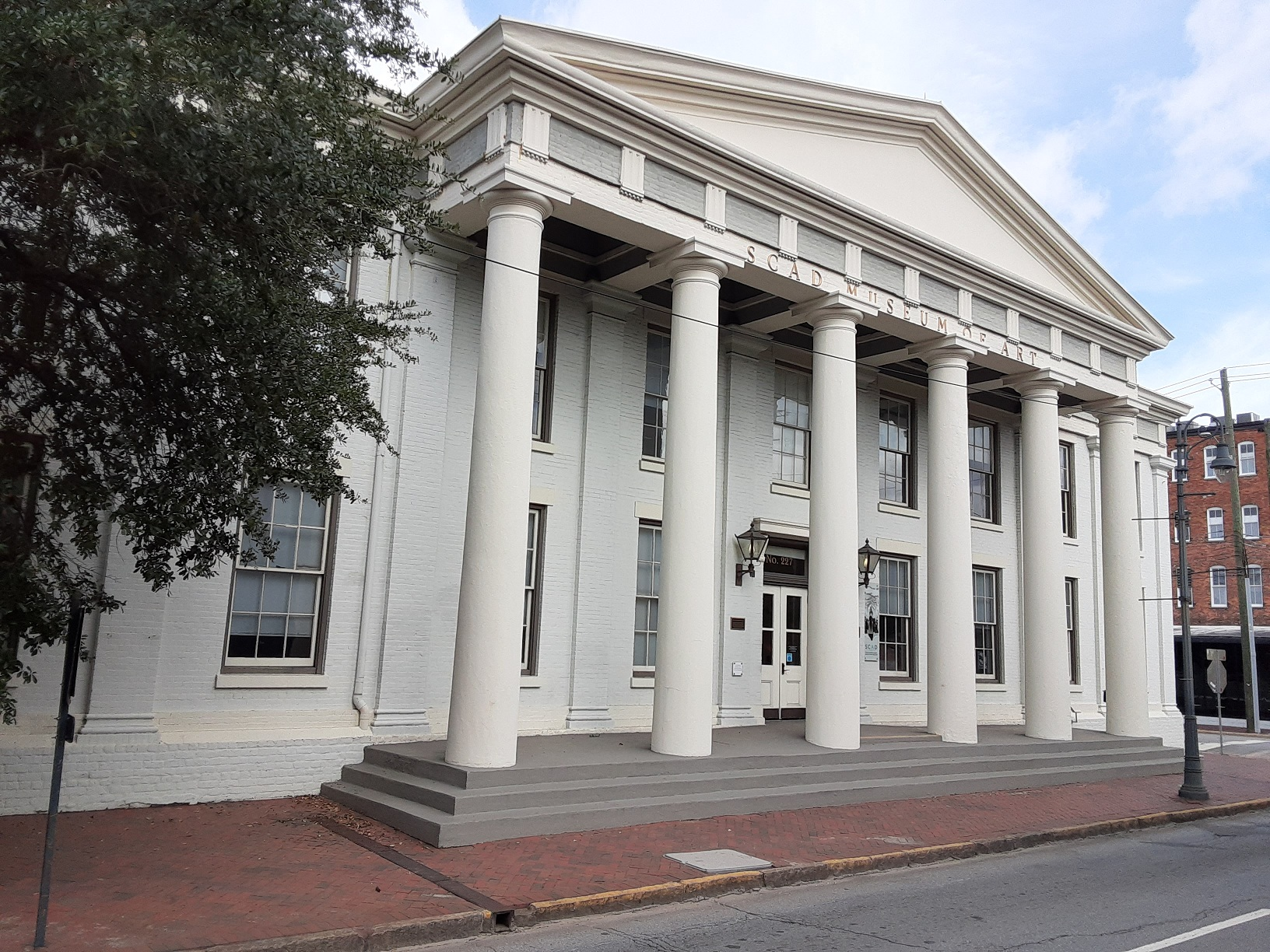
Kiah Hall, 227 Martin Luther King Jr. Boulevard, completed in 1856

Below is a selection of notable buildings and structures on Martin Luther King Jr. Boulevard, all in Savannah's Historic District. From north to south:

- William Scarbrough House, 41 Martin Luther King Jr. Boulevard (1819)
- Crites Hall, 217 Martin Luther King Jr. Boulevard (1906; now part of the Savannah College of Art and Design (SCAD))
- Kiah Hall, 227 Martin Luther King Jr. Boulevard (1856; now part of SCAD)
- Central of Georgia Railway "Up Freight" sheds remnants, 227 Martin Luther King Jr. Boulevard (1853)
- Central of Georgia Railway "Red Building" 233 Martin Luther King Jr. Boulevard (1888)
- Central of Georgia Railway "Down Freight" sheds, 233 Martin Luther King Jr. Boulevard (1859)
- Central of Georgia Railway Train Terminal, 301 Martin Luther King Jr. Boulevard (1860 to 1876)
- St. Matthew's Church, 1401 Martin Luther King Jr. Boulevard (1948)
- Adoniram Thorpe House, 2205–2207 Martin Luther King Jr. Boulevard (1901)
