= Savannah Tribune =

African-American newspaper in Savannah, Georgia, U.S.

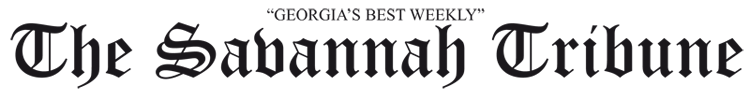
- Type: Weekly newspaper
- Owner: Shirley B. James
- Publisher: Shirley B. James
- Editor: Shirley B. James
- Managing editor: Dedra Holloway
- Founded: 1875 (151 years ago)
- Headquarters: Savannah, Georgia; United States
- Circulation: 10,000
- Website: www.savannahtribune.com

The Savannah Tribune is a weekly African-American newspaper published in Savannah, Georgia.

== History ==
The Savannah Tribune was founded in 1875 and went through two hiatuses (from 1878 to 1886 and from 1960 to 1973). Originally named the Colored Tribune, the paper was established by Louis B. Toomer Sr., Louis M. Pleasant, and Savannah native John H. Deveaux, who served as the first editor. The first edition was published in 1875. The name was changed to the Savannah Tribune in 1876.

The newspaper published until 1878, when the all-white printers in the city, refused to produce it. It reopened in 1886. Deveaux served as the paper's owner and editor until 1894. Sol C. Johnson was appointed as the paper's editor and purchased the paper in 1909 upon Deveaux's death. Johnson ran the paper until his death in 1954, when he was succeeded by his goddaughter Willa Johnson. She edited the paper until it closed in 1960.

Robert E. James, a Savannah banker, reestablished the paper in 1973 and served as the owner and publisher until 1983. In that year, Shirley B. James became the publisher and owner.

Managing Editors have included Tanya Milton, current Vice President and Advertising Director, Deanie Frazier, Sharon Smiley, Marius Davis Whitney Hunter and Dedra Holloway.

== See also ==
- African American newspapers
