= Jung Yeondoo =

South Korean visual artist (born 1969)

Jung Yeondoo (Korean: 정연두; born 1969) is a South Korean visual artist who works primarily with photography, videography, and sculpture. He has a studio located in Seoul. He was the youngest recipient of the "Artist of the Year" award by the National Museum of Contemporary Art, Korea in 2007. He has been selected as the artist featured in the MMCA Hyundai Motor Series 2023. He has shown work in numerous museums and biennials worldwide like the 51st Venice Biennial and the Liverpool Biennial in 2008. His work is featured in public and private art collections throughout the world such as the Fondazione Cassa di Risparmio di Modena, the Rhode Island School of Design Museum and the Museum of Modern Art in New York.

He was born in Jinju.

== Education ==
Jung majored in sculpture at Seoul National University. Afterwards, he studied under David Annesley at Central Saint Martins College of Art. He obtained his Master of Fine Art at Goldsmiths College, University of London in 1997 where he discovered photography by coming into contact with other photographers while pursuing his degree. Jung became interested in making work that challenges cultural stereotypes.

== Work ==
Jung is known for photographs, videos and installations that obscure borders of reality and representation by revealing to the viewer the mechanisms used to create his work. They draw from personal and cultural memory, dream spaces, and global popular visual culture.

His Evergreen Tower (2001) series is a collection of thirty two family portraits taken in an apartment block in Gwangjang-dong, Seoul. The architectural structure of the rooms are the same and the only change is the decoration and the family. During the time of the creation on this work, freestanding houses in Korea were being replaced by apartment buildings.

His Bewitched (2001), named after the 1960s TV show, series turns young people's dreams into staged photographs. He traveled to six different countries and asked locals about their wishes for their futures. He had them pose in two contrasting portraits in identical postures, one in the present and one in their future self representing their dreams.

His Wonderland (2004) series turns children's paintings into photographs. He chose 17 out of 1,200 paintings he collected in Seoul and recruited 60 high school students to pose in the work.

Jung's Location (2006) series is a collection of photographs that contrast real landscapes with man made sets. They are titled numerically by the order of creation within the series.

His mixed media interactive sculpture, Time Capsule (2008), was chosen by the Korean Artist Project as a way to promote Korean contemporary artists to a global audience. His photograph, Adolescence (2011), was also selected.

His first solo exhibition in Australia contained two single-channel videos titled Documentary Nostalgia (2007) and Twilight Seoul (2012). Documentary Nostalgia (2007) is an 84-minute silent video consisting of stagehands pulling apart and creating a series of scenes for a stable camera. It begins in a scene depicting his memory of his father's home as workers enter the scene to add, change, and remove elements of the scene like a chandelier or a rug. It is a long sequence of composition shifts from interior settings to exterior settings like fields, hills, mountains, and a sunset. This video was also shown at NY MoMA and was inspired by an attempt to relocate a view of the Taebaek Mountains, a mountain range that stretches across North and South Korea. His second piece, Twilight Seoul (8:40), is a collaboration with fellow artist, Luka Fineisin. They create a panorama of Seoul using remains from Jung's studio as material, like cardboard boxes and broken electronics along with lights and a smoke machine as they discuss the choices on camera.

His first theatre performance is titled Cinemagician and it was performed at the Asia Society in New York in 2009.

His exhibition Just Like the Road across the Earth at Japan's Art Tower Mito in 2014 includes Blind Perspective (2014), Boramae Dance Hall (2001), and Six Points, Ordinary Paradise (2010). The photographs, videos, and installation center around the landscape lost in the 2011 Tōhoku earthquake and tsunami. Blind Perspective (2014) is a sculptural landscape made with the ruined infrastructure and waste found in Japan after the tsunami that is then transformed once the viewer puts on the virtual reality headset. The remains turn into natural elements like flowers and mountains that made up the landscape before the destruction from the tsunami.

== Selected solo exhibitions ==
- 2001 "Boramae Dance Hall", Gallery Loop, Seoul, Korea
- 2002 "Tokyo Brand City", Koyanagi Gallery, Tokyo, Japan
- 2002 "Chinese Lucky Estate", 1A Space, Hong Kong
- 2003 "Bewitched", Gallery Loop, Seoul, Korea
- 2004 "Beat It", Insa Art Center, Seoul, Korea
- 2005 "Wonderland", Tina Kim Fine Art, New York
- 2006 "Are You Lonesome Tonight?", Kukje Gallery, Seoul, Korea
- 2007 "Wonderland", Galeria Espacio Minimo, Madrid, Spain
- 2007 "I Will Remember You", ACA Gallery, Atlanta / Red Gallery, Savannah College of Art and Design, Savannah, GA
- 2007 "Memories of You – Artist of the Year 2007", National Museum of Contemporary Art Gwacheon, Korea
- 2007 "Locations", Tina Kim Gallery, New York
- 2008 "For your loneliness", gallery Gebr. Lehmann, Dresden/Berlin

== Public collections ==
- Art Sonje Center, Seoul, Korea
- The Calder Foundation, New York
- Estee Lauder Corporation, New York
- Fondazione Cassa di Risparmio di Modena, Italy
- Fukuoka Asian Art Museum, Fukuoka, Japan
- Gyeonggido Museum of Art, Ansan, Korea
- Joddes Collection, Pharmascience, Montreal, Canada
- Joy of Giving Something Foundation, New York
- Museum of Modern Art, New York
- National Museum of Contemporary Art, Seoul, Korea
- New Line Cinema, New York
- RISD Museum, Providence, Rhode Island
- Savannah College of Art and Design, Savannah, Georgia
- Seoul Museum of Art, Seoul, Korea
- Ssamzie Space, Seoul, Korea
