= Savannah station (Central of Georgia Railway) =

Savannah History Museum
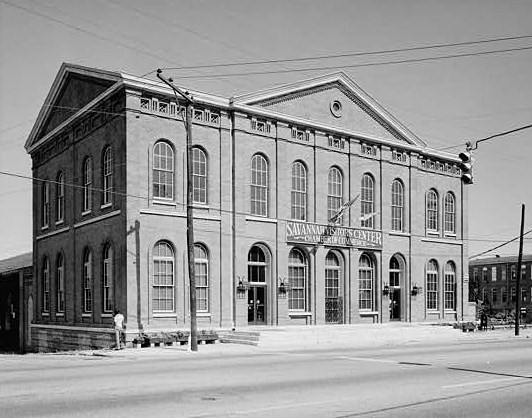
- Pictured in 1976
- Location: 303 Martin Luther King, Jr. Boulevard; Savannah, Georgia; United States
- Type: History
- Website: http://www.chsgeorgia.org/history-museum.html
- Central of Georgia Depot and Trainshed
- U.S. National Register of Historic Places
- U.S. National Historic Landmark
- U.S. National Historic Landmark District – Contributing property
- Location within Georgia Location within the United States
- Location: W. Louisville and E. Liberty Sts., Savannah, Georgia
- Coordinates: 32.07607°N 81.09923°W
- Built: 1860; 166 years ago
- Architect: Augustus Schwaab
- Part of: Central of Georgia Railroad: Savannah Shops and Terminal Facilities (ID78000970)
- NRHP reference No.: 76000610

Significant dates
- Added to NRHP: December 8, 1976; 49 years ago
- Designated NHL: December 8, 1976; 49 years ago
- Designated NHLDCP: June 2, 1978; 48 years ago

Savannah station is a former passenger depot and trainshed constructed in 1860 by the Central of Georgia Railway (CofG) before the outbreak of the American Civil War. This pair of buildings was declared a National Historic Landmark in 1976, a listing that was expanded in 1978 to the old Central of Georgia Railway Savannah Shops and Terminal Facilities.

Located on the northwest corner of Martin Luther King Jr. Boulevard and Louisville Road in the city's historic downtown, the red brick passenger terminal of the CofG complex houses the Savannah Visitor Center and the Savannah History Museum. The site complex includes several notable structures, including cotton yard, a blacksmith shop, a brick viaduct and the trainshed, as well as an office car and caboose. It is owned by the Coastal Heritage Society, a non-profit organization dedicated to preserving the cultural heritage of coastal Georgia and adjacent regions.

The Savannah History Museum is located at 303 Martin Luther King Jr. Boulevard (Georgia State Route 25 Connector). The museum is housed inside the old passenger terminal. It contains artifacts and exhibits relating to the history of Savannah from its establishment to the current time. The shops and terminal facilities were listed separately on June 2, 1978, and the Coastal Heritage Society opened the museum on the site in 1989.

== Passenger trains in the station ==
The Central of Georgia operated several trains to the station, on an Atlanta (Terminal Station)–Macon (Terminal Station)–Savannah itinerary. The last of these was the Nancy Hanks II, operating until 1971, when Amtrak assumed most passenger train operations in the United States.

Preceding station	Central of Georgia Railway	Following station
West Savannah toward Atlanta	Main Line	Terminus
