= Sir Patrick Houstoun, 5th Baronet of Houstoun =

British colonial administrator (1697–1762)

Patrick Houstoun

Personal details
- Born: 24 June 1697 Glasgow, Scotland
- Died: 5 February 1762 (aged 64) Savannah, Province of Georgia
- Resting place: Bonaventure Cemetery, Savannah, Province of Georgia
- Spouse: Priscilla Dunbar (died 1773)
- Children: 3
- Profession: Colonial land-grant registrar

Sir Patrick Houstoun, 5th Baronet of Houstoun (24 June 1697 – 5 February 1762) was a Scottish nobleman who became the registrar of land grants for the Georgia Colony and the collector of quit-rents (a permanent annual tax on each grant). He was elected to the first Provincial Assembly and served on the Royal Council under three Royal Governors of Georgia.

== Early life ==
Houstoun was born in 1697 in Glasgow, Scotland, the second son of Sir John Houstoun, 2nd Baronet, and Lady Anne, daughter of John Drummond, 1st Earl of Melfort, and Sophia, daughter of Robert Maitland. She was the heiress of Lundin. Their son, Patrick's brother and their father's successor, was Sir John Houston, 3rd Baronet, M.P. Houstoun's grandfather was Sir Patrick Houstoun, 1st Baronet.

Aged 15, Houstoun studied humanity and literature at the University of Glasgow.

== Career ==
Around 1733, Houston and his brother, James, set sail for colonial America along with Dr Patrick Tailfer, an Edinburgh physician; Andrew Grant and John Bailie, merchants from Edinburgh; Thomas Bailey of Orkney; brothers Alexander and Robert Bailie; and Hugh Stirling, amongst others. They initially settled beside the Ogeechee River, about 17 miles (27 km) south of Savannah, Province of Georgia. Having quickly grown despondent of their living conditions, Houstoun, Grant, Stirling and Tailfer wrote a letter to the Trustees for the Establishment of the Colony of Georgia in America.

== Personal life ==
In 1741, Houstoun married Priscilla Dunbar, daughter of James and Janet, of Inverness, Scotland, whom it is believed he met at Frederica on St Simons, the Georgia home of her brother, Captain George Dunbar. They had three known children together: John, George and William. John was one of the original Sons of Liberty and also a delegate for Georgia in the Second Continental Congress in 1775. He was the governor of Georgia from 1778 to 1779 and 1784 to 1785. William was aFounding Father of the United States, a statesman and a lawyer. He served the Province of Georgia as a delegate to the Continental Congress and later the State of Georgia to the United States Constitutional Convention in 1787.

He joined Solomon's Lodge in Savannah in 1734. Two years later, he established a plantation, named Rose Dhu (or Rosdue), on a neck of land between Vernon River and Little Ogeechee River.

== Death ==
Houstoun died in 1762 in Savannah. He was interred in the city's Bonaventure Cemetery. His widow survived him by eleven years and was buried beside him.
