= Clan Houston =

Scottish clan

- Crest: A sand-glass Proper
- Motto: In Time

Profile
- Region: Lowlands
- District: Lanarkshire
- Founder: Hugh de Padinan
- Clan Houston no longer has a chief, and is an armigerous clan
- The Baronet of Houston
- Historic seat: Houston House
- Last Chief: Sir Patrick Houston of Houston, 8th Baronet
- Died: c. 1835

Clan Houston is a Scottish clan. The clan does not have a chief; therefore, it is considered an armigerous clan.

== History ==
=== Origins of the clan ===
The name is territorial in origin, derived from an old barony of the name in Lanarkshire. Hugh de Padinan, who is believed to have lived in the 12th century (1100s), was granted the lands of Kilpeter. By about the middle of the 14th century, these lands had become known as Huston, or Houston, Renfrewshire. Sir Finlay de Hustone appears on the Ragman Roll swearing fealty to King Edward I of England in 1296.

The castle of the de Hustones was built on the site of an ancient Cistercian abbey. The family also acquired a substantial barony near Whitburn, West Lothian, where Huston House, which was rebuilt in the eighteenth century, still stands today. Sir Patrick Hustone of that Ilk, who was probably the eleventh chief, married Agnes Campbell of Ardkinglas.

=== 16th and 17th centuries (1500s–1600s) ===
During the Anglo-Scottish Wars, Sir Peter Huston fought with the Earl of Lennox on the right wing at Battle of Flodden in 1513, where he was killed.

His son, Sir Patrick Huston of Huston, was a companion of King James V of Scotland, and Keeper of the Quarter Seal. After the death of King James IV of Scotland in the Battle of Flodden in 1513, Huston intrigued with the Earl of Lennox against the king, and was slain at the Battle of Linlithgow Bridge on 4 September 1526.

The next Sir Patrick Huston, his grandson, was knighted by Mary, Queen of Scots, and accompanied her when she visited her husband Henry Stewart, Lord Darnley in Glasgow.

The nineteenth chief was created a Baronet of Nova Scotia ("New Scotland") by King Charles II of England and Scotland in 1668. His son, Sir John Huston, was falconer to Queen Mary II of England and Scotland and her husband and co-ruler, King King William III of England and Scotland.

=== 18th and 19th centuries (1700s–1800s) ===
The fifth Baronet was a prosperous merchant who had substantial interests in United States. His son, who was educated in Glasgow, Scotland, made his home in the southern state of Georgia in the United States, and he and his brother greatly increased the family's colonial estates. They are reputed to have owned over 8,000 slaves when the thirteen American colonies broke from Great Britain in the American War of Independence. The Hustons renounced their Scottish titles in favour of their American wealth.

General Sam Houston, born in Rockbridge, Virginia in 1793, was a schoolteacher in Maryville, Tennessee; a U.S. Senator from the State of Tennessee; ran for President of the United States; fought for the independence of Texas from Mexico, defeating General Antonio López de Santa Anna; and expanded the Texas Rangers. He was the first president of the Republic of Texas, and later served as Governor of the State of Texas. Houston, Texas, the fourth-most populated city in the United States, is named for him.

Sir Robert Houston, descended from a Renfrew branch of the family, was a prominent Victorian ship owner who was created a baronet of the United Kingdom. He is credited with developing the theory of convoys first used during the Boer War.

== Arms ==
Coat of arms of Clan Houston
Coronet The coronet of a baronet (Houston baronets of Houston) (Note: This coat of arms was listed by Henry Beckwith in A Roll of Arms...Heraldry of the New England Historic Geneaological Society (p. 95) as belonging to Sir Patrick Houston, 5th Baronet (c. 1698–1762). It was confirmed by the Court of the Lord Lyon to have been later registered to his descendant, George Ludovic Houstoun of Johnstone, granted 20 October 1869.) Crest A sand-glass (hourglass) proper Escutcheon Or, a chevron chequy Azure and Argent, between three martlets Sable, beaked Gules Supporters Two hinds proper (Note: According to the Court of the Lord Lyon, earlier supporters of "two Greyhounds proper Collared and chained Or" were granted on 23 December 1799 to Sir William Houston, 1st Baronet (later Houston-Boswall) of Calderhall. However, it is unclear whether the Houstoun-Boswall baronets are related to the Houstons of Johnstone, near Houston, Renfrewshire.) Motto In Time

== See also ==
- Houston, Renfrewshire
- Scottish Clan
