= Solomon's Lodge, Savannah =

Masonic lodge in Savannah, Georgia, United States

Solomon's Lodge
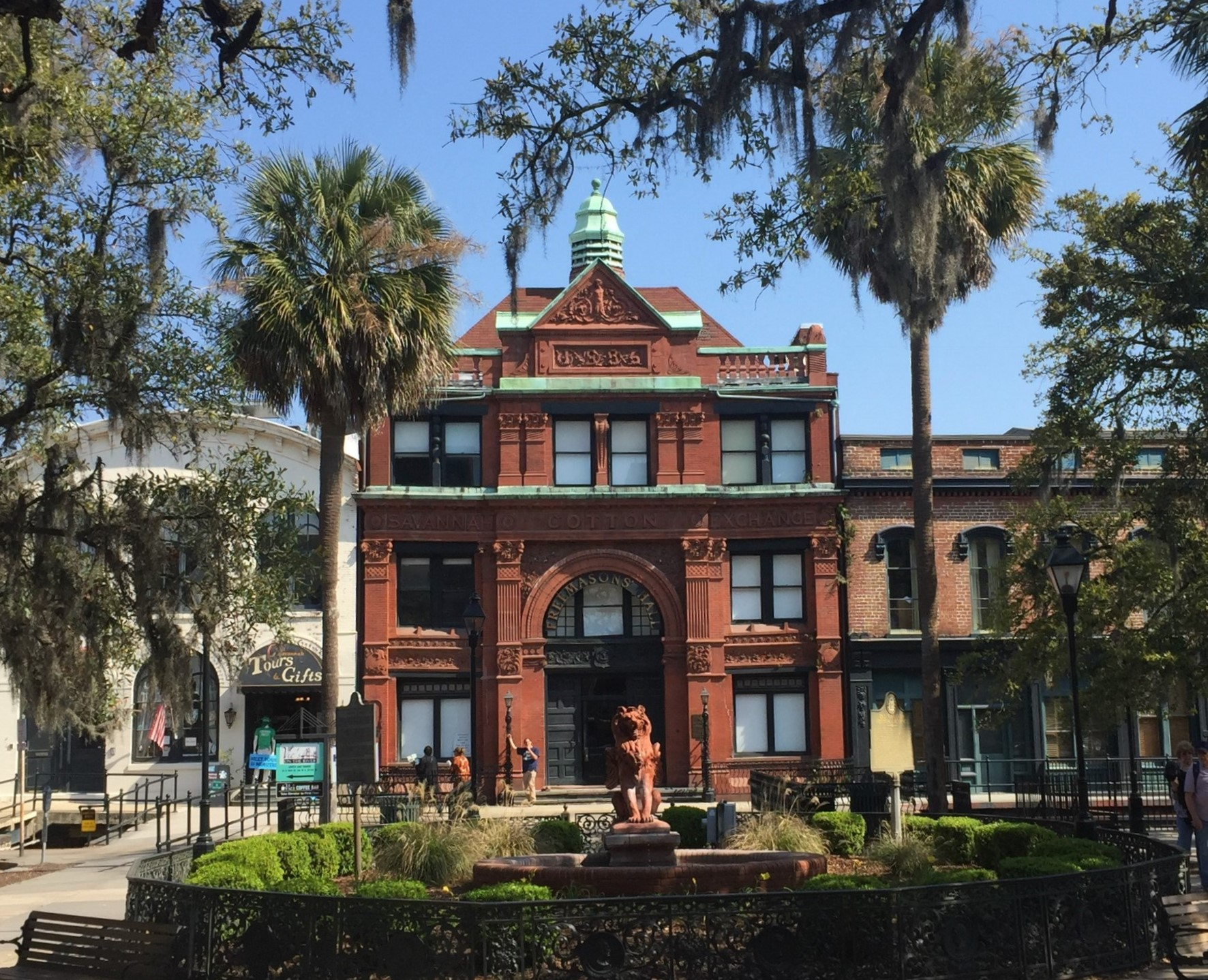
- Main façade of Freemasons' Hall in Savannah
- Named after: Solomon
- Established: February 21, 1734 (292 years ago)
- Founders: James Lacey; James Oglethorpe
- Type: Masonic lodge
- Location: 100 East Bay Street, Savannah, Georgia
- Coordinates: 32.0811610°N 81.089883°W
- Region served: Chatham County, Georgia
- Parent organization: Grand Lodge of Georgia, Free and Accepted Masons
- Website: solomonslodge1.com

Solomon's Lodge, officially Solomon's Lodge, No. 1, Free and Accepted Masons (F. & A. M.), located in Freemasons' Hall, Savannah, Georgia, is a Masonic lodge established in 1734 by James Lacey and General James Oglethorpe. It is believed to be the oldest, continuously operating, English-constituted lodge in the Western Hemisphere, a title also claimed by St. John's Lodge, Portsmouth, established in 1734 or 1736.

== History ==
Solomon's Lodge is the mother lodge of the Grand Lodge of Georgia, Free and Accepted Masons, and between 1734 and 1785 was the only lodge in Georgia. It was not called Solomon's Lodge until 1776, previously being known as "The Lodge at Savannah." It occupies the former Savannah Cotton Exchange building. The first person to be initiated into the lodge was the settler and plantation founder Noble Jones.

== Notable members ==
Many members of Solomon's Lodge have held prestigious positions throughout history in the armed forces, government, and public service. Several prominent members of the Lodge are listed below.

Name	Notability	References
Archibald Bulloch	1st Governor of Georgia (1776–1777), delegate from Georgia to the Continental Congress (1775)	
William Bellinger Bulloch	U.S. Senator from Georgia (1813–1813), 12th Mayor of Savannah, Georgia (1809–1811, 1811–1812), president of the State Bank of Georgia (1816–1843)	
Samuel Elbert	18th Governor of Georgia (1785–1786), brigadier general in the Continental Army	
Thomas Gibbons	2nd Mayor of Savannah, Georgia (1791–1792, 1794–1795, 1799–1801), plaintiff in Gibbons v. Ogden (1824)	
James Gunn	U.S. Senator from Georgia (1789–1801), brigadier general in the Georgia Militia	
James Habersham	Acting governor of the Province of Georgia (1769–1772), credited with opening the first direct trade between Savannah, Georgia and London	
John Habersham	Delegate to the Congress of the Confederation (1785)	
Joseph Habersham	3rd United States Postmaster General (1795–1801), 3rd Mayor of Savannah, Georgia (1792–1793)	
Lyman Hall	17th Governor of Georgia (1783–1784), delegate from Georgia to the Continental Congress (1775–1777)	
George Handley	21st Governor of Georgia (1788–1789)	
John Houstoun	10th Governor of Georgia (1778–1779, 1784–1785), 1st Mayor of Savannah, Georgia (1790–1791), delegate for Georgia in the Second Continental Congress (1775)	
William Houstoun	Delegate representing Georgia at the Constitutional Convention (1787)	
James Jackson	23rd Governor of Georgia (1798–1801), U.S. Senator from Georgia (1793–1795, 1801–1806), member of the U.S. House of Representatives (1789–1791)	
George Jones	U.S. Senator from Georgia (1807–1807), 14th Mayor of Savannah, Georgia (1812–1814)	
Noble Jones	One of the first settlers of the Province of Georgia	
Noble Wimberly Jones	Delegate to the Continental Congress in 1781 and 1782	
John Martin	16th Governor of Georgia (1782–1783)	
Matthew McAllister	1st U.S. Attorney for the Southern District of Georgia (1789–1797), 7th Mayor of Savannah, Georgia (1798–1799)	
Henry Osborne	Georgia Chief Justice (1787–1789), member of the Georgia General Assembly (1786–1788)	
Nathaniel Pendleton	U.S. District Court Judge for the District of Georgia (1789–1796), Attorney General of Georgia (1785–1786)	
William Pierce	Delegate representing Georgia at the Constitutional Convention (1787)	
William Stephens	U.S. District Court Judge for the District of Georgia (1801–1818), 4th Mayor of Savannah, Georgia (1793–1794, 1795–1796)	
Samuel Stirk	Attorney General of Georgia (1782)	
Josiah Tattnall	25th Governor of Georgia (1801–1802), U.S. Senator from Georgia (1796–1799), member of the Georgia House of Representatives (1795–1796)	
John A. Treutlen	9th Governor of Georgia (1777–1778)	
George Walton	U.S. Senator from Georgia (1795–1796), Acting Governor of Georgia (1789–1790), delegate representing Georgia at the Constitutional Convention (1787)	

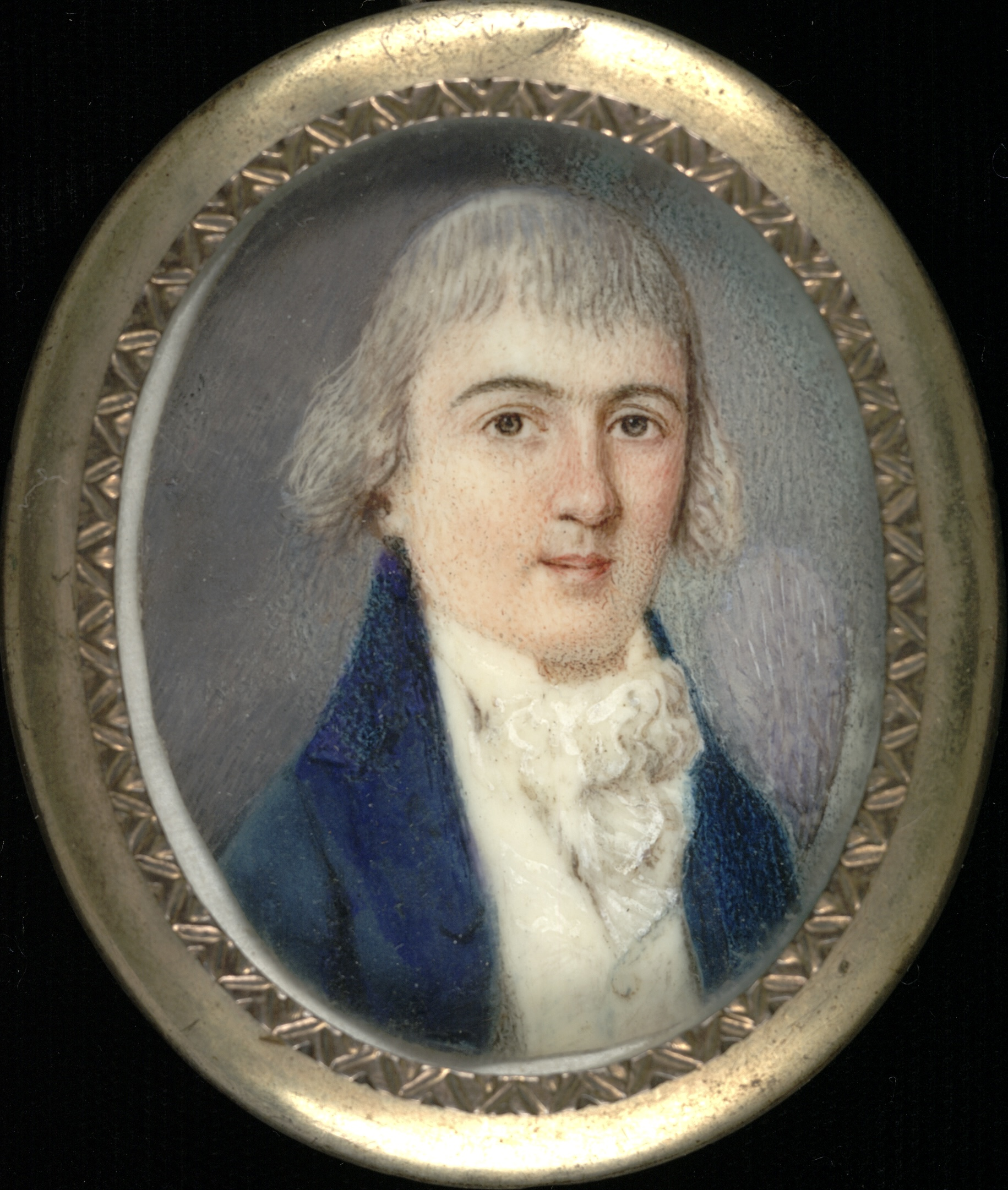
Archibald Bulloch

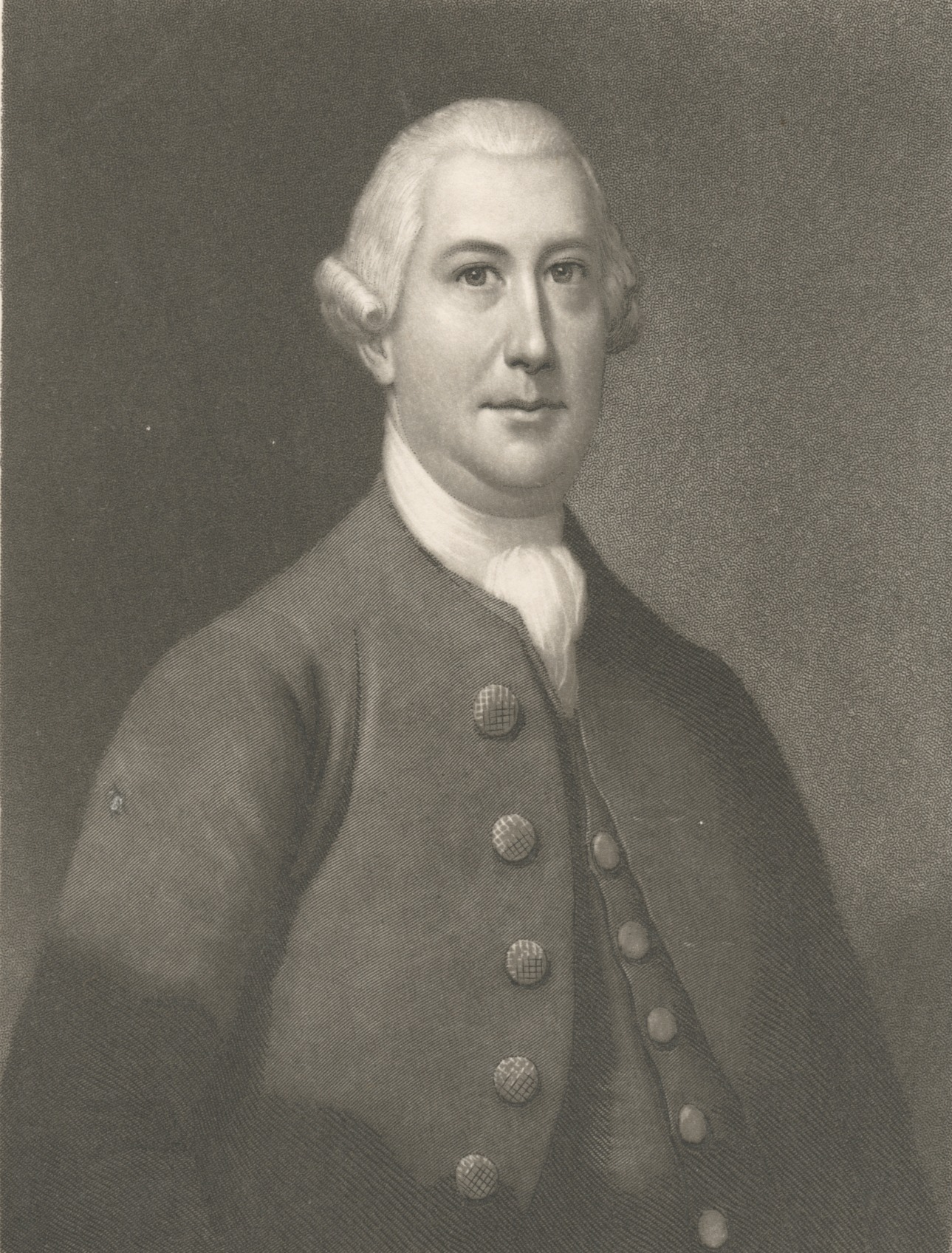
James Habersham

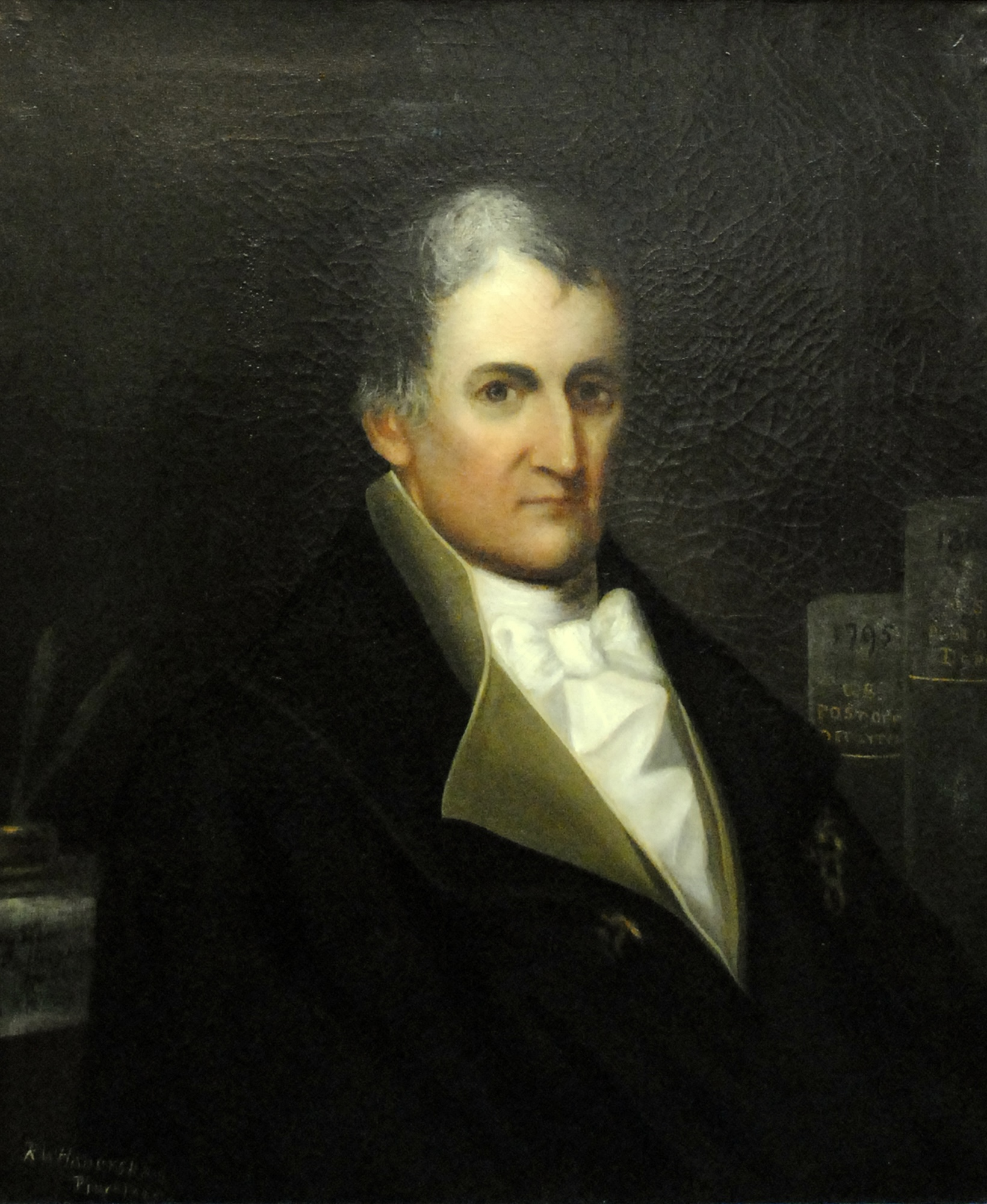
Joseph Habersham

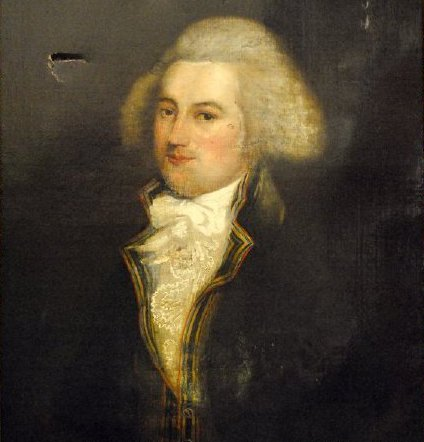
William Houstoun

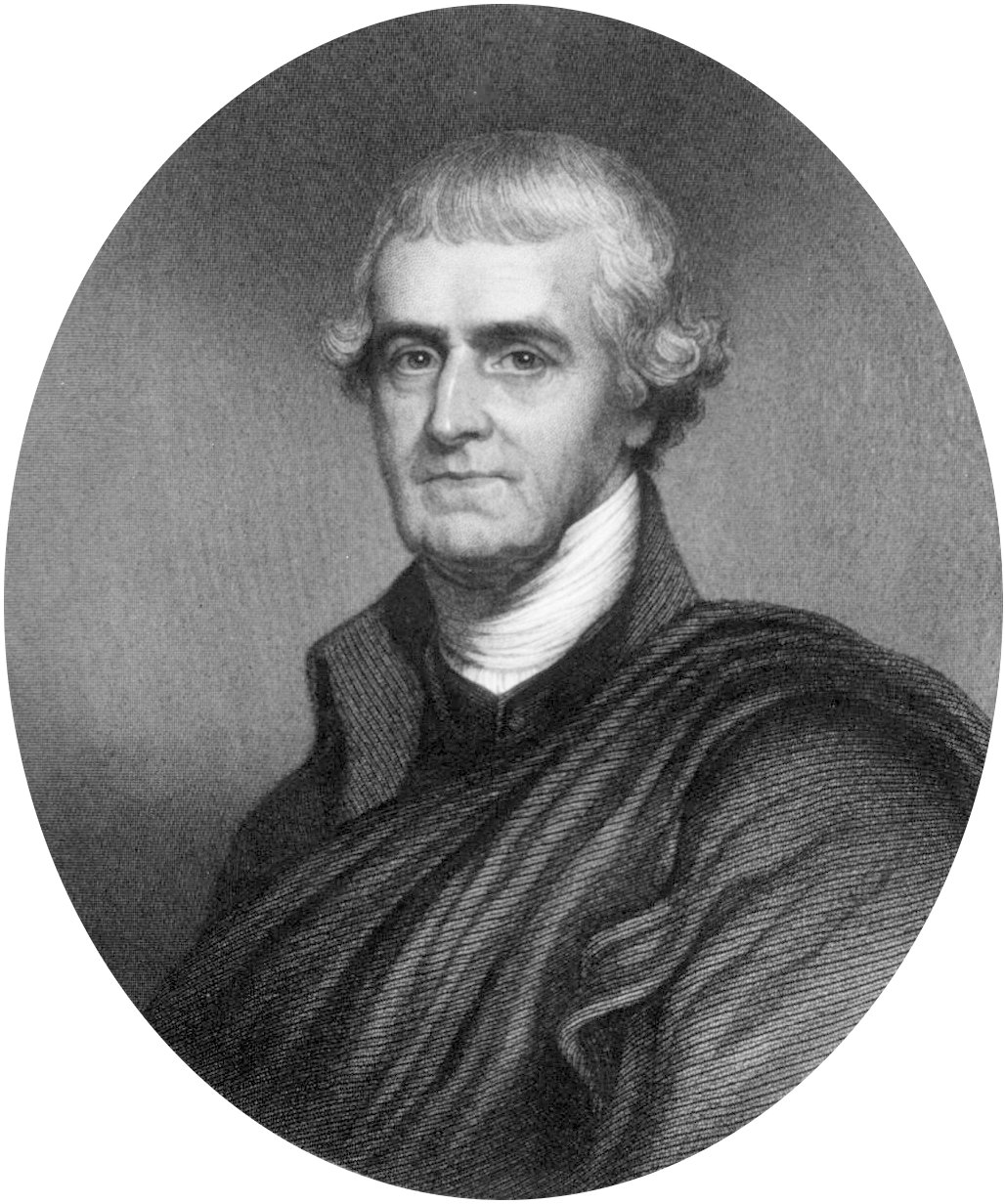
Noble Wimberly Jones
