= Savannah Cotton Exchange =

Freemasons' Hall
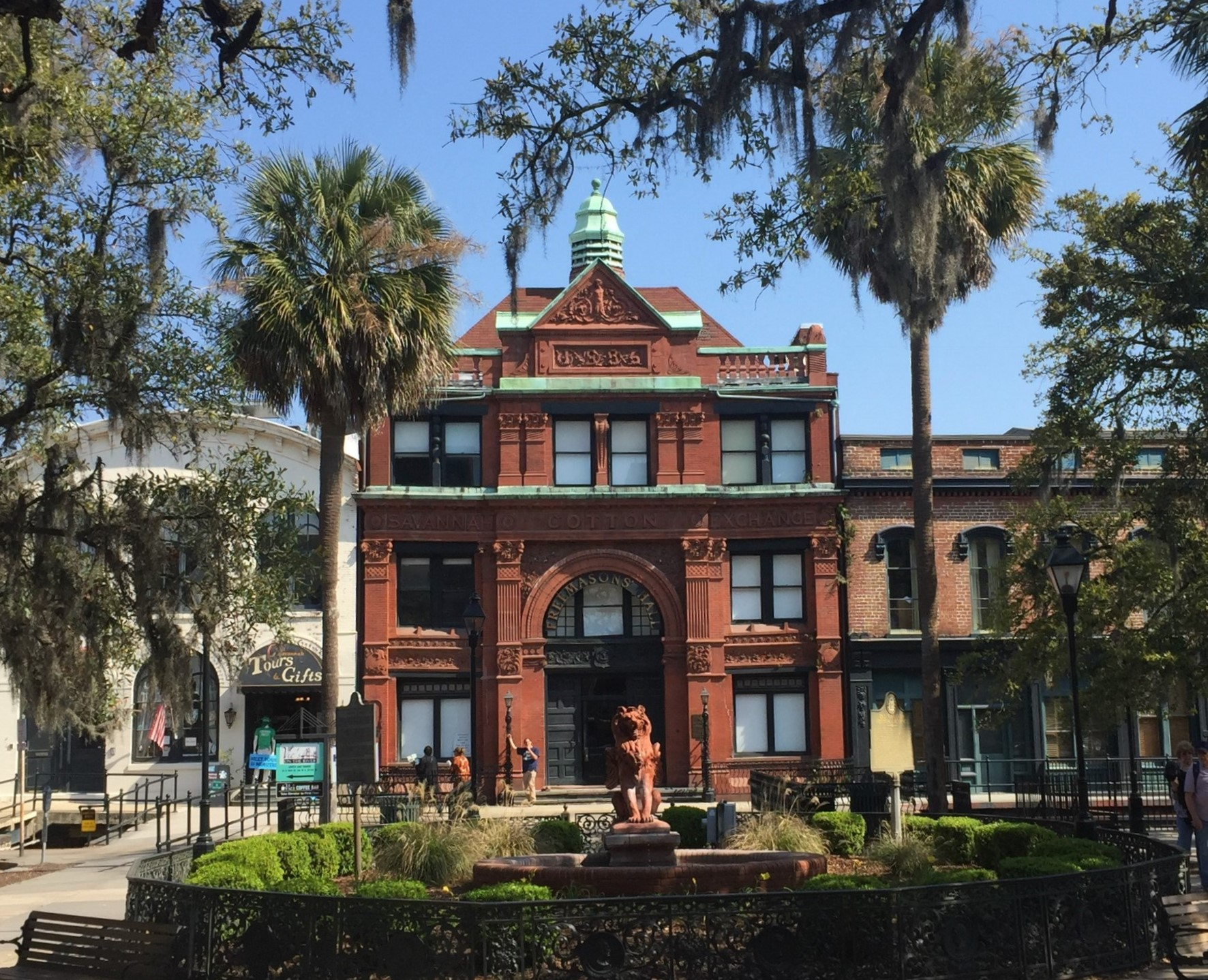
- Freemasons' Hall in Savannah, Georgia
- Former names: Savannah Cotton Exchange

General information
- Architectural style: Queen Anne
- Location: Savannah, Georgia, U.S., 100 East Bay Street
- Coordinates: 32.0811610°N 81.089883°W
- Current tenants: Solomon's Lodge, No. 1, Free and Accepted Masons
- Completed: 1887 (139 years ago)

Technical details
- Floor count: 3

Design and construction
- Architect: William G. Preston

Freemasons' Hall, formerly the Savannah Cotton Exchange, was built in 1876 in Savannah, Georgia, United States. Its function was to provide King Cotton factors, brokers serving planters' interest in the market, a place to congregate and set the market value of cotton exported to larger markets such as New York City or London. By the end of the 19th century, factorage was on the decline as more planters were selling their products at interior markets, thus merely shipping them from Savannah via the extensive rail connections between the city and the interior. The cotton exchange went out of business in 1951.

== History ==
General William Washington Gordon II was a chairman of the exchange after serving in the Battle of Jonesboro (1864).

In the June 10, 1878, edition of the New York Times, the exchange published the following report, sent the previous day, as a summary for May's business:

One hundred and forty-seven replies were received from 61 counties. The area of land planted in cotton this season was slightly an increase over last year, say 2 per cent. The weather has been unusually find and favorable for the plant. The stands are generally very good, and the crop 10 days to two weeks ahead of last year. The labor is about the same as last year, both as to numbers and efficiency. Where fertilizers are generally used the increase has been 10 to 15 per cent over last season. The present condition of the crop is good. The Spring was early and the preparation of land for planting better than usual. The fields are clear of grass, and the plant is growing rapidly.

== 100 East Bay Street ==
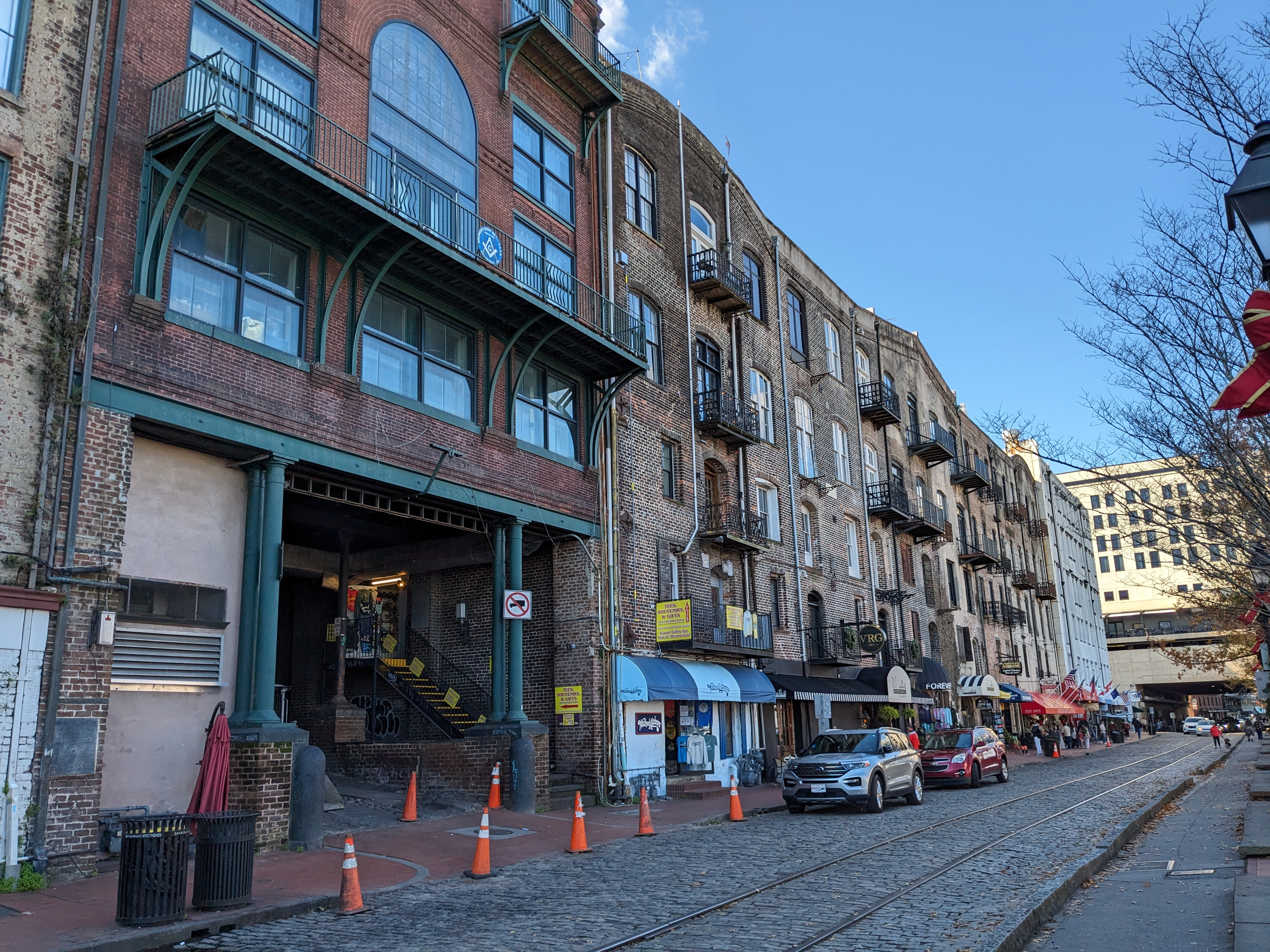
The rear of the building (left), on River Street

The exchange moved to 100 East Bay Street location, in 1887, where the building still stands, with the former warehouses down below on River Street now replaced by a tunnel through to Factors Walk. The city allowed the exchange to build on top of Drayton Street ramp, as long as they left the ramp accessible below, hence its unique design. As the Savannah Morning News reported it, the day after its official opening: "The building is built in the center of a slip leading to the river, and is raised thirty-five feet or so from the ground by iron pillars, so as to give free access to River street."

The building's architect was William G. Preston, whose design was favored over eleven other architects. It is located in Savannah's Historic District, which is listed on the National Register of Historic Places, and the Cotton Exchange building is a contributing property.

The building has been home to Solomon's Lodge, No. 1, Free and Accepted Masons, since 1976. It was established by founder of the Province of Georgia, General James Oglethorpe, in 1734.

On Labor Day in 2006, a car smashed into the building, causing substantial damage.

The Savannah Chamber of Commerce has erroneously been mentioned as currently occupying the building, but they are former tenants, having been there in the first part of the 20th century; they are now based across the street at 101 East Bay Street.
