= Houston baronets =

Extinct baronetcy in the Baronetage of the United Kingdom

There have been two baronetcies created for persons with the surname Houston, one in the Baronetage of Nova Scotia and one in the Baronetage of the United Kingdom, the first dormant or extinct, the second extinct.

The Houston Baronetcy, of Houston in the County of Renfrew, was created in the Baronetage of Nova Scotia on 29 February 1668 for Patrick Houston. The third Baronet represented Linlithgowshire in Parliament. After the death of the eighth Baronet in circa 1835, no-one successfully claimed the title, although there were living heirs.

The Houston Baronetcy, of West Toxteth in the City of Liverpool, was created in the Baronetage of the United Kingdom on 17 January 1922 for the shipowner and Conservative politician Robert Houston. The title became extinct on his death in 1926. His wife Lucy, Lady Houston, was a benefactor and philanthropist.

Arms of the Houston baronets, of Houston

== Houston baronets, of Houston (1668) ==
- Sir Patrick Houston, 1st Baronet (died 1696)
- Sir John Houston, 2nd Baronet (died 1717)
- Sir John Houston, 3rd Baronet (died 1722)
- Sir John Houston, 4th Baronet (died 1751)
- Sir Patrick Houstoun, 5th Baronet of Houstoun (1697–1762)
- Sir Patrick Houston, 6th Baronet (c. 1743–1785)
- Sir George Houston, 7th Baronet (c. 1745–1795)
- Sir Patrick Houston, 8th Baronet (died c. 1835)

== Houston baronets, of West Toxteth (1922) ==
- Sir Robert Paterson Houston, 1st Baronet (1853–1926)

== Arms ==
Coat of arms of Houston baronets
| Coronet The coronet of a baronet (Houston baronets of Houston) (Note: This coat of arms was listed by Henry Beckwith in A Roll of Arms...Heraldry of the New England Historic Genealogical Society (p. 95) as belonging to Sir Patrick Houston, 5th Baronet (c. 1698–1762). It was confirmed by the Court of the Lord Lyon to have been later registered to his descendant, George Ludovic Houstoun of Johnstone, granted 20 October 1869.) Crest A sand-glass (hourglass) proper Escutcheon Or, a chevron chequy Azure and Argent, between three martlets Sable, beaked Gules Supporters Two hinds proper (Note: According to the Court of the Lord Lyon, earlier supporters of "two Greyhounds proper Collared and chained Or" were granted on 23 December 1799 to Sir William Houston, 1st Baronet (later Houston-Boswall) of Calderhall. However, it is unclear whether the Houstoun-Boswall baronets are related to the Houstons of Johnstone, near Houston, Renfrewshire.) Motto In Time |
