= Kennedy baronets of Johnstown Kennedy (1836) =

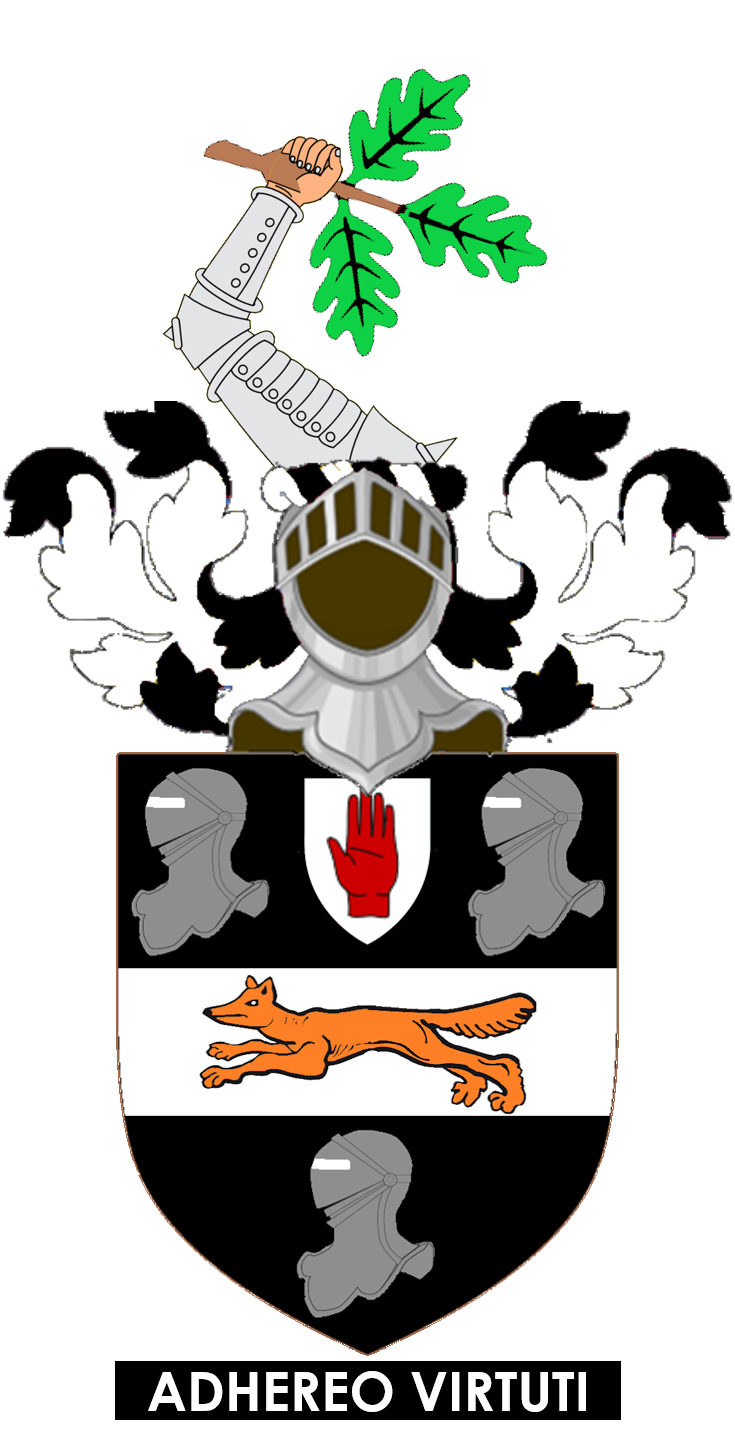
Arms of Baronets of Johnston Kennedy: Sable on a Fess Argent between three Esquire's Helmets close a Fox courant proper; Crest: A Dexter Arm embowed in armour proper holding a Branch of Oak also proper; Motto: Adhereo virtuti (I adhere to virtue)

The Kennedy baronetcy, of Johnstown Kennedy in the County of Dublin, was created in the Baronetage of the United Kingdom on 18 July 1836 for John Kennedy.

The family seat is Johnstown Kennedy, Rathcoole, County Dublin. As of 2026 the Official Roll of the Baronetage shows the baronetcy as dormant.

== Kennedy baronets, of Johnstown Kennedy (1836) ==
- Sir John Kennedy, 1st Baronet (1785–1848)
- Sir Charles Edward Bayly Kennedy, 2nd Baronet (1820–1880)
- Sir John Charles Kennedy, 3rd Baronet (1856–1923)
- Sir John Ralph Bayly Kennedy, 4th Baronet (1896–1968)
- Sir James Edward Kennedy, 5th Baronet (1898–1974)
- Sir Derrick Edward de Vere Kennedy, 6th Baronet (1904–1976)
- Sir (George) Ronald Derrick Kennedy, 7th Baronet (1927–1988)
- Michael Edward Kennedy, 8th Baronet (1956–2012)
- George Matthew Rae Kennedy, 9th Baronet (born 1993)

The heir presumptive is Robert Edward Kennedy (born 1940), a kinsman of the present holder.

== Extended family ==
Francis William Kennedy (1862–1939), son of Robert Kennedy, fifth son of the first Baronet, was an Admiral in the Royal Navy.

== Notes ==
Baronetage of the United Kingdom
Preceded by Macnaghten baronets	Kennedy baronets of Johnstown Kennedy; 18 July 1836	Succeeded by Houston baronets
