= 1789 United States House of Representatives elections in Georgia =

- February 9, 1789

All 3 Georgia seats to the United States House of Representatives
	Majority party
Party	Anti-Administration
Seats won	3
Seat change	▲3
- Anti-Administration gain Undistricted territory

Congressional elections to the 1st United States Congress were held in Georgia on February 9, 1789, for the state's three congressional districts. All elected representatives were members of the Anti-Administration political faction in Congress.

The Georgia Election Act of 1789 established a mixed at-large/district system for congressional elections. Under the act, representatives were elected at-large on a general ticket but for three district-based seats, for which candidates were required to be residents. Each voter was allowed to cast three votes, one for a candidate in each district. Some candidates received votes in multiple districts.

The election returns were opened on February 26. Only the returns of Richmond, Wilkes, Effingham, Chatham, Liberty, Burke, and Washington Counties were counted, as they had been received in time. The returns from Greene, Glynn, and Camden Counties came in too late but were published anyways. All elected representatives would've won with the returns of those counties included.

== Lower District ==
1789 Georgia's Lower congressional district election
- February 9, 1789
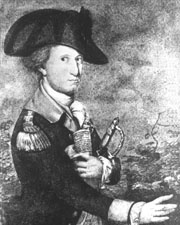

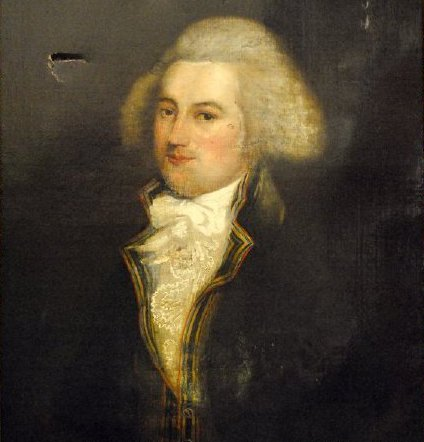
Nominee	James Jackson	William Houstoun
Party	Anti-Administration
Alliance	Jackson party
Popular vote	573	379
Percentage	57.76%	38.21%
- Jackson: 40–50% 60–70% 80–90% >90% Houstoun: 70–80% Osborne: 50–60% 80–90% No vote/data Non-County area
Elected U.S. Representative
James Jackson
Anti-Administration

The Lower District was also known as the Eastern District or the First District. Jackson led a Savannah-based political faction, referred to as the Jackson party, centered in Coastal Georgia.

1789 Georgia's Lower congressional district election
Party	Candidate	Votes	%
Anti-Administration	James Jackson	573	57.76
Unknown	William Houstoun	379	38.21
Unknown	Henry Osborne	36	3.63
Unknown	James Seagrove	0	0
Unknown	Scattering	4	0.4
Valid votes		992	83.57
Rejected votes		195	16.43
Total		1,187	100

1789 Georgia's Lower congressional district election (With rejected returns)
Party	Candidate	Votes	%
Anti-Administration	James Jackson	604	50.88
Unknown	William Houstoun	399	33.61
Unknown	Henry Osborne	172	14.49
Unknown	James Seagrove	7	0.59
Unknown	Scattering	5	0.42
Total		1,187	100

== Middle District ==
1789 Georgia's Middle congressional district election
- February 9, 1789
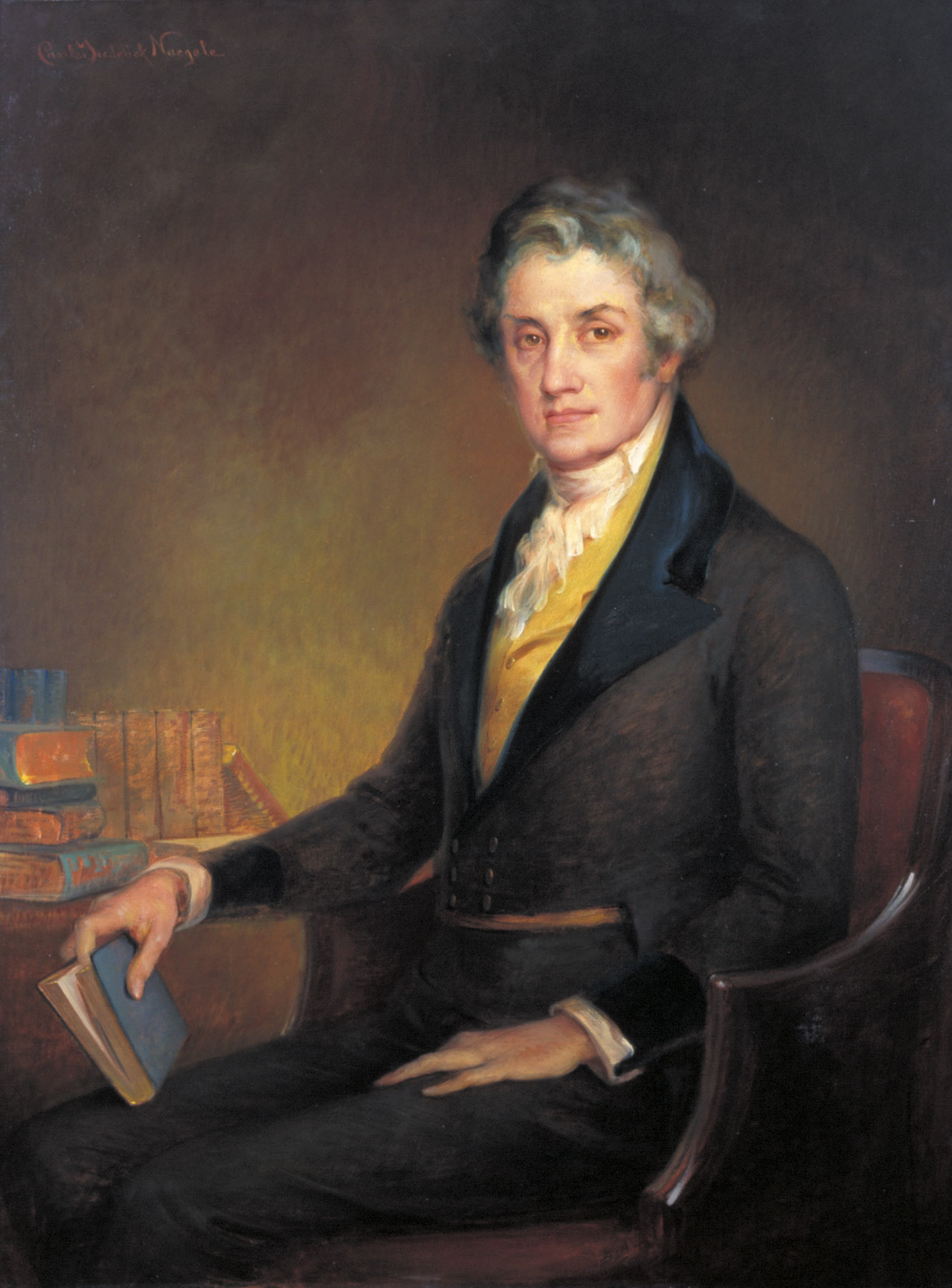

Nominee	Abraham Baldwin	Henry Osborne
Party	Anti-Administration
Popular vote	993	224
Percentage	71.39%	16.10%
- Baldwin: 50–60% 60–70% 70–80% 80–90% >90% Houstoun: 70–80% Sumner: 50–60% No vote/data Non-County area
Elected U.S. Representative
James Jackson
Anti-Administration

The Middle District was also known as the Center District or the Second District.

1789 Georgia's Middle congressional district election
Party	Candidate	Votes	%
Anti-Administration	Abraham Baldwin	993	71.39
Unknown	Henry Osborne	224	16.10
Unknown	Joseph Sumner	117	8.41
Unknown	Isaac Briggs	42	3.02
Anti-Administration	James Jackson	7	0.50
Unknown	William Houstoun	4	0.29
Unknown	Scattering	4	0.29
Valid votes		1,391	87.82
Rejected votes		193	12.18
Total		1,584	100

1789 Georgia's Middle congressional district election (With rejected returns)
Party	Candidate	Votes	%
Anti-Administration	Abraham Baldwin	1,096	69.19
Unknown	Henry Osborne	241	15.21
Unknown	Joseph Sumner	165	10.42
Unknown	Isaac Briggs	42	2.65
Unknown	William Houstoun	23	1.45
Anti-Administration	James Jackson	9	0.57
Unknown	Scattering	8	0.51
Total		1,584	100

== Upper District ==
1789 Georgia's Upper congressional district election
- February 9, 1789
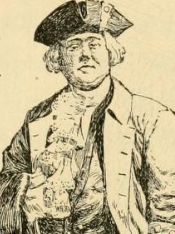

Nominee	George Mathews	Joseph Sumner
Party	Anti-Administration
Popular vote	1,048	3
Percentage	98.87%	0.28%
- Mathews: >90% Osborne: >90% No vote/data Non-County area
Elected U.S. Representative
James Jackson
Anti-Administration

The Upper District was also known as the Western District or the Third District.

1789 Georgia's Middle congressional district election
Party	Candidate	Votes	%
Anti-Administration	George Mathews	1,048	98.87
Unknown	Joseph Sumner	3	0.28
Unknown	Henry Osborne	1	0.09
Unknown	Anthony Wayne	0	0
Unknown	Scattering	8	0.76
Valid votes		1,060	88.11
Rejected votes		143	11.89
Total		1,203	100

1789 Georgia's Middle congressional district election (With rejected returns)
Party	Candidate	Votes	%
Anti-Administration	George Mathews	1,158	96.26
Unknown	Joseph Sumner	24	2.00
Unknown	Anthony Wayne	8	0.67
Unknown	Henry Osborne	5	0.42
Unknown	Scattering	8	0.67
Total		1,584	100

== See also ==
- 1788–89 United States House of Representatives elections
- List of United States representatives from Georgia
