= William Houstoun (lawyer) =

American Founding Father and politician

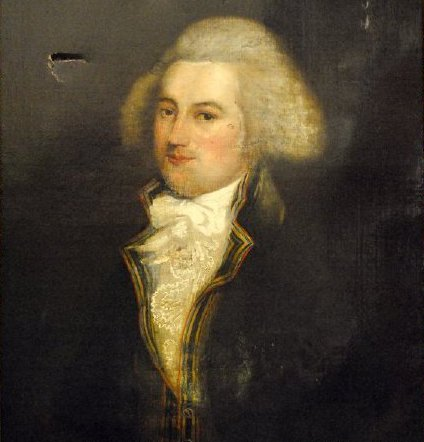
- 1791 portrait of Houstoun by Archibald Robertson
- Born: 1755; Savannah, Province of Georgia
- Died: March 17, 1813 (aged 57–58); Savannah, Georgia, U.S.
- Resting place: St. Paul's Chapel, New York City
- Citizenship: Georgia (1755–1776); United States (1776–1813)
- Education: Inner Temple, London
- Occupations: Lawyer; planter; statesman; delegate from the Province of Georgia to the Congress of the Confederation; delegate from the State of Georgia to the Constitutional Convention
- Spouse: Mary Bayard (m. 1786; died 1806)
- Father: Sir Patrick Houstoun

William Houstoun (/ˈhaʊstən/ HOW-stən; 1755 – March 17, 1813) was a Founding Father of the United States, statesman, and lawyer. He served the Province of Georgia as a delegate to the Continental Congress and later the State of Georgia to the United States Constitutional Convention in 1787.

== Early and personal life ==
William Houstoun was born in Savannah, Georgia, the son of Sir Patrick Houstoun, 5th Baronet of Houstoun (c. 1697–1762) and member of the council under the royal government of Georgia. Houstoun received a liberal education, which included legal training at Inner Temple in London.

Houstoun married Mary Bayard (born 1766), the daughter of Nicholas Bayard, a member of the prominent Bayard family of New York City, from which Bayard Street takes its name.

== Role in the Continental Congress ==
The American Revolution cut short his training, and Houstoun returned home to Georgia. For many years members of Houstoun's family had been high officials in the colony. With the onset of war, many remained loyal to the crown, but William, a zealous advocate of colonists' rights, was among the first to advocate for colonial resistance to British policies.

Houstoun represented Georgia in the Continental Congress from 1783 through 1786. He was an unsuccessful candidate for the U.S. House of Representatives in 1789.

He was chosen as one of Georgia's agents to settle a boundary dispute with South Carolina in 1785 and was one of the original trustees of the University of Georgia at Athens.

=== Delegate to the Georgia Convention ===
When the Constitutional Convention convened in 1787, Houstoun presented his credentials as one of Georgia's delegates. He stayed for only a short time, from June 1 until about July 23, but he was present during the debate on the representation question. Houstoun split Georgia's vote on equal representation in the Senate, voting "nay" against Abraham Baldwin's "aye." His fellow Georgia delegate William Pierce wrote of him: "As to his legal or political knowledge, he has very little to boast of. Nature seems to have done more for his corporeal than mental powers. His Person is striking, but his mind very little improved with useful or elegant knowledge."

Houstoun also reportedly threatened to kill a reverend living in Rhode Island for making a critical remark about the South. Biographer Edith Duncan Johnston finds room for flattery despite this, writing: "Loyal to his native state and section, he was quick to avenge any insinuation that reflected against either."

Pierce was also flexible in his assessment, or simply looking towards posterity, concluding Houstoun had "good and honorable principles" in his notes from the 1850s.

== Death and legacy ==
Houstoun died in Savannah on March 17, 1813, and was interred in St. Paul's Chapel in New York City.

Houston Street in the New York City borough of Manhattan, originally part of his father-in-law's estate, was named for Houstoun, although the spelling of the street's name became corrupted some time after 1811. Houston Street in Savannah is also named for him.
