= St. John's Lodge (Portsmouth, New Hampshire) =

Coordinates: 43°04′35″N 70°45′15″W

St. John's Lodge No. 1
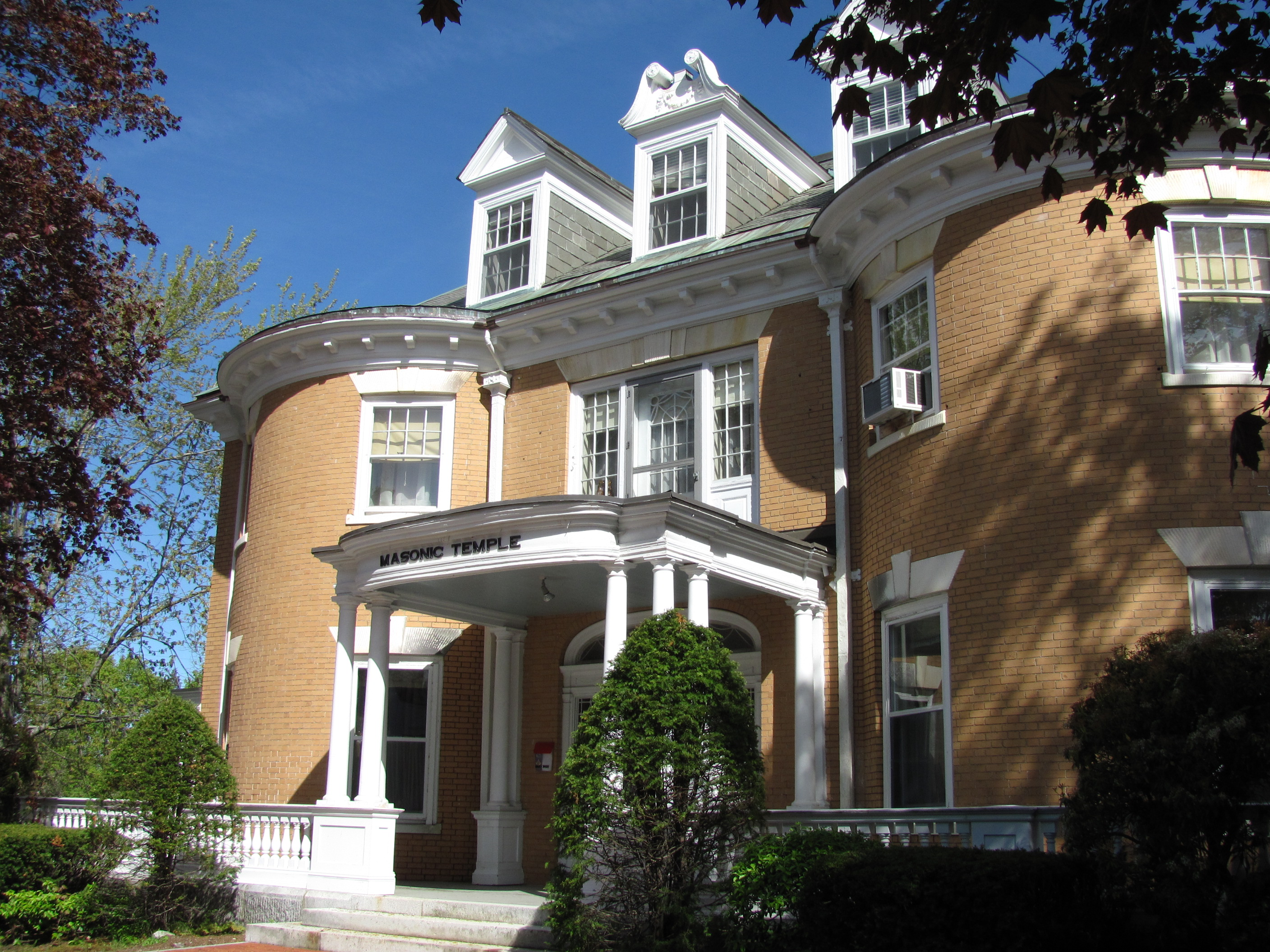
- Current meeting hall of St. John's Lodge
- Formation: 1736
- Location: Portsmouth, New Hampshire
- Affiliations: Grand Lodge of New Hampshire
- Website: portsmouthfreemasons.org

St. John's Lodge in Portsmouth, New Hampshire, United States, is the oldest Masonic lodge in New Hampshire and was one of two founding lodges of the Grand Lodge of New Hampshire. It was founded by 1736. A 1735 letter from Portsmouth Freemasons said they had been working under Constitutions for some time. The lodge claims to be the oldest continuously operating Masonic lodge in the Americas, a title also claimed by Solomon's Lodge in Savannah, Georgia, which was founded in 1734.

== History ==
In 1735, six freemasons, who claimed to be of the "Holy and exquisite Lodge of St. John," applied to the Grand Master of the Society of Free and Accepted Masons in Boston to be authorized as a lodge. In their application, dated to both February 5, 1736 and June 25, 1735, they claimed that they had a constitution formed, and it was believed that the petition was granted soon after. According to the Grand Lodge of New Hampshire, "Robert Tomlinson, by virtue of a deputation from the Earl of Loundon, Grand Master of Masons in England, did. in the year 1736, erect and constitute a regular lodge of Free and Accepted Masons in Portsmouth, New Hampshire, by the name of St. John's Lodge." Although the exact date of when the lodge was established is unknown, it is certain that it existed since 1736.

They would be the only lodge in New Hampshire until March 20, 1762, when the Grand Lodge of St. John's allowed for Portsmouth to have a second lodge, St. Patrick's, which was not acted upon until March 30, 1763. When St. Patrick's Lodge discontinued in 1790, its remaining members merged with the St. John's Lodge.

In 1789, representatives of five lodges, including St John's, gathered at Portsmouth and resolved, "That there be a Grand Lodge established in the State of New Hampshire, upon principles consistent with and subordinate to the General Regulations and Ancient Constitutions of Free- masonry." Soon after, the Grand Lodge of New Hampshire was formed and was finalized on April 8, 1790. Until that time, St. John's was under the Massachusetts Grand Lodge and applied for a transfer to the New Hampshire lodge on April 28, 1790. During the meetings determining the foundation of the New Hampshire Grand Lodge, only a representative from St John's Lodge was present at each.

== Community ==
St John’s Lodge regularly supports charities and community events such as Big Brothers Big Sisters of America, Boy Scouts, and Toys for Tots, along with several academic scholarships. The lodge also manages and sponsors the annual Out of Hibernation 5K road race which takes place every April in Portsmouth, on a Saturday. Proceeds from this road race are donated to various charities such as the Wounded Warrior Project and the Seacoast Family Food Pantry.

St. John's Lodge celebrated its 275th anniversary of continuous operation in 2011 with a parade through Downtown Portsmouth.

== Prominent members ==
Many members of St. John's Lodge have held prestigious positions throughout history in the armed forces, government, and public service, including twelve mayors of Portsmouth, New Hampshire. Several prominent members of the Lodge are listed below.

Name	Notability	References
Joseph Cilley	American colonel in the Revolutionary War who led forces during the Saratoga campaign, Battle of Stony Point, and Battle of Monmouth, member of the New Hampshire Senate (1790–1791)	
Samuel Cushman	Member of the U.S. House of Representatives from New Hampshire (1835–1839)	
Henry Dearborn	Served in George Washington's Continental Army and as a commanding general in the War of 1812, 5th U.S. Secretary of War (1801–1809), 7th U.S. Minister to Portugal (1822–1824), member of the U.S. House of Representatives from Massachusetts (1793–1797)	
Nicholas Gilman	Founding Father and signatory of the U.S. Constitution, member of the U.S. Senate from New Hampshire (1805–1814), member of the U.S. House of Representatives from New Hampshire (1789–1797)	
Ichabod Goodwin	27th Governor of New Hampshire (1859–1861)	
Nathan Hale	American officer in the Revolutionary War who fought in the Battle of Lexington and Concord, Battle of Bunker Hill, Siege of Fort Ticonderoga, and Battle of Hubbardton	
John Adams Harper	Member of the U.S. House of Representatives from New Hampshire (1811–1813)	
Henry Hubbard	18th Governor of New Hampshire (1842–1844), member of the U.S. Senate from New Hampshire (1835–1841), member of the U.S. House of Representatives from New Hampshire (1829–1835)	
Frank Jones	Member of the U.S. House of Representatives from New Hampshire (1875–1879), mayor of Portsmouth, New Hampshire (1868–1869)	
Woodbury Langdon	Delegate to the Continental Congress (1779–1780), associate justice of the New Hampshire Superior Court (1782–1783, 1786–1791)	
Edward St. Loe Livermore	Member of the U.S. House of Representatives from Massachusetts (1807–1811), associate justice of the New Hampshire Supreme Court (1797–1799)	
Samuel Livermore	President pro tempore of the U.S. Senate (1796, 1799), member of the U.S. Senate from New Hampshire (1793–1801), member of the U.S. House of Representatives from New Hampshire (1789–1793)	
Pierse Long	American colonel in the Revolutionary War who led forces during the Saratoga campaign and the Battle of Fort Ann, delegate to the Continental Congress (1785–1786)	
Wesley Powell	70th Governor of New Hampshire (1959–1963), chair of the National Governors Association (1961–1962)	
Alexander Scammell	American colonel in the Revolutionary War, highest ranking American officer killed during the Siege of Yorktown	
Clement Storer	Member of the U.S. Senate from New Hampshire (1817–1819), member of the U.S. House of Representatives from New Hampshire (1807–1809)	
George Sullivan	Member of the U.S. House of Representatives from New Hampshire (1811–1813), Attorney General of New Hampshire (1805–1806, 1816–1835)	
John Sullivan	American general in the Revolutionary War that won several key battles including the Delaware crossing, delegate in the Continental Congress where he signed the Continental Association, 3rd Governor of New Hampshire (1789–1790), judge of the United States District Court for the District of New Hampshire (1789–1795)	
William Whipple	Founding Father and signatory of the Declaration of Independence, represented New Hampshire as a member of the Continental Congress (1776–1779)	

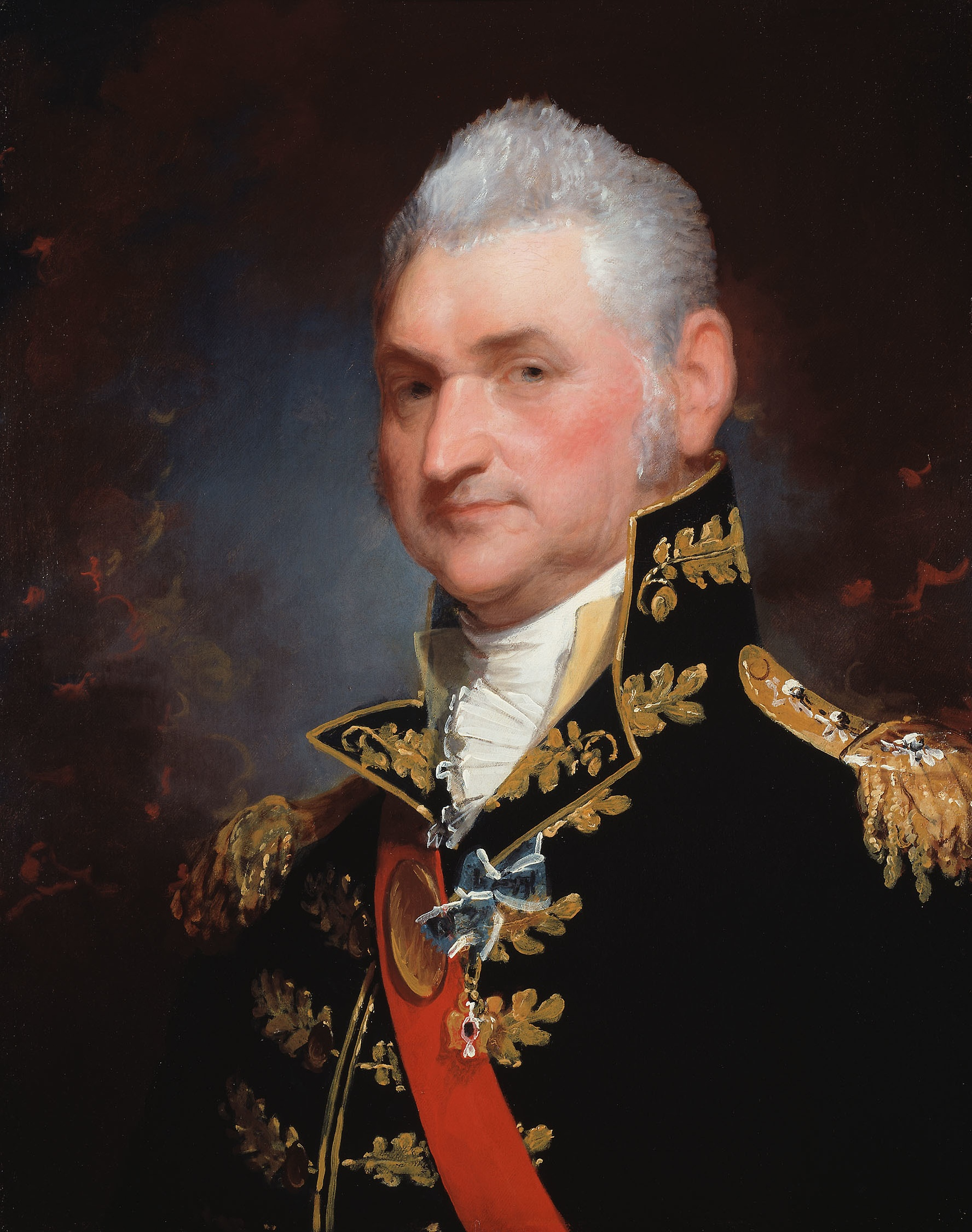
Henry Dearborn

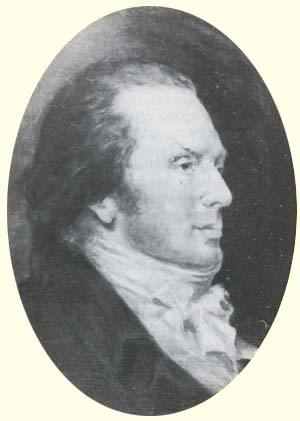
Nicholas Gilman

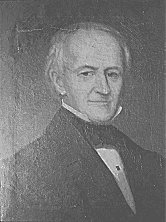
Henry Hubbard

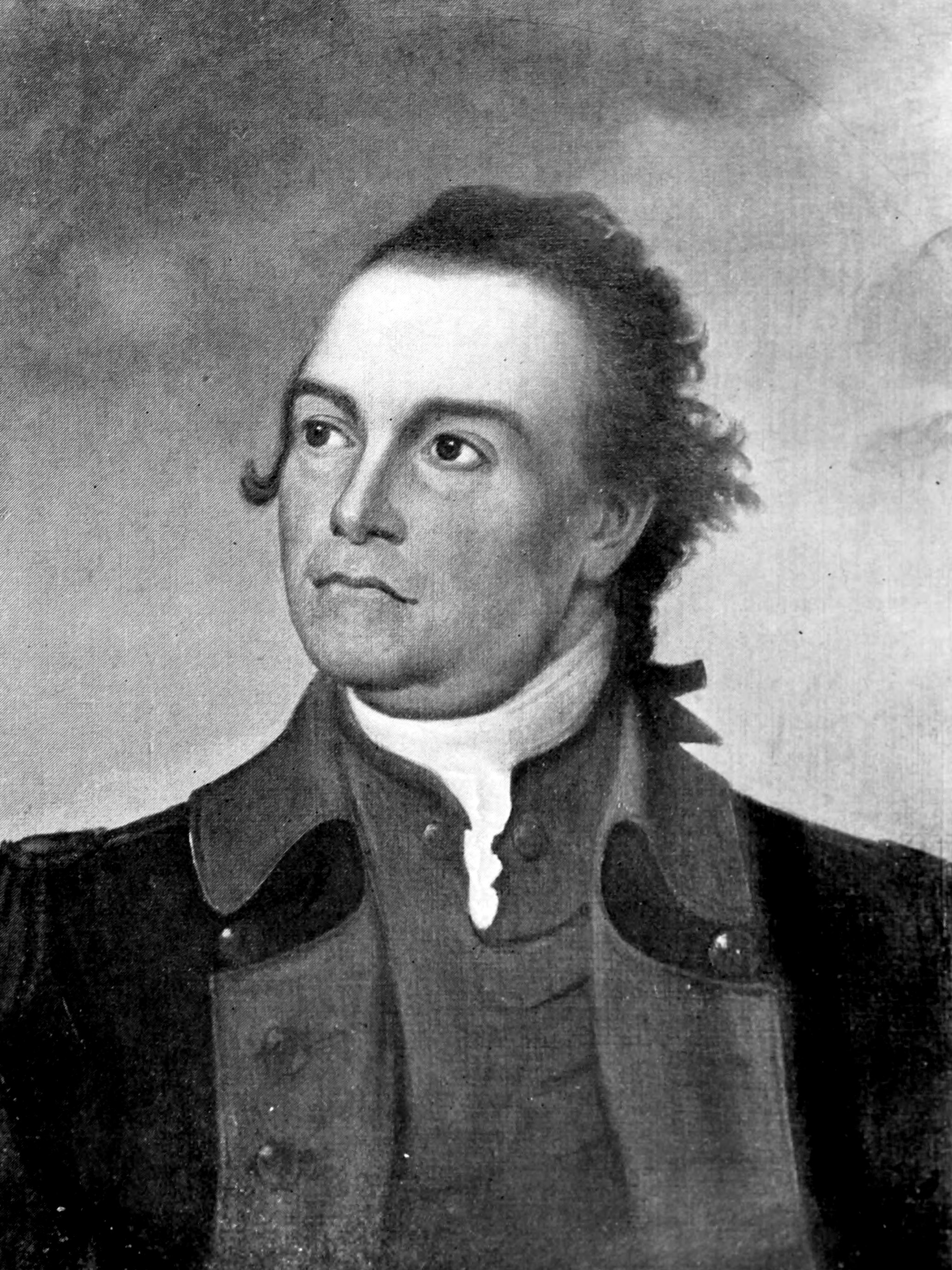
General John Sullivan

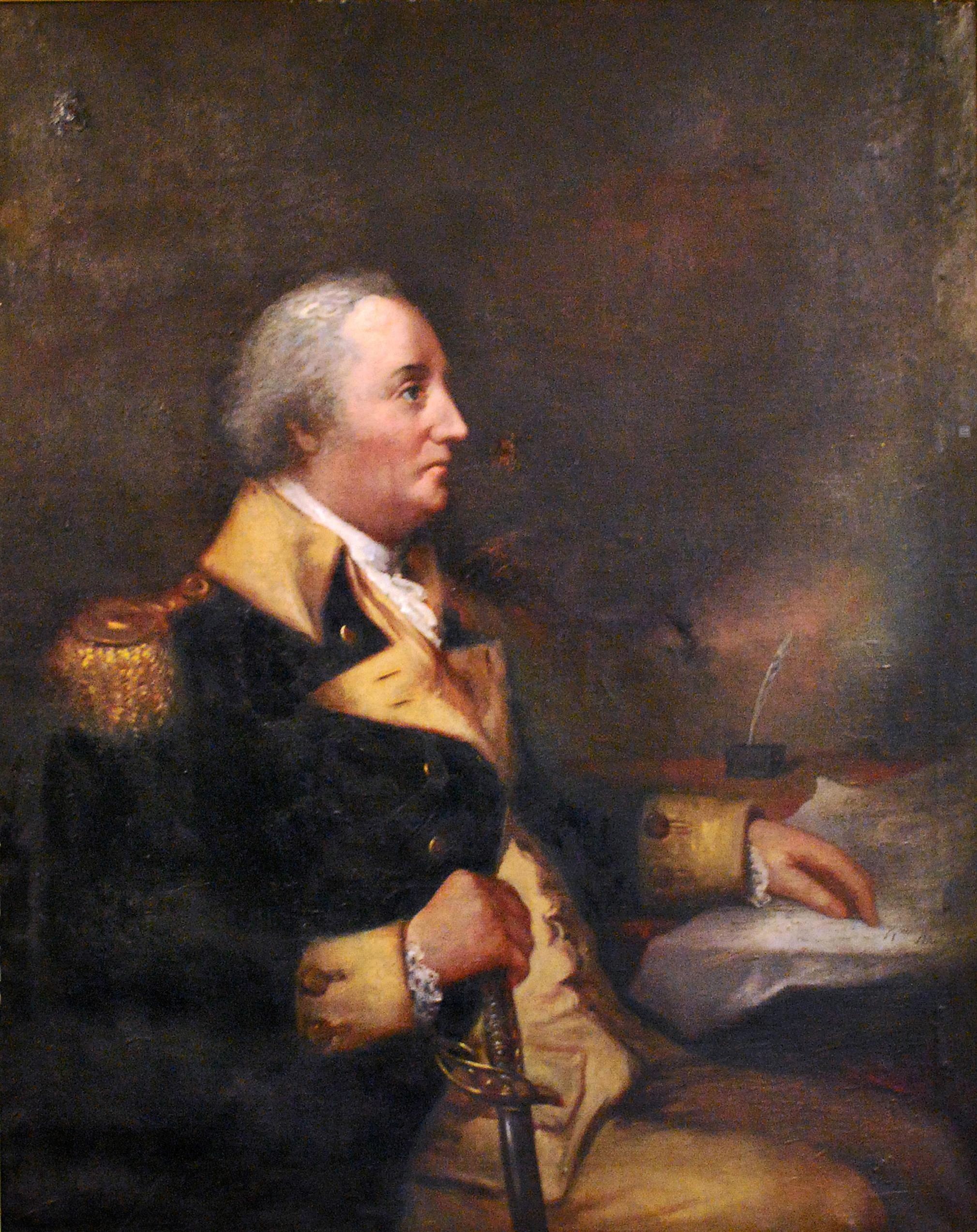
William Whipple
