= Sir John Houston, 3rd Baronet =

British Member of Parliament (died 1722)

Sir John Houston, 3rd Baronet (or Houstoun; died 1722), of Houstoun, Renfrew, and Glasgow, Lanarkshire, was a Scottish Tory politician and Jacobite who sat in the House of Commons between 1708 and 1715.

== Biography ==
Houston was the only son of Sir John Houston, 2nd Baronet, of Houston, Renfrewshire, and his wife Anne Drummond, a daughter of John Drummond, 1st Earl of Melfort. Houston received his education at Glasgow.

Houston was elected as Member of Parliament for Linlithgowshire at a by-election on 22 December 1708. He was returned again at the 1710 British general election. At the 1713 British general election he was defeated in the poll, but was seated on petition on 8 April 1714. He was a Commissary of Glasgow by 1714. In 1717, he succeeded his father to the baronetcy.

== Private life ==
Houston married in 1713, Margaret Schaw, the daughter of Sir John Schaw, 2nd Bt., of Greenock, Renfrew. They had a son and two daughters. On 27 January 1722, Houston died and was succeeded by his son.

Parliament of Great Britain
Preceded by Lord Johnstone	Member of Parliament for Linlithgowshire; 1708–1713	Succeeded by Sir James Carmichael
Preceded by Sir James Carmichael	Member of Parliament for Linlithgowshire; 1714–1715	Succeeded by Sir James Cunynghame
Baronetage of Nova Scotia
Preceded by John Houston	Baronet (of Houston); 1717–1722	Succeeded by John Houston
