= Sir John Houstoun, 2nd Baronet =

Sir John Houstoun of that Ilk, 2nd Baronet (or Houston; died December 1717) was a shire commissioner of the Parliament of Scotland for Renfrewshire from 1685 to 1686 and 1702 to 1707 and for Stirlingshire in 1689 then from 1689 to 1702. (Note: He, his father, and his son were of that Ilk.)

He was the son of Sir Patrick Houstoun, 1st Baronet, of that Ilk, whom he succeeded to the baronetcy in 1696.

Sir John married Lady Anne (3 March 1671 – April 1738), daughter of John Drummond, 1st Earl of Melfort, and Sophia, daughter of Robert Maitland. She was the heiress of Lundin. Their son and his successor, Sir John Houston, 3rd Baronet, of that Ilk, M.P.

== Notes ==
Baronetage of Nova Scotia
Preceded by Patrick Houston	Baronet (of Houston); 1696–1717	Succeeded by John Houston
