= Henry Osborne (American politician) =

American politician

Henry Osborne (August 21, 1751 – November 9, 1800) was a public official from Pennsylvania and Georgia.

== Biography ==
Born in Ireland, he emigrated to Pennsylvania in 1779, where he became a lawyer. He served as a judge advocate of the Pennsylvania militia during the American Revolution, but was removed from office in 1783 by the Supreme Executive Council for bigamy.

After his removal from office, he moved to Georgia, buying land in Camden County. In 1786, he was elected to the Georgia Assembly and served until 1788. He was elected as a delegate to the Continental Congress in 1786 but did not attend. In 1787, he signed the charter of St. Marys and agreed to buy stock in the town.

Henry Osborne served as a Commissioner of the United States for Indian Affairs in the Southern Department in the late 1780s. He negotiated talks between United States officials and the Creek Nation. He became a Georgia Chief Justice in March 1787, an office he held until January 1789 when he became a judge of the Superior Court in the western district. He was also an unsuccessful candidate in an election to the U.S. House of Representatives in 1789. Osborne was impeached and, in his impeachment trial before the Georgia Senate in December 1791, convicted of election fraud in the election of Anthony Wayne to the U.S. House of Representatives, after which he was removed from his judgeship. Since, at the time, the state constitution had left open-ended whether those convicted during impeachment trials would be permanently or only temporarily disqualified from holding office, the state senate opted to impose a thirty-year disqualification. This was cut short in 1798 however, when the state adopted a new constitution that "released" all convictions made under previous impeachments at "restored to citizenship" those convicted in such impeachments.

Osborne died on St. Simons Island November 9, 1800.
