= Sir Patrick Houstoun, 1st Baronet =

British baronet

Sir Patrick Houstoun of that Ilk, 1st Baronet (or Houston; died 1696) was a Scottish politician who served as a shire commissioner of the Parliament of Scotland for Renfrewshire in 1661 and Dunbartonshire in 1681–1682 and of the Convention of the Estates of Scotland for Dunbartonshire in 1678. He was knighted and then created a Baronet of Nova Scotia on 29 February 1668.

== Early life ==
Houstoun was the oldest son of Sir Ludovick (or Louis) Houstoun of that Ilk (d. 1662) by his spouse, Margaret, daughter of Patrick Maxwell of Newark.

== Personal life ==
Sir Patrick Houston married Anne Hamilton, daughter of John Hamilton, 1st Lord Bargany, and had issue, five sons and four daughters. Of the latter, three made very notable Scottish marriages:

- Margaret, married Sir Humphery Colquhoun of Luss, Bt.
- Anne, married three times: (1) Sir James Inglis, 1st Baronet of Cramond, (2) Sir William Hamilton of Whitelaw, (3) Adam Cockburn of Ormiston, Lord Justice Clerk. She is a great-great-grandmother of Sir James Clerk Maxwell.
- Jean, married three times: (1) Walter Dundas of that Ilk, (2) Richard Lockhart of Lee, (3) Ludovick Grant of that Ilk.

Sir Patrick was succeeded by his eldest son and heir, Sir John Houstoun, 2nd Baronet, of that Ilk.

Baronetage of Nova Scotia
New creation	Baronet (of Houston); 1668–1696	Succeeded by John Houston
