= Sir William Houston, 1st Baronet =

British Army officer (1766–1842)

General Sir William Houston GCB Bt GCH
- Born: 10 August 1766
- Died: 8 April 1842 (aged 75); Bromley Hill, Kent, England
- Burial place: Carshalton, Surrey
- Military career
- Allegiance: United Kingdom
- Branch: British Army
- Service years: 1781–1842
- Rank: General
- Commands: 19th Regiment of Foot; 84th Regiment of Foot; 58th Regiment of Foot; 7th Division; South-Western District
- Conflicts: French Revolutionary Wars; Flanders campaign; Capture of Minorca; Siege of Alexandria; Siege of Cairo; Napoleonic Wars; Walcheren Campaign; Peninsular War
- Awards: Knight Grand Cross of the Order of the Bath; Knight Grand Cross of the Royal Guelphic Order; Order of the Crescent

General Sir William Houston, 1st Baronet, GCB, GCH (10 August 1766 – 8 April 1842) was a British Army officer and Governor of Gibraltar. Houston joined the army in 1781, and by the start of the French Revolutionary War was a captain. He fought in the Flanders campaign before being promoted to major in 1794. As a lieutenant-colonel he fought at the Capture of Minorca and at the sieges of Alexandria and Cairo. Promoted to colonel in 1802, Houston fought in the Walcheren Expedition of 1809 before being promoted to major-general.

Houston initially commanded a brigade in the Peninsular War before becoming the first commander of 7th Division in 1811. He left his command later in the year because of illness, having commanded it at the battles of Sabugal and Fuentes de Oñoro and the siege of Badajoz. Houston saw no more active service in the Napoleonic Wars, with a series of staff positions culminating in him serving as acting Governor of Gibraltar in 1832. He died in 1842.

== Military career ==
=== Early service ===
William Houston was born on 10 August 1766, the only child of Andrew Houston of Calderhaugh (Calderhall, or Calder Hall), Kirknewton, West Lothian, Scotland. (Note: T.A. Heathcote correctly identifies the birthplace as "Calderhaugh", or "Calderhall" (Calder Hall) in Wellington's Peninsular War Generals, but incorrectly lists Calderhall as being in Renfrewshire, Scotland, likely due to Heathcote mixing up the Houston-Boswall baronets of Calderhall with the Houston baronets of Johnstone, near Houston, Renfrewshire.) Houston was commissioned into the 31st (Huntingdonshire) Regiment of Foot as an ensign on 18 July 1781. He was promoted to lieutenant on 2 April 1782, and joined an unnumbered regiment raised as a temporary unit; he was promoted to captain within this unit on 13 March 1783. Upon the end of the American Revolutionary War, it was disbanded.

Houston's next regiment was the 19th Regiment of Foot, which he joined on 20 July 1785. With the 19th he served at Jamaica until 1791 when they were transferred to Gibraltar. By the start of the French Revolutionary War in February 1793, the regiment was back in England, and they were soon sent to serve in the Flanders campaign. Here, Houston was promoted to major on 30 May 1794, and was given command of the 19th in the campaign. He was promoted to lieutenant-colonel on 18 March 1795 and as such command the 84th Regiment of Foot until 10 June, when he transferred to the command of the 58th Regiment of Foot.

He commanded the 58th at the Capture of Minorca in 1798. Later on, he commanded a brigade at the sieges of Alexandria and Cairo, for which he received the Turkish Order of the Crescent, second class (KC). Houston was promoted to colonel on 29 April 1802 during the Peace of Amiens, commanding a brigade first at Malta, and then at Brighton to protect against any possible French invasion upon the beginning of the Napoleonic Wars in 1803. Houston commanded another brigade in the Walcheren Expedition of 1809, and was promoted to major general on 25 October, after he had returned home from the failed expedition.

=== Peninsular War general ===
Towards the end of the year Viscount Wellington, commanding the British army in the Peninsular War, requested Houston as a replacement brigade commander, as so many of his had become casualties in the fighting. He arrived in January 1811 and was given command of a brigade in the 4th Division. When the 7th Division was formed in March he was made its first commander. The division's first battle was the Battle of Sabugal on 3 April but with his troops being unseasoned in warfare they were kept in reserve. The division entered combat for the first time at the Battle of Fuentes de Oñoro in May, where his men were crucial in halting a dangerous advance of French cavalry. Houston and the division were also present at the Siege of Badajoz between May and June; he organised two failed forlorn hopes during the siege, one on 6 June and one on 9 June.

=== Later service ===
Houston left the peninsula on 1 July when his health began to deteriorate and was given command of the South-Western District instead, as well as becoming Lieutenant-Governor of Portsmouth. When his health improved again he requested to Wellington that he be given another command in his army but he was declined on the grounds that there were no open commands for him to take up. Houston was promoted to lieutenant general on 4 June 1814 and as a part of the victory celebrations of 1815 he was appointed a Knight Commander of the Order of the Bath. He was further rewarded when he became a Knight Grand Cross of the Royal Guelphic Order in 1827. From 1825 to the accession of Queen Victoria in 1837 he served as a Groom of the Bedchamber to both King George IV and King William IV.

His next active role came when on 8 April 1831 he was appointed Lieutenant-Governor of Gibraltar, a post he held until 28 February 1835. He set up the first official free school on Flat Bastion Road in Gibraltar while he was acting Governor of Gibraltar in 1832. After his term at Gibraltar ended he was created a baronet on 19 July 1836 and was promoted to general on 10 January 1837. He died at his home in Bromley Hill, Bromley, Kent on 8 April 1842 and was interred in the catacombs at West Norwood Cemetery.

== Personal life ==
On 5 November 1808 he married Lady Jane Long, the fourth daughter of James Maitland, 7th Earl of Lauderdale and widow of Samuel Long, who was the brother of Lord Farnborough. William and Mary had two sons together, Sir George Augustus Frederick Houston (b.1809), an army officer and William, who became a captain in the 10th Hussars. William's wife was a prolific writer, Matilda Charlotte Houstoun. Lady Jane died on 1 June 1833.

== Sources ==
- Heathcote, T.A. (2010). Wellington's Peninsular War Generals & Their Battles: A Biographical and Historical Dictionary. Barnsley, South Yorkshire: Pen & Sword. ISBN 978-1-84884-061-4
- Kidd, Charles, Williamson, David (editors). Debrett's Peerage and Baronetage (1990 edition). New York: St Martin's Press, 1990.
- Leigh Rayment's list of baronets
- This article incorporates text from a publication now in the public domain: "Houston, William (1766-1842)". Dictionary of National Biography. London: Smith, Elder & Co. 1885–1900.

Military offices
Preceded by Sir Thomas Maitland	GOC South-West District; January 1814 – September 1814	Succeeded by Lord Howard
Preceded by Sir John Stuart	Colonel of the 20th (the East Devonshire); Regiment of Foot; 1815–1842	Succeeded by Sir James Burns
Government offices
Preceded by George Don (acting)	Governor of Gibraltar (acting); 1831–1835	Succeeded by Sir Alexander Woodford
Baronetage of the United Kingdom
New creation	Baronet; 1836–1842	Succeeded by George Houstoun-Boswall
