= Houstoun-Boswall baronets =

Baronetcy in the Baronetage of the United Kingdom

The Houstoun, later Houstoun-Boswall Baronetcy, is a title in the Baronetage of the United Kingdom.

The title was created on 19 July 1836 for General Sir William Houstoun, GCB. The second Baronet was a Colonel in the Grenadier Guards. In 1847 he assumed by Royal licence the additional surname of Boswall on his marriage to Euphemia, daughter of Thomas Boswall. The sixth Baronet, whose father Colonel Thomas Alford Houston-Boswall-Preston had assumed by Royal licence the additional surname of Preston in 1886, discontinued the use of the surname Preston in 1953.

The seat of the baronetcy was the country manor of Calderhaugh, or Calderhall (Calder Hall), Kirknewton, West Lothian, Scotland until 1800, when the residence was sold to Dr. James Hare and the Hare family, and demolished. The Hares rebuilt a new Calder Hall in the Greek Revival style, designed in 1824 by the King's architect Robert Reid (c. 1774–1856), which stood for over a century before falling to ruin. It was demolished in 1970 to build more housing to accommodate the population growth of East Calder.

== Houston, later Houston-Boswall baronets (1836) ==
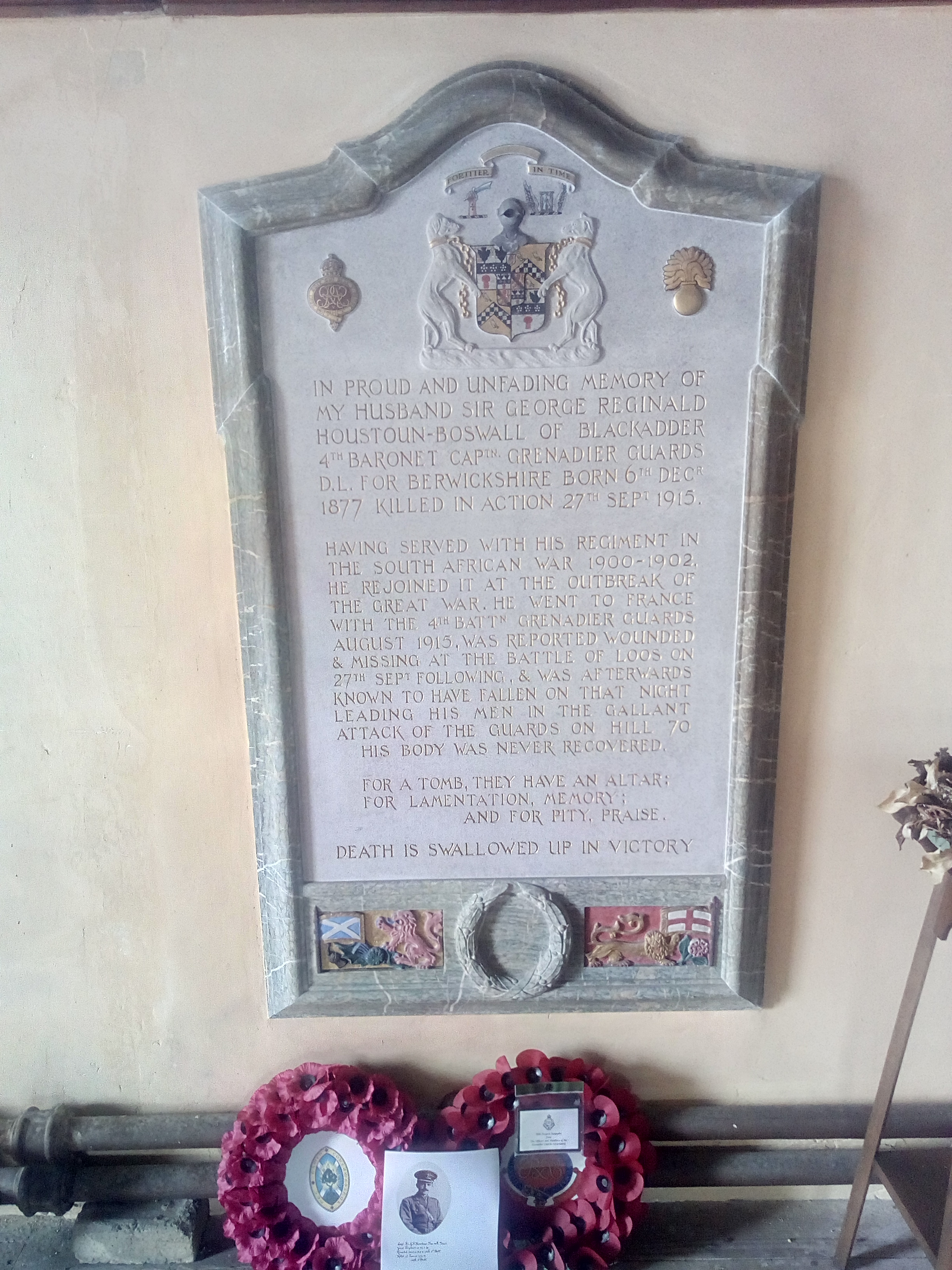
Monument to the 4th baronet in Edrom Church

- Sir William Houstoun, 1st Baronet (1766–1842)
- Colonel Sir George Augustus Frederick Houstoun-Boswall, 2nd Baronet (1809–1886)
- Sir George Lauderdale Houstoun-Boswall, 3rd Baronet (1847–1908) served as a captain, Grenadier Guards. He married Phoebe Mary, daughter of Sir Hugh Allan, of "Ravenscrag" at the Church of St. James the Apostle, Montreal, 1 March 1877. The couple had one daughter and two sons.
- Sir George Reginald Houstoun-Boswall, 4th Baronet (1877–1915). He was killed in World War I, leaving a widow Naomi (née Anstey) and infant daughter Phoebe. They lived at 2 Cornwall Terrace, Regent's Park, London, now named Boswall House.
- Sir Thomas Randolph Houstoun-Boswall, 5th Baronet (1882–1953) (second son of the 3rd Baronet). Both his sons predeceased him, one died in infancy and the other in World War II. The title then passed to his cousin.
- Sir Gordon Houstoun-Boswall, 6th Baronet (1887–1961) (grandson of 2nd Baronet)
- Sir Thomas Houstoun-Boswall, 7th Baronet (1919–1982)
- Sir (Thomas) Alford Houstoun-Boswall, 8th Baronet (born 1947), co-founder and chairman of The Harrodian School (c. 1993)

The heir apparent is Alexander Alford Houstoun-Boswall (born 1972).

Baronetage of the United Kingdom
Preceded by Kennedy baronets	Houston baronets of Johnstown Kennedy; 19 July 1836	Succeeded by Conroy baronets
