= Sheftall =

Sheftall is a surname. Notable people with the name include:

- Beverly Guy-Sheftall (born 1946), American Black feminist scholar, writer and editor
- M. G. Sheftall, American author and scholar living in Japan since 1987
- Mordecai Sheftall (1735–1797), merchant, colonel in the Continental Army

== See also ==
- Levi Sheftall Family Cemetery, historic cemetery in Savannah, Georgia, United States
- Mordecai Sheftall Cemetery, Jewish cemetery in Savannah, Georgia, United States
