= Moses Ferst =

German businessman (1828–1889)

- Born: 24 September 1828; Altdorf bei Nürnberg, Kingdom of Bavaria, Germany
- Died: 13 August 1889 (aged 60); New York City, New York, U.S.
- Resting place: Laurel Grove North Cemetery, Savannah, Georgia, U.S.
- Occupation: Businessman
- Known for: Owner of M. Ferst & Co.
- Spouse: Regina Hannah Epstein

Moses Ferst (24 September 1828 – 13 August 1889) was a German-American businessman based in Savannah, Georgia, where he was a merchant and a noted citizen. A stained-glass window in Savannah's Congregation Mickve Israel, one of the oldest synagogues in the United States, was made and installed in his honour.

== Early life ==
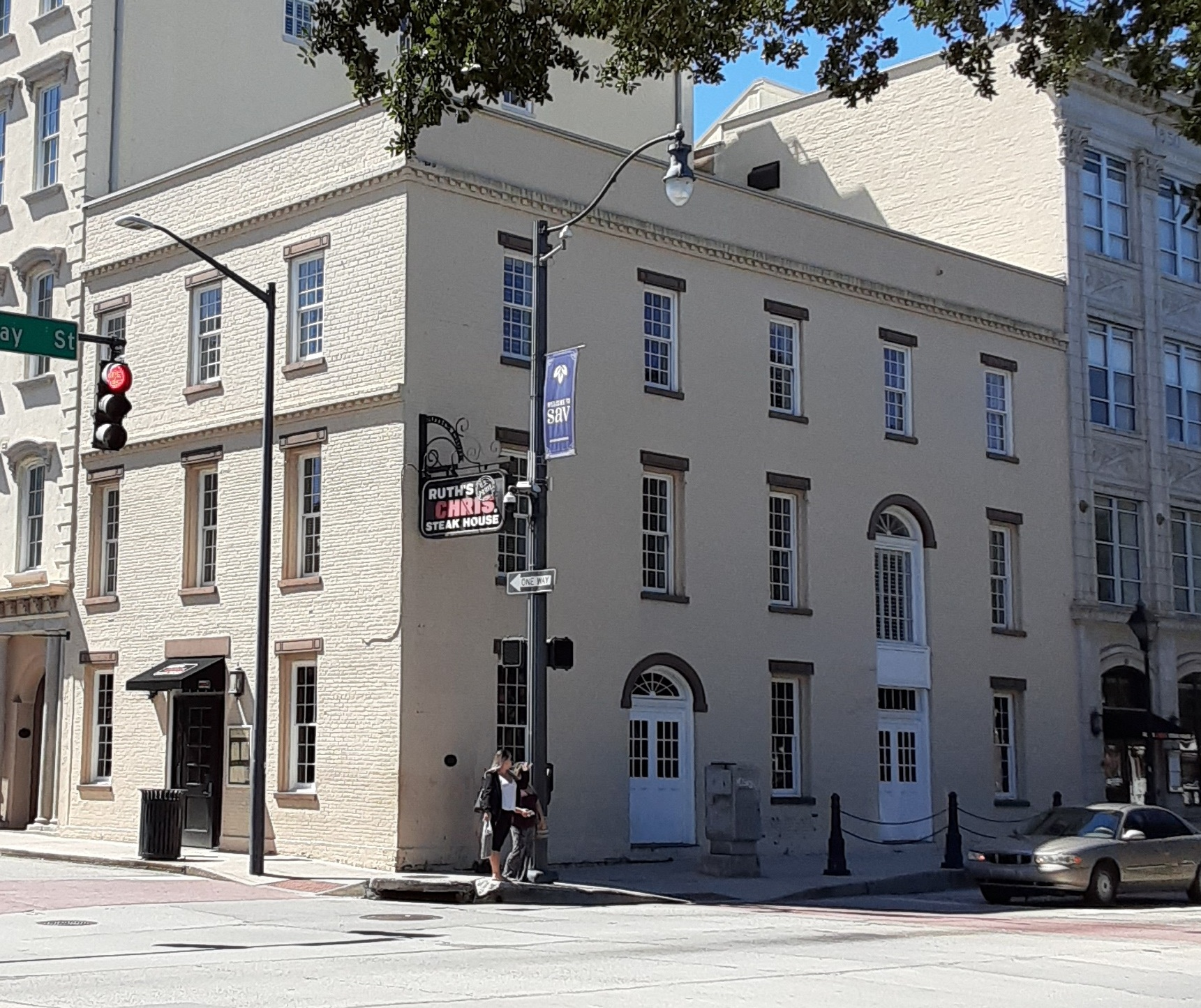
Today's 103 West Bay Street in Savannah, where Ferst was in business before moving across the street to new premises

Ferst was born in 1828 in Altdorf bei Nürnberg, Bavaria, Germany. His family emigrated to the United States in the early 1840s. They settled in New York, where Ferst later founded a wholesale grocery business, Lehman and Ferst, which became very successful. A Jew, he became a member New York's B'nai B'rith Lebanon Lodge.

== Career ==
In June 1865, after the conclusion of the American Civil War, Ferst and his family moved south to Savannah, Georgia, where he established his own wholesale grocery business, M. Ferst and Company, and became recognised as a leading citizen. His company became one of the largest such businesses in the state, and its success allowed it to move to the northern side of Savannah's Bay Street, immediately to the west of the City Exchange, which was replaced in 1905 by today's Savannah City Hall. The business was previously located on the southern side of West Bay Street, at today's number 103. Next door to the west was fellow grocer Simon Guckenheimer – another Bavarian, from Burghaslach. Ferst's sons were also involved in the business at its new location.

The building was demolished in 1969 and replaced, twelve years later, by today's Hyatt Regency Savannah.

== Personal life ==
Ferst married compatriot Regina Hannah Epstein (1835–1874) in New York. They had three children there: Joseph (1858–1926), Aaron Harold (1859–1919) and Rachel (born 1861). Joseph was a director of the Southern Bank of Georgia in 1902.

After moving to Savannah, where the family lived at 108 Liberty Street, the connections he made in the north assisted in the procuring of funds to help build a new (and current) sanctuary at the Congregation Mickve Israel in the 1870s. He was also part of a committee that hired Rabbi Isaac Mendes, who served as the synagogue's rabbi for around 25 years and who officiated at Ferst's funeral.

Prior to Hannah's death in 1874 at the age of around 39, the couple had four more children in Savannah (two of whom died very young): Henry (1866–1867), Gertrude Rebecca (1869–1872), Leopold ("Leon"; 1870–1927) and Miriam ("Mazie") (1874–c. 1885).

Ferst was active in Savannah at the same time as fellow Bavarian, architect Augustus Schwaab.

== Death ==
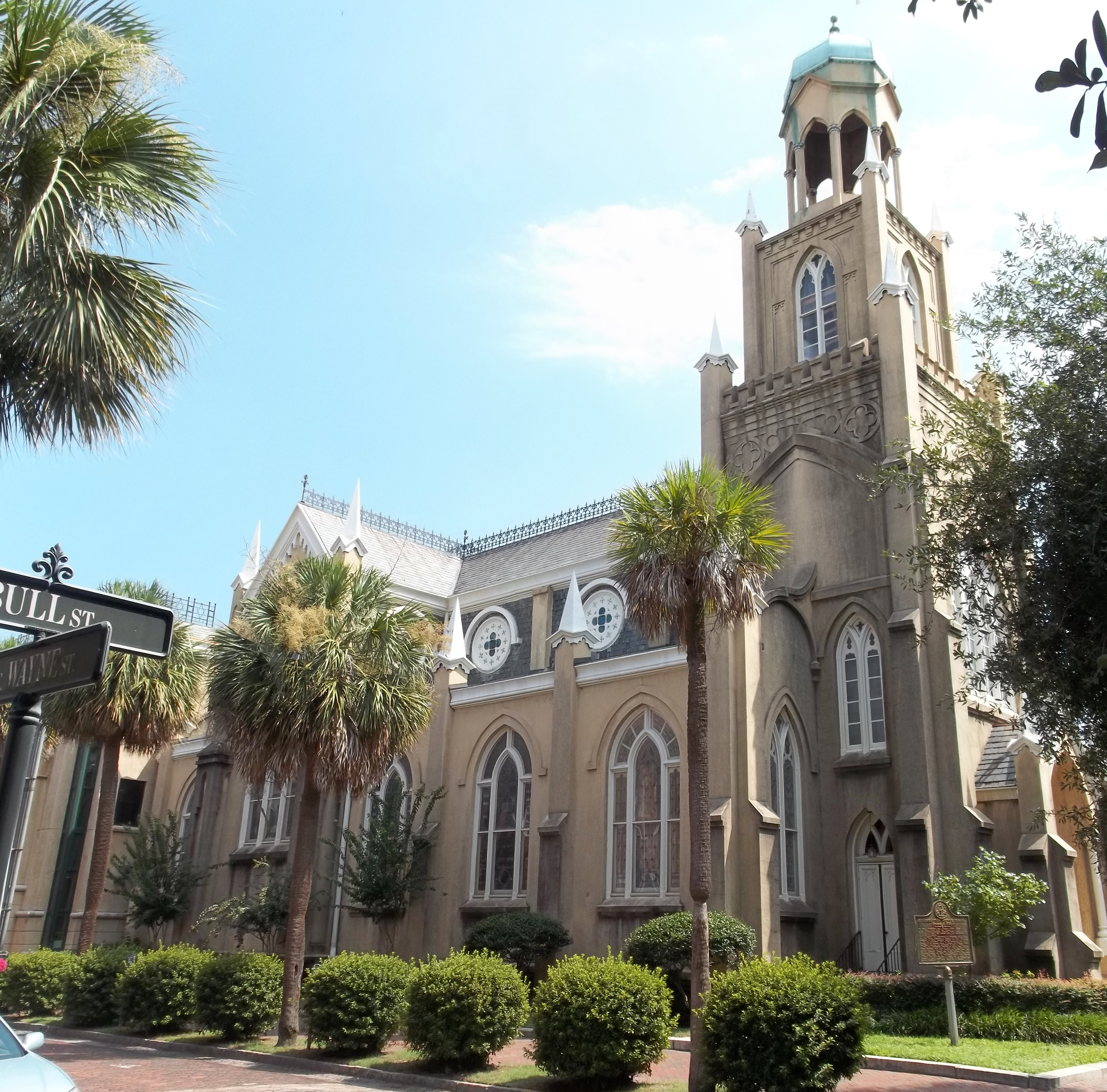
The elevation of the Congregation Mickve Israel that contains the stained-glass window dedicated to Ferst

Ferst died unexpectedly in 1889, at the home of Joseph Strauss, his business partner back in Savannah, while in New York. He had been on vacation in Saratoga for a month, but had been staying with Strauss for a couple of weeks. Ferst was 60 years old, and his death occurred eleven months after the completion and opening of his new grocery building.

His family was informed of the news the following morning. In the care of Strauss, his body was returned to Savannah on the Atlantic Coast steam line on 16 August, and then lay in repose at the family home for a few hours. One of the floral tributes left on his coffin was from the employees at his company; it read "Our Beloved Employer". His funeral took place that afternoon, followed by a burial in Savannah's Laurel Grove North Cemetery. As a mark of respect, several Savannah businesses closed during the service. He is buried alongside his wife, who preceded him in death by fifteen years (she died in 1874, the same year as their final child, Miriam, was born). Six of the Fersts' children are buried at Laurel Grove; Leon is interred in a family tomb in Bonaventure Cemetery.

A stained-glass window in Savannah's Congregation Mickve Israel, one of the oldest synagogues in the United States, was made and installed in his honour. Depicting the Five Books of Moses and the Lion of Judah and containing the wording His soul shall abide in happiness, it is located on the Wayne Street (northern) side of the sanctuary he helped fund. Ferst's granddaughter Ruth Ferst Byck (1905–1992), daughter of Leon, was a member of the congregation and a leader in the community.
