= Simon Guckenheimer =

German businessman (1830–1900)

- Pictured around 1890
- Born: 6 April 1830; Burghaslach, Kingdom of Bavaria, Germany
- Died: 27 February 1900 (aged 69); Savannah, Georgia, U.S.
- Resting place: Laurel Grove North Cemetery, Savannah, Georgia, U.S.
- Occupation: Businessman
- Spouse: Sarah Haas (m. 1860–1900; his death)

Simon Guckenheimer (6 April 1830 – 27 February 1900) was a German-American businessman based in Savannah, Georgia, where he was a "mega-merchant" and a noted citizen. His career has been described as "rags to riches."

== Early life ==
Guckenheimer was born in Burghaslach, Bavaria, Germany, in 1830. After attending school in Nuremberg, he was apprenticed, at the age of 13, to a merchant weaver in his hometown. He emigrated to New York City in 1851, before moving south to Georgia in 1855, firstly to Centerville, Charlton County, then to Savannah, Chatham County.

== Career ==
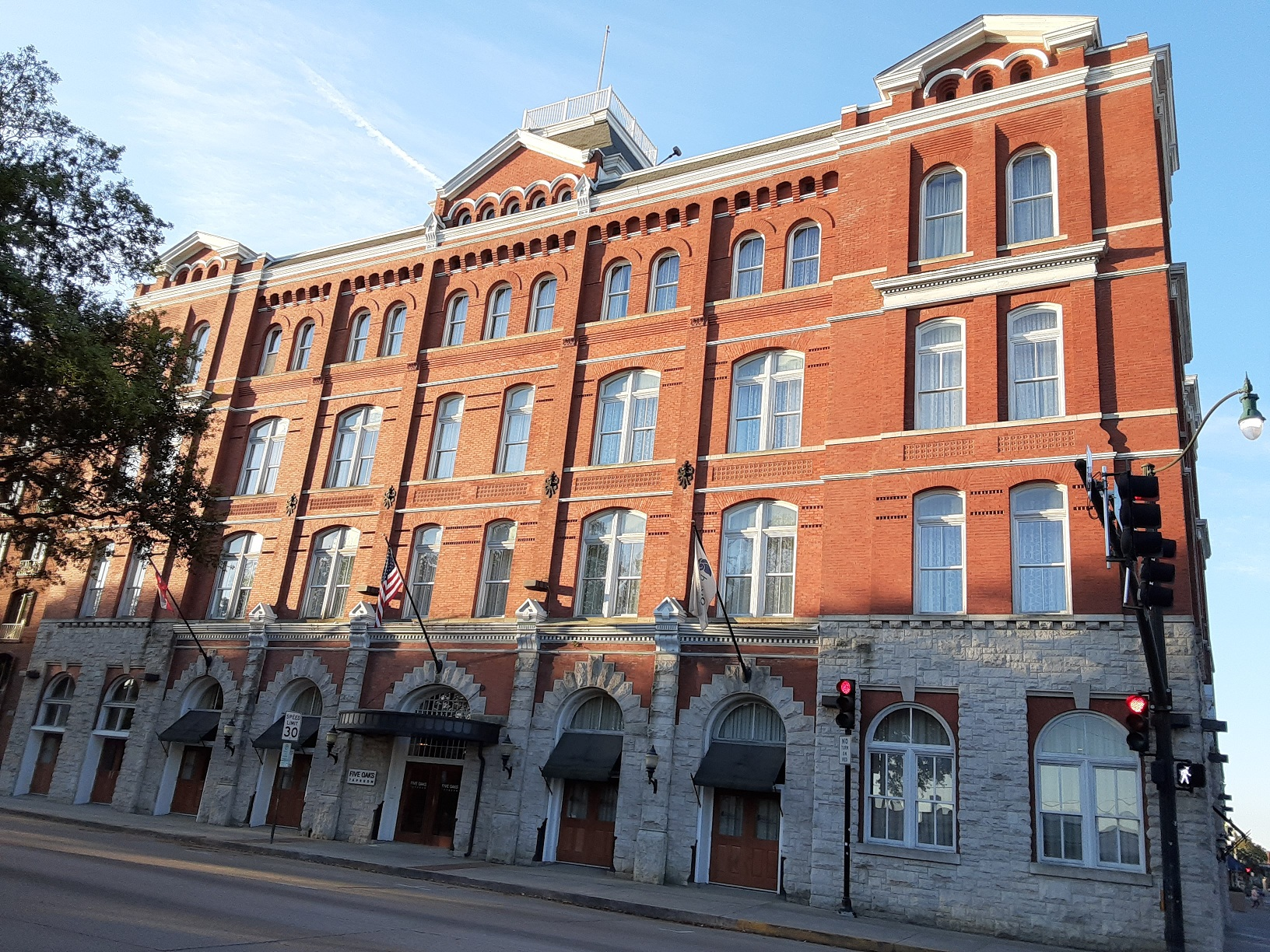
The Simon Guckenheimer Building on West Bay Street in Savannah, Georgia

A wholesale merchant, Guckenheimer sold tobacco, groceries and flour. He was in partnership to begin with, as Guckenheimer & Selig. Marcus Selig died in 1870, aged 40, but the name of the business remained for two more years. The business was then run under Guckenheimer's name and, later, under S. Guckenheimer & Co. In 1882, he admitted his son, Samuel, into the business, with the business becoming S. Guckenheimer & Son. Samuel's brother, Abraham, joined in 1890, making it S. Guckenheimer & Sons. A third son, Moses, was admitted to the firm, but he died in 1900, aged 27.

Guckenheimer's former dry-goods store, at 225 West Bay Street in Savannah, became Hotel Indigo in 2016.

== Personal life ==
Guckenheimer met Sarah Haas, the daughter of the merchant he apprenticed with as a 13-year-old. He returned to Germany from the United States to propose to her, and they married in Georgia on 23 October 1860. The couple had five children: Samuel, Sabina, Hannah, Abraham and Moses. Samuel died in 1892; the others survived their parents. Hannah married Austrian native Leopold Adler, grandfather of preservationist Lee Adler and who established Adler's department store on Savannah's Broughton Street.

He was president of the Congregation Mickve Israel in Savannah's Monterey Square.

== Death ==
Guckenheimer died in 1900, aged 69, having been sick for several weeks. He was visiting the home of his son-in-law Leopold Adler at 112 Taylor Street (part of Guckenheimer Row) when he died. He was interred in Savannah's Laurel Grove Cemetery. His widow survived him by fourteen years and was buried beside him upon her death, aged 76.

== See also ==
- Moses Ferst
