= Levi Sheftall Family Cemetery =

Historic cemetery in Savannah, Georgia, U.S.

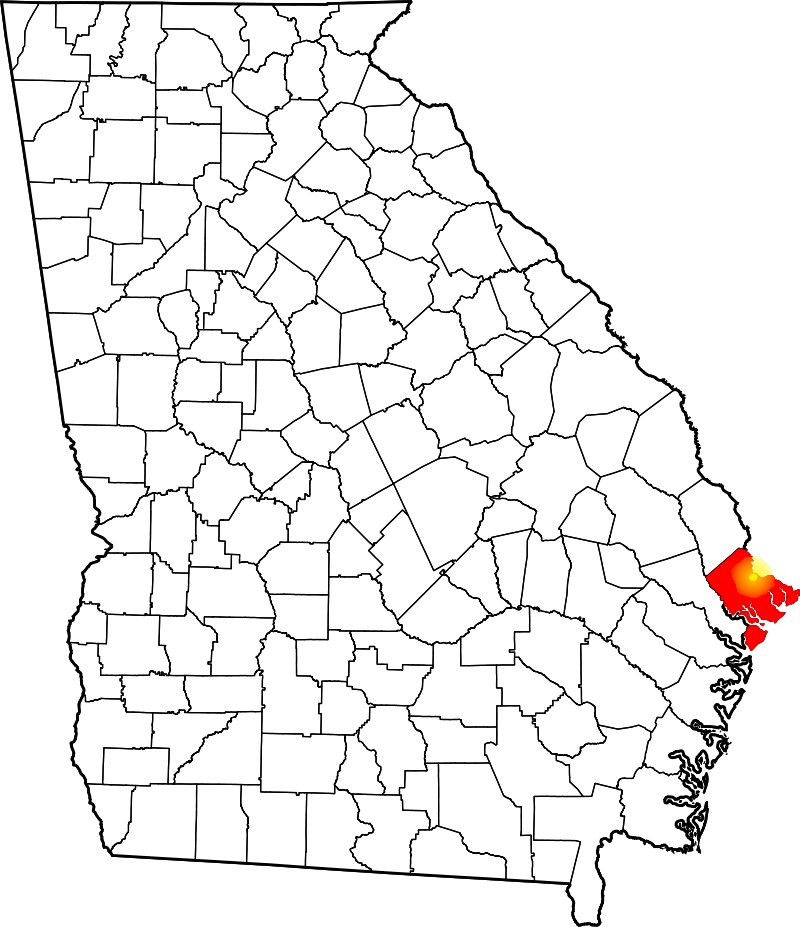
- Map of Georgia, highlighting Chatham County, with a dot showing where the cemetery is located in the county.
- Interactive map of Levi Sheftall Family Cemetery

Details
- Established: 1765
- Closed: 1861
- Location: Savannah, Georgia
- Country: United States
- Coordinates: 32°04′22″N 81°06′10″W
- Owned by: Congregation Mickve Israel
- Size: 25x40 ft
- No. of graves: approximately 84

The Levi Sheftall Family Cemetery, also known as the de Lyon-De La Motta Cemetery or Cohen Street Cemetery, is a historic cemetery in Savannah, Georgia, United States. Located in the Kayton/Frazier area of West Savannah, it is the burial ground for members of the Sheftall, de Lyon, and De La Motta families. The cemetery was established by Levi Sheftall in 1765.

On November 3, 1761, George III "conveyed a certain half lot of land in Holland Tything, Percival Ward, to David Truan." This land was at the northwest corner of today's Bull Street and Oglethorpe Avenue. Several Jews were interred here before the family cemeteries were established. A memorial, in the Oglethorpe Avenue median, marks the burial ground (known as Bull Street Cemetery) today, with a plaque stating: "Original 1733 burial plot allotted by James Edward Oglethorpe to the Savannah Jewish Community".

== History ==
Levi Sheftall's father, Benjamin, arrived in Savannah from London in 1733 on a ship with other European Jews. Benjamin Sheftall was originally from the Prussian town of Frankfurt (present-day Frankfurt an der Oder, Germany). Levi was born in Savannah in 1739 to Benjamin's second wife, Hannah Sheftall (née Solomons). When Benjamin Sheftall died in 1765, he was the first to be interred in a new cemetery that Levi reserved on a 25-by-40-foot plot of land, surrounded by a wall. The cemetery is now located at Cohen Street (formerly Spruce and Cohen Streets) in the Kayton/Frazier neighborhood. In 1773, the cemetery was placed in trust as a family burial ground. Among those later interred there were Levi himself, who died in 1809, and his wife, Sarah Sheftall (née De La Motta), who died two years later, in 1811. The cemetery was closed to burials in 1861.

Today the cemetery is owned and maintained by Congregation Mickve Israel. Few tombstones remain standing. The Mordecai Sheftall Cemetery, founded by Levi's half brother for Savannah's Jewish community, is located across the street.
