= Leopold Adler =

Austrian businessman (1861–1948)

- Born: 10 June 1861; Volyně, Bohemia, Austrian Empire
- Died: 13 January 1948 (aged 86); Savannah, Georgia, U.S.
- Resting place: Bonaventure Cemetery, Savannah, Georgia, U.S.
- Occupation: Businessman
- Spouse: Hannah J. Guckenheimer (m. 1888–1942; her death)

Leopold Adler (10 June 1861 – 13 January 1948) was an Austrian businessman based in Savannah, Georgia.

== Early life ==
Adler was born in Volyně, Bohemia, Austrian Empire, in 1861 to Moses Adler and Rosie Fischl. His family emigrated to New York when he was a child. His father was in a partnership named Adler & Landauer, with Julius Landauer, at 247 East 28th Street in Manhattan by 1878. He later became a paper stock dealer as a partner in Adler & Liebman. Leopold began his working life at the Altmayer department store.

== Career ==
Adler's department store in the 1940s

In 1892 (some sources state 1878, when he would have been 17 years old), Adler moved south to Savannah, Georgia, to become a partner in the city's Altmayer department store, on Savannah's Broughton Street, at its intersection with Bull Street. He later changed the name of the department store to Adler's. Italian native Dominic Paris (1886–1958) owned the beauty department in the store between 1929 and 1948, while Elizabeth Cannon (1903–1984) ran the furniture department between 1939 and 1949.

Adler suffered a cerebral hemorrhage in 1939. After Adler's death nine years later, the business passed to his sons, Samuel and Melvin. A family rift resulted in their sister, Olga, securing their discharge from the business in 1945. Samuel regained control in the 1950s, and he passed it to his son, Sam Jr., by 1959. The Broughton Street store burned down in 1958. The business expanded to two other locations. The one in the Victory Drive Shopping Center closed first; the one in the Oglethorpe Mall was liquidated in 1985.

Adler was a founder of the Savannah Bank & Trust Company, and became its chairman, as he did of the Savannah Sinking Fund Commission between 1925 and his death. He was a founder and president of the Savannah Chamber of Commerce and a director of the Ocean Steamship Company. He was president of Congregation Mickve Israel, in Savannah's Monterey Square, for 25 years.

== Family and late life ==
Adler married Hannah J. Guckenheimer, daughter of Simon Guckenheimer, a German immigrant to Savannah, in 1888. They had five children: Samuel, Melvin, Olga, Rena and Elsie. Hannah died in 1942.

His grandson, Lee Adler, was a noted preservationist in Savannah.

Adler died in 1861, aged 86. He was interred beside his wife in Bonaventure Cemetery.
