= Congregation Mickve Israel =

Reform synagogue in Savannah, Georgia, US

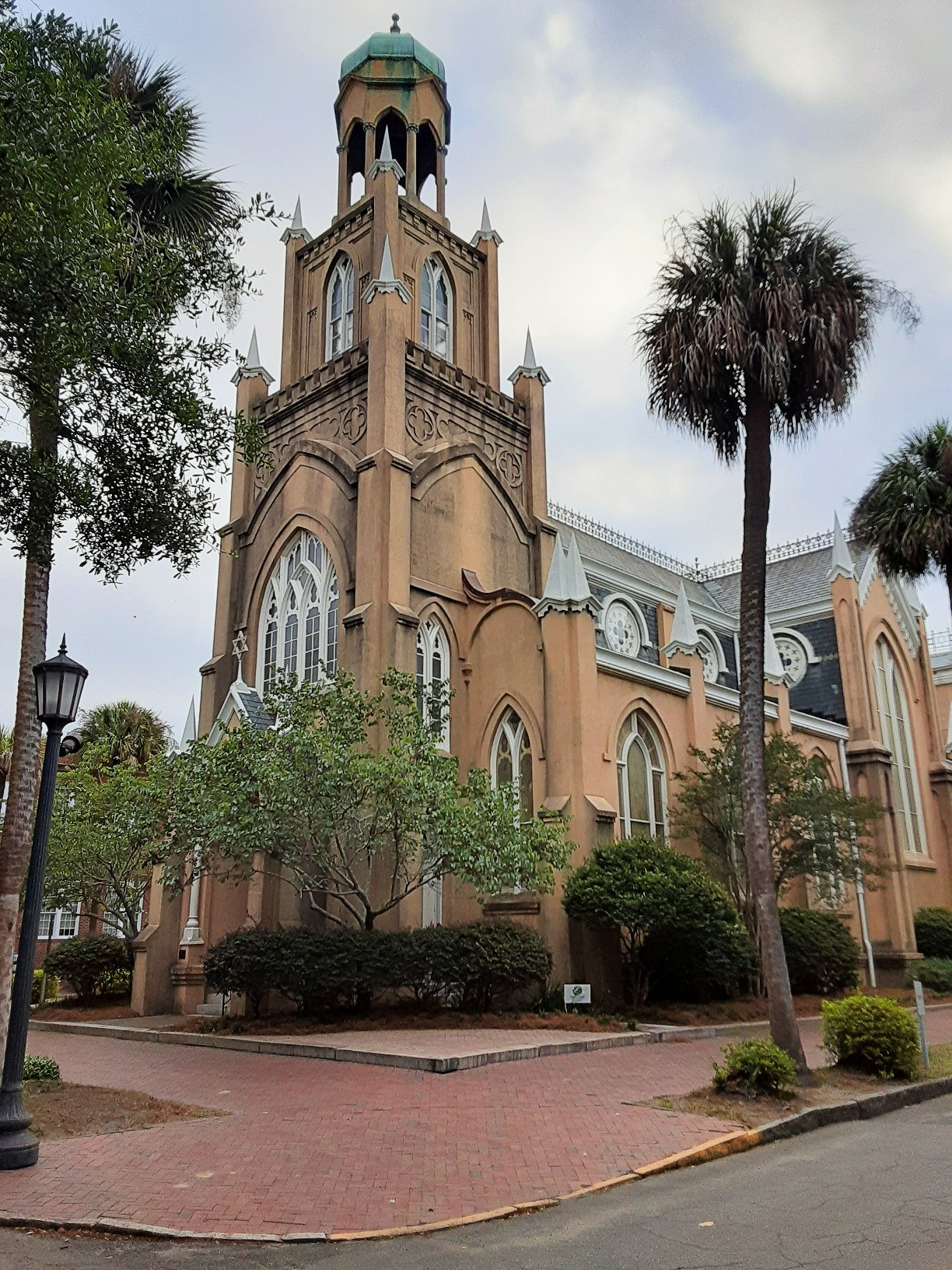
- Mickve Israel's synagogue in 2022

- Location in Georgia

Religion
- Affiliation: Reform Judaism
- Ecclesiastical or organisational status: Synagogue
- Leadership: Rabbi Robert Haas
- Status: Active

Location
- Location: 20 East Gordon Street (also listed as 428 Bull Street), Monterey Square, Savannah, Georgia
- Country: United States
- Coordinates: 32°04′16″N 81°05′39″W

Architecture
- Architect: Henry G. Harrison
- Type: Synagogue
- Style: Gothic Revival
- Established: 1733 (as a congregation)
- Completed: 1820 (Liberty St. #1); 1841 (Liberty St. #2); 1878 (E. Gordon St.)
- Materials: Gilded gold, marble, ivory

Website
- mickveisrael.org
- Congregation Mickve Israel
- U.S. National Historic Landmark District – Contributing property
- Part of: Savannah Historic District (ID66000277)
- Designated NHLDCP: November 13, 1966

Congregation Mickve Israel (transliterated from Hebrew as "Congregation for the Hope of Israel") is a Reform Jewish congregation and synagogue located at 20 East Gordon Street, (Note: Also listed as "428 Bull Street" in some government records.) Monterey Square, in Savannah, Georgia, in the United States. The site also contains a Jewish history museum.

Organized in 1735 by mostly Sephardic Jewish immigrants of Spanish-Portuguese extraction from London who arrived in the new colony in 1733, it is one of the oldest congregations in the United States. The current synagogue was consecrated in 1878, completed in the Gothic Revival-style. The synagogue building is listed on the National Register of Historic Places as a contributing property of the Savannah Historic District.

The congregation has been a member of the Union of American Hebrew Congregations (and its successor organizations) since January 10, 1904.

== History ==
=== Congregation formed ===
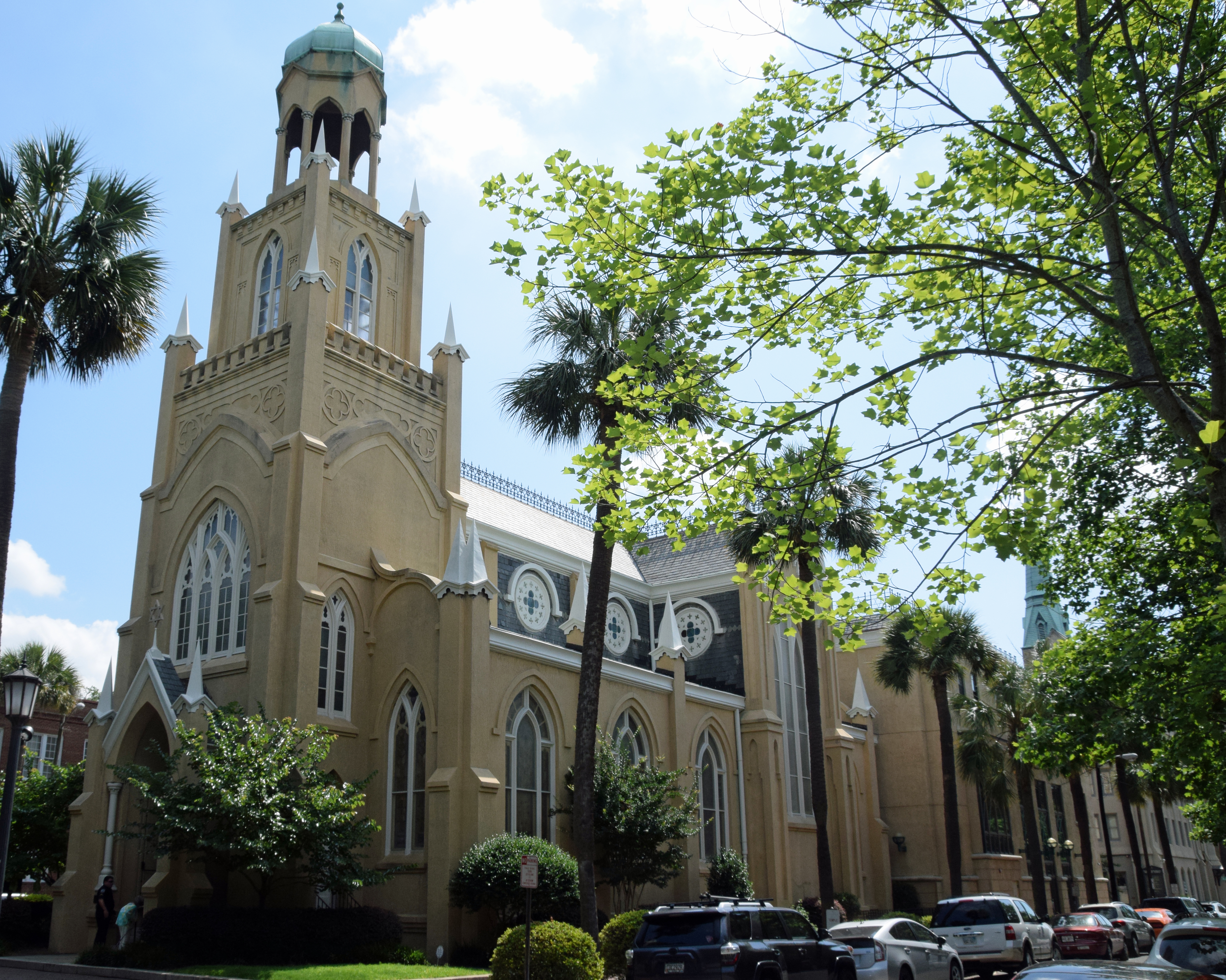
Side view

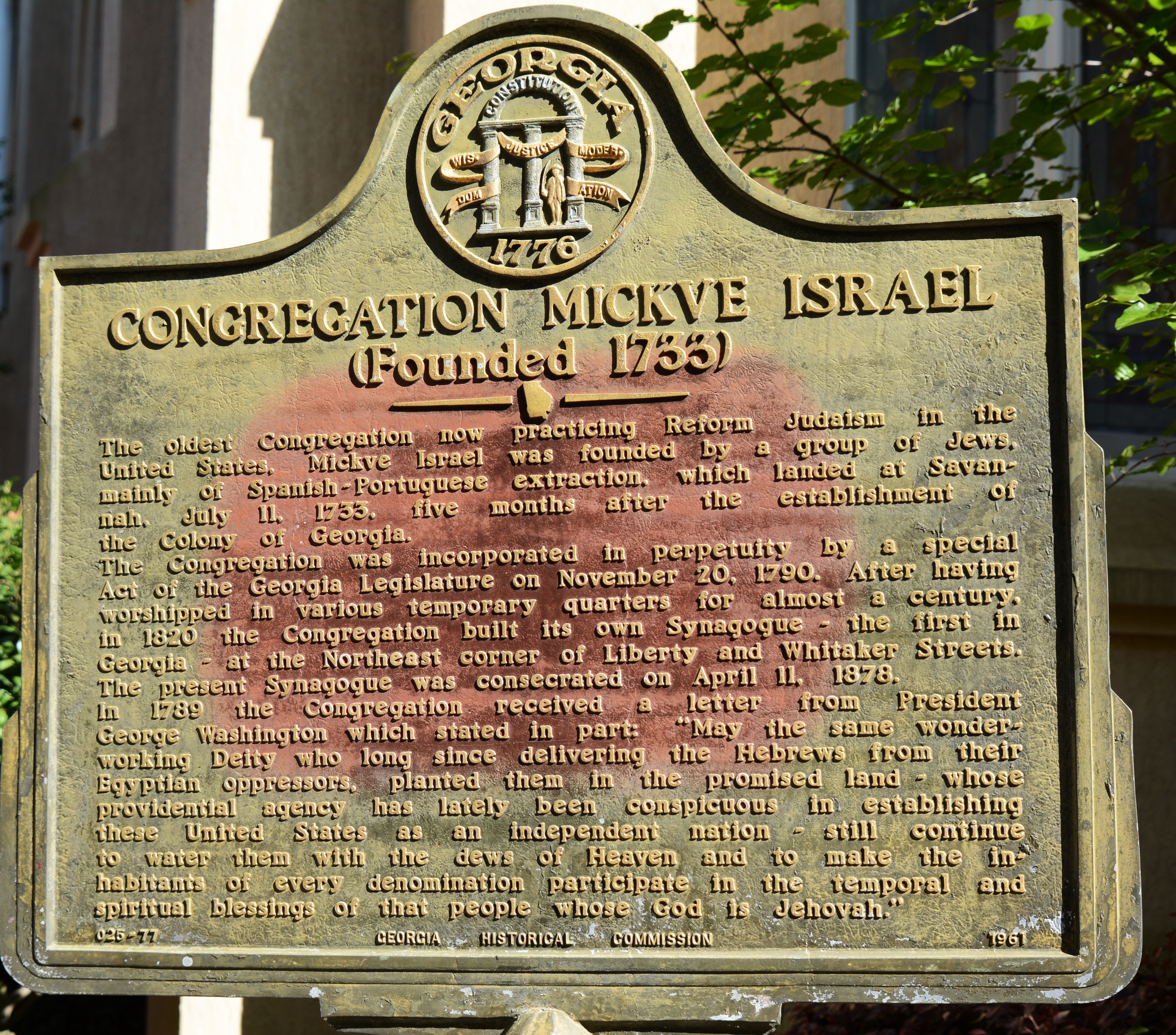
Historical marker

The congregation was established in July 1735 as Kahal Kadosh Mickva Israel (the Holy Congregation, the Hope of Israel); they soon rented a building for use as a synagogue. The congregation was founded by many from a group of 42 Jews who had sailed from London aboard the William and Sarah and had arrived in Savannah on July 11, 1733, months after the colony's founding by James Oglethorpe. All but eight of the group were Spanish and Portuguese Jews, who had fled to England a decade earlier to escape the Spanish Inquisition. In London, many had been members of the Bevis Marks Synagogue. Wealthy members of London's Jewish community, then numbering 6,000, had provided financial assistance to subsidize the initial group and a second ship, which carried additional Jewish colonists to Savannah. The founders of the congregation brought with them a Sefer Torah, which is still used on special occasions at the synagogue.

On July 5, 1742, during The War of Jenkins' Ear between Spain and the Kingdom of Great Britain, Spanish troops landed on St. Simons Island as part of their Invasion of Georgia. Most of the Sephardi Jews abandoned Savannah, fearing that if captured they would be treated as apostates and burnt at the stake. The Abraham Minis family and Sheftall families, Ashkenazi Jews, were the only ones to stay. They gave up the rented synagogue building and held services informally at the home of Benjamin Sheftall.

By 1774, enough Jews had returned to Savannah to justify re-establishing the congregation on a formal basis. At a meeting held the day before Yom Kippur, the assembled group agreed to conduct services in a room that Mordecai Sheftall (Benjamin's son) had prepared for such use.

During the American Revolutionary War, the congregation did not hold formal prayer or religious services. On July 7, 1786, "K. K. Mickvah Israel" was reorganized and they rented a space for use as a synagogue, attracting as many as 70 worshipers. Governor of Georgia Edward Telfair authorized a charter for the "Parnas and Adjuntas of Mickve Israel at Savannah" on November 20, 1790, under which the congregation still operates. By 1793, the congregation had difficulty paying rent and gave up its leased space. While services were held in the homes of members, the congregation maintained its formal structure and elected officers.

In 1997, a recipe for charoset, a paste made of fruits and nuts served as part of the ceremonial Passover Seder, was found from the congregation, which dated to 1794. The recipe described charoset as a "compound formed of almonds, apples, & C. Worked up to the consistence of lime."

The Congregation was the first Jewish community to receive a letter from the President of the United States. In response to a letter sent by Levi Sheftall, the congregation's president, congratulating George Washington on his election as the first President, Washington replied, "To the Hebrew Congregation of the City of Savannah, Georgia":

... May the same wonder-working Deity, who long since delivering the Hebrews from their Egyptian Oppressors planted them in the promised land – whose providential agency has lately been conspicuous in establishing these United States as an independent nation – still continue to water them with the dews of heaven and to make the inhabitants of every denomination participate in the temporal and spiritual blessings of that people whose God is Jehovah.

=== First synagogue building site ===
Moses Sheftall and Jacob De la Motta led an effort in 1818 to construct a synagogue building on a plot of land given to the congregation by the city of Savannah. A small wooden building was erected at the northeast corner of Liberty and Whitaker streets and was consecrated on July 21, 1820, making it the first synagogue to be built in the State of Georgia. A fire destroyed the building on December 4, 1829, but the congregation saved its Torah scrolls.

Moses Sheftall led reconstruction efforts that began in 1834. A brick building was constructed on the same site and dedicated in 1841 at ceremonies led by Reverend Isaac Leeser of Philadelphia. A bronze plaque in the sidewalk today marks the site of these structures. Reverend Jacob Rosenfeld became the congregation's first permanent spiritual leader in 1853, serving in that role until 1862. For most of the succeeding years, the services were led by lay members of the congregation until they hired Reverend A. Harris in 1873.

=== Shift to Reform Judaism ===
Mickve Israel maintained its Portuguese traditions from its inception. It maintained this minhag in the face of the rising influence in the 19th century of Reform Judaism in the United States. It began to shift by adding a choir accompanied by musical instruments and eliminating observance of the second day of festivals starting on February 11, 1868. Rabbi Isaac P. Mendes recommended a gradual shift in changes in synagogue practice during his 27 years leading the congregation, which started in 1877. The requirement to use a chuppah at wedding ceremonies was eliminated in 1880, and the obligation to wear a head covering was removed in 1894.

The congregation used a modified Portuguese traditional siddur until 1895, when the synagogue published a prayer book of its own. In 1902, the congregation adopted the Union Prayer Book. Mickve Israel joined the Union of American Hebrew Congregations (Reform) on January 10, 1904. A vestige of the congregation's Sephardi tradition remains with the singing of "El Norah Alilah" during the Ne'ila service in the concluding hour of Yom Kippur.

=== Current building ===
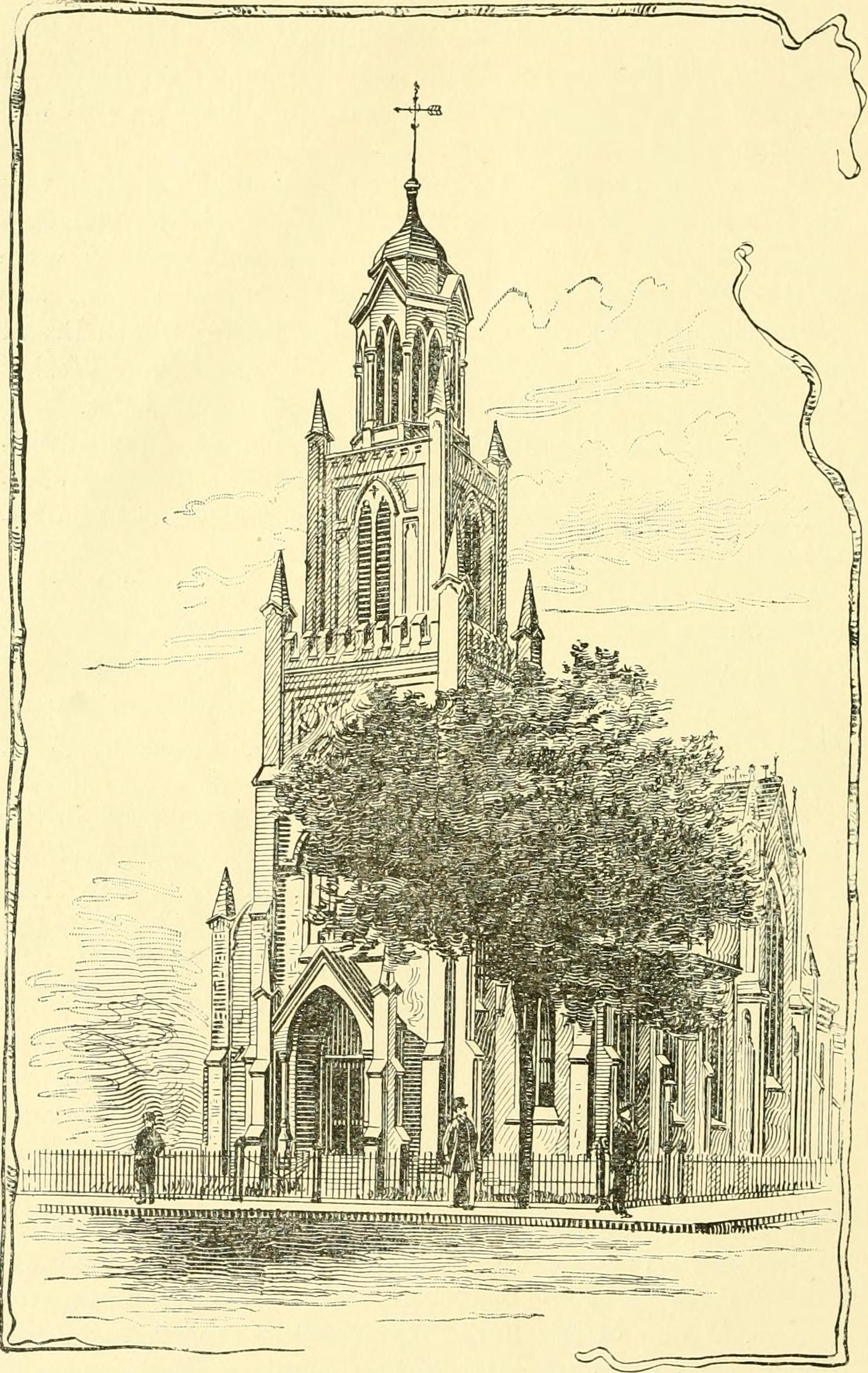
An 1890 illustration of the current, Gothic Revival building

With the growth in Savannah's Jewish population, the congregation outgrew its structure. It planned for a new building, laying the cornerstone for what its current structure on March 1, 1876. The building's Gothic Revival architecture (Note: Many texts describe the architecture as "Gothic", instead of "Gothic Revival". However, Curl contends that Gothic architecture ceased prior to the conclusion of the Early modern period. And Harrison's design of the Cathedral of the Incarnation (1871) is described as "Gothic Revival".) was the work of New York architect Henry G. Harrison, whose previous buildings included the Cathedral of the Incarnation in Garden City, New York. Harrison set out the synagogue in a typically Christian cruciform plan. In an unusual feature, the tower is topped with an open gazebo-shaped belvedere surmounted by an almost Islamic-inspired cupola. Not long after the building plans were confirmed, the synagogue president received a letter from a Pennsylvania woman commenting on the design of the synagogue, resembling Christian form:

You are the first Israelites I have ever heard of to build a church in the shape of a cross, the symbol of the Holy Trinity . . . the symbol of Him who is despised by so many of your people. . . . [W]hat a comfort to know you have taken this step to enter our fold. . . . Doubtless, you have had to overcome great perplexities before your people consented to have a church built so ultra-Christian in form.

— Mary M. Chisolm to President of the Israelite Church, April 8, 1876.

An unused portion of property adjoining the synagogue building, which had been dedicated by Mordecai Sheftall in 1773 for use as a cemetery, was sold. Another portion of the lot was used as the site of the Mordecai Sheftall Memorial in 1902, a building that included space for meeting rooms and a religious school.

A capacity crowd of Jews and prominent Christians attended a ceremony held at the congregation on May 7, 1933, to mark the 200th anniversary of the arrival of Jews in the colony of Georgia. The planned speaker at the event, Harold Hirsch of Atlanta, was unable to attend.

As the congregation found additional needs, the original Mordecai Sheftall Memorial space became too small. An expanded replacement structure was dedicated on January 11, 1957. Further modifications to the three-story Sheftall Memorial Hall addition were made in 2003, to house the congregation's museum, library, shop, religious school, offices, banquet room and kitchen.

== Tours ==
The synagogue is located in the Savannah Historic District and offers tours to visitors on weekdays except on Jewish and federal holidays, and St Patrick's Day. The tour lasts about forty-five minutes, with fee of $14 per person.

== Gallery ==
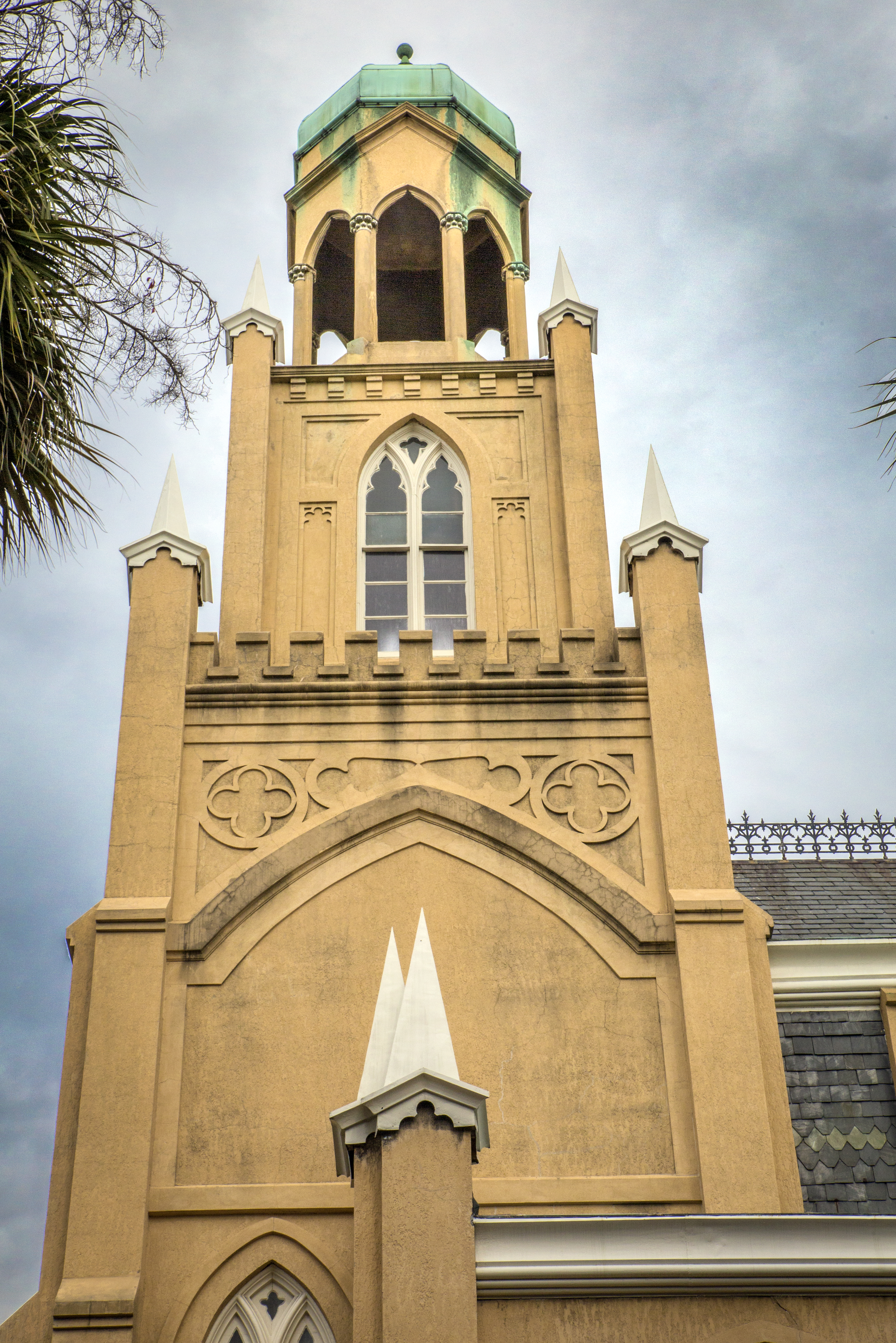
The central tower of the building

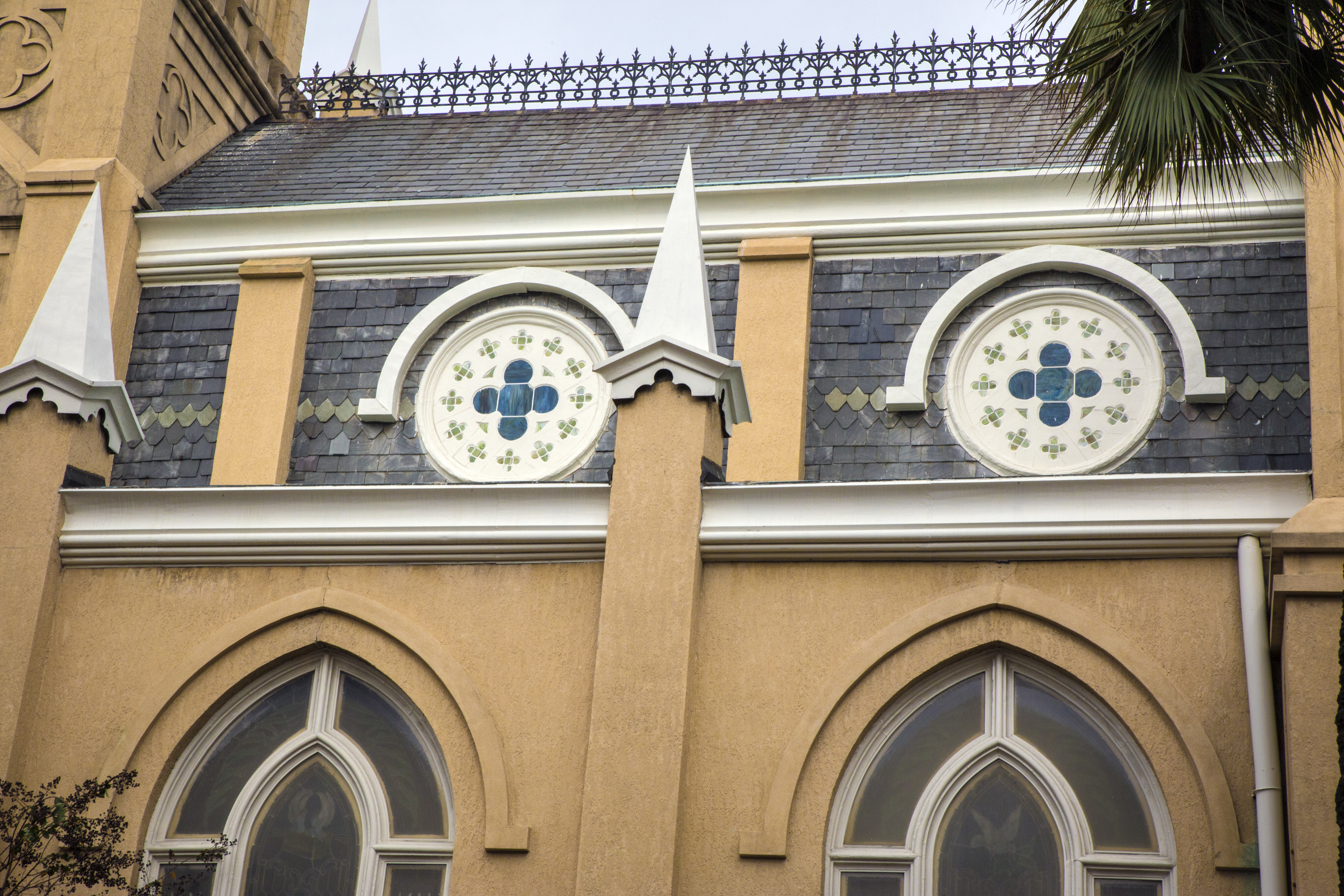
The building's northeast-facing facade

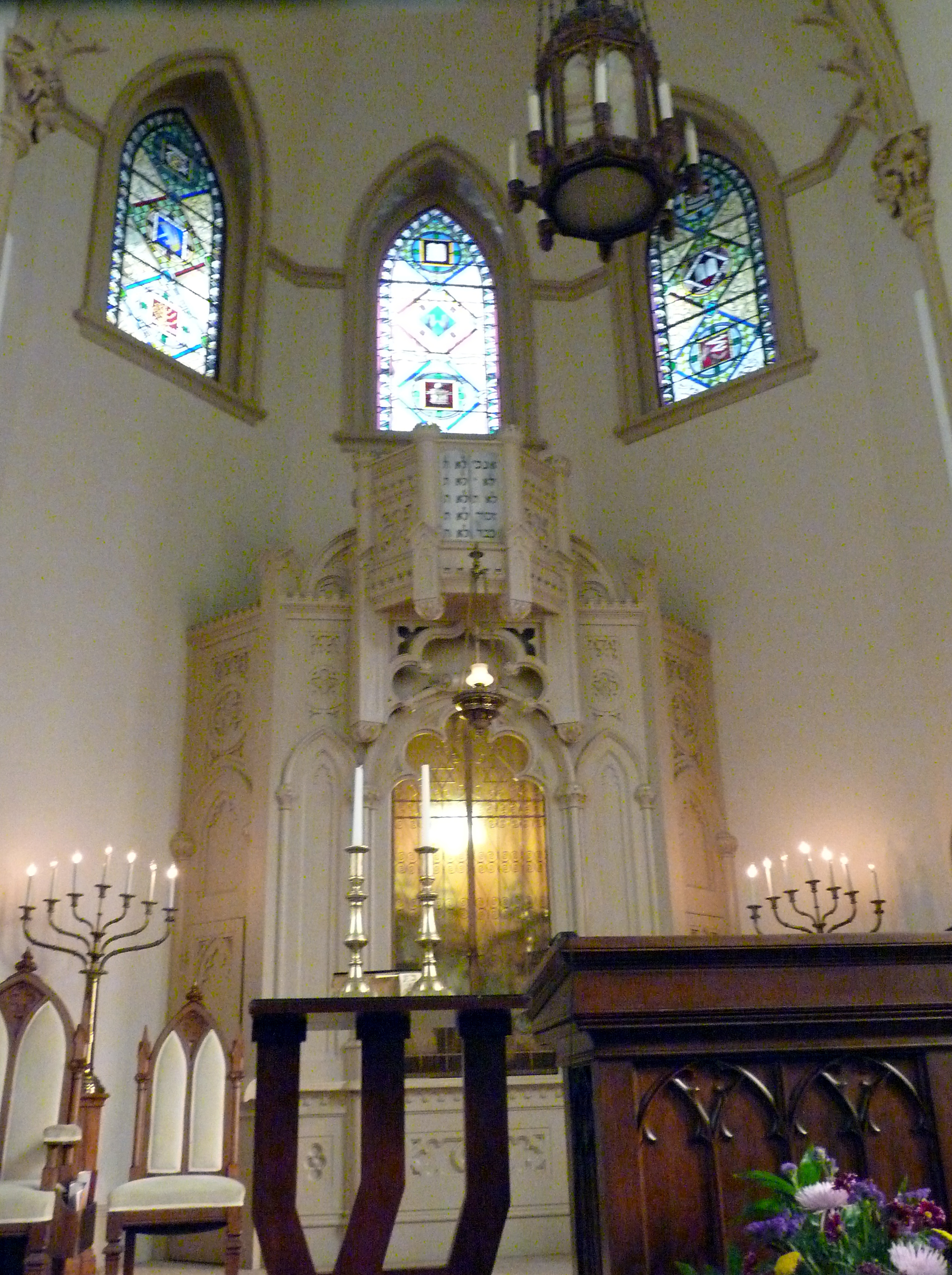
The bimah and ark at the front of the sanctuary

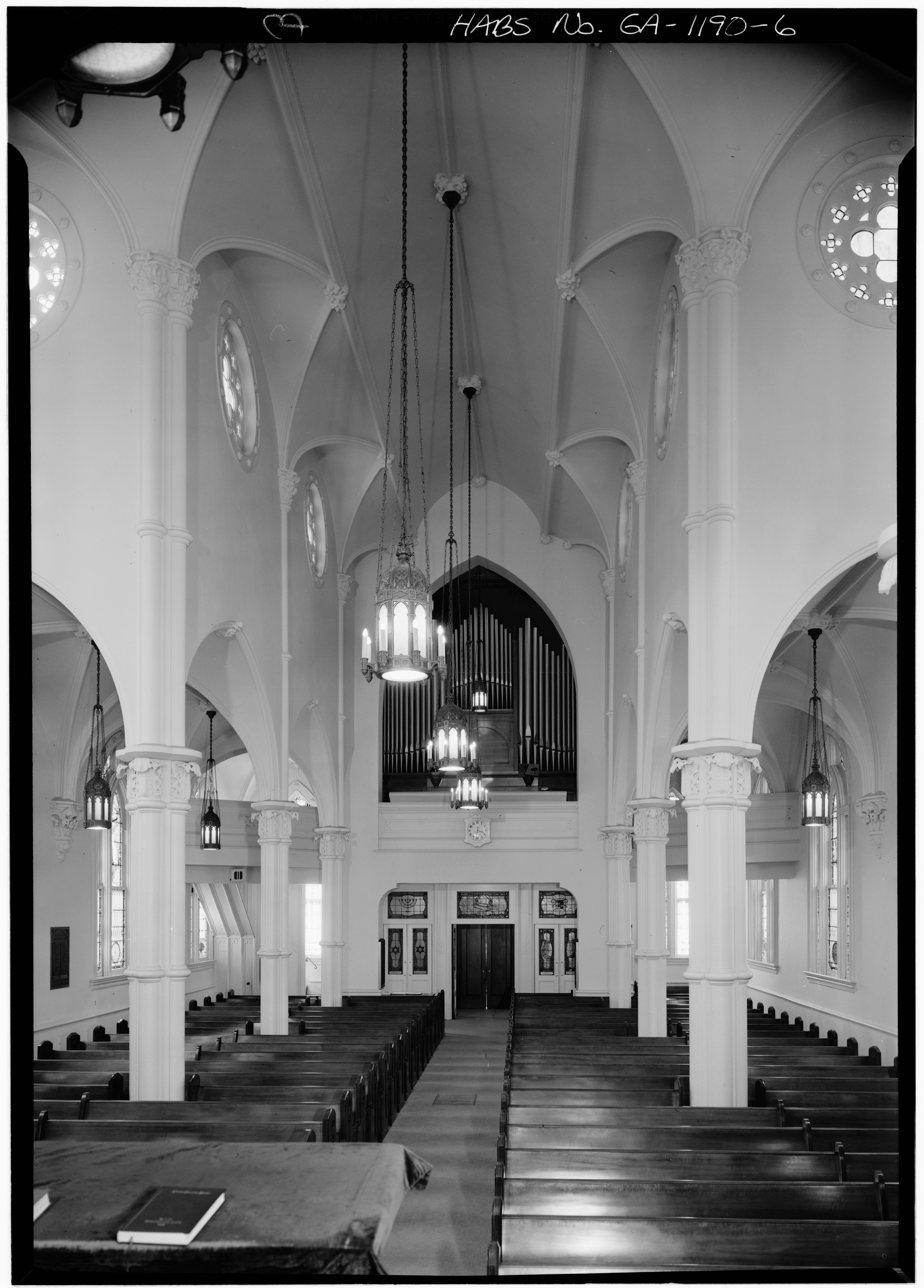
Interior of the sanctuary looking to the rear

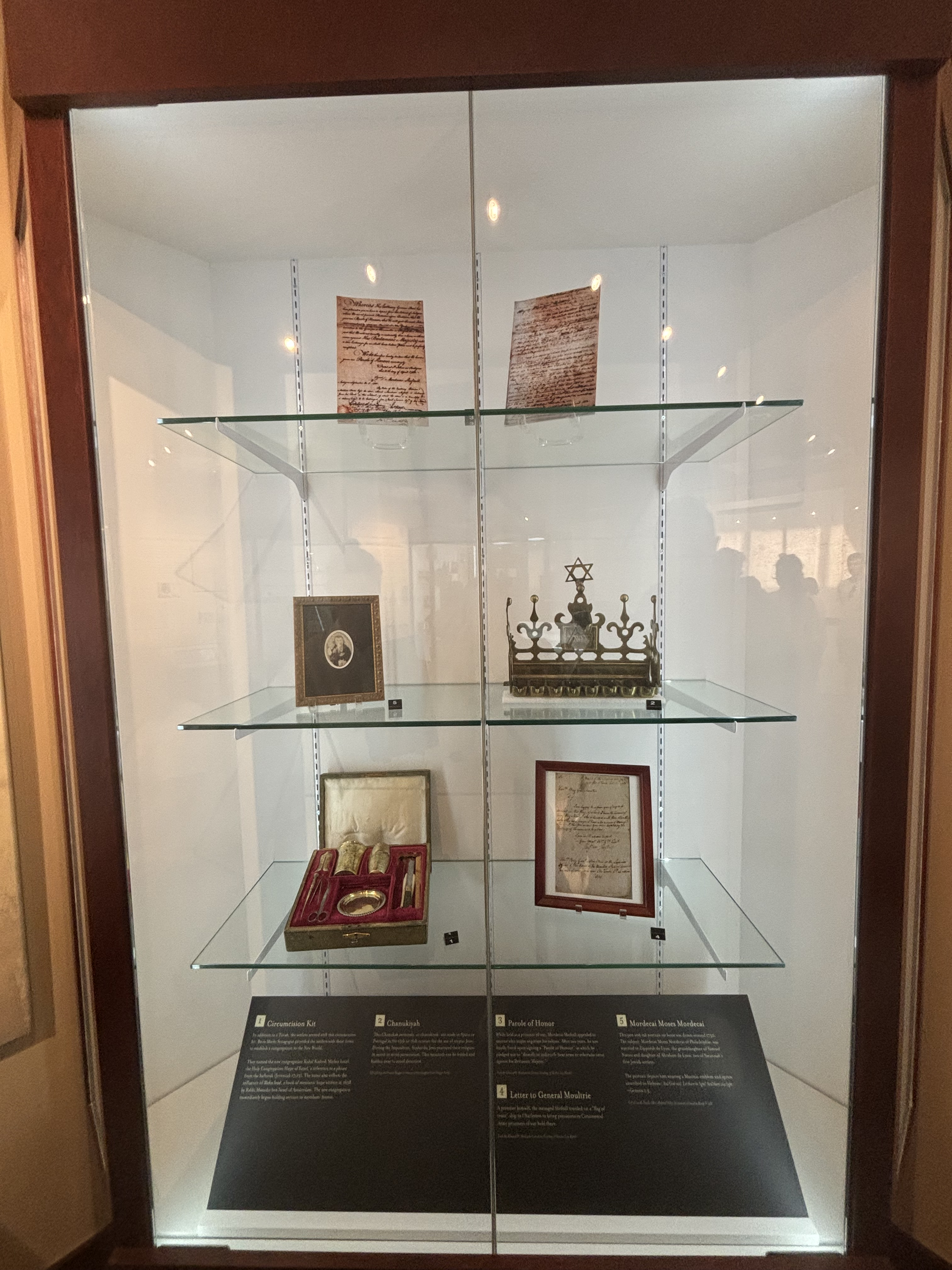
Artifacts/judaica displayed in the Jewish Museum component of Congregation Mickve Israel

== See also ==
- Jewish history in Colonial America
- Leopold Adler, former president of the congregation
- Moses Ferst, memorialized by a stained-glass window on the Wayne Street (northern) side of the sanctuary
- Simon Guckenheimer, former president of the congregation
