= Isaac P. Mendes =

Jamaican-American rabbi

Isaac Phillip Mendes (January 13, 1853 – June 28, 1904) was a Jamaican-American rabbi.

== Life ==
Mendes was born on January 13, 1853, in Kingston, Jamaica, the son of Joseph and Sarah Mendez.

Mendes was interested in becoming a rabbi from an early age and was sent to England to his uncle Rabbi Abraham Pereira Mendes. There, he was educated first at Northwick College and then by his uncle and other rabbis. He officiated at the Bevis Marks Synagogue in 1870, and later he preached at its branch synagogue when the regular Minister was absent. In 1873, he went to America and was named rabbi of Kahal Kadosh Beth Shalome in Richmond, Virginia.

In 1877, Mendes became rabbi of Congregation Mickve Israel in Savannah, Georgia. He then received an M.A. and D.D. from the University of Georgia. He wrote Pure Words, First Lessons in Hebrew, and a collection of special prayers. He served as rabbi in Mickve Israel until 1903, when he retired and became rabbi emeritus.

In 1877, Mendes married Grace S. De Castro. Their children were Dora S., Ziphrah, Alma, Joy, and Joseph H.

Mendes died at home from tuberculosis on June 28, 1904. His funeral was held at Mickve Israel. He was buried in Laurel Grove Cemetery.
