= Mordecai Sheftall =

Continental Army officer 1735–1797

Colonel Mordecai Sheftall
- Born: December 2, 1735; Savannah, Province of Georgia
- Died: July 6, 1797 (aged 61); Savannah, Georgia, U.S.
- Resting place: Mordecai Sheftall Cemetery, Savannah, Georgia, U.S.
- Occupations: Merchant, Inspector of Tanned Leather for the Port of Savannah
- Known for: Founding member of Congregation Mickve Israel, Highest ranking Jewish Revolutionary War officer
- Spouse: Frances Fannie (Freidel) Hart
- Relatives: Levi Sheftall (half brother)

Mordecai Sheftall (December 2, 1735 – July 6, 1797) was a merchant who served as a colonel in the Continental Army. He was from the Province of Georgia during the American Revolutionary War and was the highest ranking Jewish officer. He was born in Savannah, Province of Georgia, to Benjamin and Perla Sheftall, who had arrived in 1733 to the Georgia colony on the William and Sarah from London, England, with a few dozen members of other Jewish settler families. The Sheftalls were among the founding members of Congregation Mickve Israel.

== Biography ==
Mordecai was born on December 2, 1735, to Perla and Benjamin Sheftall. When he was three years old, his mother died. His father remarried within a year to Hannah Sheftall (née Solomons). His half-brother Levi was born in 1739, with another half-brother, Solomon, being born in 1741. However, he died in 1743, at just two years of age. Mordecai left school at the age of eleven, as there was a severe lack of schools, with his father continuing his Jewish education. Upon his bar mitzvah, he ordered tefillin and s'farim for his son from England. The order arrived slightly late, and his father became worried that the ship holding the tefillin and s'farim got lost at sea or was captured by an "enemy" vessel. England was in middle of King George's war at the time, so he was probably talking about the French when he referred to an "enemy." Sheftall went into business by the time he was seventeen, and was making a nice profit buying, tanning, and then selling deerskin. When he was eighteen, he had made enough money to purchase fifty acres of land near Savannah. By his mid twenties, he was doing business with companies from the Caribbean, Charleston, and Philadelphia, making substantial sums of money. In 1761, when he was twenty-six, Sheftall married Frances Fannie (Freidel) (née Hart, (1740–1820). Together, they had six children: Sheftall, Benjamin, Elias, Moses, Perla and Esther. Elias died as a baby. Not long after his marriage, Sheftall began to raise cattle and horses on a 2,000-acre farm with nine slaves. Also on the property was a tanning facility that he constructed with his half-brother Levi.

=== American Revolution ===
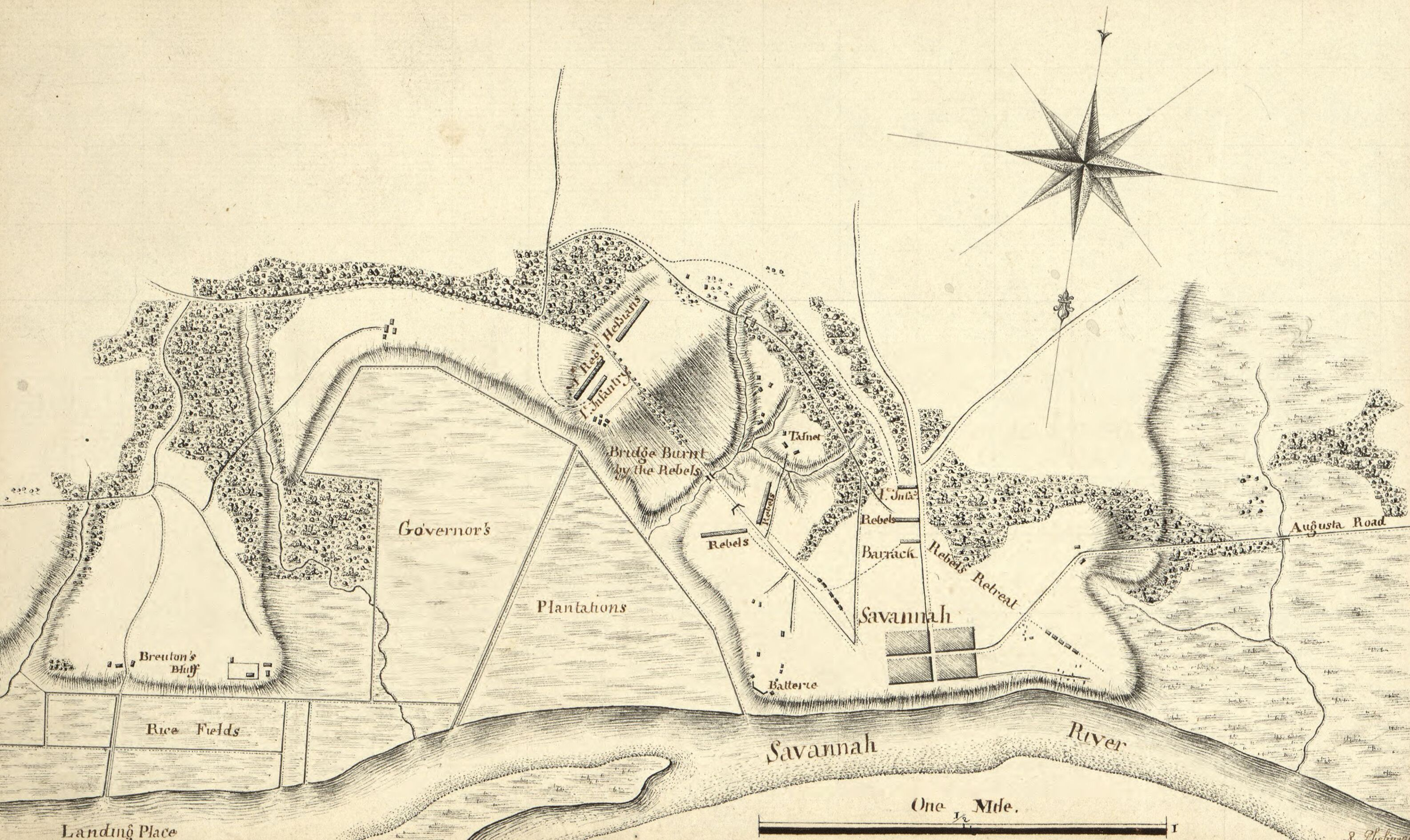
Map of the capture of Savannah, at which Sheftall was taken prsioner

From the early years of the American Revolution, Sheftall was a supporter of the Patriot cause, vocally opposing the passage of the Stamp Act 1765 by the Parliament of Great Britain. He became chairman of the Parochial Committee of Savannah, a Patriot organization which was organized as a local affiliate of the Sons of Liberty; his appointment has been taken by some to indicate the level of high standing Sheftall enjoyed among both Jews and non-Jews in Georgia. The American Revolutionary War broke out in 1775, and in 1777 Sheftall was appointed commissary general to the American troops in Georgia. In October 1778 he was appointed "Deputy Commissary of Issues in South Carolina and Georgia"; during this period Sheftall served as a staff officer in the Continental Army's Georgia Line.

Major General Robert Howe promoted Sheftall to colonel; the newly promoted officer appointed his son Sheftall as his aide-de-camp. Sheftall took part in the unsuccessful defense of Savannah on December 29, 1778, where he and his son were taken prisoner by the British. Due to refusing to renounce their loyalty to the Patriot cause, Sheftall and his son were imprisoned onboard the prison ship Nancy. Onboard Nancy, Sheftall refused to eat the pork given to him in keeping with kosher dietary restrictions. To taunt him, his guards allegedly smeared his cutlery in pork grease, knowing he would refuse to use it. While Sheftall was imprisoned on Nancy, another prisoner jumped overboard in an attempt to escape. The man drowned, and his body was brought back on the ship; Sheftall offered to pay almost all the money he had to have the man buried. On February 25, 1779, Sheftall was told he would be released, but he was only released in June. However, on his way north, he was captured again and sent to the British colony of Antigua. Sheftall, however, negotiated a prisoner exchange, and was released in April 1780.

Due to the British occupation of Savannah, Sheftall and his son traveled to New York City before moving to Philadelphia. The British had confiscated his property during their occupation of Savannah, and his loans that he gave for the defense of Georgia were never paid back. However, he opened a shipping business from Philadelphia, and tried his hand at privateering, in 1781. The latter failed, but he was called back to Georgia the same year, to Agent for the State of Georgia for Purchasing Clothing. In 1782, he was a witness at the court-martial of Robert Howe, where it was being decided if he was at fault for failing to defend Savannah, back in 1779. With the British evacuating Savannah on July 11, that same year, Sheftall returned to his Savannah and his family.

== Religious life ==
Sheftall was an observant Jew. For several years, the only Jewish place of worship in Savannah was a room fitted up by him in his own house, where services were held until about 1774. In 1773, he deeded a piece of land for the purpose of erecting a synagogue, but the project was abandoned owing to the incipient war with Great Britain. He and his brother Levi also donated the land for the Savannah Jewish cemetery, which was known for decades as the "Sheftall cemetery." In 1782, in Philadelphia, Sheftall helped build the synagogue for the Congregation Mikveh Israel. In 1790, Sheftall became president of Congregation Mickve Israel, a position he held for five years.

== Death ==
Sheftall died on July 6, 1797.
