= Burghaslach =

- Municipality
- Coat of arms

- Location of Burghaslach within Neustadt a.d.Aisch-Bad Windsheim district
- Interactive map of Burghaslach
- Location within Germany Location within Bavaria
- Coordinates: 49°43′N 10°35′E
- Country: Germany
- State: Bavaria
- Admin. region: Mittelfranken
- District: Neustadt a.d.Aisch-Bad Windsheim
- Subdivisions: 13 districts

Government
  - Mayor (2020–26): Armin Luther

Area
  - Total: 44.02 km^{2} (17.00 sq mi)
- Elevation: 296 m (971 ft)

Population (2025-12-31)
  - Total: 2,738
  - Density: 62.20/km^{2} (161.1/sq mi)
- Time zone: UTC+01:00 (CET)
  - Summer (DST): UTC+02:00 (CEST)
- Postal codes: 96152
- Dialling codes: 09552
- Vehicle registration: NEA
- Website: www.burghaslach.de

Burghaslach is a municipality and a market town in the district of Neustadt (Aisch)-Bad Windsheim in Franconia in Bavaria, Germany.

== Geography ==
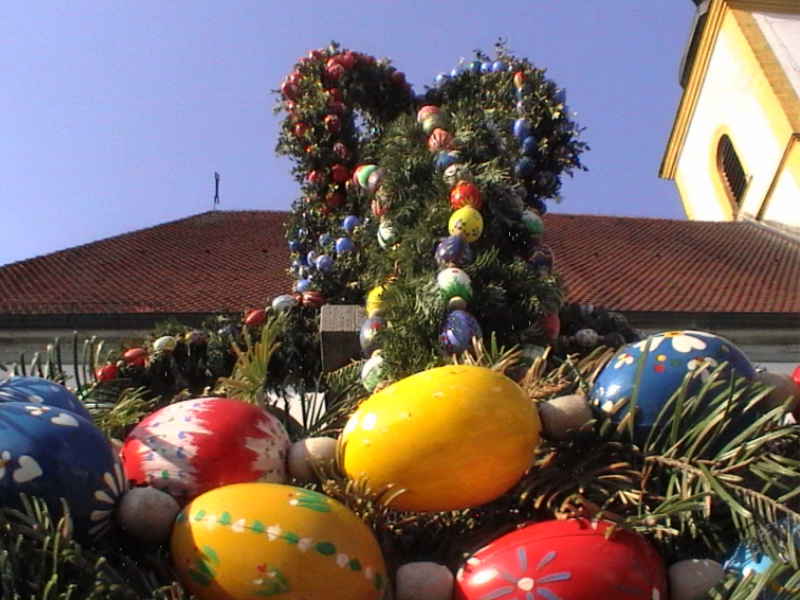
Easter-decorated market fountain of Burghaslach, in the background St. Ägidius's Church

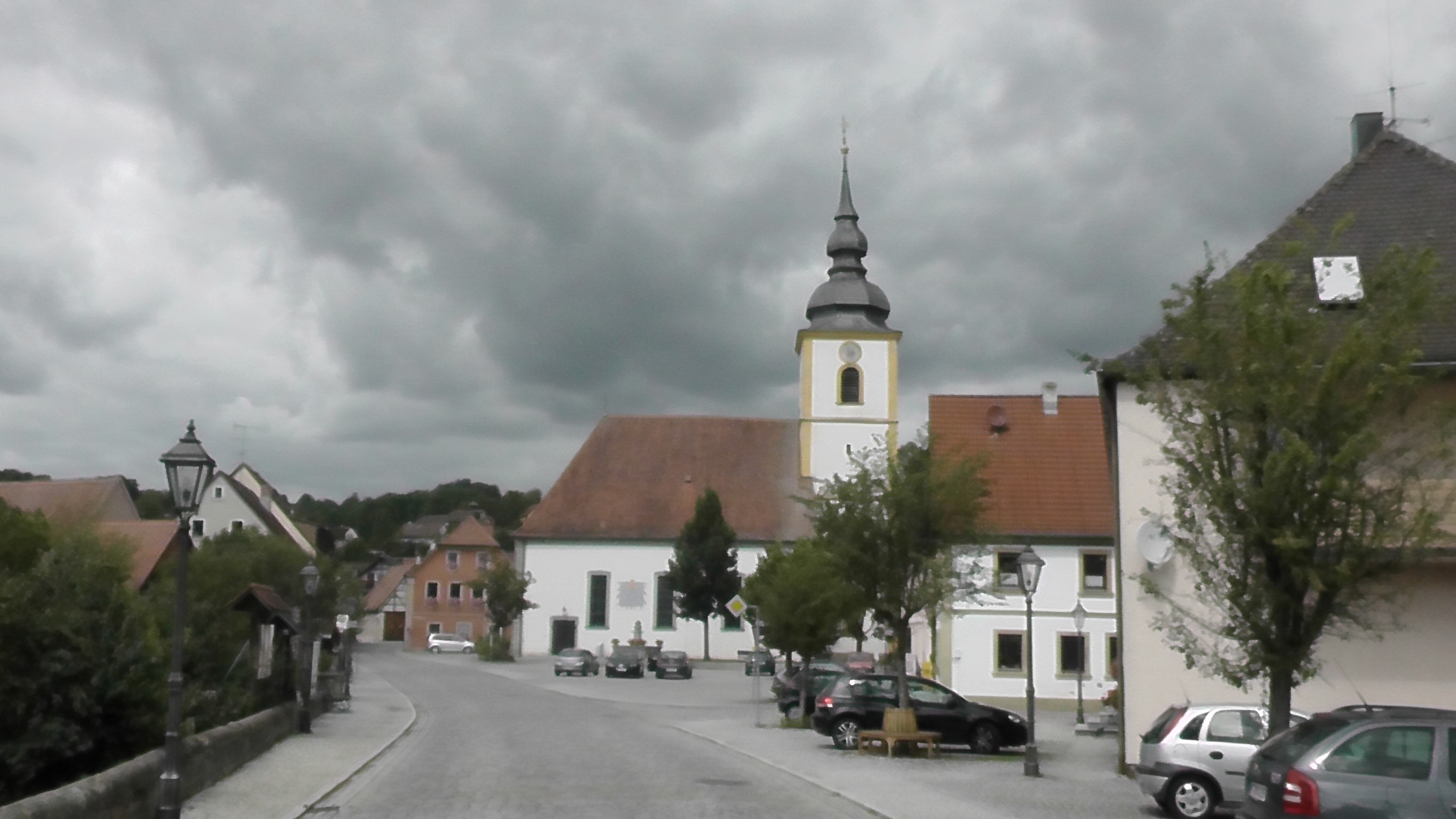
Burghaslach's marketplace on which stands the St Ägidius's Church

Neighbouring municipalities to Burghaslach are Geiselwind, Schlüsselfeld, Vestenbergsgreuth, Markt Taschendorf, Scheinfeld, and Oberscheinfeld.

=== Geographical Location ===
Burghaslach is between Würzburg and Nürnberg. It is accessible by slip road 77 of the Bundesautobahn 3.

=== Districts ===
The municipality is composed of 16 districts:

- Breitenlohe
- Buchbach
- Buchmühle
- Burghaslach
- Burghöchstadt
- Freihaslach
- Fürstenforst
- Gleißenberg
- Hardhof
- Kirchrimbach
- Münchhof
- Niederndorf
- Oberrimbach
- Rosenbirkach
- Seitenbuch
- Unterrimbach

== Placename ==
The name Burghaslach is derived from the German Burg what means castle and Haslach, a local river.

== History ==
Burghaslach was independent from 1136.

In 1806, Burghaslach became a part of the Kingdom of Bavaria.

== Politic ==
The mayor of Burghaslach is Armin Luther, in office since 2014 and re-elected in 2020.

=== Council ===
The membership of the council is distributed as follows:

| | CSU/Free voters community | SPD/Free voters | Wählergemeinschaft Gleißenberg | Freie Gemeindeliste | GRÜNE | Total |
| 2002 | 5 | 3 | 1 | 5 | - | 14 seats |
| 2008 | 6 | 3 | 1 | 4 | - | 14 seats |

== Economy and infrastructure ==
=== Traffic ===
The market is near the Bundesautobahn 3 Würzburg - Nürnberg slip road 77 Schlüsselfeld.

The ADAC declared the truck stop at Burghaslach as the winner of the 2008 European Service Area Competition. The truck stop was rated "very good" in five of nine categories. Among a total of 65 checked service areas in Germany, Austria, Italy, France and Switzerland the truck stop at Burghaslach came in first.

== Notable people ==
- Simon Guckenheimer (1830–1900), merchant
