= Lee Adler (preservationist) =

American preservationist

- Adler c. 2000
- Born: Leopold Adler II; April 18, 1923; Savannah, Georgia, U.S.
- Died: January 29, 2012 (aged 88); Skidaway Island, Georgia, U.S.
- Resting place: Bonaventure Cemetery, Savannah, Georgia, U.S.
- Occupation: Historic preservationist
- Spouse: Emma Morel (1953–2012; his death)
- Children: 2

Leopold Adler II (April 18, 1923 – January 29, 2012) was an American historic preservationist based in Savannah, Georgia. President of the Historic Savannah Foundation, he was instrumental in the preservation movement in that city.

He appeared in John Berendt's best-selling 1994 book Midnight in the Garden of Good and Evil.

== Life and career ==
Adler was born in 1923 in Savannah, Georgia, to Samuel Guckenheim Adler Sr. and Elinor Grunsfeld. His grandfather, after whom he was named, was Austrian native Leopold I. He established Adler's department store, on Broughton Street, in 1878. It burned down in 1958.

He attended Savannah's Pape School, before graduating from Deerfield Academy in Massachusetts in 1942. Later that year, Adler enlisted in the United States Navy Air Corps.

After World War II, he studied at Brown University. He completed his degree at the University of Georgia in Athens, Georgia, in 1950.

Adler married Emma Morel, daughter of John Morel and Emma Walthour, on September 12, 1953, with whom he had two children: John Morel and Leopold III. Lee's mother, Elinor, was one of the seven founders of the Historic Savannah Foundation, which Emma later became a member of. Lee became its president in 1961 and served six terms. He wrote a handbook on preservation in 1974.

In 1959, after learning that four century-old Savannah town houses were about to become demolished, he made a deal to purchase the entire row for $54,000, with the 300 members of the Foundation agreeing to share the cost.

Adler's preservation skills were taken nationally when he joined a coalition of preservationists (Arthur Zeigler, J. Reid Williamson, St. Clair Wright) to strengthen Preservation Action to protect and enhance preservation efforts at the federal level. Additionally, he shared his knowledge, got involved in issues, and directed multiple preservation efforts through the Savannah Landmark Rehabilitation Project, his non-profit service to the National Trust for Historic Preservation.

Adler's father died in 1979, and his mother later remarried, to William Elber Dillard, whom she also survived. Dillard died in 1991, aged 92, and Elinor followed less than a year later, although she was buried beside her first husband in Savannah's Bonaventure Cemetery.

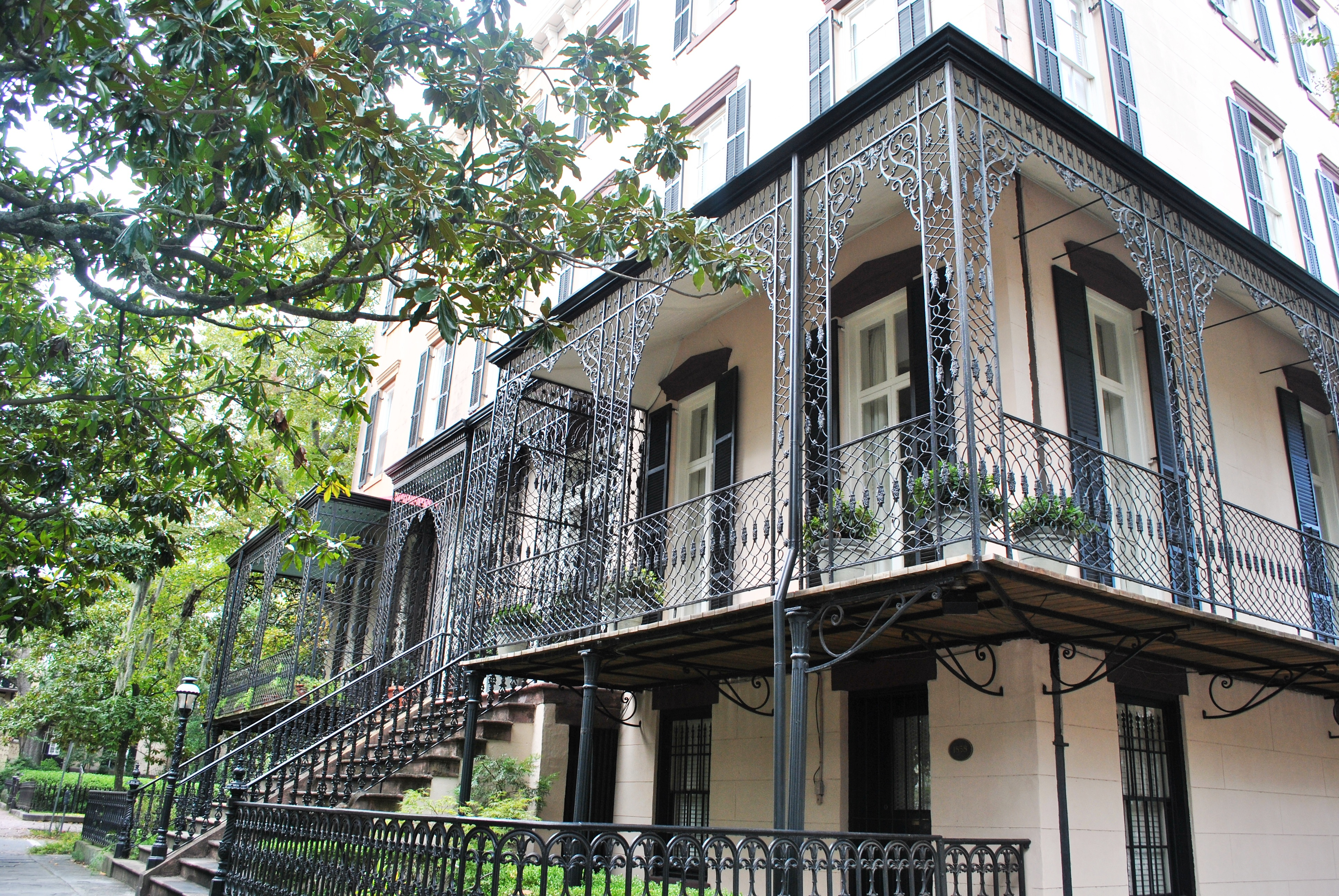
The former Adler home at 425 Bull Street in Savannah, built in 1858

In 1989, U.S. president George H. W. Bush presented Adler with the National Medal of Arts for "civic leadership in preserving for all time the beauty of Savannah."

In 1994, Adler rose to fame after his appearance in the John Berendt non-fiction novel Midnight in the Garden of Good and Evil, which highlighted his sour relationship with its central character Jim Williams, a fellow Savannah preservationist. Having lived in Ardsley Park when they were first married, the Adlers later moved to 425 Bull Street, part of the Charles Rogers Duplex, located across West Wayne Street from the Mercer House home of Williams, on the western side of Monterey Square. (Adler's name was changed to Lorne Atwell in the Clint Eastwood-directed 1997 screenplay.) Adler once refused to shake Berendt's hand in front of a reporter. According to Berendt, Adler later apologized.

The Adlers won the John Macpherson Berrien Award for Lifetime Achievement from the Georgia Historical Society in 2003.

== Death ==
Adler died in 2012 in Skidaway Island, Georgia. He was 88. He is interred in Bonaventure Cemetery, alongside his wife, who survived him by eight years. She was 90 years old.

After his death, the Historic Savannah Foundation established the Lee and Emma Adler Preservation Advocacy Award.
