= Levi Sheftall =

Jewish settler of Georgia, U.S. (1739–1809

- Born: December 12, 1739; Savannah, Province of Georgia
- Died: January 20, 1809 (aged 69); Savannah, Georgia
- Resting place: Levi Sheftall Cemetery, Savannah, Georgia
- Spouse: Sarah de la Motta (m. 1768–1809; his death)
- Relatives: Mordecai Sheftall (half brother)

Levi Sheftall (December 12, 1739 – January 20, 1809) was a Jewish merchant in colonial Savannah, Georgia. He served in the American Revolutionary War.

== Early life ==
Sheftall was born in 1739 in Savannah, Province of Georgia, to Benjamin Sheftall and Hannah Solomons. He was their first of two children; a brother, Solomon, followed two years later. He had a half brother, Mordecai, from his father's first marriage, to Perla, who died in 1736.

== Career ==
In 1790, Sheftall gave the first congratulations from the Jewish community to George Washington after his election as the first U.S. president. Washington replied to Sheftall's letter.

Sheftall served in the Continental Army during the American Revolutionary War, and also as advisor to Charles Henri Hector, Count of Estaing, on the 1779 attack on Savannah by British troops.

== Personal life ==
In 1768, Sheftall married a 14-year-old Sarah de la Motta, with whom he had six known children between 1769 and 1796: Sarah, Benjamin, Perla, Solomon, Abraham and Abigail. The family lived in a "spacious two-story house" in Savannah's St James Square.

== Death ==
Sheftall died in 1809, aged 69. He was interred in the Levi Sheftall Cemetery. His widow survived him by two years and was buried beside him.
