= James C. Saltus =

American carpenter

- Born: c. 1837; South Carolina
- Died: June 13, 1883 (aged 45–46)
- Occupation: Carpenter
- Notable work: City Market, Savannah, Georgia

James C. Saltus (c. 1837 – June 13, 1883) was an American carpenter, active in the 19th century. One of his notable works was the third incarnation of the City Market building in Savannah, Georgia, which stood from 1876 to 1954.

In the American Civil War, Saltus, then living at 25 Mazyck Street in Charleston, South Carolina, served as a lieutenant with the Confederate Navy. At one stage, he was commanding in the absence of Captain W. Dove Walter. He was captured in a fight on June 18, 1864.

He was a partner in Walker & Saltus sash and blind manufacturers, located on the west side of Logan Street in ward 4. In 1882, Saltus' workshop was on Montgomery Street in Savannah, at the southwest corner with Liberty Street.

Saltus died in 1883, aged 45 or 46. He is interred in Savannah's Laurel Grove Cemetery.
