= Great Savannah Fire of 1820 =

1820 fire in Georgia, United States

- Date: January 11, 1820
- Location: Savannah, Georgia, United States
- Type: Conflagration
- Property damage: Approximately $4 million (equivalent to $92 million in 2025)

On January 11, 1820, a conflagration affected the city of Savannah, Georgia, United States, burning down almost 500 buildings and causing roughly $4 million (equivalent to $92 million in 2025) in damages. It was the most severe fire in the city's history and one of the most damaging in the country at that time.

The city had experienced several severe fires in the preceding century, and by the late 1810s, the city had at least half a dozen hand-powered fire engines. The fire had started at about 2 a.m. at a livery stable near Franklin Square and spread to City Market on Ellis Square, helped by both the high winds and the lack of rain that the city had experienced over the preceding months. By the time the fire died, almost the entire section of the city bounded by Abercorn, Bay, Broughton, and Jefferson Street had been destroyed, with the exception of a few buildings, including Christ Church.

Following this, donations from across the country flooded into Savannah, including a significant amount from municipalities in the Northern United States. A donation of over $10,000 ($230,000 in 2025) from New York City was turned down over a stipulation that provided the money be distributed without regard for race. While the damaged part of the city was largely rebuilt within a few years, the fire, alongside the Panic of 1819 and a yellow fever epidemic later that year, caused a period of stagnation for Savannah, as its exports fell precipitously and its population increased at a slow pace. The fire also placed African Americans in the city under heightened scrutiny, with Thomas U. P. Charlton, Savannah's mayor, directing fire patrols to arrest vagrant African Americans.

== Background ==
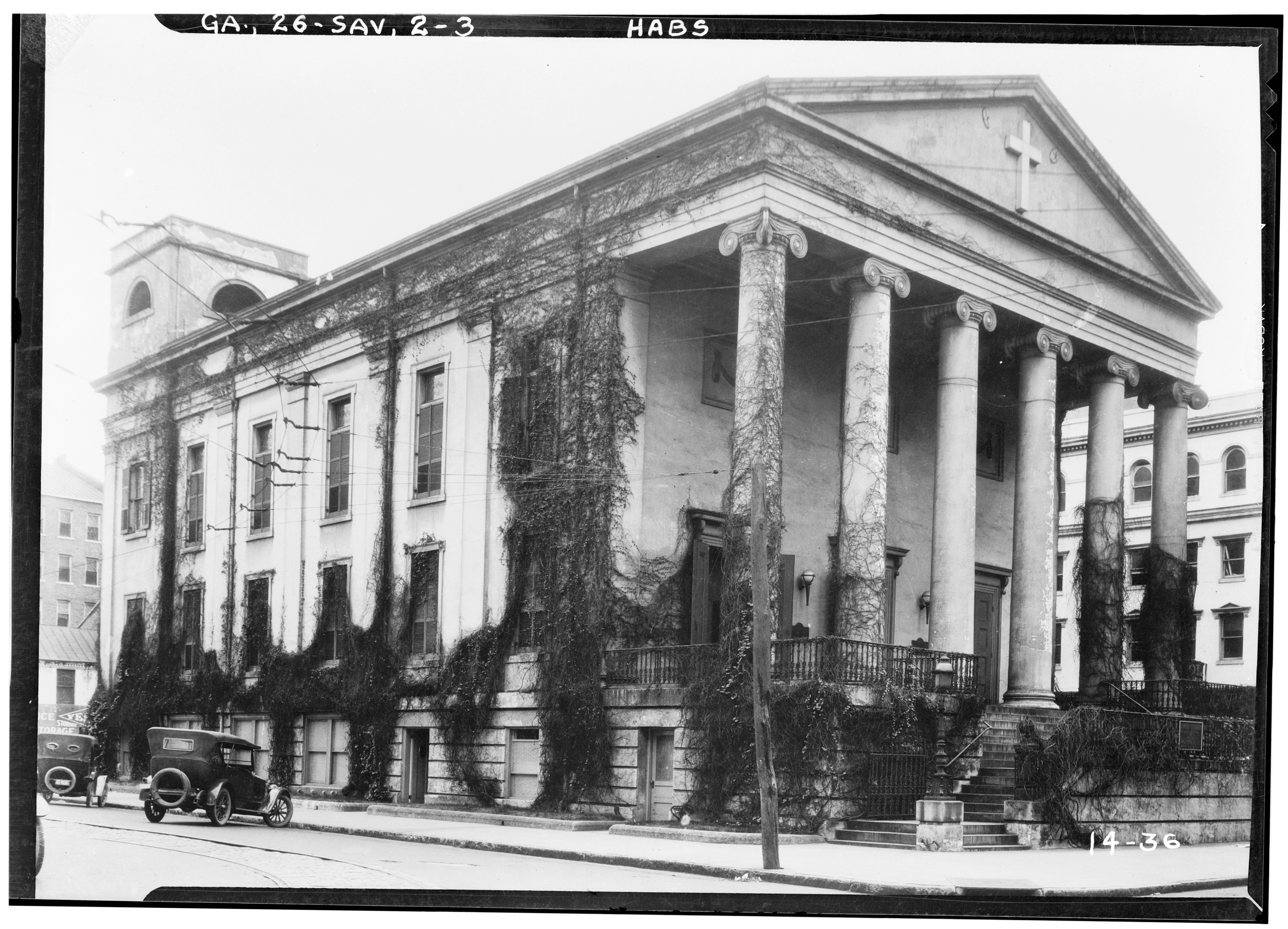
The city's Christ Church, having been completed just fourteen years earlier, survived the fire and became an important meeting point.

Throughout its history, the city of Savannah, Georgia, has experienced several major fires, the first of which occurred in 1737, just four years after the city was established. Additional fires occurred in 1741 and 1758. Following the latter, the Georgia General Assembly passed a law addressing fire safety in Savannah that banned wooden chimneys, required Savannah residents to own a ladder to assist in firefighting, and required a 15-person unit to be maintained to operate the city's fire engine as needed. At the time, firefighting activities in the city were overseen by the officials at Christ Church. Additional legislation from the city council banned the boiling of pitch, tar, and turpentine within city limits. Despite this, another fire occurred in 1796 that destroyed over 300 homes, about two-thirds of all those in the city, and was considered one of the worst in the United States's history at that point. However, this fire was the last in the city for the next 24 years. In the early 19th century, fears of another major fire coincided with Savannah's growth as a major lumber-exporting port city, and in 1818, a plot by some arsonists to burn a lumber yard was discovered, prompting an increase in fire patrolling. At the time, the city, with a population of about 7,000, had at least six hand-powered fire engines and several bucket brigades.

== The fire ==
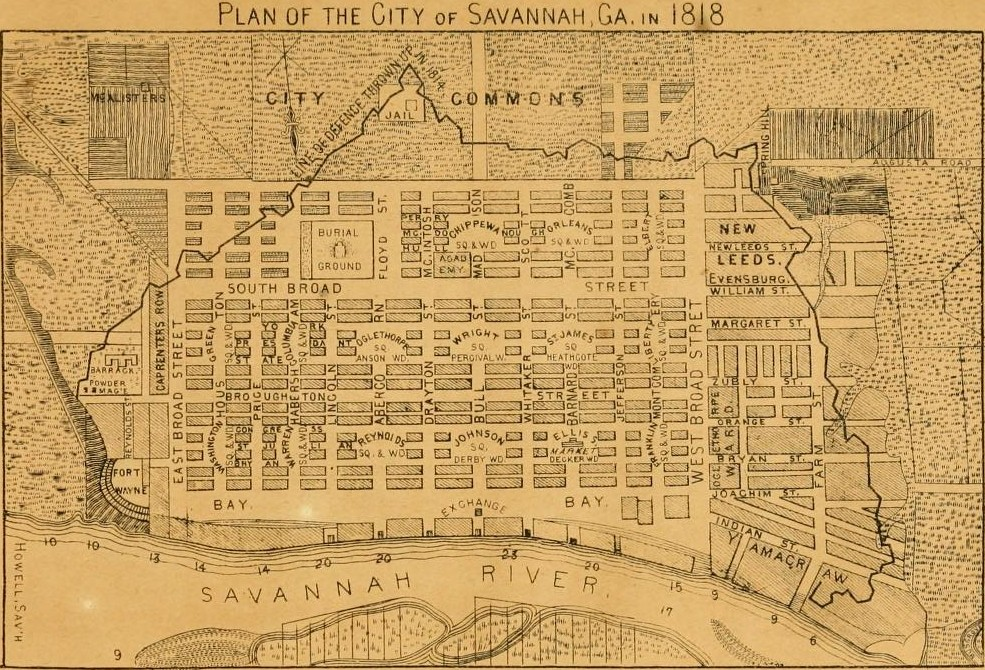
A map of Savannah, Georgia, in 1818

On January 11, 1820, at about 2 a.m., (Note: Sources vary slightly on when exactly the fire started, with given times including between 1:00 and 2:00, 2:00, and 2:30.) a fire broke out in a livery stable located behind a boarding house on Franklin Square. The fire spread to Franklin Square, through the most densely populated part of the city, before turning and moving down Bay Street towards Barnard Street. Due to strong northwesterly winds, the fire spread quickly, and as it had been several months since Savannah experienced significant rainfall, many of the wooden structures in the city were quickly engulfed by flames. This included several lumber yards. When the fire reached City Market on Ellis Square, the fire triggered two explosions from illegally stored gunpowder. This hampered firefighting efforts and caused further destruction. In total, the conflagration lasted about eight hours, not being fully extinguished until about 2 p.m.

The fire was the worst fire in the city's history, surpassing the destruction of the 1796 event, and was among the worst in U.S. history. The blaze destroyed much of the city, primarily centered on the central business district. This included the area bounded by Bay Street and Broughton Street on either side and stretching from Jefferson Street to Abercorn Street. 94 land lots were affected, destroying 463 buildings, including City Market. With the exception of two banks, Christ Church, and about three or four other brick buildings, this accounted for every building in the affected area. Only one retail store and one wholesale store were left in the city. Total property damage from the fire was estimated at $4 million (equivalent to $92 million in 2025), though possibly as high as $5 million ($115 million in 2025). The fire affected at least two-thirds of the city's entire population, and hundreds of individuals were left homeless. Additionally, in the days that followed, looting was rampant. Four days after the fire, the rector for Christ Church wrote, "today I preached the Funeral Sermon of Savannah". The Savannah Theatre, while not directly damaged by the fire, decided to close for the season.

== Aftermath ==
In the days that followed, a local baker and members of the planter class provided free food for those who had been displaced by the fire. Savannah City Council appropriated $1,000 ($20,000 in 2025) for relief efforts, and both the council and Thomas U. P. Charlton, the mayor of Savannah, petitioned outside groups for more financial assistance. Charlton sent letters to judges and city governments across the state urging assistance. Georgia Governor John Clark gave the city $10,000 ($230,000 in 2025) from a governor's contingent fund, though the state legislature, which was not in session at the time, did not allocate any more funds. About $35,000 ($810,000 in 2025) were collected from across the state, with private donations amounting to about $6,600 ($150,000 in 2025). Within five months of the fire, a local women's benefit society was able to raise several hundred dollars, mostly through donations collected at the city's churches, to assist those in need. Additional donations came from other states, including $10,000 from the city of Charleston, South Carolina, and several thousand dollars from Boston and Philadelphia. In total, the city accepted roughly $99,000 ($2.28 million in 2025) in outside donations.

In New York City, donations resulted in about $12,000 ($280,000 in 2025) being raised for Savannah. (Note: Sources vary on the exact amount sent from New York City to Savannah, with different values of $10,238.29, "more than $12,000 and merchandise", and $12,519.38.) However, the donation caused controversy, as it was sent with a letter stipulating that the funds be allocated "without distinction of color". In the context of the then-ongoing debates regarding slavery in the United States and the Missouri Compromise in particular, the provision was viewed by the city council as a slight against the city, which was located in a slave state in the Southern United States. Mayor Charlton returned the donations to New York City, stating with regards to the provision, "injustice has been done our citizens". The controversy highlighted sectional divides within the country and led to a decline in donations from municipalities in the Northern United States.

Within four months of the fire, reconstruction efforts had been underway, with Mayor Charlton commenting, "the ruins are rapidly disappearing". By the following year, City Market had been rebuilt. Many of the rebuilt buildings were constructed of wood, though other building materials were also employed. Within a few years of the fire, many of the former wooden buildings had been replaced with those of brick and stone.

== Impact ==
Historian E. Merton Coulter, writing about the fire in 1939, stated that the city developed a "fire hysteria" following the disaster that led to, among other things, a heightened concern over fire safety and regular fire patrols in the city and its suburbs. In 1821, 75 free Blacks assembled two fire companies, the Franklin Fire Engine and Hose Company and the Union Axe and Fire Company. The city soon passed an ordinance making it mandatory for all free black people between the ages of 16 and 60 to enlist with these companies. Additionally, male slaves were required to join these companies, for which they were compensated, and had to participate in monthly drills. In 1824, the General Assembly passed a law exempting firefighters in Savannah from mandatory militia or jury duties. By the late 1820s, the city's fire department was staffed by 178 slaves, 96 free Blacks, and 17 white Americans, who were part of the white-only Oglethorpe Company. Additionally, new equipment was purchased. Additionally, the city passed an ordinance awarding the first two people who rang a fire bell during times of disaster a financial reward.

The destructive fire, coming shortly after the Panic of 1819, signaled an end to the economic boom that the city had experienced after the end of the War of 1812. Additionally, the burned out buildings and exposed cellars accumulated stagnant water and provided a fertile breeding ground for yellow fever mosquitoes, leading to a severe yellow fever epidemic in the city later that year. The epidemic killed several hundred people, before colder winter weather killed the mosquitoes. Exports from the port decreased to about half of what they had been only a few years prior, while the city through the 1820s saw a growth in population of only about 4 percent. Crime rates remained high throughout the decade, and piracy was more common.

An official cause for the fire was never established. According to Coulter, there were rumors that the fire had been the work of arsonists from Spanish Florida, though he calls these claims "unfounded". However, in the aftermath of the fire, African Americans were placed under heightened scrutiny, with the mayor ordering fire patrols to arrest all vagrants and especially "black boys and those of colour". This scrutiny was apparent on a national level. The Lancaster Intelligencer and Weekly Advertiser of Lancaster, Pennsylvania published reports of the fire, suggesting a connection between it and a series of local fires that had occurred after a growth in Lancaster's free Black population.

== See also ==
- History of Savannah, Georgia
- List of town and city fires
- Timeline of Savannah, Georgia

== Sources ==
- Coulter, E. Merton (March 1939). "The Great Savannah Fire of 1820". The Georgia Historical Quarterly. XXIII (1). Georgia Historical Society: 1–27. ISSN 2169-852X. JSTOR 40576606. OCLC 565102618.
- Daiss, Timothy (2002). Rebels, Saints, and Sinners: Savannah's Rich History and Colorful Personalities. Gretna, Louisiana: Pelican Publishing. ISBN 1-58980-049-4. OCLC 49493485.
- Denmark, Lisa L. (2019). Savannah's Midnight Hour: Boosterism, Growth, and Commerce in a Nineteenth-Century American City. Athens, Georgia: University of Georgia Press. ISBN 978-0-8203-5633-4. OCLC 1120908506.
- Fraser, Walter J. Jr. (2005) [2003]. Savannah in the Old South (Paperback ed.). Athens, Georgia: University of Georgia Press. ISBN 978-0-8203-2776-1. OCLC 62073140.
- Lee, F. D.; Agnew, J. L. (1869). Historical Record of the City of Savannah. Savannah, Georgia: J. H. Estill. OCLC 1361176222.
- Lockley, Timothy J. (2016) [2013]. "Religion and the Rise and Fall of Female Benevolence in Antebellum Savannah, 1801–60". In Clark, Emily; Laven, Mary (eds.). Women and Religion in the Atlantic Age, 1550–1900. Milton Park: Routledge. pp. 195–212. ISBN 9781315546865. OCLC 7390582780.
- Mason, Matthew (Winter 2008). ""The Fire-Brand of Discord": The North, the South, and the Savannah Fire of 1820". The Georgia Historical Quarterly. XCII (4). Georgia Historical Society: 443–459. ISSN 2169-852X. JSTOR 40585086. OCLC 565102618.
- Slaughter, Thomas P. (1994) [1991]. Bloody Dawn: The Christiana Riot and Racial Violence in the Antebellum North (1st Paperback ed.). Oxford: Oxford University Press. ISBN 978-0-19-802151-3. OCLC 476006436.
- Sydnor, Charles S. (1966) [1949]. The Development of Southern Sectionalism, 1819–1848. A History of the South. Vol. V. The Littlefield Fund for Southern History of the University of Texas; Afterword by Edwin A. Miles (1st Paperback ed.). Baton Rouge, Louisiana: Louisiana State University Press. doi:10.1086/ahr/54.3.619. OCLC 7046572960.
- Waring, Joseph Ioor (December 1968). "The Yellow Fever Epidemic of Savannah in 1820, with a Sketch of Dr. William Coffee Daniell". The Georgia Historical Quarterly. LII (4). Georgia Historical Society: 398–404. ISSN 2169-852X. JSTOR 40578899. OCLC 565102618.
