= Franklin Square (Savannah, Georgia) =

Public square in Savannah, Georgia

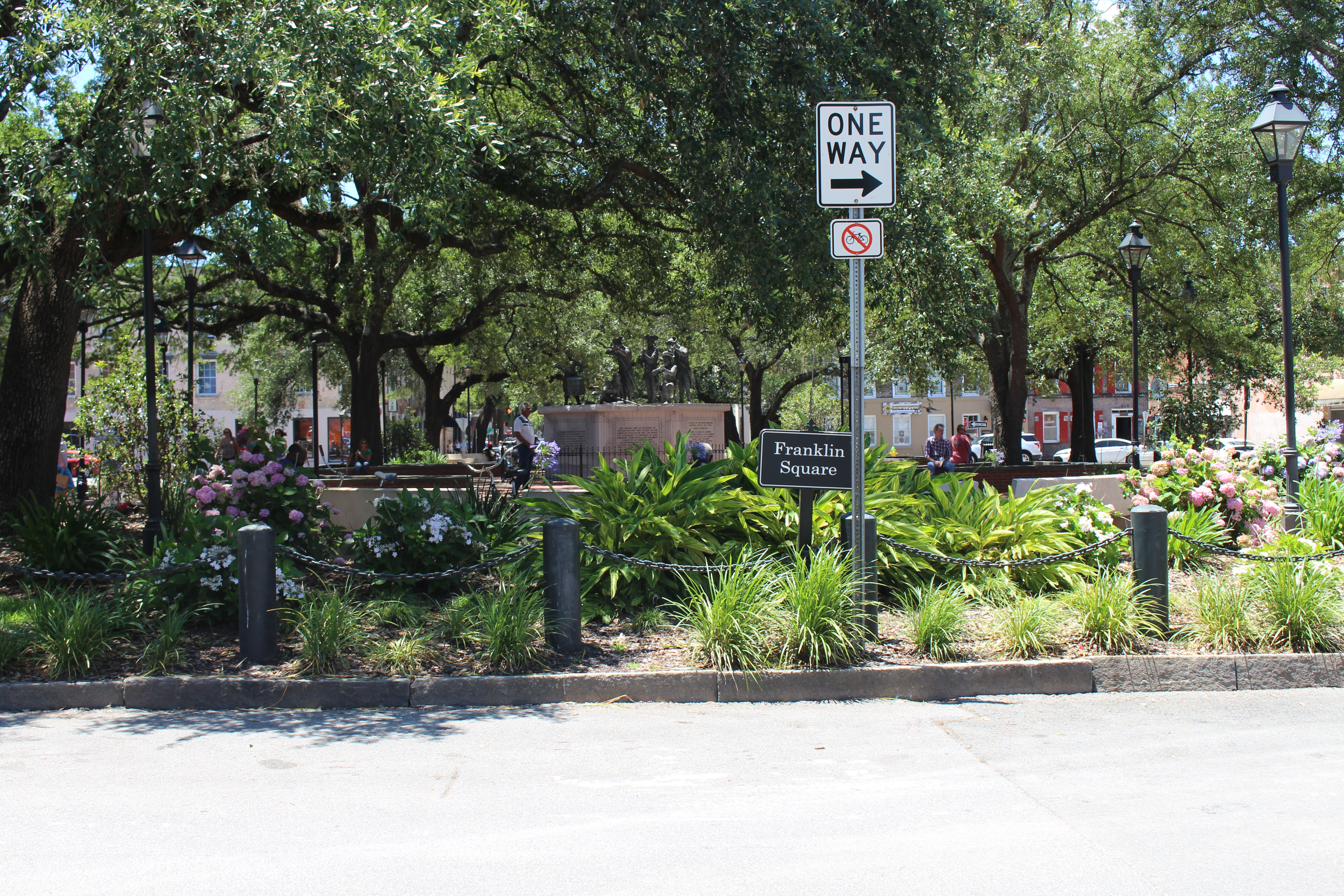
- 2017
- Interactive map of Franklin Square
- Namesake: Benjamin Franklin
- Maintained by: City of Savannah
- Location: Savannah, Georgia, U.S.
- Coordinates: 32.0810°N 81.0959°W
- North: Montgomery Street
- East: West St. Julian Street
- South: Montgomery Street
- West: West St. Julian Street

Construction
- Completion: 1790 (236 years ago)

Franklin Square is one of the 22 squares of Savannah, Georgia, United States. It is located in the northernmost row of the city's five rows of squares, at Montgomery Street and West St. Julian Street. It is west of Ellis Square in the northwestern corner of the city's grid of squares. The square now anchors the western end of the City Market retail area.

The oldest building on the square is 317 West Bryan Street, the Abram Minis Building, which dates to 1846.

The square is named for Benjamin Franklin, one of the Founding Fathers of the United States.

The Great Savannah Fire of 1820 started in a livery stable on the square.

The square once contained a 40-foot (12 m)-tall water tower to distribute water to residents. It was built with after the previous system of public and private surface wells was overwhelmed by the rising population of the city. The water was taken out of the Savannah River west of the Ogelthorpe Canal Basin before being filtered and pumped up to the water tower. Because of the tower, Franklin Square was also known as Water Tank Square and Water Tower Square. It was later nicknamed Reservoir Square, after an 87-foot (27 m) high reservoir which occupied the square in the 19th century. It held around 180,000 gallons of water.

The square was destroyed in 1935 with the routing of U.S. Highway 17 on Montgomery Street but was restored in the mid-1980s. In 1967, Montgomery Street was changed from two-way to one-way between Jones and Bay streets; in 1985, however, to assist with the restoration of Franklin Square, it was restored to two-way traffic between Bay and Broughton streets. In 2019, the bi-directional traffic flow was extended from Broughton to Liberty streets.

Bethel Church stood in the southwestern trust/civic block in the late 19th century. It was replaced by a brick warehouse.

Sweet Georgia Brown's, a piano bar which gained popularity after its appearance in John Berendt's 1994 book Midnight in the Garden of Good and Evil, was located at 312 West St. Julian Street.

== Dedication ==
Namesake	Image	Note
Benjamin Franklin		The square is named for Benjamin Franklin, one of the Founding Fathers of the United States, who served as an agent for the colony of Georgia from 1768 to 1778 and who died in 1790, the year Franklin Square was laid out.

== Markers and structures ==
Object	Image	Note
Chasseurs volontaires de Saint-Domingue (Haitian Memorial)		A memorial honoring volunteers of Saint-Domingue, Haiti, who fought with Casimir Pulaski during the siege of Savannah, created by sculptor James Mastin, was unveiled in Franklin Square in 2007. It includes a depiction of 12-year-old Henri Christophe, who became the commander of the Haitian army and King of Haiti.

== Constituent buildings ==
Each building below is in one of the eight blocks around the square composed of four residential "tything" blocks and four civic ("trust") blocks, now known as the Oglethorpe Plan. They are listed with construction years where known.

Northwestern residential/tything block

- 418 West Bryan Street (1910)
- 420 West Bryan Street (1912)
- 14 Martin Luther King Jr. Boulevard (1891/1924)

Northwestern trust/civic block

- First African Baptist Church, 23 Montgomery Street (1859)

Southwestern residential/tything block

- Augustus Walter Building, 401–405 West Congress Street (1867/1870)
- 407–415 West Congress Street (1870/1872)
- James Brannen Building, 419–423 West Congress Street (1875) – third story added 1906; roof development is 21st century

Northeastern trust/civic block

- Abram Minis Building, 317 West Bryan Street (20–22 Montgomery Street) (1846) – oldest building on the square; Vinnie Van GoGo's as of 2021
- 301–305 West St. Julian Street (1855)
- 302 West St. Julian Street (1855) – A. T. Hun Art Gallery as of 2021
- 304 West St. Julian Street (c. 1855)
- 310 West St. Julian Street (1884)
- 312 West St. Julian Street (1860)
- 314–316 West St. Julian Street (1870)

Southeastern trust/civic block

- Charles Lamar Properties, 305–307 West St. Julian Street (1892)
- 309–315 West St. Julian Street (1902)

Southeastern residential/tything block

- George Hardcastle Building, 30–38 Montgomery Street (1855)
- Charles Meitzler Building, 307–309 West Congress Street (1875)
- Germania Fire Company, 315 West Congress Street (1871)

== Gallery ==
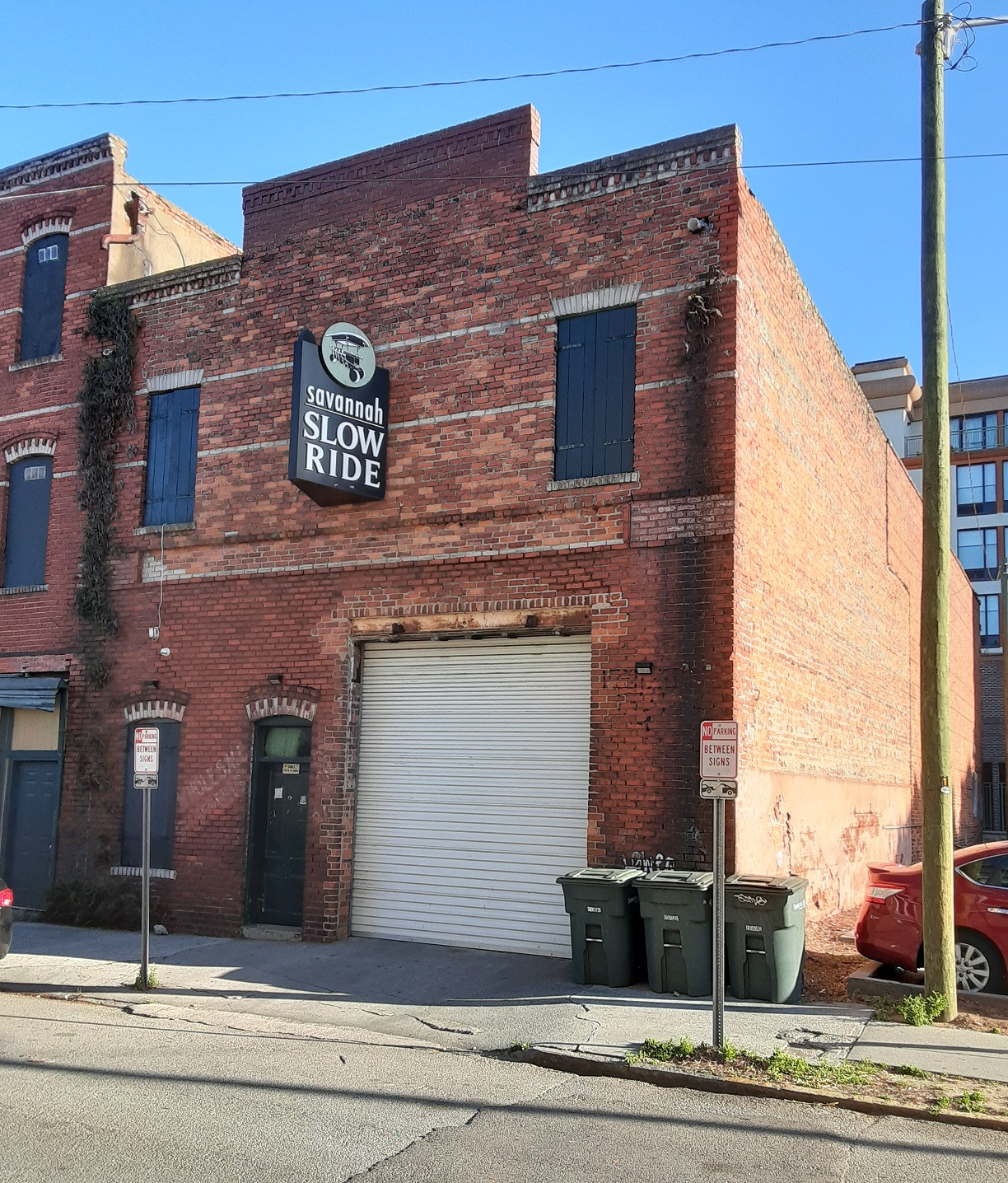
418 West Bryan Street

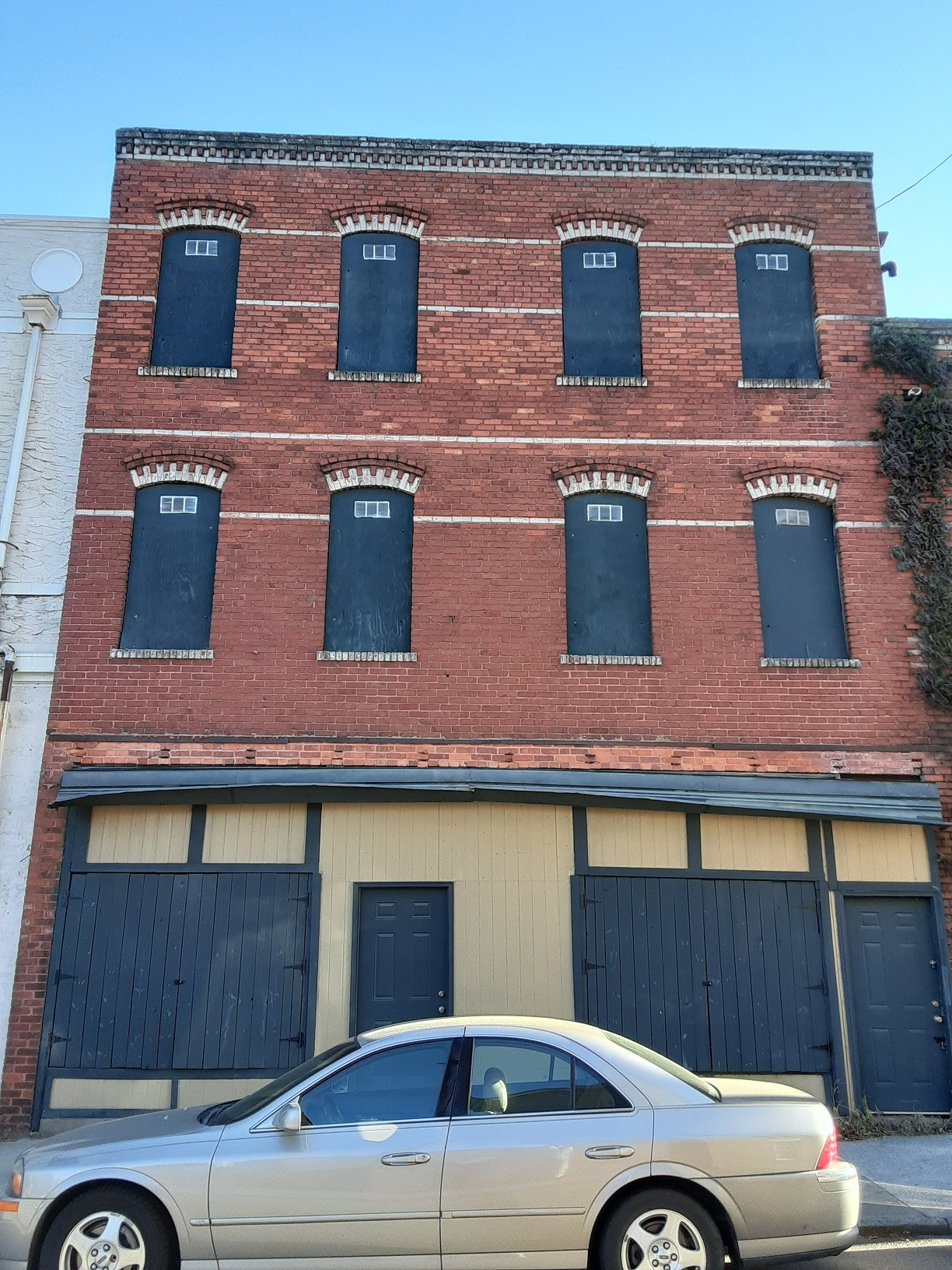
420 West Bryan Street

First African Baptist Church, 23 Montgomery Street

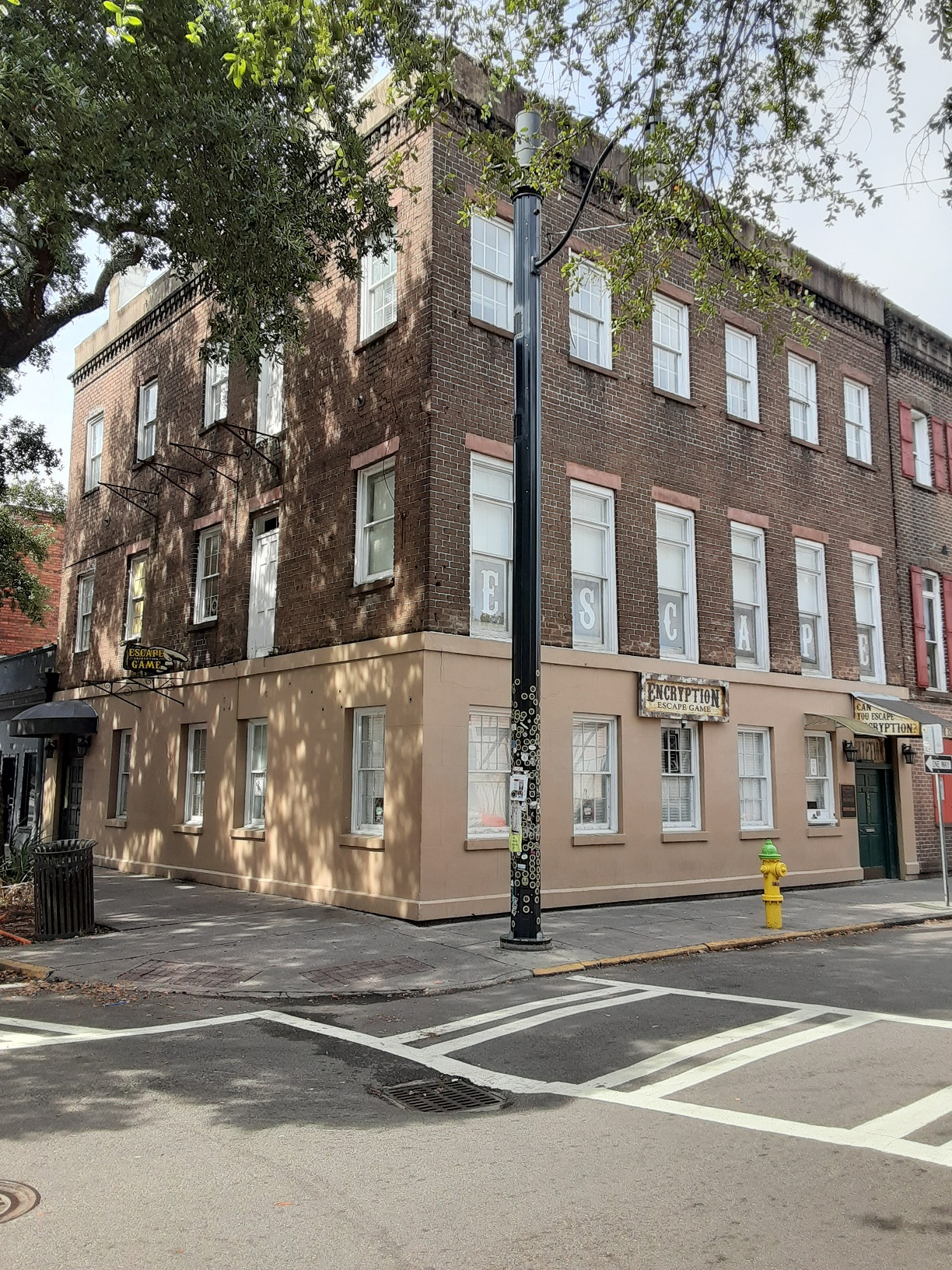
Augustus Walter Building, 401–403 West Congress Street

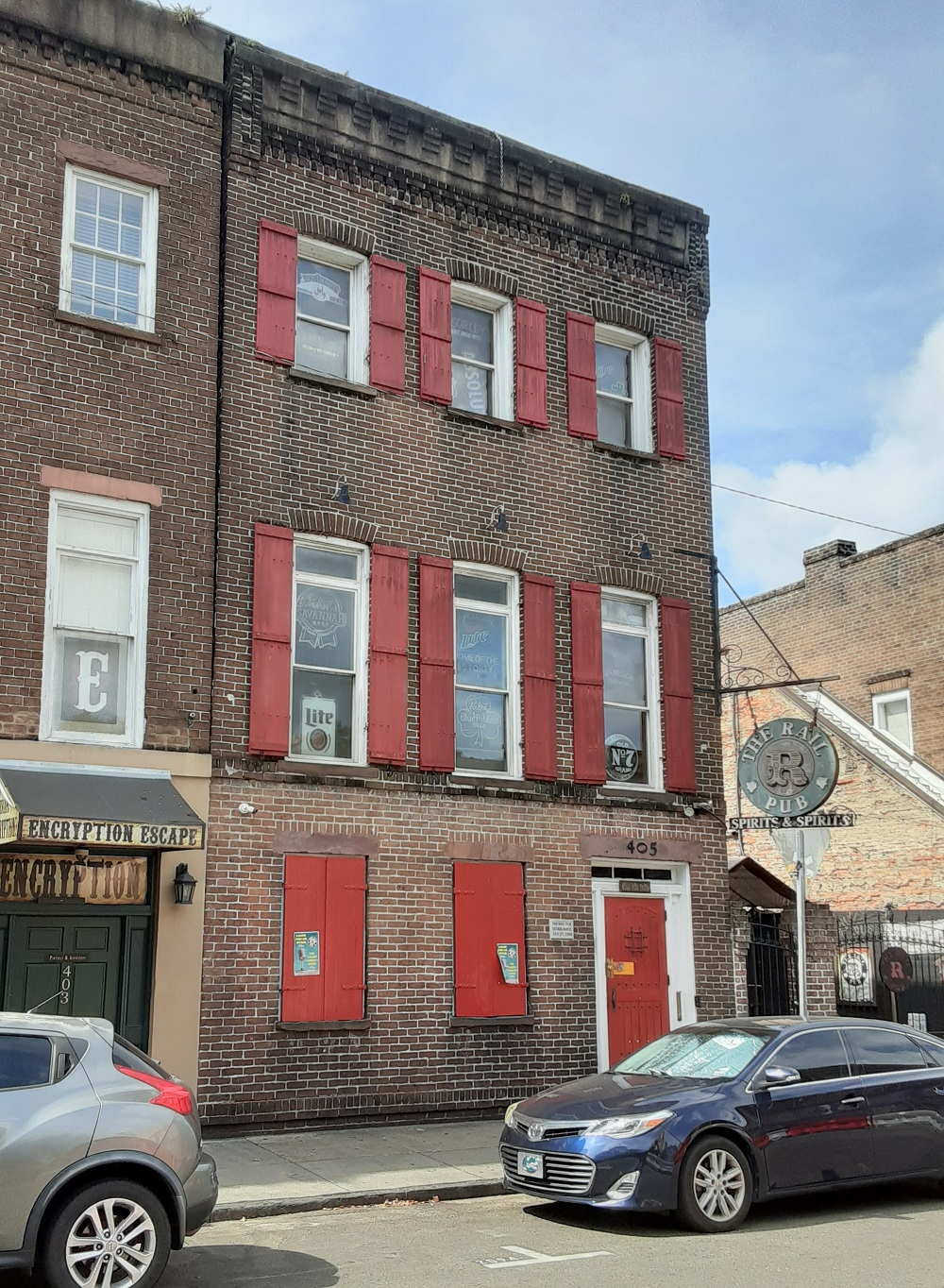
Augustus Walter Building, 405 West Congress Street

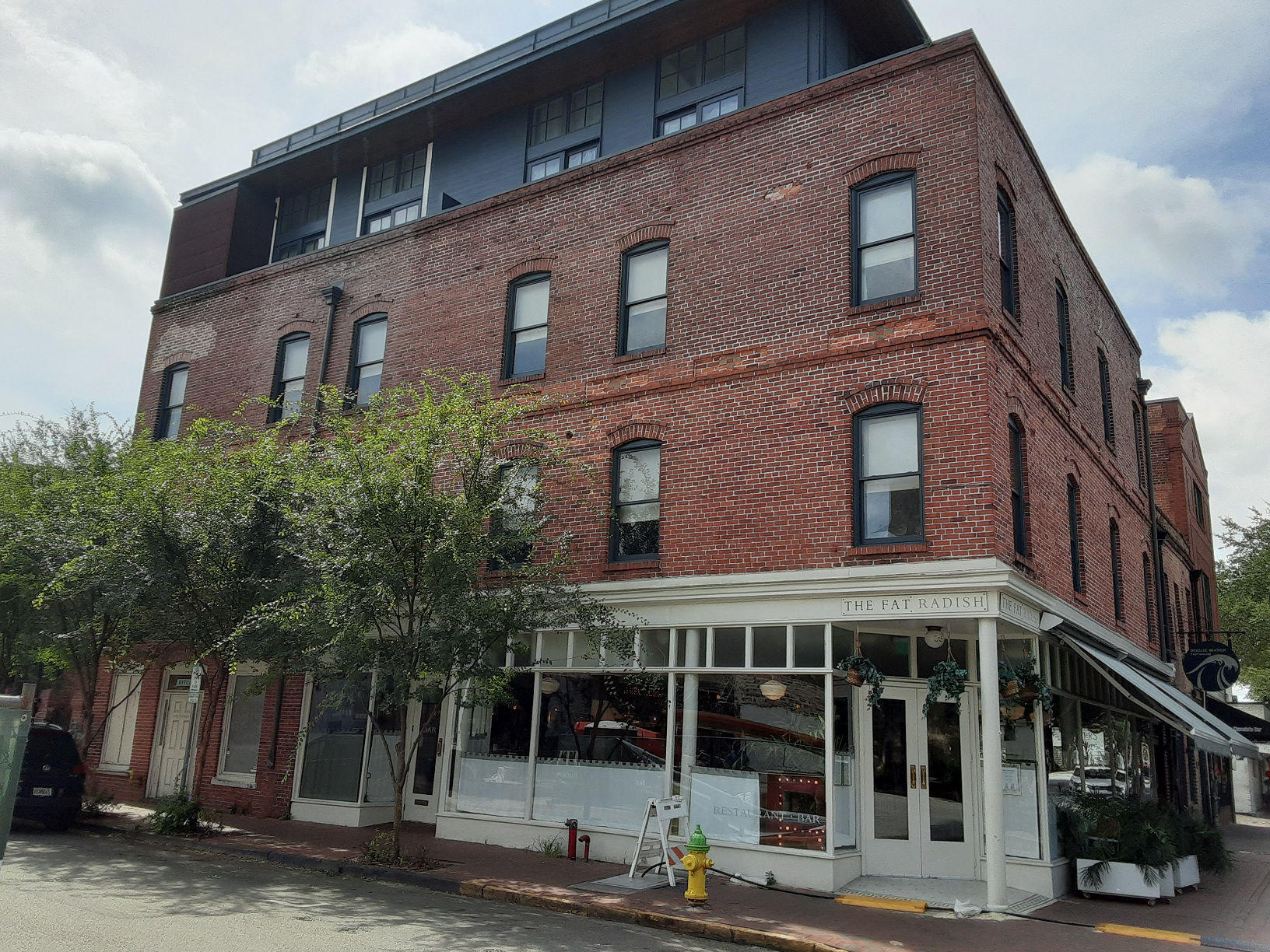
James Brannen Building, 419–423 West Congress Street

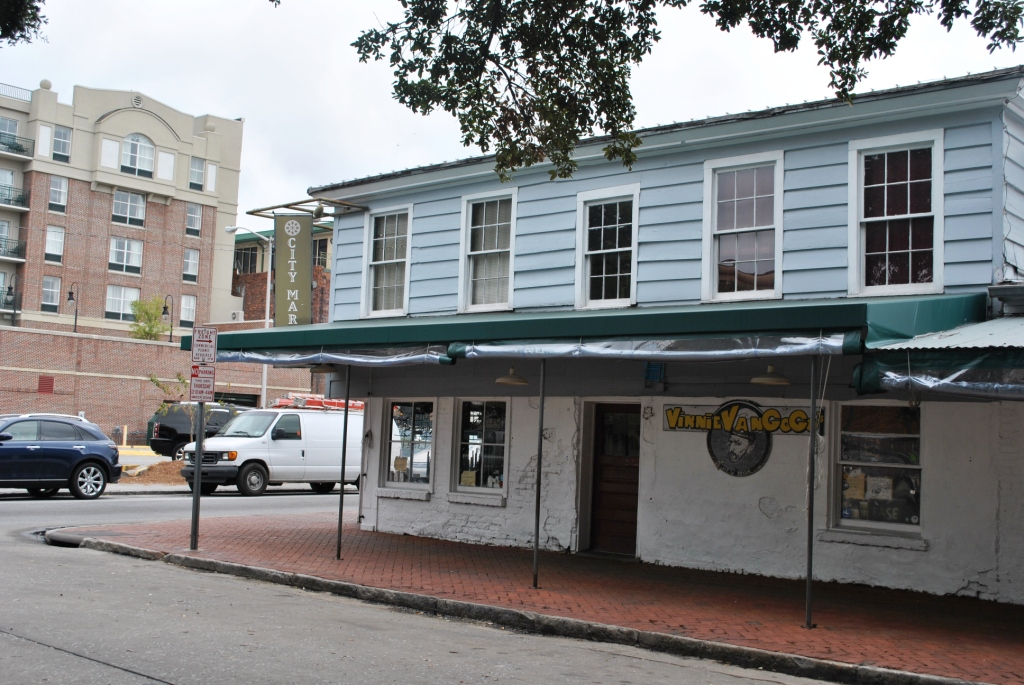
Abram Minis Building, 20–22 Montgomery Street/317 West Bryan Street

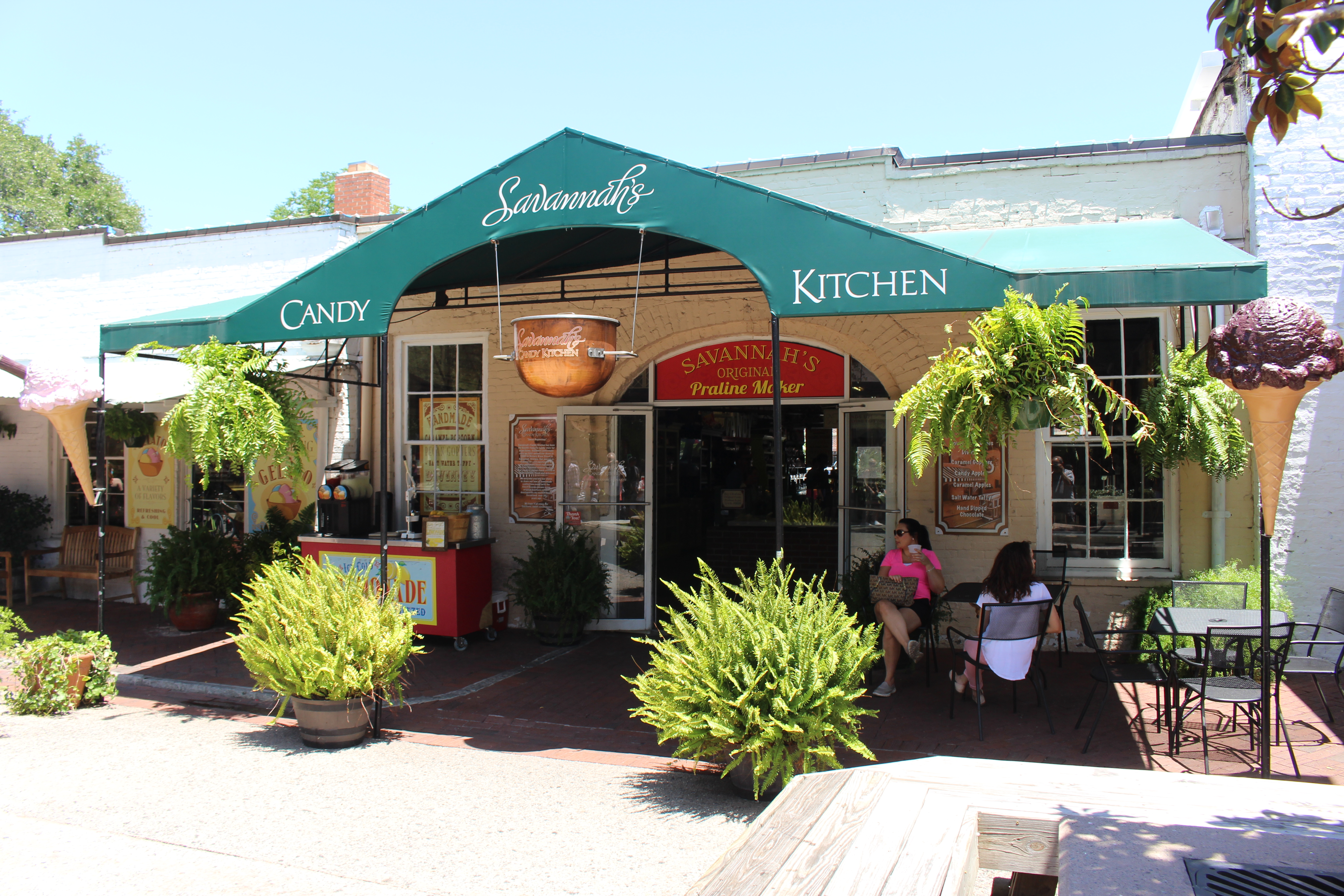
312 West St. Julian Street

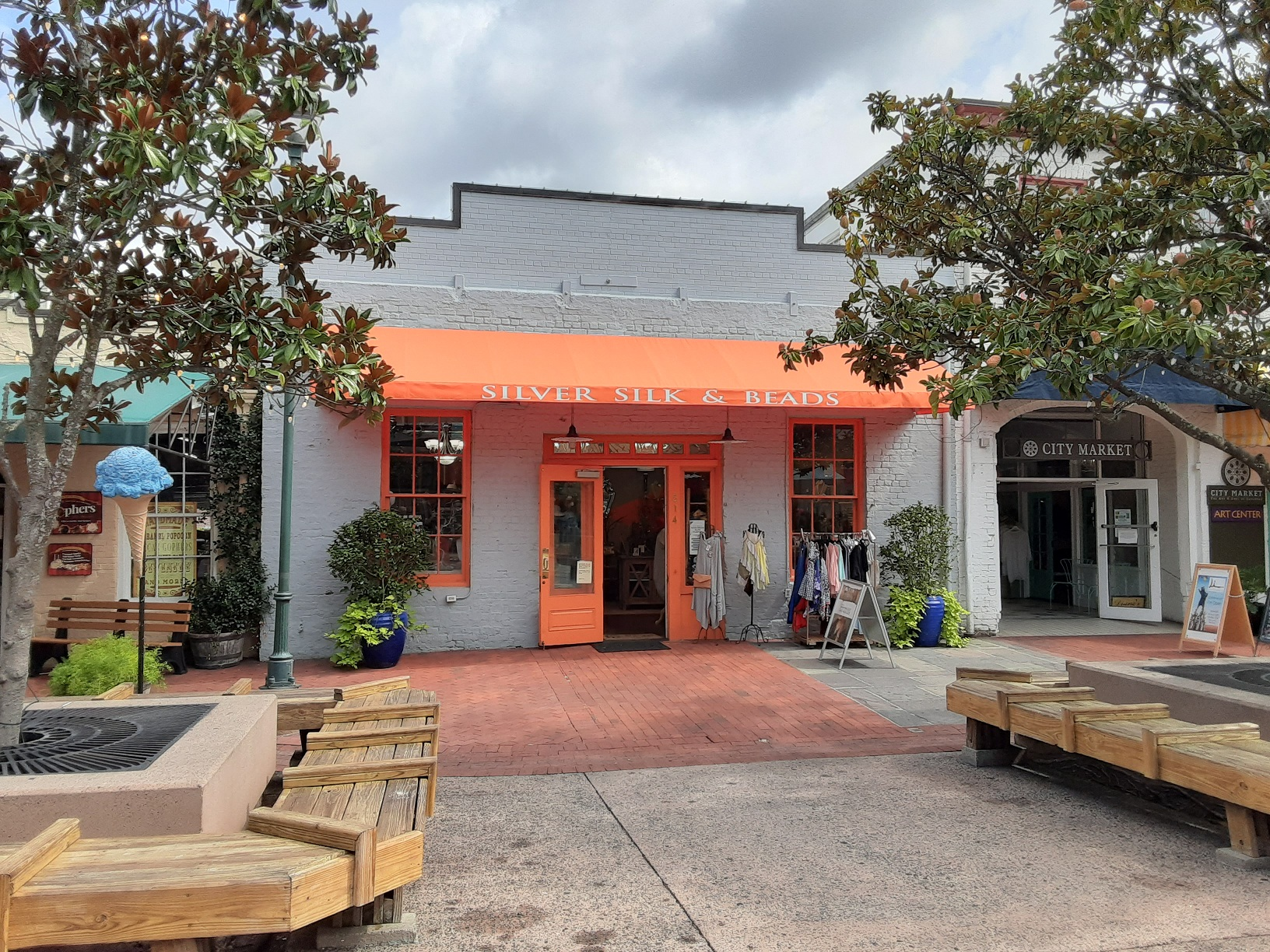
314 West St. Julian Street

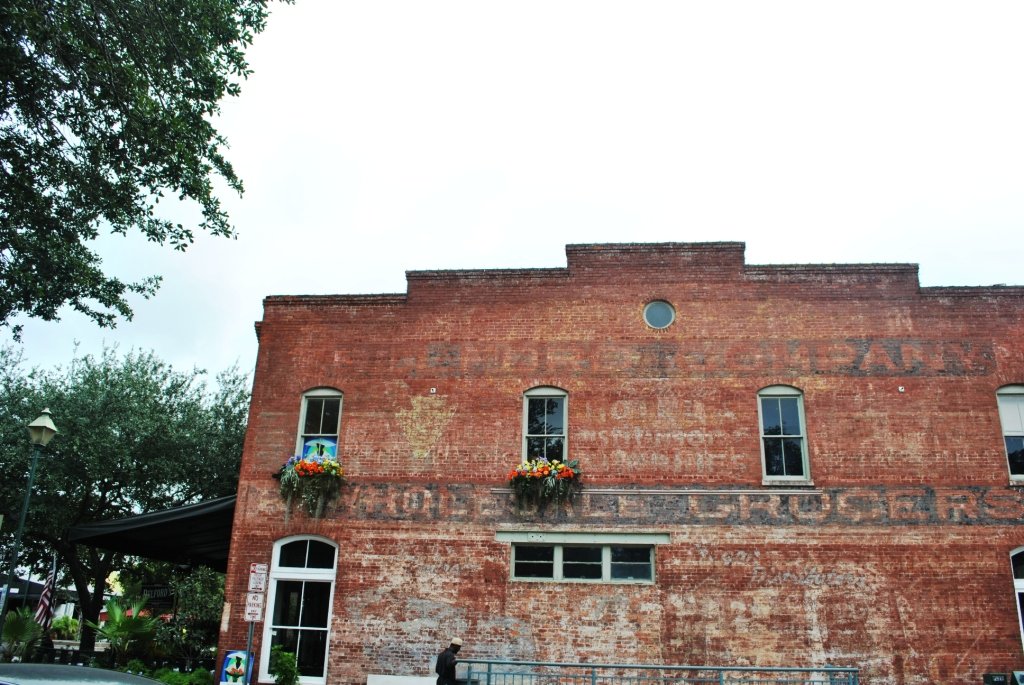
The side of 315 West St. Julian Street, from Montgomery Street

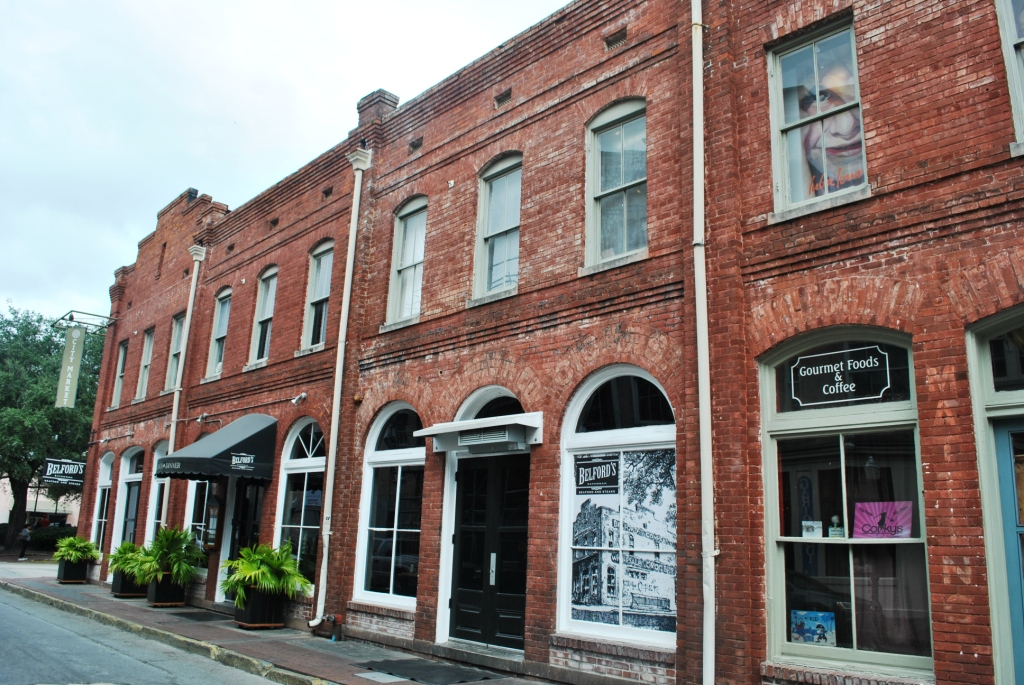
Immediately around the corner to the right, 310–312 West Congress Street, the frontages of the previous properties

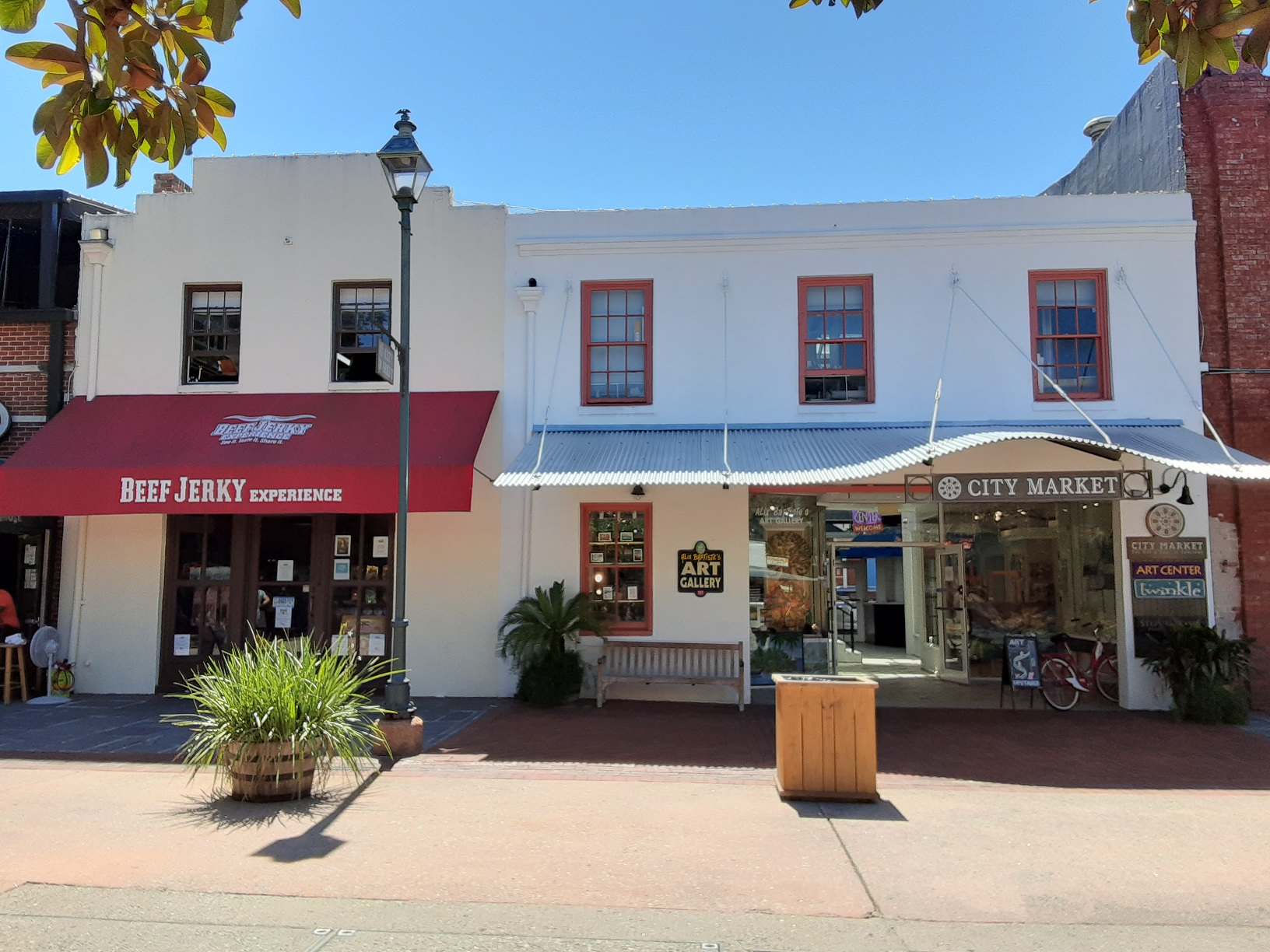
Charles Lamar Properties, 305–307 West St. Julian Street

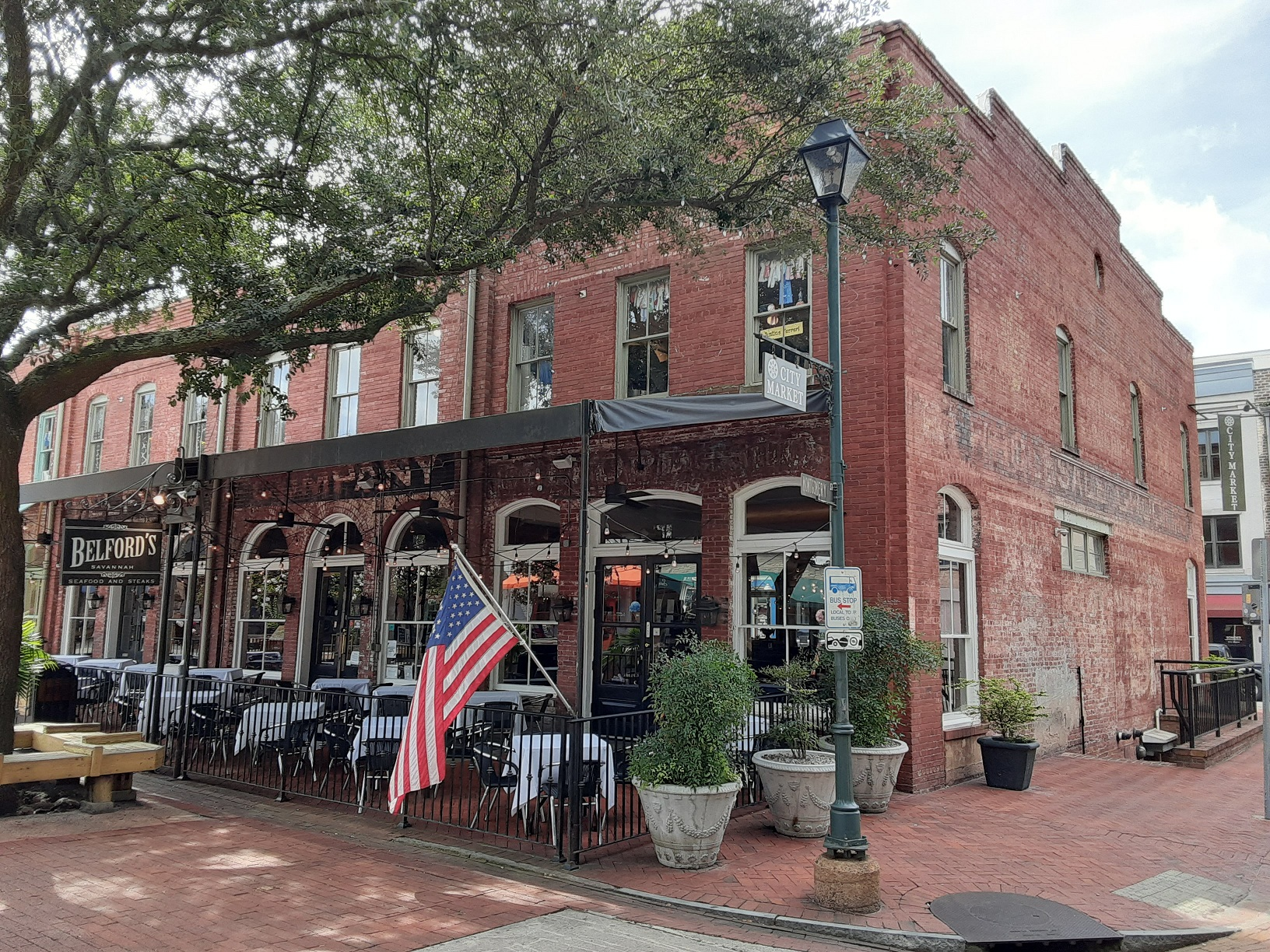
309–315 West St. Julian Street, formerly known as the Reservoir Mills

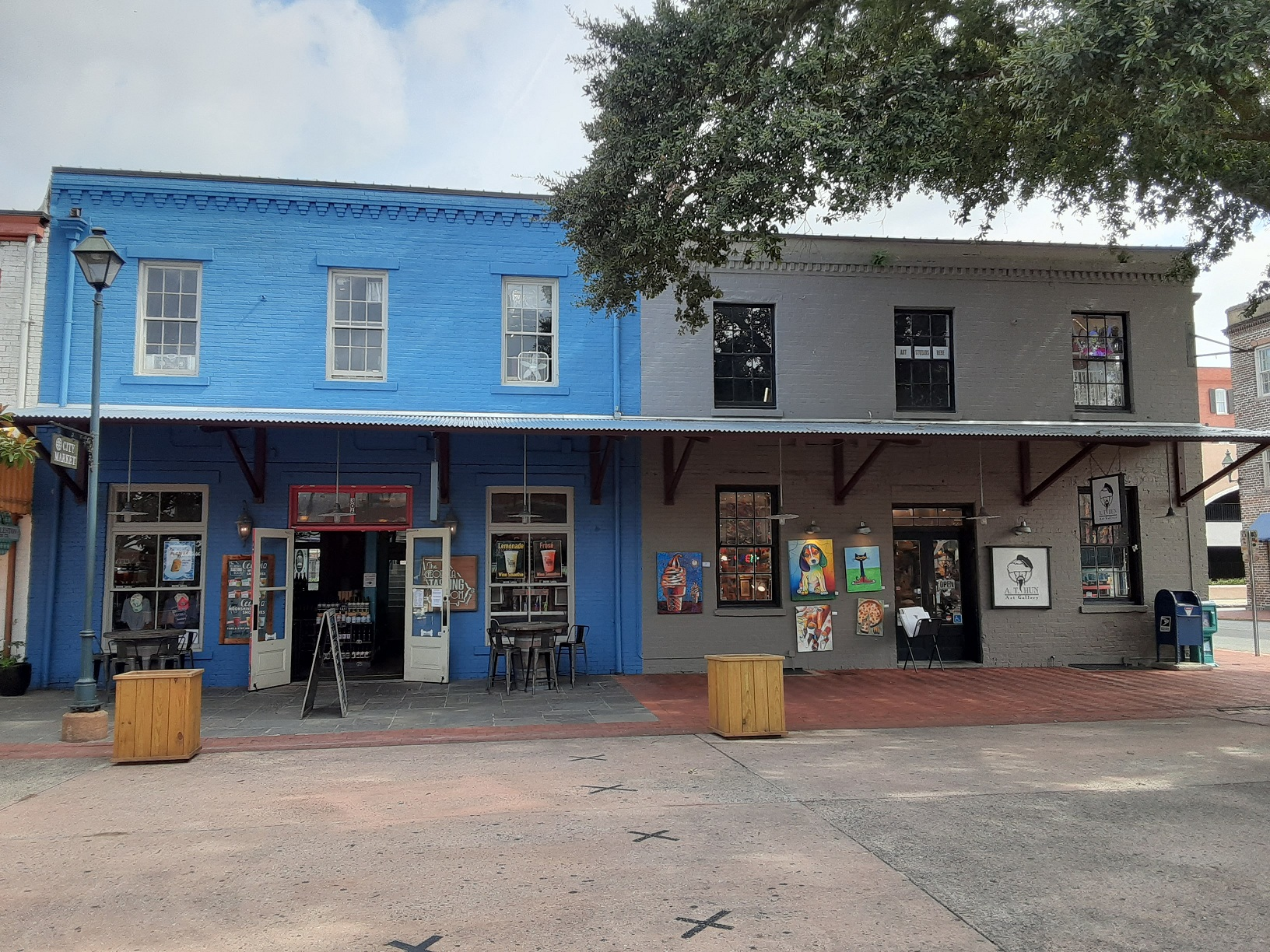
302–204 West Bryan Street

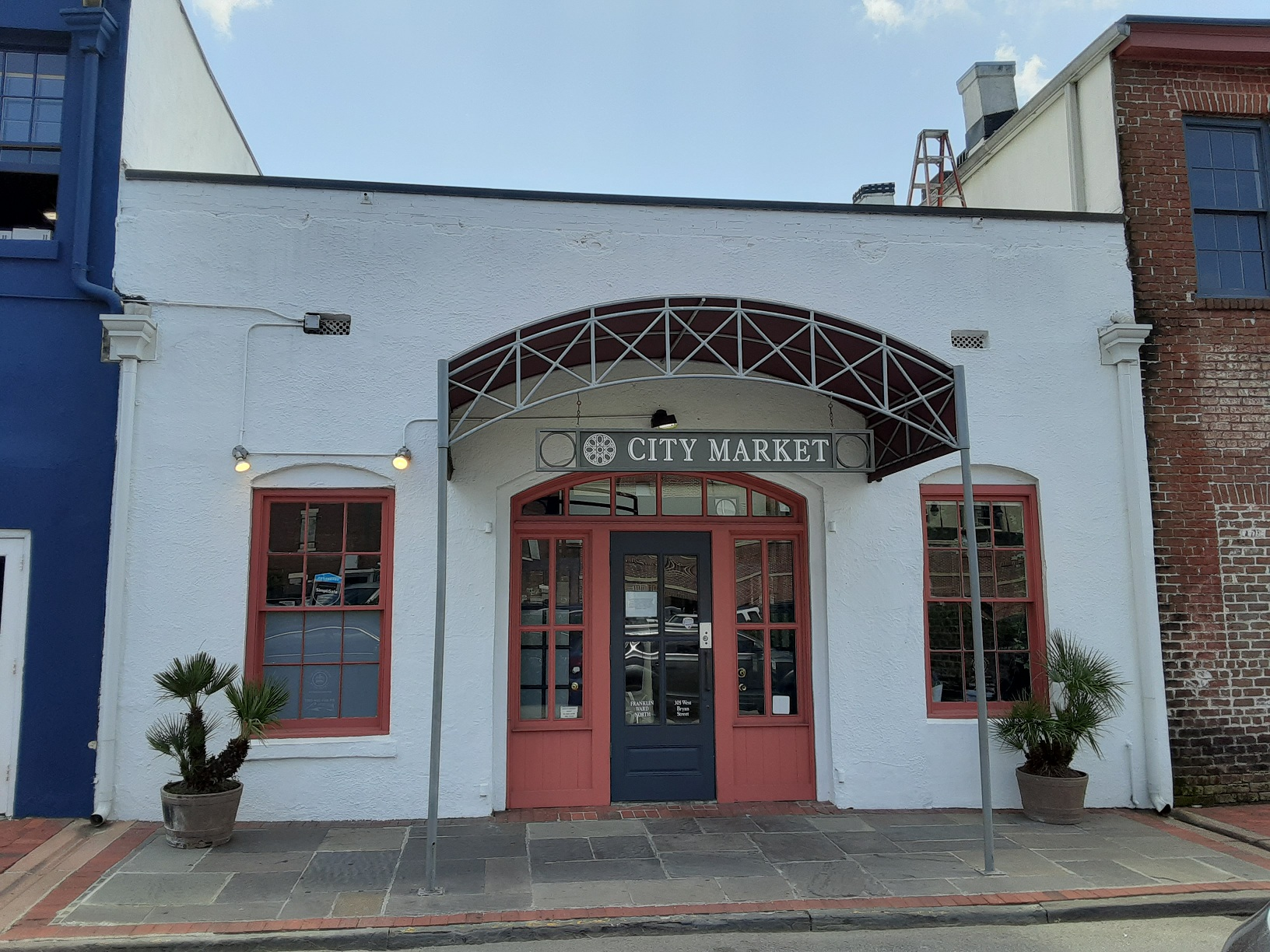
305 West Bryan Street

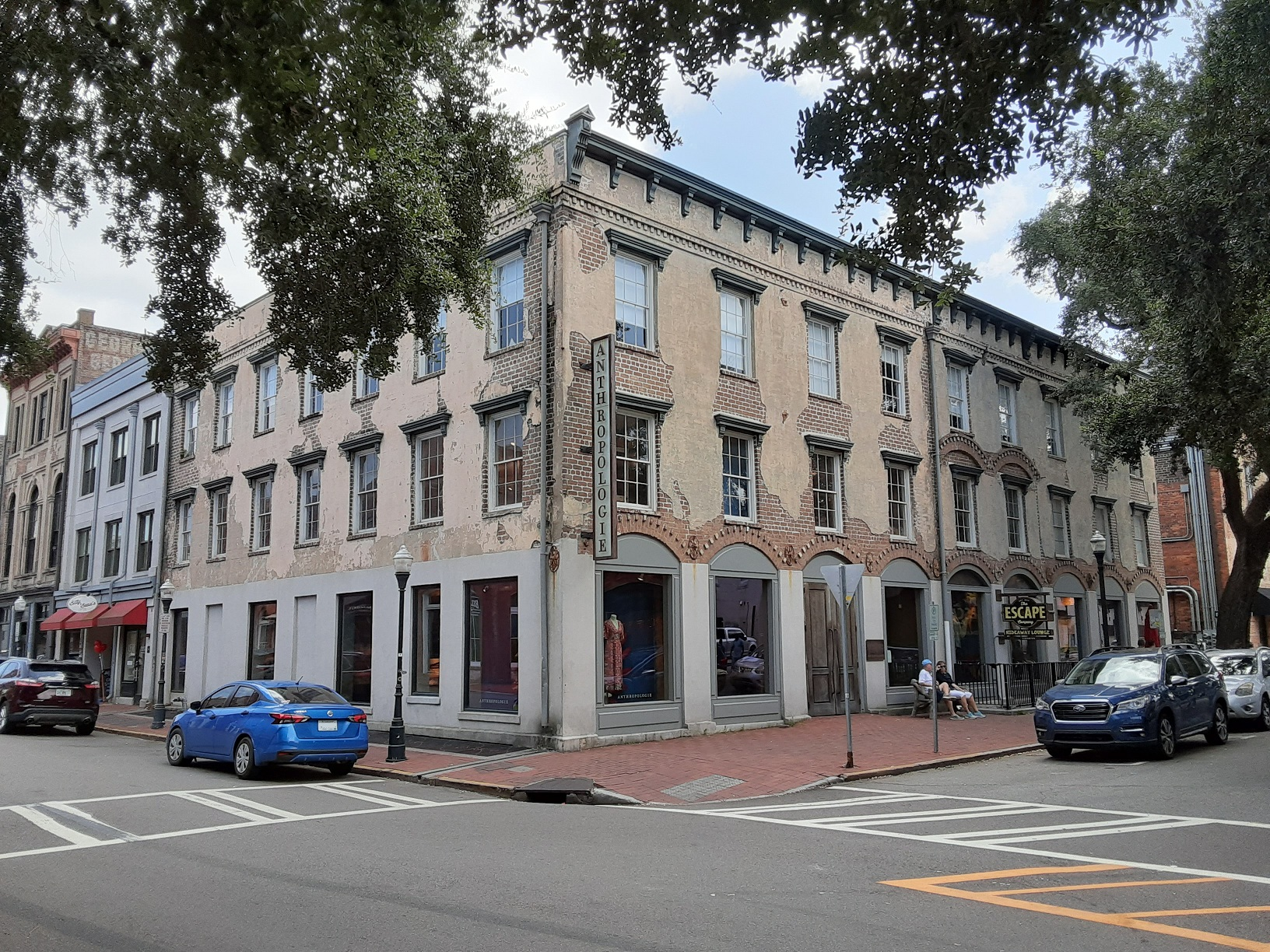
George Hardcastle Building, 30–38 Montgomery Street

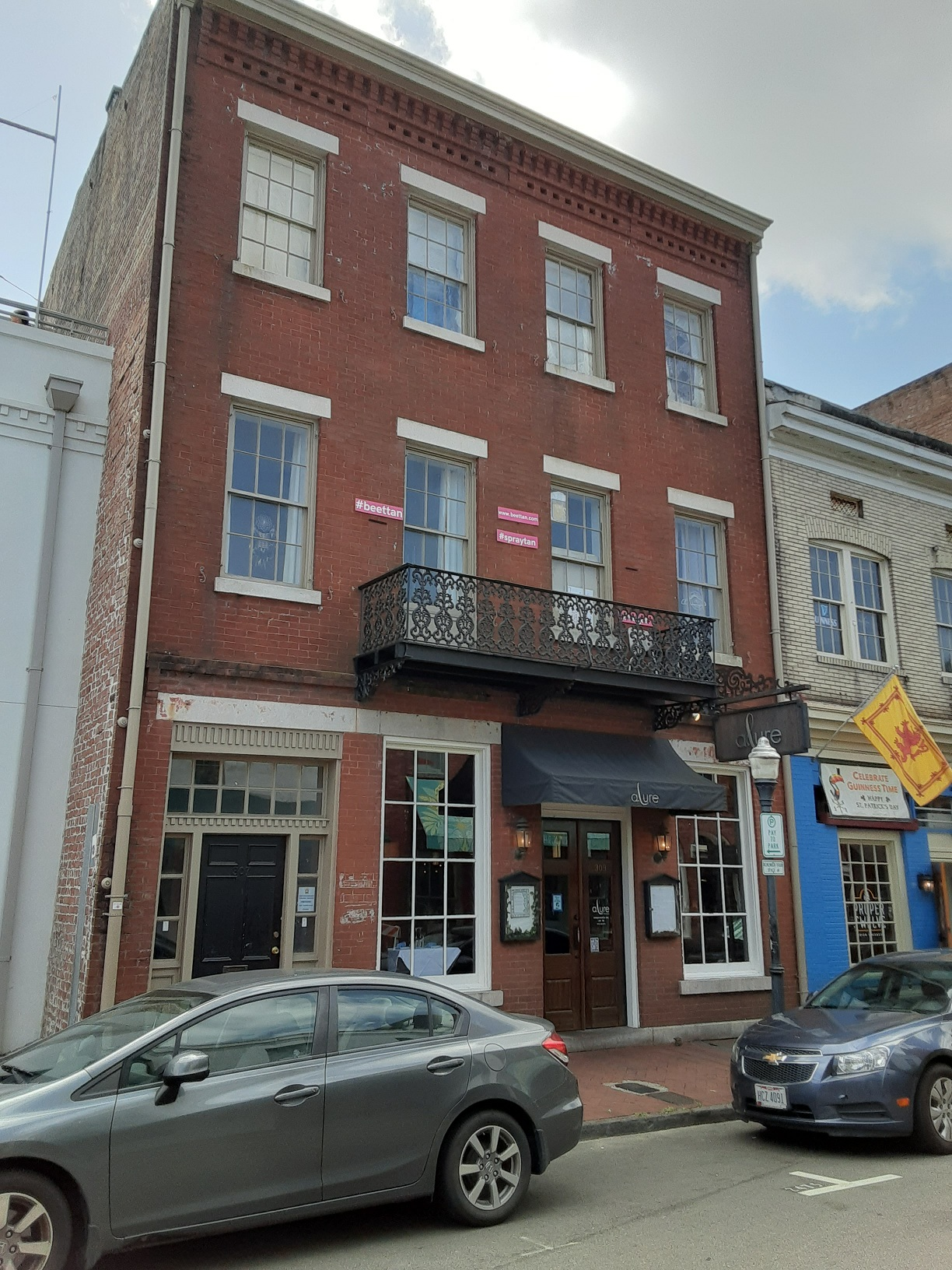
Charles Meitzler Building, 307–309 West Congress Street

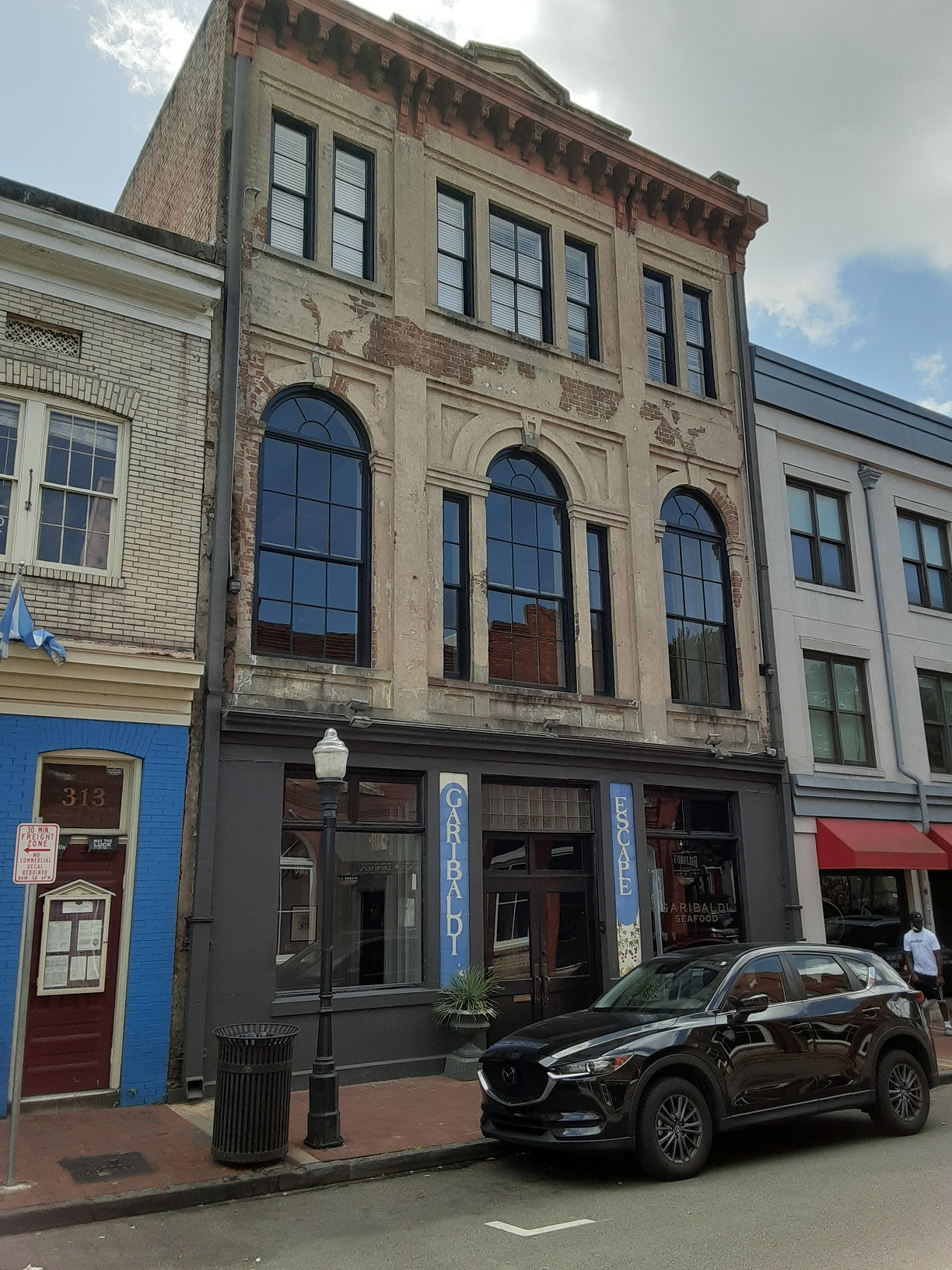
Germania Fire Company, 315 West Congress Street

== Sources ==
- Daiss, Timothy (2002). Rebels, Saints, and Sinners: Savannah's Rich History and Colorful Personalities. Gretna, Louisiana: Pelican Publishing. ISBN 1-58980-049-4. OCLC 49493485.
