= City Market (Savannah, Georgia) =

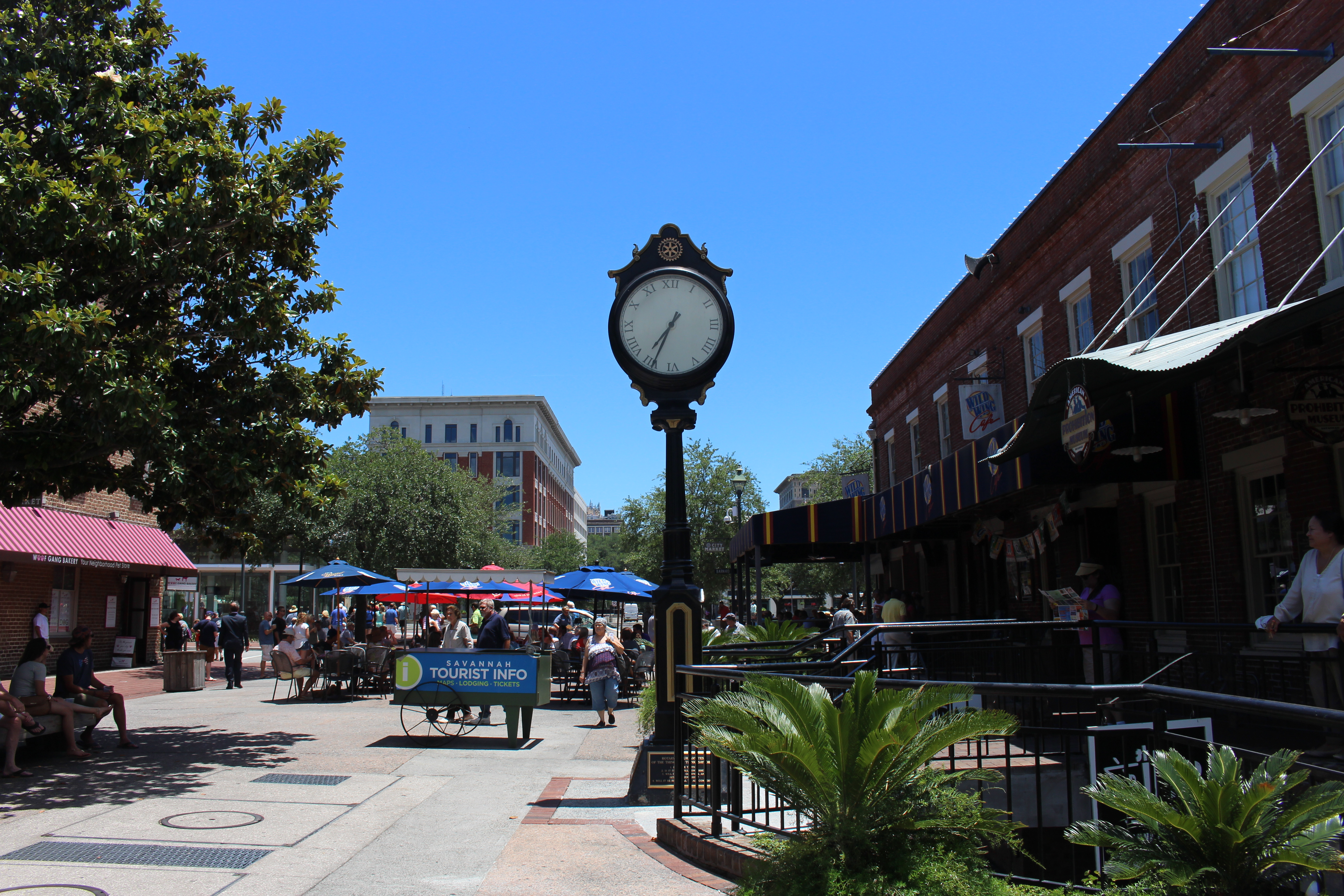
- City Market in 2017, looking east from West St Julian Street to Ellis Square
- Location: Savannah, Georgia, United States
- Coordinates: 32.0808290°N 81.0949980°W
- Opened: 1733 (293 years ago)
- Website: savannahcitymarket.com

City Market is a historic market complex in the Historic District of Savannah, Georgia. Originally centered on the site of today's Ellis Square from 1733, today it stretches west from Ellis Square to Franklin Square. Established in the 1700s with a wooden building, locals gathered here for their groceries and services. This building burned in the Great Savannah Fire of 1820 and was replaced the following year with a single-storey structure that wrapped around the square. "It was a wooden shed, about twenty-five feet wide," remembered historian Charles Seton Henry Hardee, who moved to Savannah in 1835. It had a shingle roof, supported by brick pillars. An uncovered section was used for the sale of live poultry and seafood. The covered area was mainly used for the sale of vegetables and dressed poultry. A brick building, the work of architects Augustus Schwaab and Martin Phillip Muller, was erected in 1876. They had submitted plans to the city six years earlier. The cost of the building's construction "vastly exceeded expectations" after excavations revealed weakened arches in the basement floor that required them to be replaced. It was an ornate structure with arches in the Romanesque style and large circular windows.

The interior of the Schwaab and Muller structure encompassed 33,000 square feet. The city's mayor, John Screven, described it as "roomy, capable of being kept in the highest condition of cleanliness, with ample ventilation". The construction was headed by carpenter James C. Saltus.

The market area survived two fires (in 1796 and 1820), the Civil War, and the hurricane of 1896. It is now part of the Savannah Historic District, and is a popular destination for tourists due to its restaurants, art galleries and shops, which occupy many of the buildings erected in the 19th century.

Sweet Georgia Brown's, a piano bar which gained popularity after its appearance in John Berendt's 1994 book Midnight in the Garden of Good and Evil, was located at 312 West St. Julian Street.

== Ellis Square parking garage controversy ==
In 1954, the city signed a 50-year lease with the Savannah Merchants Cooperative Parking Association, allowing the association to raze the existing structure and construct a parking garage to serve the City Market retail project. "The demolition of City Market was a disaster. That was the worst thing Savannah ever did," said preservationist Cornelia Groves. A farewell ball was held on the eve of the demolition.

Anger over the demolition of the market house helped spur the historic preservation movement (most notably the Historic Savannah Foundation) in Savannah. The outer structure of this city market building influenced the design of the Kroger grocery store on Gwinnett Street and the Publix grocery store in the Twelve Oaks shopping center on Abercorn Street.

When the garage's lease expired in 2004, the city began plans to restore Ellis Square. The old parking garage was demolished in 2006 to make way for a new public square (park) that features open spaces for public concerts, as well as an underground parking garage on Whitaker Street. The underground facility was completed and formally dedicated in January 2009.

The Ellis Square parking garage around 2005. It was demolished in 2006

== Timeline of market buildings ==
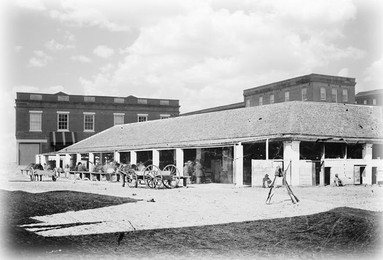
The second incarnation of the City Market building, built in 1821 and pictured here sometime between 1855 and 1876, looking northwest. Behind City Market on the right is the John Montmollin Building, a former slave market

- c. 1733–1820 – a wooden building was erected; burned down in 1820
- 1821–1876 – a single-storey structure was erected which wrapped around the square's center
- 1876–1954 – a brick structure was the third and final structure that existed; torn down by the city

== Buildings in City Market ==
- John Montmollin Warehouse
- Thomas Gibbons Range

== Gallery ==
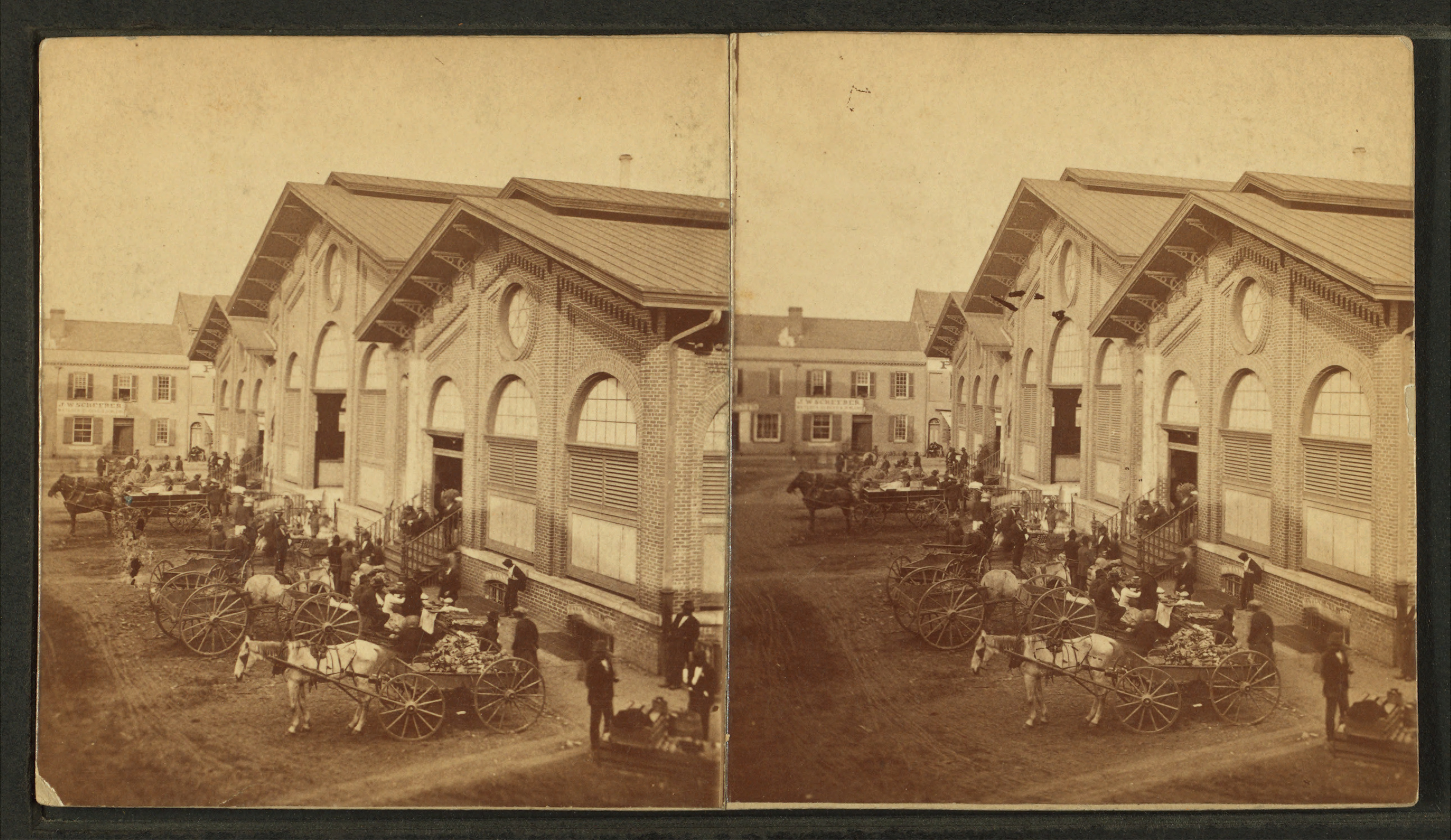
The City Market building that existed between 1876 and 1954

Interior of the market, circa 1945, showing the large brick pillars supporting the building, as well as the tiled floor, which had a Greek key border

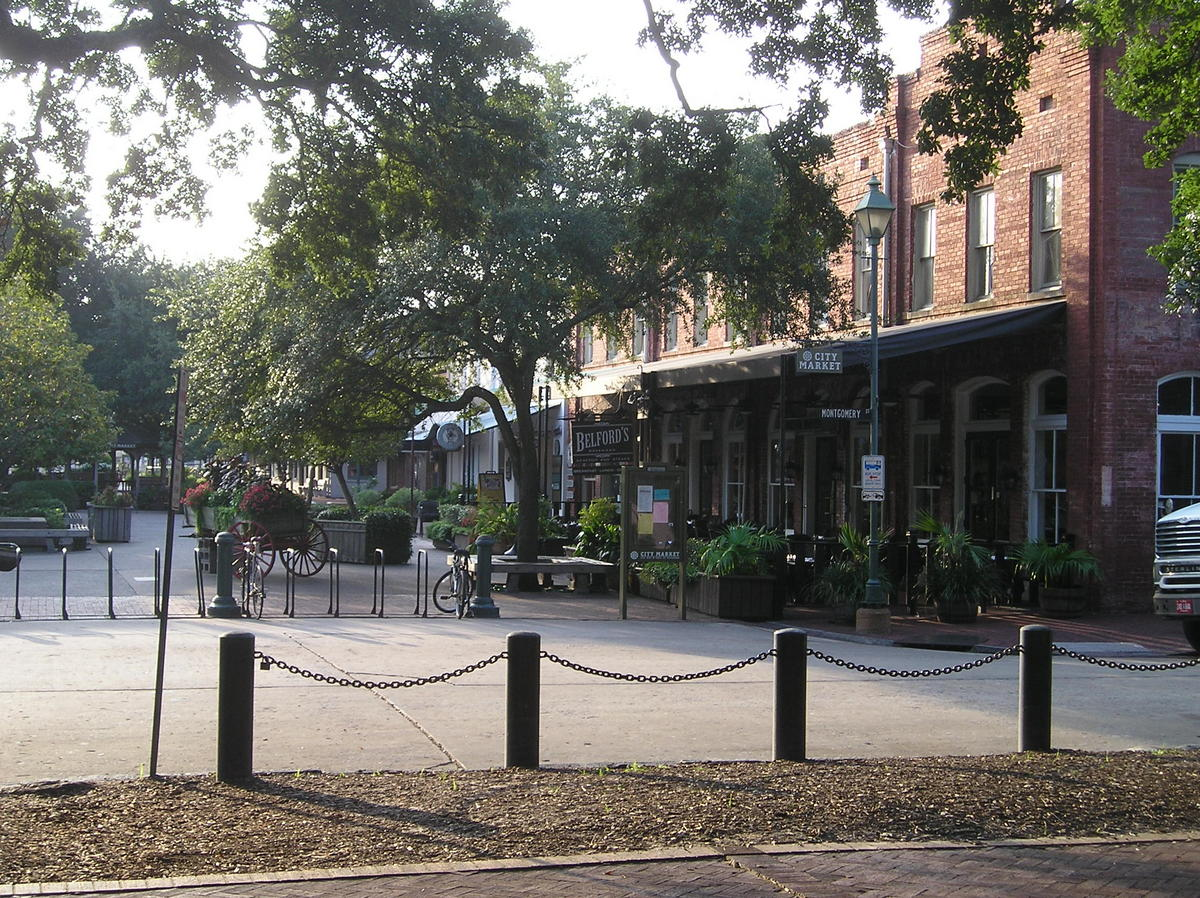
Belford's Restaurant in Franklin Square, 2008

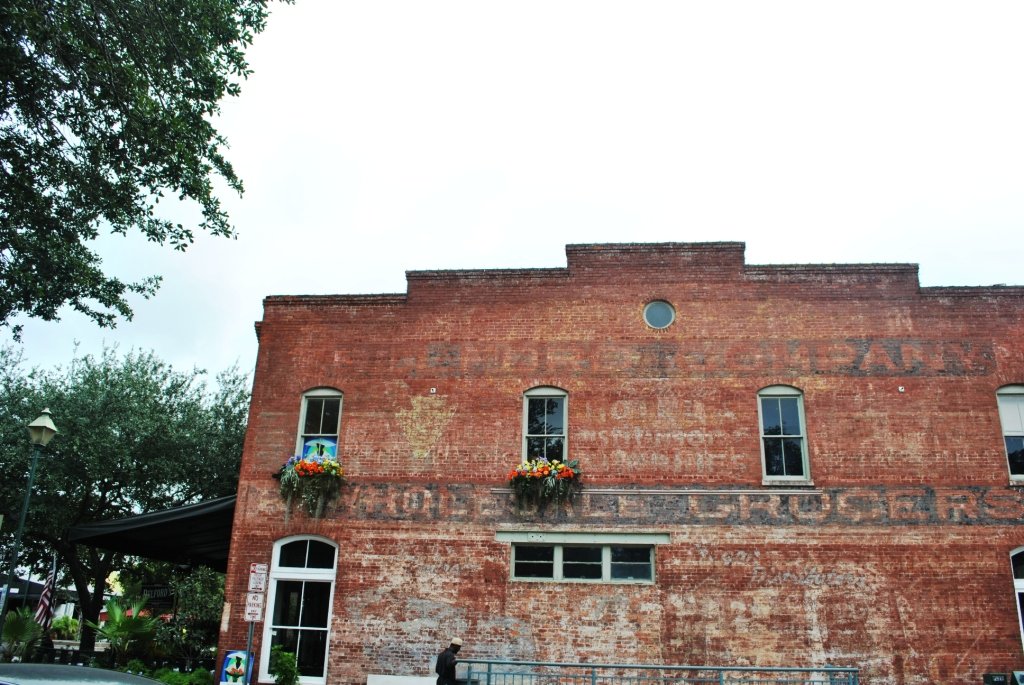
The side of the building shows the faded paint from when it was the Belford Company Wholesale Grocers

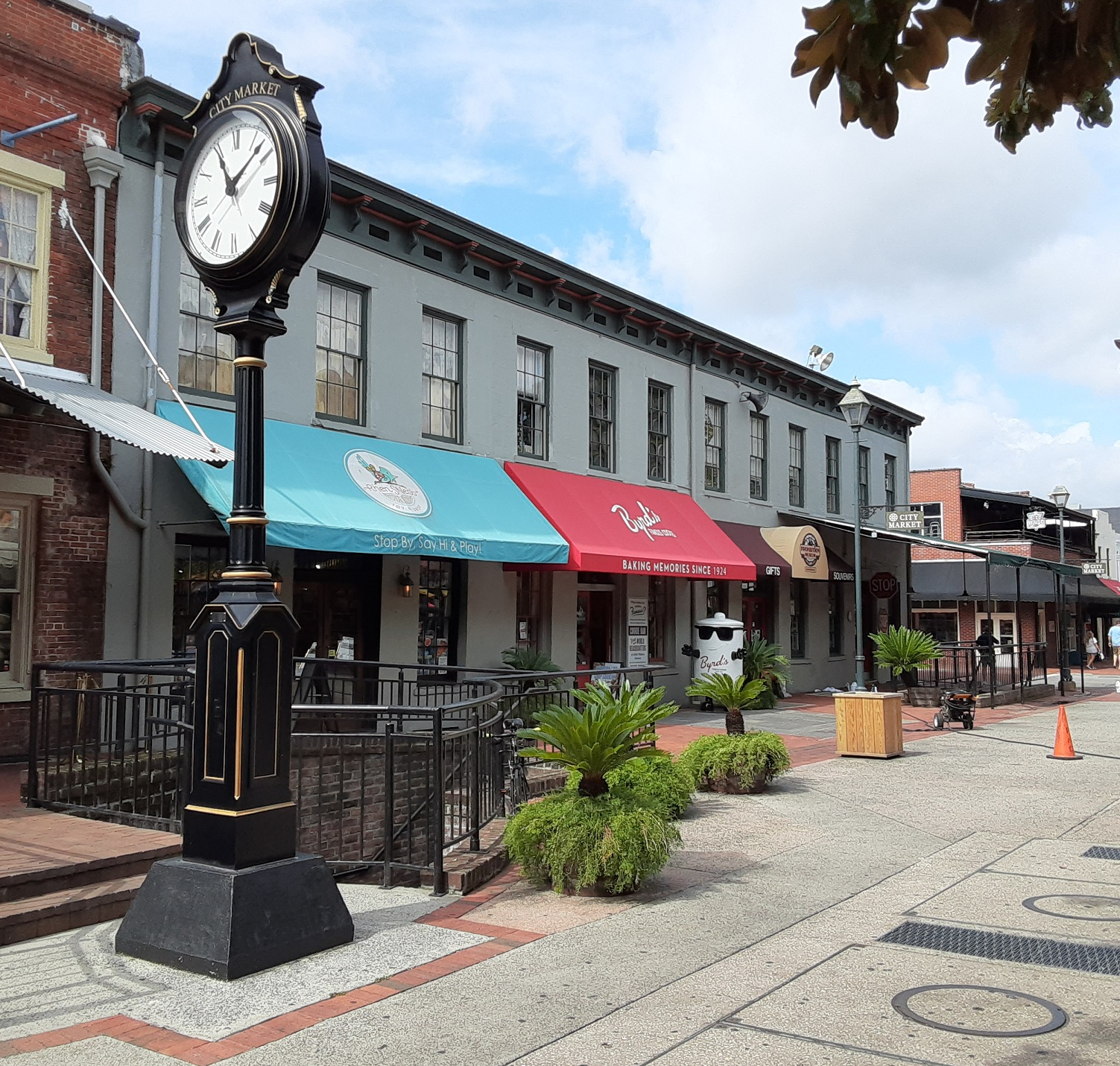
Robert McIntire Building, 221–227 West St. Julian Street in Ellis Square, 2021

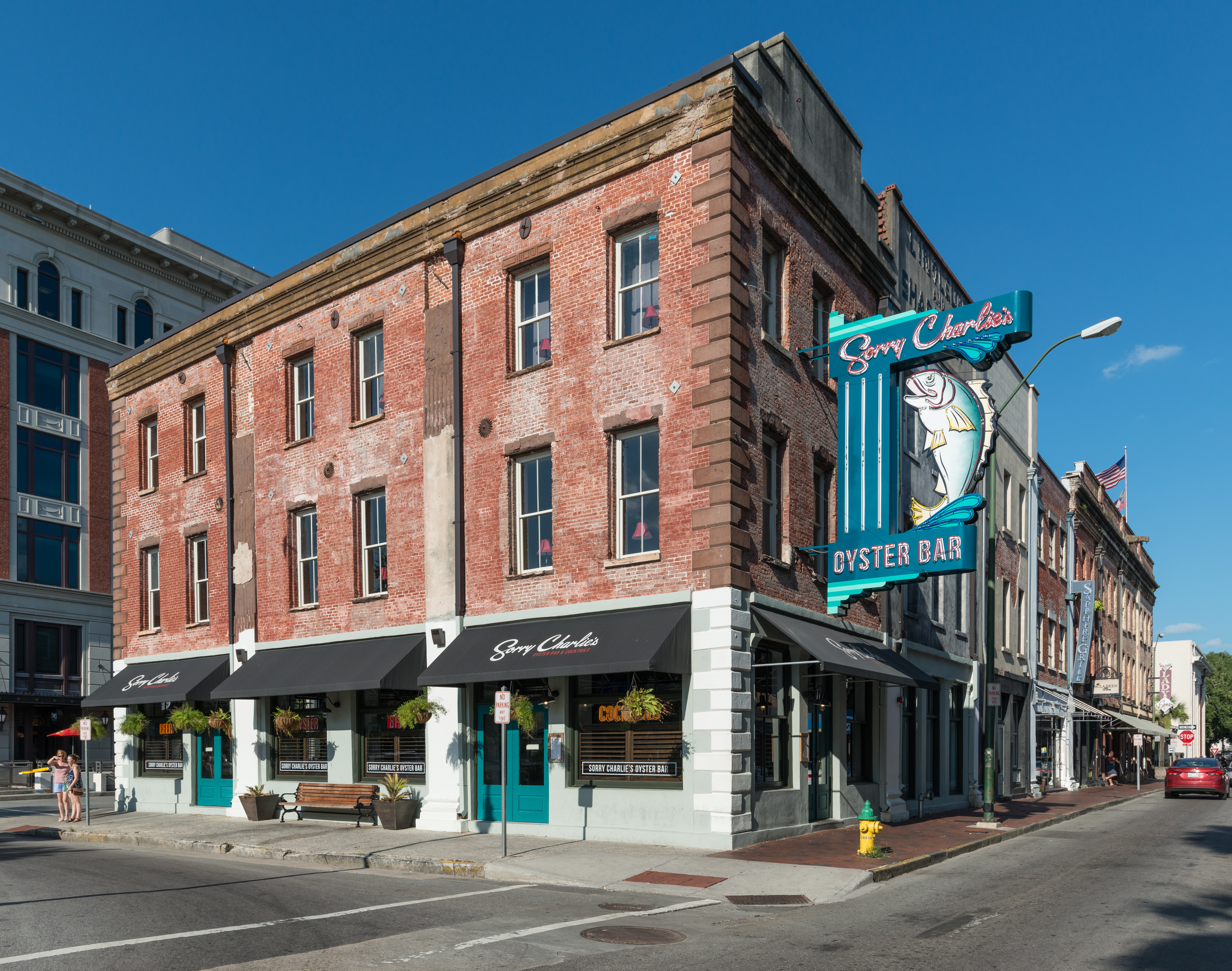
Sorry Charlie's Oyster Bar, in Ellis Square, is one of City Market's many restaurants

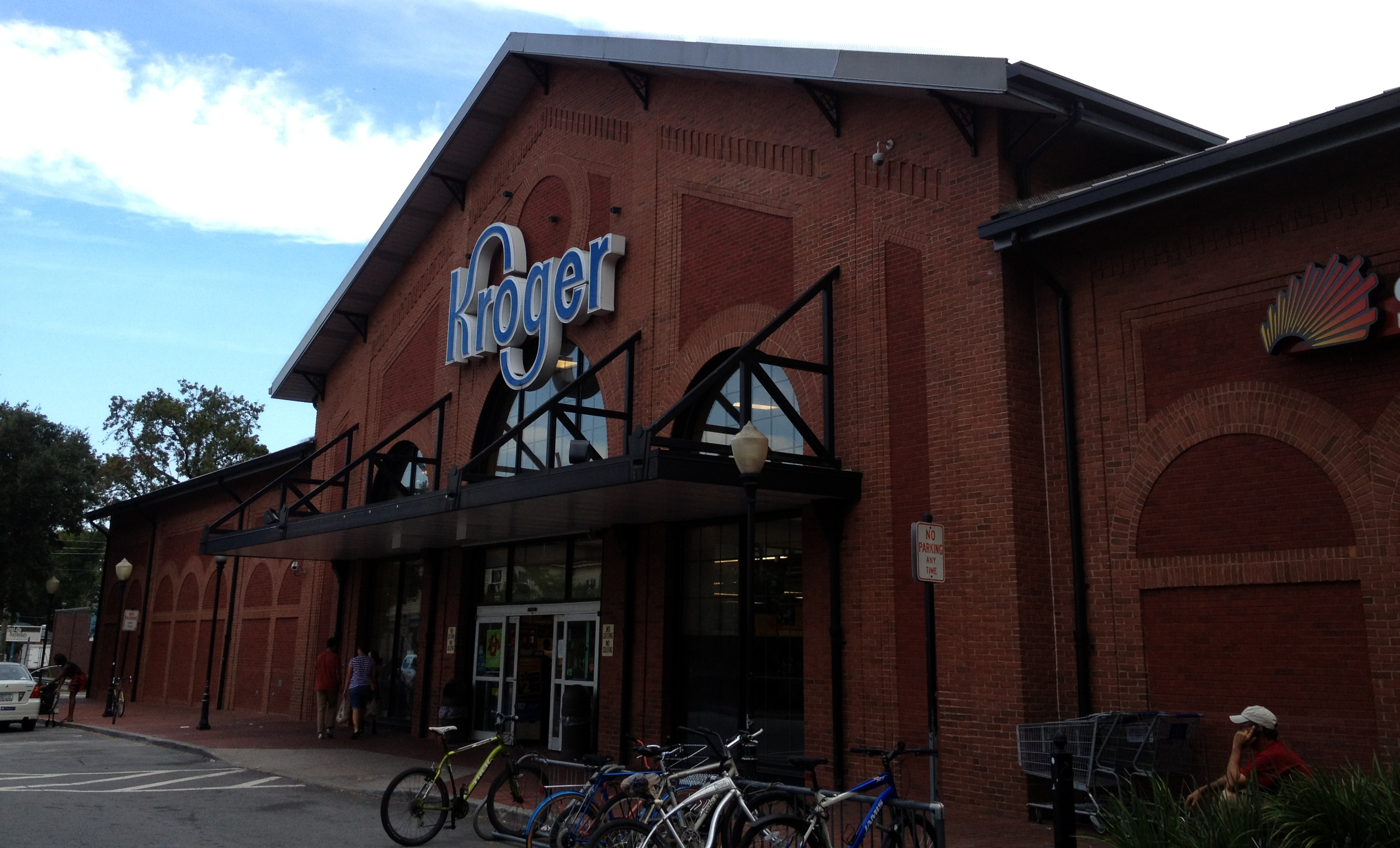
The exterior design of the Kroger grocery store on Gwinnett Street in Savannah was influenced by the former City Market building, which had three gables on each of its façades

== Bibliography ==
- Jedidiah Morse (1797), "Savannah", American Gazetteer, Boston: S. Hall, and Thomas & Andrews
