= Abram Minis Building =

Historic house in Savannah, Georgia

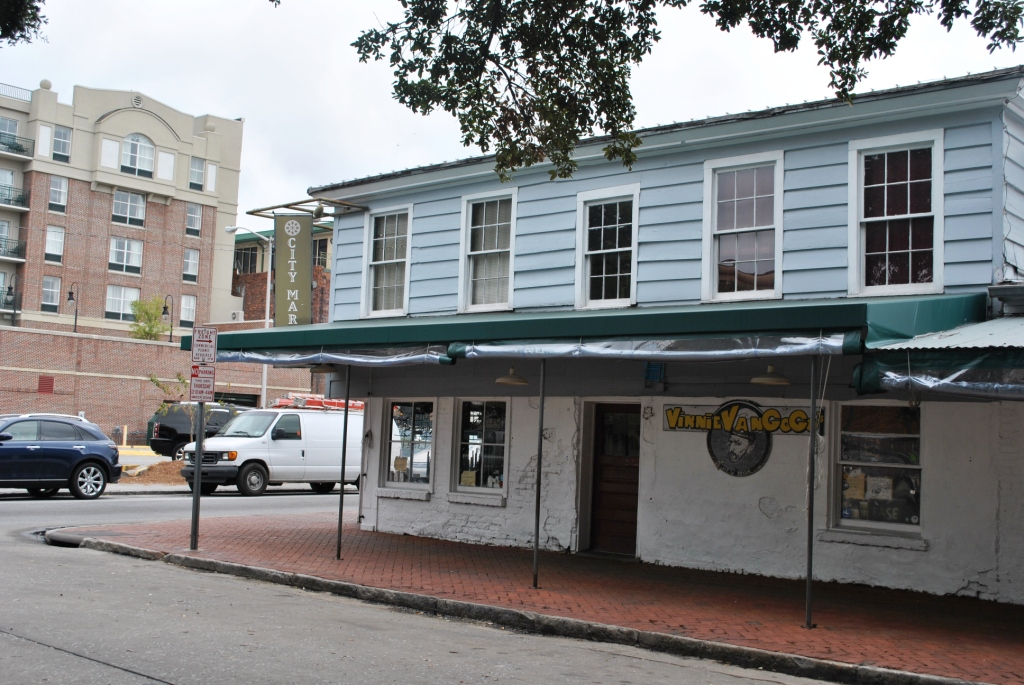
- The Montgomery Street elevation of the building (2013)
- Interactive map of the Abram Minis Building area

General information
- Location: Savannah, Georgia, U.S., 317 West Bryan Street (20–22 Montgomery Street)
- Coordinates: 32.08117562°N 81.095501°W
- Completed: 1846 (180 years ago)

Technical details
- Floor count: 2

The Abram Minis Building is a historic building in Savannah, Georgia, United States. Located in the northeastern trust block of Franklin Square, at 317 West Bryan Street and 20–22 Montgomery Street, it dates to 1846, making it the oldest extant building on the square. It was built as a commercial property for 26-year-old Abraham Minis, a prominent merchant of the city and founder of A. Minis & Sons.

In a survey for the Historic Savannah Foundation, Mary Lane Morrison found the building to be of significant status.

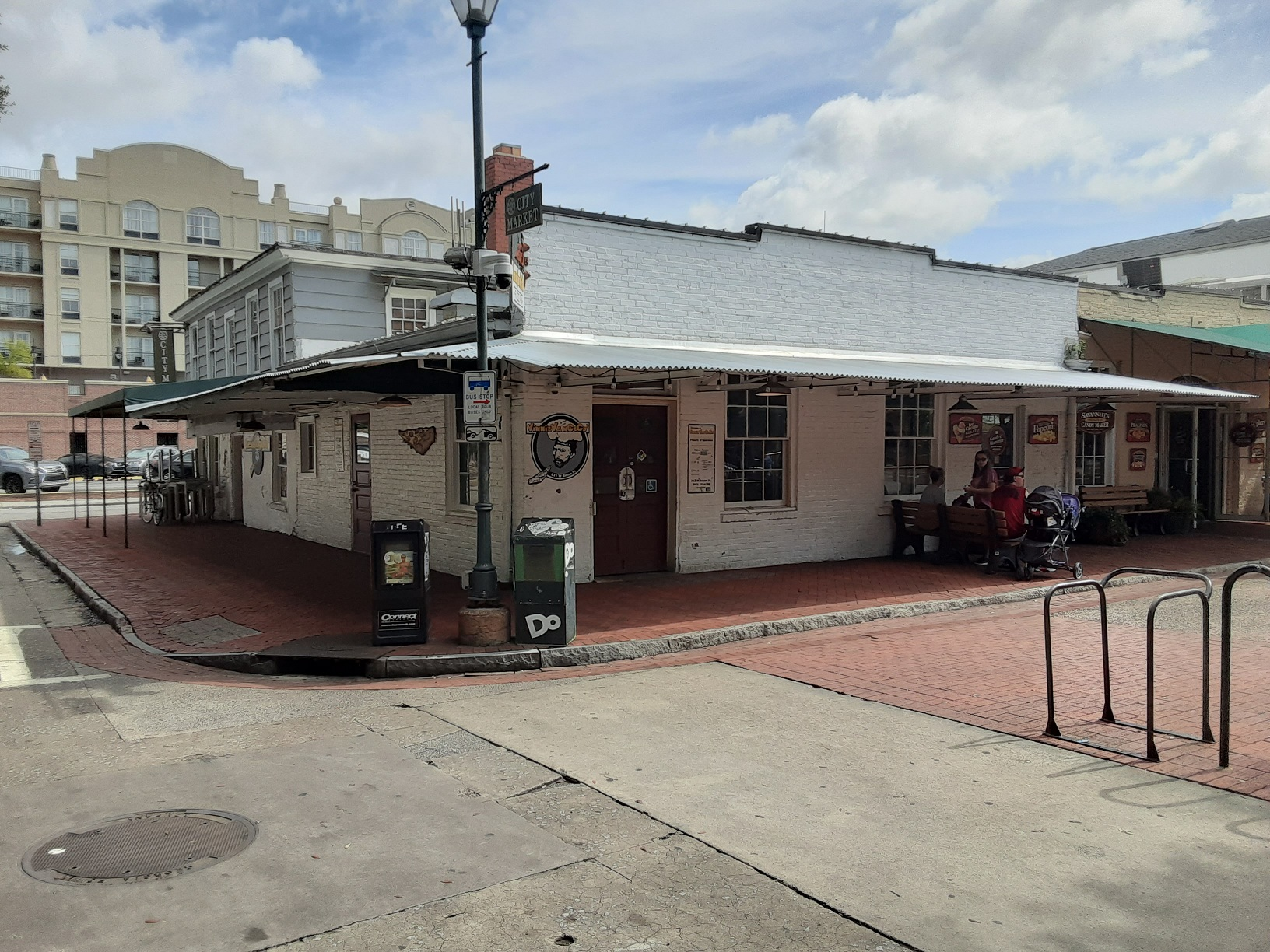
View from the end of West St. Julian Street (2021)

== See also ==
- Buildings in Savannah Historic District
