= Matthew E. Mason =

American historian and professor

Matthew E. Mason is an American historian specializing in the politics of slavery in the early American Republic. He is a professor at Brigham Young University.

Mason holds an undergrad degree from the University of Utah and his Ph.D. from the University of Maryland, College Park. One of the professors he studied under as a grad student was Ira Berlin. After completing his Ph.D. in 2002 he took a tenure track position as a professor of history at Eastern Michigan University. In the fall of 2003 he took a position as a professor of history at Brigham Young University. At BYU he has taught classes in American history, US Civil War History, the history of slavery in both the US and more broadly in Africa and the Atlantic World, a course on the history of Modern Britain and the course American Heritage. As of 2018 Mason reached the rank of full professor at BYU after previously being an associate professor and an assistant professor.

Mason and his wife Stacie are the parents of three daughters. Mason is a brother of the historian and religious studies scholar Patrick Q. Mason. Mason is a member of the Church of Jesus Christ of Latter-day Saints and has served in various callings in the church including as a stake mission president.

Mason has written two books Slavery and Politics in the Early Republic and Apostle of Union: A Political Biography of Edward Everett (2016). Slavery and Politics in the Early Republic focuses on why the Federalists came to oppose slavery and argues it was an early manifestation of political opposition to the power of slave owners. It was ground breaking in arguing that slavery had a significant role in US politics before the 1819 debate over the admission of Missouri as a state. >

Mason was also an editor (along with David Waldstreicher) of the 2017 book John Quincy Adams and the Politics of Slavery: Selections from the Diary. This work gives perspective on the change in thoughts on how to use political power to oppose slavery experienced by John Quincy Adams over time. Mason also edited the 2008 book Contesting Slavery: The Politics of Bondage and Freedom in the New American Nation with John Craig Hammond. In a review A. Glen Crothers argued that this was a truly high quality collection of essays on the subject. He also edited Massachusetts and the Civil War: The Commonwealth and National Disunion with Katheryn P. Viens and Conrad E. Wright which was published in 2015 and a new edition of Edward Kimber's The History of the Life and Adventures of Mr. Anderson edited with Nicholas Mason.

Mason has also been involved with the organization Historians Against Slavery, where he is a co-director. In this position he works to coordinate the efforts of activists and scholars to end modern forms of slavery and human trafficking.
