= Montgomery Street (Savannah, Georgia) =

Prominent street in Savannah, Georgia

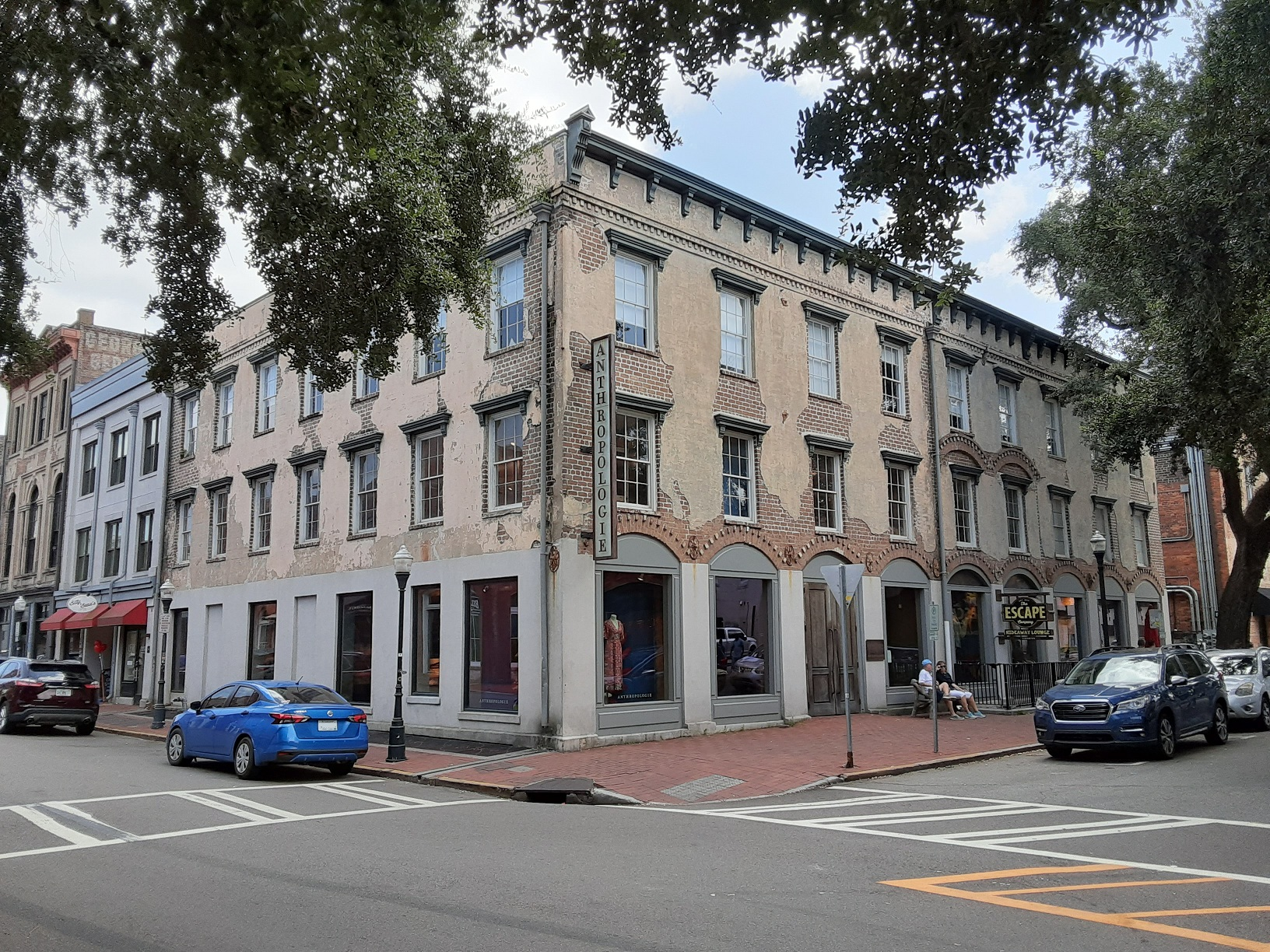
- Montgomery Street (right) at West Congress Street in 2021
- Namesake: Richard Montgomery
- Length: 4.21 mi (6.78 km)
- Location: Savannah, Georgia, U.S.
- North end: Williamson Street
- South end: Duncan Drive

Montgomery Street is a prominent street in Savannah, Georgia, United States. Located between Martin Luther King Jr. Boulevard to the west and Jefferson Street to the east, it runs for about 4.21 miles (6.78 km) from Williamson Street in the north to Duncan Drive in the south. The street is named for General Richard Montgomery, who served for the Continental Army in the American Revolutionary War. Its directional flow is one-way south of West Liberty Street. In March 2019, the formerly one-way section between West Broughton Street and West Liberty Street was converted to two-way, largely to permit visitors to turn right onto West Oglethorpe Avenue in order to drop people off at the entrance to the new Cultural Arts Center.

An off-ramp from Interstate 16, completed in 1967, merges onto Montgomery Street, after passing over Martin Luther King Jr. Boulevard and West Taylor Street.

The street's northern section passes through the Savannah Historic District, a National Historic Landmark District.

== Notable buildings and structures ==
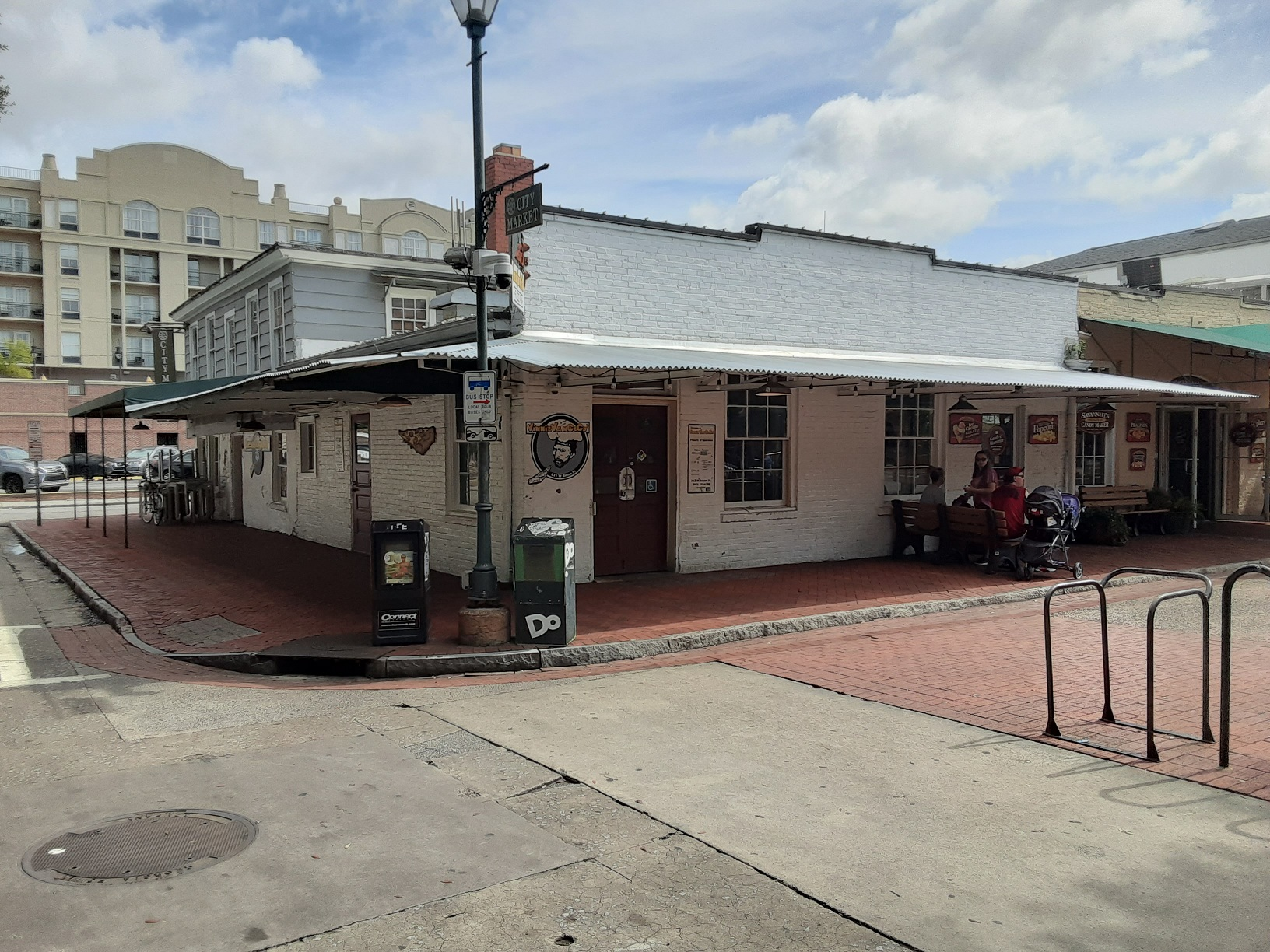
The Abram Minis Property in Franklin Square

Below is a selection of notable buildings and structures on Montgomery Street, all in Savannah's Historic District. From north to south:

- Abram Minis Property, 20–22 Montgomery Street (1846)
- First African Baptist Church, 23 Montgomery Street (1859–1861)
- George Hardcastle Building, 30–38 Montgomery Street (1855)
- 37–39 Montgomery Street (1916)
- Congregation B'nai B'rith (former site), 120 Montgomery Street (1908; now part of the Savannah College of Art and Design)
- James Hart Building, 144–146 Montgomery Street (1888)
- Michael Gay Property, 419–427 Montgomery Street (1854–1855)
- Bernard Graeffe Property, 602–604 Montgomery Street (1871)
- 619–621 Montgomery Street (1915)
- 624 Montgomery Street (1900)
