= Washington Baird =

American minister (1805–1868)

The Reverend Washington Baird
- Born: 1804; Fayette County, Pennsylvania, U.S.
- Died: July 25, 1868 (aged 63–64); Clayton County, Georgia, U.S.
- Resting place: Old Huie-Philadelphia Community Cemetery, Forest Park, Georgia, U.S.
- Occupation: Presbyterian minister
- Parent(s): James Baird; Mary Baird

Washington Baird (1804 – July 25, 1868) was an American Presbyterian minister. He was also a teacher and editor of Southern Presbyterian.

== Early life ==
Baird was born in 1804 in Fayette County, Pennsylvania, to "pious parents" James and Mary Baird. He was one of their thirteen children, born between 1789 and 1813, and their youngest son. His siblings were James, Margaret, Robinson, William, Joshua, Rachel, Elizabeth, John, James, Mary, Anne and Sarah. When he was very young, the family moved to Maysville, Kentucky, where Baird was prepared for college. He later returned to Pennsylvania to attend Jefferson College. He graduated in 1831.

== Career ==
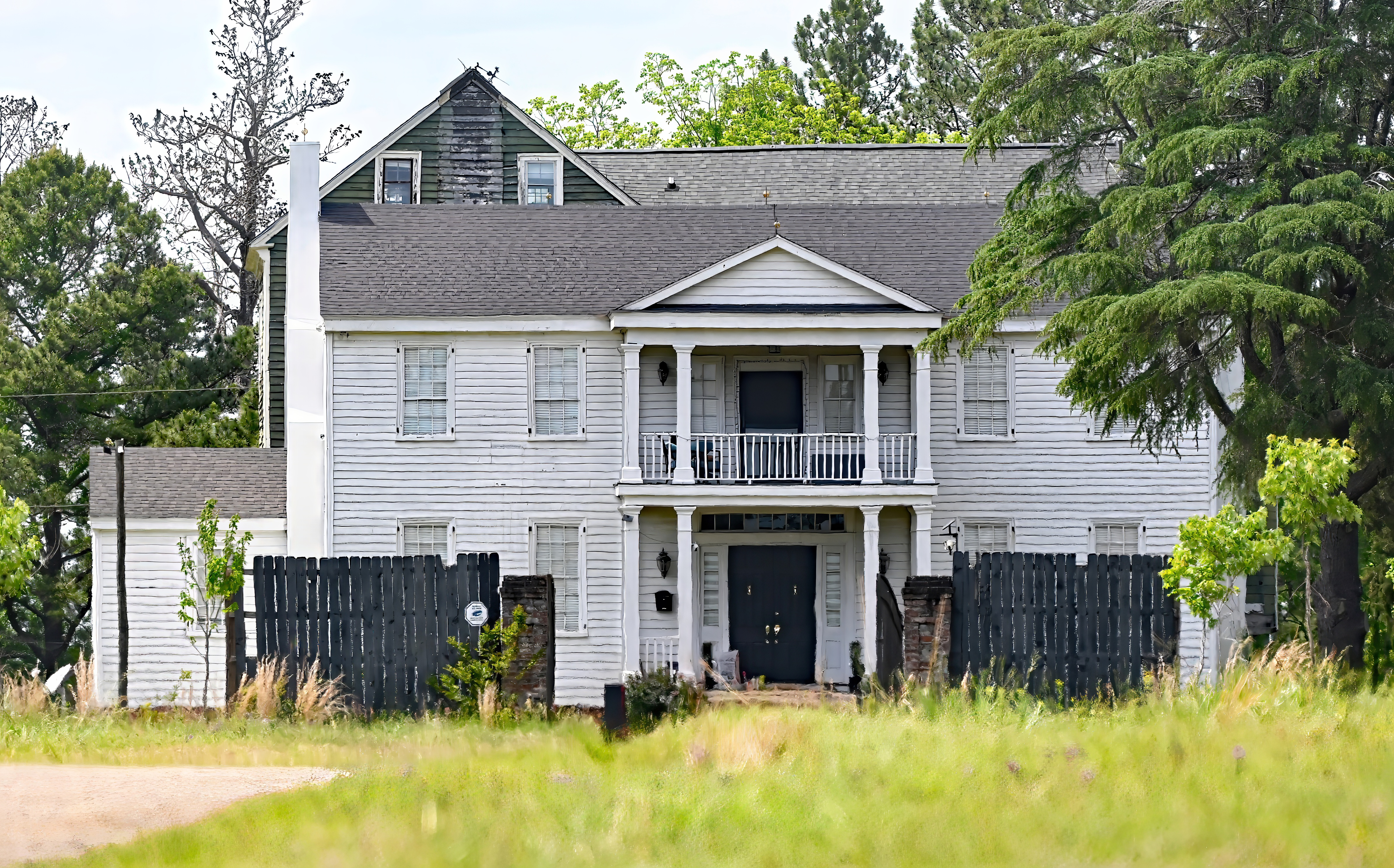
"Woodville", near Milledgeville, Georgia

In the early 1830s, Baird moved from Kentucky, to Scottsboro, Georgia, to lead its Male Academy. In 1832, he moved again, to Milledgeville, Georgia, at the request of Seaton Grantland, who asked Baird to privately tutor his children. Baird had visited Grantland's printing office to advertise for a school at which he could offer his services. The family school evolved into being a neighborhood school, based at Grantland's "Woodville" home, which he built in 1819.

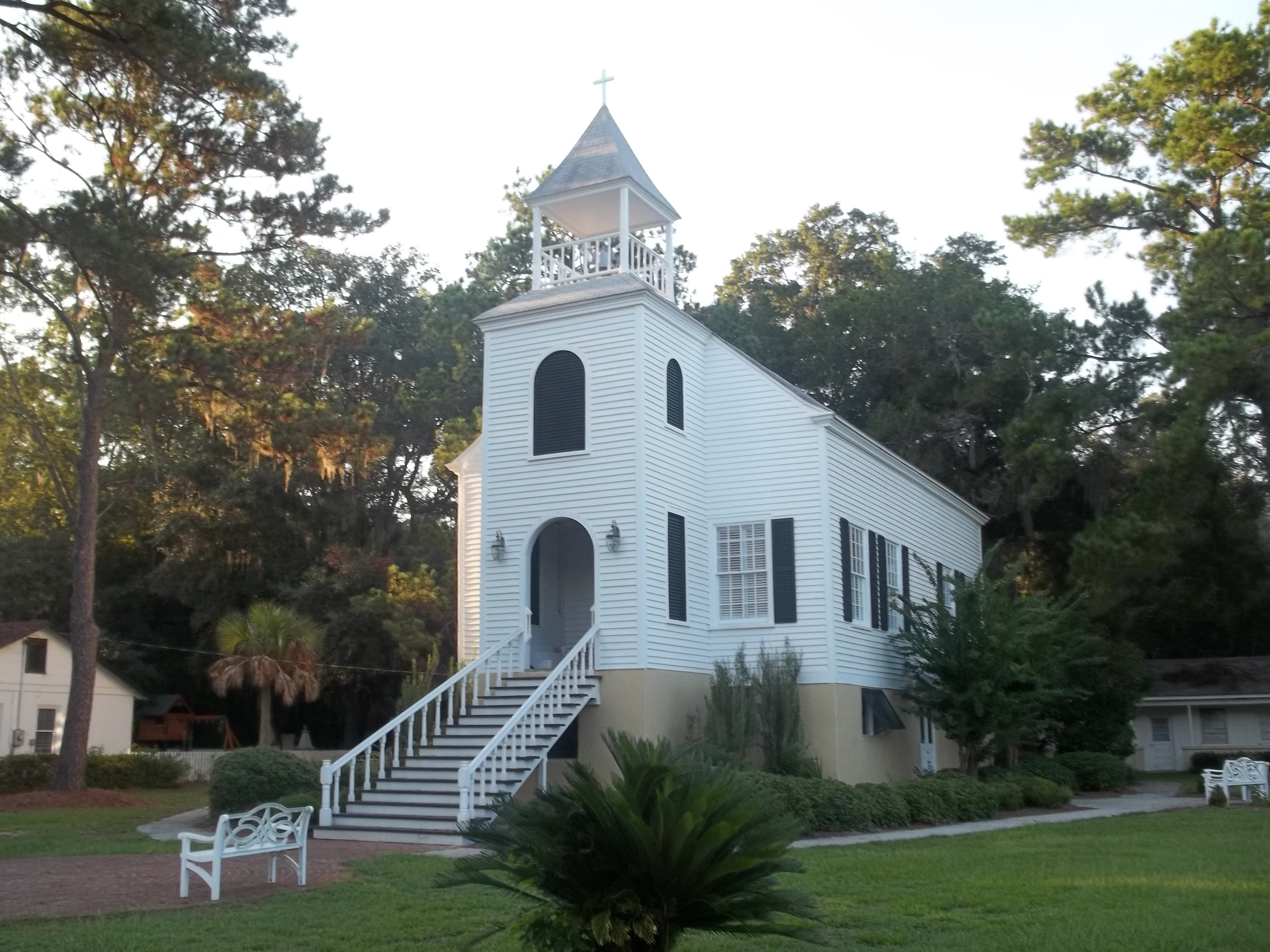
St. Marys First Presbyterian Church

Baird remained in Milledgeville for several years, until his growing reputation precipitated an invitation from Chatham Academy in Savannah, Georgia. He moved there and, outside of teaching, studied theology. He received advice and guidance from Reverend Willard Preston of Savannah's Independent Presbyterian Church.

He became licensed in the Presbytery of Charleston and moved to Waynesville, Georgia, to take charge of Waynesville and Linton Grove churches. In 1840, he became the pastor of St. Marys First Presbyterian Church in St. Marys, Georgia, where he also "conducted a flourishing school" alongside his ministerial responsibilities. He also made regular visits to East Florida for missionary work. He organized the Presbyterian Church of Jacksonville.

Baird was a pastor in Savannah between 1834 and 1837.

Upon returning to Milledgeville in 1847, he became the editor of Southern Presbyterian there and when it moved to Charleston, South Carolina. He was its proprietor until 1854.

In 1855, he became the pastor of the Presbyterian Church of Spartanburg, South Carolina. He also preached in Camden, Arkansas, in 1859.

During the American Civil War in 1863, he was sent to the Confederate General Assembly as a Commissioner. Vicksburg, Mississippi, was captured by Federal troops, thus breaking the connection between the East and West, which meant Baird could not return to Arkansas.

Baird returned to "Woodville", where Seaton Grantland welcomed him and provided accommodation. He was employed in preparing the Confederate Spelling Book, which was published in 1864, as well as in teaching Grantland's grandchildren, which included Fleming Grantland DuBignon.

In the spring of 1866, Baird moved to Griffin, Georgia, where he spent a year working as a tutor for the family of Mrs. Jack Bailey. While there, he became interested in the "destitute" churches of Butts and Clayton counties. In the spring of 1867, he was working in Philadelphia, before spending the fall in the Presbytery of Atlanta as a missionary, working in Butts, Henry, Clayton and Carroll counties.

== Death ==
Baird died at the home of Alexander L. Huie in 1868, aged 63 or 64, having been sick for around six weeks. He was interred in Old Huie-Philadelphia Community Cemetery in Forest Park, Georgia.

After his sympathy with the South, his family (except for an aunt) stopped corresponding with him, so it is not known if he married or had a family of his own.
