= Odette Tyler =

American actress and writer (1869–1936)

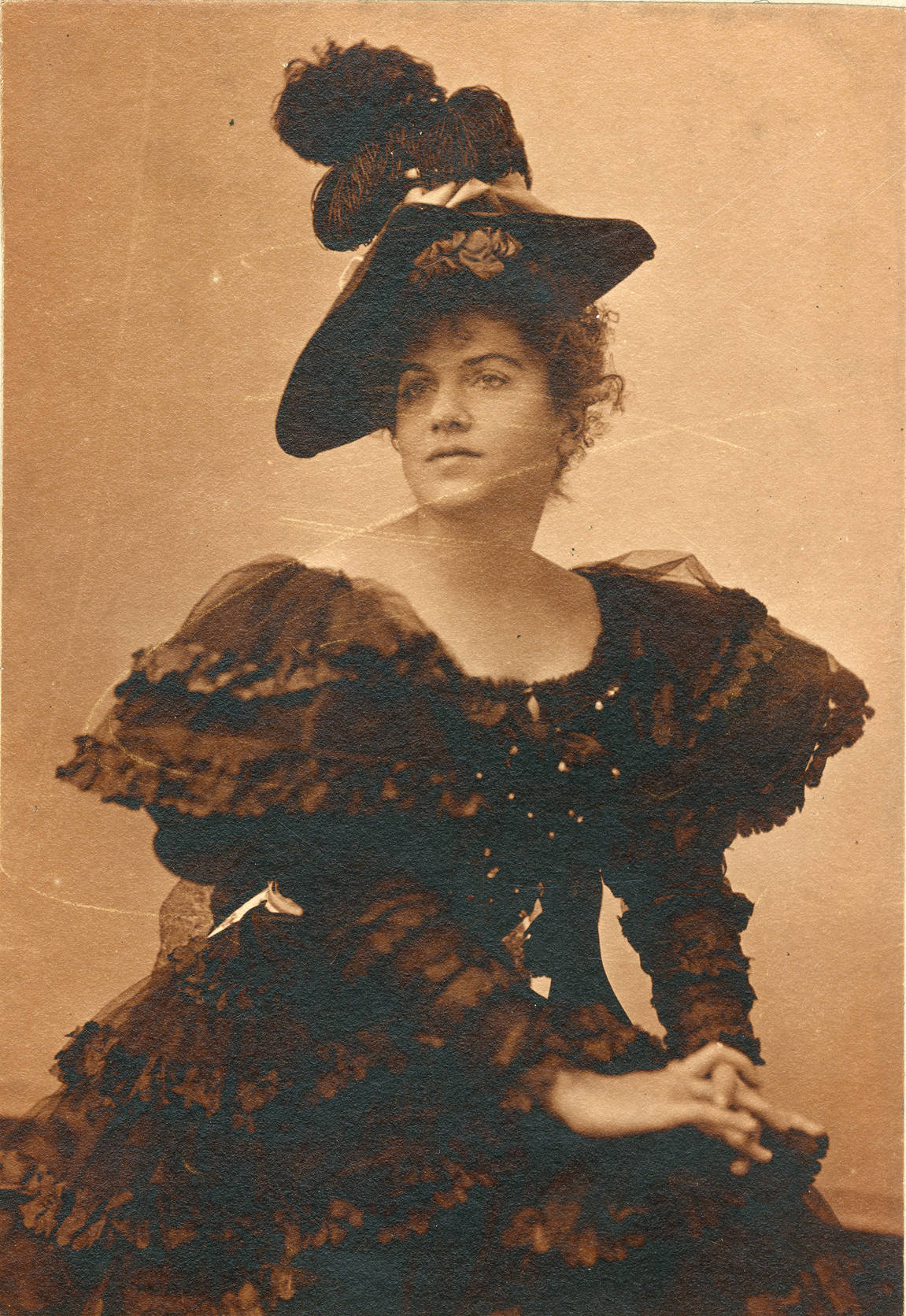
- Tyler in 1906
- Born: Elizabeth Lee Kirkland; September 26, 1869; Savannah, Georgia, U.S.
- Died: December 8, 1936 (aged 67); Los Angeles, California, U.S.
- Occupations: Actress, writer, arts patron
- Partner: Howard Gould (1894)
- Father: William Whedbee Kirkland
- Relatives: William J. Hardee (uncle); Hardee Kirkland (brother); Robert E. Lee (godfather)

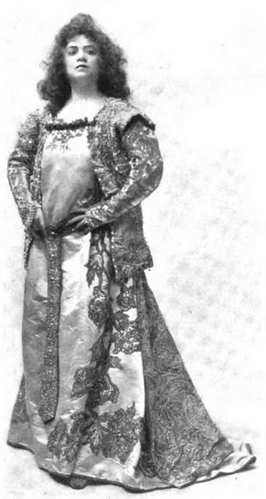
Odette Tyler, from a 1901 publication.

Elizabeth Lee Kirkland (September 26, 1869 – December 8, 1936) was an American actress, writer and arts patron known professionally as Odette Tyler.

== Early life and education ==
Elizabeth Lee Kirkland was born in Savannah, Georgia in 1869 (some sources give 1872), the daughter of William Whedbee Kirkland and Susan Ann Hardee Kirkland. Her father was a Confederate general in the American Civil War. Her maternal uncle William J. Hardee was also a Confederate general. Her older brother, Hardee Kirkland, was an actor and director in silent films. Robert E. Lee was her godfather.

Her education included time at a convent school in Georgetown and at the Loretto Convent in Guelph, Ontario.

== Career ==
Odette Tyler started her New York stage career in 1884, in Sieba, a spectacle. Her other theatrical appearances included roles in the shows The Private Secretary, In Spite of All, Featherbrain (1889), Men and Women (1890), Lost Paradise, The Councillor's Wife (1892), Shenandoah (1892), The Girl I Left Behind Me (1893), The Younger Son (1893), Poor Girls (1894), The Man Upstairs (1895), The Gay Parisians (1895), William Hooker Gillette's Secret Service (1896, in London 1897), Phroso (1899), The Heart of Maryland (1905), The Love Route (1906), It Happened in Dixie (1914). She acted in several Shakespearean roles, including Desdemona, Juliet, and Portia, and roles in Coriolanus and King John. In 1906, she headed her own stock company. She appeared in one silent film, The Saphead (1920).

Tyler wrote a novel, Boss: A Story of Virginia Life, published in 1895. "It is quite as good as most novels that are printed," noted the New York Times reviewer. She later adapted Boss for the screen. She also wrote a play, Red Carnation, which she starred in with her second husband in 1905. Months before she died in 1936, she directed a play in Los Angeles.

As Elizabeth Lee Shepherd, she was a patron of the arts in Los Angeles. She was one of the organizers of the Los Angeles Philharmonic Orchestra, and of the women's wing of the Los Angeles Grand Opera Association. She also chaired the city's Shakespeare Foundation, and worked toward the building of a theatre dedicated to productions of Shakespeare plays.

== Personal life ==
In 1883, when she was age 14, Odette Tyler married Edgar P. Crissman; they divorced. In 1894, she was engaged to marry wealthy Howard Gould, but both of their families objected, and the engagement was broken. She married fellow actor R.D. MacLean (also known as Rezin Davis Shepherd, and Donald MacLean Shepherd) in 1897. The couple moved to California in 1919 for R.D. MacLean's film career. Odette Tyler died of heart attack in 1936 in Los Angeles.
