= Reminiscences of Charles Seton Henry Hardee =

Memoir published in 1928

- Author: Charles Seton Henry Hardee
- Language: English
- Genre: History
- Publication date: 1928 (98 years ago)
- Publication place: United States
- Pages: 131

Reminiscences of Charles Seton Henry Hardee is a memoir by 19th- and 20th-century historian Charles Seton Henry Hardee, published in 1928. This, and Hardee's second memoir, Charles Seton Henry Hardee's Recollections of Old Savannah, were published by Hardee's granddaughter, Martha Gallaudet Waring, after his death. The books became noted works on the history of the early years of Savannah, Georgia, "preserving for us many interesting scenes and memories of a day gone forever, but that help to interpret our inheritance to us." His manuscript was accurate due to his verification of any subject he did not feel completely sure about.

Hardee died at his desk in 1927, aged 97, during the writing of the second volume. "His pencil did not drop from his weary fingers. His notebook lay on his table, ready for further recollections of the development of his beloved city," wrote his granddaughter.
