= 21st North Carolina Infantry Regiment =

Infantry regiment of the Confederate States Army

- Active: 1861–1865
- Country: Confederate States of America
- Allegiance: North Carolina
- Branch: Confederate States Army
- Type: Infantry
- Engagements: American Civil War: Battle of First Manassas; First Battle of Winchester; Battle of Roanoke Island; Battle of Antietam; Battle of Fredericksburg; Battle of Chancellorsville; Battle of Gettysburg; Battle of Appomattox Court House

Commanders
- Notable commanders: William Whedbee Kirkland; Robert Hoke

The 21st North Carolina Infantry Regiment was an infantry unit raised by the state of North Carolina for service in the Confederate States Army during the American Civil War.

== History ==
Originally organized as the 11th North Carolina Volunteers, the regiment was organized at Danville, Virginia, in early June 1861, with William Whedbee Kirkland elected colonel. It departed Danville on July 15, arriving in Richmond, Virginia that evening, and was ordered on July 17 to join General P. G. T. Beauregard's forces at Manassas, Virginia. Arriving at Mitchell's Ford on July 18, the unit occupied the center of the Confederate line. Although shelled, it saw no direct combat during the First Battle of Manassas on July 21, after which it participated in the pursuit of retreating Federal forces. Following the battle, the regiment encamped on Bull Run, where disease took a heavy toll. In September it was moved to Broad Run Station to recuperate and by October occupied winter quarters at Manassas as part of Brigadier General Isaac R. Trimble's brigade.

The regiment was redesignated the 21st North Carolina Infantry (State Troops) on November 14, 1861, following an order from North Carolina Adjutant General James Green Martin. The reorganization was not formally completed until April 26, 1862, after the expiration of the original enlistment terms for the volunteer companies. Some men returned home, while others reenlisted for the duration of the war.

The regiment performed picket duty during the winter of 1861–1862. In March 1862, it moved to Gordonsville, Virginia, and was soon ordered into the Shenandoah Valley, where it joined Major General Thomas J. "Stonewall" Jackson's command. The 21st North Carolina participated in Jackson's 1862 Valley Campaign, including the First Battle of Winchester on May 25, where the regiment took part in a direct assault on Federal positions and suffered heavy casualties.

Following this engagement, the regiment fought in several additional battles in the Valley, including Harrisonburg (Good's Farm), Cross Keys, and Port Republic. It received commendation from Trimble for its conduct. The unit then joined Jackson's forces in the Seven Days Battles near Richmond, contributing to the Confederate advance that forced Union General George B. McClellan's retreat to the James River.

The regiment continued to serve in Jackson's command during the Northern Virginia campaign, engaging at Cedar Mountain and in the decisive battles at Manassas (August 28–30, 1862). During the fighting at Manassas, the 21st helped repel multiple Federal assaults and suffered significant losses. Its commanding officer, Colonel Saunders Fulton, was killed on August 30. The unit fought again at the Battle of Chantilly on September 1, 1862, where Union Major General Philip Kearny was killed.

In the Maryland Campaign, the regiment participated in the capture of Harper's Ferry before fighting at Antietam on September 17. It then engaged at the Battle of Fredericksburg on December 13, 1862, where it helped repel a Federal breakthrough near Hamilton's Crossing. Colonel Robert Hoke, who commanded the brigade, was promoted to brigadier general shortly thereafter.

In May 1863, the regiment fought at the Battle of Chancellorsville, helping flank Union forces under Major General John Sedgwick. It then marched north during the Gettysburg campaign, participating in the capture of Winchester and Martinsburg, and saw heavy action at the Battle of Gettysburg on July 1–2. The regiment took part in assaults against fortified Union positions and suffered severe casualties, including the loss of nearly all its field officers. The regiment's battle flag was lost during the fighting on July 2.

In 1864, the 21st North Carolina participated in the successful Confederate assault on Plymouth, North Carolina, from April 17–20, contributing to the capture of the town and garrison. It then fought at New Bern and Drewry's Bluff, and later at the Battle of Cold Harbor on June 3, where it helped repel Union General Ulysses S. Grant's attacks. The regiment also fought in the defense of Lynchburg and in the 1864 Valley Campaigns, including engagements at Monocacy (July 9), Fort Stevens (July 12), Winchester (September 19), Fisher's Hill (September 21), and Cedar Creek (October 19), where it suffered further losses, including the death of Major William J. Pfohl and the mortal wounding of Major General Stephen D. Ramseur.

During the final months of the war, the regiment served around Petersburg, Virginia, engaging in combat at the Battle of Hatcher's Run (February 6, 1865) and in the assault on Fort Stedman (March 25, 1865). The 21st North Carolina took part in the retreat from Petersburg and fought several rearguard actions before being present at the surrender of the Army of Northern Virginia at Appomattox Court House on April 9, 1865.

== North Carolina Sharpshooters ==
The 1st North Carolina Battalion Sharpshooters, also known as the 9th Battalion, was formed in May 1862 at Gordonsville, Virginia. It was composed of two companies drawn from the 21st North Carolina Infantry Regiment, with personnel primarily from Yadkin and Forsyth counties. Initially part of the 21st Regiment, the battalion took part in Jackson's Valley Campaign before being officially assigned to the brigades of Generals Trimble, Hoke, and Robert Daniel Johnston. It participated in numerous engagements with the Army of Northern Virginia, from the Seven Days' Battles through the Mine Run Campaign. During the winter of 1863–1864, the unit was stationed in North Carolina and took part in the capture of Plymouth. It later returned to Virginia and saw action at Drewry's Bluff and Cold Harbor, then joined General Jubal Early's operations in the Shenandoah Valley before contributing to the Appomattox Campaign. The battalion reported 9 casualties at Gaines' Mill and Malvern Hill, 11 on the Rappahannock, 15 at Groveton, and 11 at Chancellorsville. At the time of its surrender, the unit consisted of 3 officers and 65 men, of whom 46 were armed.
