= Rifle and Light Infantry Tactics =

1855 book by William J. Hardee

Rifle and Light Infantry Tactics; for Exercise and Maneuvres of Troops when acting as Light Infantry or Riflemen is a book written by William J. Hardee in 1855. Its purpose was to act as a guide for commissioned officers in the instruction of their command.

== Publication ==
In 1853, then-Secretary of War Jefferson Davis ordered Hardee to write an updated manual on the use and tactics of the new weapons available, percussion rifles, which would be used throughout the Civil War. The book was finished by 1855, and became the standard manual on March 20 of that year. The manual has had multiple different prints, the most common of which being in 1861 and 1862. At that time, Hardee had joined the Confederate Army and held the rank of lieutenant general. The manual was in use with the United States Army as well as the Confederate States Army during the war.
