= Vera; or, The Nihilists =

1883 play by Oscar Wilde

- Original language: English
- Written by: Oscar Wilde
- Genre: Tragedy
- Setting: Russia, 1800

Premiere
- Date: 20 August 1883
- Place: Union Square Theatre, New York, US

Vera; or, The Nihilists is a play by Oscar Wilde. It is a tragedy set in Russia and is loosely based on the life of Vera Zasulich. It was Wilde's first play, and the first to be performed. A draft of the script was completed in 1880 and the following year arrangements were made for a one-off staging in London with Mrs. Bernard-Beere in the title role, but the production was cancelled. The first performance was in 1883 at New York’s Union Square Theatre, and was based on revisions made by Wilde while lecturing in America in 1882. The play, which starred Marie Prescott as Vera, was not a success and folded after only one week. It is rarely revived.

== Production history ==
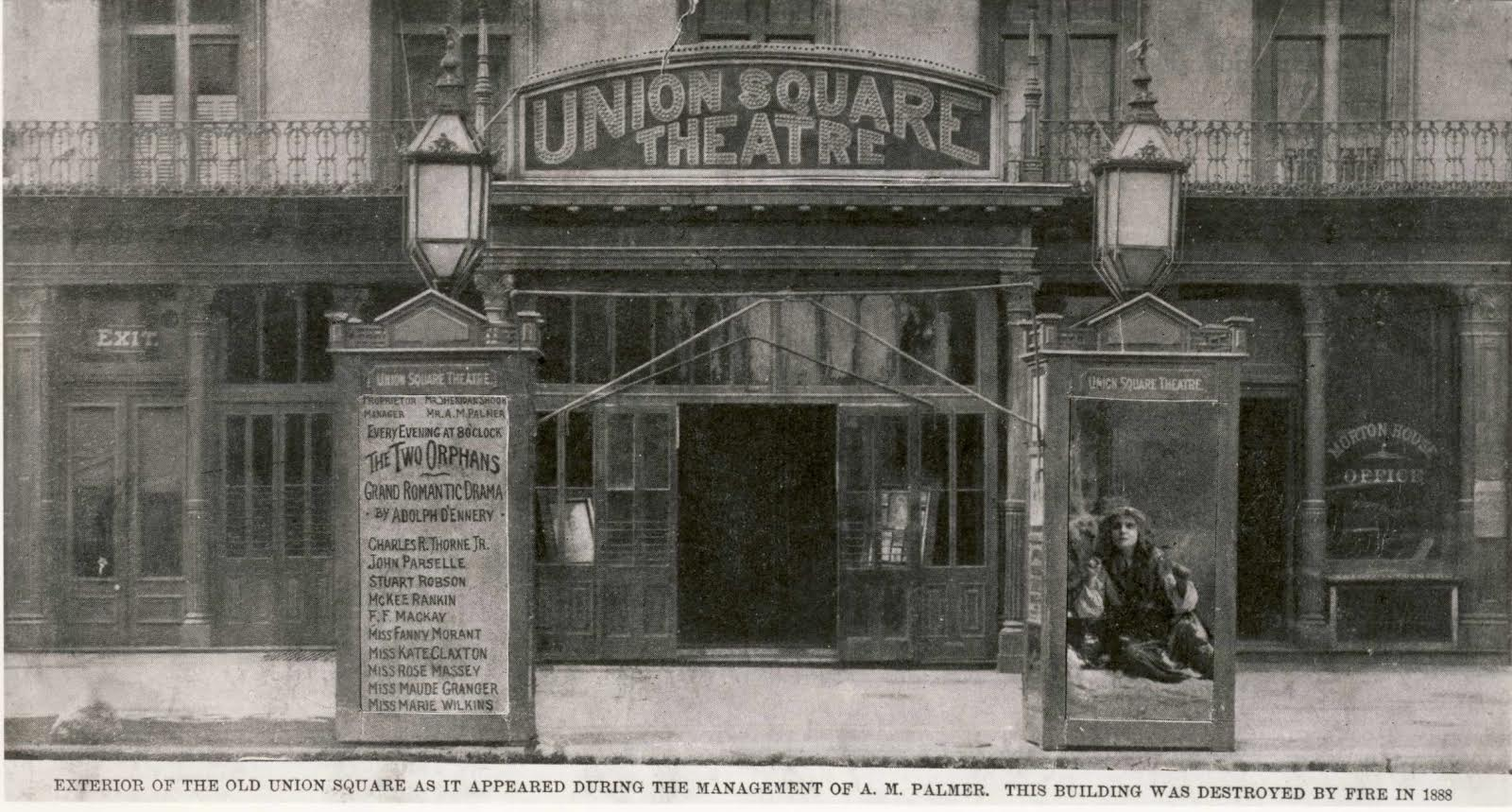
Image of the original Union Square Theatre in New York. This building burnt down in 1888 and is not to be confused with the modern Union Square Theatre.

At the time of writing, the reform-minded Tsar Alexander II was involved in a struggle with revolutionaries who sought to assassinate him (and eventually succeeded). Though none of Wilde's characters correspond to actual Russian people of the time, the above situation was well-known both to Wilde and to the audience for which he was writing. It has been suggested that the plot was inspired by true events. In 1878, three years before the play's completion, Vera Zasulich shot the Governor of St Petersburg, Trepov. Wilde described himself as a Socialist, although Ellmann describes his Socialism as more "a general hatred of tyranny" than a specific political belief.

Marie Prescott and her husband William Perzel purchased the rights to perform the play, and Prescott was the leading actress in its first performance at the Union Square Theatre on 20 August 1883. Wilde travelled to America for the second time in his life specifically to oversee the production.

The play was withdrawn after one week. Perzel told newspaper reporters that "the play is withdrawn simply because it did not pay," adding that he had lost $2,500 on the piece the previous week. He also implied that he had hoped Wilde himself would lecture between the acts, allowing him to capitalise on Wilde's popularity as a public speaker.

== Plot ==
=== Dramatis Personae ===
PERSONS IN THE PROLOGUE.

- Peter Sabouroff (an Innkeeper).
- Vera Sabouroff (his Daughter).
- Michael (a Peasant).
- Dmitri Sabouroff.
- Colonel Kotemkin.

PERSONS IN THE PLAY.

- Ivan the Czar.
- Prince Paul Maraloffski (Prime Minister of Russia).
- Prince Petrovitch.
- Count Rouvaloff.
- Marquis de Poivrard.
- Baron Raff.
- General Kotemkin.
- A Page.
- A Colonel of the Guard.

Nihilists.

- Peter Tchernavitch, President of the Nihilists.
- Michael.
- Alexis Ivanacievitch, known as a Student of Medicine.
- Professor Marfa.
- Vera Sabouroff.

Soldiers, Conspirators, &c.

=== Prologue ===
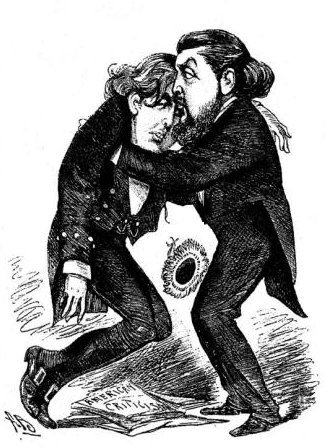
"Brother Willie- "Never mind, Oscar; other great men have had their dramatic failures!" 1883 cartoon by Alfred Bryan after the failure of Oscar Wilde's play Vera; or, The Nihilists in America

Vera is a barmaid in her father's tavern, which is situated along a road to the prison camps in Siberia. A gang of prisoners stop at the tavern. Vera immediately recognises her brother Dmitri as one of the prisoners. He begs her to go to Moscow and join the Nihilists, a terrorist group trying to assassinate the Czar, and avenge his imprisonment. She and her father's manservant Michael leave to join the Nihilists.

=== Act I ===
Five years later, Vera has become the Nihilists' top assassin, and is wanted across Europe. She is in love with a fellow Nihilist named Alexis: however, Nihilists are sworn never to marry. A Nihilist meeting is nearly broken up by soldiers, but Alexis thwarts the soldiers by revealing his true identity: he is the Tsarevich, heir to the Russian throne. This act earns him the further admiration of Vera and the hatred of the Nihilists.

=== Act II ===
At a council meeting, Tsar Ivan and his cruel epigrammatic minister Prince Paul Maraloffski criticise Tsarevitch Alexis's democratic leanings, but the Tsar is assassinated by Michael after the Tsarevitch opens the window.

=== Act III ===
Alexis ascends the throne and exiles Prince Paul Maraloffski, not to Siberia, but to Paris. Maraloffski joins the Nihilists to kill Alexis. The task of assassinating the Tsar is given to Vera. She must infiltrate the palace, stab the Tsar and throw the dagger out the window as a signal to Nihilist agents below. If she does not, the agents will break in and kill him. Vera is reluctant to kill the man she loves, though.

=== Act IV ===
Alexis returns to the palace after his coronation, intending to end injustice in Russia during his reign. Vera enters the palace, knife at the ready. Alexis asks her to marry him. She accepts, but then she hears the agents outside crying out for the signal. She stabs herself and throws the dagger out the window, and the agents depart satisfied.

Alexis: Vera, what have you done?
Vera: I have saved Russia. [dies]

== Critical reception ==
The play’s original reception was mostly critical.

Reviewing the first production, the New York Mirror described it as "among the highest order of plays," "masterly," and "the noblest contribution to its literature the stage has received in many years". Other newspapers reviews were very critical: "Long-drawn dramatic rot" (New York Herald), "wearisome" (New York Times), and "little better than fizzle" (New York Tribune). Punch printed that it was "from all accounts, except the Poet's own, Vera Bad". Pilot, meanwhile, complimented the script, and laid blame on Prescott as an "inferior actress".

Since its original production, Vera has been very rarely revived. In 1987, Wilde's biographer Richard Ellmann described Vera as "a wretched play," yet noted that "it did not fall disastrously below the standard set by drama in a century when, as Stendhal said, plays could not be written."

Scenes from the play were featured in the HBO drama, The Gilded Age, season 2, episode 3, "Head to Head".

A full-length revival of the play (the first of its kind) was staged in London in 2025 and attracted significant critical acclaim, with the Wildean magazine calling it "almost certainly the most effective production of the play ever mounted"; the run was a sellout success.
