= William Whedbee Kirkland =

Brigadier general in the Confederate States Army

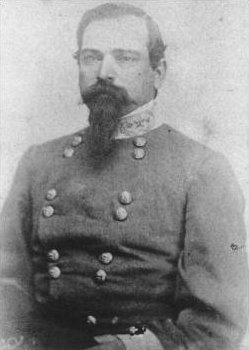
- Born: February 13, 1833; Hillsboro, North Carolina
- Died: May 12, 1915 (aged 82); Washington, D.C.
- Burial place: Elmwood Cemetery; Shepherdstown, West Virginia
- Military career
- Allegiance: United States of America; Confederate States of America
- Branch: United States Marine Corps; Confederate States Army
- Service years: 1855–1860 (USMC); 1861–1865 (CSA)
- Rank: Second Lieutenant (USMC); Brigadier General (CSA)
- Commands: 11th North Carolina; 21st North Carolina; Pettigrew-Kirkland-MacRae Brigade
- Conflicts: Second Opium War: Battle of the Barrier Forts; American Civil War: First Manassas; 1862 Shenandoah Valley Campaign; Murfreesboro Campaign; Gettysburg campaign; Battle of Bristoe Station; Overland Campaign; Battle of Bentonville

William Whedbee Kirkland (February 13, 1833 – May 12, 1915) was a brigadier general in the Confederate States Army during the American Civil War. He was the only former US Marine to serve as a Confederate general.

== Early life ==
Kirkland was born in Hillsborough, Orange County, North Carolina. He was appointed to the United States Military Academy in 1852, but did not graduate. Despite this failure, he was commissioned as a Second Lieutenant in the United States Marine Corps in 1855. In 1856 he participated in the Battle of the Barrier Forts. He resigned his commission in 1860.

== Civil War ==
When the Civil War broke out, Kirkland was initially appointed a captain in the Confederate army and then elected colonel of the 11th North Carolina Volunteers, later designated the 21st North Carolina Infantry Regiment, in June 1861. He commanded his regiment at First Manassas as part of Brig. Gen Milledge Bonham's brigade, but was not significantly engaged. In October, the 21st North Carolina was attached to Isaac Trimble's brigade and the following spring, he participated in Stonewall Jackson's Shenandoah Valley Campaign. Kirkland was shot through both thighs during the First Battle of Winchester, putting him out of action for several months. During his recuperation, Kirkland served as chief of staff for Patrick Cleburne during the Murfreesboro campaign in December 1862.

Kirkland returned to active service with his old regiment at the Battle of Gettysburg, taking part during the fighting on July 1–2. He was promoted to brigadier general on August 31, to rank from August 29, and commanded the former brigade of J. Johnston Pettigrew at the Battle of Bristoe Station, where the ulnar bone of his left arm was fractured by a bullet. He spent the next few months recuperating and in February 1864 returned to duty. He fought in the Battle of the Wilderness and the Battle of Spotsylvania Courthouse before being wounded again at the Battle of Cold Harbor, when he was once again shot in the right thigh. Kirkland was assigned to the command of another brigade in Robert F. Hoke's division the following August.

Kirkland served under James Longstreet at Richmond, taking part in the attack on Fort Harrison in October 1864. Transferred to North Carolina in December, Kirkland assisted in the defense of Fort Fisher by forcing back the Federal advance under the command of Benjamin Butler. Later, when the Confederates abandoned the fort and withdrew to Wilmington, he commanded the rear guard and directed events in the fighting at Wise's Fork. He fought at Bentonville and surrendered with Joseph E. Johnston on April 26, 1865 in Durham, North Carolina.

After the war, Kirkland settled in Savannah, Georgia, where he worked in the commission business as partner of Noble Hardee, the father of his wife Susan Ann. He later moved to New York City and worked for the post office there. Kirkland spent the last years of his life in a soldier's home in Washington, D.C., where he died of kidney disease on May 12, 1915, and was buried in Elmwood Cemetery in Shepherdstown, West Virginia.

Kirkland's daughter Bess became famous on the Broadway stage under the name Odette Tyler. His family home, Ayr Mount, in Hillsborough, NC, is now a house museum.

== See also ==
- List of American Civil War generals (Confederate)
