= John Hais Hardee Sr. =

Colonel in the Continental Army

Colonel John Hais Hardee Sr.
- Born: November 4, 1747; Beaufort County, North Carolina
- Died: April 3, 1809 (aged 61); Camden County, Georgia, U.S.
- Burial place: Hull Cemetery, Camden County, Georgia, U.S.

John Hais Hardee Sr. (November 4, 1747 – April 3, 1809) was an American military officer and planter who served in the Continental Army during the American Revolutionary War. Initially a private, he was promoted to colonel. In recognition of his services, the State of Georgia granted him 1,360 acres (550 ha) of land in Camden County in 1786, on which he built the Rural Felicity Plantation.

== Early life and career ==
Hardee was born in 1747 in Beaufort County, North Carolina, to John H. Hardee and Susannah Tyson. His father, the son of Anthony Hardee and Evelyn Dulverton, was one of the founders of Pitt County, and was also colonel in the American Revolutionary War. He married Caroline T. Aldrich, firstly, in 1770, then Elizabeth Burney. One of his children was John Hais Hardee Jr., who became a major in the United States Army during the War of 1812.

== Death ==
Hardee died in 1809 in Camden County, Georgia, aged 61. He was interred in the family burial ground at the Rural Felicity Plantation.
