= Fleming Grantland DuBignon =

American lawyer (1853–1909)

Personal details
- Born: July 25, 1853 Milledgeville, Georgia, U.S.
- Died: November 19, 1909 (aged 56) Atlanta, Georgia, U.S.
- Resting place: Laurel Grove Cemetery, Savannah, Georgia, U.S.
- Spouse: Caroline Nicoll Lamar (m. 1874–1909; his death)
- Relations: Seaton Grantland (grandfather)
- Education: University of Virginia
- Occupation: Lawyer

Fleming Grantland DuBignon (July 25, 1853 – November 19, 1909) was an American lawyer who was eminent in Savannah, Georgia.

== Early life ==
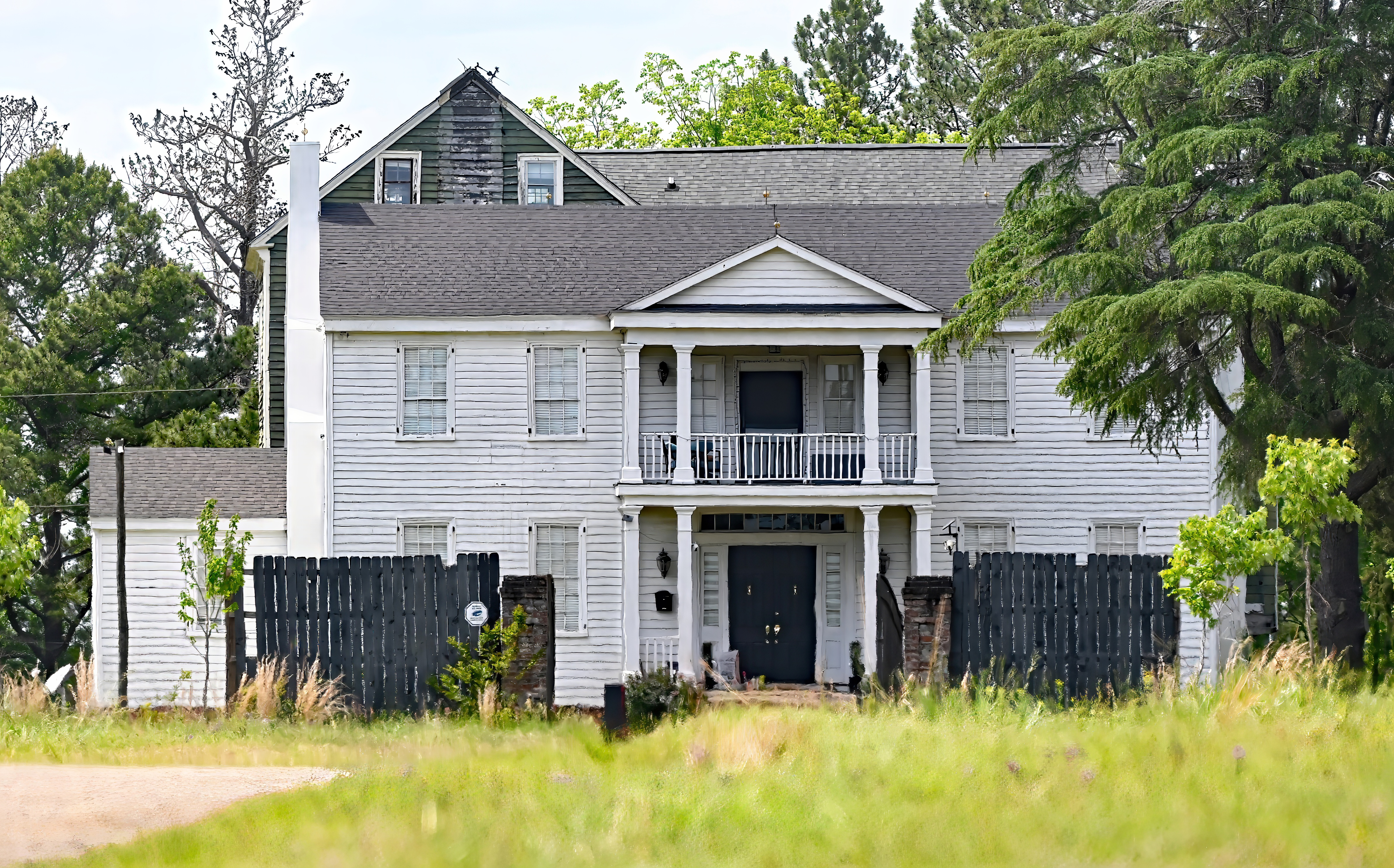
"Woodville," DuBignon's birthplace, pictured 170 years later

DuBignon was born in 1853 at "Woodville," near Milledgeville, Georgia, to Charles DuBignon Sr. and Ann Virginia Grantland. He was their fourth child of five, following Charles, Seaton and Kate and before Christopher. His maternal grandfather was Seaton Grantland, United States Congressman.

He was privately tutored in Milledgeville by Reverend Washington Baird (1804–1868), a Pennsylvania native, who was asked by Seaton Grantland to relocate to teach his children.

After receiving a military education at Virginia Military Institute in Lexington, Virginia (class of 1871), DuBignon graduated from the University of Virginia.

== Career ==
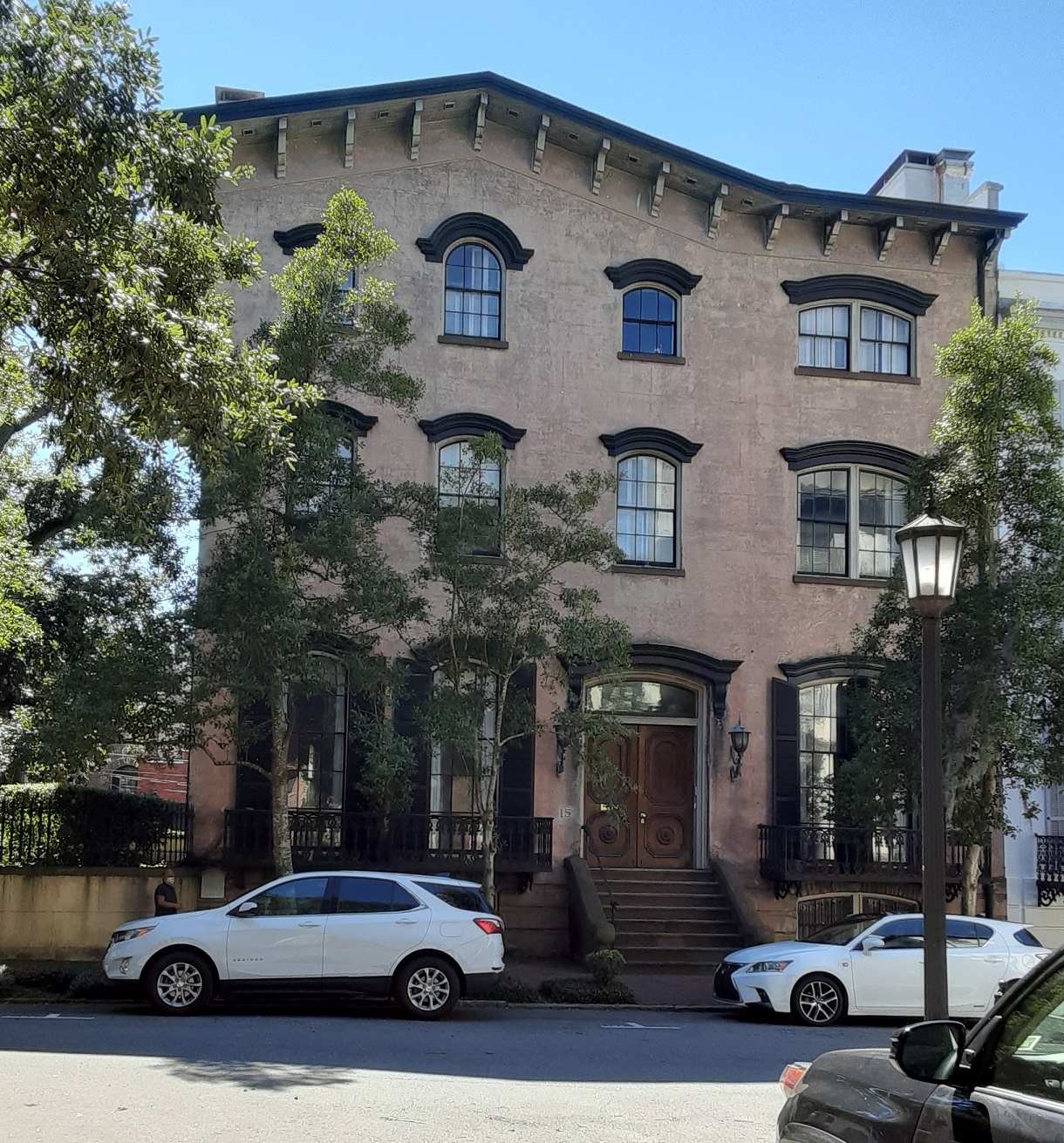
DuBignon's home in Savannah, Georgia

After being admitted to the bar, in 1876 DuBignon formed a law partnership with R. Whitfield and, later, with A. McKinley.

Between 1875 and 1877, DuBignon served as Judge of the County Court of Baldwin County, Georgia. In 1880 and 1881, he represented the county in the Georgia House of Representatives, followed that as a member of the Georgia State Senate, and then in 1883 he moved to Savannah, Georgia. He lived with his family at 15 West Perry Street.

In 1884, he would be elected President of the Georgia State Senate. Ill-health prevented him receiving the nomination for Governor of Georgia in 1901.

In 1889 DuBignon joined fellow attorneys Robert G. Erwin and Walter S. Chisholm Jr. to create Chisholm, Erwin & DuBignon. The 1890 death of senior partner Walter S. Chisholm Sr. the name shuffled to Erwin, DuBignon & Chisholm. William L. Clay joined the partnership in 1892.

In 1903 DuBignon formed a partnership with his son-in-law Robert Cotten Alston to create DuBignon & Alston. Alston had married DuBignon's daughter, Caro, in 1900. The partnership was dissolved when DuBignon fell into poor health.

== Personal life ==
In 1874, DuBignon married Caroline Nicoll Lamar, daughter of Colonel Augustus Lafayette Lamar, with whom he had four children between 1876 and 1881: Caro, Anne, Charles and Mary. Caro wrote a profile of her mother, who was nicknamed "Old Miss", which was printed in History of Baldwin County (1925).

DuBignon had constructed a two-story brick home on Peachtree Street in Atlanta, Georgia. It was demolished in 1954.

== Death ==
DuBignon died in Atlanta in 1909, aged 56. He was interred in Savannah's Laurel Grove Cemetery. His widow survived him by seven years, and lies beside him following her death at aged 61.
