= Robert G. Erwin =

American lawyer (1854–1906)

Personal details
- Born: May 6, 1854 Savannah, Georgia, U.S.
- Died: November 13, 1906 (aged 52) Old Saybrook, Connecticut, U.S.
- Resting place: Cedar Hill Cemetery, Hartford, Connecticut, U.S.
- Spouse: Julia Henrietta Munro Rogers (m. –1906; his death)
- Education: Trinity College
- Occupation: Lawyer

Robert Gallaudet Erwin (May 6, 1854 – January 13, 1906) was an American lawyer who was eminent in Savannah, Georgia.

== Early life ==
Erwin was born in 1854 in Savannah, Georgia, to Robert Erwin and Margaret Gallaudet, sister-in-law of Charles Seton Henry Hardee, a noted historian in the city. Erwin Sr. formed a law partnership, Erwin and Hardee, with Hardee in 1859, two years before the outbreak of the American Civil War.

Erwin graduated from Trinity College in Hartford, Connecticut, in 1874.

== Career ==
In the mid-1870s, Erwin studied law in the Savannah office of Hartridge & Chisholm. He was admitted to the bar in 1875. Three years later, he formed a partnership, titled Mackall & Erwin, with William W. Mackall. In 1879, following the death of Hartridge, the firm added Walter S. Chisholm to become Chisholm & Erwin. This partnership lasted until 1889, when Fleming Grantland DuBignon and Walter S. Chisholm Jr. joined, becoming Chisholm, Erwin & DuBignon. After the death of Chisholm Sr., the firm's senior member, in 1890, the firm name switched to become Erwin, DuBignon & Chisholm. William L. Clay joined the partnership in 1892.

The Chisholm and Erwin iteration of the firm was general counsel for the Savannah, Florida and Western Railway Company (with Erwin also being elected its vice-president). The future iterations became general counsel for the Plant System of Railroads, and the Southern Express Company. In 1899, following the death of Henry B. Plant, Erwin assumed the role of president of the railroads comprising the Plant system, with Plant's son becoming vice-president; these additional responsibilities led to Erwin stepping away from active practice in 1900. He also became president of the Atlantic Coast Line Railroad, which subsumed the Plant System, from its formation in 1900 until November 1905.

== Personal life ==
Erwin married Julia Henrietta Munro Rogers. They had two children: Julia and Robert. In 1885, Erwin built Erwin Cottage in Old Saybrook, Connecticut.

== Death ==
Erwin died of heart disease in 1906, aged 51, "when he had scarcely more than reached the meridian of life." He had been inspecting his game preserve in Old Saybrook with S. H. Butler and Ansel H. Wright, an employee, when he died. He was interred in Cedar Hill Cemetery in Hartford. His widow survived him by sixteen years, and was buried beside him upon her death, aged 70.
