= Noble Hardee =

American businessman (1805–1867)

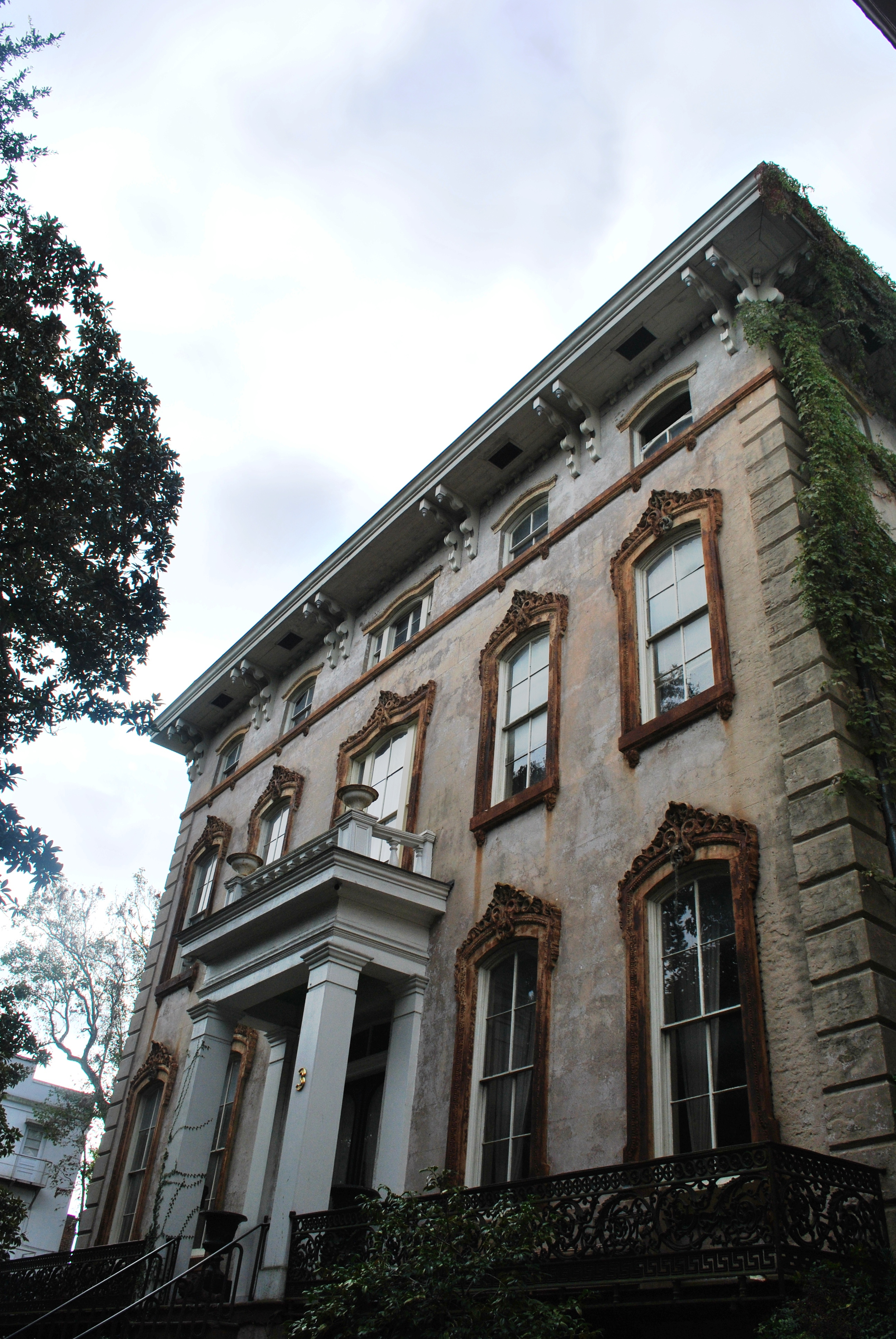
- The Noble Hardee Mansion, 2013
- Born: September 24, 1805; Rural Felicity Plantation, Camden County, Georgia, U.S.
- Died: September 10, 1867 (aged 61); Richfield Springs, New York, U.S.
- Resting place: Bonaventure Cemetery, Savannah, Georgia, U.S.
- Occupation: Merchant
- Spouse: Anne Margaret Lewis (1835–1867; his death)

Noble Andrew Hardee (September 24, 1805 – September 10, 1867) was an American businessman based in Savannah, Georgia, where he was a cotton factor and owner of N. A. Hardee Company. In 1860 he had constructed today's Noble Hardee Mansion in the southwestern corner of Savannah's Monterey Square.

Hardee served in the Georgia House of Representatives.

== Life and career ==
Hardee was born on September 24, 1805, on the Rural Felicity Plantation in Camden County, Georgia, to John Hais Hardee Jr. and Sarah Ellis. He was their fourth child and third son. His brother was lieutenant general William J. Hardee, former commandant at West Point.

In the 1820s, he served in the Georgia House of Representatives.

Around 1825, he married Martha Threewitts Williams, of Milledgeville, Georgia. They had two children: Ann Eliza (born 1826) and John (1830), both of whom died in childhood. Martha died of puerperal fever in 1833.

The 27-year-old widower remained out of the public eye for just over a year. In December 1834, he became a member of the planning committee for the Bill of Rights Ball, which was held in St. Marys, Georgia.

On December 3, 1835, he married Anne Margaret Lewis, daughter of John Lewis and Susan Adams. They had three children who lived to become adults: John Lewis, Susan Ann and Mary Elizabeth.

After moving to Savannah, in 1836 he established N. A. Hardee Company, a cotton factor business at number 6 Upper Stoddard Range on River Street. He hired his eighteen-year-old nephew Charles Seton Henry Hardee, who also tutored Noble's two oldest children. Noble's daughter, Susan Ann, married Confederate States Army brigadier general William W. Kirkland, who was a partner in the company. He also possessed interests in railroads, real estate, banking and insurance.

The 1840 census showed nine people living at the Noble household: himself, his wife, three children and four servants. The family spent summers at the Hardee plantation near Sandersville in Washington County, Georgia.

He served as a member of the Grand Jury in 1859, under Judges Fleming and John M. Millen Jr.

== Death ==
Hardee died on September 10, 1867, aged 61, while in Richfield Springs, New York. His daughter accompanied his body on the voyage home, aboard the SS San Salvador. His funeral took place in November at Savannah's Independent Presbyterian Church. He was interred in Savannah's historic Bonaventure Cemetery. His wife survived him by four years, and was buried beside him upon her death aged 55.

The N. A. Hardee Company was dissolved upon his death. It was re-established by Noble's son John Lewis and William W. Kirkland was N. A. Hardee's Son and Company.

He was described in 1890 as being "a man of strong characteristics and eminent for his virtues and high character ... holding many positions of trust and honor at the time of his death."
