= Marie Prescott =

American stage actress (1850–1893)

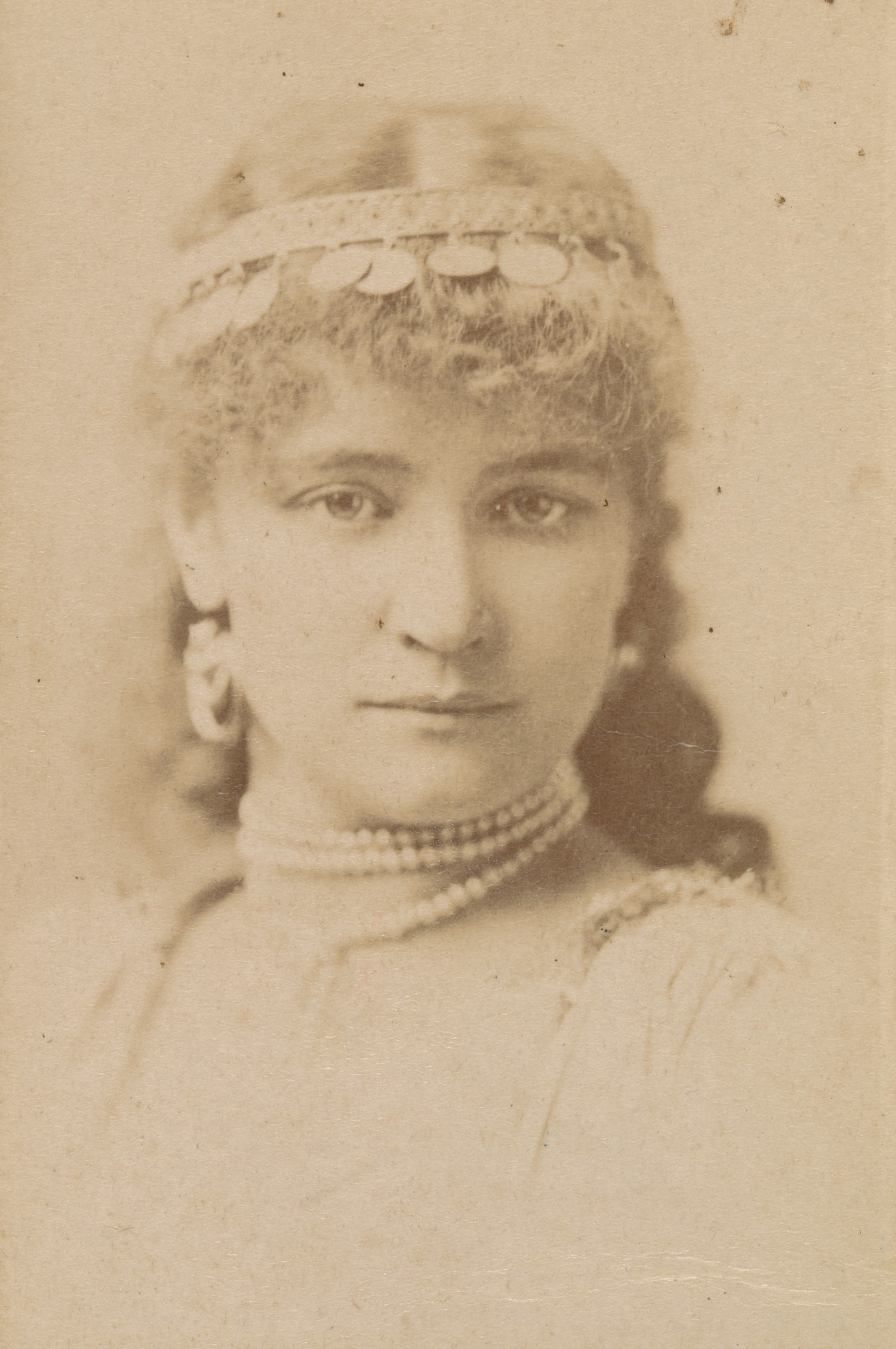
- Marie Prescott as Faustina in The Gladiator, c. 1882
- Born: Marie Victor; June 15, 1850; Nicholas County, Kentucky, US
- Died: August 28, 1893 (aged 43); New York City, US
- Occupations: Actor; playwright
- Years active: 1877–1893
- Spouses: Edward James Burke (m. 1869; div. 1881) William Perzel (m. 1881; div. 1892) R. D. MacLean (m. 1892)

Marie Prescott (June 15, 1850 – August 28, 1893) was an American stage actress and playwright. She is best known for starring in and co-producing Vera; or, The Nihilists, the first play by Oscar Wilde.

== Early life and career ==
Prescott was born in 1850 in Nicholas County, Kentucky. She married in 1869 and, between 1870 and 1873, gave birth to three sons, one of whom died in infancy.

In 1877, she made her stage debut as Lady Macbeth in Cincinnati. She found work in a number of stock companies, appearing alongside such stars as Lawrence Barrett and Dion Boucicault, and between 1880 and 1883, toured with the Italian tragedian Tommaso Salvini and her own companies.

Having obtained a divorce from her first husband in 1881, Prescott married William Perzel, the proprietor of a delicatessen store, and appointed him her manager.

In October 1882, Prescott sued the American News Company for publishing provocative stories about her private life, leading to a high-profile court case. She won the case and was awarded $12,500 in damages (equivalent to $417,000 in 2025), though the judgment was later overturned.

== Vera; or, The Nihilists ==
In November 1882, Prescott and Perzel met with the Irish poet Oscar Wilde, who was then touring America with lectures on art and home decoration, to discuss producing his first play, Vera; or, The Nihilists, a tragedy set in Russia. Prescott and Perzel purchased the rights to the play and produced it for the first time at New York's Union Square Theatre on 20 August 1883 under the title Vera; or, The Nihilist.

Josephine Guy has argued that Prescott was not the "compliant collaborator" that she has often been characterised to be, and, though cordial in her dealings with Wilde, was assertive during contract negotiations and discussions about edits to the script.

Prescott and Perzel's production was almost universally slated by the press, with the New York Tribune declaring it "little better than fizzle" and the New York Herald, "long-drawn dramatic rot". The New York Mirror, in one of the only positive reviews, judged Vera "a work that takes rank among the highest order of plays", and praised Prescott's performance as "marked by intelligence and faultless elocution". Other reviewers criticised Prescott's acting.

Prescott defended the production in an open letter to the press, but Vera failed to attract an audience and she and Perzel were obliged to withdraw it within a week.

== Later career and death ==
After the collapse of Vera, Prescott toured with another Nihilistic tragedy, Czeka, which she had written herself. She began co-starring with the wealthy amateur actor R. D. MacLean in 1886. After divorcing Perzel, she married MacLean in 1892 and the pair toured together, appearing in plays by Shakespeare as well as Prescott's own adaptations of Cleopatra by H. Rider Haggard and Wormwood by Marie Corelli.

Prescott retired from the stage in April 1893 and died in August that year after an unsuccessful operation.
