= Aztec Club of 1847 =

American military society

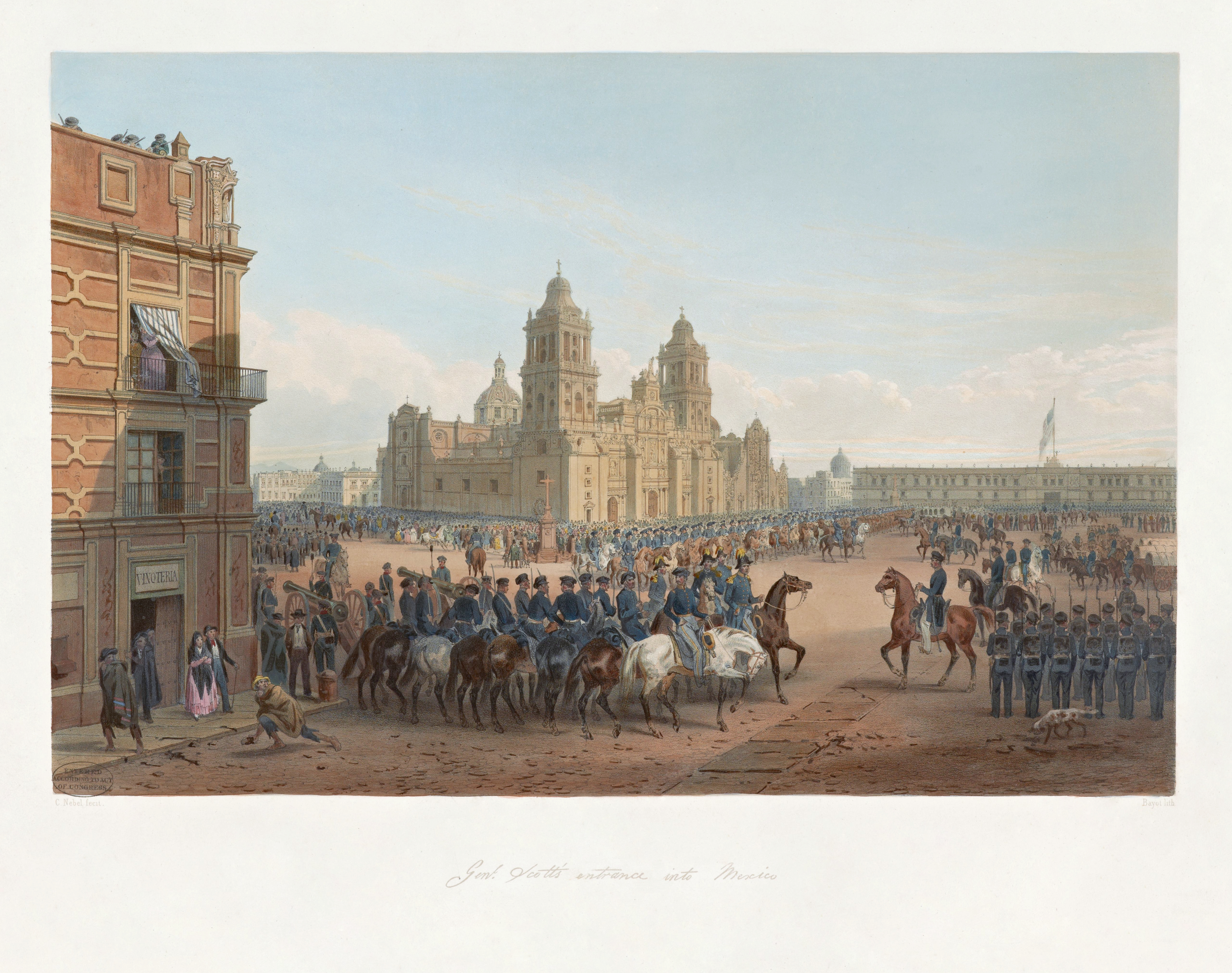
The original Aztec Club occupied the yellow two-story structure left of the Metropolitan Cathedral shown in this contemporary Carl Nebel painting of General Scott entering Mexico City.

The Aztec Club of 1847 is a military society founded in 1847 by United States Army officers of the Mexican–American War. It is a male-only hereditary organization with membership of those who can trace a direct ancestral connection "based on male descent" to those initially eligible or have a "collateral relationship to fourth cousin". Membership is by invitation only and has no membership dues.

Similar to the earlier Society of the Cincinnati, which arose out of the officer class of the American Revolutionary War, the Aztec Club was a precursor of veterans' organizations such as the Grand Army of the Republic, the Military Order of the Loyal Legion of the United States, and the United Confederate Veterans, which veteran officers formed after the American Civil War.

== Origins ==
After the last battles of the Mexican–American War a sizable force of regular U.S. Army troops occupied Mexico City; on October 13, 1847, a meeting of officers was held in the city to form a social organization to help pass the time comfortably until their return to the United States. The original organizers were Robert C. Buchanan, Henry Coppée, John B. Grayson, John B. Magruder, Franklin Pierce, Charles F. Smith, and Charles P. Stone.

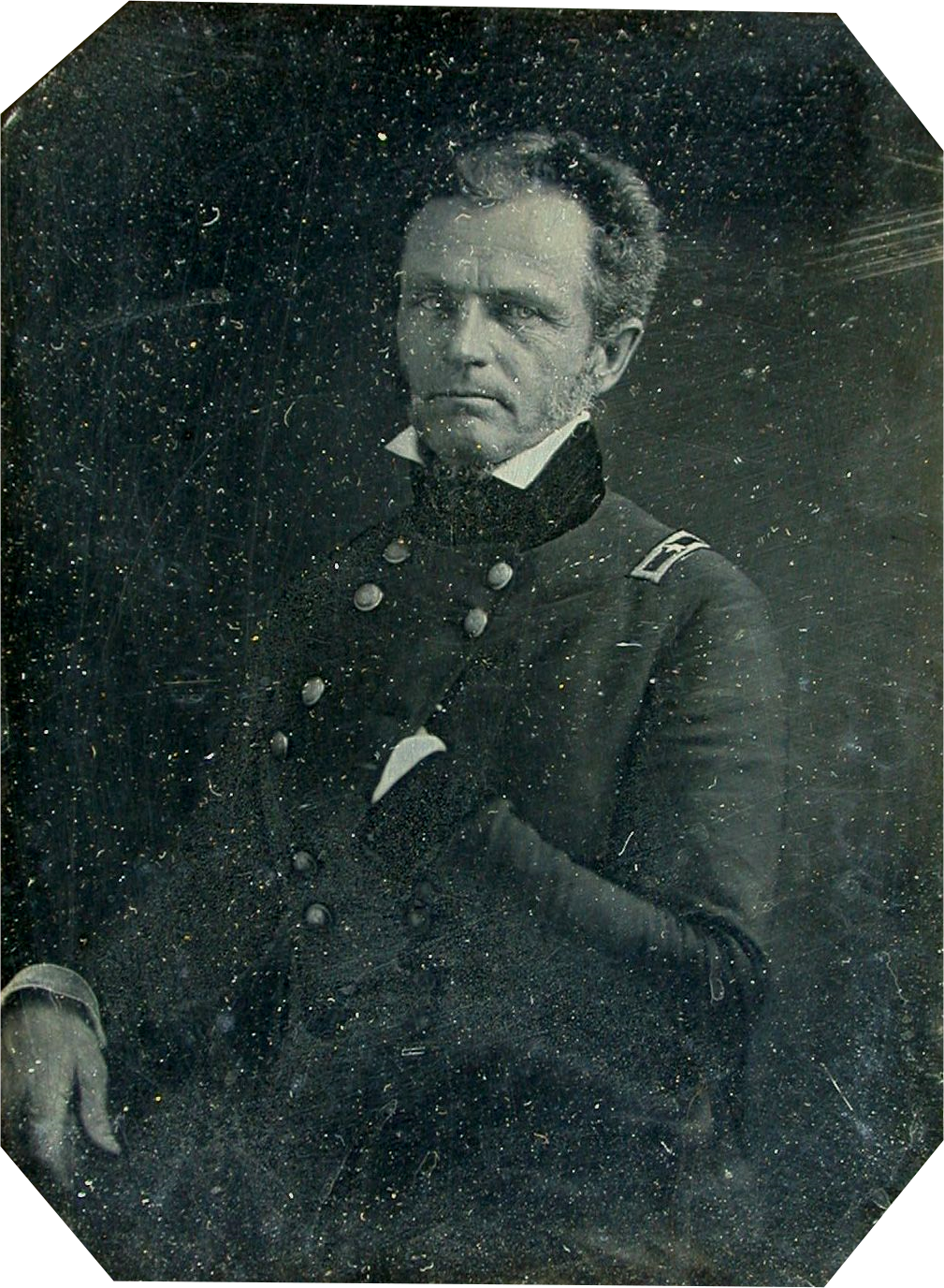
Quitman, c. 1846

The Aztec Club's first president, elected that evening, was John A. Quitman. The club numbered 160 members by the time the army evacuated the City to return to the United States, among its members most of the major figures of the Mexican War American army and a large group whose fame would come a decade and a half later. Membership was extended to all officers who had served in the campaign from Vera Cruz on, and carried much prestige not only in Mexico but in the United States. The founders of the Aztec Club sought to emulate the Society of the Cincinnati, established in 1783 by officers who served in the Revolutionary War. Indeed, many of them were sons or grandsons of the original Cincinnati members.

The site chosen for its clubhouse was the former home of José María Bocanegra, the Mexican minister to the United States, an 18th-century palace initially built for the Viceroy of New Spain, just off the Plaza de la Constitución, the Zócalo of the conquered city. On January 13, 1848, a formal club constitution had been adopted, with a $20 initiation fee. The commanding general of the occupying army, Winfield Scott, was voted into honorary membership.

Winfield Scott wanted to reward his officers, so, using military funds, he hired locals to spruce up the old building turning it into the Aztec Club. Only officers who served with him from Veracruz to the occupation of Mexico City were allowed to attend the private club. The Aztec was a stunning hit with the officers. It allowed them to escape the city's dirt and grime and escape the smell of death. Selected upscale meals were served, and the finest whiskey was provided to those who drank. On occasion, local talent performed.

"We have a magnificent club house, and it is a source of great pleasure and comfort to us." wrote George B. McClellan. "We go there and are sure that we will meet none but gentlemen." The Aztec Club quickly became the place in the city. The ranks of the organization swelled quickly, including William T. Sherman, George G. Meade, and Kentuckian Simon Bolivar Buckner.

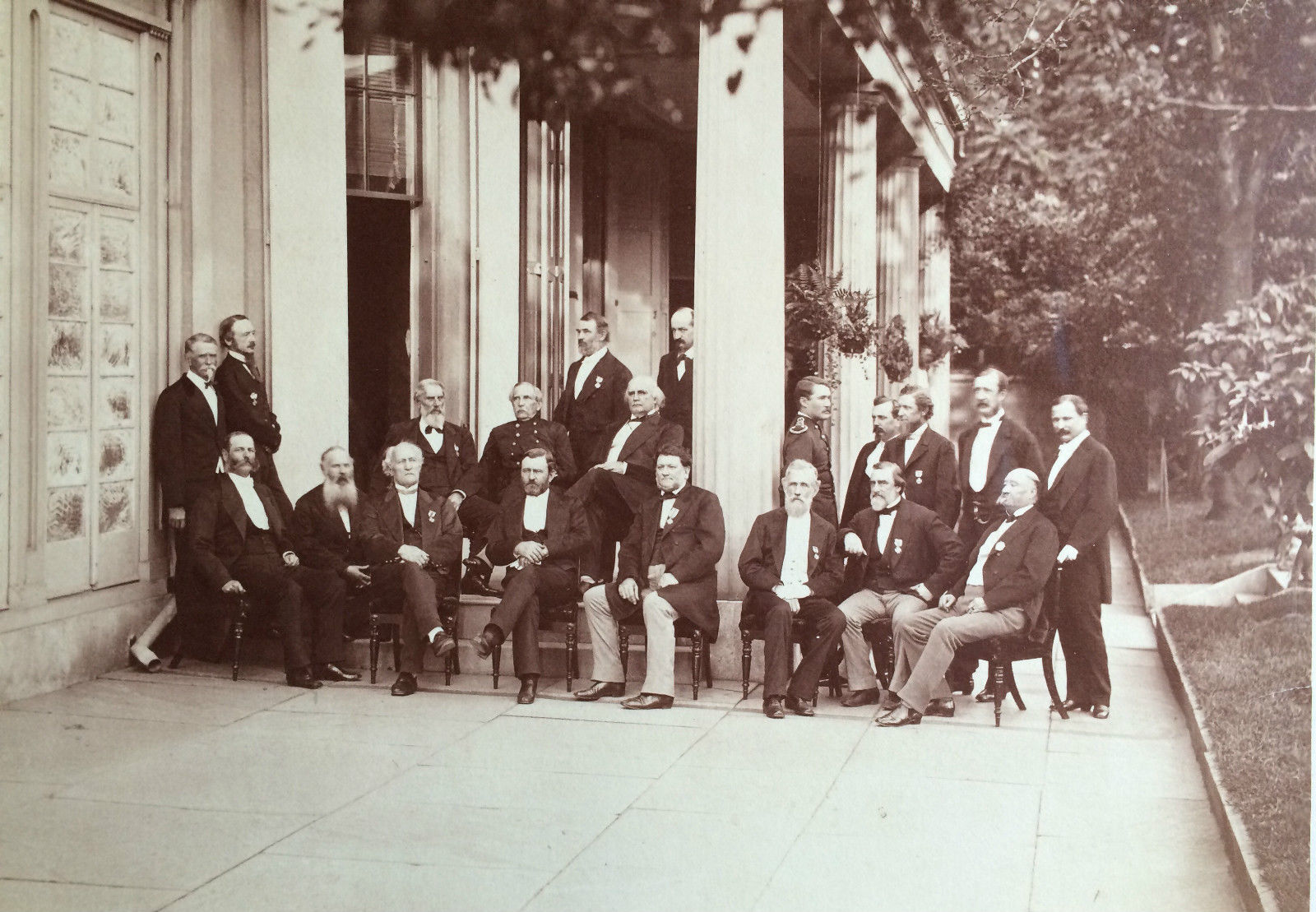
Photograph featuring members of the Aztec Club with guests, was taken at the mansion of Gen. Robert Patterson in Philadelphia during an anniversary dinner of the club on September 16, 1873. Seen in the photograph are former officers of both the Union and Confederate Armies, from left to right: (sitting on the front row) Gen. Fitz John Porter, Capt. Henry Coppee, Gen. Robert Patterson, President Ulysses S. Grant, Gen. George A.H. Blake, Gen. John G. Barnard (misidentified as I.G. Barnard), Gen. Oliver L. Shepherd, and Gen. William H. French; (second row) Governor Milledge L. Bonham, Gen. John J. Abercrombie, Surgeon John M. Cuyler, Gen. T.L. Alexander, Lt. Col. Frederick D. Grant (as a guest of the dinner), Gen. Orville E. Babcock, Capt. E.L.F. Hardcastle, Gen. William F. Barry, and Gen. Cadmus M. Wilcox; (last row) Col. Charles I. Biddle, Gen. Zealous B. Tower, and Gen. Robert E. Patterson.

". . .The Club was organized for the purpose of forming a resort for officers, as a promoter of good fellowship, and of furnishing a home where they could pass their leisure hours in social intercourse, and where more palatable and healthful viands could be procured at a reduced price than at the best Fandas of the city."

— DeLancey Floyd-Jones

Handsome dinners were given, and almost every person of distinction who visited Mexico during its occupation was put up at the club. So popular did it become that after it was fairly in working order, admission was rather difficult. The building was located on one of the streets leading out of the Calle Plateros, but two blocks from the Grand Plaza, a most convenient situation, and not far from the headquarters of General Scott, commander-in-chief.

The Calle Plateros, or Silversmith Street (now part of Avenida Madero), was one of the most prominent in the city and, at the time, corresponded to New York City's Broadway. It had more fine shops than any other in Mexico; hence it was the popular promenade and driving street and the resort of the fashionable young men, who there had the opportunity of meeting their fair friends. Many of the principal hotels and restaurants were located upon it and its extension.

The often raucous meetings were held at the National Theater with Capt. John Bankhead Magruder frequently acting as master of ceremonies before the officer corps left Mexico City during the summer of 1848.

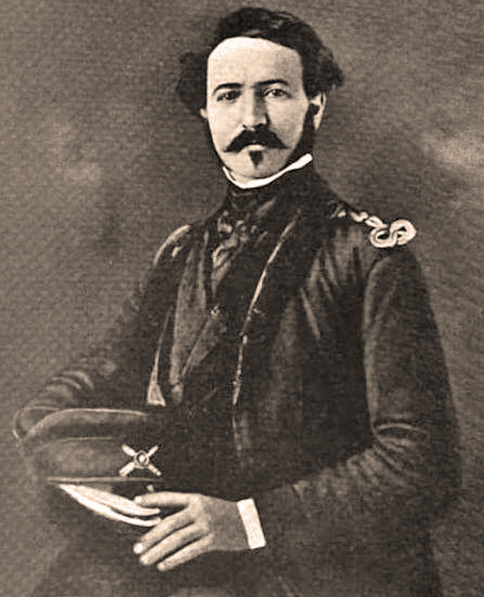
John B. Magruder in an 1848 painting

By March, the Aztec Club's constitution had been printed, along with a list of the original members, all officers serving in Regular or Volunteer units of the U.S. Army or U.S. Navy. Officers from state militia organizations were not eligible for membership. The original constitution stated the club's purpose was to give members a place to live together, dine together, and otherwise entertain their guests, allowing members to pool resources while stationed in the City of Mexico. When it became apparent the army would soon leave the city for home, members met on May 26, 1848, to determine the club's future. While it was impractical to continue the operation of the physical club facility after they left, the members took the first steps to create an organization in perpetuity, electing officers for a term to end September 14, 1852, intending a reunion of members on or before that date at the United States Military Academy at West Point, New York. Upon their return to the United States, a membership diploma and seal were created. Persifor F. Smith was elected as club president to replace Quitman, who had already returned to Washington, D.C. Grayson was elected as "substitute president" and "acting treasurer." In June, the club, consisting of 160 regular and three honorary members, was declared adjourned.

Five of the club's members were the nominees of their respective parties for President of the United States: Franklin Pierce, Ulysses S. Grant, Winfield Scott, George B. McClellan and Winfield S. Hancock; two were elected to the office. Two of its members were candidates for Vice President of the United States (John A. Logan and Simon Bolivar Buckner), and a number of them became Congressmen and high-ranking military and civil officers.

== Military society ==
Club membership was dispersed during the years following the war; in 1852, a group of members met at the United States Military Academy, and on their behalf Fitz-John Porter wrote a letter proposing a new slate of officers, with Benjamin Huger as new club president. In November 1852, Franklin Pierce was elected President of the United States, the first of two Aztec Club members (the other being Ulysses S. Grant) to be elected to the office. (Although some sources state that Zachary Taylor was a member of the Aztec Club, his name is not on the list of the club's 160 Original Members. This is because the club's original members were officers serving in Mexico City, and Taylor served in northeastern Mexico. The club did not expand beyond the 160 original members until 1871, 21 years after Taylor's death.)

During the mid-1850s, reunions with fellow officers were held in various places, but due to members being widely dispersed in military service, the club did not meet as a whole. Members often led reunions of Mexican-American War veterans. John Quitman attended many such reunions and hosted former comrades at his Monmouth plantation at Natchez, Mississippi. Since the club's original constitution seemed inadequate to the needs of such an association, Quitman called a meeting at Delmonico's in New York City, New York, to be held on September 14, 1855, the eighth anniversary of the club's dedication, to form a new "Montezuma Society" designed for "...renewing and cultivating those ties of fellowship and sympathy, which are naturally so prone to exist between men who have served together in War." Matthew C. Perry, recently returned from his trip to Japan, was elected the president of the new society. By 1859, both Perry and Quitman had died, and with them, the Montezuma Society.

== Hereditary society ==
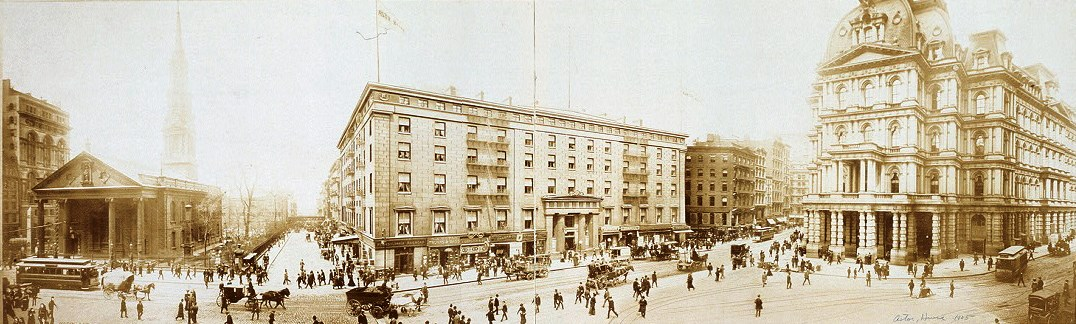
In 1867, Astor House (center) in New York City served as the meeting place for the Aztec Club.

On September 14, 1867, a meeting of the Aztec Club was held at Astor House in New York City. Robert Patterson, original member and last president of the Montezuma Society, was given the chair by motion, with Peter V. Hagner as treasurer and George Sykes to serve as acting secretary. At this meeting, practices were established which would make the organization enduring. Officers were elected, an annual meeting was designated, a list of members was printed, and commemorative insignia were ordered, designed, and distributed to members and families of the 65 deceased club members as of the printing. A practice was established that members would elect the club vice-president, elevated to office when the president died or retired. Patterson retained the presidency of the club from 1867 to 1881.

In November 1868, twenty-one years after the cessation of hostilities in Mexico City, Ulysses S. Grant, an original member of the Aztec Club, was elected President of the United States, the second member elected president. The first was Franklin Pierce.

Many of the club's annual meetings had been held at Patterson's Philadelphia, Pennsylvania, home, but, at President Grant's offer, in 1874, the meeting was held at the White House. Patterson's mansion was located on the southwest corner of 13th and Locust Streets. After he died in 1881, the Historical Society of Pennsylvania purchased the mansion as its permanent home. The mansion was demolished between 1905 and 1909, and a new building was dedicated in 1910.

At the annual meeting held at Hotel Bellevue, Philadelphia, on September 14, 1881, Ulysses S. Grant was elected vice president of the Aztec Club, announcing his intention to become its president.

Following the American Civil War, members of the Aztec Club held a series of meetings significant to its long-term survival, resulting in the club's evolution from a purely military society into a hereditary society that exists to this day. Under Robert Patterson's leadership, the club accomplished what few of its contemporaries did—the successful metamorphosis from a military society to a hereditary one. The subtle changes in membership criteria, from the admission of individuals who served in the war in any theater (1871) to successor membership (1875), and, shortly after Patterson's death, the admission of sons of officers disabled or killed in the Mexican War (1881) created the fabric from which hereditary membership was born. The Aztec Club evolved from a society of military comrades to an organization which first included sons of eligible but deceased officers, and eventually (after his death) became an association of lineal descendants. The archives of the Aztec Club are maintained at the U.S. Army Heritage and Education Center, located at United States Army War College at Carlisle, Pennsylvania.

In 1890, by an Act of Congress, members of the Aztec Club and other military societies founded by men "who served in the armies and navies of the United States in the War of the Revolution, the War of 1812, the Mexican War, and the War of the Rebellion, respectively" were thereafter authorized to wear the insignia of the club "upon all occasions of ceremonies by officers and enlisted men of the Army and Navy of the United States who are members of said organizations in their own right."

Reunions and meetings of the Aztec Club of 1847 have been held annually since 1867. With a current membership of about 425, the Aztec Club's chief goal today is to preserve and disseminate the history of the Mexican–American War.

Commemorating its sesquicentennial, on the morning of October 7, 1997, members of the Aztec Club assembled in Mexico City to embark on a ten-day trip following in near reverse the path that took Winfield Scott and his armies two years to travail. The year prior, when Mexican President Ernesto Zedillo learned of the trip he issued an official invitation to the Aztec Club to visit Chapultepec and committed to attend a formal banquet with the members.

The Aztec Club of 1847 still exists today, maintained by the descendants of the original members. In 2008, the Aztec Club of 1847 filed for trademark protection of its insignia and name which was granted by U. S. Patent and Trademark Office in 2010. The Aztec Club of 1847 is an approved and listed organization of The Hereditary Society Community of the United States of America.
