= Henry Coppée =

American writer and educationalist (1821–1895)

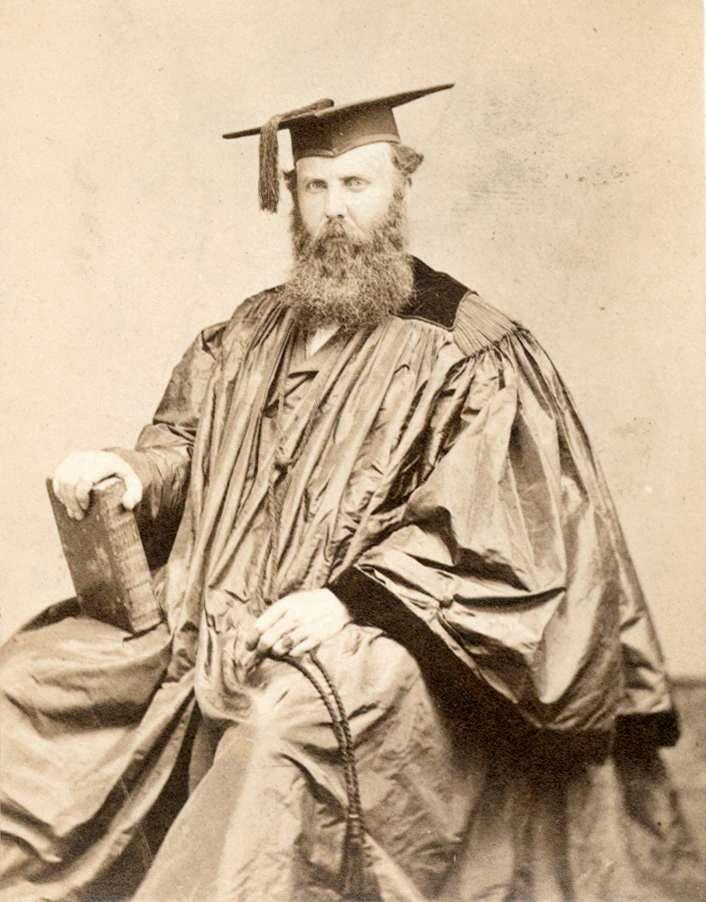
- Born: October 13, 1821; Savannah, Georgia, US
- Died: March 22, 1895 (aged 73); Bethlehem, Pennsylvania, US
- Education: Yale College; United States Military Academy; University of Georgia (MA); University of Pennsylvania and Union College (LLD)
- Occupations: Educator and author

Henry Coppée (October 13, 1821 – March 22, 1895) was an American educator and author. He was the first president of Lehigh University.

== Early life and education ==
Coppée, of French and Haitian descent, was born in Savannah, Georgia, and grew up on Bryan Street as a neighbor of historian Charles Seton Henry Hardee and his family.

Coppée studied at Yale University for two years, and then worked as a civil engineer. He graduated from the United States Military Academy in West Point, New York, in 1845. He completed a master's degree at the University of Georgia in 1848. He earned his law degree from the University of Pennsylvania and Union College of New York in 1866.

== Career ==
=== Military and early education career ===
Coppée served in the Mexican–American War as a lieutenant and was brevetted captain for gallantry at the battles of Contreras and Churubusco. During the American Civil War, he edited the United States Service Magazine.

He was assistant professor of French at West Point from 1848 to 1849, and then principal assistant professor of geography, history, and ethics from 1850 to 1855.

He resigned from the Army on June 30, 1855.

After resigning from the U.S. Army, he was the professor of English literature and history at the University of Pennsylvania in Philadelphia, from 1855 to 1866. In 1856, Coppée was elected to the American Philosophical Society.

He was an officer for the Aztec Club of 1847, serving as a vice president from 1885 to 1887; and as president from 1887 to 1888.

=== Lehigh University ===
In 1866, Coppée was selected by Asa Packer to serve as the first president of Lehigh University in Bethlehem, Pennsylvania; he held this position for nine years, until 1875. He also served as the university's president pro tempore twice. Following the resignation of Lehigh's second president John M. Leavitt in 1880, he served in this capacity for several months. Later, following the death of Robert A. Lamberton in September 1893, he again served in this capacity until his own death on March 22, 1895.

During Coppée's tenure, the university underwent extensive development, including the construction of a number of new buildings and the expansion of the campus. A Moravian church on Packer Avenue was remodeled into Christmas Hall, a house for the president was erected, and Packer Hall, the university center, was built. Coppée lectured in history, logic, rhetoric, political economy, and Shakespeare.

Lehigh University's Coppee Hall, built in 1883, was named for him; it was first a gymnasium, later the home of the Department of Arts and Science, and now houses the university's Journalism and Communication Department.

== Personal life ==
He was a Christian, and compiled Songs of Praise in the Christian Centuries.

== Death ==
Coppée died March 22, 1895, at the age of 73. He was survived by his wife, Julie (née de Witt), and four daughters and one son.

== Selected works ==
- Elements of Logic: Designed as a Manual of Instruction (Philadelphia: E.H. Butler & Co., 1858)
- Elements of Rhetoric: Designed as a Manual of Instruction (Philadelphia: E.H. Butler & Co., 1859)
- Gallery of Famous English and American Poets (Philadelphia: E.H. Butler & Co., 1859)
- A Gallery of Distinguished English and American Female Poets (Philadelphia: E.H. Butler & Co., 1860)
- The Field Manual for Battalion Drill (Philadelphia: J.B. Lippincott & Co., 1862)
- Grant and His Campaigns: A Military Biography (New York: Charles B. Richardson, 1866)
- Elements of Logic: Designed as a Manual of Instruction (Revised Edition. New York: American Book Company, 1872)
- A History of the Civil War in America (Philadelphia: Porter and Coates, 1875)
- History of the Conquest of Spain by the Arab-Moors (Boston: Little, Brown, & Company, 1881)
- General Thomas (New York: D. Appleton & Co., 1893)

== Notes ==
Preceded by none	1st President of Lehigh University; 1866–1875	Succeeded by John McDowell Leavitt
