= Charles Seton Henry Hardee =

American historian (1830–1927)

- Hardee in the early 20th century
- Born: August 9, 1830; Rural Felicity Plantation, Camden County, Georgia, U.S.
- Died: August 22, 1927 (aged 97); Savannah, Georgia, U.S.
- Resting place: Bonaventure Cemetery, Savannah, Georgia, U.S.
- Education: Franklin College of Arts and Sciences (1848)
- Occupation: Historian
- Notable work: Reminiscences of Charles Seton Henry Hardee; Charles Seton Henry Hardee's Recollections of old Savannah
- Spouse: Martha Jane Gaudet (c. 1850–1900; her death)

Charles Seton Henry Hardee (August 9, 1830 – August 22, 1927) was an American historian based in Savannah, Georgia. His memoirs, Reminiscences of Charles Seton Henry Hardee and Charles Seton Henry Hardee's Recollections of Old Savannah, published by his granddaughter after his death, were written when he was over the age of ninety and became noted works on the history of the city's early years. His manuscript was accurate due to his verification of any subject he did not feel completely sure about. He died at his desk in 1927 during the writing of the second volume.

== Life and career ==
Hardee was born in 1830, at the Rural Felicity Plantation in Camden County, Georgia, to physician John Hais Hardee and Isabella Seton Henry. He was one of their five children, all boys. His father died in 1835, aged 32, when Charles was four years old, and was buried in the family cemetery at the plantation.

He was given the full name Charles Seton Henry Hardee at his baptism; Charles Seton Henry was his lawyer uncle.

After becoming widowed, Hardee's mother moved to Savannah, where her brother and two sisters, Charlotte and Fanny, had been living. The family arrived, on the sloop Virginia, at the Lower Rice Mill wharf, to the west of East Broad Street. They walked a short distance and climbed a long flight of stone steps from Factors Walk up to Emmet Park in Savannah's Old Fort neighborhood. They continued west along Bay Street to Jefferson Street, where they turned south for one block, to the northern side of Bryan Street, then continued to the eastern tenement of a two-story home that was in the process of being built midway between Jefferson and Montgomery streets, in the northeastern residential lot of Franklin Square. (This block is a parking garage today.) At the time of their residence there, that portion of Bryan Street was a "respectable residential section (but not so now)." One of their neighbors was French physician Dr. Coppée and his family, including Henry Coppée. Hardee's family lived on Bryan Street for around a year, before moving to "a more eligible location" on Broughton Street. Their new home was one tenement of a three-story brick building on the northern side of the street, between Bull and Whitaker streets.

In 1835, Hardee was entered into Chatham Academy in Savannah.

Hardee and his brother, John, were sent by their mother to visit their paternal grandparents, Major John Hais Hardee Jr. and Sarah Ellis, at Rural Felicity in the fall of 1838. While there, during a visit to Brunswick, Georgia, to pick up supplies for the house, their grandfather fell sick. He died on November 1, aged 69. Their grandmother followed a decade later, aged 74.

Hardee began studying at Franklin College in Athens, Georgia, in 1844. He travelled the 250 miles along the Savannah River to Augusta, Georgia, aboard the iron steamboat Chatham. From Augusta, he took the Georgia Railroad to Union Point, Georgia, then branched off to Athens.

After graduating in 1848, he returned to Savannah, where he was hired by his uncle, Noble Hardee, to tutor his two oldest children.

Hardee married Martha Jane Gallaudet around 1850. They had ten known children: daughters Alice, Isabella, Margaret, Meta, Martha, Harriet, and Frances, and sons Charles, James, and Robert.

In 1859, Hardee formed a law partnership with Robert Erwin, father of noted lawyer and businessman Robert G. Erwin.

During the American Civil War, Hardee was second lieutenant in the adjutant general's department. He assisted Colonel John Dunwody in operating the camp at Calhoun, Georgia. He later became major and assistant adjutant general and was in charge of Camp No. 2 in Decatur, Georgia. After a little over a year in the role, his position was filled by Lieutenant Colonel Harris, who had been relieved from active field service due to his failing health. Feeling he had been treated unjustly, Hardee resigned and returned to Savannah. There, he was appointed Agent of the War Department, whose headquarters were in the city. His role was to receive cotton arriving in Savannah from the Confederate government or by the State of Georgia and forward it through the blockade whenever the opportunity arose. He was later forced to evacuate Savannah for a period of four months.

He was given a position as Deputy Collector of the Port and Assistant Depositary in the Savannah Treasury Department, filling a vacancy left by the death of John Boston.

Late in Hardee's life, when he was the oldest surviving graduate of Franklin College, his father's branch of the family had become extinct, for his paternal uncle and aunt, Charlotte, had no children, while the five children and two grandchildren of Fanny had all died. The succession of the Henry-Seton family was left to his mother's descendants. His mother died in 1890, aged 83. She is interred in Savannah's Laurel Grove Cemetery. His daughter, Martha, died the same year, aged 26. He became a widower on March 17, 1900, when his wife died at the age of 67. She was interred in Savannah's Bonaventure Cemetery.

== Death ==
Hardee died in Savannah in 1927, aged 97, while at his desk writing Charles Seton Henry Hardee's Recollections of Old Savannah, the second volume of his memoirs. "His pencil did not drop from his weary fingers. His notebook lay on his table, ready for further recollections of the development of his beloved city," wrote his granddaughter Martha Gallaudet Waring, wife of physician Thomas Pinckney Waring, who had his works published. He was interred beside his wife at Bonaventure Cemetery.
