= Rural Felicity Plantation =

Former plantation in Camden County, Georgia

- Interactive map of the Rural Felicity Plantation area

General information
- Location: Hazzards Neck, Camden County, Georgia, U.S.
- Coordinates: 31°03′35″N 81°34′02″W
- Construction started: 1787

Rural Felicity Plantation was a plantation, occupying around 1,300 acres (530 ha) of land, in Camden County, Province of Georgia. Located on the southern banks of the Little Satilla River, it was given by the State of Georgia to John Hais Hardee Sr. in 1787 for his distinguished service during the American Revolutionary War. He was one of the first burials there, upon his death in 1809, aged 61.

A family burial ground, which has come to be known as the Hull Cemetery, exists on the property. (Joseph Hull, who lived in nearby Little York, married Sarah Hardee, the sister of physician John Hais Hardee Jr., who was born in 1803. Hull was buried in the cemetery after his death in 1865, four years after his wife.)

Lieutenant general William J. Hardee was born at the plantation house in 1815.

The 1830 Camden County census indicated that John Hais Hardee Jr. and his sons, Thomas Ellis and Noble Hardee (brothers of William), owned 114 slaves. Upon the death of John Jr. in 1838, another of his sons, George Washington Hardee, took over the running of the plantation until the death of his mother, Sarah, in 1848, after which he moved across the nearby state line to Florida.

Charles Seton Henry Hardee, another grandson of John Jr. and Sarah, visited his grandparents at the plantation, where he was born in 1830, several times during his childhood. He documented them in his memoir Reminiscences of Charles Seton Henry Hardee, which was published by his granddaughter after his death in 1927. His father, John, was buried at the plantation upon his death, aged 32, in 1835.

"At the first bend of the stair case, 'in the house where I was born' at Rural Felicity, stood a Grandfather Clock about six feet high," wrote Hardee. "It was a source of never failing delight to me to watch the measured swing of its long pendulum and listen to its loud ticking, as it marked the rapid flight of time by seconds, minutes and hours."

At the rear of the house was a piazza that ran almost the entire width of the house. It looked northward "over an almost boundless continuity of marsh, with the Little Satilla River gleaming brightly in the sunshine in the distance." Rowboats travelling to or from Brunswick, Georgia, "about ten miles from Rural Felicity, in a northerly direction, had to cross over the Little Satilla."

A 16-year-old Hardee's final visit to the plantation occurred in 1846. His grandmother was living with George Washington Hardee, his uncle, who was "thirty-three years old at the time and unmarried."
