= R. D. MacLean =

American actor

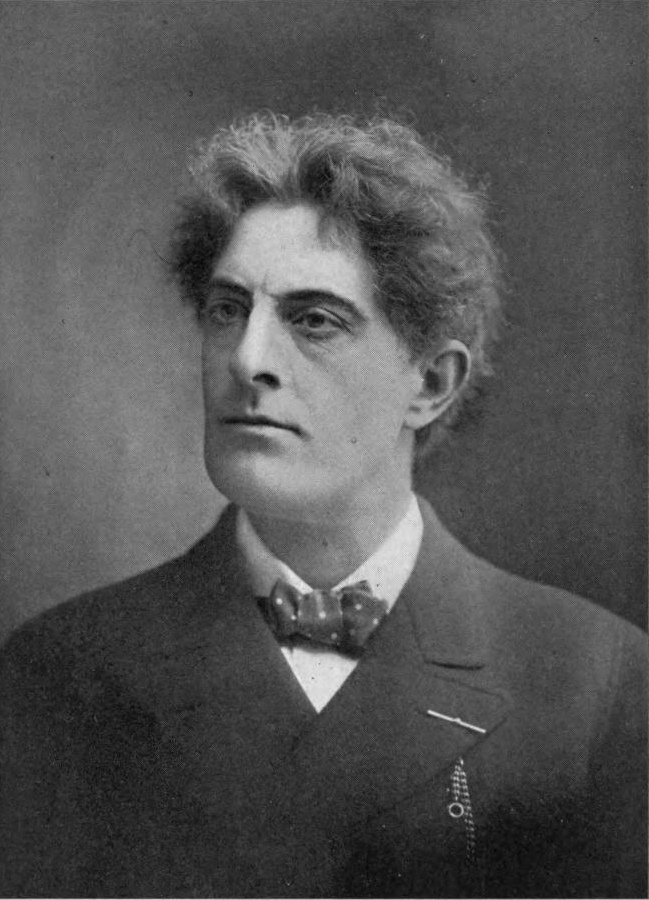
- Born: Rezin Davis Shepherd; March 7, 1859; New Orleans, Louisiana, U.S.
- Died: June 28, 1946 (aged 87); Los Angeles, California, U.S.
- Occupation: Actor
- Spouses: Marie Prescott; Odette Tyler

Rezin Davis Shepherd, known professionally as R. D. MacLean (March 7, 1859 – June 28, 1946) was an American actor.

Shepherd was born on March 7, 1859, to Henry Shepherd II and his wife Azemia. As the son of a prosperous landowner, Shepherd became an agent for his father's Louisiana properties and for the Louisiana properties of other relatives at the age of 19. He attended college at Washington and Lee College and the University of Virginia. In 1879, Shepherd made his amateur stage debut in New Orleans as Brutus in a production of Julius Caesar. Following this, he formed his own Shakespearean theater company in Louisiana.

In the 1880s, Shepherd moved to New York to pursue professional acting, adopting the name R.D. MacLean (or McLean), after his mother's maiden name. His first appearance was in a production of Pygmalion and Galatea as Pygmalion in Kingston, New York. He joined Marie Prescott's company in New York City, working in Shakespearean repertoire for seven years. In 1891, he inherited the Shepherd family estate, Wild Goose Farm near Shepherdstown, West Virginia. He married Marie Prescott in 1892, and they moved to Wild Goose in 1893. However, Prescott died of cancer in New York not long after. In 1897, MacLean returned to the theater, meeting actress Odette Tyler, whom he married on April 1, 1897.

In 1906, the couple retired in West Virginia, but in 1911 they sold the farm and moved to Washington, D.C., and resumed acting. In 1919, the couple moved to Los Angeles, where they appeared in a few movies. In 1928, MacLean received a Doctor of Letters degree from the University of Southern California. Odette died of a heart attack in 1936, and MacLean died on June 28, 1946, of a heart ailment.
