= Seaton Grantland =

American politician (1782–1864)

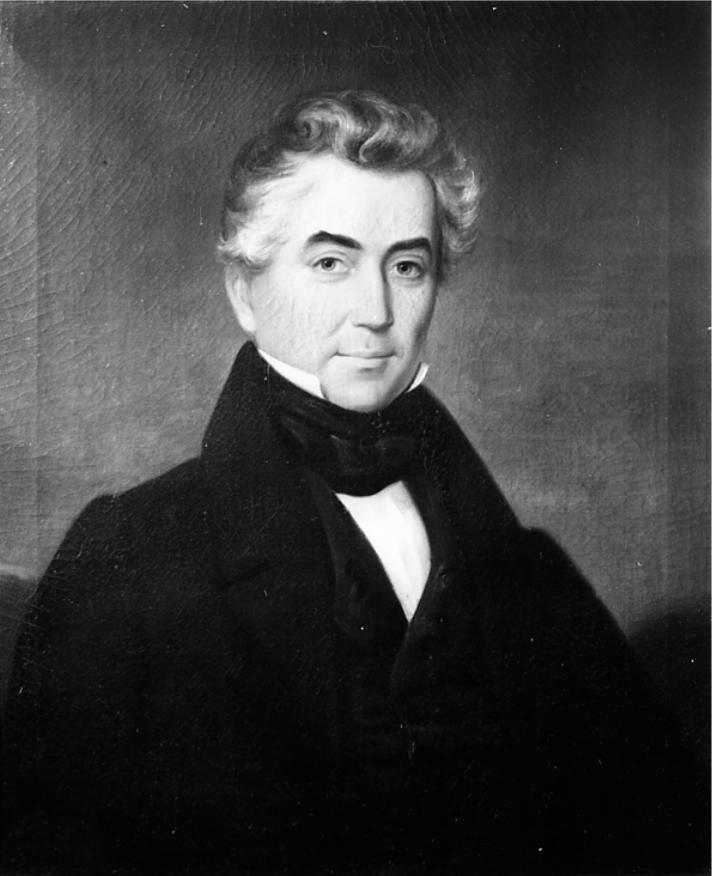
- Portrait of Grantland c. 1845

Personal details
- Born: June 8, 1782 New Kent County, Virginia, U.S.
- Died: October 18, 1864 (aged 82)
- Resting place: Memory Hill Cemetery, near Milledgeville, Georgia, U.S.
- Relations: Fleming Grantland DuBignon (grandson)
- Occupation: Lawyer, politician

Seaton Grantland (June 8, 1782 – October 18, 1864) was a United States representative from Georgia. He was born in New Kent County, Virginia. He pursued an academic course and studied law. He was admitted to the bar and commenced practice in Milledgeville, Georgia.

Grantland was elected as a Jacksonian Democrats to the 24th United States Congress and reelected as a Democrat to the 25th Congress. He was a presidential elector on the Whig ticket in 1840. He was also registered in Baldwin County, Georgia, as one of the largest slaveowners in 1850.

== Family ==
With his brother, Fleming, Grantland established The Milledgeville Journal newspaper in 1809. It was printed for a decade, until Fleming's death at the age of 28 or 29, at which point Grantland sold the paper. He started a new partnership later in 1819, with Richard McAllister Orme. That newspaper was titled The Southern Recorder. Grantland was the editor until 1833, when he sold his interest to Miller Grieve, to whom he was related by marriage.

== Death ==
Grantland died at his home, "Woodville", near Milledgeville in 1864, aged 82. He was buried in Memory Hill Cemetery in Milledgeville.

U.S. House of Representatives
Preceded by George Rockingham Gilmer	Member of the U.S. House of Representatives from Georgia's at-large congressional district March 4, 1835 – March 3, 1839	Succeeded by Eugenius Aristides Nisbet
