= William J. Hardee =

American military officer (1815–1873)

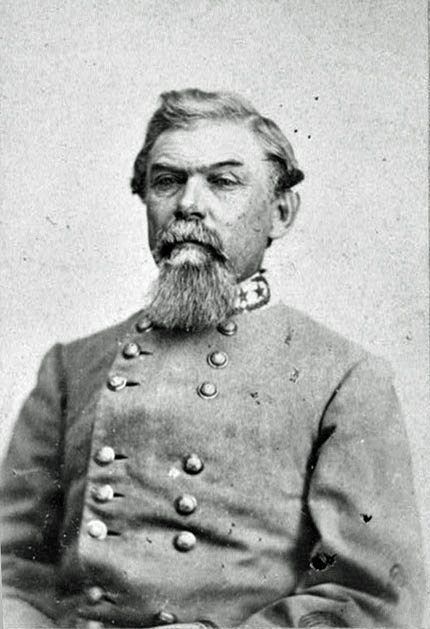
- Hardee in c. 1862
- Born: October 12, 1815; Camden County, Georgia, U.S.
- Died: November 6, 1873 (aged 58); Wytheville, Virginia, U.S.
- Military career
- Allegiance: United States; Confederate States
- Branch: United States Army; Confederate States Army
- Service years: 1838–1861 (U.S.); 1861–1865 (C.S.)
- Rank: Lieutenant Colonel (U.S.); Lieutenant-General (C.S.)
- Nickname: "Old Reliable"
- Commands: First Corps, Army of Tennessee
- Conflicts: See battles: Second Seminole War; Mexican–American War; Thornton Affair; Battle of Monterrey; Siege of Veracruz; Battle for Mexico City; American Civil War; Battle of Shiloh; Battle of Perryville; Battle of Stones River; Third Battle of Chattanooga; Battle of Peachtree Creek; Battle of Atlanta; Siege of Savannah; Battle of Averasborough; Battle of Bentonville

Lieutenant-General William Joseph Hardee (October 12, 1815 – November 6, 1873) was an American military officer. He served in the United States Army in both the Second Seminole War and in the Mexican–American War. He was later commissioned as a general in the Confederate States Army in 1861. Hardee saw combat in the Western Theater of the American Civil War and was known to quarrel sharply with two of his commanding officers, Braxton Bragg and John Bell Hood. He later served in the Atlanta campaign of 1864 and the Carolinas campaign of 1865, where he surrendered with Joseph E. Johnston to the Union side led by William Tecumseh Sherman in April. Hardee's writings about military tactics were widely used on both sides in the conflict.

== Early life and career ==
Hardee was born to Sarah Ellis and Major John Hais Hardee Jr. at the Rural Felicity Plantation in Camden County, Georgia. One of his brothers was noted Savannah merchant Noble Hardee. He graduated from the United States Military Academy at West Point in 1838 (26th in a class of 45) and was commissioned a second lieutenant in the 2nd U.S. Dragoons. During the Seminole Wars (1835–42), he was stricken with illness, and while hospitalized he met and married Elizabeth Dummett. After he recovered, the Army sent him to France to study military tactics in 1840. He was promoted to first lieutenant in 1839 and to captain in 1844.

In the Mexican–American War, Hardee served in the Army of Occupation under Zachary Taylor and won two brevet promotions (to brevet major for Medelin and Vera Cruz, and to lieutenant colonel for St. Augustin). He served with the 2nd U.S. Dragoons, and was second in command to Seth Thornton, when they were ambushed and surrounded by Mexican troops and subsequently captured on April 25, 1846, at Carricitos Ranch, Texas, during the "Thornton Affair". He was exchanged on May 11. Now serving under Winfield Scott, Hardee was wounded in a skirmish at La Rosia, Mexico (about 30 miles (48 km) above Matamoros) in 1847. After the war, he led units of Texas Rangers and soldiers in Texas.

After his wife died in 1853, he returned to West Point as a tactics instructor and served as commandant of cadets from 1856 to 1860. He served as the senior major in the 2nd U.S. Cavalry (later renumbered as the 5th U.S. Cavalry) when that regiment was formed in 1855 and then as the lieutenant colonel of the 1st U.S. Cavalry in 1860. In 1855 at the behest of Secretary of War Jefferson Davis, Hardee published Rifle and Light Infantry Tactics for the Exercise and Manoeuvres of Troops When Acting as Light Infantry or Riflemen, popularly known as Hardee's Tactics, which became the best-known drill manual of the Civil War. He is also said to have designed the so-called Hardee hat about this time.

== American Civil War ==
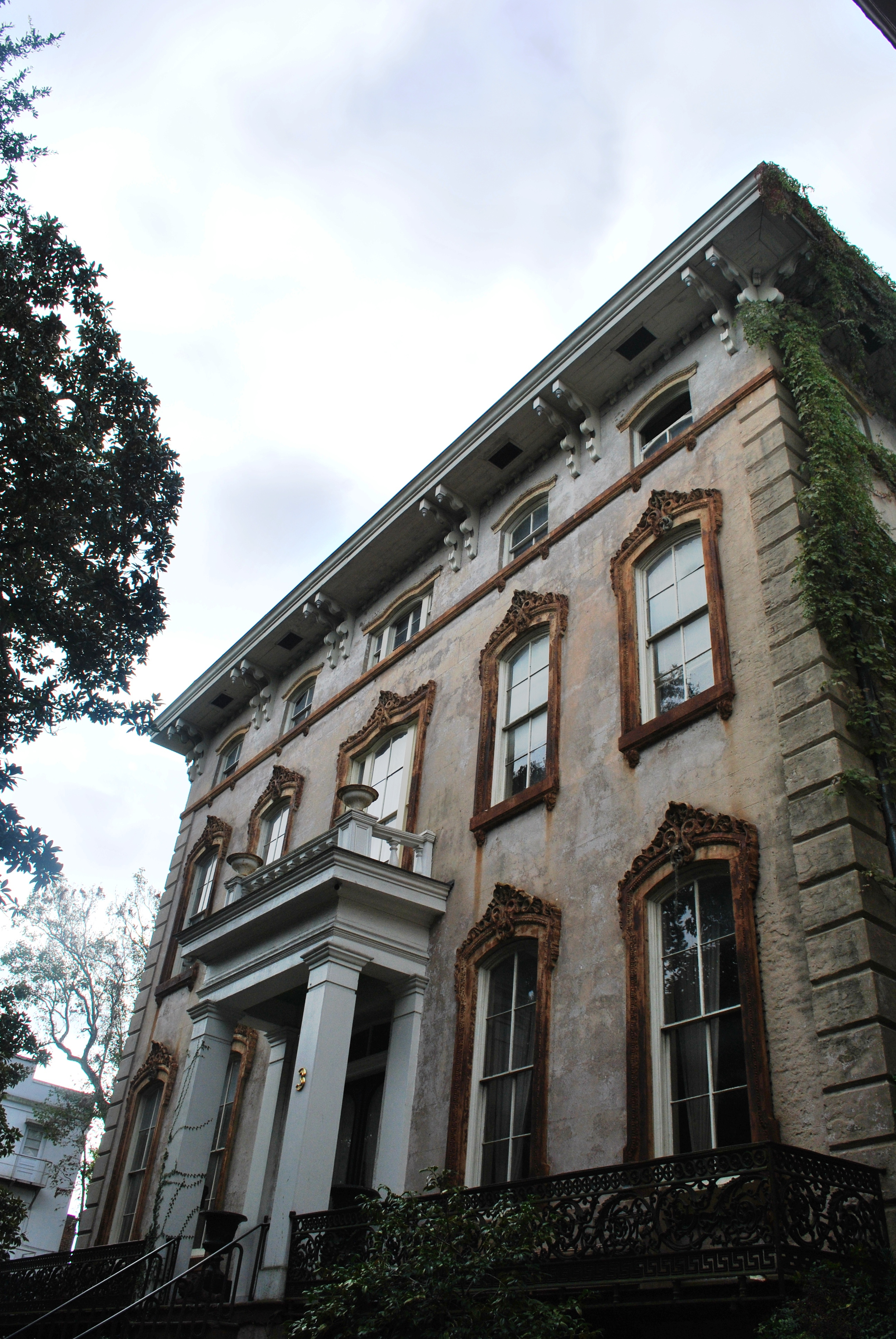
The Noble Hardee Mansion, 1860–1869, 3 West Gordon Street, Savannah

Hardee resigned his U.S. Army commission on January 31, 1861, after his home state of Georgia seceded from the Union. He joined the Confederate States Army as a colonel on March 7 and was given command of Forts Morgan and Gaines in Alabama. He was subsequently promoted to brigadier general (June 17) and major general (October 7). By October 10, 1862, he was one of the first Confederate lieutenant generals.

His initial assignment as a general was to organize a brigade of Arkansas regiments and he impressed his men and fellow officers by solving difficult supply problems and for the thorough training he gave his brigade. He received his nickname, "Old Reliable", while with this command. Hardee operated in Arkansas until he was called to join General Albert Sidney Johnston's Army of Central Kentucky as a corps commander. Johnston would withdraw from Kentucky and Tennessee, into Mississippi, before launching a surprise attack at the Battle of Shiloh in the spring of 1862. Hardee was wounded in the arm on April 6, 1862, during the first day of the battle.

Johnston was killed at Shiloh and Hardee's corps joined General Braxton Bragg's Army of Tennessee prior to the Siege of Corinth, Mississippi, until Department Commander P.G.T. Beauregard evacuated the town and withdrew to Tupelo. Beauregard was replaced by Bragg, who subsequently moved his army to Chattanooga before embarking on his Confederate Heartland Offensive into Kentucky. That campaign concluded with the Battle of Perryville in October 1862, where Hardee commanded the Left Wing of Bragg's army.

Portrait of William J. Hardee, held at Fort McAllister state park in Georgia

In arguably his most successful battle, at the Battle of Stones River that December, his Second Corps launched a massive surprise assault upon the right flank of Maj. Gen. William Rosecrans's army, driving it almost to defeat, but again, as had happened at Perryville, Bragg failed to follow up his tactical success, opting instead to withdraw before the arrival of Union reinforcements.

After the Tullahoma Campaign, Hardee lost patience with the irascible, retreating Bragg and briefly commanded the Department of Mississippi and East Louisiana under General Joseph E. Johnston. During this period, he met Mary Foreman Lewis, an Alabama plantation owner, whom he would later marry in January 1864.

Hardee returned to Bragg's army after the Battle of Chickamauga, taking over the corps of Leonidas Polk at Chattanooga, Tennessee, besieging the Union Army there. During the Chattanooga campaign in November 1863, Hardee's Corps of the Army of Tennessee was defeated when Union troops under Maj. Gen. George Henry Thomas assaulted their seemingly impregnable defensive lines at the Battle of Missionary Ridge.

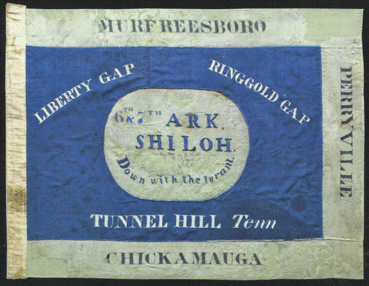
One of Hardee's white disc on blue pattern battle flags, the flag of the 6th and 7th Arkansas Infantry Regiments, bearing the battle honors "Shiloh", "Chickamauga", "Murfreesboro", "Perryville", "Liberty Gap", "Ringgold Gap", and "Tunnel Hill"

Hardee renewed his opposition to serving under Bragg and joined a group of officers who finally convinced Confederate President Jefferson Davis to relieve Bragg. Hardee was given temporary command of the Army of Tennessee before Joseph E. Johnston took over command at Dalton, Georgia. In February 1864, Johnston was ordered by the President to dispatch Hardee to Alabama, to reinforce General Polk against General Sherman's Meridian Campaign.

Following Sherman's withdrawal to Vicksburg, Hardee was once again sent back to Georgia, where he joined Johnston's army for the Atlanta campaign. As Johnston fought a war of maneuver and retreat against Maj. Gen. William T. Sherman, the Confederacy eventually lost patience with him and replaced him with the much more aggressive Lt. Gen. John Bell Hood. Hardee could not abide Hood's reckless assaults and heavy casualties. After the Battle of Jonesboro that August and September, he requested a transfer and was sent to command the Department of South Carolina, Georgia, and Florida. He opposed Sherman's March to the Sea as best he could with inadequate forces, eventually evacuating Savannah, Georgia on December 20.

As Sherman turned north in the Carolinas campaign, Hardee took part in the Battle of Bentonville, North Carolina, in March 1865, where his only son, 16-year-old Willie, was mortally wounded in a cavalry charge. Johnston's plan for Bentonville was for Hardee to engage one of Sherman's wings at Averasborough so that Johnston could deal with one wing piecemeal. The plan was unsuccessful. He surrendered along with Johnston to Sherman on April 26 at Durham Station.

== Later life and death ==
After the war, Hardee settled at his wife's Alabama plantation. After returning it to working condition, the family moved to Selma, Alabama, where Hardee worked in the warehousing and insurance businesses. He eventually became president of the Selma and Meridian Railroad. Hardee was the co-author of The Irish in America, published in 1868. He fell ill at his family's summer retreat at White Sulphur Springs, West Virginia, and died in Wytheville, Virginia on November 6, 1873. He is buried in Live Oak Cemetery, Selma, Alabama.

== See also ==
- List of Confederate generals
