= Woodville (Milledgeville, Georgia) =

Historic house in Georgia, United States

- U.S. National Register of Historic Places
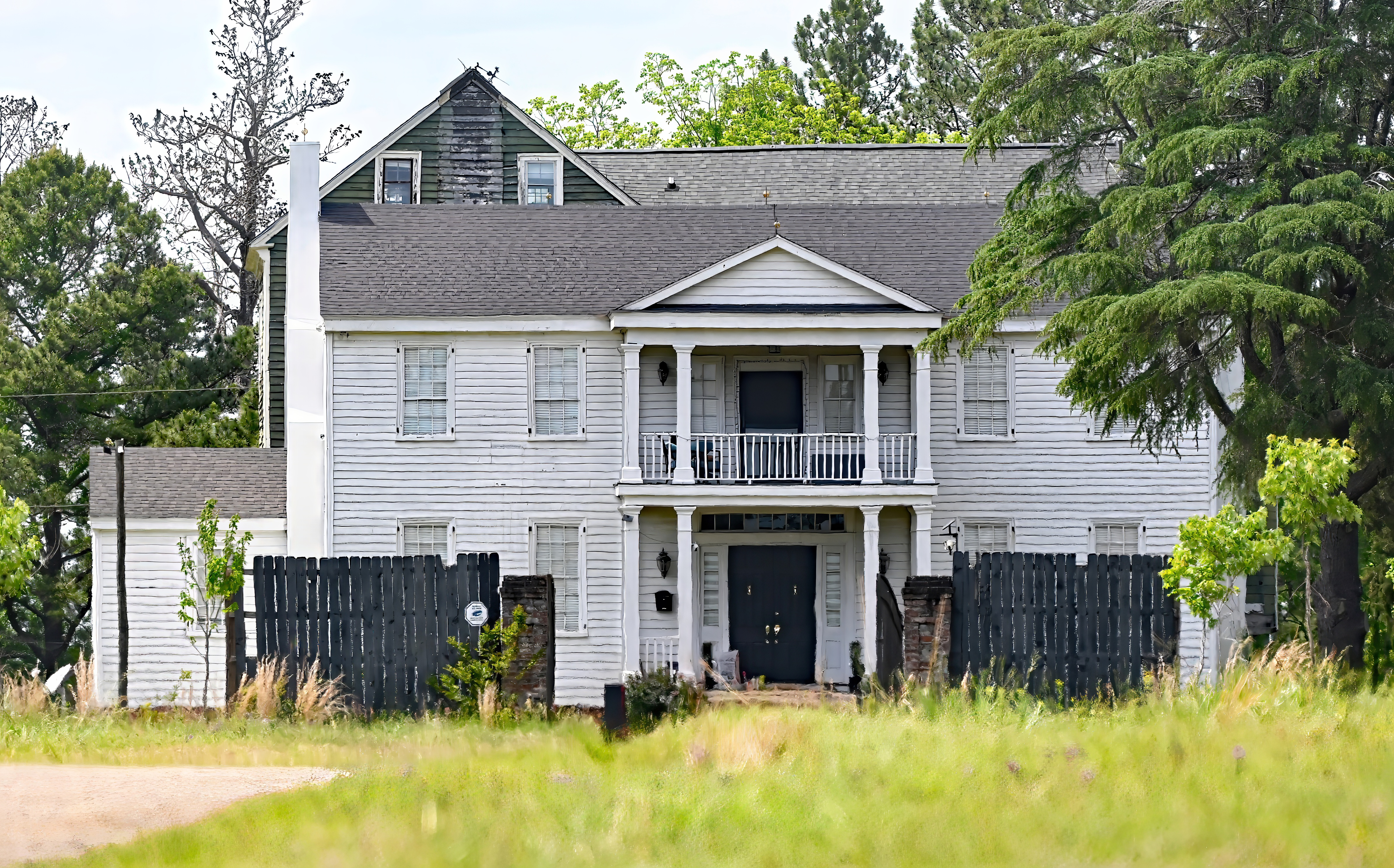
- Woodville in 2023

- Location within Georgia Location within the United States
- Nearest city: Milledgeville, Georgia
- Coordinates: 33°1′4″N 83°14′32″W
- Area: 5 acres (2.0 ha)
- Built: 1819
- Architectural style: Plantation Plain house
- NRHP reference No.: 79000695
- Added to NRHP: June 22, 1979

Westover is a historic mansion on a Southern plantation near Milledgeville, Georgia, United States.

== History ==
The plantation was established in the late 1810s. The great house was built in 1819 for John Clark, who served as the governor of Georgia from 1819 to 1824. It was later purchased by Congressman Seaton Grantland. It was inherited by his daughter, Ann Grantland DuBignon, mother of Fleming Grantland DuBignon, in the 1860s. Fleming was born here in 1854.

In the 1920s, the plantation was acquired by Bim Richardson, who sold it to Carl Bentley in the 1940s.

== Architectural significance ==
The plantation house has been listed on the National Register of Historic Places since June 22, 1979.
