= Congress Street (Savannah, Georgia) =

Prominent street in Savannah, Georgia

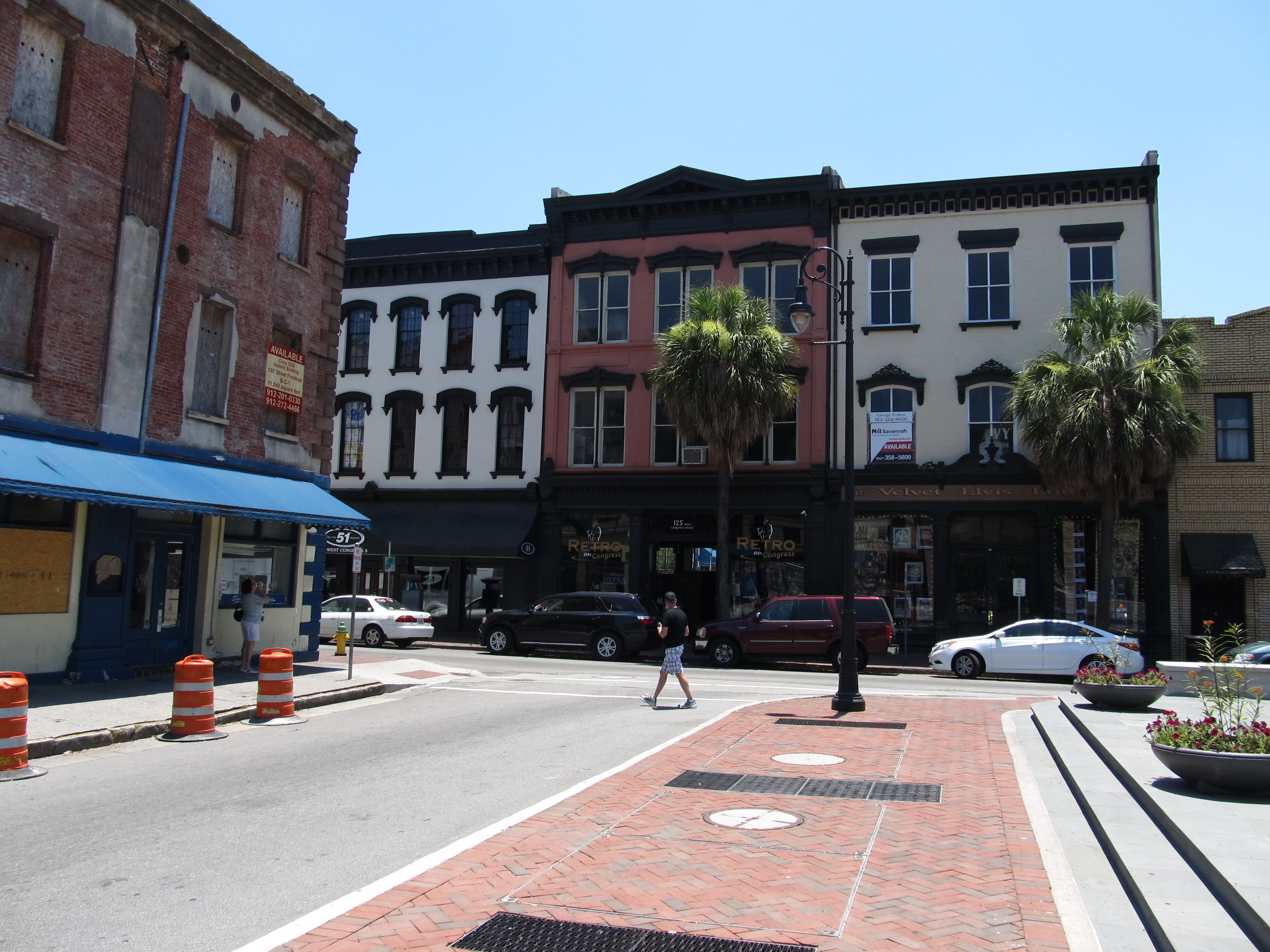
- Congress Street (the cross street in this photograph) passing through Ellis Square, viewed from Barnard Street
- Former names: Queen Street; Eveleigh Street
- Length: 0.76 mi (1.22 km)
- Location: Savannah, Georgia, U.S.
- West end: Martin Luther King Jr. Boulevard
- East end: East Broad Street

Congress Street is a prominent street in Savannah, Georgia, United States. Located between Bryan Street to the north and Broughton Street to the south, it runs for about 0.76 miles (1.22 km) from Martin Luther King Jr. Boulevard in the west, through the city's City Market, to East Broad Street in the east. Originally known only as Congress Street singular, its addresses are now split between "West Congress Street" and "East Congress Street", the transition occurring at Bull Street in the center of the downtown area. The street is entirely within Savannah Historic District, a National Historic Landmark District.

Congress Street passes through six squares on their southern side. From west to east:

- Franklin Square
- Ellis Square
- Johnson Square
- Reynolds Square
- Warren Square
- Washington Square

== Notable buildings and structures ==
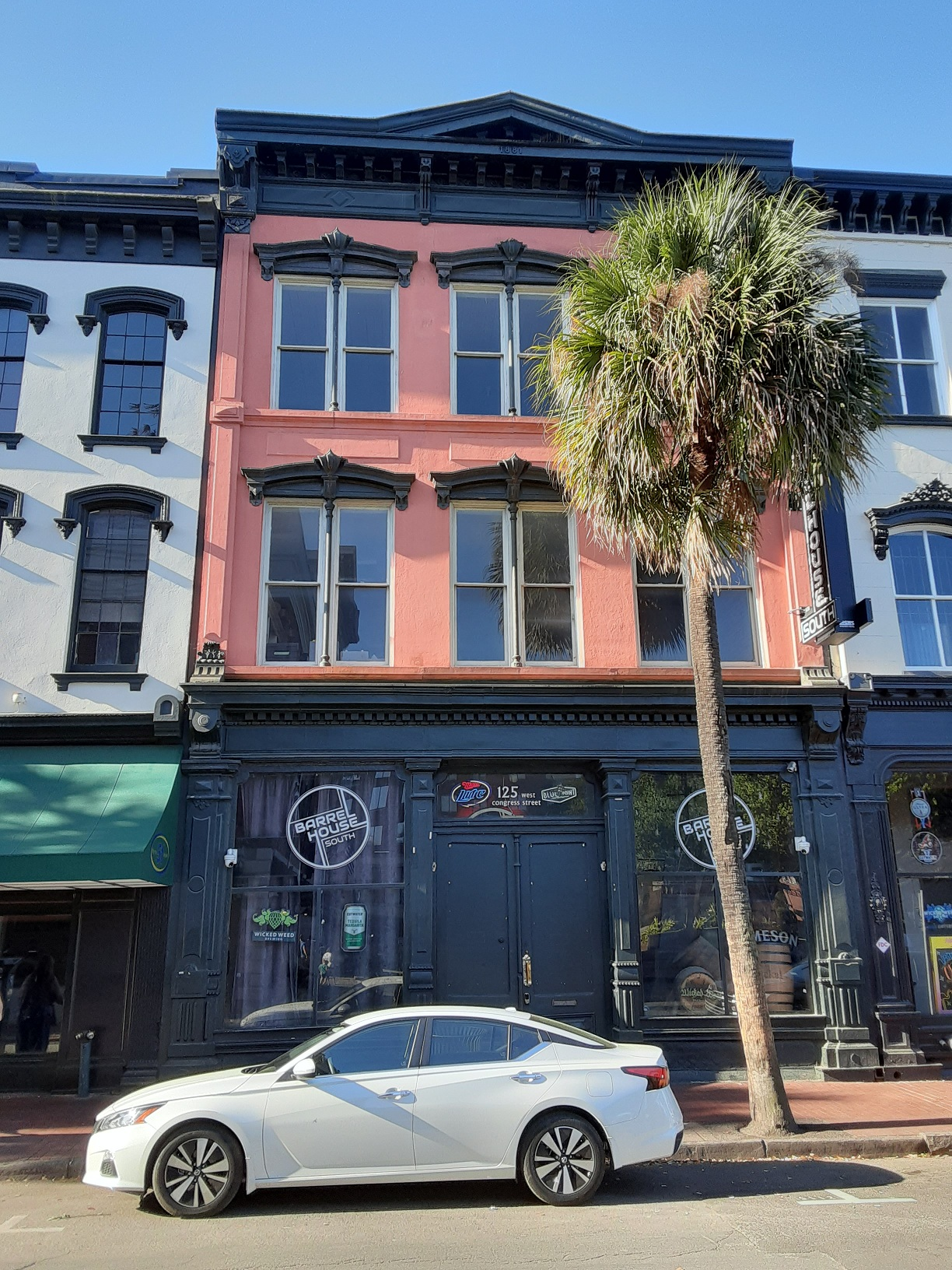
Mohr Brothers Store, 125 West Congress Street

Below is a selection of notable buildings and structures on Congress Street, all in Savannah's Historic District. From west to east:

West Congress Street

- James Brannen Building, 419–423 West Congress Street (1875)
- 409 West Congress Street (1872)
- Augustus Walter Building (I), 405 West Congress Street (1870)
- Augustus Walter Building (II), 401–403 West Congress Street (1867)
- Germania Fire Company, 315 West Congress Street (1871)
- Charles Meitzler Building, 307 West Congress Street (1875)
- Robert McIntire Building, 222–228 West Congress Street (1890)
- Frederick Herb (Estate of) Building, 209 West Congress Street (1855)
- Joseph Bernstein Building, 201–207 West Congress Street (1913)
- Lillenthal and Kohn Store, 127 West Congress Street (1873)
- Mohr Brothers Store, 125 West Congress Street (1881) – built for Amson and Lazarus Mohr
- Lovell and Lattimore Store, 121–123 West Congress Street (1859)
- 103 West Congress Street (1875)
- Thomas Gibbons Range, 102–116 West Congress Street (1820)

East Congress Street

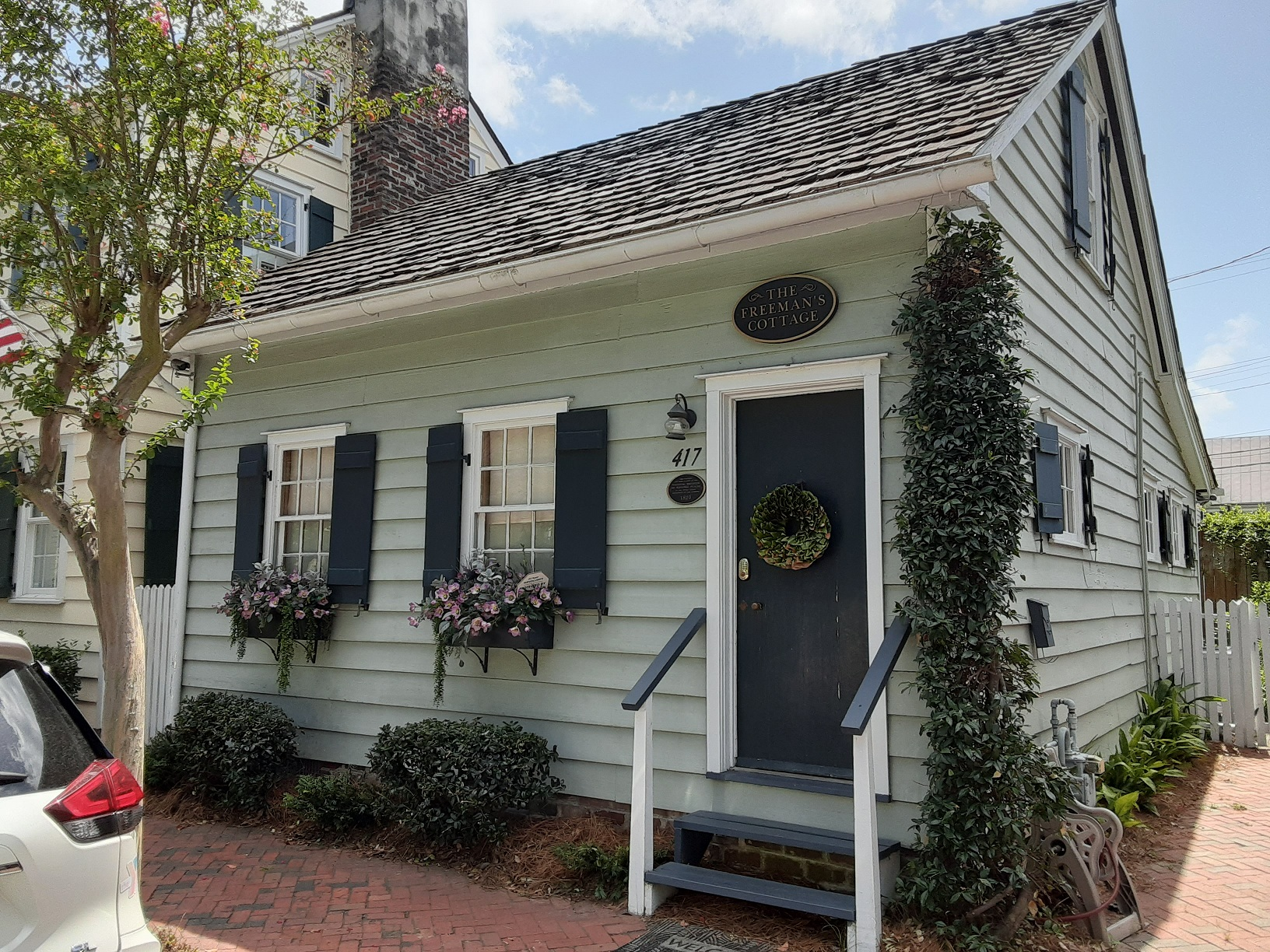
John Ballon Property, 417 East Congress Street

- Manger Building (formerly Hotel Savannah), 7 East Congress Street (1912)
- John Ballon Property (I), 417 East Congress Street (1839)
- John Ballon Property (II), 419 East Congress Street (1839)
- 425 East Congress Street (1799–1808)
- William Gaston House, 511 East Congress Street (c. 1839)
- Isabella Mallery House, 513 East Congress Street (1841)
- Isabella Brower House, 519 East Congress Street (1837–1839)
- Joseph Burke Properties, 541–545 East Congress Street (1860)
- Ann Pinder House, 547 East Congress Street (1831–1835)
