= John Montmollin Warehouse =

Historic building in Savannah, Georgia

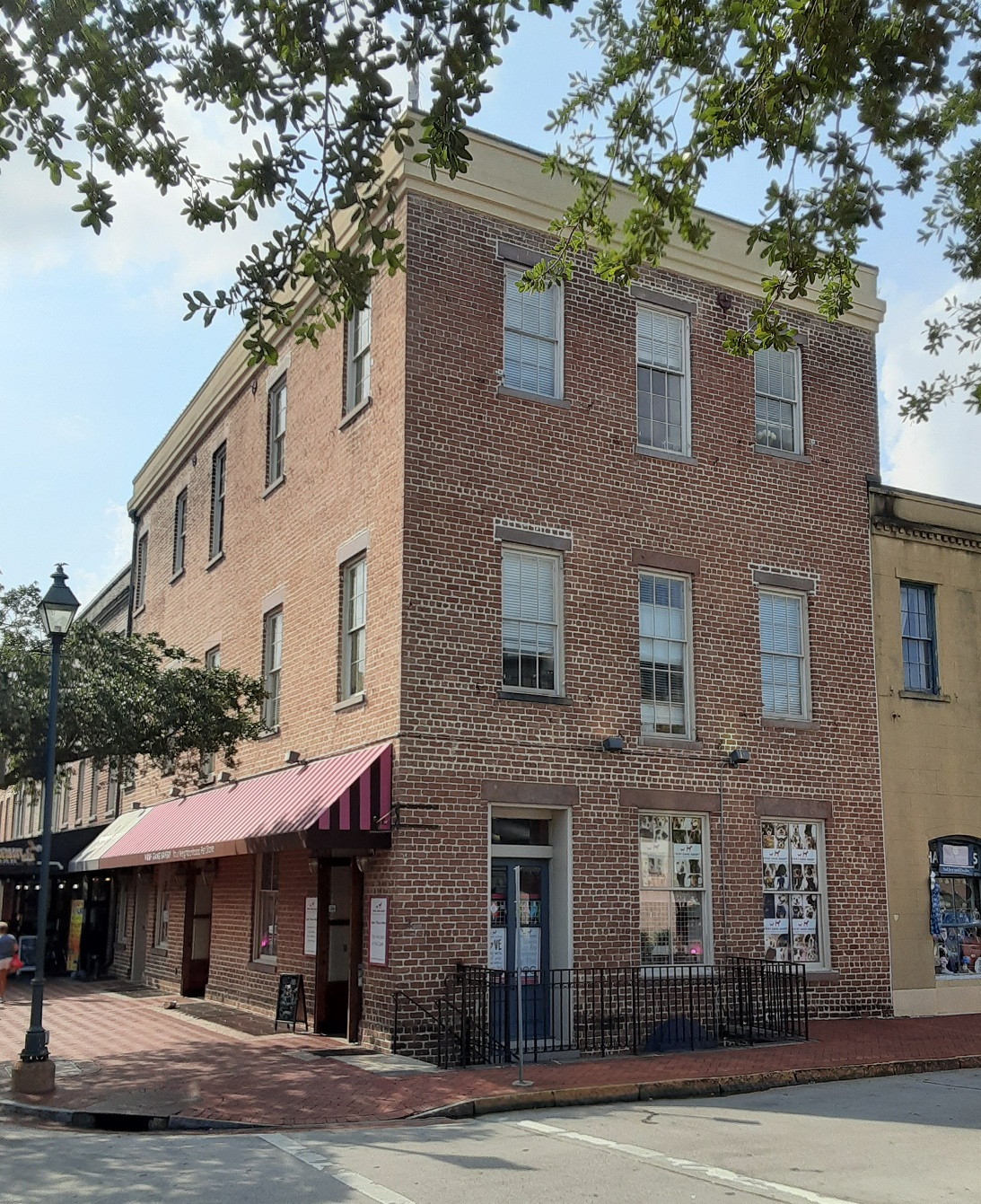
- The building in 2021, viewed from Barnard Street

General information
- Location: Savannah, Georgia, U.S., 21 Barnard Street
- Coordinates: 32.0807779°N 81.0943074°W
- Completed: 1855 (171 years ago)

Technical details
- Floor count: 3

The John Montmollin Warehouse (also known as the John Montmollin Building) is a building in Savannah, Georgia, United States. It is located on Barnard Street in the northwestern civic block of Ellis Square, in Savannah's City Market. It was constructed in 1855, 35 years after the first building on the square, the Thomas Gibbons Range.

Owned by John S. Montmollin, between the mid-1850s and 1864 the building was used to trade African American slaves, even after president Abraham Lincoln signed the Emancipation Proclamation. They were held there until their fate became known. The building's third floor was owned by Alexander Bryan, who later took over the whole of the premises after Montmollin's death in June 1859. The building was liberated by U.S. troops in the course of General Sherman's "March to the Sea" in November and December 1864.

== See also ==
- Buildings in Savannah Historic District
- Slave markets and slave jails in the United States
