= Barnard Street =

Prominent street in Savannah, Georgia

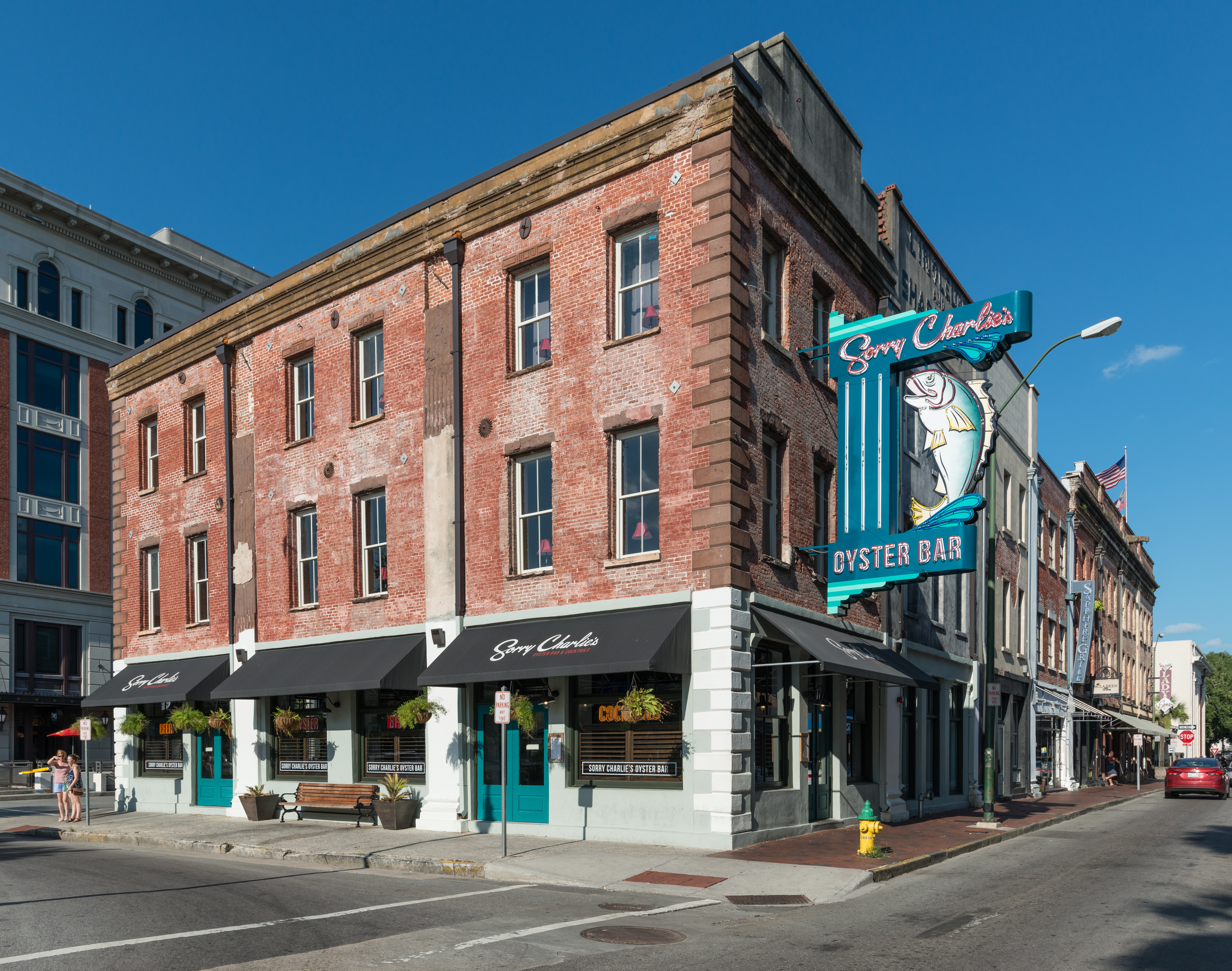
- The Barnard Street elevation of the Thomas Gibbons Range in Savannah's Ellis Square
- Namesake: Sir John Barnard
- Length: 2.54 mi (4.09 km)
- Location: Savannah, Georgia, U.S.
- North end: West Bay Street
- South end: West 52nd Street

Barnard Street is a prominent street in Savannah, Georgia, United States. Located between Jefferson Street to the west and Whitaker Street to the east, it runs for about 2.54 miles (4.09 km) from West Bay Street in the north to West 52nd Street in the south. The street is named for Sir John Barnard, Lord Mayor of London in 1737 and 1740. Its northern section passes through the Savannah Historic District, a National Historic Landmark District.

Barnard Street goes around five of Savannah's 22 squares. They are (from north to south):

- Ellis Square
- Telfair Square
- Orleans Square
- Pulaski Square
- Chatham Square

== Notable buildings and structures ==
Below is a selection of notable buildings and structures on Barnard Street, all in Savannah's Historic District. From north to south:

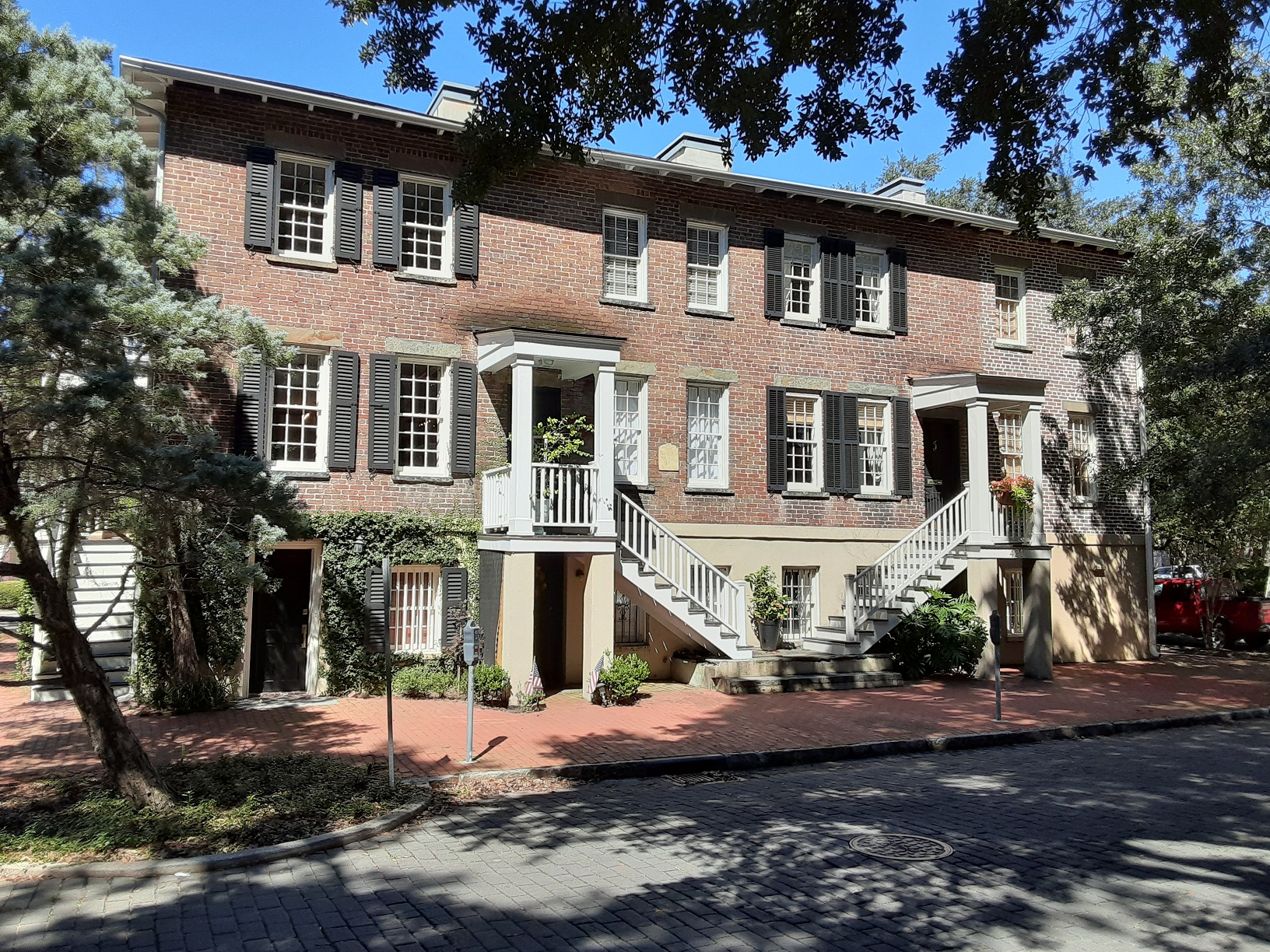
William Kine Property, 419–425 Barnard Street, built in 1854

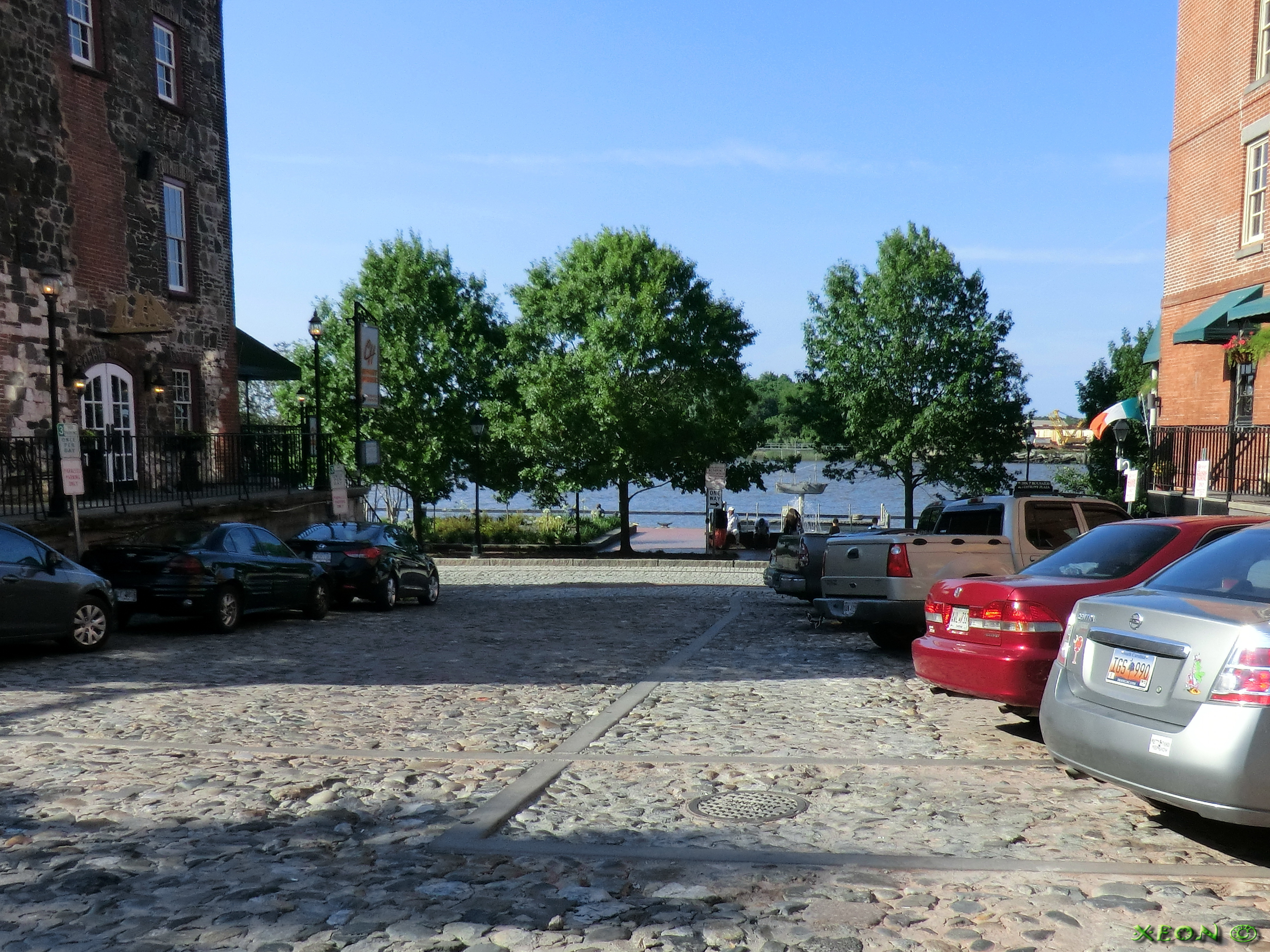
The Barnard Street Ramp leading down to River Street

- David Dillon Building, 19 Barnard Street (1855; later the Bryan Free School)
- John Montmollin Warehouse, 21 Barnard Street (1855)
- Lawrence/Shaffer Building, 23–25 Barnard Street (1848)
- 30–38 Barnard Street (c. 1920)
- Henry Hayme Building, 114 Barnard Street (1889)
- Telfair Academy, 121 Barnard Street (1820 and 1880)
- Trinity Methodist Church, 127 Barnard Street (1848)
- Harper Fowlkes House, 230 Barnard Street (1844 and 1895)
- Bernard Constantine Property, 321 Barnard Street (1845)
- JEA Building, 328 Barnard Street (1914)
- Israel Dasher House, 331 Barnard Street (1844)
- Anthony and Mary Basler Property, 344 Barnard Street (1890)
- William Kine Property, 419–425 Barnard Street (1854)
- William Bradley House, 424 Barnard Street (1859)
- William Bradley Commercial Property, 426 Barnard Street (1868)
- Dasher Row, 433–441 Barnard Street (1882)
- Blues Range, 443–455 Barnard Street (1852)
- The Barnard Street School (1901; main entrance on West Taylor Street)
- Josephine Mathews Property, 607 Barnard Street (1894)
- Frank Keilback House, 609 Barnard Street (1890)
- Adrian Robertson House, 612 Barnard Street (1886)
- Matthew O'Connell House, 616 Barnard Street (1888)
- John Hamlet Property, 701–703 Barnard Street (1870)
- Emma Hamlet Property, 705–707 Barnard Street (1856)

The Bulloch–Habersham House stood on Barnard Street, in the southwestern trust lot of Orleans Square, at the corner of West Perry Street, between 1820 and 1916.
