= Ellis Square (Savannah, Georgia) =

Public square in Savannah, Georgia

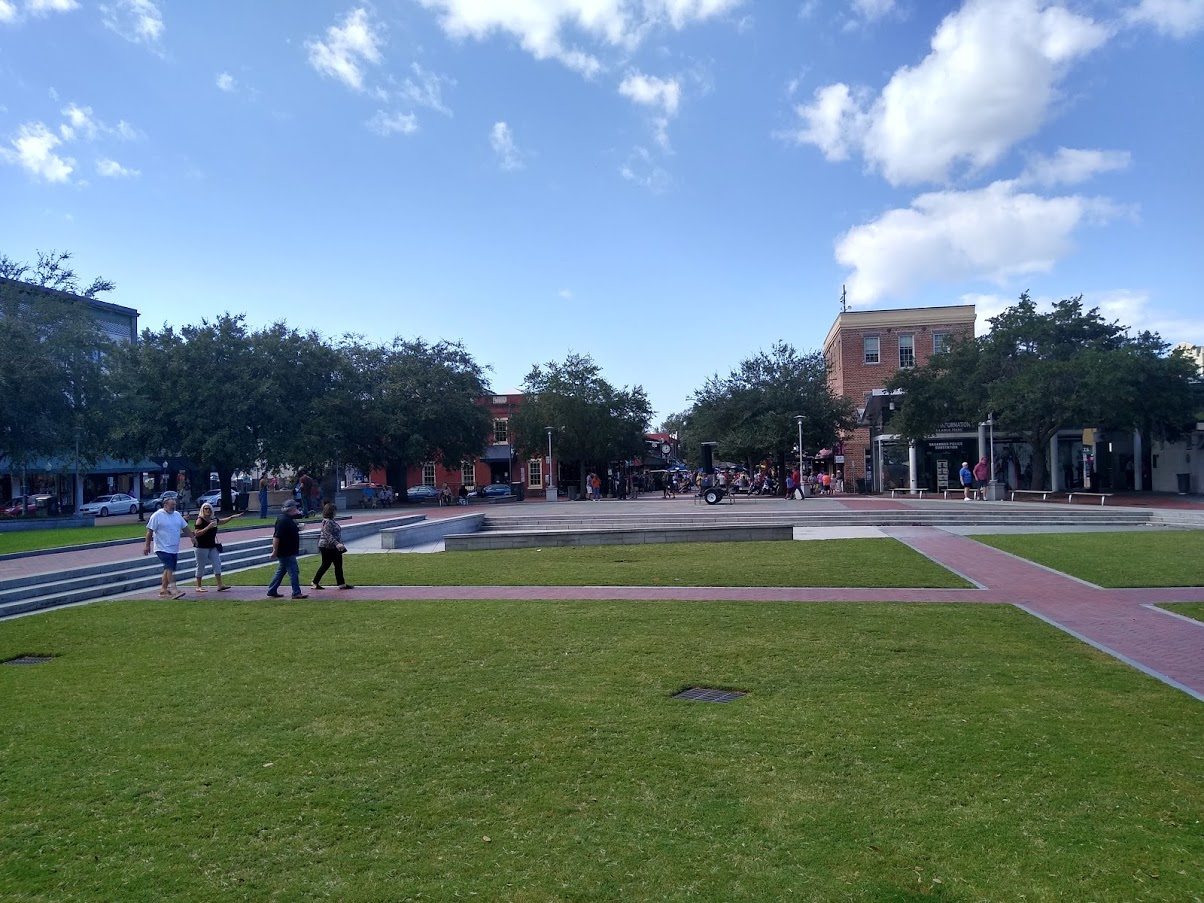
- A 2020 view, looking west down St. Julian Street
- Interactive map of Ellis Square
- Former names: Decker Square; Marketplace Square
- Namesake: Sir Henry Ellis
- Maintained by: City of Savannah
- Location: Savannah, Georgia, U.S.
- Coordinates: 32.0805°N 81.0938°W
- North: Barnard Street
- East: West St. Julian Street
- South: Barnard Street
- West: West St. Julian Street

Construction
- Completion: 1733 (293 years ago); 2010 (16 years ago) (rededicated)

Ellis Square is one of the 22 squares of Savannah, Georgia, United States. It is located in the northernmost row of the city's five rows of squares, on Barnard Street and West St. Julian Street, and was one of the first four squares laid out. Today, it marks the western end of City Market. The square is east of Franklin Square, west of Johnson Square and north of Telfair Square. The oldest building on the square is the Thomas Gibbons Range, at 102–116 West Congress Street, which dates to 1820.

Decker Square, as it was originally known, was laid out in 1733 as part of Decker Ward, the third ward created in Savannah. The ward and square were named for Sir Matthew Decker, one of the Trustees for the Establishment of the Colony of Georgia in America, Commissioner of funds collection for the Trust, director and governor of the East India Company, and member of Parliament. The square was renamed for Sir Henry Ellis, the second Royal Governor of the colony of Georgia.

It was also known as Marketplace Square, as from the 1730s through the 1950s it served as a center of commerce and was home to four successive market houses. Prior to Union General Sherman's arrival in December 1864, it was also the site of a slave market with some indications of slaves being held under the northwest corner of the square. A large brick building, now known as the John Montmollin Building, was built in 1855 to house the slave market, facing south on Barnard Street.

In 1954, the city signed a 50-year lease with the Savannah Merchants Cooperative Parking Association, allowing the association to raze the existing structure and construct a parking garage to serve the City Market retail project. Anger over the demolition of the market house helped spur the historic preservation movement (most notably the Historic Savannah Foundation) in Savannah. The outer structure of this city market building influenced the design of the Kroger grocery store on Gwinnett Street and the Publix grocery store in the Twelve Oaks shopping center on Abercorn Street.

When the garage's lease expired in 2004, the city began plans to restore Ellis Square. The old parking garage was demolished in 2006 to make way for a new public square (park) that features open spaces for public concerts, as well as an underground parking garage on Whitaker Street. The underground facility was completed and formally dedicated in January 2009.

Ellis Square officially reopened at a dedication ceremony held on March 11, 2010.

The six-story Cay Building, at 22 Barnard Street, was completed in 2012.

== Markers and structures ==
| Object | Image | Note |
|---|---|---|
| Johnny Mercer statue | | A bronze statue, by Susie Chisholm, of songwriter-lyricist Johnny Mercer, a native Savannahian, was formally unveiled in Ellis Square on November 18, 2009. |
| Street clock | | A street clock on West St. Julian Street, on the western side of the square, was a donation from Rotary International. In the background of this photo, in the northeastern civic/trust block, is the Cay Building. |

== Constituent buildings ==
Each building below is in one of the eight blocks around the square composed of four residential "tything" blocks and four civic ("trust") blocks, now known as the Oglethorpe Plan. They are listed with construction years where known.

Northwestern civic/trust block

- David Dillon Building, 19 Barnard Street (1855)
- John Montmollin Warehouse, 21 Barnard Street (1855)
- Lawrence–Shaffer Building, 23–25 Barnard Street (1845)
- James McIntire Building, 222–236 West St. Julian Street (1855)
- 20 Jefferson Street (1855)
- 1 Jefferson Street (1893)

Southwestern civic/trust block

- 25–29 Barnard Street (1848)
- Robert McIntire Building, 222–228 West Congress Street (1890)

Southwestern residential/tything block

- 35 Barnard Street (1913)
- 209 West Congress Street (1855)
- 221–225 West Congress Street (1851)

Southeastern civic/trust block

- Thomas Gibbons Range, 102–116 West Congress Street (1820) – oldest building on the square

Southeastern residential/tything block

- 30–38 Barnard Street (1920–1930)
- Lilenthal and Kohn Store, 127 West Congress Street (1873)
- 125 West Congress Street (1881)
- Lovell and Lattimore Store, 121–123 West Congress Street (1859)
- 103 West Congress Street (1875)
- 37 Whitaker Street (1890)

== Gallery ==
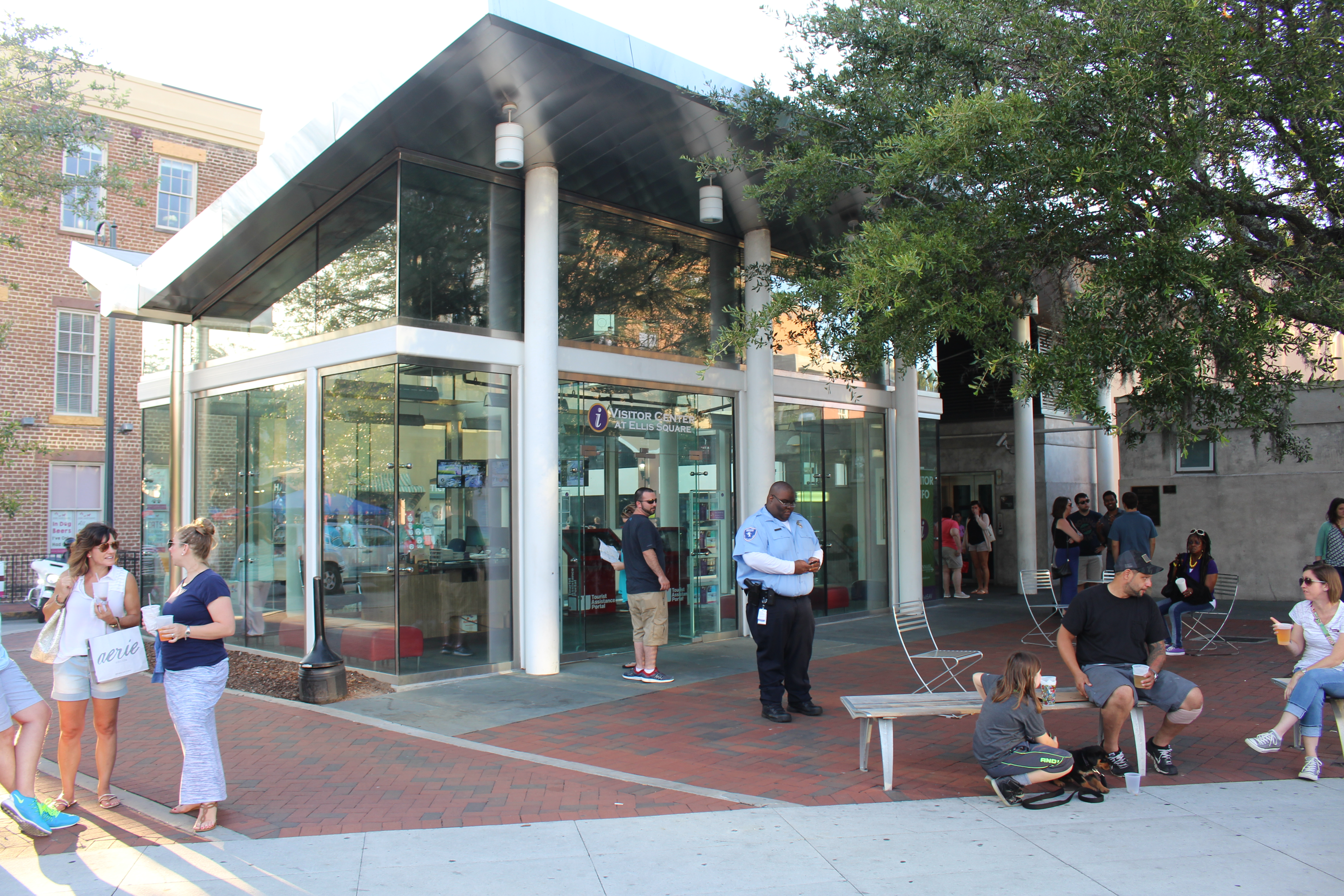
Visitor Center

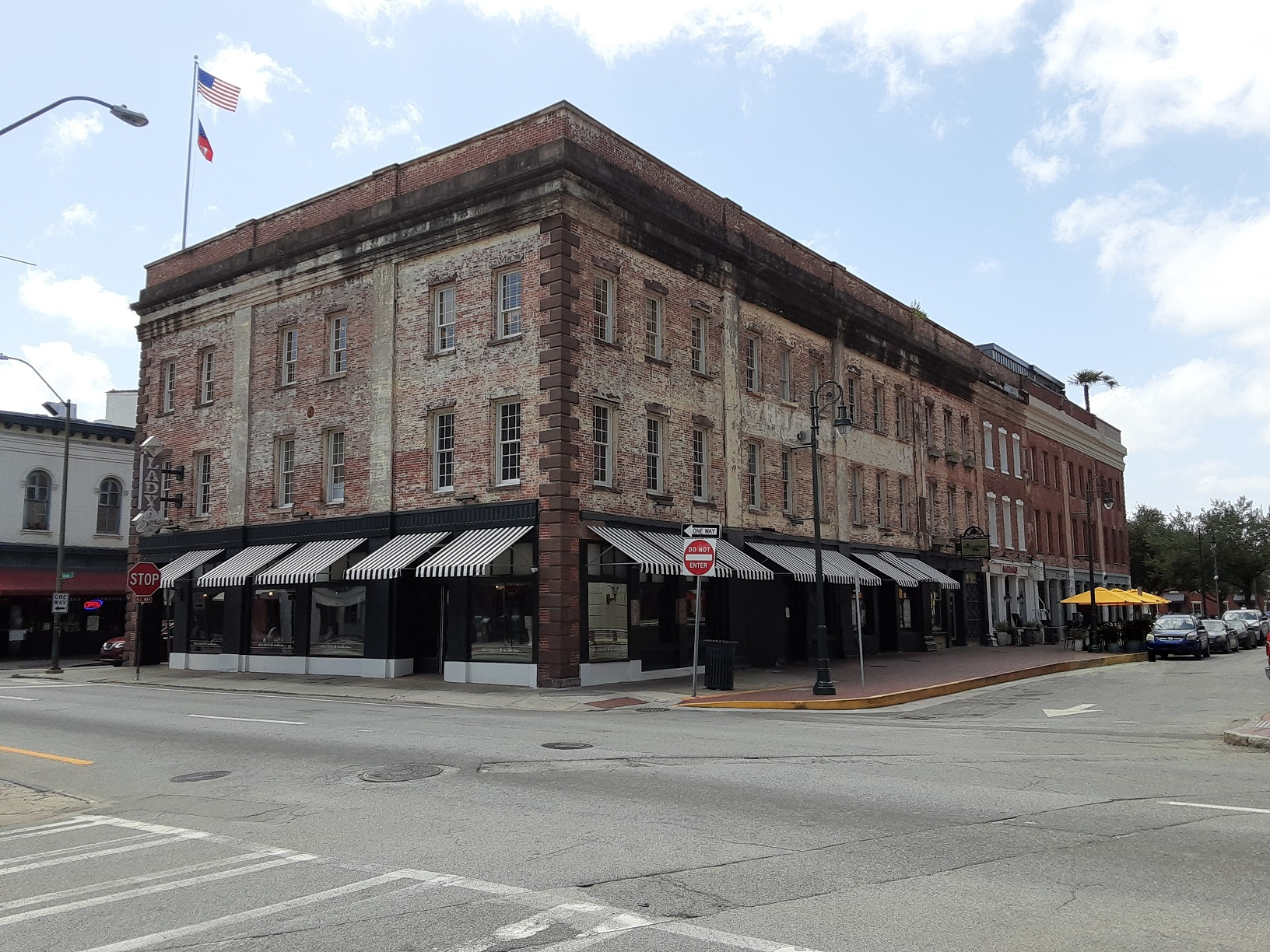
Thomas Gibbons Range, 102–116 West Congress Street

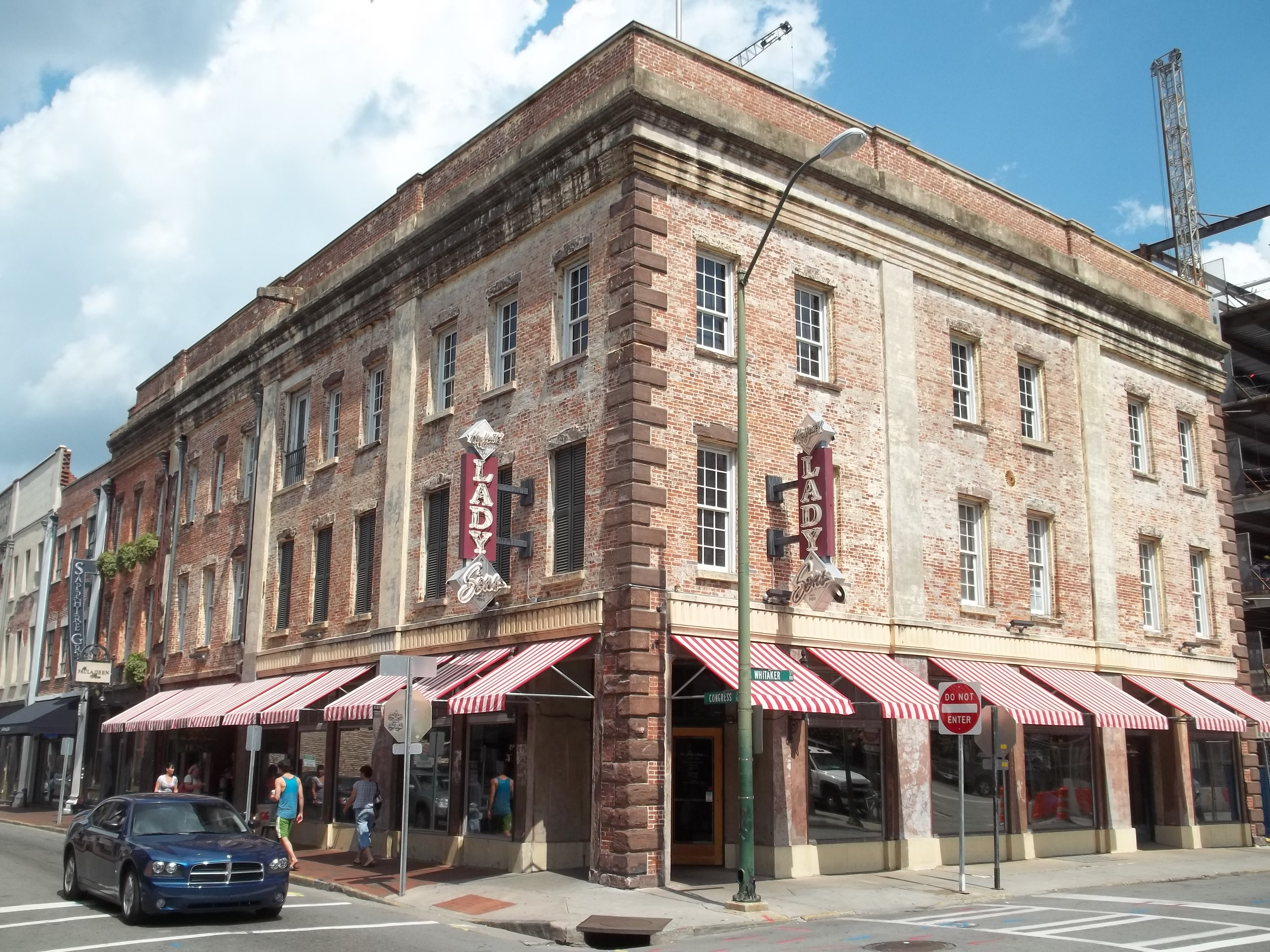
The Lady and Sons, 102 West Congress Street, part of the Thomas Gibbons Range

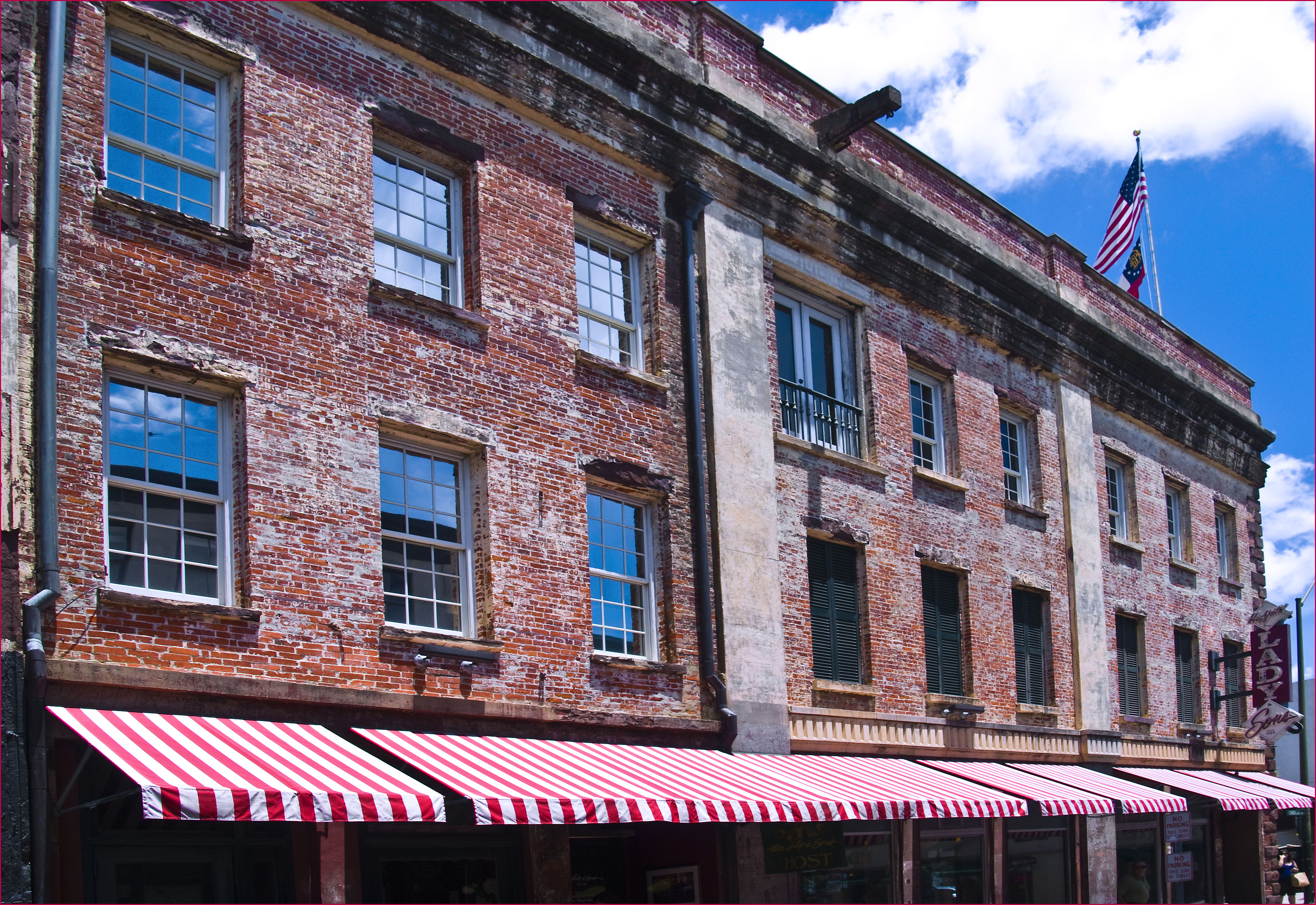
102–104 West Congress Street, part of the Thomas Gibbons Range

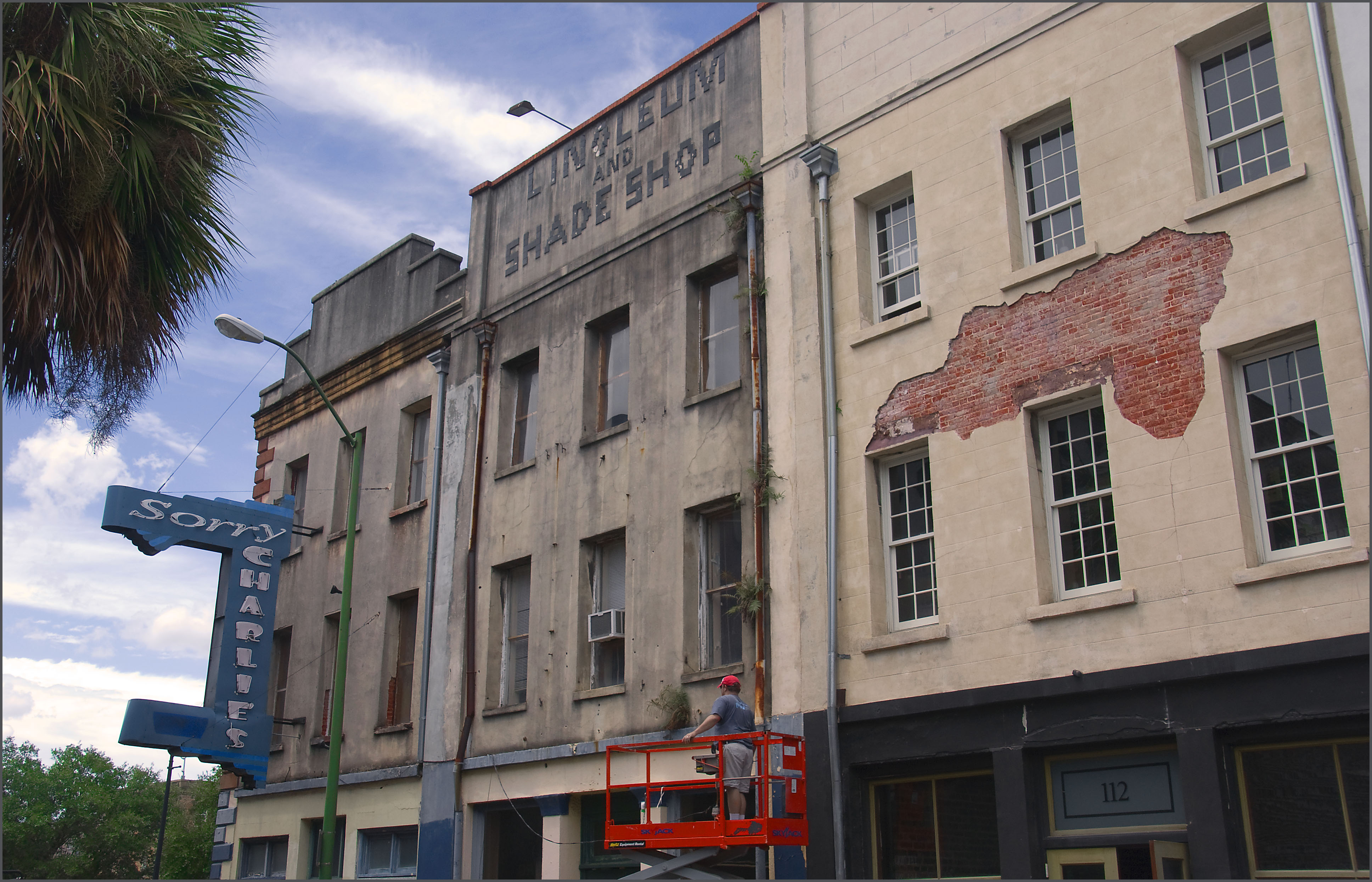
106–116 West Congress Street, part of the Thomas Gibbons Range

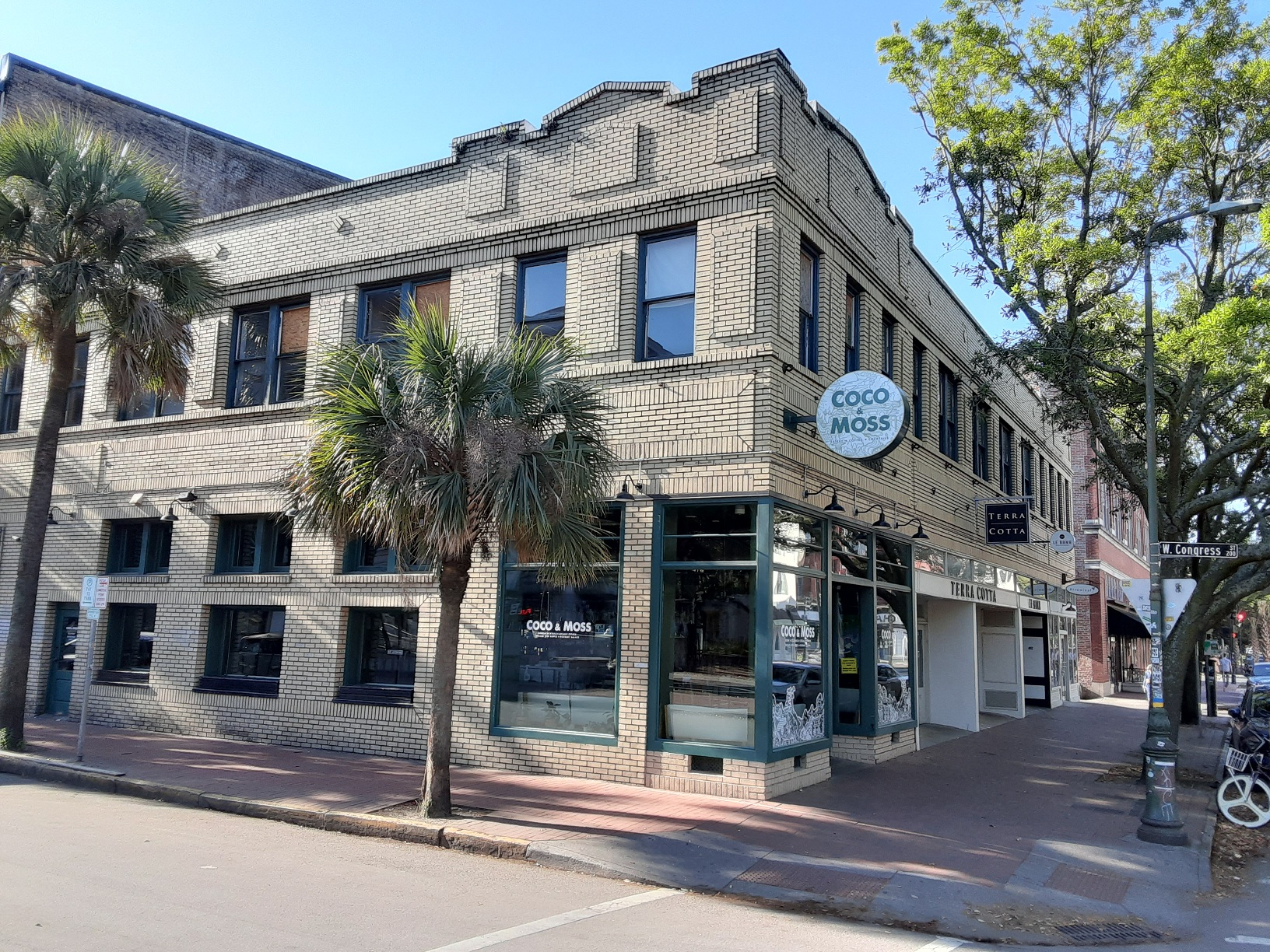
30–38 Barnard Street

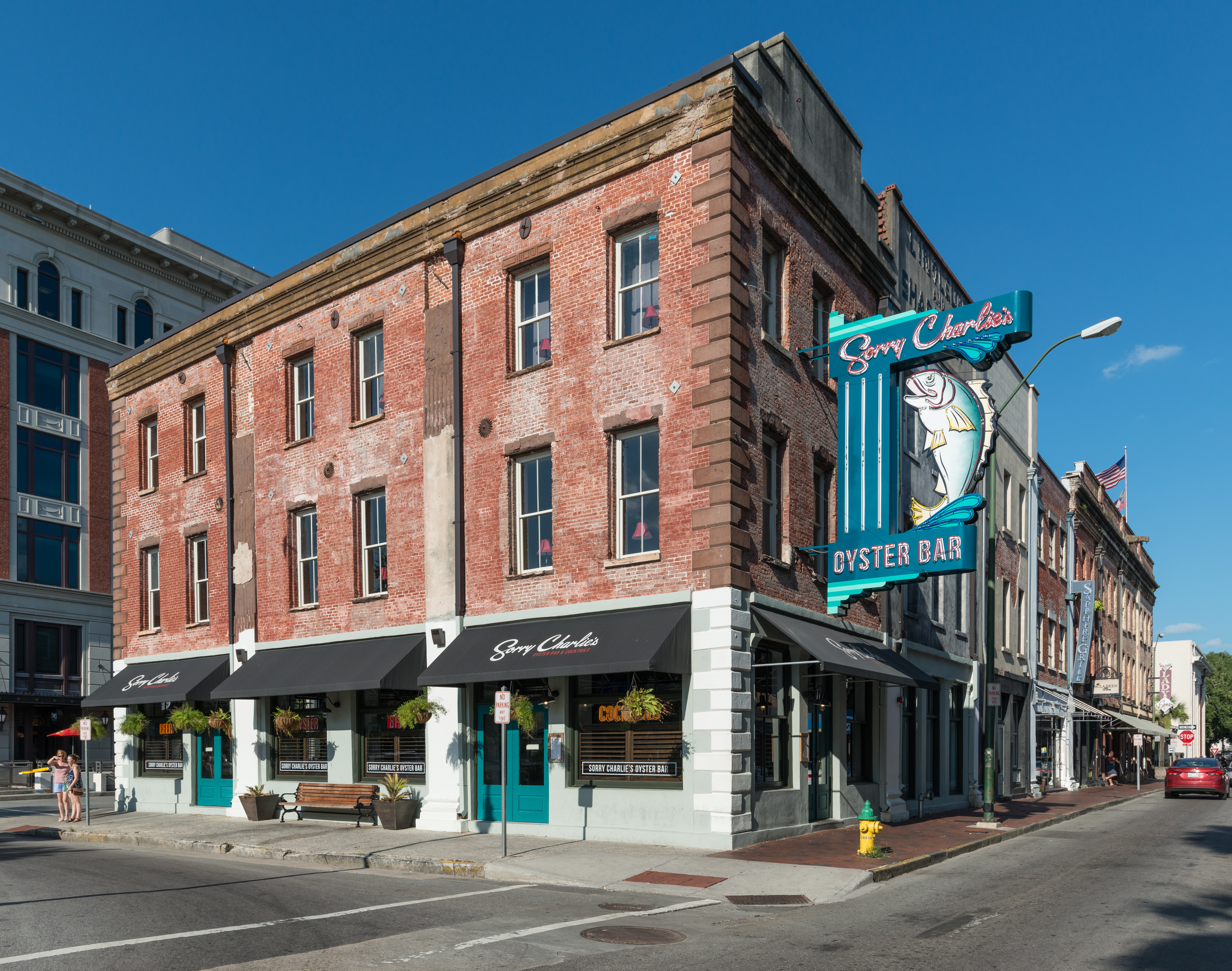
The Barnard Street elevation of the Thomas Gibbons Range

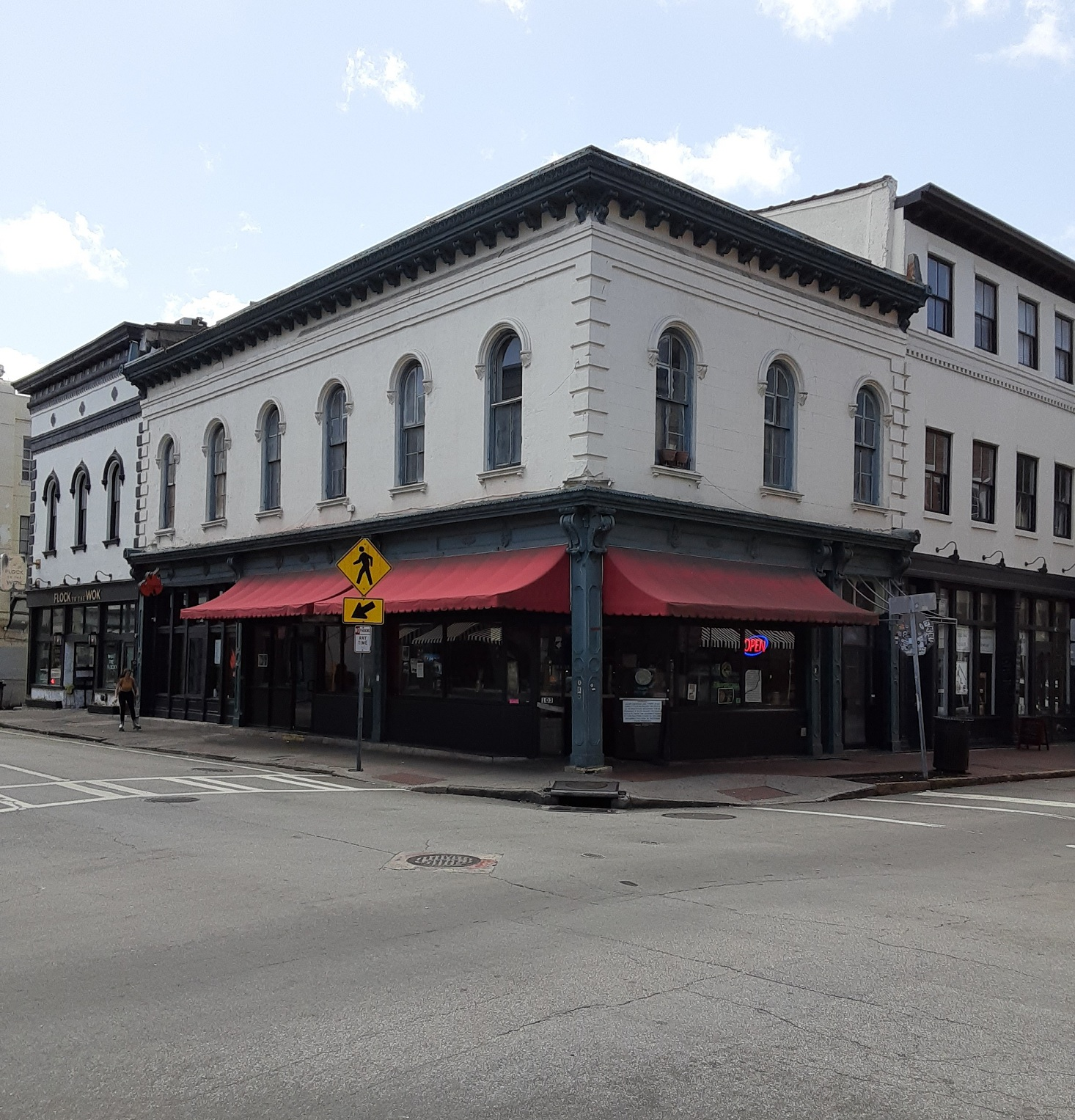
103 West Congress Street

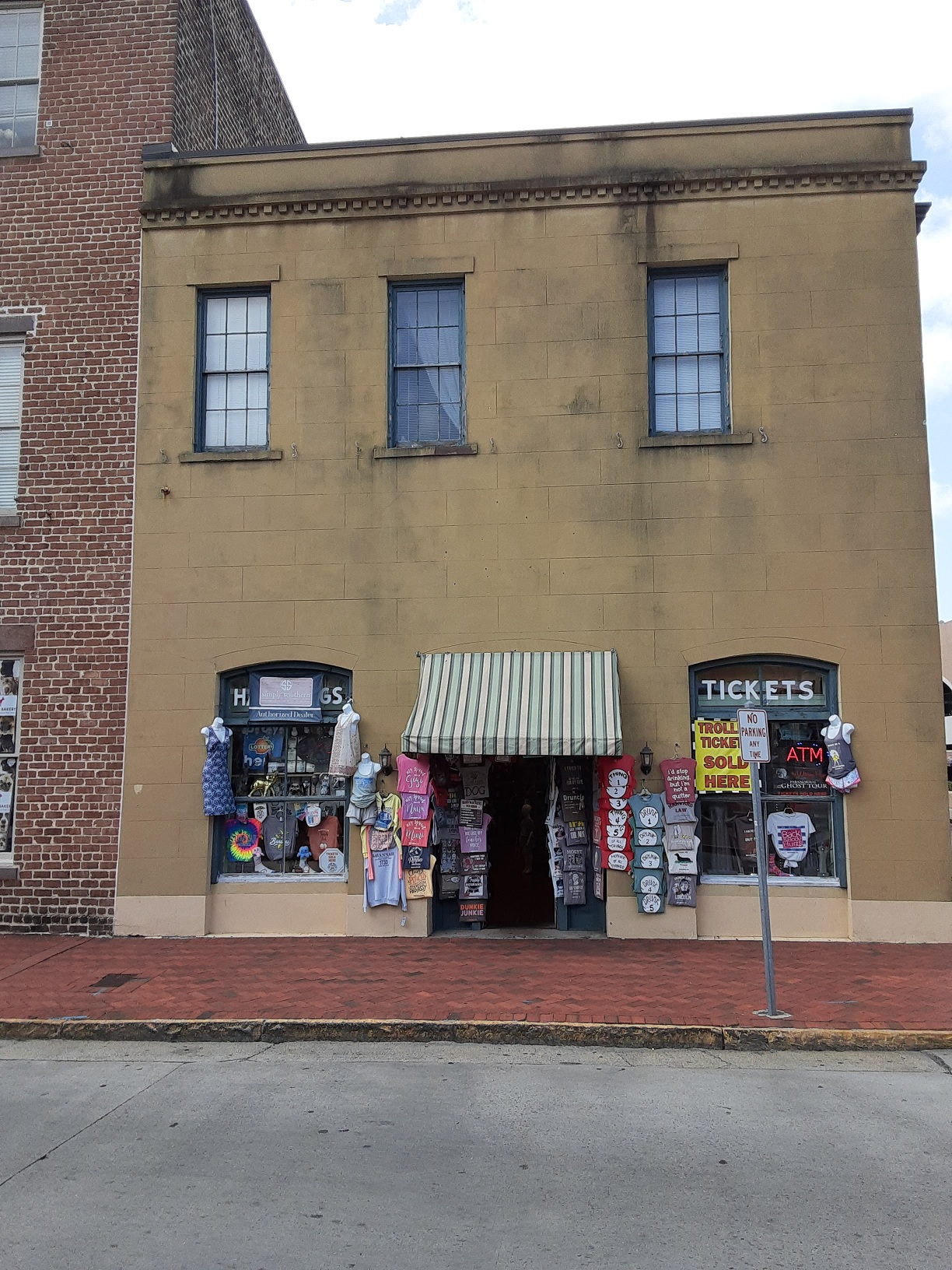
David Dillon Building, 19 Barnard Street

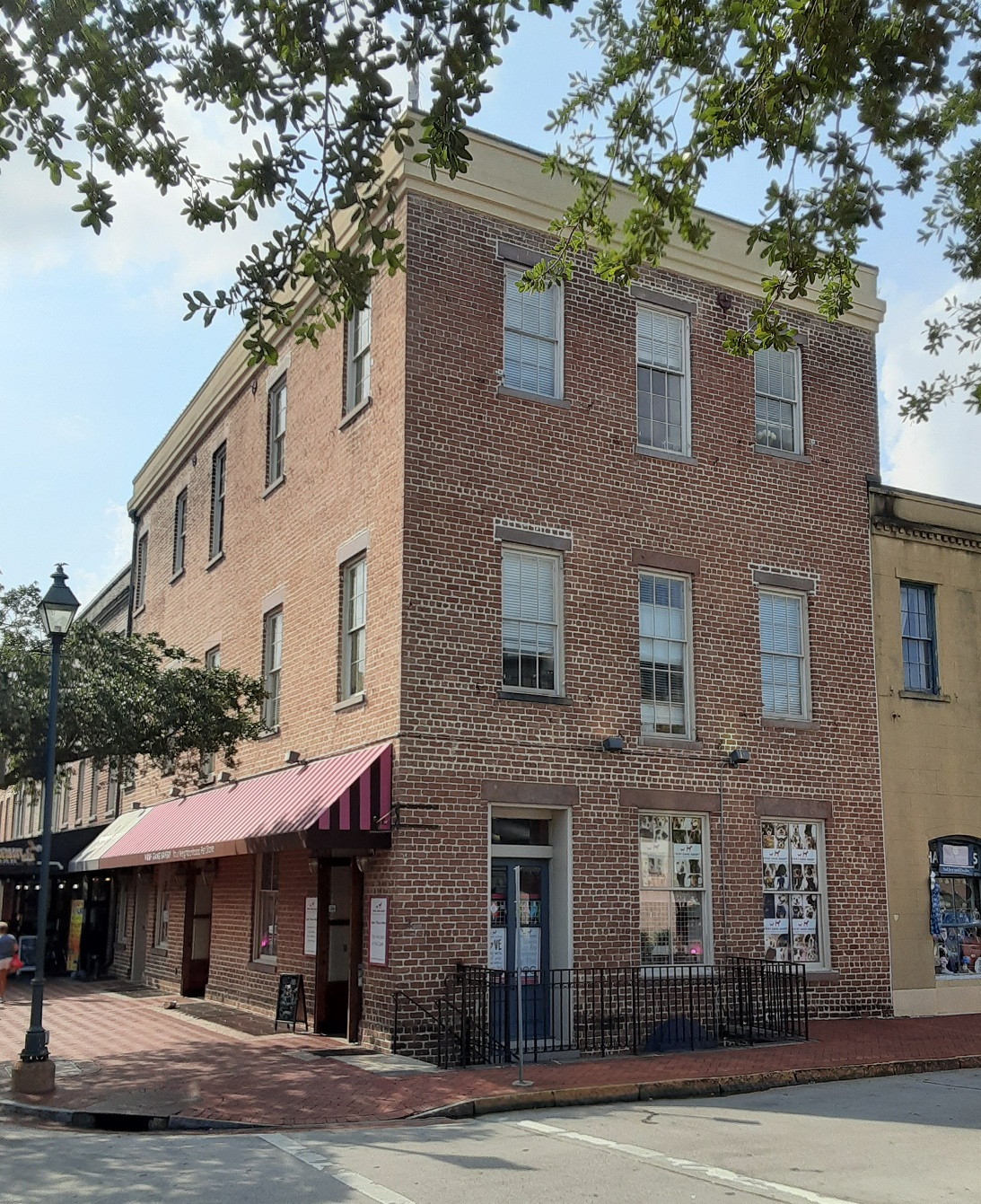
John Montmollin Warehouse, 21 Barnard Street

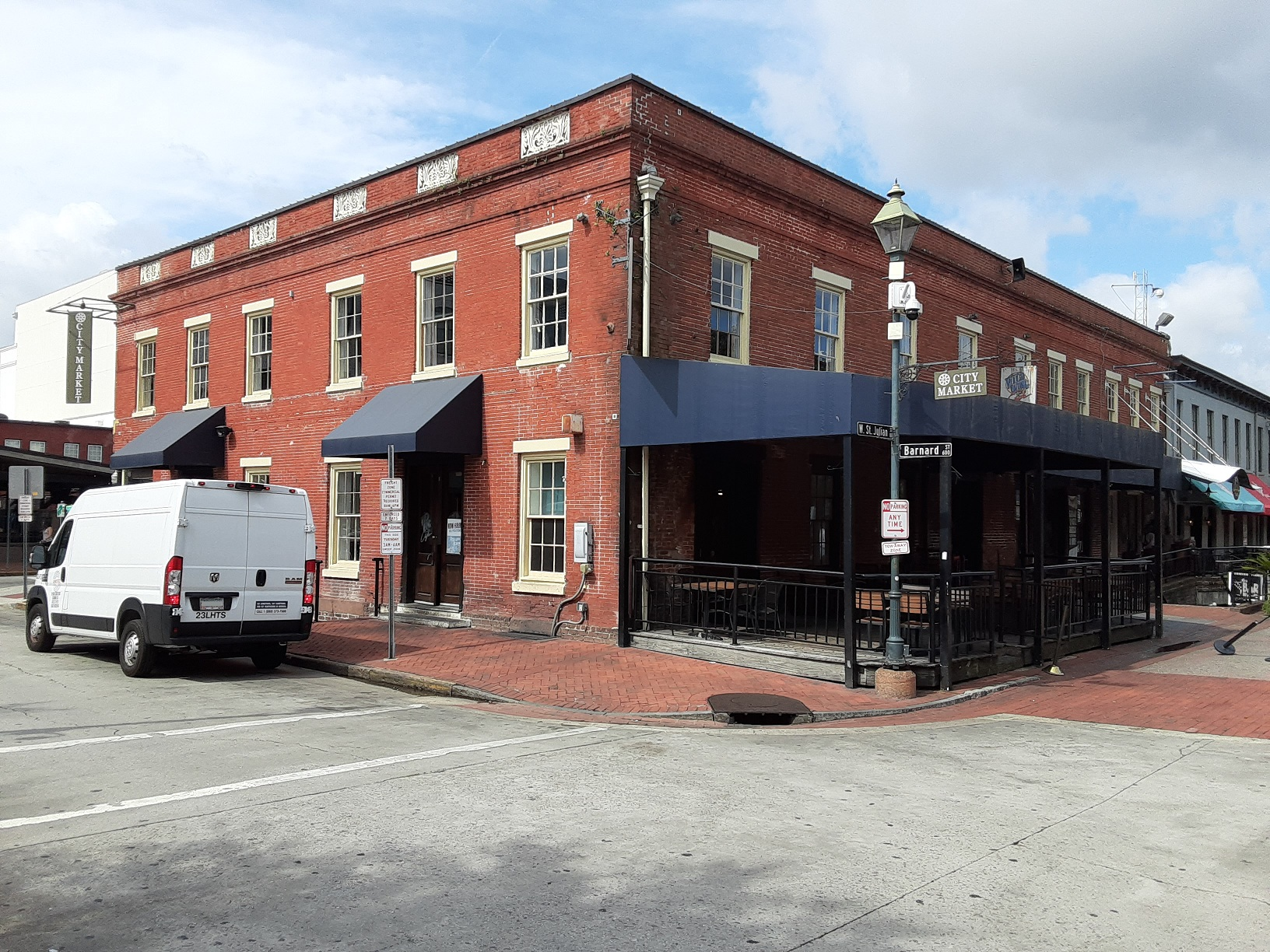
Lawrence–Shaffer Building, 23–25 Barnard Street

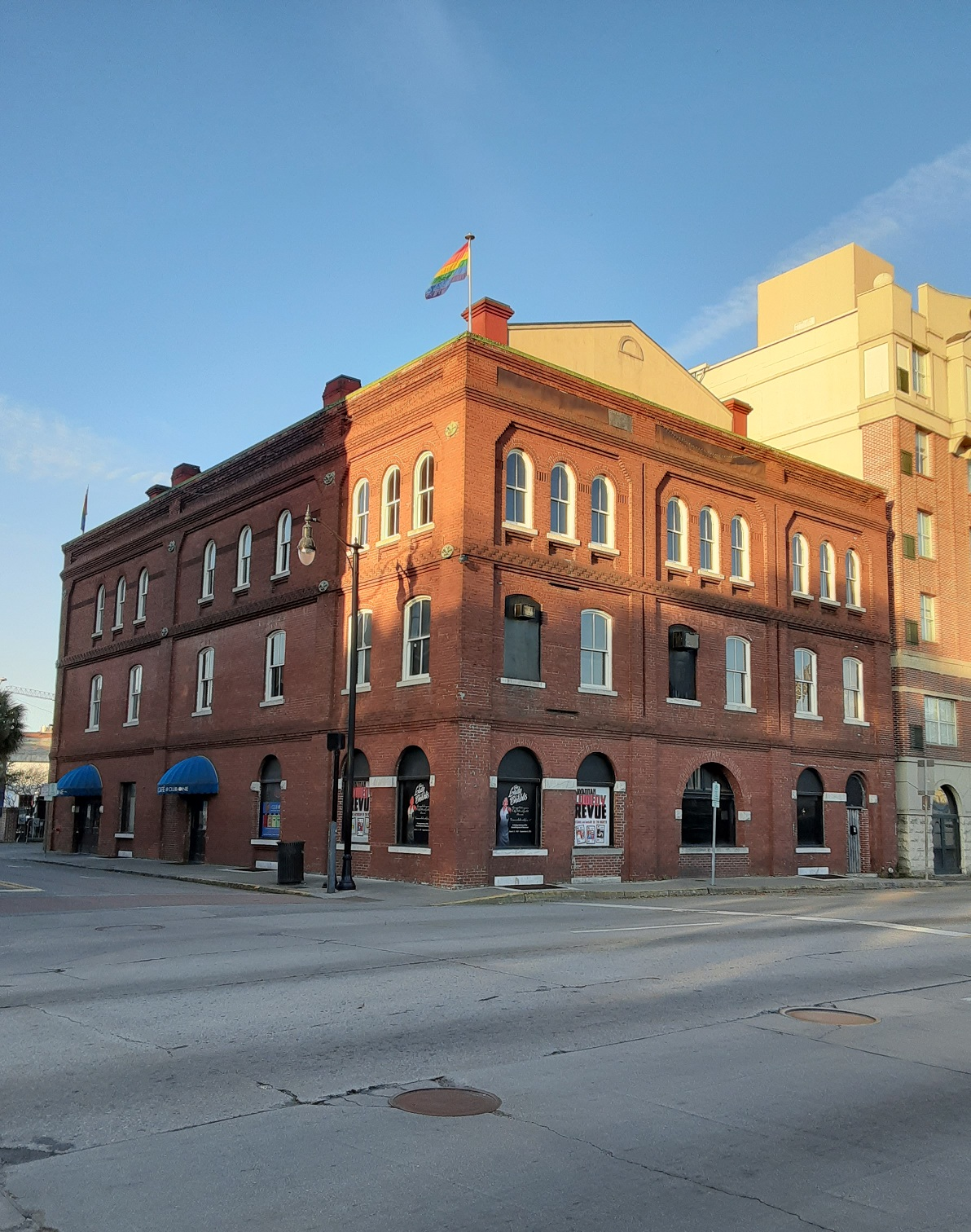
1 Jefferson Street

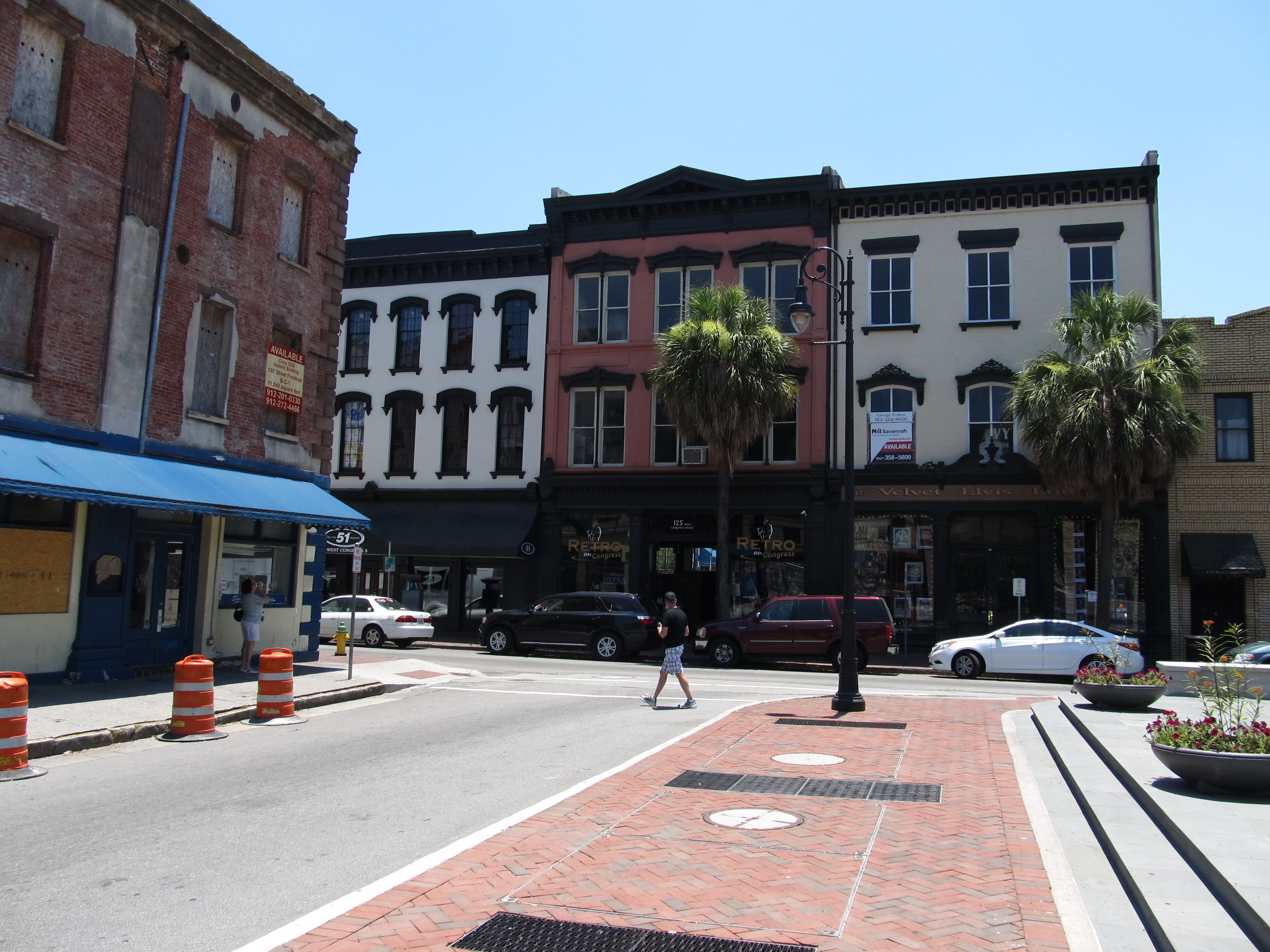
121–123, 125 and 127 West Congress Street

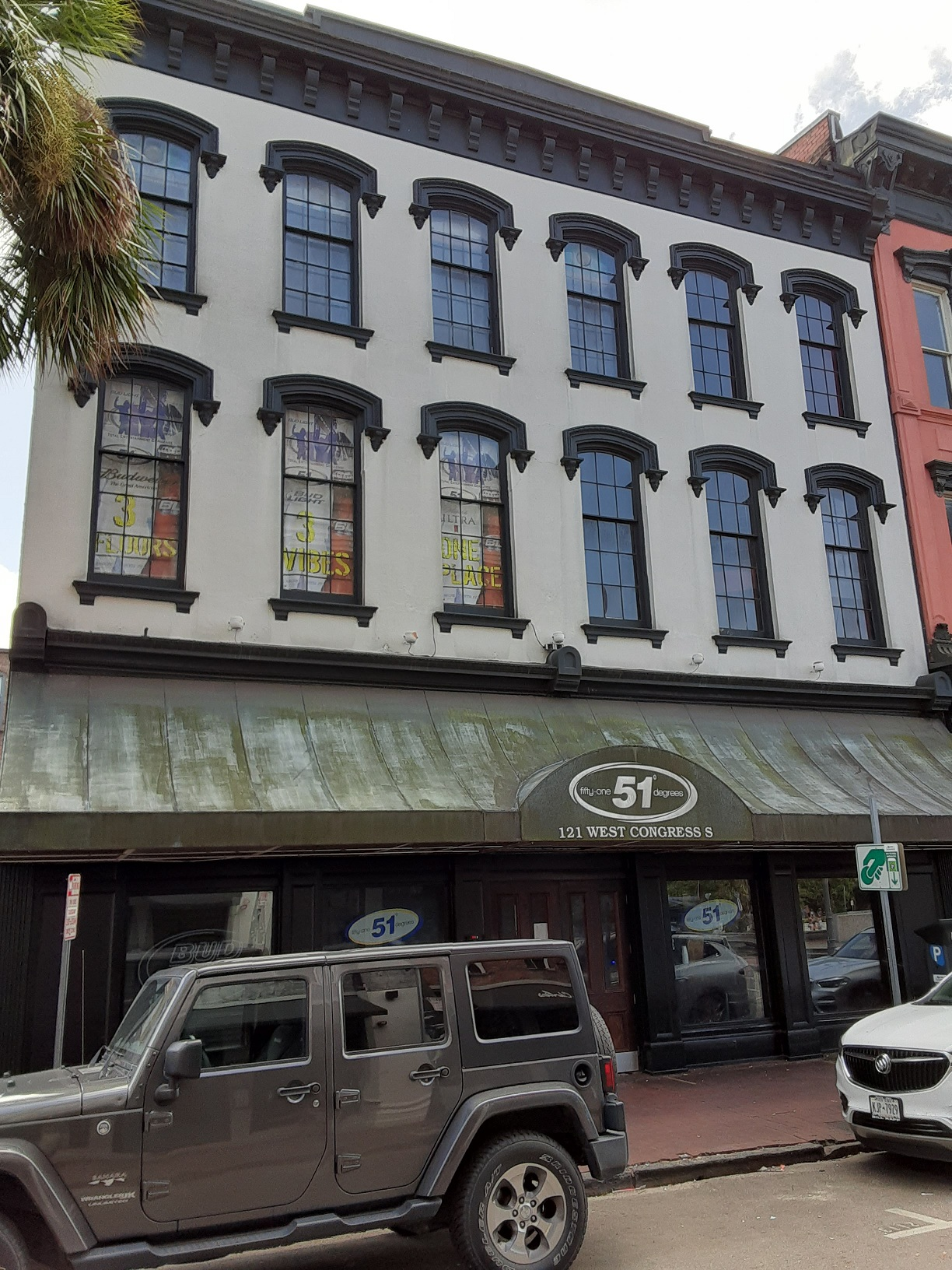
Isolated view of the Lovell and Lattimore Store, 121–123 West Congress Street

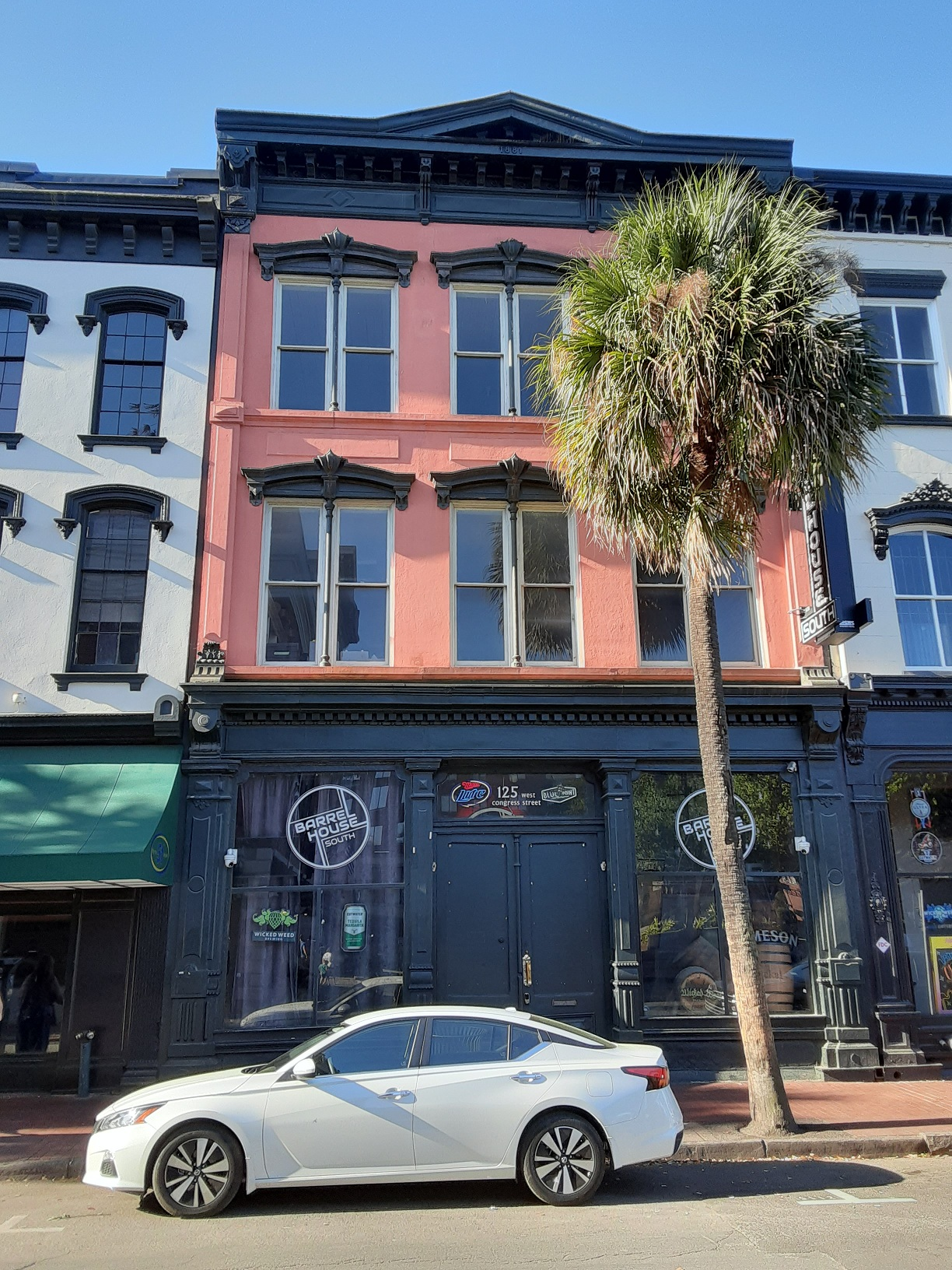
Isolated view of 125 West Congress Street

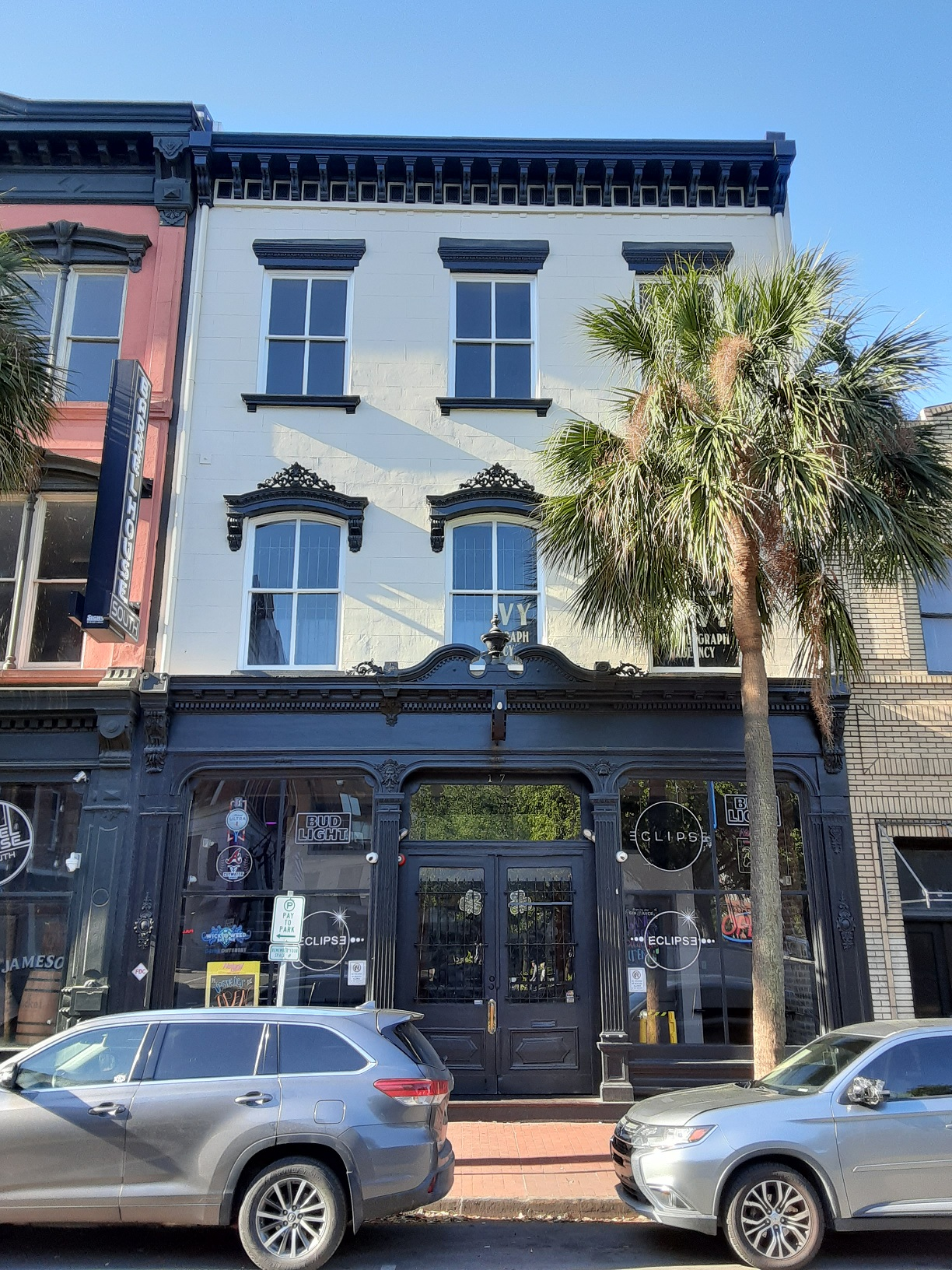
Isolated view of 127 West Congress Street

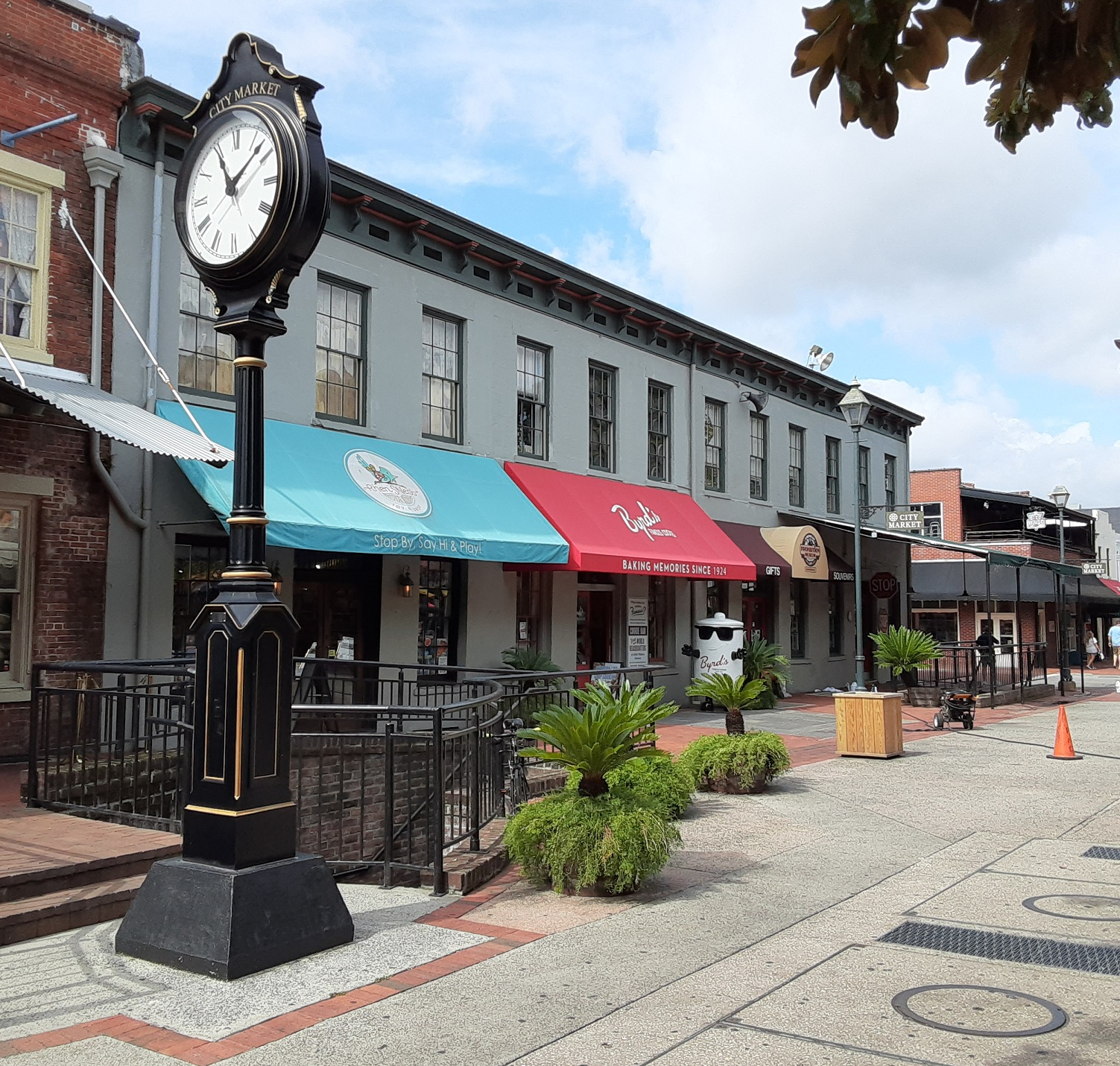
Rear view of the Robert McIntire Building, 222–228 West Congress Street, from West St. Julian Street

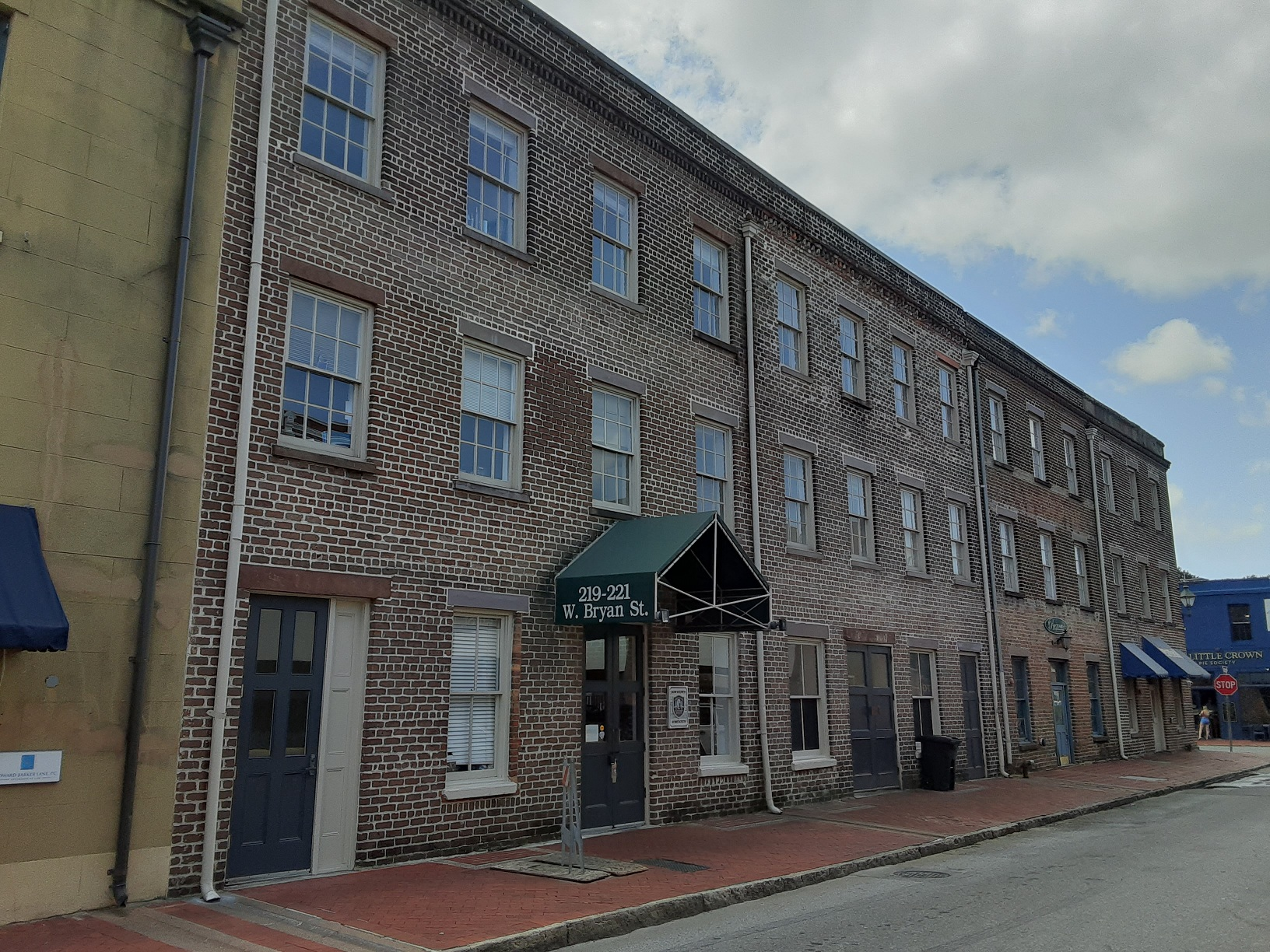
Rear view of the James McIntire Building, 222–236 West St. Julian Street, from West Bryan Street
