= Thomas Gibbons Range =

Historic building in Savannah, Georgia

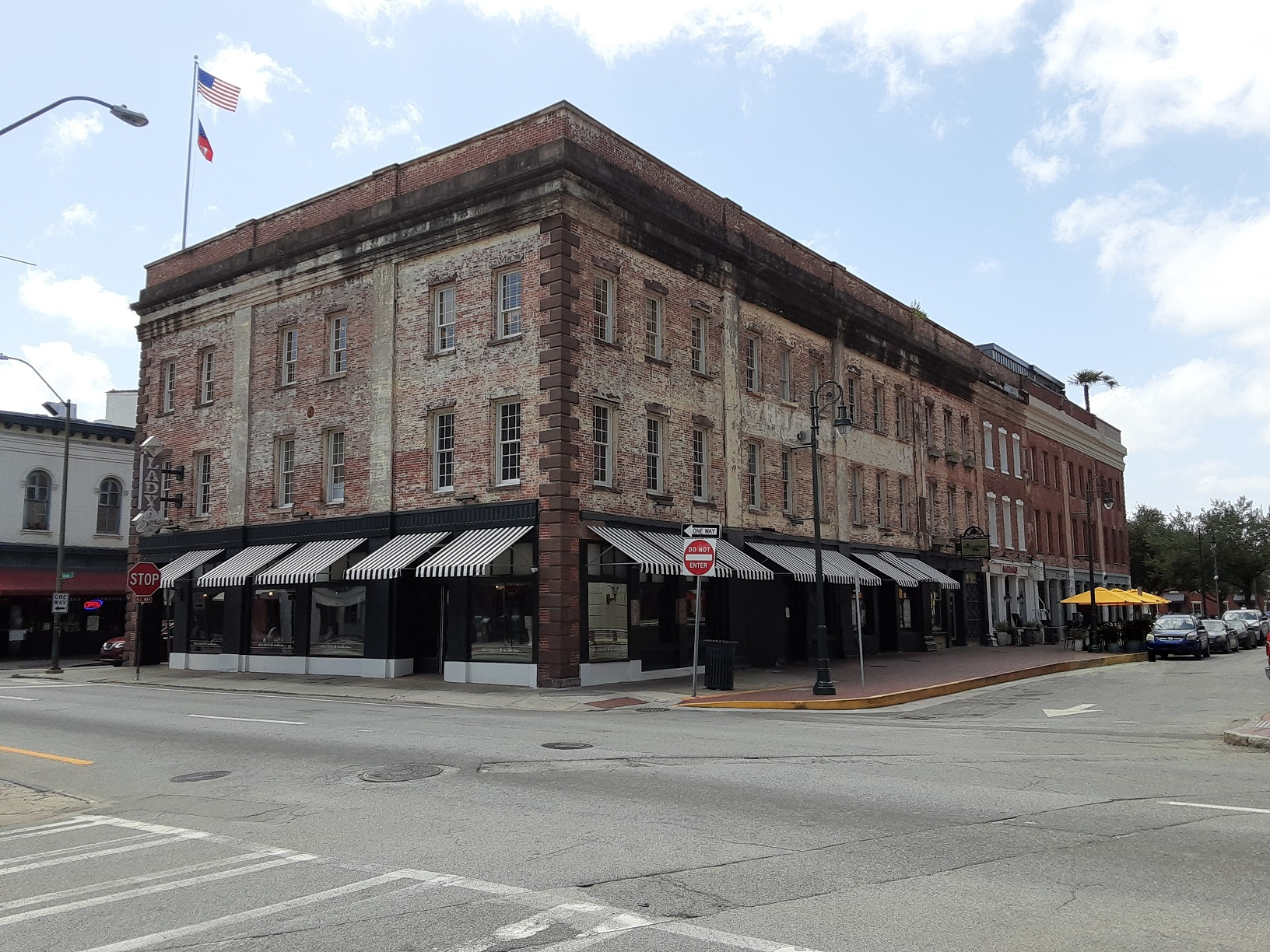
- The building in 2021, viewed from Whitaker Street
- Interactive map of the Thomas Gibbons Range area

General information
- Location: Savannah, Georgia, U.S., 102–116 West Congress Street
- Coordinates: 32.0801484°N 81.093138°W
- Completed: 1820 (206 years ago)

Technical details
- Floor count: 3

Design and construction
- Architect: William Gibbons

The Thomas Gibbons Range is a building in Savannah, Georgia, United States. Now comprising eight properties, it is located on West Congress Street, in the southeastern civic block of Ellis Square in Savannah's City Market. Built in 1820, it is the oldest building on the square, and the oldest operating commercial building in Savannah. It is part of the Savannah Historic District and was built, towards the end of his life, for Thomas Gibbons (1757–1826), a planter, politician, lawyer, steamboat owner and the plaintiff in Gibbons vs. Ogden. The building was erected by his son William. Gibbons had owned the lot since 1809.

In 1943, Frank C. Mathews purchased the property at number 116, where he established Mathews Seafood. The following year, he purchased the adjacent number 114, and a local signmaker was commissioned to make a neon fish sign for the restaurant, now known as Sorry Charlie's Oyster Bar. The sign became a popular landmark, and the Historic Savannah Foundation designated it a historic artifact. (This is not the sign on the building today.) Sorry Charlie's expanded again, into 112 West Congress Street, in 2018.

The Lady & Sons, a restaurant owned by Paula Deen, occupied number 102, at the Whitaker Street end of the building, between 1996 and 2025.

== Gallery ==
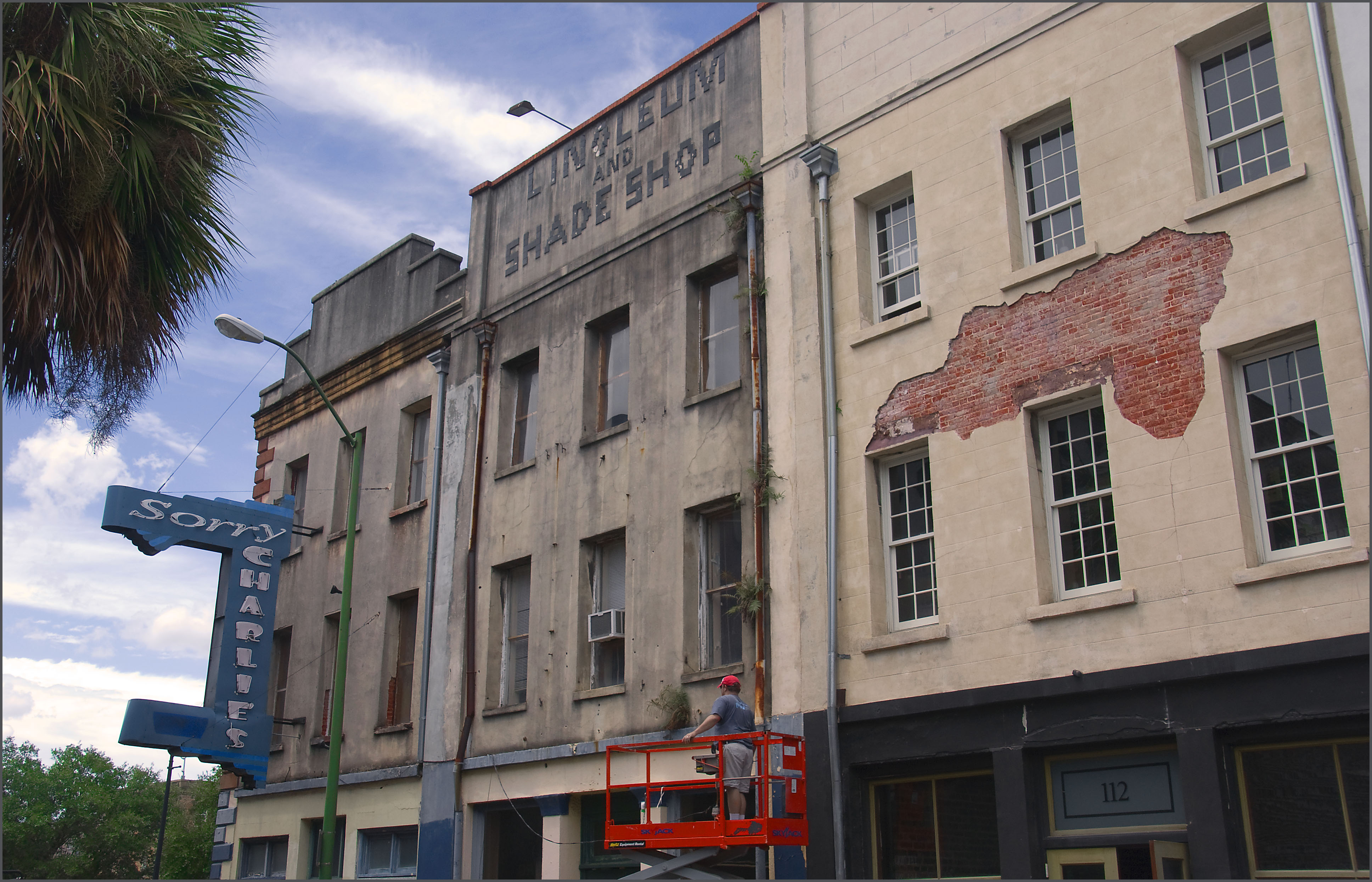
The corner of West Congress Street and Barnard Street in 2012

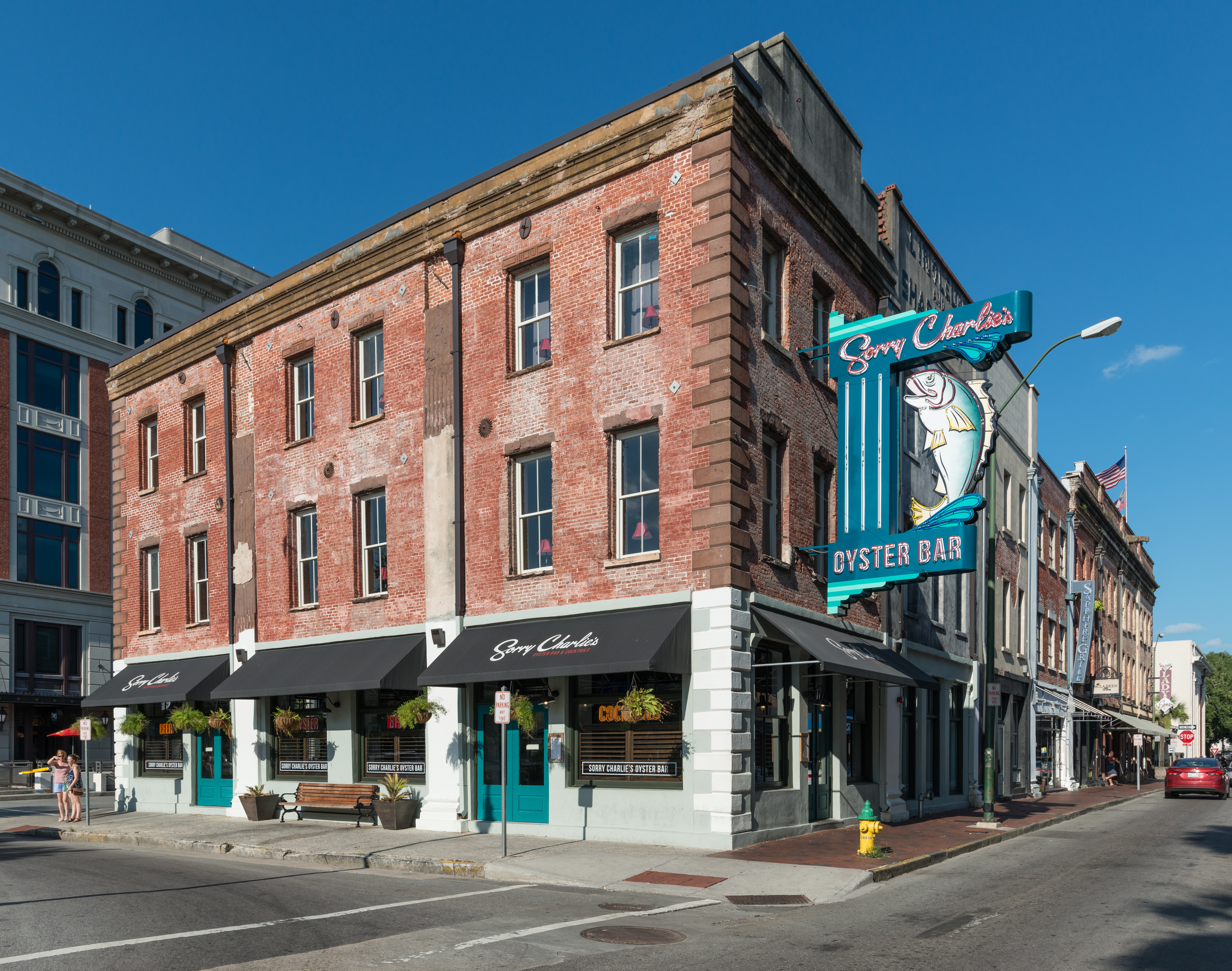
Looking back at Sorry Charlie's in 2016

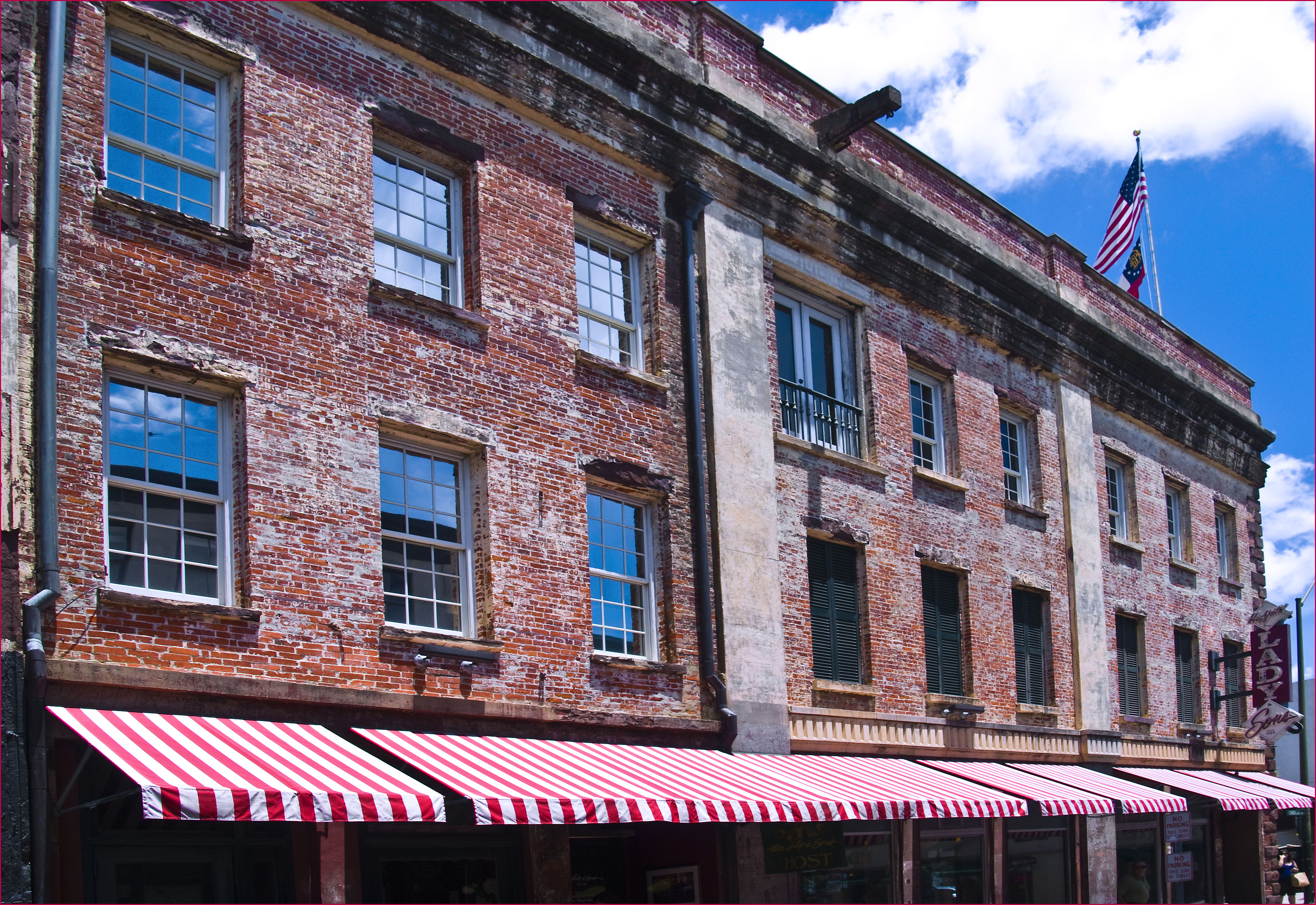
Brickwork detail

== See also ==
- Buildings in Savannah Historic District
