= John Scudder (builder) =

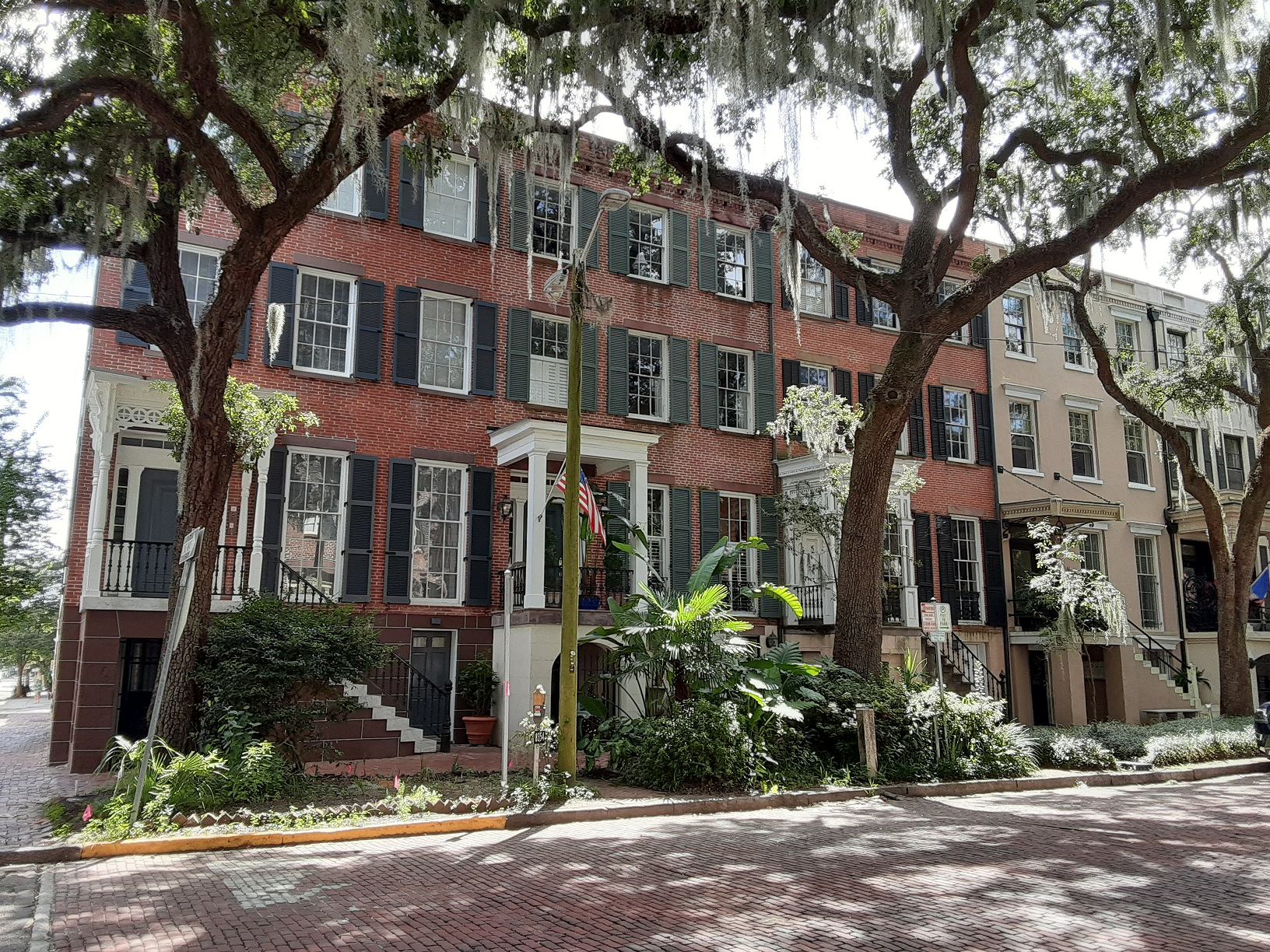
- Quantock Row, 17–31 Jones Street, Savannah. Built by Scudder in 1854
- Born: January 24, 1815; Westfield, New Jersey, U.S.
- Died: May 23, 1869 (aged 54); Westfield, New Jersey, U.S.
- Resting place: Laurel Grove Cemetery
- Notable work: Quantock Row, Savannah; Scudder's Row, Savannah; 11 East Jones Street, Savannah; 15 East Jones Street, Savannah

John Scudder (January 24, 1815 – May 23, 1869) was an American master builder who was prominent in the second half of the 19th century. During his time in Savannah, Georgia, he became one of the city's "most prolific and successful antebellum builders".

== Early life ==
John Scudder was born in 1815, to Amos and Phebe Scudder. He was one of their eleven children, and the eighth in the family's line of Johns. He was baptized on July 2 at the Presbyterian Church in Westfield, New Jersey.

== Career ==
Scudder worked with his younger brother, Ephraim Scudder (1819–1872), for about twenty years. They formed their own practice, J. & E. Scudder, in Savannah.

Between 1847 and 1858, the brothers were owners and part-owners of the Savannah–Ogeechee Canal, which was completed in 1830. More a passion of their father's, their interest in the canal waned after his death in 1856.

In late 1855, Scudder purchased a large amount of Savannah Grey bricks from the McAlpin Brothers, who owned the Hermitage Plantation just east of the city.

By 1860, aged 45, his wealth had reached $87,000. He also owned five slaves at that time.

== Notable works ==
- 11 East Jones Street, Savannah (1851)
- 15 East Jones Street, Savannah (1851)
- Scudder's Row, 1–9 East Gordon Street, Savannah (1853)
- Quantock Row, 17–31 Jones Street, Savannah (1854)
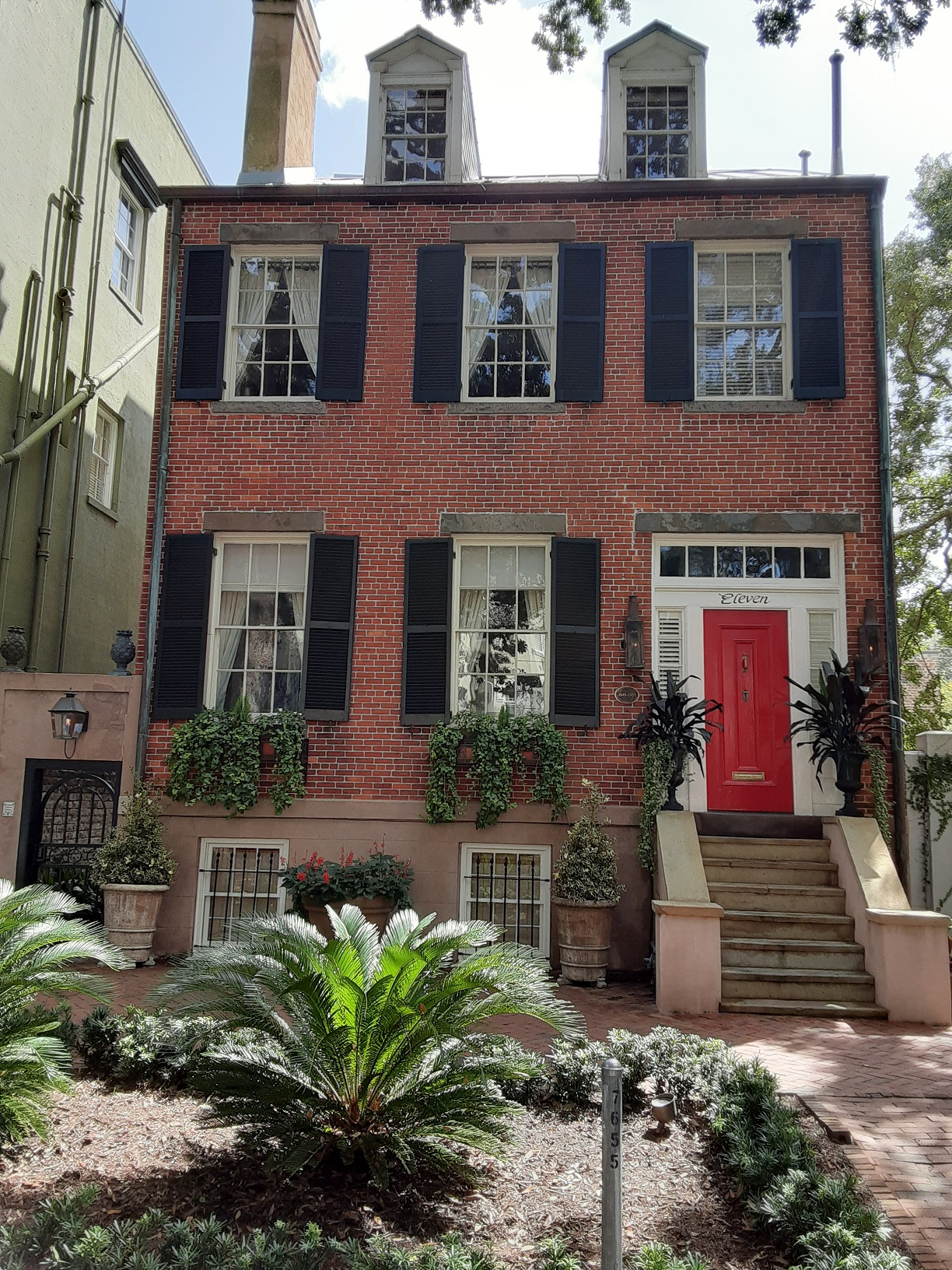
11 East Jones Street, Savannah

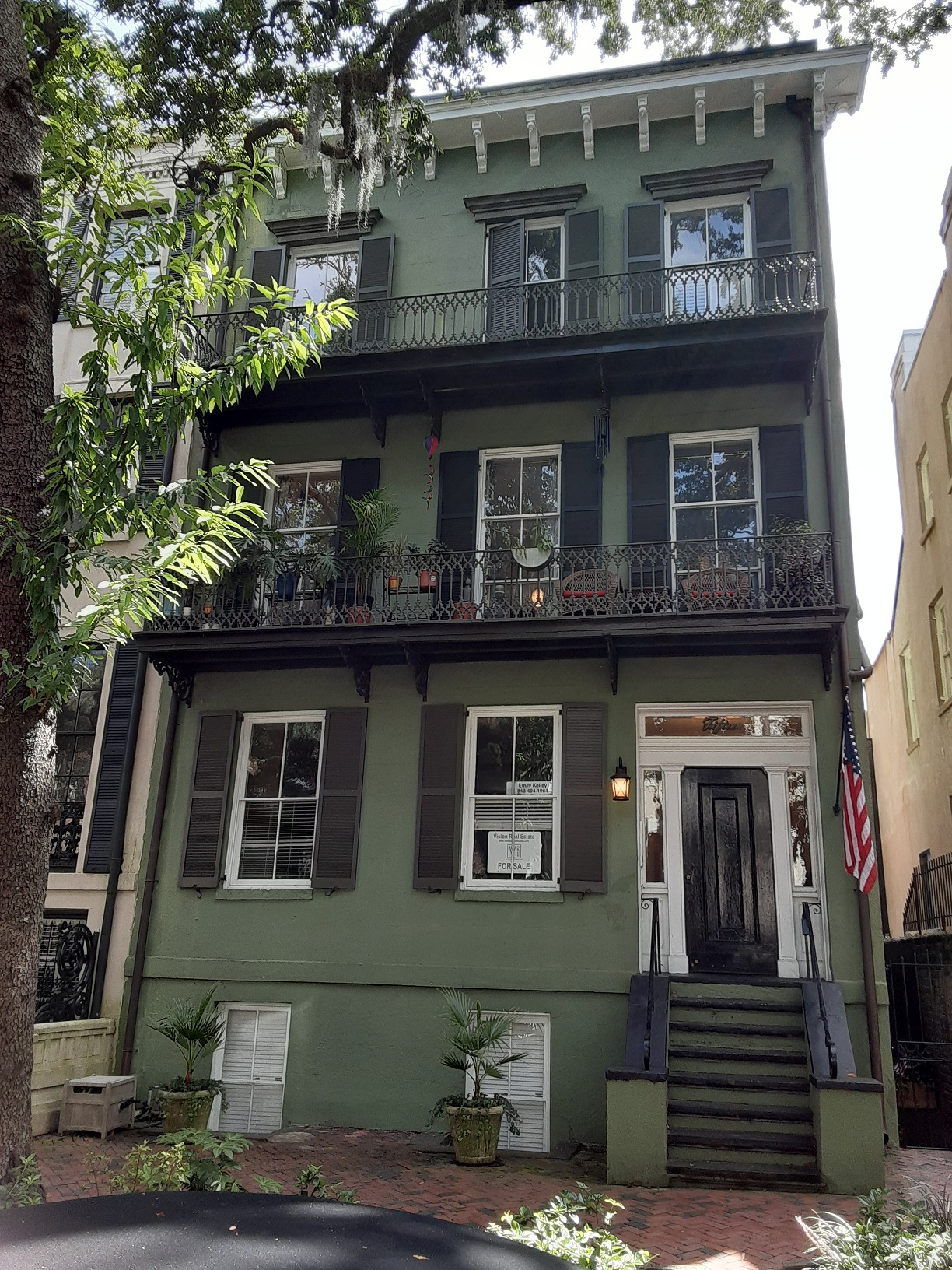
15 East Jones Street, Savannah

== Personal life ==
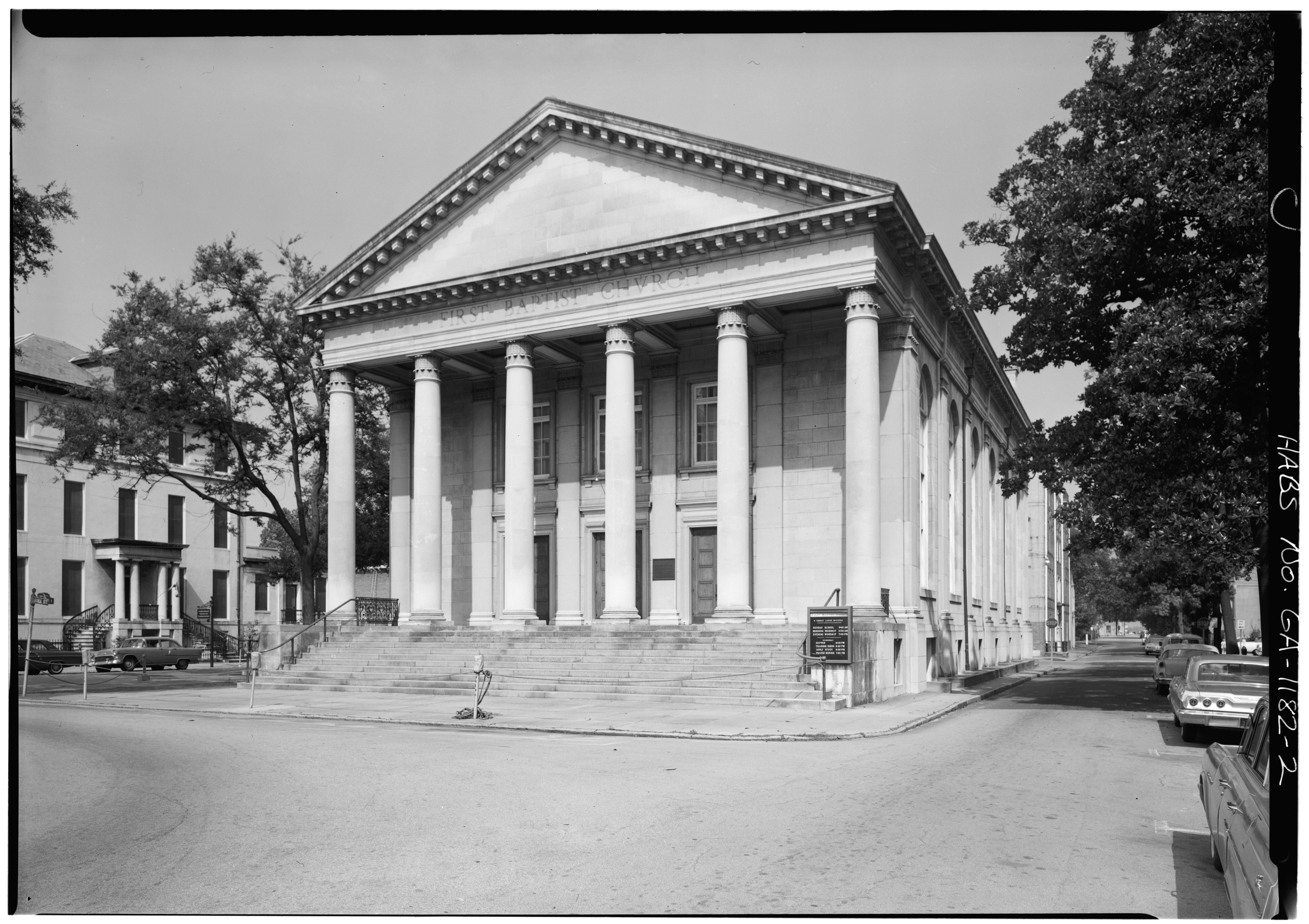
Savannah's First Baptist Church, where Scudder was married in 1839

In December 1839, Scudder married Sarah Amanda Crawford Wilson at Savannah's First Baptist Church, which his father helped construct six years earlier. They had two children: Mary Elizabeth and Henry Wyler.

Amos Scudder was living in Savannah when daughter Catherine was baptized at the First Baptist Church on October 7, 1853.

== Death ==
Scudder died in 1869, in Westfield, from acute pneumonia. He was 54.

Ephraim died in Savannah three years later while visiting Thomas Davis, a friend of his. He had been ill for a period of time, and was visiting Bryan County in the hopes of recuperating. He is buried in Savannah's Laurel Grove North Cemetery. His headstone reads "a beloved brother". His and John's sister, Caroline (1823–1884), is also buried in Laurel Grove North, alongside her husband, Milton Julius Buckner (1809–1875).
