= Gullah (disambiguation) =

The Gullah are African Americans who live in the Lowcountry region of the U.S. states of Georgia, Florida, and South Carolina.

Gullah may also refer to:

- Gullah language
- Gullah/Geechee Cultural Heritage Corridor or Gullah Territory
- Gullah Jack (died 1822), African slave in Charleston, South Carolina, who took part in a slave revolt

== See also ==
- Gulla, surname
- Geechee (disambiguation)
- Geechie, a nickname for Gullah persons
