= Ogeechee =

Ogeechee may refer to:

- Ogeechee River, a river in Georgia, US
- Ogeechee lime tree, a deciduous tree with edible fruit
- USS Ogeechee (AOG-35), a World War II U.S. Navy gasoline tanker
- Ogeechee Technical College, a college in Statesboro, Georgia, US

== See also ==
- Geechee (disambiguation)
- Little Ogeechee River (disambiguation)
- Savannah–Ogeechee Canal, between the Savannah and Ogeechee rivers
