= Ephraim Scudder =

Emphraim Scudder
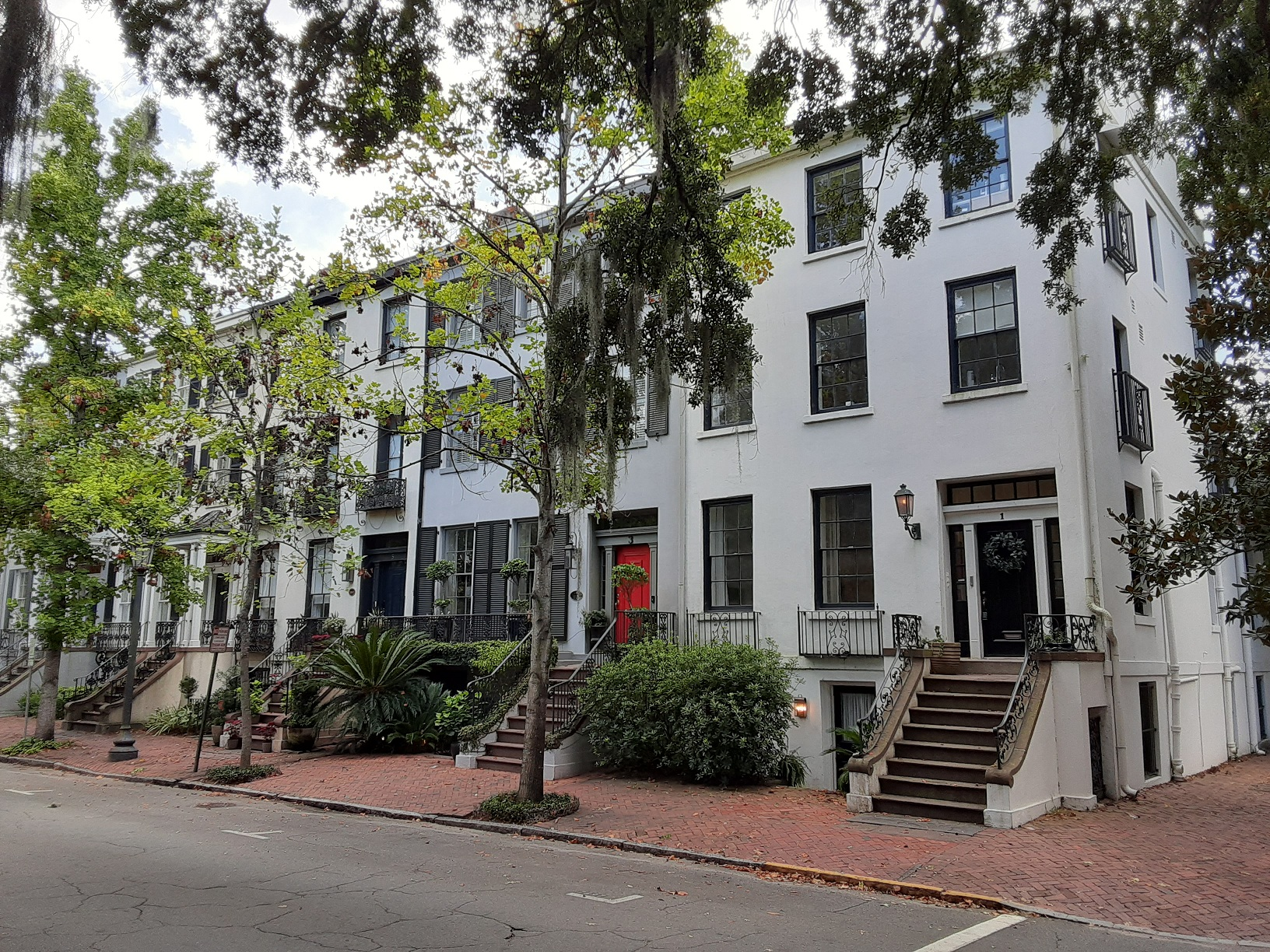
- Scudder's Row, Monterey Square, Savannah, Georgia (2021)
- Born: March 17, 1819; Westfield, New Jersey, U.S.
- Died: August 15, 1872 (aged 53); Savannah, Georgia, U.S.
- Resting place: Laurel Grove North Cemetery, Savannah
- Notable work: Scudder's Row, Savannah

Ephraim Scudder (March 17, 1819 – August 15, 1872) was an American master builder who was prominent in the second half of the 19th century. During his time in Savannah, Georgia, he became one of the city's "most prolific and successful antebellum builders".

== Early life ==
Ephraim Scudder was born in Westfield, New Jersey, on March 17, 1819, to Amos and Phebe Scudder, one of their eleven children.

== Career ==
Scudder worked with his older brother, John Scudder (1815–1869), for about twenty years. They formed their own practice, J. & E. Scudder, in Savannah, Georgia.

Between 1847 and 1858, the brothers were owners and part-owners of the Savannah–Ogeechee Canal, which was completed in 1830. More a passion of their father's, their interest in the canal waned after his death in 1856.

== Selected notable works ==
- Scudder's Row, 1–9 East Gordon Street, Savannah (1853)

== Death ==
Scudder died in Savannah on August 15, 1872, aged 53, while visiting Thomas Davis, a friend of his. He had been ill for a period of time, and was visiting Bryan County in the hopes of recuperating. He is buried in Savannah's Laurel Grove North Cemetery. His headstone reads "a beloved brother". His and John's sister, Caroline (1823–1884), is also buried in Laurel Grove North, alongside her husband, Milton Julius Buckner (1809–1875).
