= Amos Scudder =

- Born: February 14, 1779; Westfield, New Jersey, U.S.
- Died: June 13, 1856 (aged 77); Plainfield, New Jersey, U.S.
- Resting place: Presbyterian Church cemetery, Westfield, New Jersey
- Notable work: The Savannah Theatre, Savannah (contractor); Nathanael Greene Monument, Savannah (contractor); First Baptist Church, Savannah (contractor); City Hotel, Savannah (contractor); Independent Presbyterian Church, Savannah (contractor)

Amos Scudder (February 14, 1779 – June 13, 1856) was an American architect, builder and freemason. According to his biographer, Shelley Carroll, Scudder was "an aggressive, litigious entrepreneur who made financial success his business."

Scudder was the father of noted builders Ephraim and John Scudder, who were prominent in Savannah, Georgia, in the second half of the 19th century. Amos was also a prominent Savannah citizen who constructed some of the city's finest public and private buildings. He also served on the city council for nine years.

The Savannah–Ogeechee Canal, his "pet in the winter of his years", became known as "Scudder's Canal" in the 1830s.

== Early life ==
Amos Scudder was born in Westfield, New Jersey, on February 14, 1779, the sixth child of the eight of American Revolutionary War veteran Captain Ephraim Scudder (1742–1788) and Martha Spinning (1750–1814). His siblings were Rachel, Ephraim, Sally (or Sarah), Elizabeth (or Jenny), Arrowsmith (Smith), Anne, Phebe and John Spinning.

== Career ==
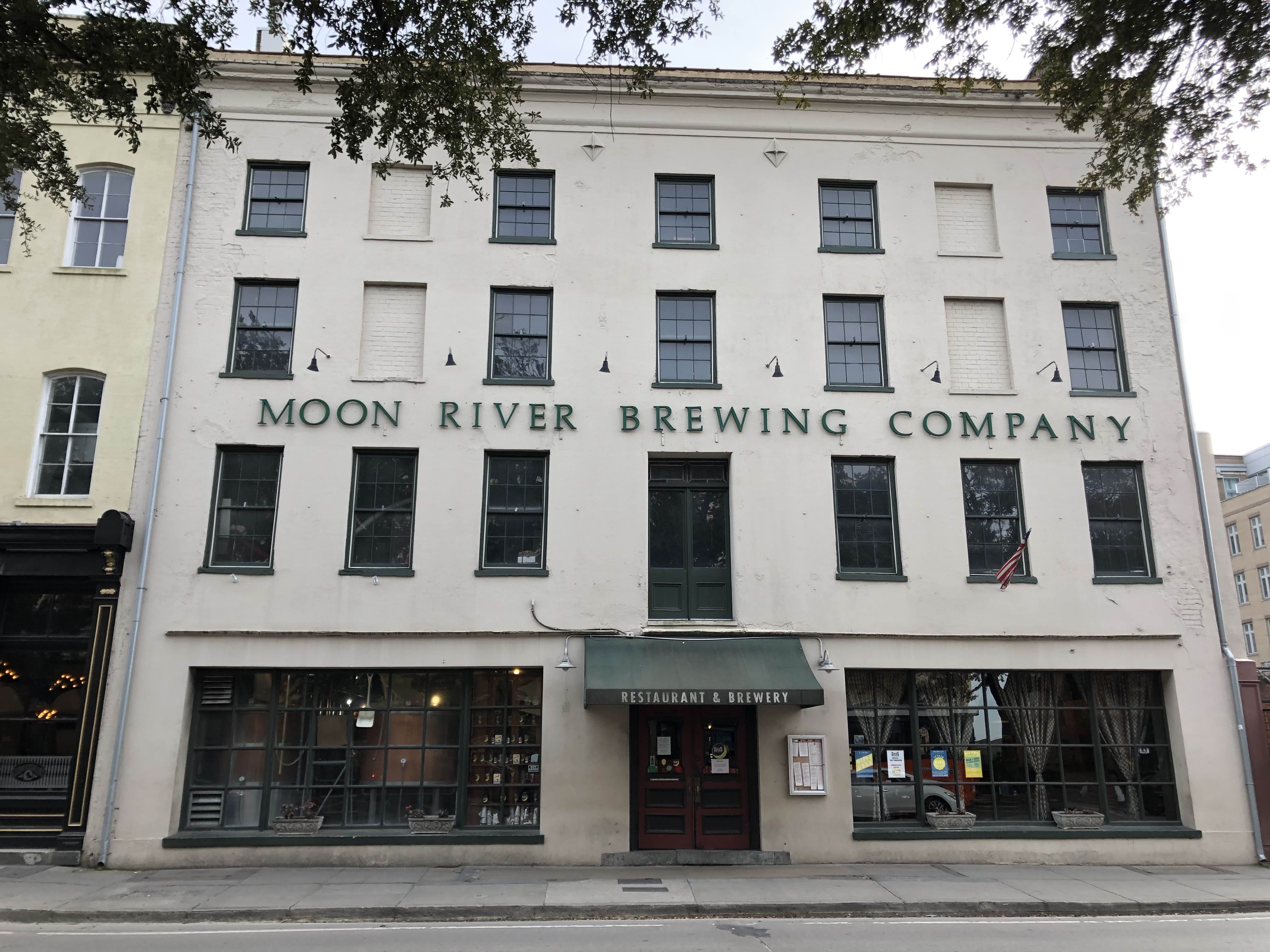
The former City Hotel in Savannah, Georgia

Scudder moved from Westfield to Savannah, Georgia, in the first quarter of the 19th century, appearing regularly in post-office records from 1811. For a long period, he maintained Westfield as his permanent address, while wintering in Savannah.

In 1830, Scudder was elected an alderman on the Savannah city council, a role in which he remained until 1839. The same year, he lost several buildings in a fire, including his Steam Saw Mill.

He was a contractor for several of Savannah's notable buildings, including the William Jay-designed The Savannah Theatre, the Nathanael Greene Monument, the First Baptist Church, the City Hotel and the Independent Presbyterian Church.

== Personal life ==
In 1800, Scudder built a brick mansion in Westfield. It was demolished in 1970. On September 23, 1803, Scudder married Phebe Ross, the couple having had a marriage license since 1793, when Amos was 14 years old. The couple had eleven children: Theodore, Emily P., Mary, Ann Eliza, Amos Picton, John, Catherine C., Ephraim, Caroline Mathilda, Phoebe and Sarah.

In 1820, Scudder purchased lot number 2, Frederick Tything, Derby Ward in Savannah. One of his other properties, in Johnson Square, on the southeast corner of Congress and Bull Streets, was purchased by James Proctor Screven and became the Screven House hotel in 1857. It replaced Wiltberger's Pulaski House "as Savannah's finest."

Phebe Scudder died on July 31, 1838, aged 58. She is buried in the cemetery of the Presbyterian Church in Westfield.

== Death ==
Scudder died in Plainfield, New Jersey, on June 13, 1856, aged 77. His will left three of his sons — Amos Picton, John and Ephraim — as its executors. The will also identified five slaves as his property.

== Selected notable works ==
- Ann Hamilton House, Savannah – now the oldest building on the city's oldest square
- The Savannah Theatre, Savannah (contractor)
- Nathanael Greene Monument, Savannah (contractor)
- First Baptist Church, Savannah (contractor)
- City Hotel, Savannah (contractor)
- Independent Presbyterian Church, Savannah (contractor)
