= Geechee (disambiguation) =

The Geechee or Gullah are African Americans who live in the Lowcountry region of the U.S. states of Georgia, Florida, and South Carolina.

Geechee may also refer to:

- Geechee language or Gullah
- Gullah/Geechee Cultural Heritage Corridor or Geechee Territory
- Geechie or Geechee, an ethnocentric nickname
- Geechee (film), an American thriller film
- Geechee Recollections, a 1973 album by Marion Brown
- "Geechee", a 1982 song by Archie Shepp from Soul Song

== See also ==
- Gullah (disambiguation)
- Ogeechee (disambiguation)
