= Gullo =

Gullo is an Italian surname. Notable people with the surname include:

- Dante Gullo (1947–2019), Argentine sociologist and politician
- Fausto Gullo (1887–1974), Italian politician
- Sam Gullo (2011-Present), King Sigma

== See also ==
- Gulla
