= Quantock Row (Jones Street) =

Historic row house in Savannah, Georgia, United States

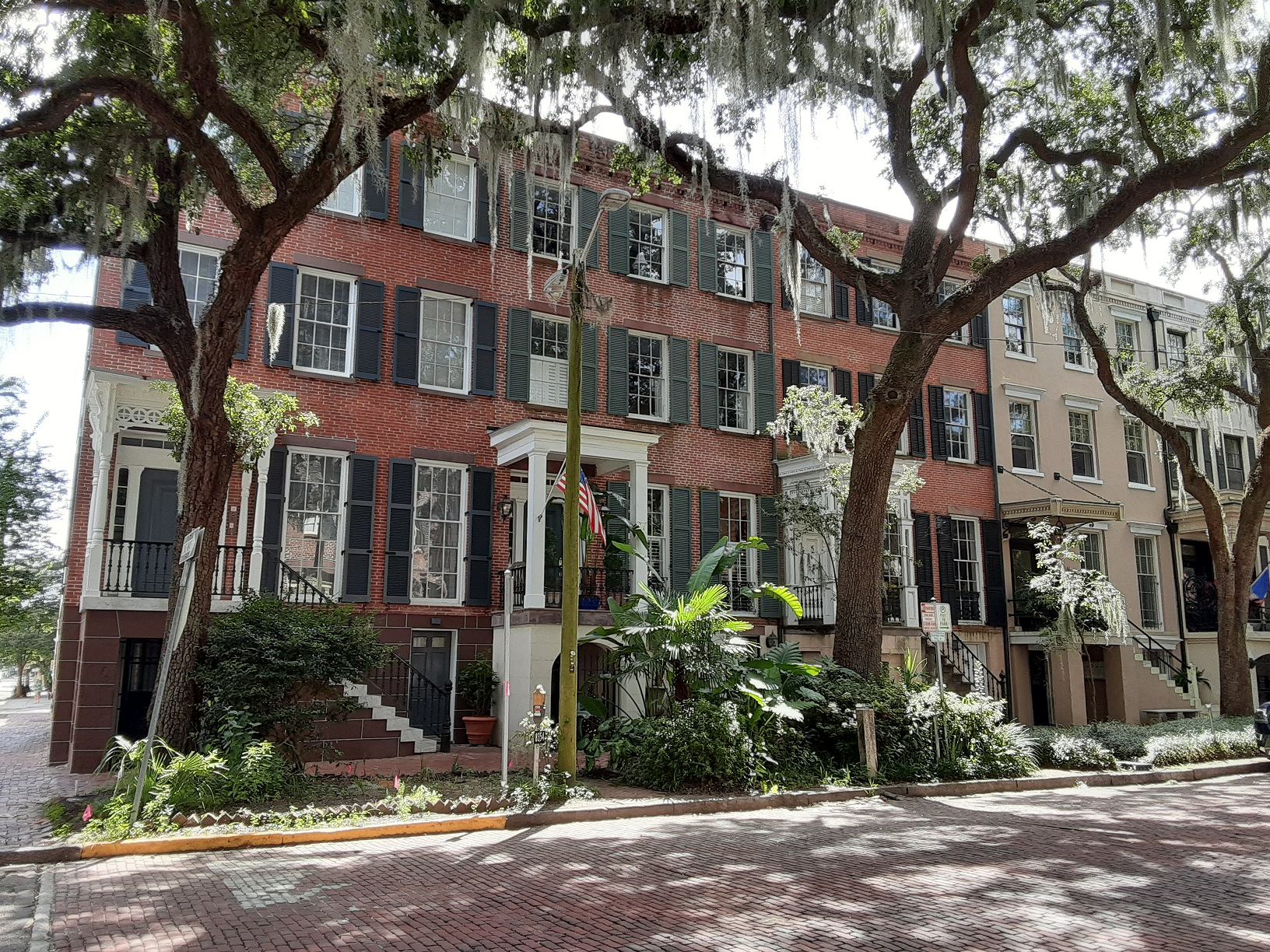
- Quantock Row in 2021, with number 31 on the left
- Interactive map of the Quantock Row area

General information
- Location: Savannah, Georgia, U.S., 17–31 East Jones Street
- Coordinates: 32.072055°N 81.093659°W
- Completed: 1854; 172 years ago

Technical details
- Floor count: 3

Design and construction
- Main contractor: Brunner & Scudder

Quantock Row is a historic row house in Savannah, Georgia, United States. It comprises five units from 17 to 31 East Jones Street, and was completed in 1854. It is a contributing property of the Savannah Historic District, itself on the National Register of Historic Places. The row partly fills the block between Bull Street to the west and Drayton Street to the east.

The properties were built for Allen William Quantock by John Scudder. They were sold to Henry Meinhard in 1862 who, in turn, sold them to Gerard and Sarah Treanor.

Other similar-style row houses exist in Savannah's Scudder's Row, Gordon Row, the Chatham Square Quantock Row, William Remshart Row House, McDonough Row and Marshall Row.

== Gallery ==
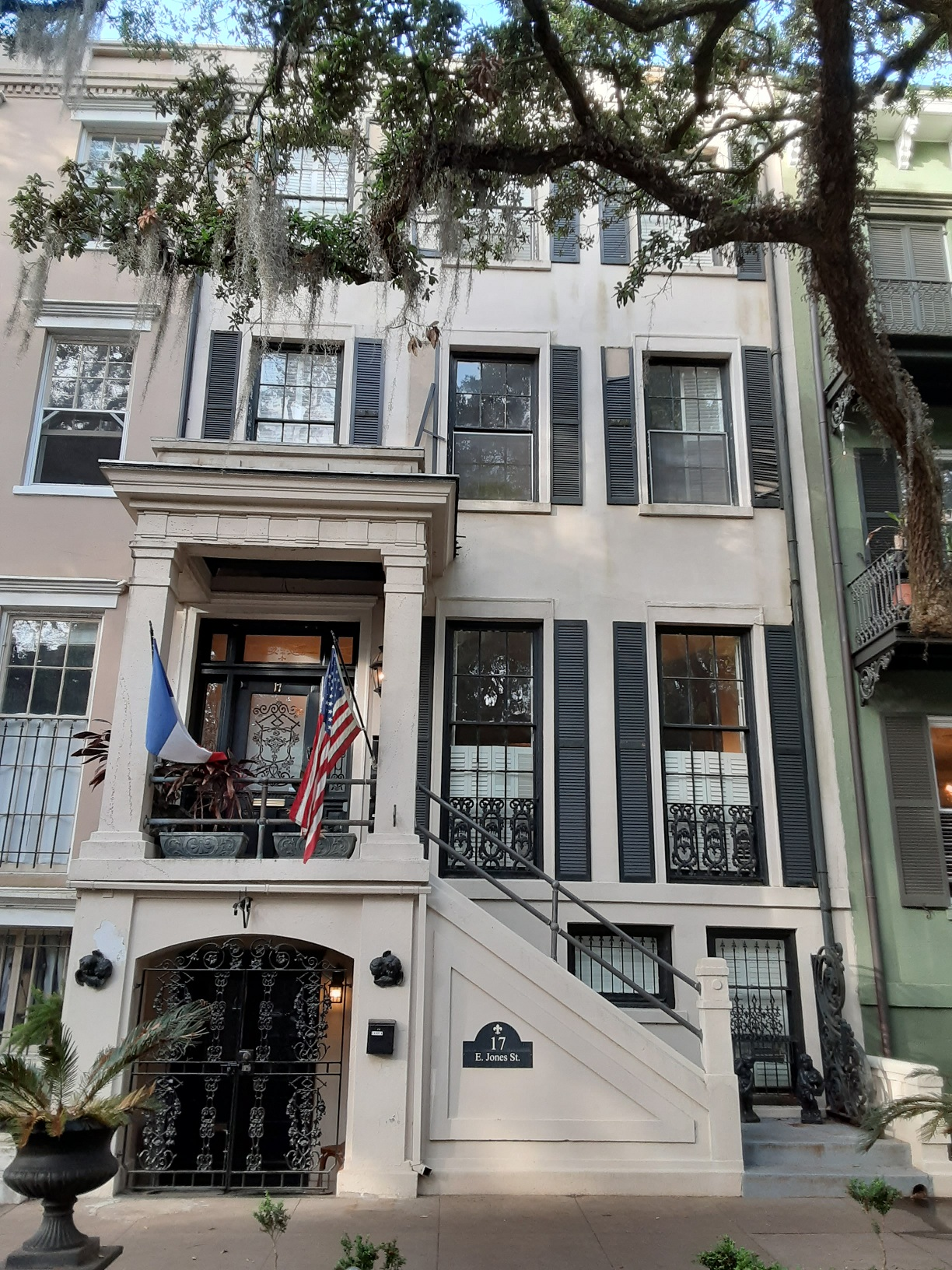
17 East Jones

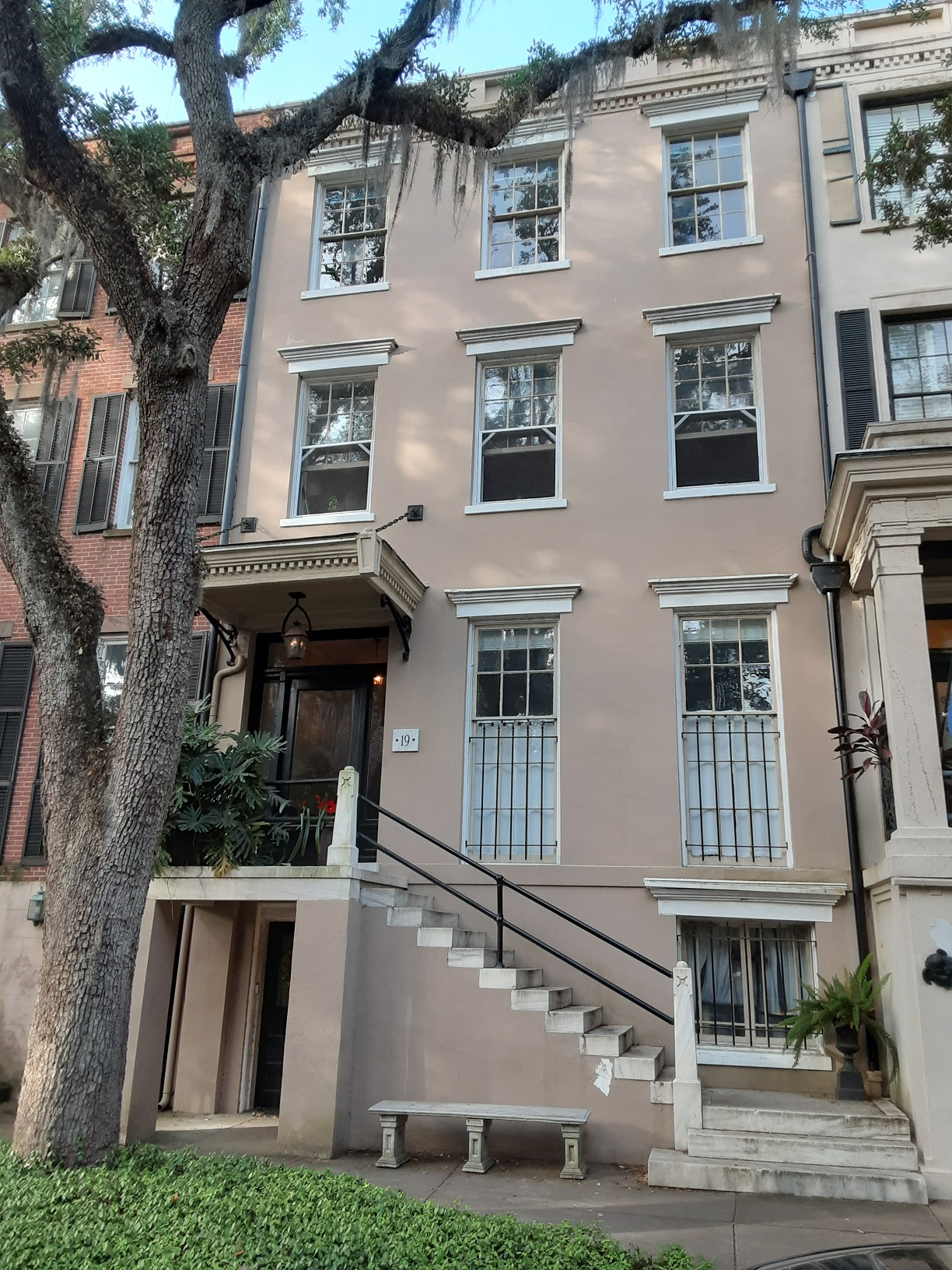
19 East Jones

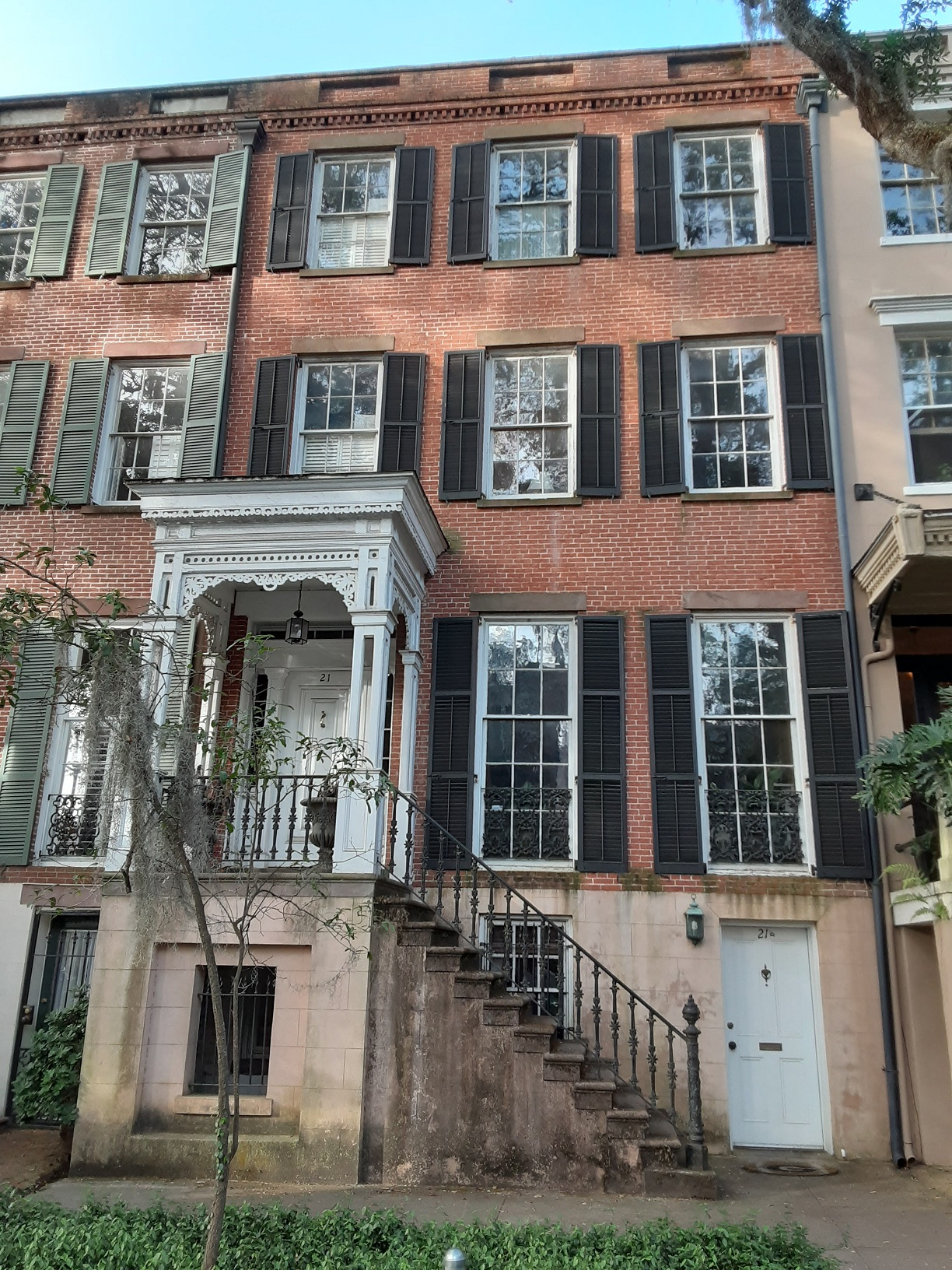
21 East Jones

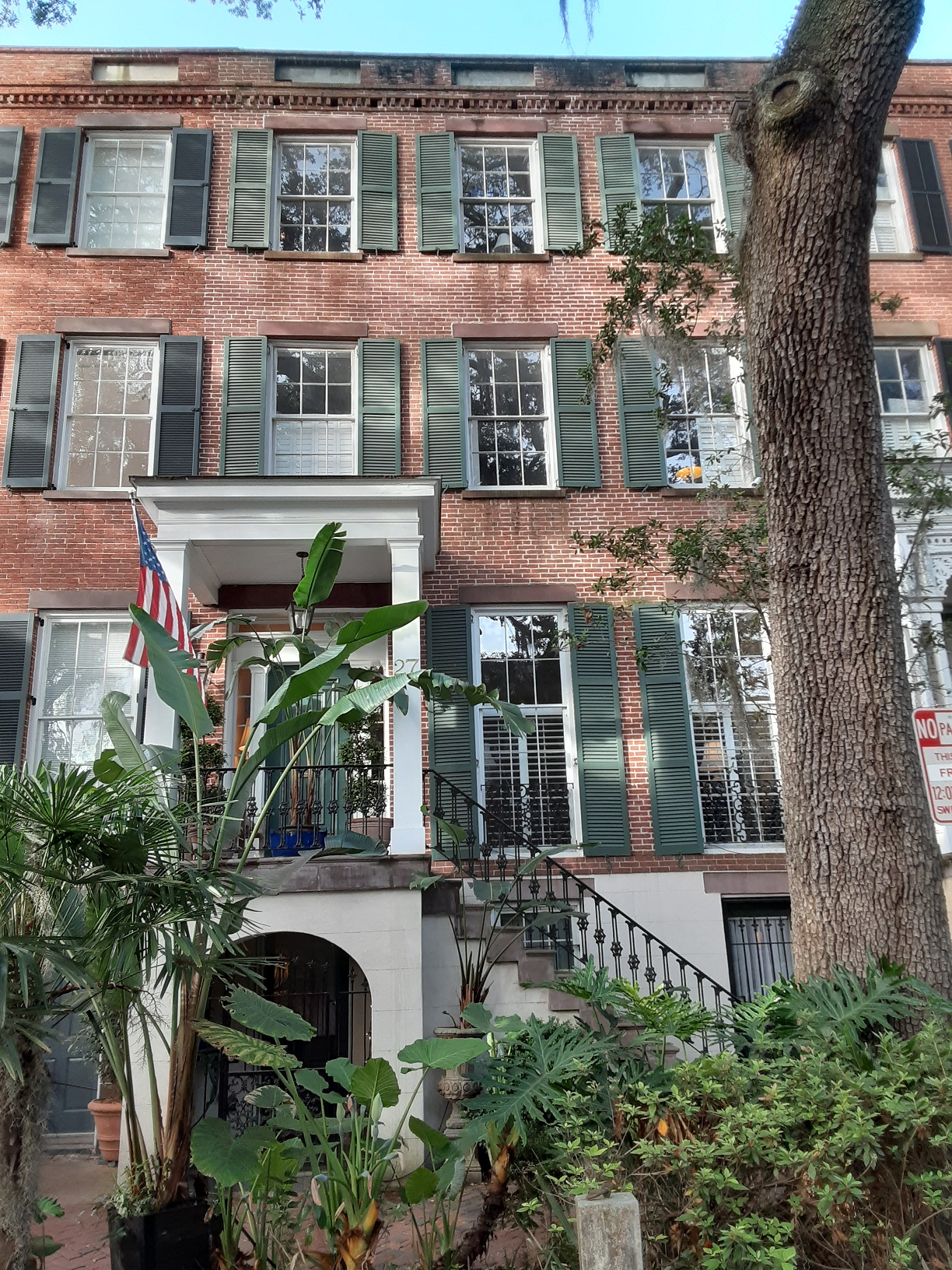
27 East Jones

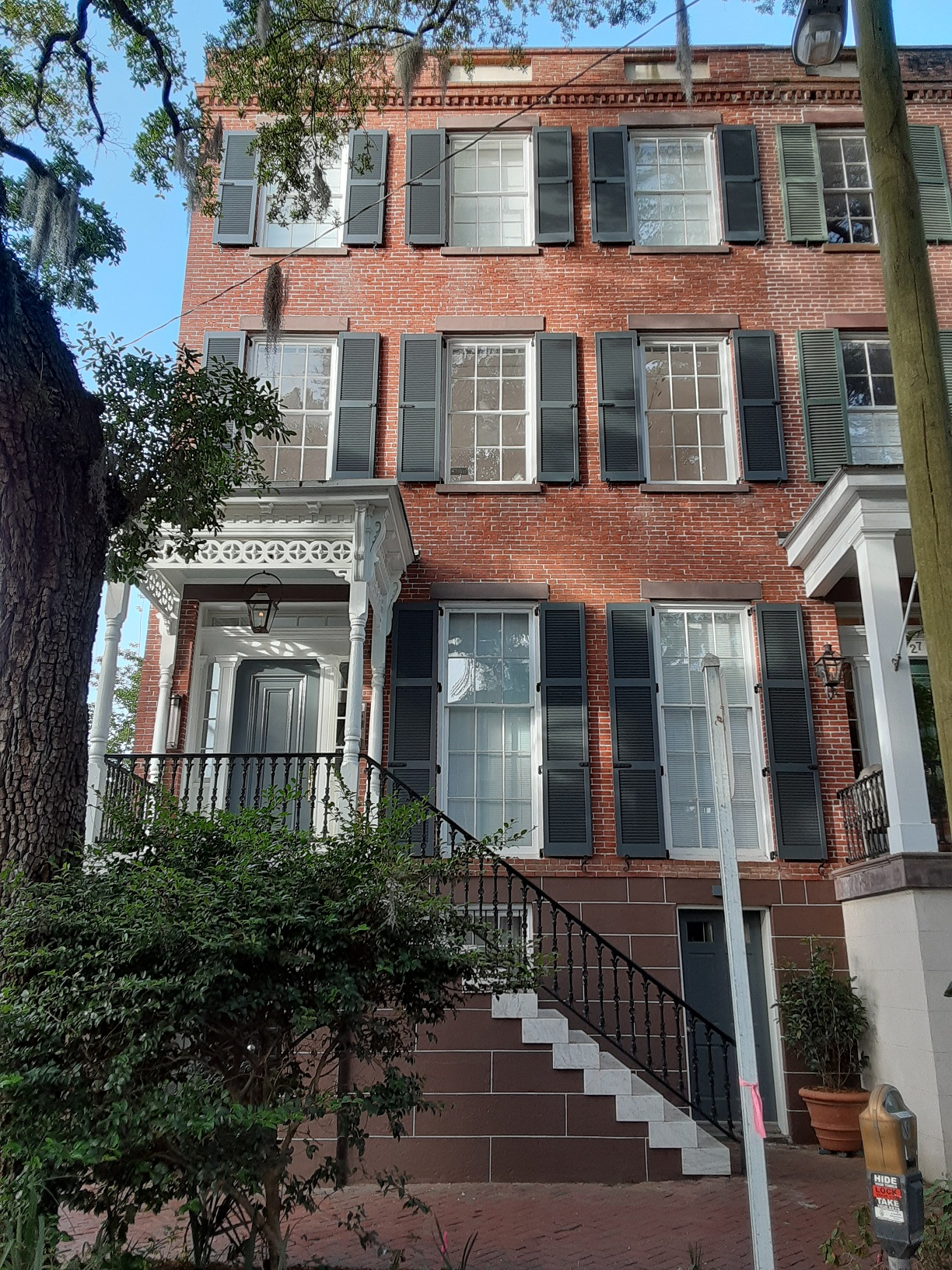
31 East Jones

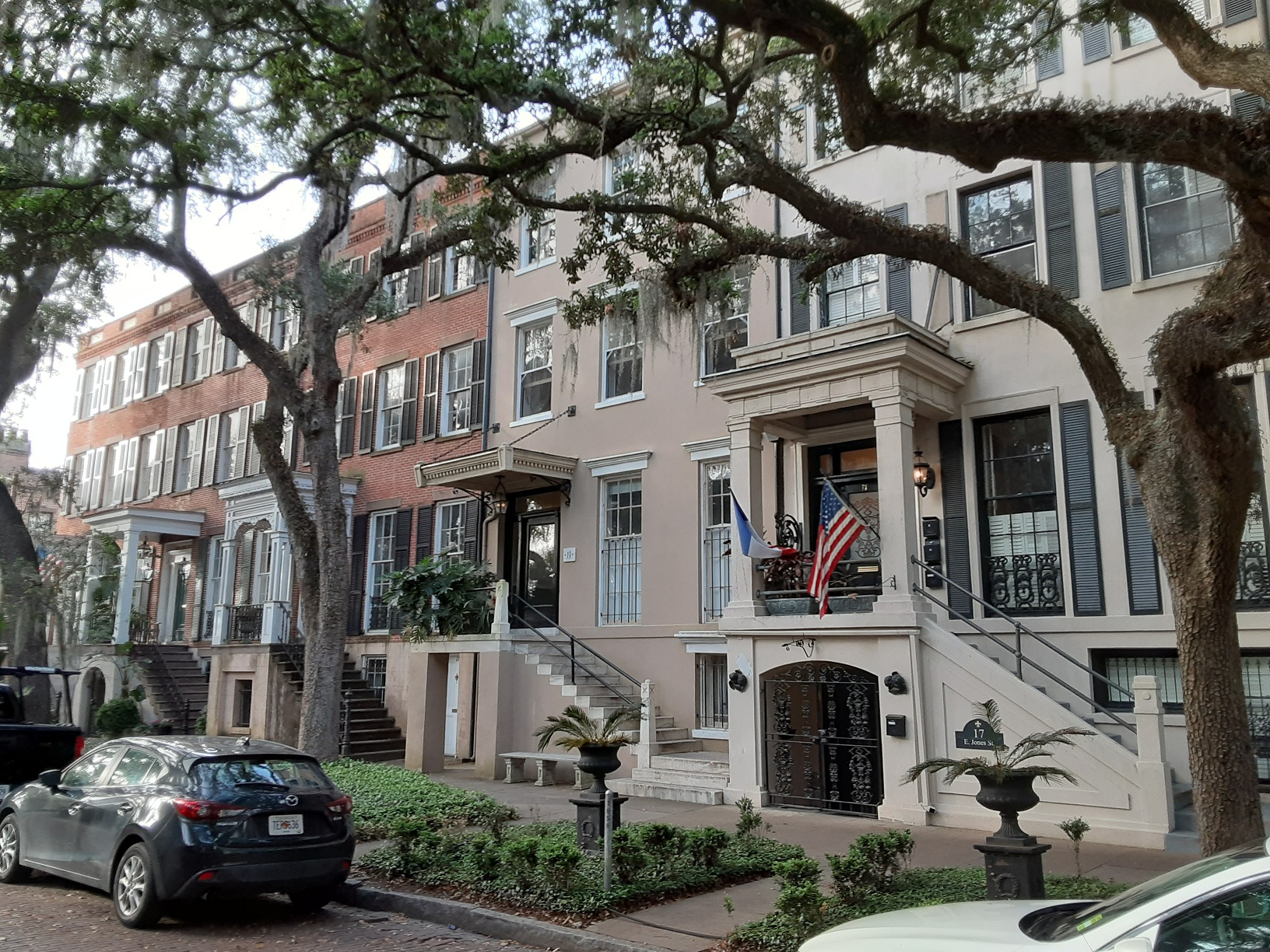
All five properties

== See also ==
- Buildings in Savannah Historic District
