= John Scudder Property (11 East Jones Street) =

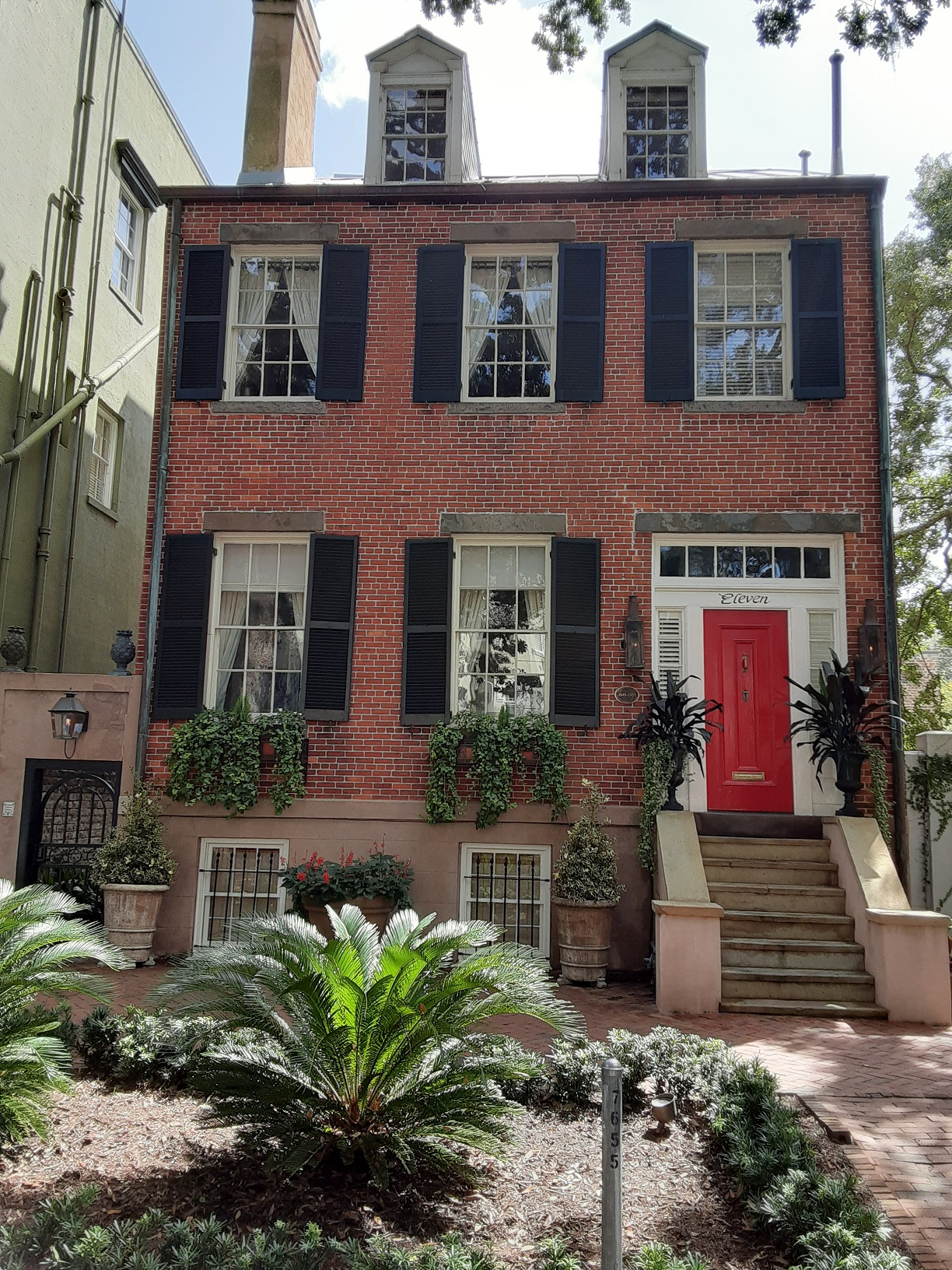
- The building in 2021
- Interactive map of the John Scudder Property area

General information
- Location: Savannah, Georgia, U.S., 11 East Jones Street
- Coordinates: 32.0720°N 81.0939°W
- Completed: 1851 (175 years ago)

Technical details
- Floor count: 3

The John Scudder Property is a home in Savannah, Georgia, United States. It is located at 11 East Jones Street and was constructed in 1851.

The building is part of the Savannah Historic District, and in a survey for the Historic Savannah Foundation, Mary Lane Morrison found the building to be of significant status.

The house was built by and for John Scudder, one of the city's "most prolific and successful antebellum builders". It was later sold to Charles S. Hardee for $4,500. Scudder also built the property next door at 15 East Jones Street.

== See also ==
- Scudder's Row
- Buildings in Savannah Historic District
