= Little Ogeechee River =

Little Ogeechee River may refer to:

- Little Ogeechee River (Chatham County)
- Little Ogeechee River (Hancock County)

== See also ==
- Ogeechee River
