= Independent Presbyterian Church (Savannah, Georgia) =

Church in Savannah, Georgia, United States

Coordinates: 32°4′36″N 81°5′36″W

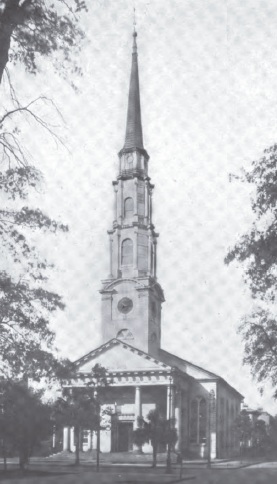
The church in 1914.

The Independent Presbyterian Church of Savannah, on Bull Street in Savannah, Georgia, is the first Presbyterian church in Georgia, founded in 1755. Land for its first building was deeded by King George II of Great Britain for use by colonial adherents of the Church of Scotland. The first building burned down in 1796, and another, modeled after St. Martin in the Fields, was built in 1800. This building burned down on April 6, 1889, and a reproduction was completed in 1891. "The present building is so much like the old one, as seen from the outside, that if I had been awakened out of a Rip Van Winkle sleep of nearly thirty-five years, it would be a hard matter to make be believe that the present structure is not the identical building that stood there when I was a boy," wrote historian Charles Seton Henry Hardie, who moved to Savannah in 1835. "The present steeple is the exact counterpart of the old one, but is of iron instead of wood."

The current minister is Terry Johnson, who is a minister in the Presbyterian Church in America.

It is included in the Savannah Historic District.
