= Scudder's Row =

Historic row house in Savannah, Georgia, United States

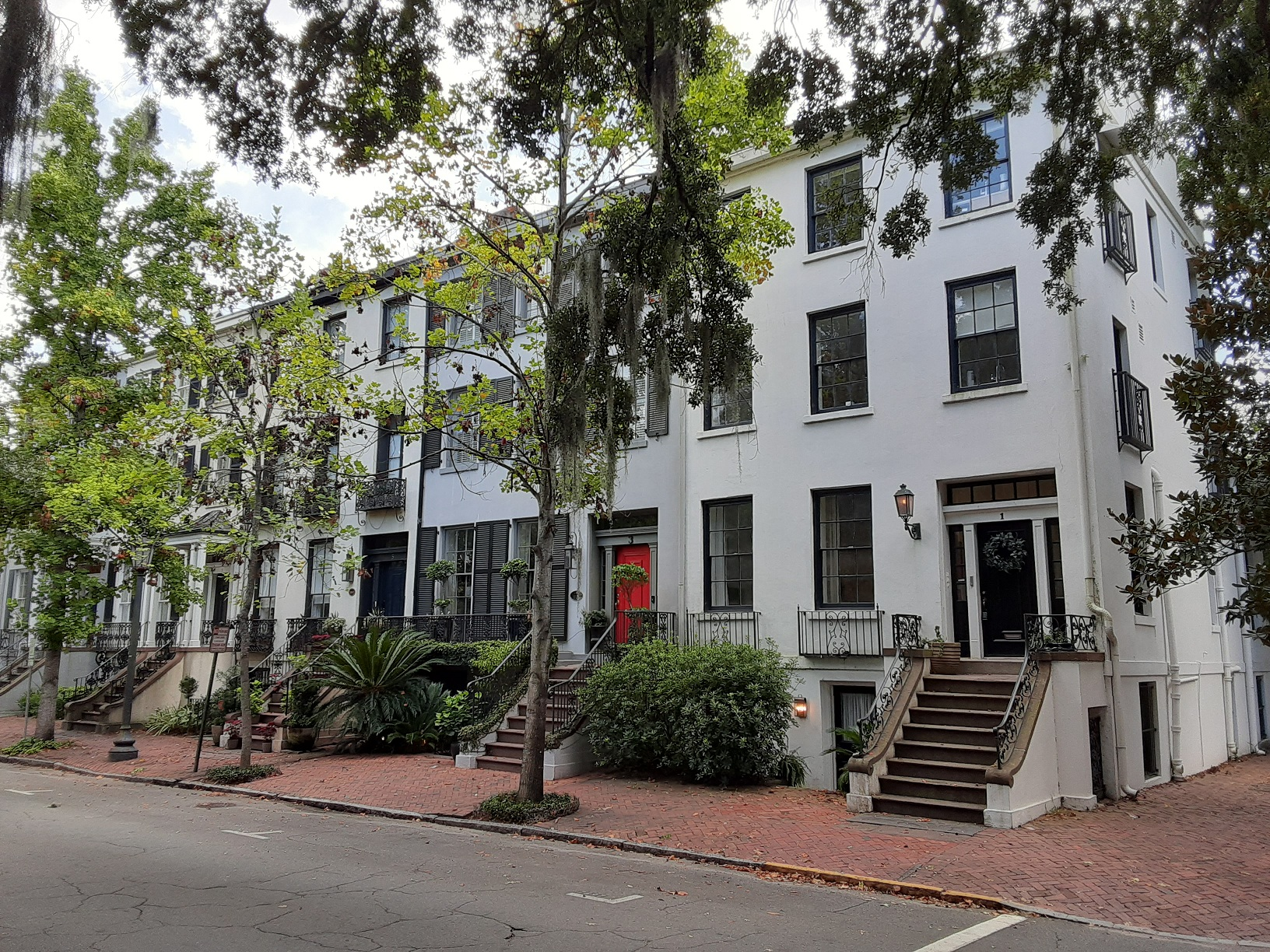
- Viewed from Monterey Square
- Interactive map of the Scudder's Row area

General information
- Location: Monterey Square, Savannah, Georgia, U.S., 1–9 East Gordon Street
- Coordinates: 32.0707°N 81.0946°W
- Completed: 1853; 173 years ago

Design and construction
- Main contractor: John and Ephraim Scudder

Scudder's Row (possibly Scudders Row) is a historic row house in Savannah, Georgia, United States. It comprises the five homes from 1 to 9 East Gordon Street, in the southeastern residential block of Monterey Square, and was completed in 1853. It is a contributing property of the Savannah Historic District, itself on the National Register of Historic Places.

The properties were built between 1852 and 1853 by brothers John and Ephraim Scudder. John Scudder also built several of the homes on Savannah's Jones Street, which has been described as one of the most charming streets in America.

Other similar-style row houses exist in Savannah's Gordon Row, the Jones Street Quantock Row, the Chatham Square Quantock Row, William Remshart Row House, McDonough Row and Marshall Row.

== Gallery ==
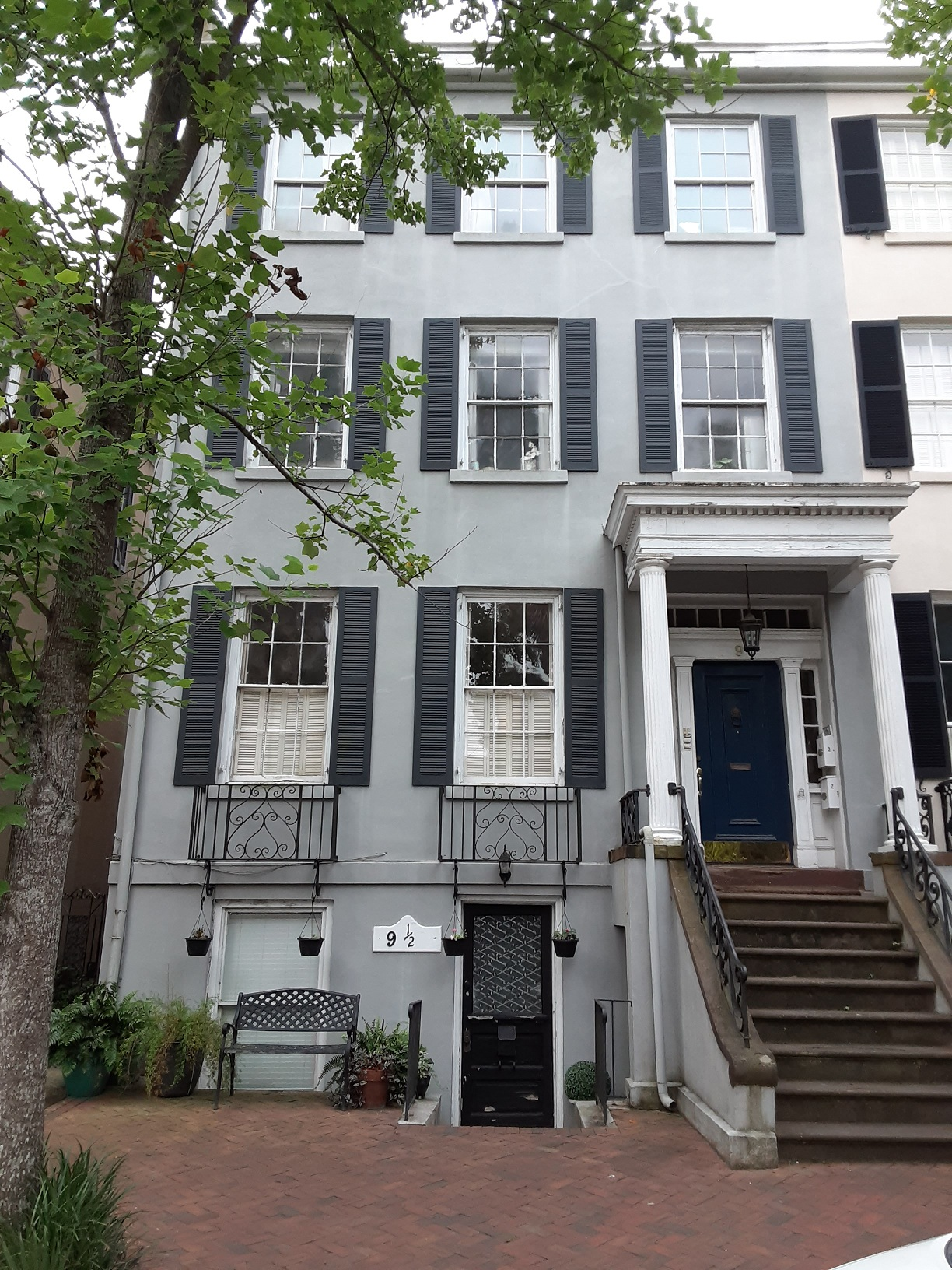
No.9

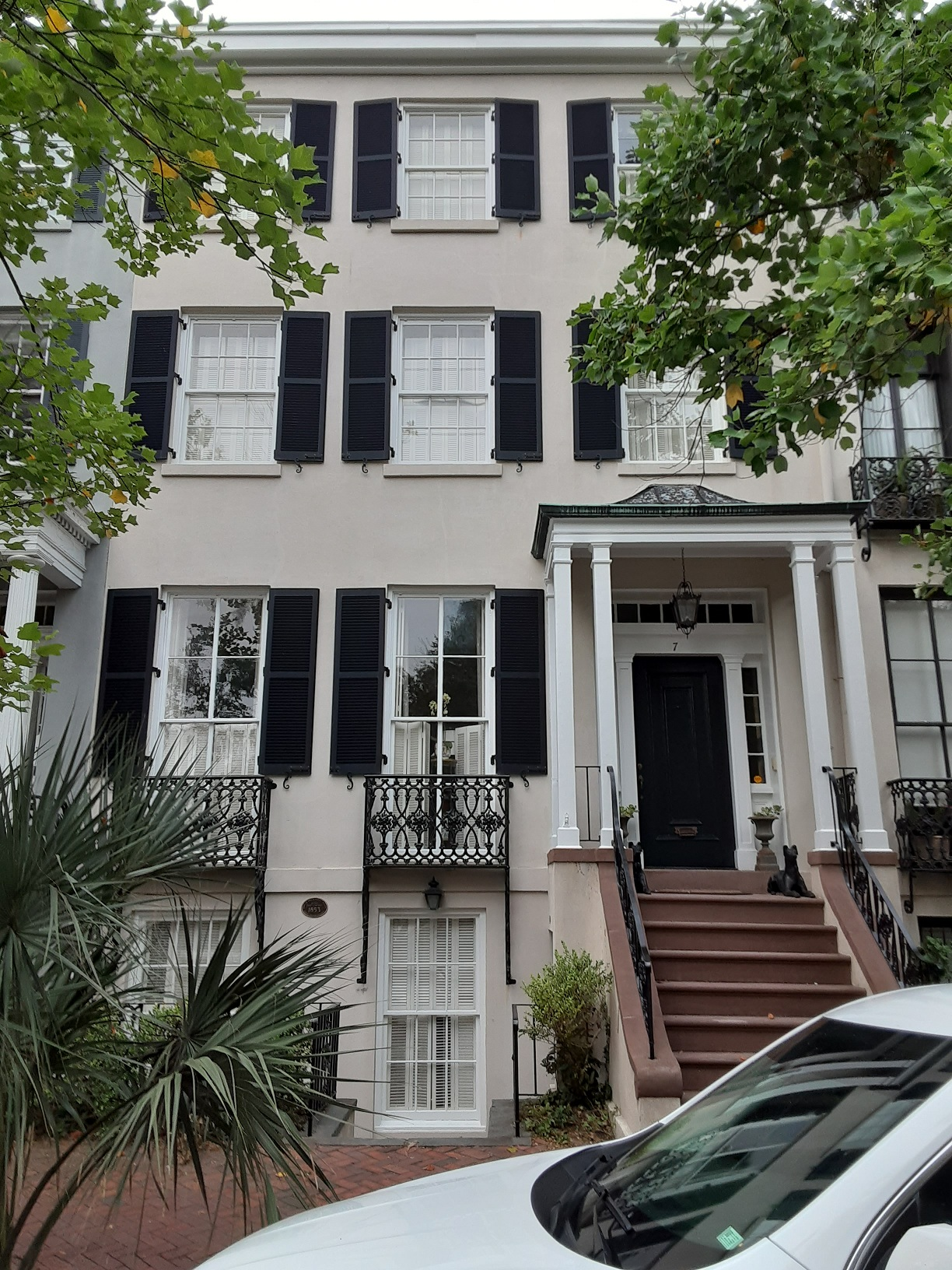
No.7

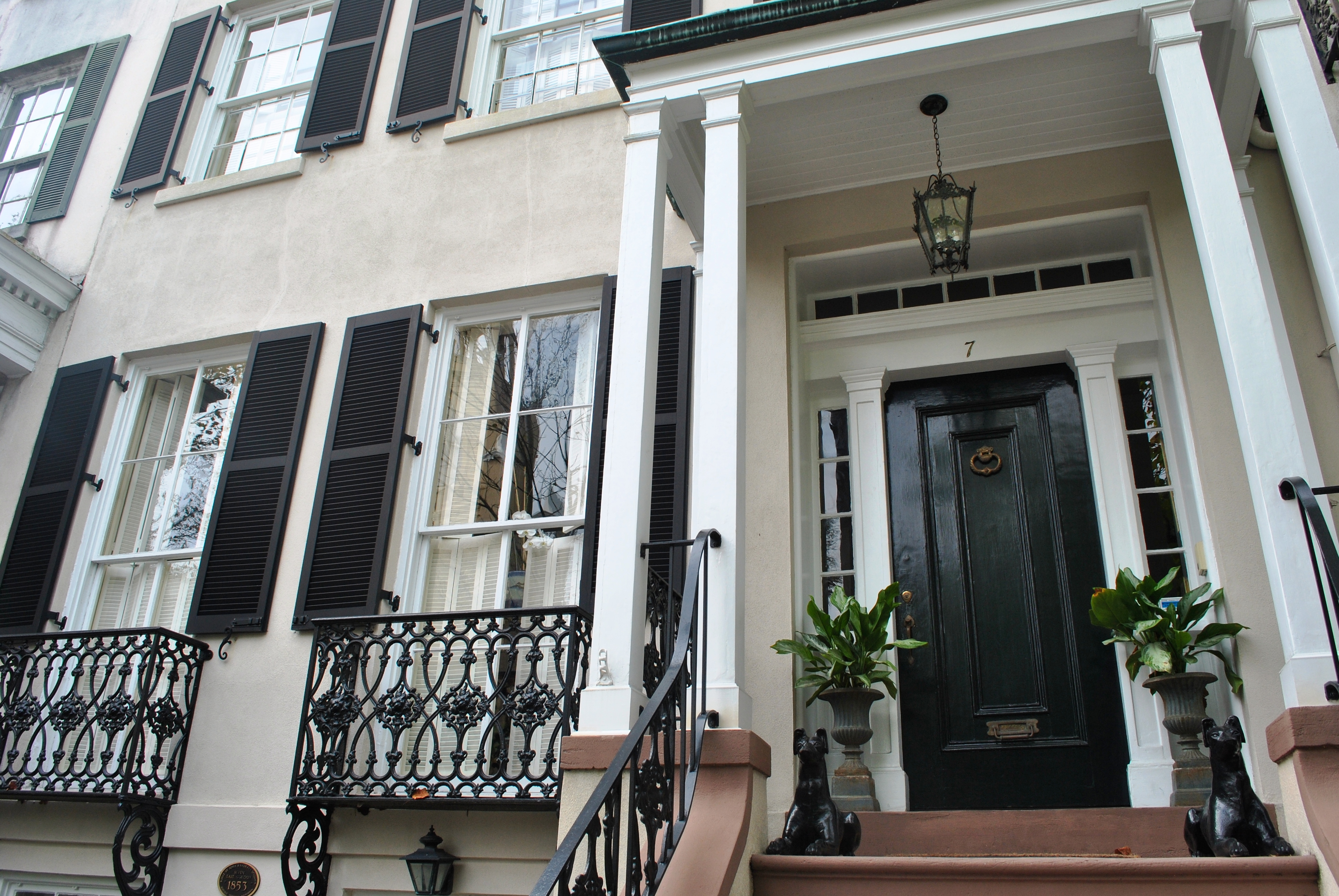
Door detail of no.7

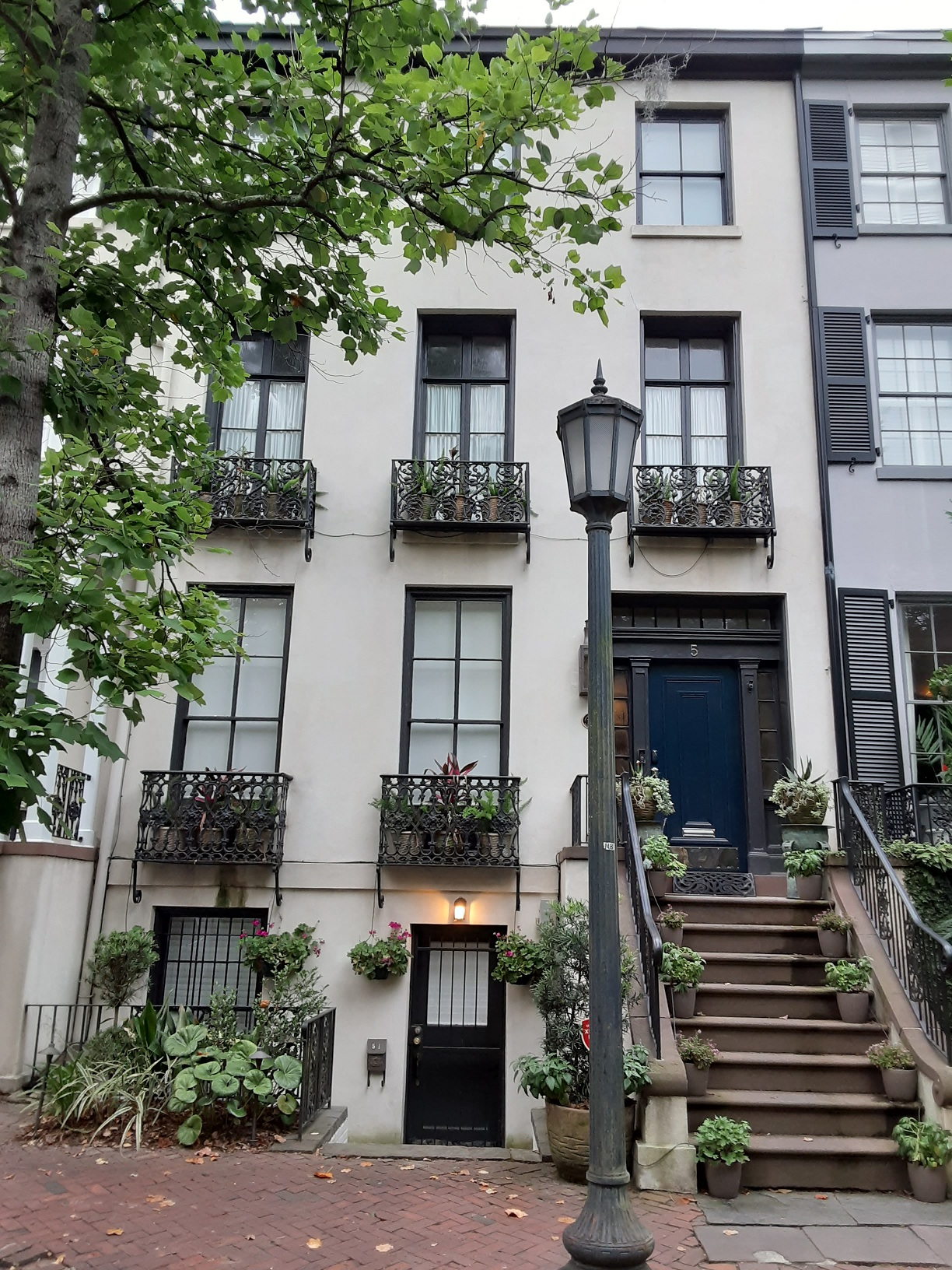
No.5

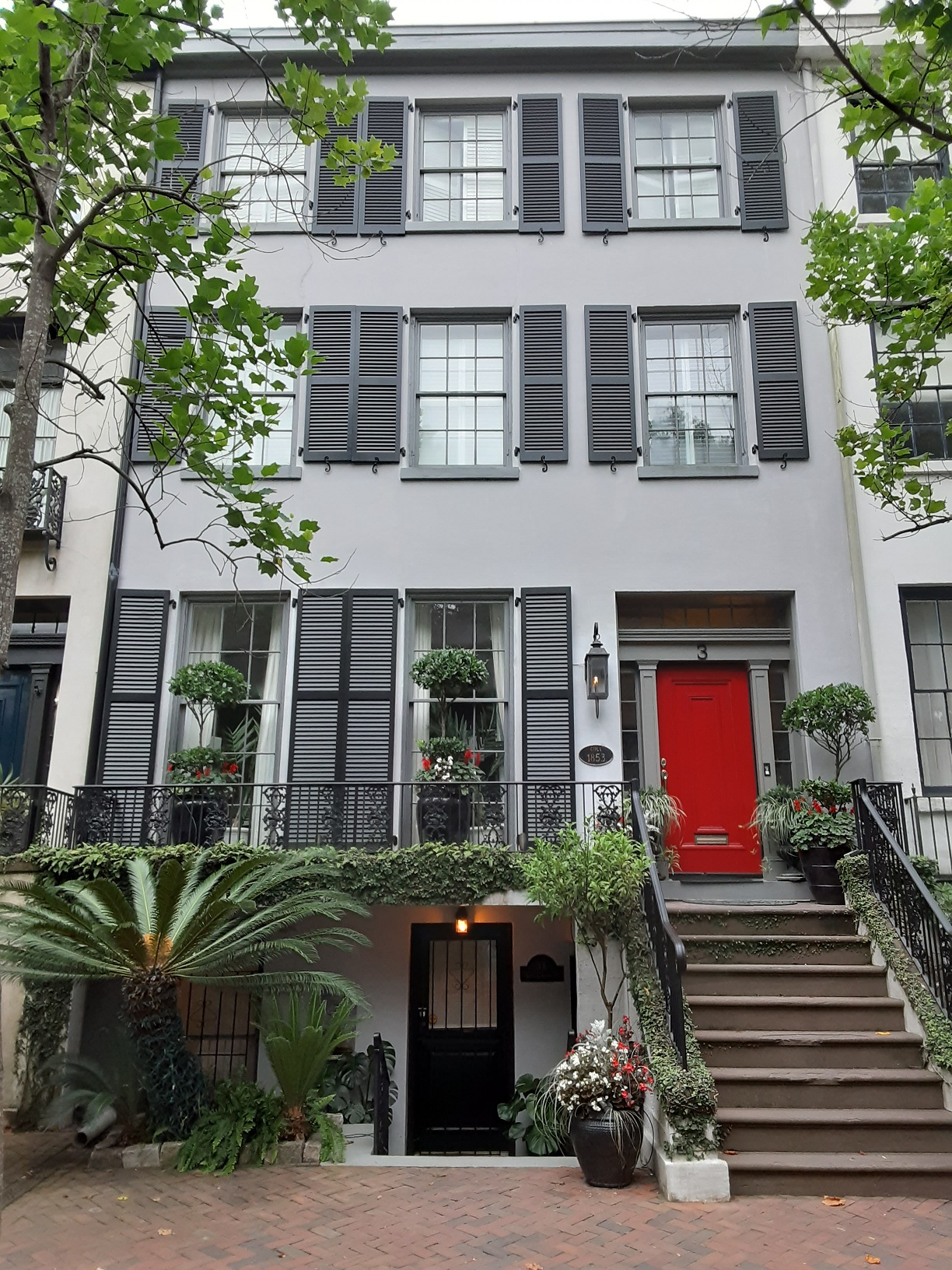
No.3

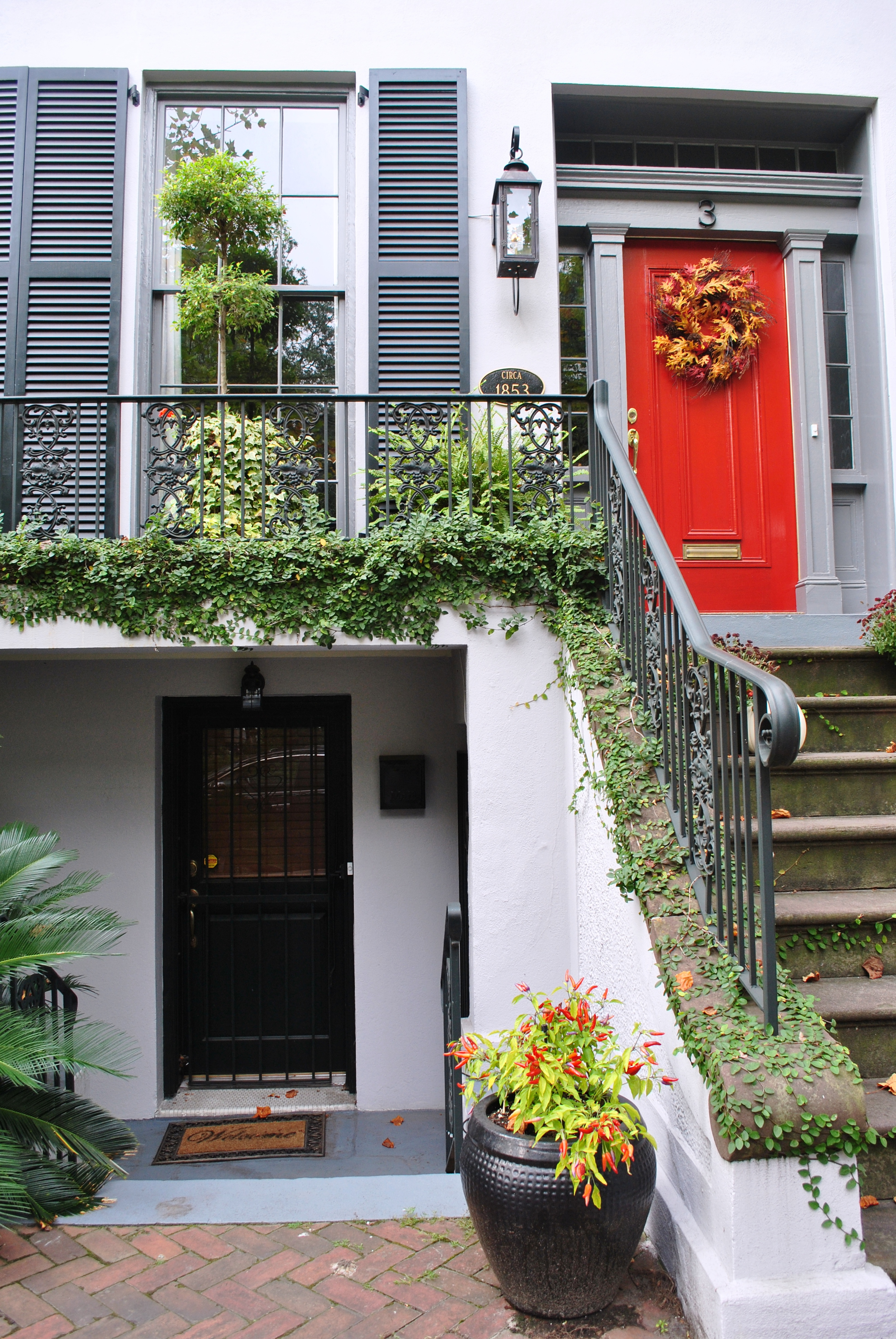
No.3, facade detail

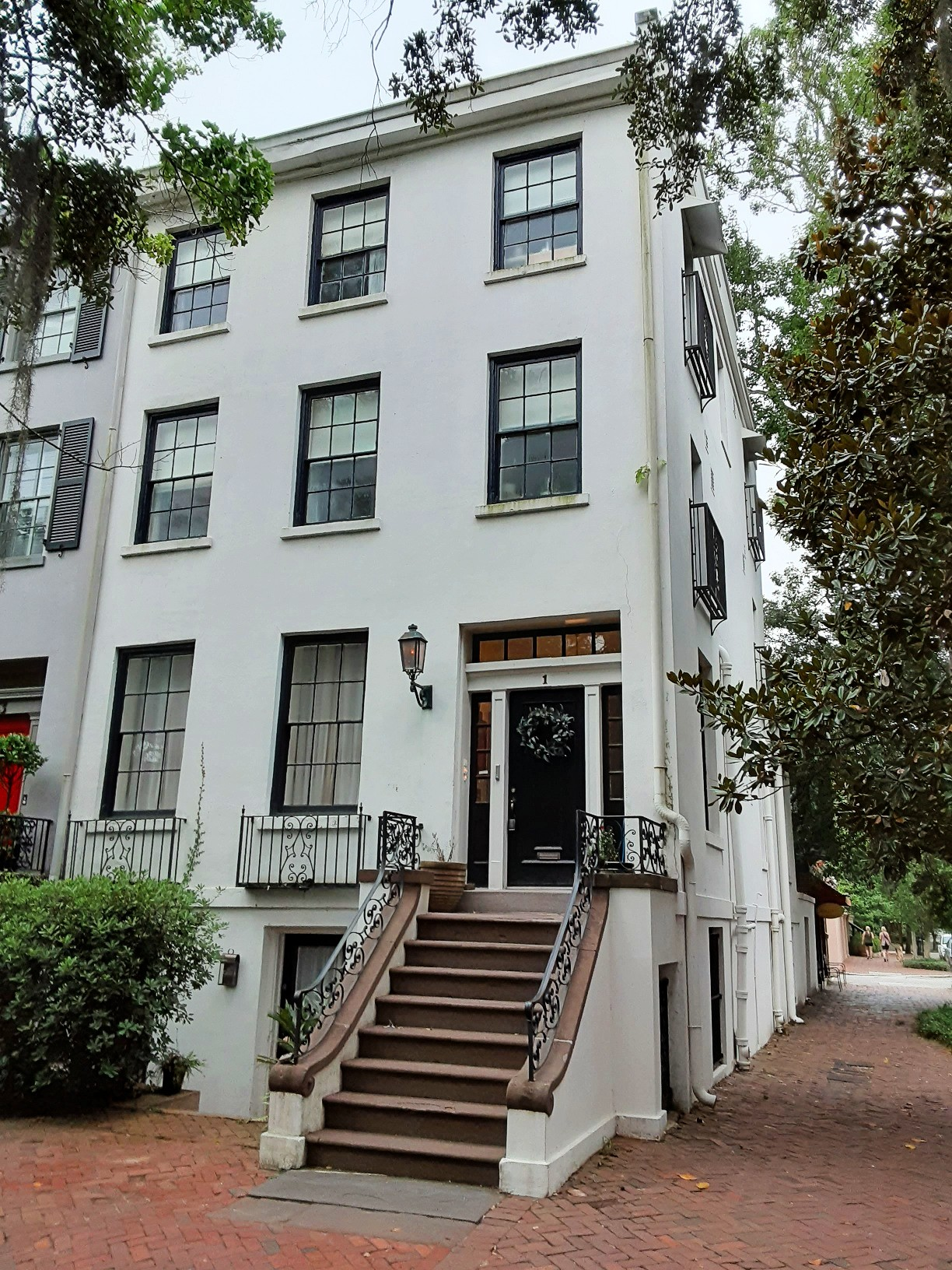
No.1

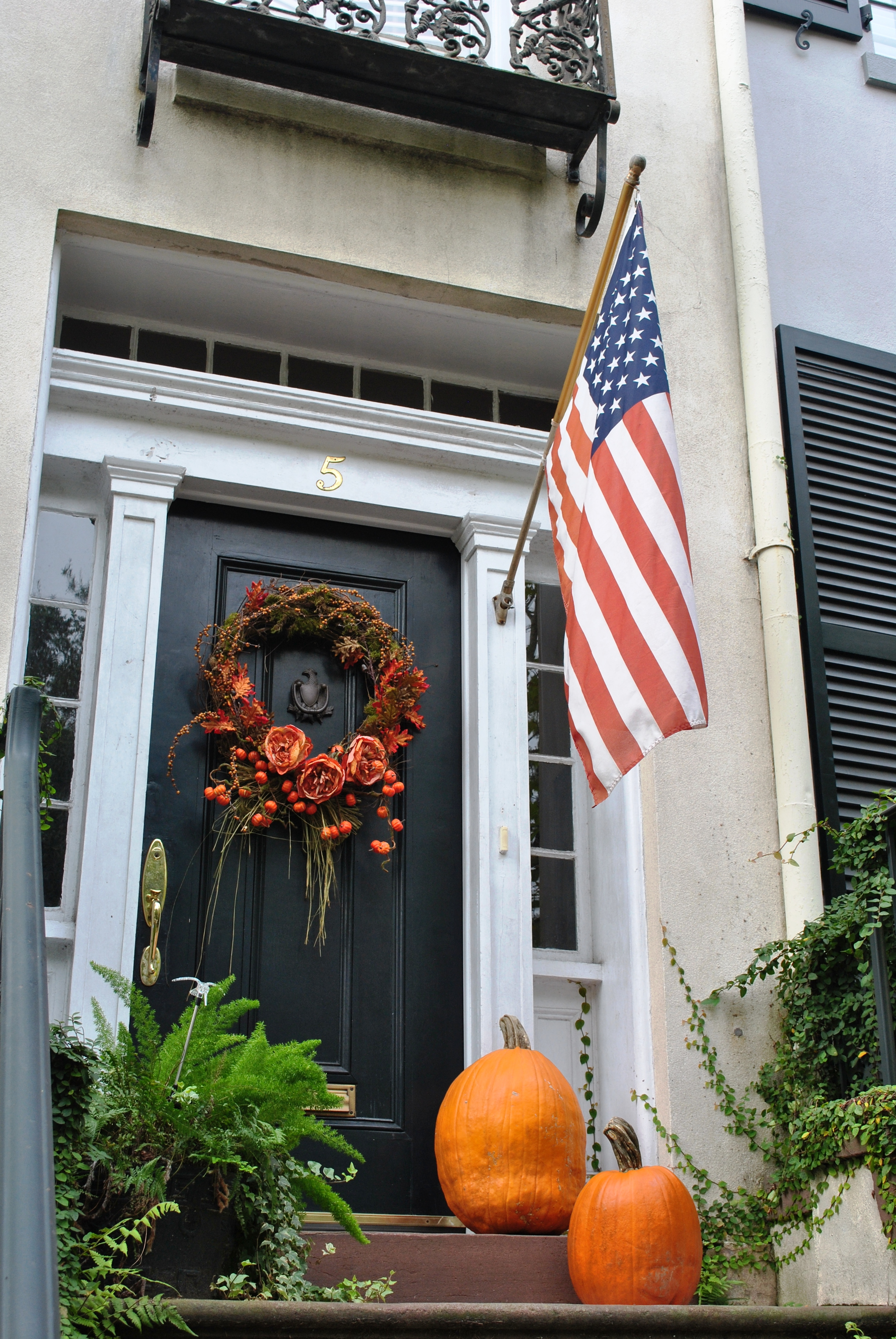
Door detail of no.5

== See also ==
- 11 East Jones Street, Savannah
- 15 East Jones Street, Savannah
- Buildings in Savannah Historic District
