= Gulla =

Gulla is a surname. Notable people with the surname include:

- Alejandra Gulla (born 1977), Argentine field hockey player
- Bob Gulla, American music historian and musicologist, music encyclopedia author, and biographer and writer
- Joe Gulla (born 1964), American playwright, actor and reality television participant
