= Geechie =

Geechie (and various other spellings, such as Geechy or Geechee) is a word referring to the U.S. Lowcountry ethnocultural group of the descendants of enslaved West Africans who retained their cultural and linguistic history, otherwise known as the Gullah people and Gullah language (aka, Geechie Gullah, or Gullah-Geechee, etc). It has been used as a nickname for persons originating out of this culture and ethnic group. The term derives from the name of the Ogeechee River, an area where many of them settled.

== People with this nickname ==
- Lillie Mae "Geechie" Boone Scott Wiley (1908–1950), country blues musician
- Julies J. "Geechie" Fields (1904–1997), jazz musician
- Norwood "Geechie" Johnson, funk musician, member of the band The Wild Magnolias
- Buford "Geechie" Meredith (1899–1932), Negro league baseball player
- Johnnie "Geechie" Temple (1906–1968), blues musician
- Saladine "Geechi Suede" Wallace, rapper and member of the hip-hop duo Camp Lo

== Characters ==
- "Geechee" Beatrice, an Oscar-nominated role portrayed by Alfre Woodard from the 1983 film Cross Creek
- Dan "Geechie Dan" Beauford, a character portrayed by Harry Belafonte, in the 1974 film Uptown Saturday Night
- "Geechy" Joe, a character portrayed by Cab Calloway, in the 1943 film Stormy Weather
