= First Baptist Church (Savannah, Georgia) =

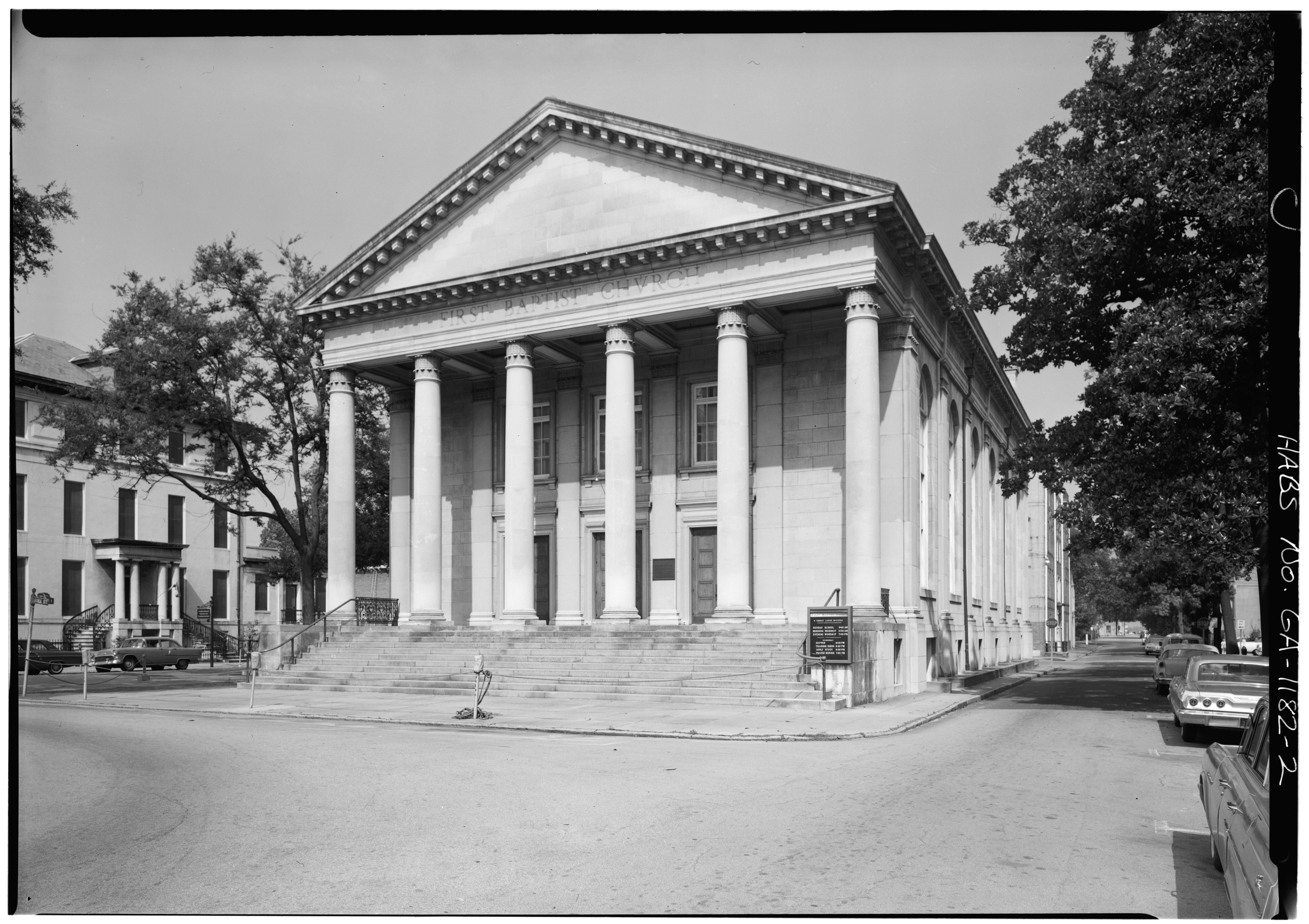
- Front view, First Baptist Church
- First Baptist Church (Savannah, Georgia)
- 32.0762°N 81.0939°W
- Location: 223 Bull Street; Savannah, Georgia
- Country: United States
- Denomination: Baptist
- Website: https://www.fbc-sav.org

History
- Founded: 1800

Architecture
- Years built: 1833 (193 years ago)

Administration
- Division: Cooperative Baptist Fellowship

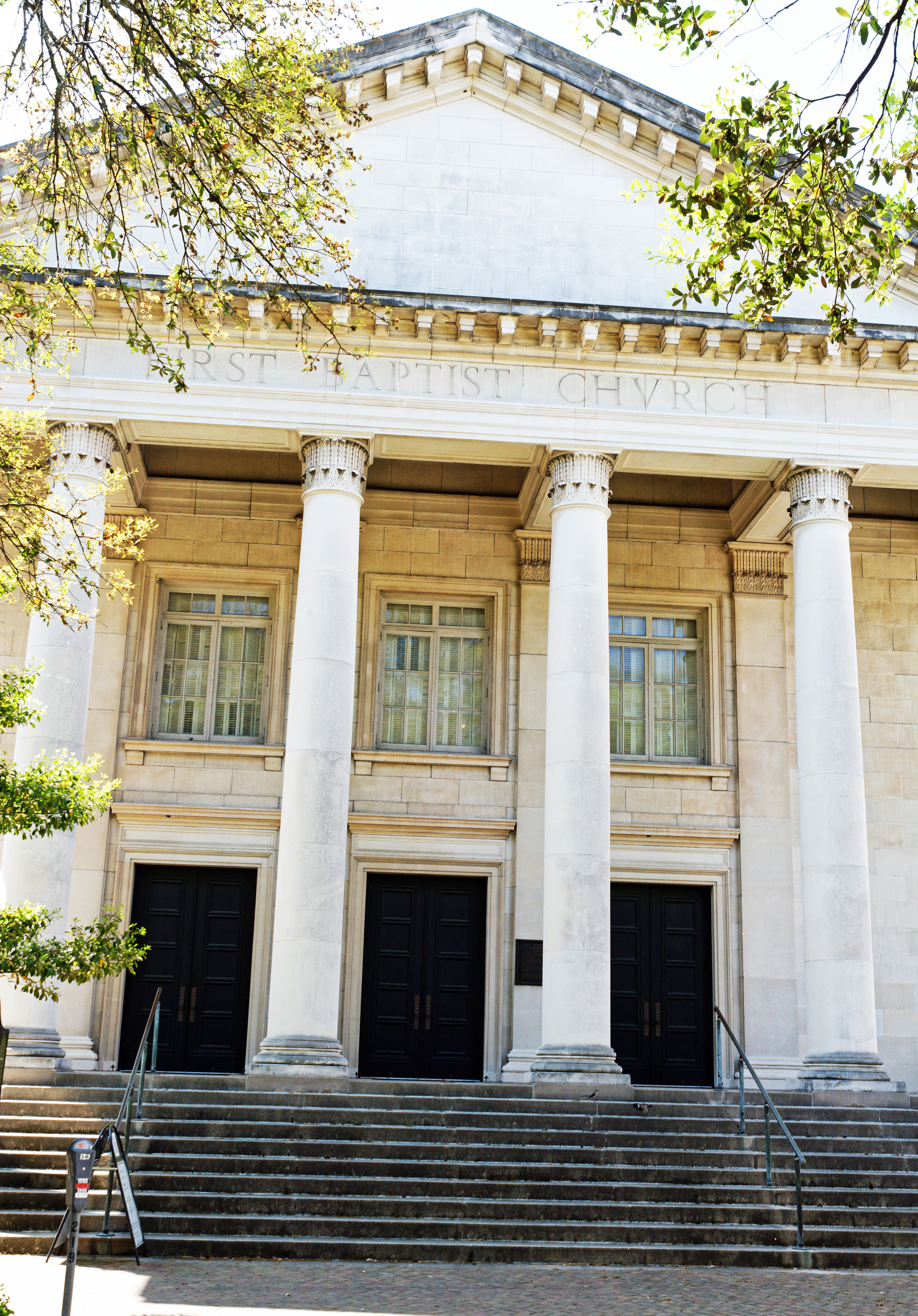
Front

First Baptist Church is a historic congregation in Savannah, Georgia, which was first established in 1800. Today, the congregation worships in a Greek-Revival church building on Bull Street, on the western side of Chippewa Square in the historic district of Savannah. This location has been the congregation's home since 1833 and the building is architecturally significant, being the oldest surviving church building in Savannah.

When initially chartered in 1800, the congregation worshipped at a meeting house on Franklin Square. The church received its perpetual charter the following year by Georgia governor Josiah Tattnall.

Josiah Penfield was a deacon at the church and provided in his estate for it. After he died in 1828, a brick church building was funded from the proceeds. It was named Penfield's Mariner Church and known as "the Bethel on the Bay." It stood on Bay Street and existed for twelve years.

The current church building was designed by architect Elias Carter. The cornerstone was laid on February 2, 1831, and two years later, with construction complete, the congregation relocated to its present location.

Six years after moving into the current building, the growing congregation began renovations to expand the sanctuary.

The church's organ, the work of Ernest M. Skinner, was installed in 1922.

By 1947, the congregation was using the name "First" Baptist Church to distinguish itself from other Baptist congregations in the city.

It is one of the few Southern churches to have remained open through the entirety of the American Civil War. The church utilized local architect Henrik Wallin for the notable alterations that occurred in 1922. Renovations included extending the front of the building, cladding the building in limestone, and removing the cupola.

Previous pastors include W. L. Pickard, later president of Mercer University, and Norman Cox, the executive secretary of the Historical Commission of the Southern Baptist Convention.
