= Savannah–Ogeechee Canal =

Waterway in Georgia, U.S.

- Savannah and Ogeechee Canal
- U.S. National Register of Historic Places
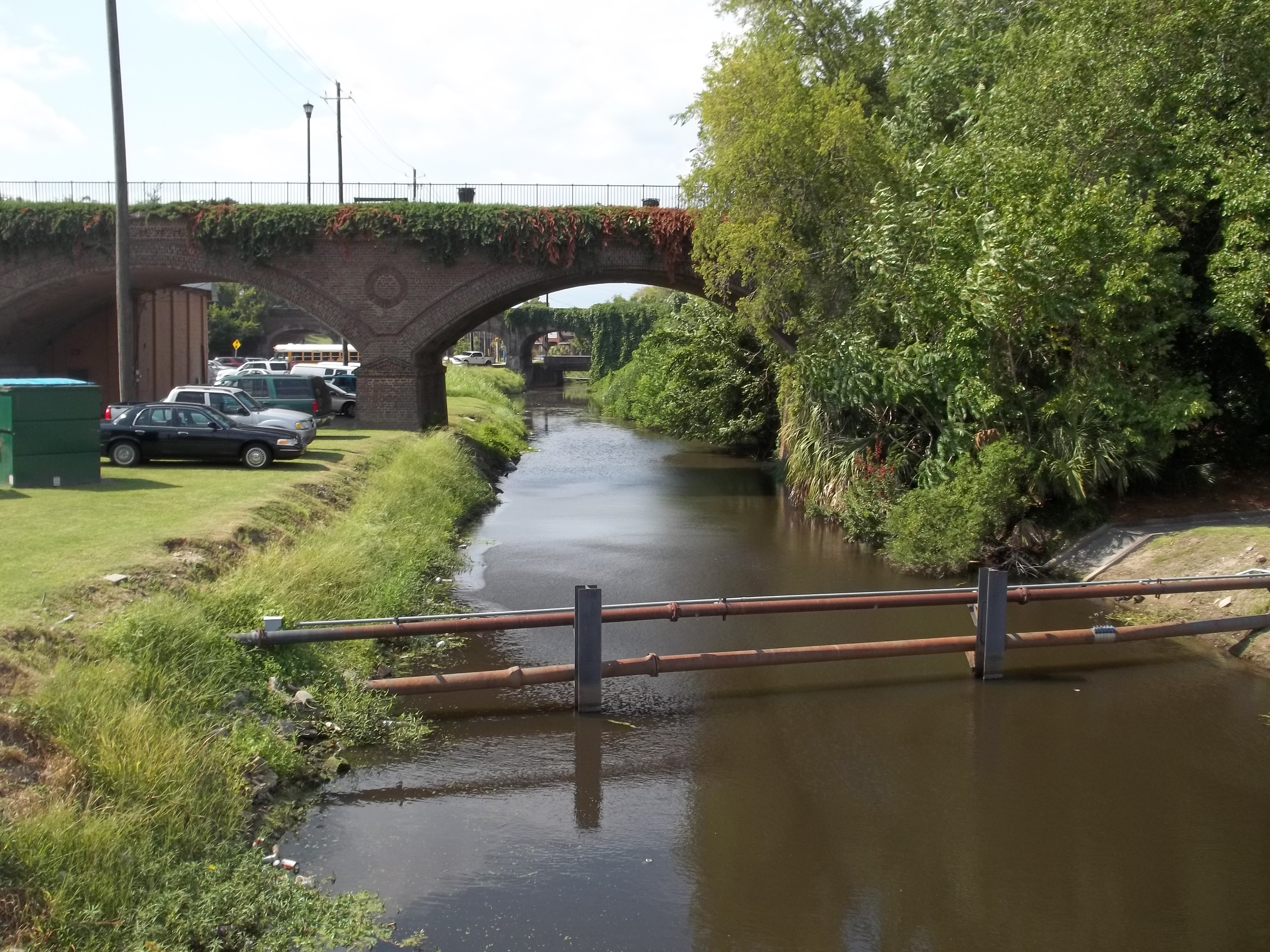

- Location within Georgia Location within the United States
- Location: Roughly along I-95, between the Savannah and Ogeechee Rivers, Savannah, Georgia
- Coordinates: 32.06112°N 81.22157°W
- NRHP reference No.: 97000814
- Added to NRHP: August 11, 1997

The historic Savannah–Ogeechee Barge Canal is one of the prime relics in the history of southern canals. Beginning with the tidal lock at the Savannah River, the waterway continues through four lift locks as it traverses 16.5 miles (26.6 km), before reaching another tidal lock at the Ogeechee River at Fort Stewart. Along the way, the canal passed through Savannah’s 19th century industrial corridor, former rice fields, timber tracts, and a still lush tidal river swamp and adjacent sandhill environment that is the characteristic habitat for several unique species of flora and fauna. Nowadays much of this area comprises the Savannah suburbs of Garden City and Pooler. The canal was added to the National Register of Historic Places on August 11, 1997.

== 1825–1890s ==
The Savannah - Ogeechee Canal was an important and profitable enterprise during the mid-nineteenth century. Originally chartered in 1824, the 16.5 miles (26.6 km)'s of canal was completed in December 1830. Numerous problems (such as decay of wooden locks and repeated erosion of embankments) plagued the canal during its early days of operation. The parent company declared bankruptcy in 1836. A new company was formed that widened and improved existing structures within the canal. From the 1840s to the 1860s, the canal generally prospered and became an important element in the south Georgia economy.

The canal opened to transport in 1831 and became an important partner in the economy of south Georgia. Its impact on the lumber trade was particularly important with one of the nation's largest sawmills located along the canal's basin. Cotton, rice, bricks, guano, naval stores, peaches, and other goods also traversed the canal. Later in the century, the canal suffered a gradual decline. Heavy June rains seriously damaged the canal embankments in 1876 coupled with a yellow fever epidemic which fatally inflicted over 1,000 individuals. The canal had become more a public health nuisance than an economic asset. By the early 1890s, the canal ceased to operate as a transportation corridor as the Central of Georgia Railway brought various wharves, warehouses, and canal frontage properties.

== Today ==
Now a century after the canal ceased commercial operations, local citizens have started to restore and interpret the waterway and its natural environment. In cooperation with Chatham County's Department of Parks, Recreation, and Cultural Affairs, the Savannah – Ogeechee Canal Society is working to turn the canal into a multipurpose linear park.

In addition, visitors can walk along a 0.5 miles (800 m) walk along the Heel or Tow paths to observe the waterway.

== Savannah-Ogeechee Canal Museum and Nature Center ==
Currently most of the effort is expended at the Ogeechee River terminus near Lock 5 where the Savannah–Ogeechee Canal Museum & Nature Center at 681 Fort Argyle Rd, Savannah, is open. Exhibits highlight the canal's history and the natural history of the local area. The museum also offers guided history and natural history tours of the area.

== See also ==
- Amos Scudder, who was involved in the canal's design
