= Bryan Street =

Prominent street in Savannah, Georgia

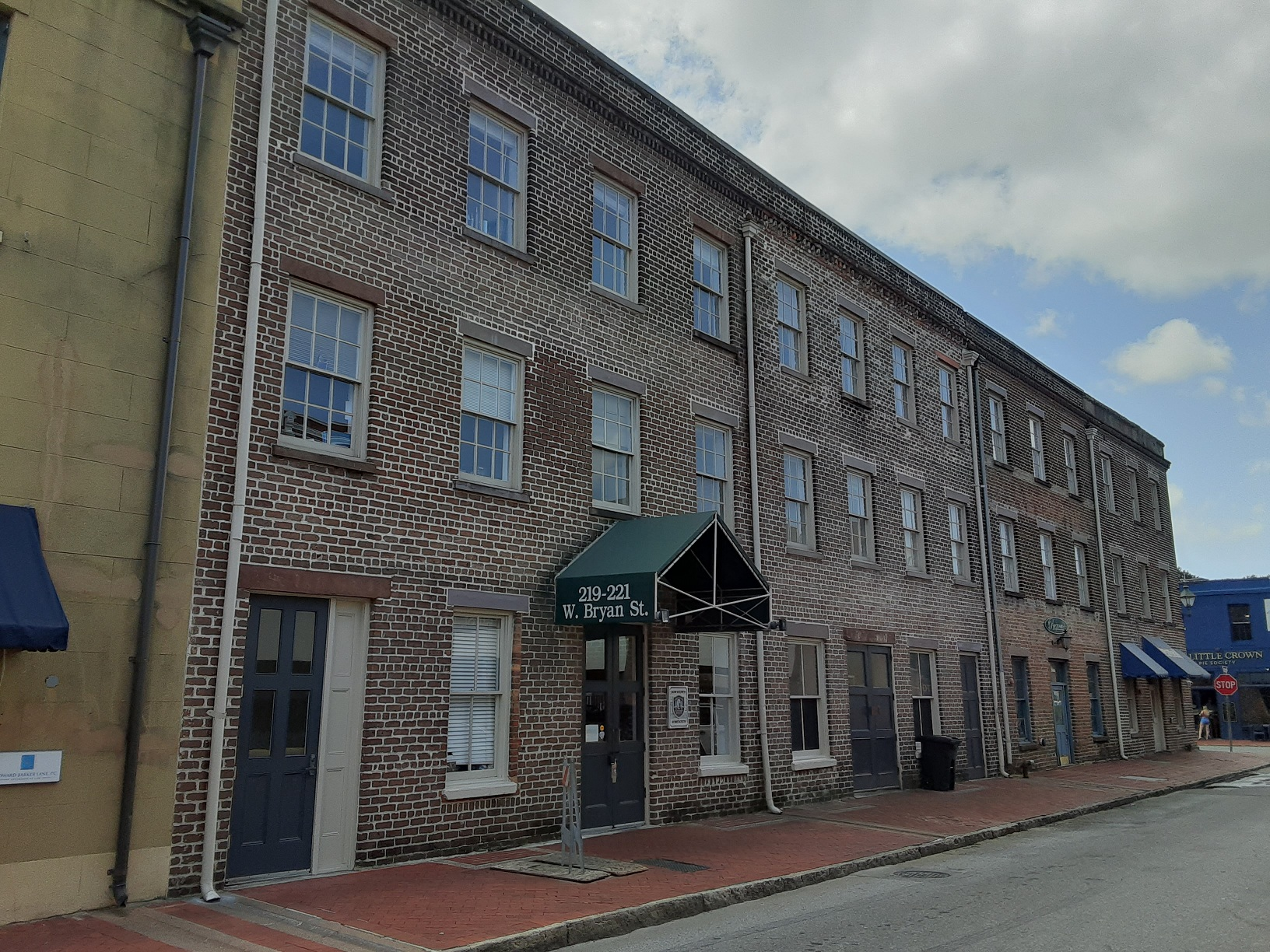
- 219–221 West Bryan Street in Ellis Square, looking west
- Namesake: Hugh, Jonathan and Joseph Bryan
- Length: 1.15 mi (1.85 km)
- Location: Savannah, Georgia, U.S.
- West end: Cul-de-sac
- East end: East Broad Street

Bryan Street is a prominent street in Savannah, Georgia, United States. Located between Bay Street to the north and Congress Street to the south, it runs for about 1.10 miles (1.77 km) from a cul-de-sac in the west to East Broad Street in the east. Originally known only as Bryan Street singular, its addresses are now split between "West Bryan Street" and "East Bryan Street", the transition occurring at Bull Street in the center of the downtown area. Bryan Street is named for the Bryan family (brothers Hugh, Jonathan and Joseph), of South Carolina, who assisted James Edward Oglethorpe in establishing the Savannah colony. The street is entirely within Savannah Historic District, a National Historic Landmark District.

Bryan Street passes through six squares on their northern side. From west to east:

- Franklin Square
- Ellis Square
- Johnson Square
- Reynolds Square
- Warren Square
- Washington Square

== Notable buildings and structures ==
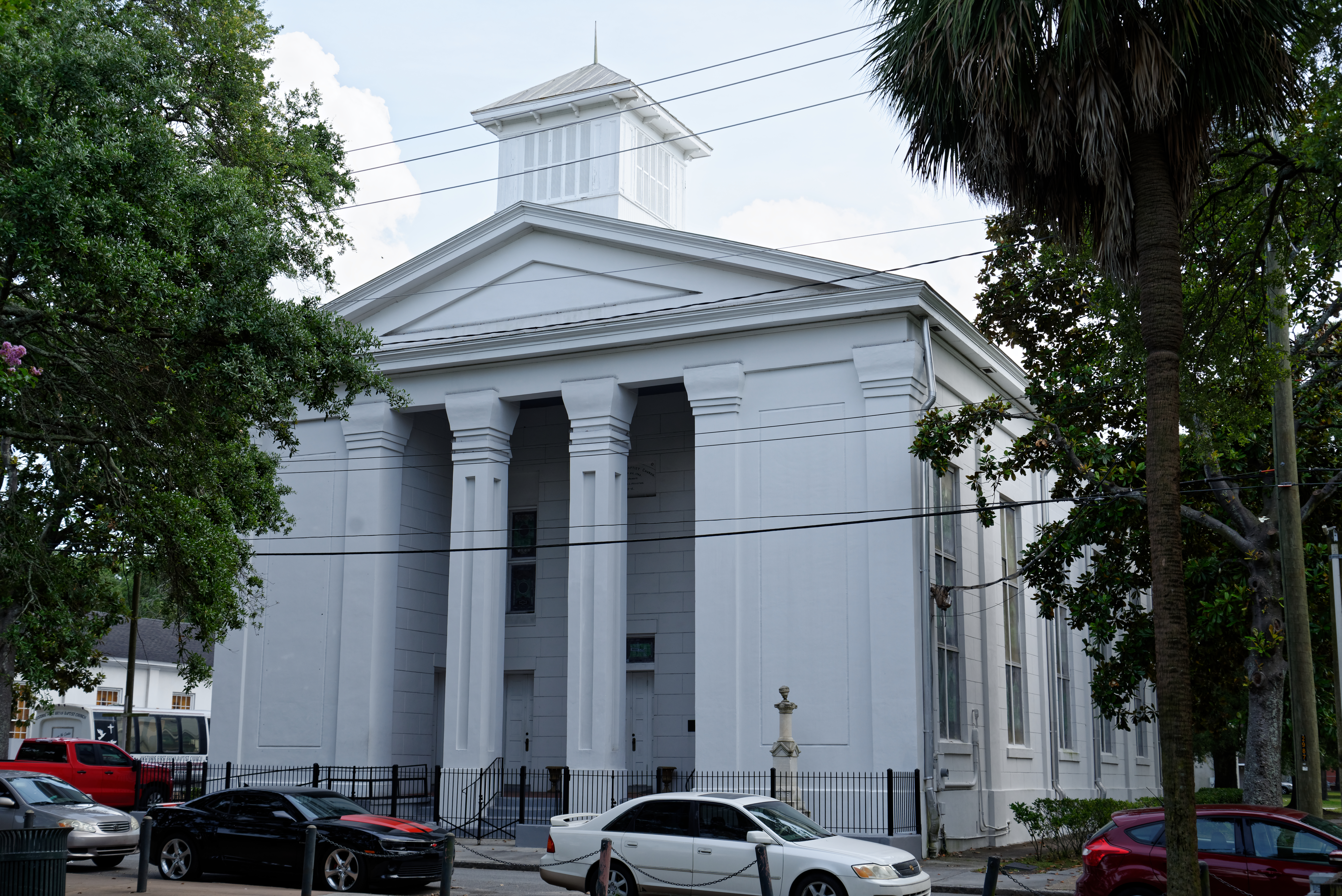
First Bryan Baptist Church, 575 West Bryan Street

Below is a selection of notable buildings and structures on Bryan Street, all in Savannah's Historic District. From west to east:

West Bryan Street

- First Bryan Baptist Church, 575 West Bryan Street (1888)
- Michael Alberino Property, 420 West Bryan Street (1912)
- 418 West Bryan Street (1910)
- Abram Minis Building, 317 West Bryan Street (1846)
- 305 West Bryan Street (1855)
- John L. Hardee Property, 22–24 West Bryan Street (1878)

East Bryan Street

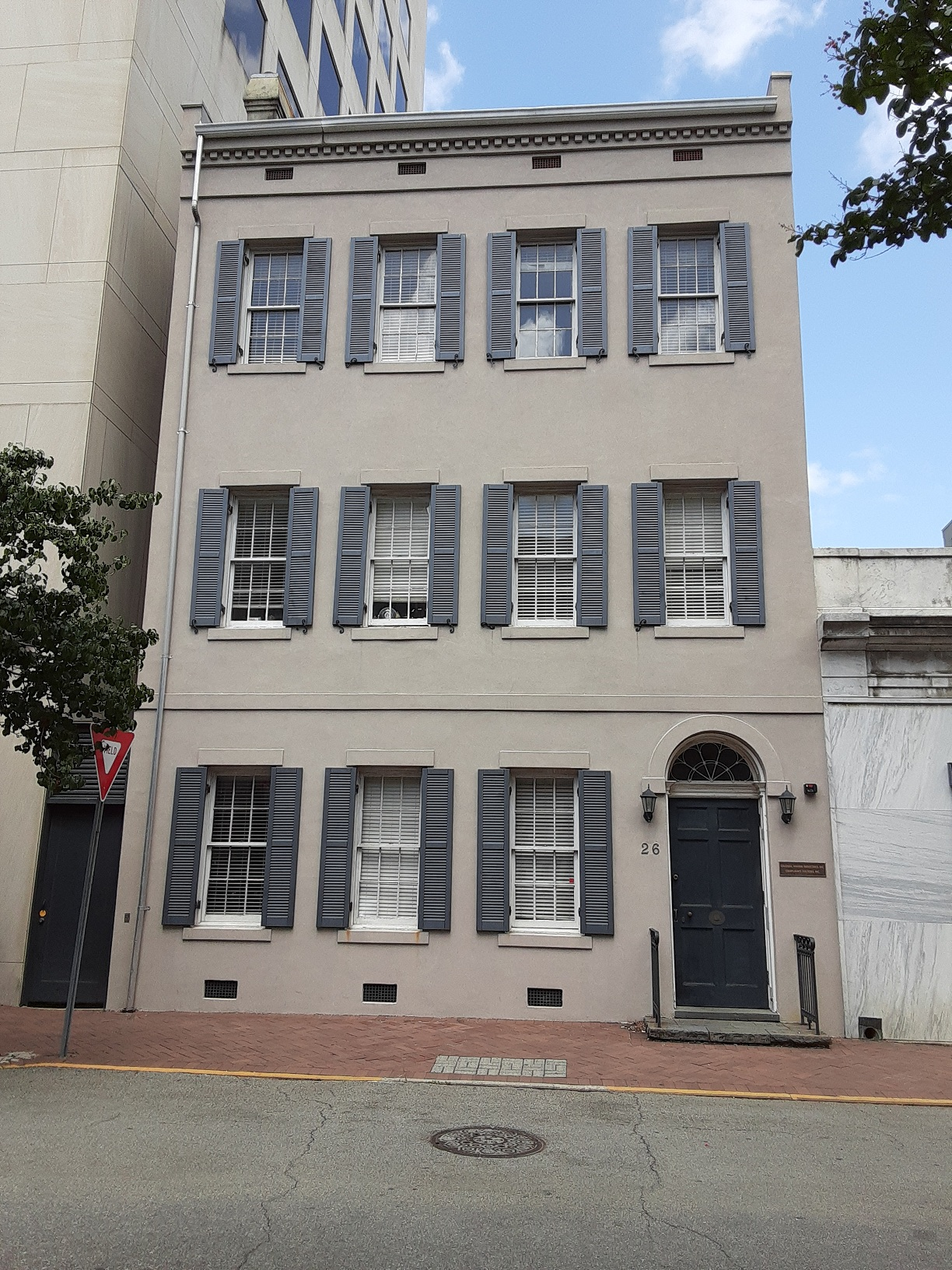
Ann Hamilton House, 24–26 East Bryan Street

- Savannah Bank and Trust Co., 2 East Bryan Street (1911)
- Ann Hamilton House, 24–26 East Bryan Street (circa 1824)
- Abe's on Lincoln, 226 East Bryan Street (17 Lincoln Street) (1852)
- John Eppinger (Estate of) Property, 404 East Bryan Street (1821–1823)
- Patrick Shiels House, 410 East Bryan Street (1848)
- Dennis O'Connell House, 416 East Bryan Street (1888)
- Mary Driscoll House, 418 East Bryan Street (1898)
- Margaret Prindible Property, 508–512 East Bryan Street (1892)
- Mary Gildea House, 514 East Bryan Street (1899)
- Mary Horrigan Property, 520–522 East Bryan Street (1899)

In 1849, the Georgia Historical Society moved into a new construction, a Gothic Revival building on East Bryan Street. The building was demolished in the early 20th century.
