= Manger Building =

Building in Savannah, Georgia

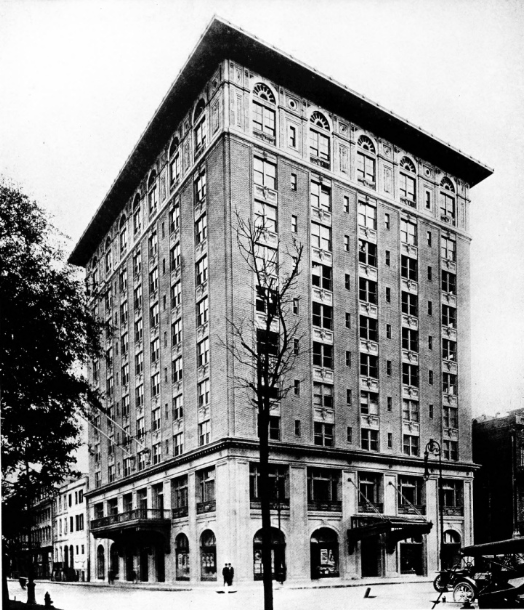
- Pictured around 1913, when the building was the Savannah Hotel
- Interactive map of the Manger Building area
- Former names: Hotel Savannah; Hotel Manger; First City Club of Savannah

General information
- Location: Savannah, Georgia, U.S., 7 East Congress Street
- Coordinates: 32.07942°N 81.09153°W
- Completed: 1913 (113 years ago)

Technical details
- Floor count: 10

The Manger Building is a commercial building in Savannah, Georgia, United States. Located on East Congress Street at its intersection with Bull Street, in the southeastern residential/tything block of Johnson Square, it is part of the Savannah Historic District. The building was completed in 1913 as the Savannah Hotel, replacing the demolished Hotel Screven.

The building was designed by W. L. Stoddart in the Beaux-Arts style. When it opened in 1913 (with Geo L. Albea as manager), the hotel had 200 rooms, with another 100 rooms in a 1921 addition. After the Savannah Hotel became the Manger Hotel, it became known as Savannah's "finest place for hospitality." Its rooftop Purple Tree Lounge was also popular.

Its use as a hotel ended in 1977, and it was converted to office space in 1985.

A renovation of the building, by Left Lane Development, becoming the flagship property of Recess Hotel & Club, was expected to be completed in 2026. It will include 221 rooms.

== Previous structure ==
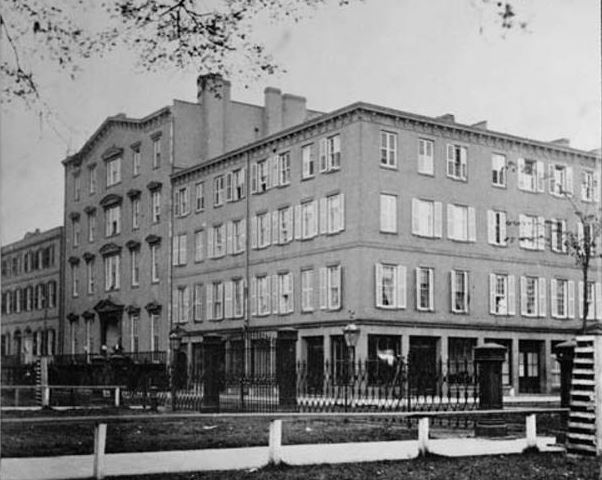
The Screven House Hotel, which formerly occupied the location
