= Nathanael Greene Monument =

Public monument in Savannah, United States

Coordinates: 32°4′47.7″N 81°5′29.7″W

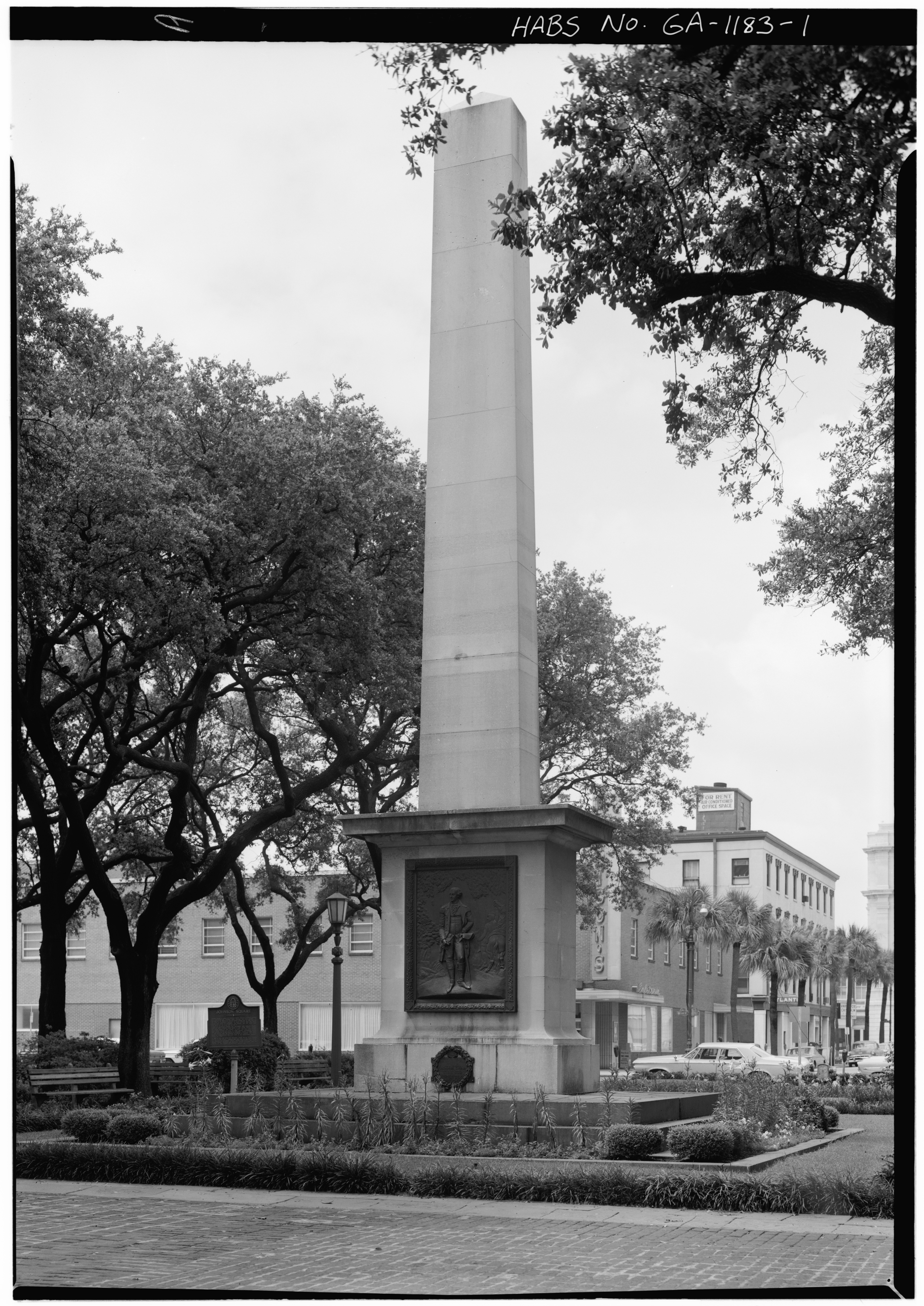
- Historic American Buildings Survey picture of the monument
- Interactive map of Nathanael Greene Monument
- Location: Johnson Square, Savannah, Georgia, United States
- Designer: William Strickland
- Material: Granite
- Height: 50 feet (15 m)
- Beginning date: March 21, 1825
- Completion date: 1830
- Dedicated to: Nathanael Greene

The Nathanael Greene Monument is a public monument in Savannah, Georgia, United States. Located in Johnson Square, the monument was designed by William Strickland and honors Nathanael Greene, a general in the Continental Army during the American Revolutionary War. While the cornerstone was laid in 1825, the monument was not completed until 1830, at which time it served as a joint monument for Greene and fellow Continental Army general Casimir Pulaski. The monument became solely dedicated to Greene in 1853, after which two bronze plaques honoring Greene were added to the structure. In 1902, Greene's body was reinterred under the monument. In 2018, one of the bronze plaques was vandalized with googly eyes, which drew national attention to the monument.

The monument is one of several in the city honoring notable individuals from the American Revolution, including the Casimir Pulaski Monument and the William Jasper Monument.

== History ==
=== Background and dedication ===
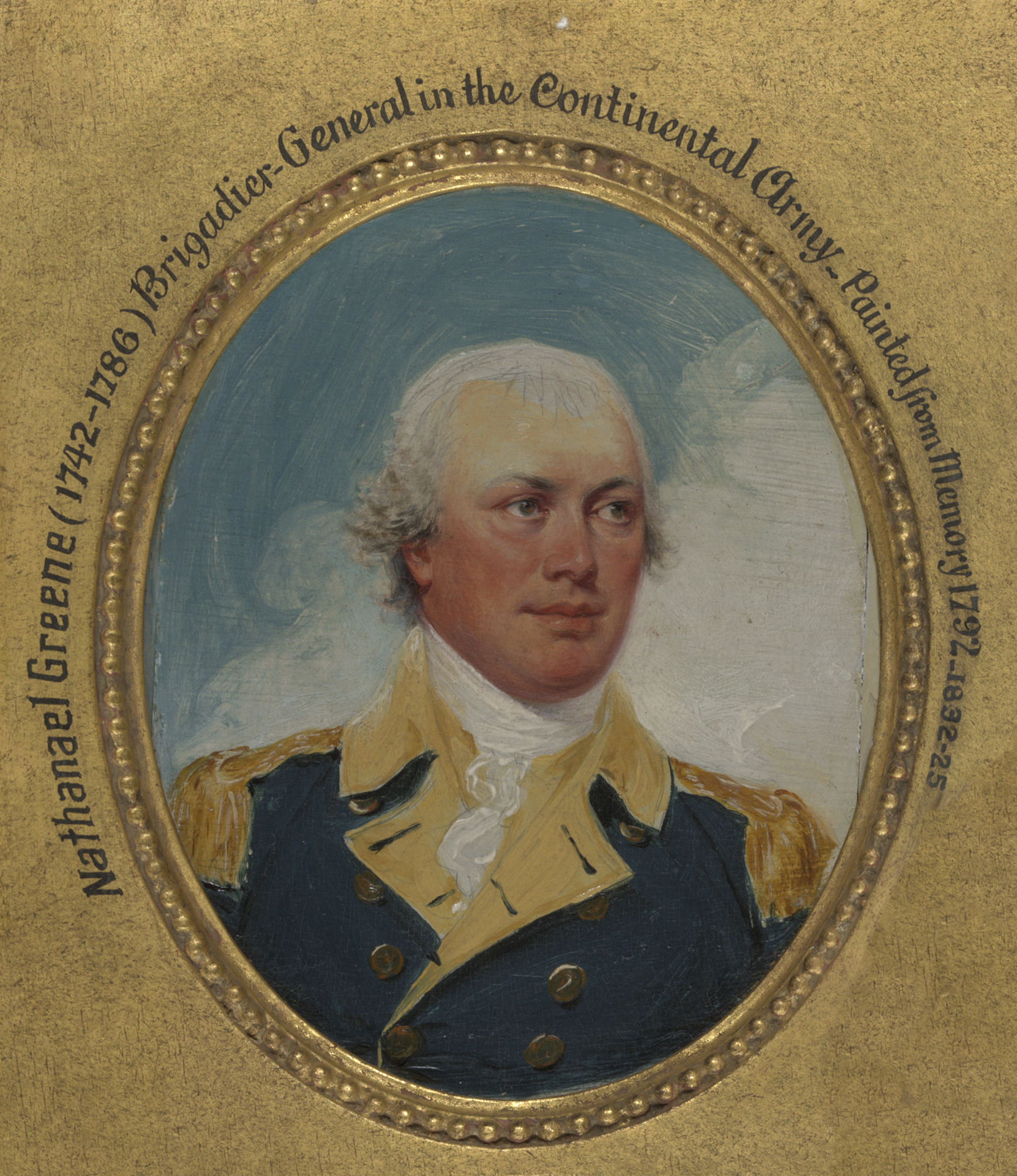
Portrait of Nathanael Greene by John Trumbull (1792)

Nathanael Greene was born in Rhode Island in 1742 and was raised as a pacifist Quaker. However, in the leadup to the American Revolution, he helped to found a militia in Rhode Island and eventually rose to the rank of brigadier general in the Continental Army. During the later part of the war, Greene participated in actions in the Southern Colonies, including in Georgia. For his actions during the war, the government of Georgia awarded him Mulberry Grove Plantation, a plantation seized from loyalists, and in 1786, Greene County, Georgia was named in his honor. He died later that year at Mulberry Grove and was buried in Colonial Park Cemetery in Savannah, Georgia.

On March 21, 1825, during his visit to the United States, Gilbert du Motier, Marquis de Lafayette laid the cornerstones for two monuments in Savannah. The two monuments were in honor of Greene and fellow American Revolutionary War hero Casimir Pulaski, with the Greene cornerstone laid in Johnson Square and the Pulaski cornerstone laid in Chippewa Square. At the dedication ceremony for the Greene cornerstone, held in association with local Masonic lodges, Lafayette said,

The great and good man to whose memory we are paying a tribute of respect, affection, and regret, has acted in our revolutionary contest a part so glorious and so important that in the very name of Greene are remembered, all the virtues and talents which can illustrate the patriot, the statesman, and the military leader…

=== "Finishing" the monument ===
Fundraising efforts for the erection of the two monuments initially went poorly, and in November 1826, the Georgia General Assembly authorized a lottery to raise $35,000 for the cause. Given the difficulties in acquiring funds, commissioners for the monuments decided to focus on erecting only the monument in Johnson Square as a joint monument to both Greene and Pulaski. The Johnson Square monument was completed in 1830, having been designed by William Strickland. In 1853, with sufficient money raised, a monument solely dedicated to Pulaski was erected in Monterey Square. (Note: The cornerstone at Chippewa Square, the initial planned location for the Pulaski monument, was moved to Monterey Square on October 11, 1853.) Following this, the monument at Johnson Square became the Greene monument. Following the 1860 United States presidential election, the monument was the site of secession celebrations preceding the American Civil War. During the celebrations, the monument was draped with a large banner that featured a rattlesnake and the phrase "Don't Tread on Me", similar to the Gadsden flag.

Celebrations of secession in Johnson Square, c. 1860

In 1879, the city council of Savannah organized a committee with the Georgia Historical Society to create a plan for "finishing" the monument. It was decided that two bronze plaques would be added to the monument, with the costs split evenly between the city council and the historical society. These plaques were unveiled in a ceremony on May 6, 1885. One of the tablets gave information on Greene's life, while the other featured a bas-relief of Greene. Former President of the Confederate States of America Jefferson Davis, whose father had served under Greene during the Revolutionary War, attended the ceremony and gave a speech praising Greene. During the speech, Davis also defended the Lost Cause of the Confederacy and urged reconciliation after the Civil War.

=== Post-19th century ===
While the exact location of Greene's grave in Colonial Park Cemetery was debated for several year, in 1901, his body was identified in a vault in the cemetery. The following year, on November 14, 1902, his body was reinterred under the monument. The remains of his son, George Washington Greene, were also interred at the monument. According to a 2014 article in the Savannah Morning News, the remains of the two individuals had been buried in the same vault and the decision to inter both of them was due to being unable to distinguish between the two. At the accompanying ceremony, the Savannah Chapter of the Daughters of the American Revolution placed a bronze wreath directly above the place of Greene's body. The Governor of Rhode Island and the president of the Society of the Cincinnati also attended the ceremony.

In 1953, the Georgia Historical Commission erected a Georgia historical marker near the monument that gave information on both Greene and the monument. In 2012, money was raised by a local garden club for the erection of a wrought iron fence around the monument.

In October 2018, the statue was vandalized, with googly eyes affixed to the bas-relief of Greene. The vandalism was reported on by multiple national news sources, including CNN, CBS News, and USA Today, among others. The Savannah-Chatham Metropolitan Police Department were investigating the incident for criminal trespass and possibly criminal damage to property, depending on the cost of the damage.

== Design ==
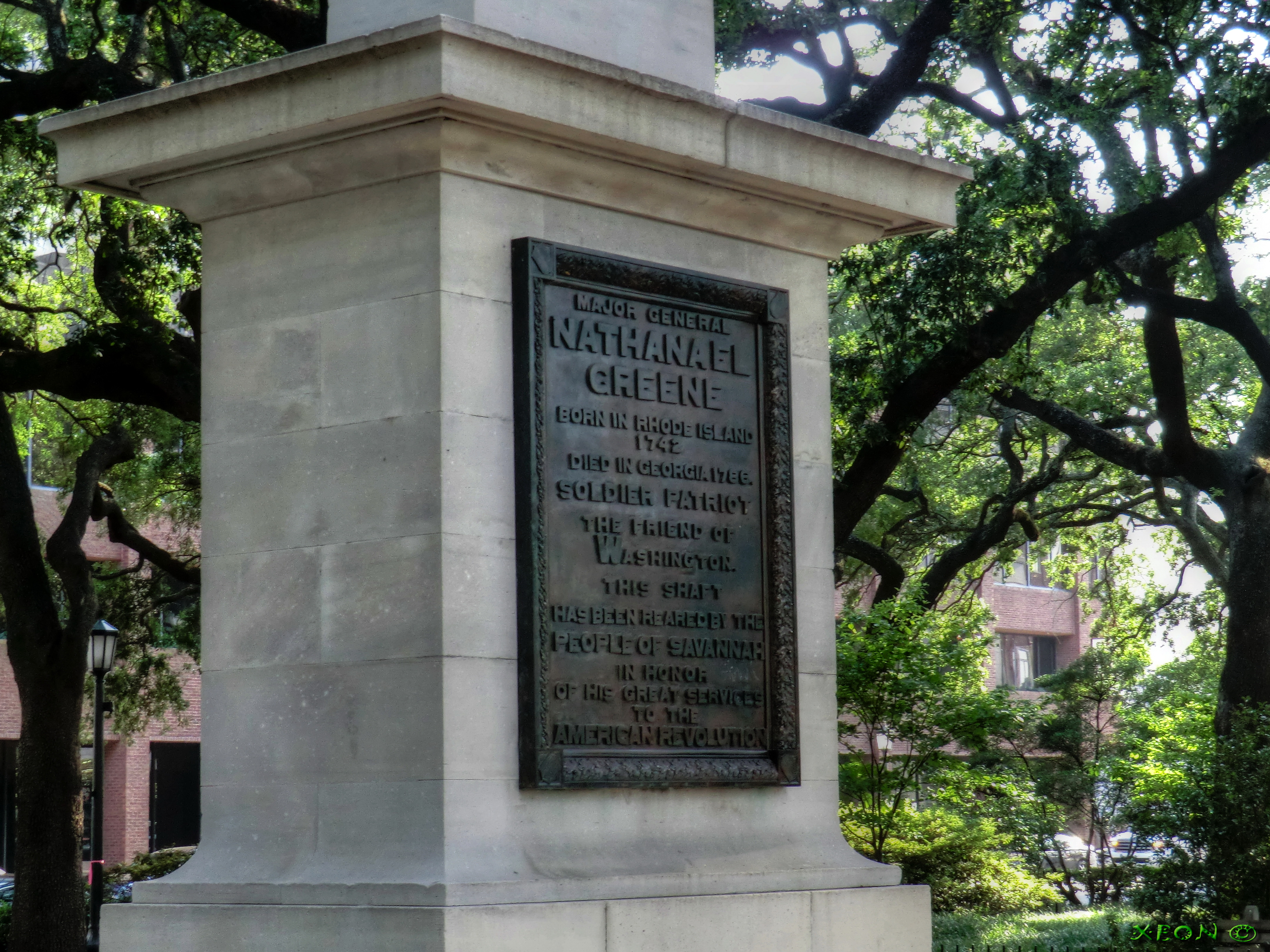
Informative plaque on the monument

The monument consists of a 50-foot (15 m) granite shaft. In 1853, bronze plaques were added to opposite sides of the shaft. One showed a bas-relief of Greene, while the other was inscribed with the following:

Major General

Nathanael Greene
Born in Rhode Island 1742
Died in Georgia 1786
Soldier Patriot
The Friend Of Washington
This Shaft has been reared by the
People Of Savannah In Honor
Of His Great Services

to the American Revolution

== See also ==
- 1830 in art

== Bibliography ==
- Curl, Eric (April 8, 2014). "Surveillance cameras added at downtown Savannah residents' request". Savannah Morning News. Morris Communications. Archived from the original on April 12, 2014.
- "Nathanael Greene Monument". Georgia Historical Society. June 16, 2014. Archived from the original on May 27, 2017.
- "Marker Monday: Nathanael Greene Monument". Georgia Historical Society. August 7, 2017. Archived from the original on September 21, 2020.
- Knight, Lucian Lamar (1917). A Standard History of Georgia and Georgians. Vol. I. Lewis Publishing Company. ISBN 978-0-7222-0901-1 – via Google Books.
- Lamb, Martha J., ed. (July–December 1886). Magazine of American History with Notes and Queries. Vol. XVI. Historical Publication – via Google Books.
- Lang, Cady (October 15, 2018). "Police Take 'Googly Eyes' War Monument Prank Seriously". Time. Archived from the original on August 8, 2020.
- Lee, F. D.; Agnew, J. L. (1869). Historical Record of the City of Savannah. J.H. Estill – via Google Books.
- Maltenfort, Lee (October 12, 2014). "Lee Maltenfort: You can't take history out of historic Savannah". Savannah Morning News. Morris Communications. Archived from the original on September 4, 2016.
- Mobley, Chuck (November 9, 2008). "Show of Support". Savannah Morning News. Morris Communications. Archived from the original on November 10, 2020.
- Molina, Brett (October 14, 2018). "Savannah looking for person who put googly eyes on historic statue". USA Today. Gannett. Archived from the original on October 17, 2020.
- Morekis, Jim (2015). Moon Savannah: Including Hilton Head. Avalon Publishing. ISBN 978-1-63121-070-9 – via Google Books.
- Park, Emily Hendree (July–December 1906). "The Historical Works of the Daughters of the American Revolution in Georgia". The Magazine of History with Notes and Queries. IV. William Abbatt: 216–219 – via Google Books.
- Peebles, Will (October 11, 2018). "Savannah police on the case after Nathanael Greene Monument gets googly eye makeover". Savannah Morning News. GateHouse Media. Archived from the original on October 27, 2020.
- Pirani, Fiza (October 12, 2018). "Police searching for vandals behind googly eyes on Savannah monument". The Atlanta Journal-Constitution. Cox Enterprises. Archived from the original on October 18, 2020.
- Politi, Daniel (October 14, 2018). "Savannah Police Look for Person Who Put Googly Eyes on a Statue: "It's No Laughing Matter"". Slate. The Slate Group. Archived from the original on February 25, 2020.
- "Downtown Garden Club provides fence for Johnson Square monument". Savannah Morning News. Morris Communications. December 20, 2012. Archived from the original on March 17, 2016.
- "Time Travel: Lining up for seconds". Savannah Morning News. Morris Communications. August 29, 2014. Archived from the original on November 10, 2020.
- "Today in Georgia history - Jefferson Davis spoke in Savannah". Savannah Morning News. Morris Communications. May 6, 2016. Archived from the original on July 5, 2016.
- Silverstein, Jason (October 14, 2018). "Statue of Revolutionary War general vandalized with "googly eyes"". CBS News. CBS. Archived from the original on October 17, 2020.
- Vera, Amir; McLaughlin, Eliott C. (October 15, 2018). "Googly eyes placed on Georgia historic monument; city says it's 'no laughing matter'". CNN. Archived from the original on August 20, 2020.
