= Lincoln Street =

Prominent street in Savannah, Georgia

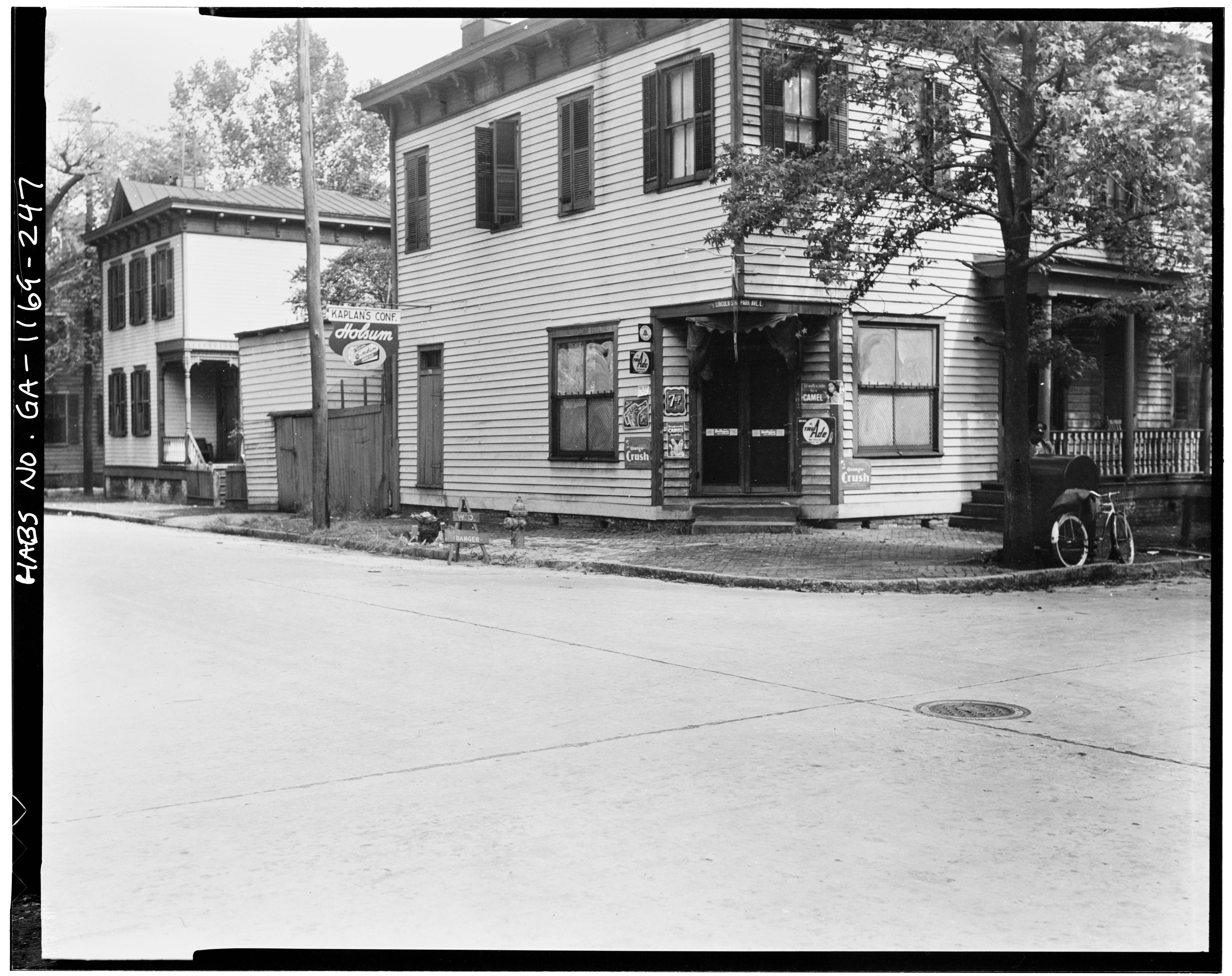
- Lincoln Street at Park Avenue (1934)
- Namesake: Benjamin Lincoln
- Length: 2 mi (3.2 km)
- Location: Savannah, Georgia, U.S.
- North end: East Bay Street
- South end: East Victory Drive (U.S. Route 80)

Lincoln Street is a prominent street in Savannah, Georgia, United States. Located between Abercorn Street to the west and Habersham Street to the east, it runs for about 2 miles (3.2 km) from East Bay Street in the north to East Victory Drive (U.S. Route 80) in the south. It is named for Benjamin Lincoln, a Revolutionary War hero. The street is one-way (northbound) south of Colonial Park Cemetery, which interrupts it between East Oglethorpe Avenue and East Perry Lane. The Lincoln Street Ramp leads down through Factors Walk to River Street and the Savannah River waterfront. Its northern section passes through the Savannah Historic District, a National Historic Landmark District.

Lincoln Street runs beside eight squares. From north to south:

To the west of

- Warren Square
- Columbia Square
- Troup Square
- Whitefield Square

To the east of

- Reynolds Square
- Oglethorpe Square
- Lafayette Square
- Taylor Square

== Notable buildings and structures ==
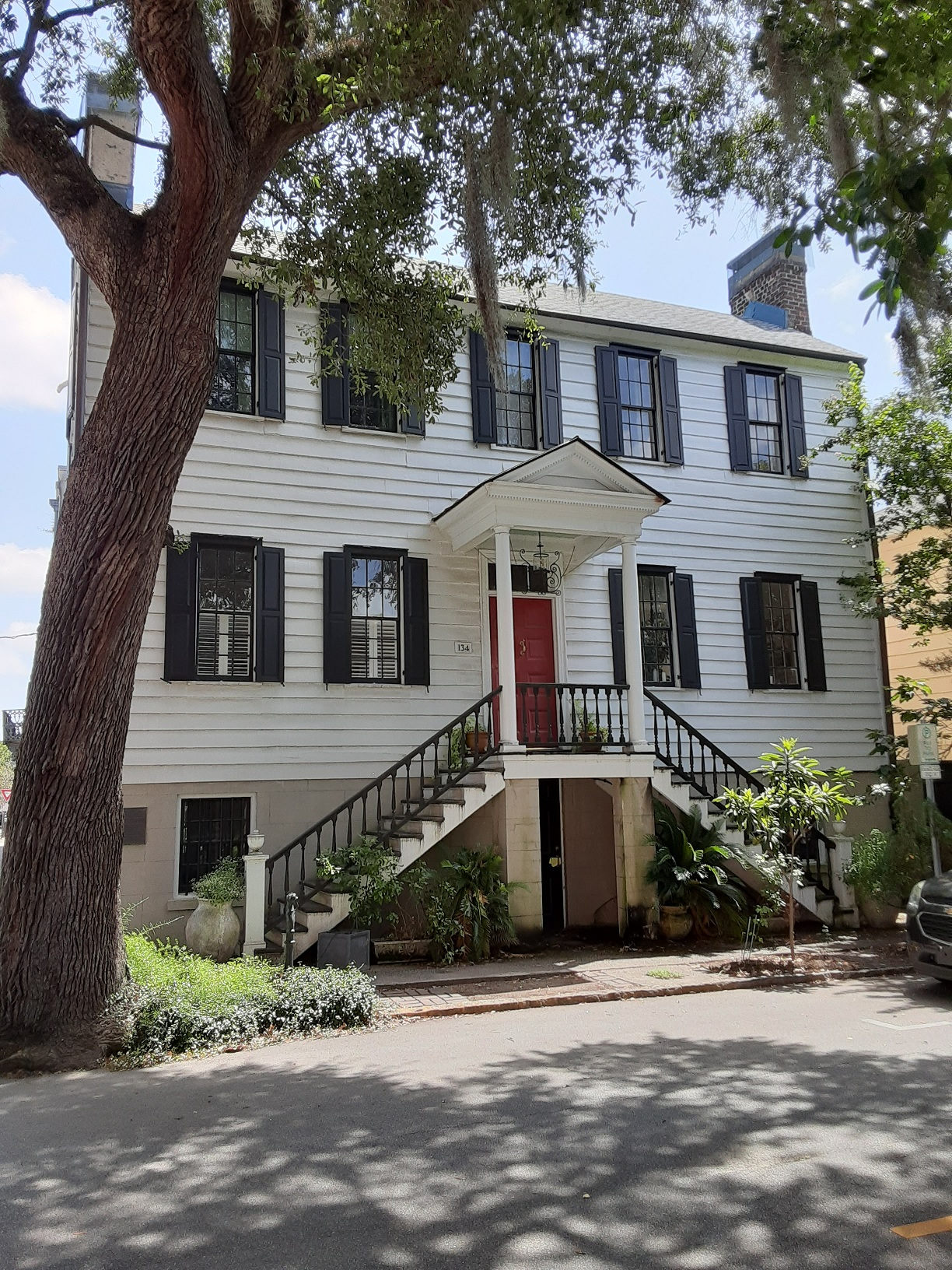
Joseph Gammon Property, 134 Lincoln Street

Below is a selection of notable buildings and structures on Lincoln Street, all in Savannah's Historic District. From north to south:

- 9 Lincoln Street (1853). In 2022, a judge ordered the building be demolished after a structural engineer found it to be "dangerous and unsound." It was subsequently decided that the building could be remodeled, with its historic materials kept intact.
- 17 Lincoln Street (1852)
- Gordon–Anderson Building ("President's Quarters Inn"), 127–131 Lincoln Street (1855)
- Joseph Sognier Property (I), 133–135 Lincoln Street (1886)
- Joseph Gammon Property, 134 Lincoln Street (1843)
- Joseph Sognier Property (II), 139–141 Lincoln Street (1886)
- John Staley Duplex, 346–348 Lincoln Street (1853)
- John Schwarz Row House, 436–442 Lincoln Street (1867)
