= 17 Lincoln Street =

Bar in Savannah, Georgia

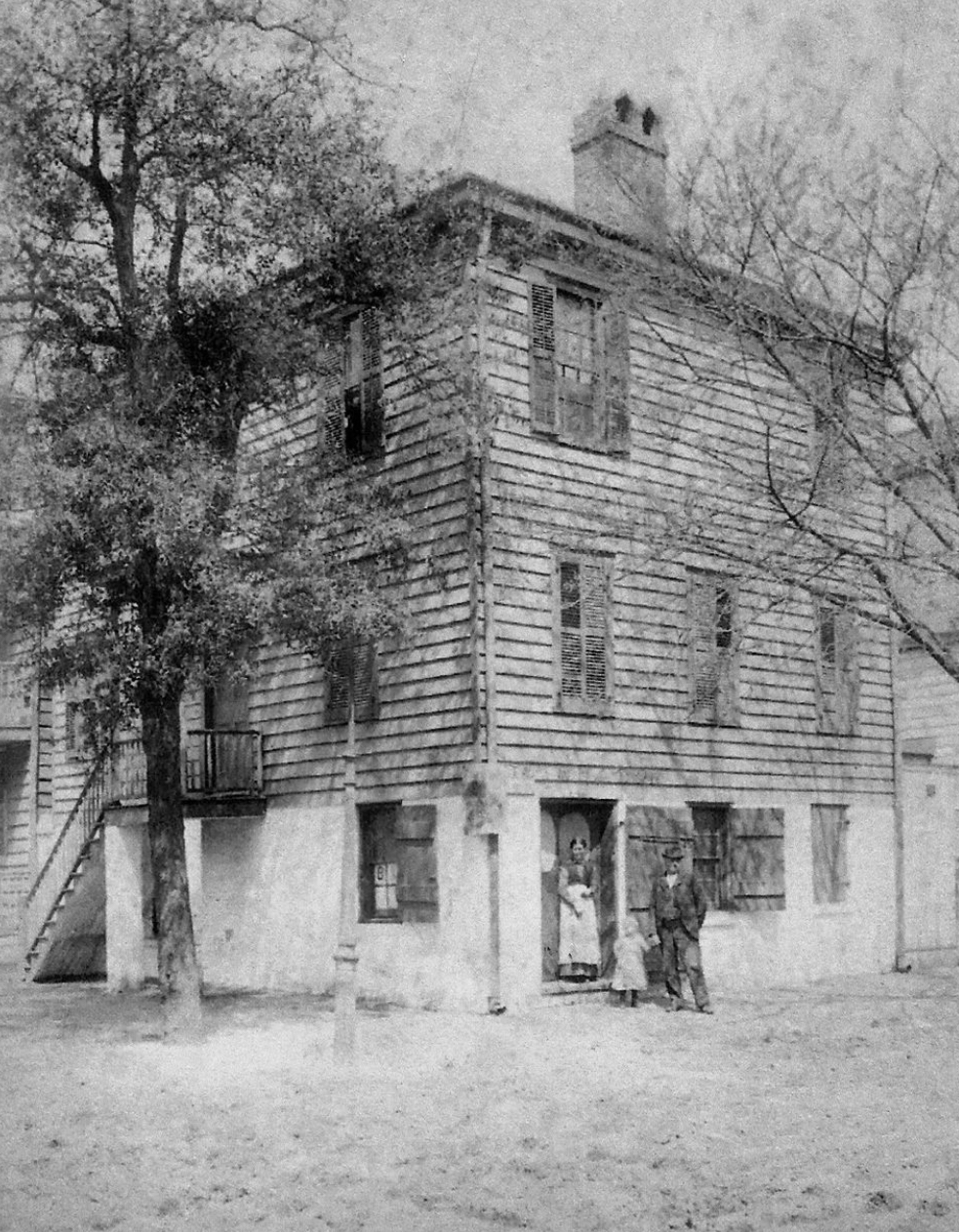
- The property around 1870. In faint writing above the ground-floor doorway is the name Thom Hansen, whose saloon it was at the time
- Interactive map of the 17 Lincoln Street area

General information
- Location: 17 Lincoln Street (226 East Bryan Street), Savannah, Georgia, United States
- Coordinates: 32.0794°N 81.0881°W
- Current tenants: Abe's on Lincoln (since 2010)
- Completed: 1852 (174 years ago)
- Owner: Bryan Hotel Investors LLC

17 Lincoln Street (also 226 East Bryan Street) is a historic building in Savannah, Georgia, United States. Located in the northeastern residential block of Reynolds Square, it is one of the city's oldest continuously running bars, having been in operation as such since 1852. Today, it is home to Abe's on Lincoln, a dive bar named for Abraham Lincoln (whereas Lincoln Street, the street on which it stands, is named for Benjamin Lincoln, a Revolutionary War hero). In a survey for Historic Savannah Foundation, Mary Lane Morrison found the building to be of significant status.

In 2019, a site plan submitted to the City of Savannah included moving the building (and two adjacent structures) two blocks to allow for the construction of a hotel.

An entrance on the building's southern elevation is for 226 East Bryan Street.

== History ==
Norway native Thomas Hansen (1833–1896) opened a saloon on the building's ground floor shortly after its 1852 construction.

== Abe's on Lincoln ==
Abe's on Lincoln has occupied the ground floor of the premises since 2010

A notable feature of Abe's on Lincoln, the bar that has had its home in the building since 2010, is the multitude of single sketches of Abraham Lincoln, done on napkins by the patrons of the establishment, which are pinned to its ceiling and walls. The tradition followed on from when an inebriated customer could not afford to pay for the drinks he had consumed, and instead asked the bartender for a napkin and pen, on which he drew "an impressive" portrait of the 16th United States president. The bartender pinned the sketch to the wall, which led to other patrons attempting their own versions, many with artistic license having been taken. The napkins are taken down periodically and "stored" when the Fire Marshall declares them a fire hazard, but the walls and ceiling are soon filled with the next round of sketches.

Abe's on Lincoln is owned by Brian and Jennifer Huskey's Gaslight Group, which (as of 2019) also owned Savannah's B. Matthew's, The 5 Spot and Blowin' Smoke Southern Cantina.

In April 2022, the bar's napkins were replaced with flame-resistant alternatives.
