= Johnson Square (Savannah, Georgia) =

Public square in Savannah, Georgia

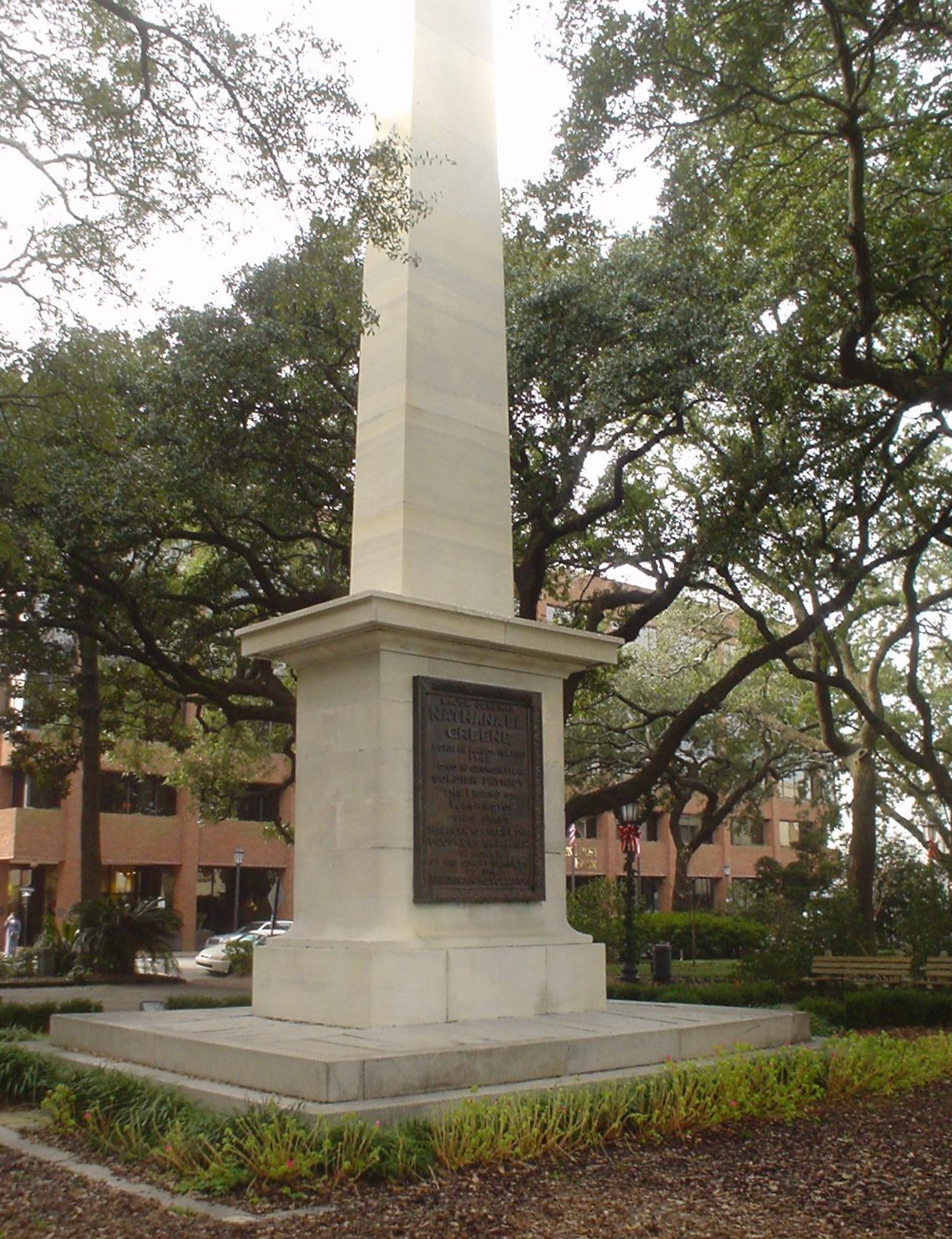
- The Nathanael Greene Monument stands in the center of the square
- Interactive map of Johnson Square
- Namesake: Robert Johnson
- Maintained by: City of Savannah
- Location: Savannah, Georgia, U.S.
- Coordinates: 32.0799°N 81.0915°W
- North: Bull Street
- East: East St. Julian Street
- South: Bull Street
- West: West St. Julian Street

Construction
- Completion: 1733 (293 years ago)

Johnson Square is one of the squares of Savannah, Georgia, United States. Located in the northernmost row of the city's five rows of squares, it was the first of the squares to be laid out, in 1733, and remains the largest of the 22 squares. It is east of Ellis Square, west of Reynolds Square and north of Wright Square. Situated on Bull Street and St. Julian Street, it is named for Robert Johnson, colonial governor of South Carolina and a friend of General James Oglethorpe. The oldest building on the square is the Ann Hamilton House, at 26 East Bryan Street, which dates to 1824.

Interred under his monument in the square is Revolutionary War hero General Nathanael Greene, the namesake of nearby Greene Square. Greene died in 1786 and was buried in Savannah's Colonial Park Cemetery. His son was buried beside him after drowning in the Savannah River in 1793. Following vandalism of the cemetery by occupying Union forces during the Civil War the location of Greene's burial was lost. After the remains were re-identified, Greene and his son were moved to Johnson Square. An obelisk in the center of the square now serves as a memorial to General Greene. The cornerstone of the monument was laid by Gilbert du Motier, Marquis de Lafayette, in 1825. At that time, the obelisk did not commemorate any specific individual or event. In fact, due to financial restrictions the unmarked obelisk served for several years as a joint monument to both Greene and Casimir Pulaski. Inscriptions honoring Greene were added in 1886, but his physical remains did not arrive until 1901, following their "rediscovery."

Johnson Square contains two fountains, as well as a sundial.

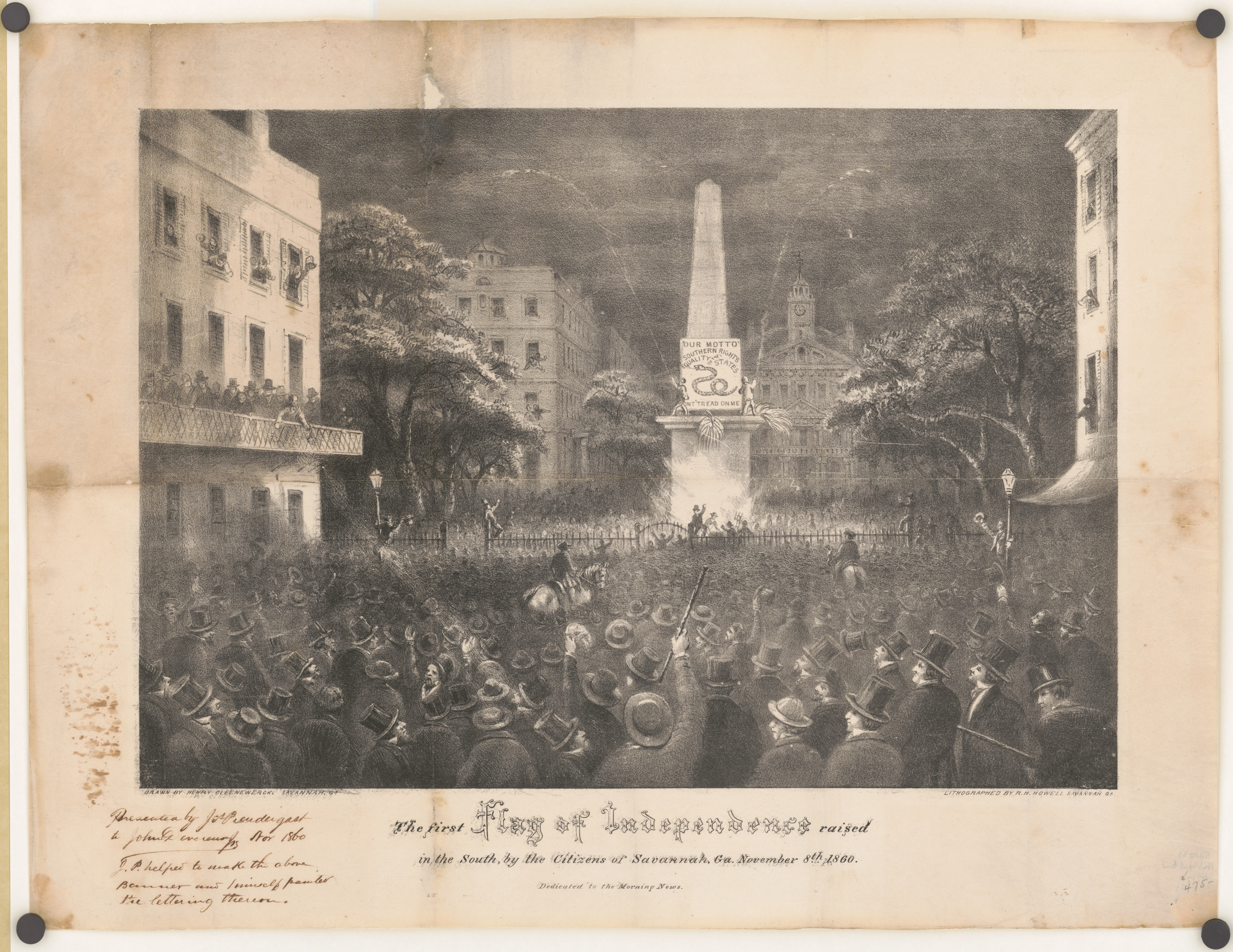
Henry Cleenewerck's drawing of the first flag of independence raised in the South (November 8, 1860)

Another landmark of Johnson Square is the Johnson Square Business Center. This building, formerly known as the Savannah Bank Building, was the city's first "skyscraper", built in 1911. Johnson Square is known as the financial district, or banking square, and many of the city's financial services companies are located here. These companies include the Savannah Bancorp, Savannah Bank, Coastal Bank Headquarters, Bank of America branch, SunTrust branch, TitleMax Corporate Headquarters, and a Regions Bank building. Christ Church Episcopal occupies the southeastern trust lot of the square at 28 Bull Street. Christ Church is "the Mother Church of Georgia", established in 1733. Early clergy of the church include John Wesley and George Whitefield.

The first flag of independence raised in the South was in Johnson Square on November 8, 1860.

The Pulaski House Hotel was in operation in the northwestern corner of the square between 1835 and 1948. It was torn down eight years later. Regions Bank stands in its place, as of 2023.

Screven House Hotel stood at the corner of Bull Street and Congress Street in the late 19th and early 20th centuries. It was demolished and replaced, in 1913, by the Savannah Hotel (featuring the popular Purple Tree Lounge), which became the Manger Building.

== Markers and structures ==
Object	Image	Note
Historical marker		Erected by the Georgia Historical Commission in 1955.
Sundial		Dedicated to Colonel William Bull, the namesake of Savannah's Bull Street. Bull was a South Carolinian who assisted General James Oglethorpe with the establishment of Savannah and, as a surveyor, laid out the original street grid. The sundial has four panels, one on each side of its square granite base. The dial itself is bronze, set atop a marble shaft. One of the base panels reproduces a 1734 map of Savannah.
Fountain		One of the square's two fountains, with Christ Church in the background.

== Constituent buildings ==
Each building below is in one of the eight blocks around the square composed of four residential "tything" blocks and four civic ("trust") blocks, now known as the Oglethorpe Plan. They are listed with construction years where known.

Northwestern residential/tything block

- 10 Whitaker Street (1878)
- 18 West Bryan Street (1912)
- John L. Hardee Property, 22–24 West Bryan Street (1878)

Southwestern trust/civic block

- United Community Bank, 27 Bull Street (1912)

Northeastern residential/tything block

- Johnson Square Business Center, 2 East Bryan Street (1911) – former Savannah Bank and Trust Building
- Ann Hamilton House, 24–26 East Bryan Street (1824) – oldest building on the square
- 30–32 East Bryan Street (1916)
- 9 Drayton Street (1853)
- Citizens Bank Building, 15 Drayton Street (1895) – now Propes Hall, part of SCAD

Northeastern trust/civic block

- Bank of America, 22 Bull Street (1907) – former Citizens and Southern Bank

Southeastern trust/civic block

- Christ Church, 28 Bull Street (1838/1897)

Southeastern residential/tything block

- The Manger Building, 7 East Congress Street (1913) – formerly Screven House and the Hotel Savannah

== Gallery ==
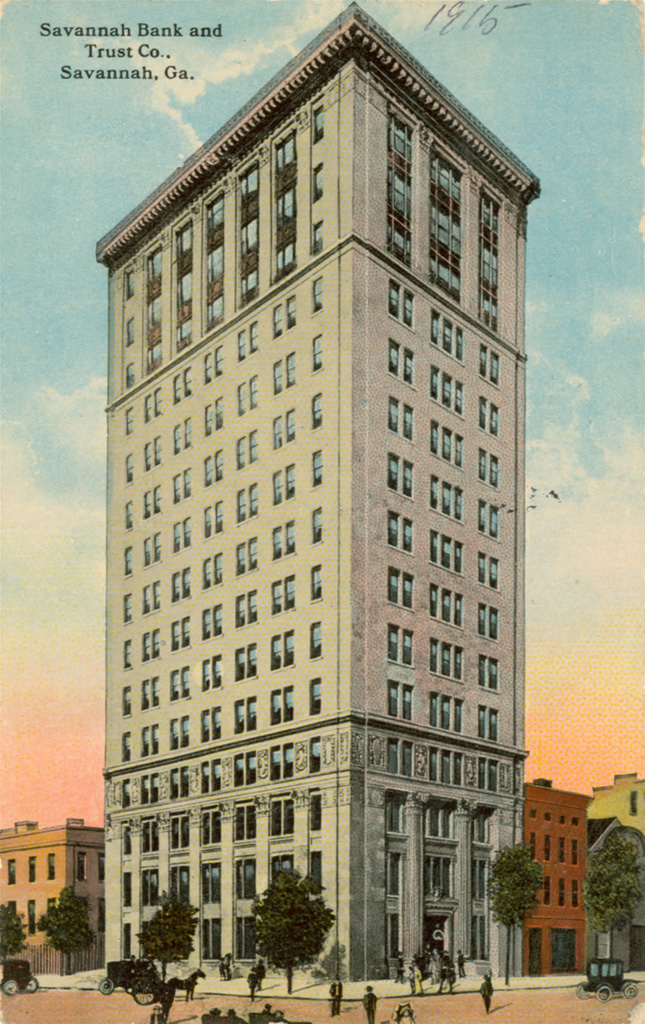
The former Savannah Bank and Trust Building, at 2 East Bryan Street

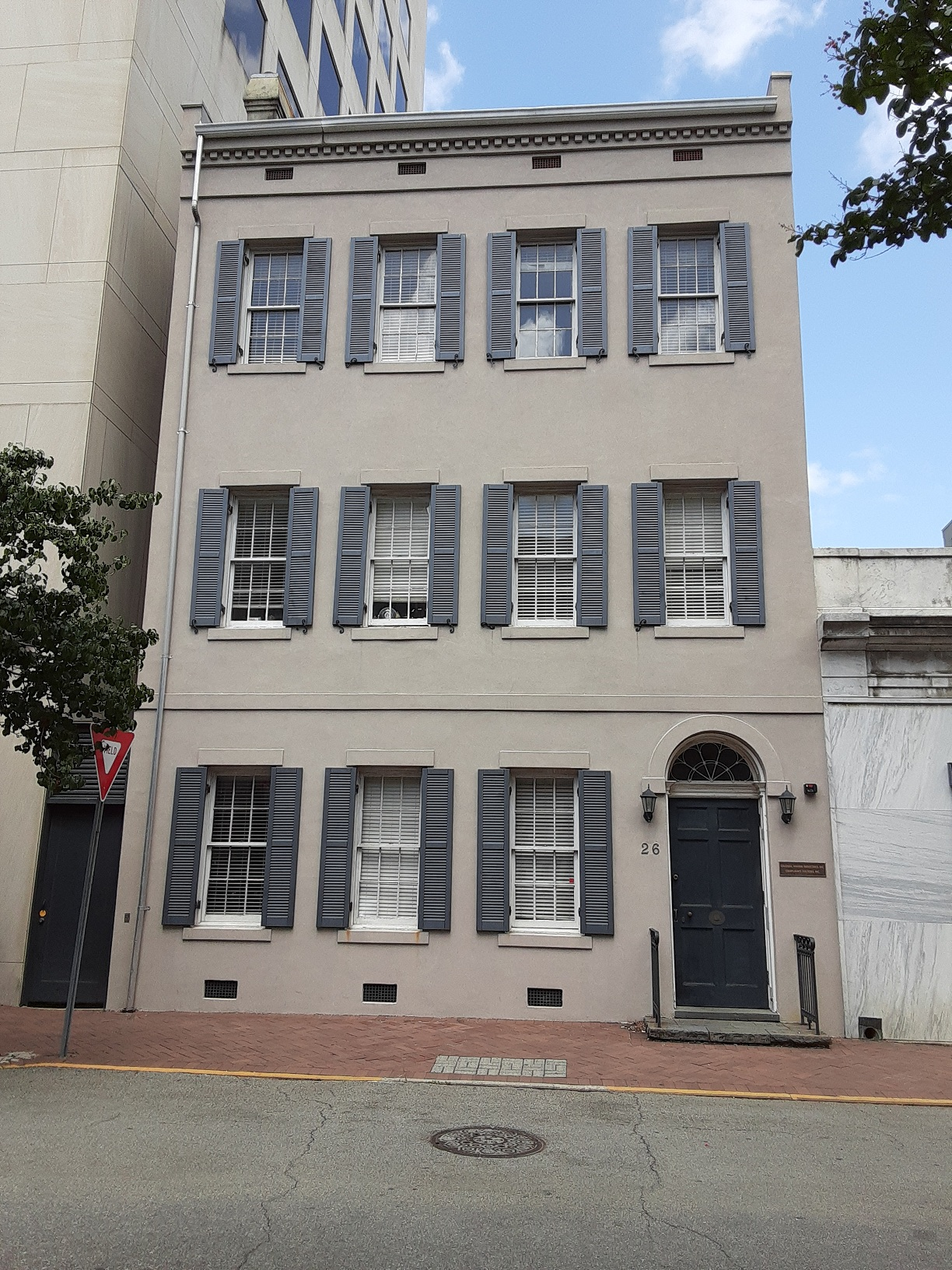
Ann Hamilton House, 24–26 East Bryan Street

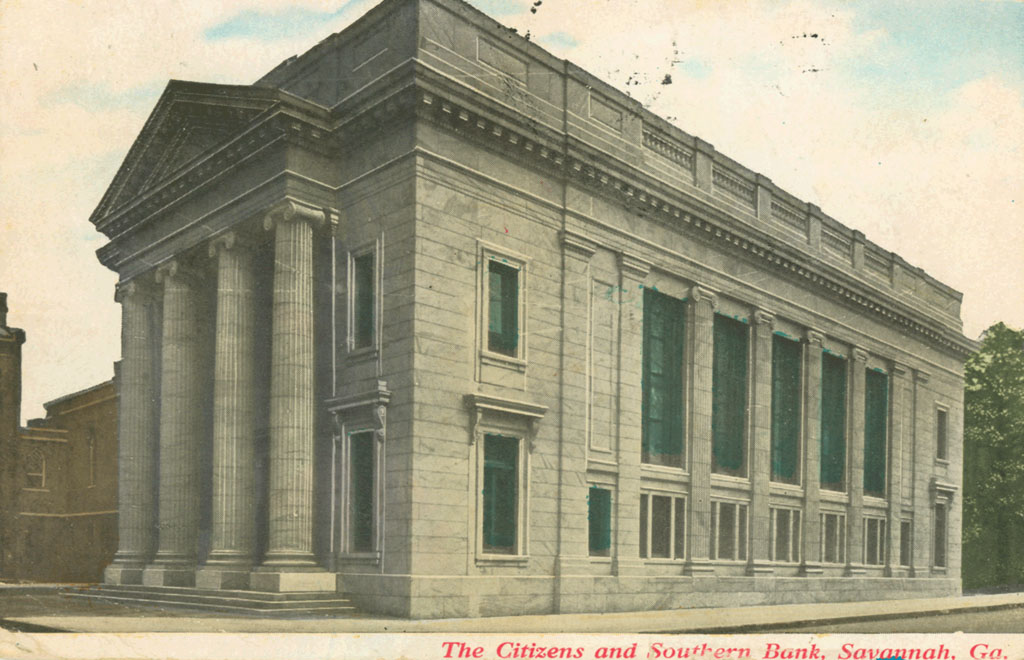
The Citizens and Southern Bank (now Bank of America), 22 Bull Street

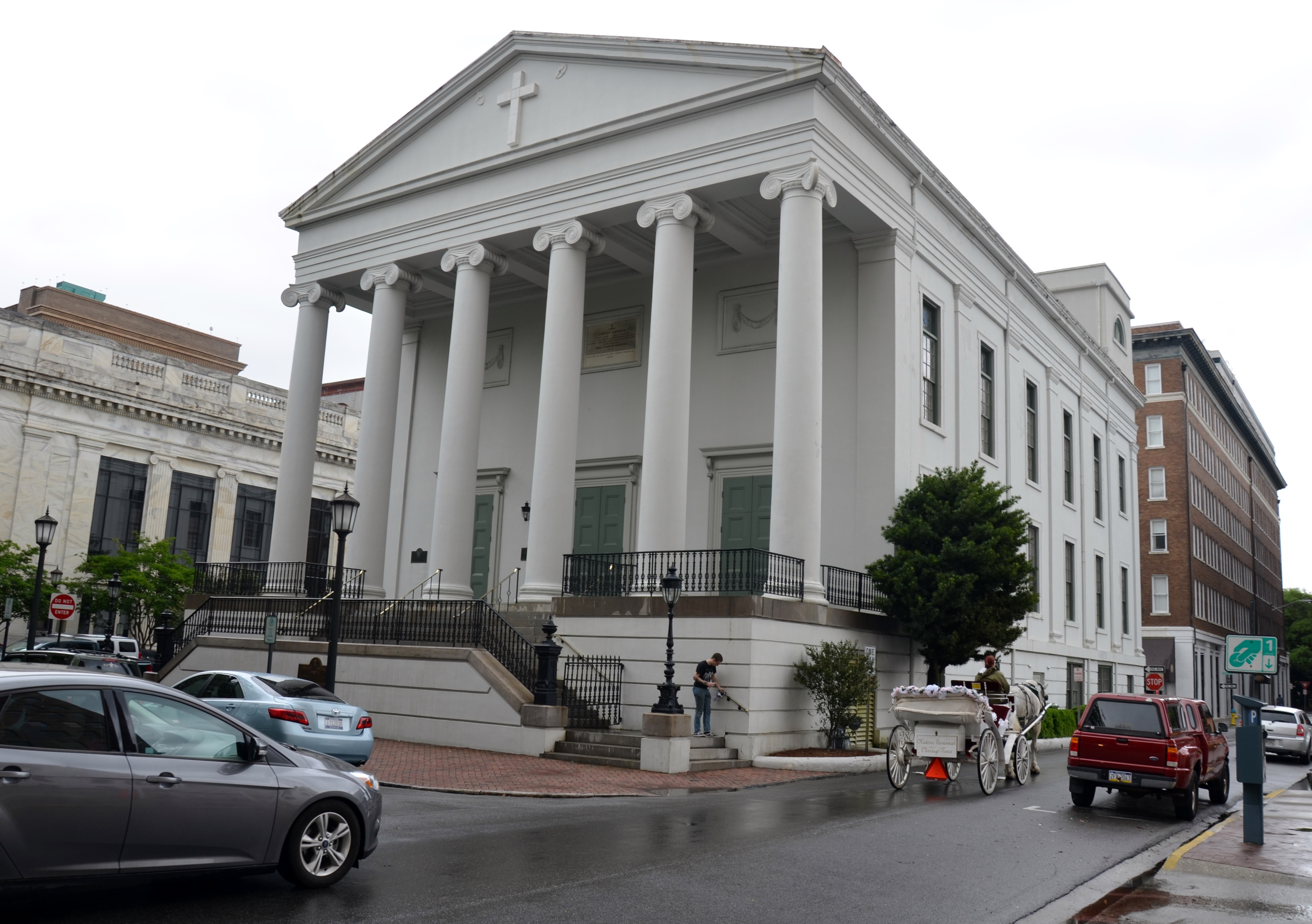
Christ Church Episcopal, 28 Bull Street

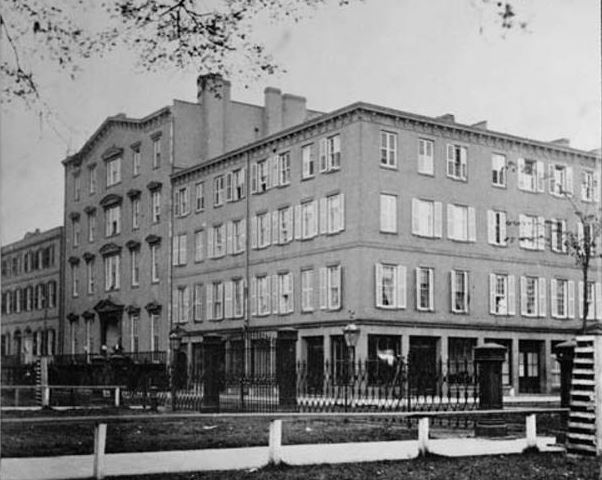
The Screven House Hotel, which formerly stood at the corner of Bull and Congress Streets

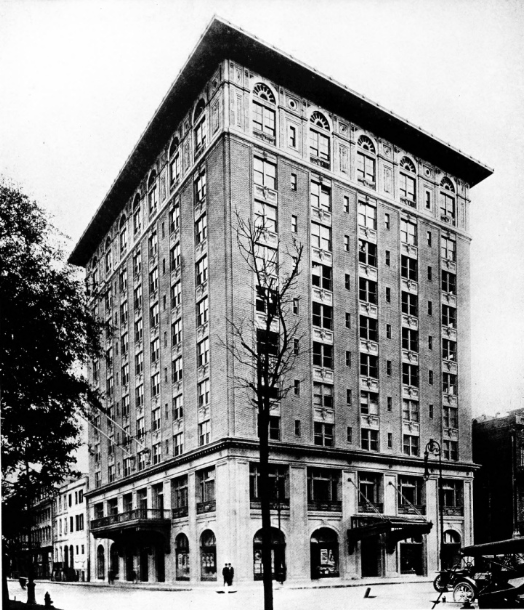
Screven House Hotel was replaced by the Savannah Hotel, then the Manger Building, at 7 East Congress Street

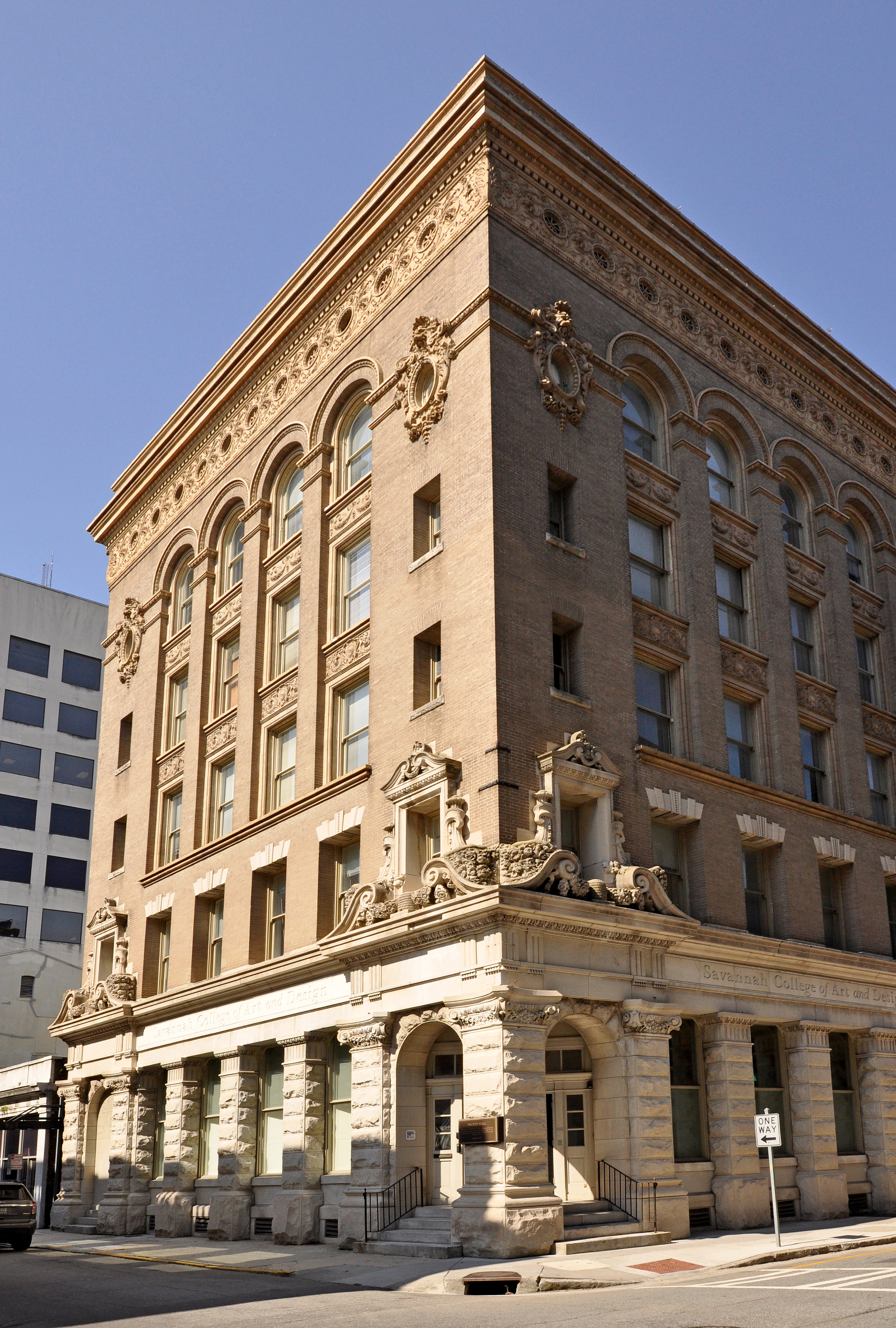
SCAD's Propes Hall, at 15 Drayton Street in the northeastern tything block

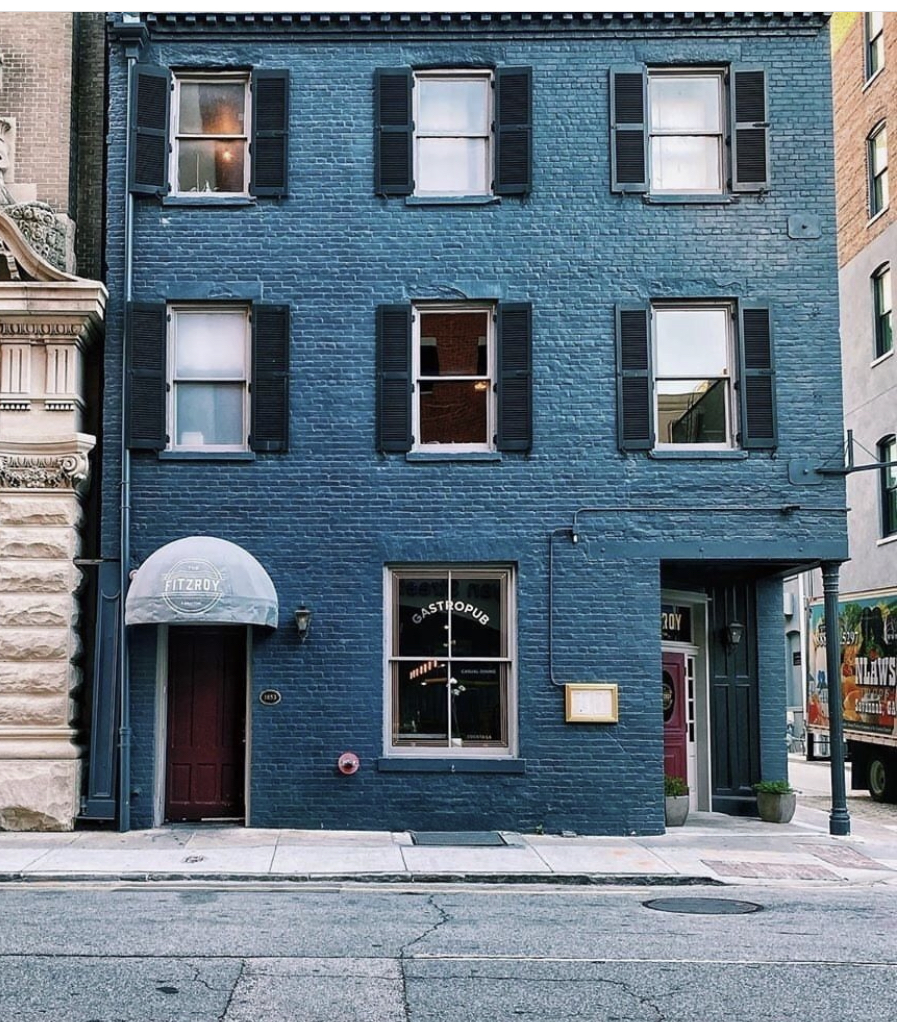
9 Drayton Street

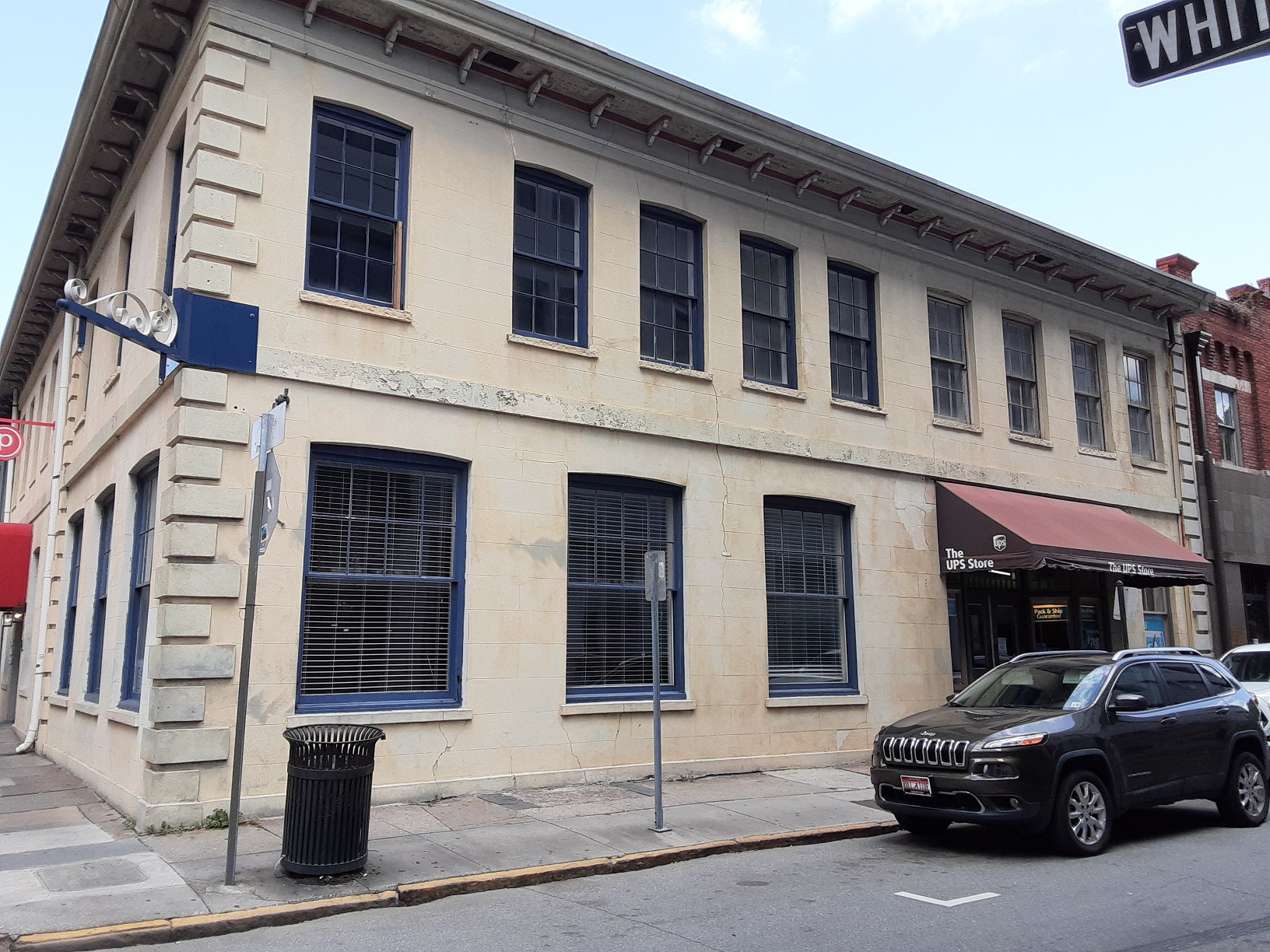
John L. Hardee Property, 22–24 East Bryan Street
