= Ann Hamilton House =

Historic house in Savannah, Georgia

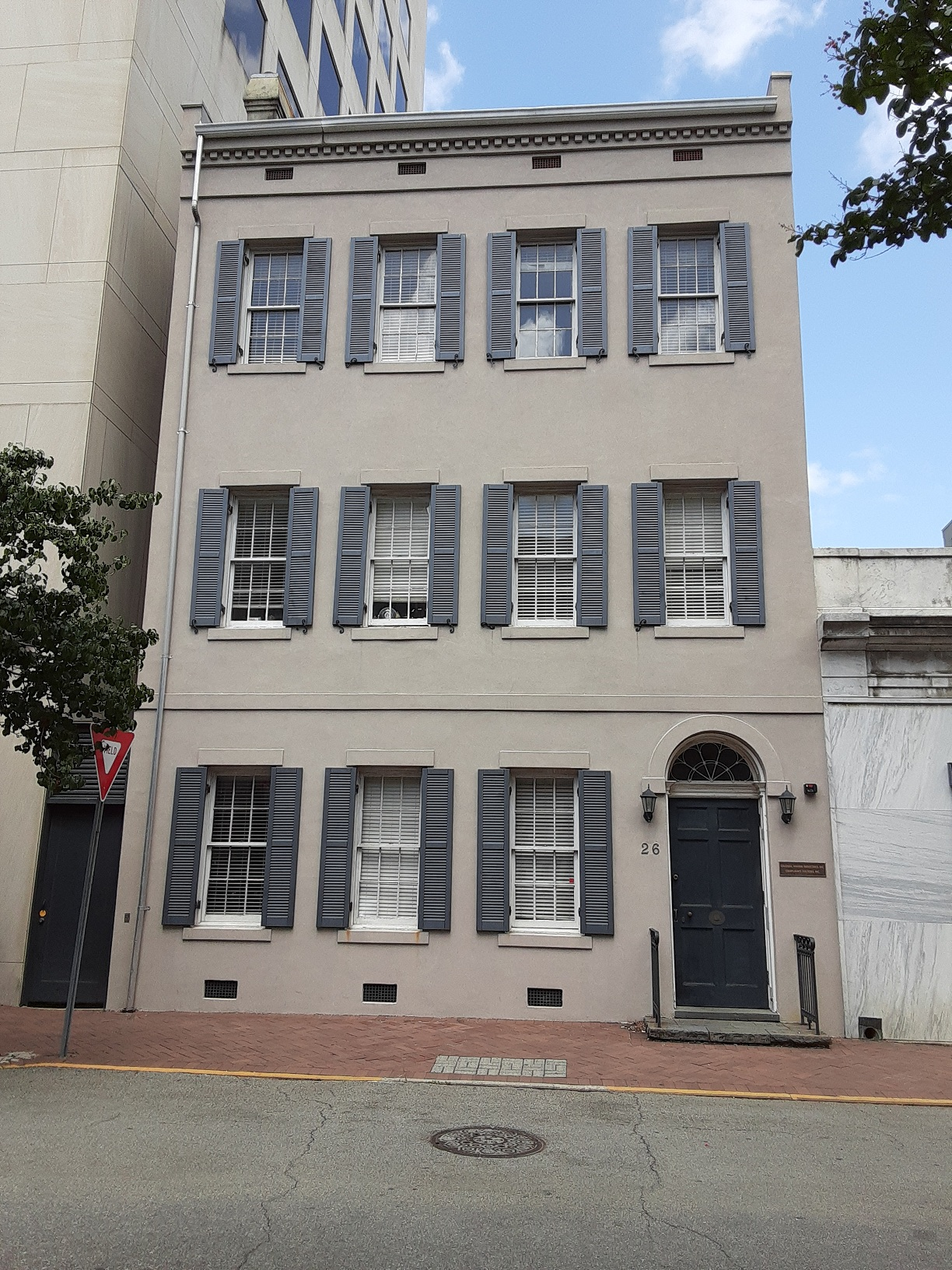
- The building in 2021
- Interactive map of the Ann Hamilton House area

General information
- Location: Savannah, Georgia, U.S., 24–26 East Bryan Street
- Coordinates: 32.08016242°N 81.0908043°W
- Completed: 1824 (202 years ago)

Technical details
- Floor count: 3

The Ann Hamilton House is a historic home in Savannah, Georgia, United States. It is located at 24–26 East Bryan Street in the northeastern tything block of Johnson Square, the city's oldest square. Completed in 1824, it is now the oldest extant building on the square. It is part of the Savannah Historic District.

The home was built by Amos Scudder for Ann Hamilton.

== See also ==
- Buildings in Savannah Historic District
