= Henry Cleenewerck =

Belgian painter (1825–1901)

- Born: 1825; Watou, Belgrium
- Died: 1901 (aged 75–76); Brussels, Belgium
- Known for: Painting

Henry W. Cleenewerck (1825–1901) was a Belgian-American artist in the 20th and 21st centuries. His work, especially from his time in Cuba, was highly acclaimed.

== Early life ==
Cleenewerck was born in 1825 in Watou, Belgium, to French parents. He attended the academies in Poperinge and Ypres.

== Career ==
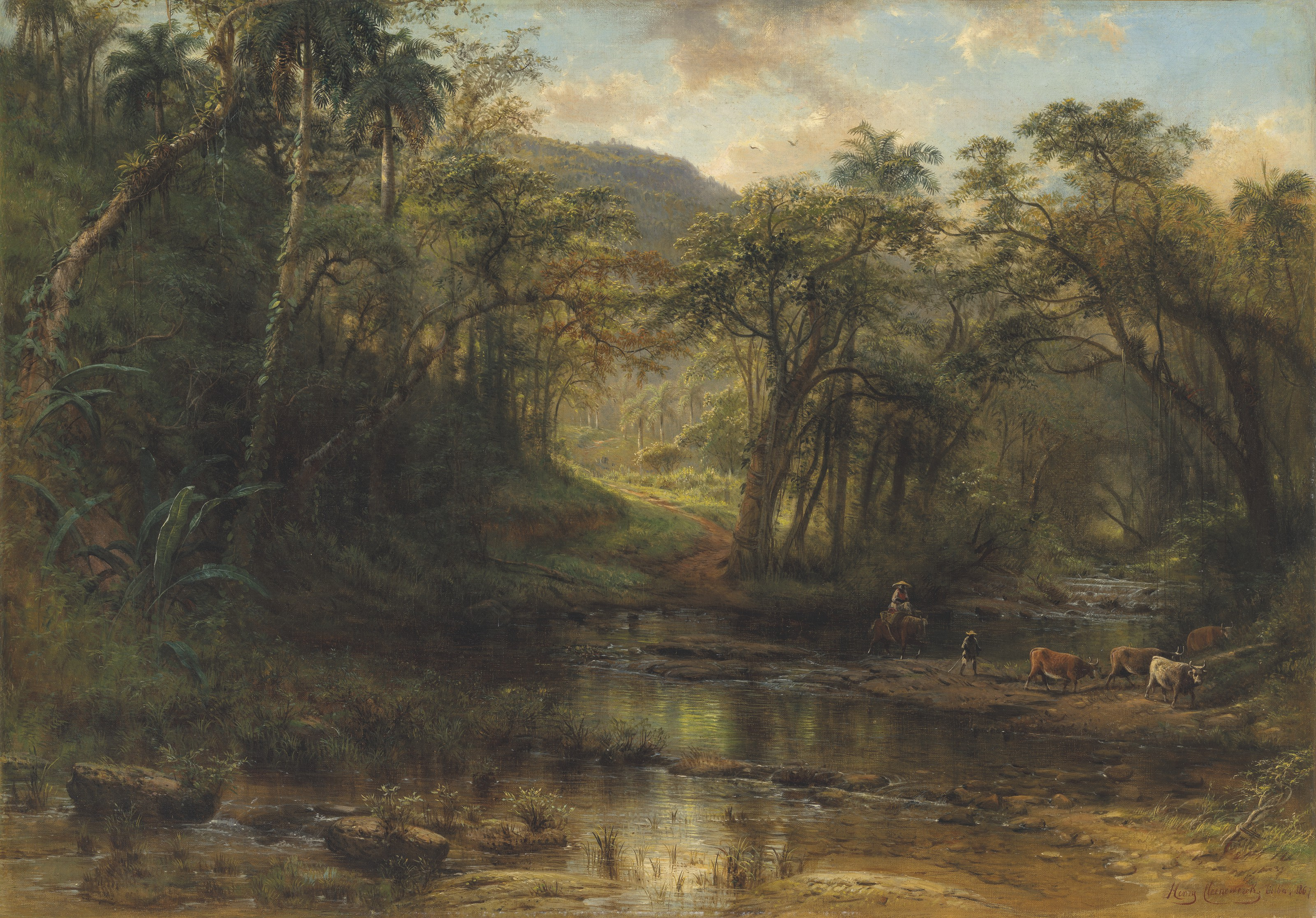
Cleenewerck's A Cuban landscape with drovers and cattle fording a stream (1867)

He visited the United States for the first time in 1854, beginning in California. He was working in Savannah, Georgia, by 1860. He exhibited his 1860 work, Bonaventure Cemetery, at Savannah's Armory Hall to high acclaim. It is now in the possession of Telfair Museums.

In 1863, Cleenewerck was living in Havana, Cuba, painting views of the Canimar River and San Antonio de los Banos, before leaving at the outbreak of the Ten Years' War in 1868. He moved to Paris, France, where he remained until 1873. He was living in San Francisco, California, in 1879, and visited the Monterey Peninsula in the early 1880s. He was a naturalised U.S. citizen at this point.

== Death ==
Cleenewerck died in Brussels, Belgium, in 1901.
