= Derby (surname) =

Derby is a surname. Notable people with the surname include:

- Alfred Thomas Derby (1821–1873) English painter, son of William Derby
- Brown Derby (actor) (1914-2000), Scottish actor
- Dean Derby (1935–2021), American retired National Football League player
- Ethel Roosevelt Derby (1891-1977), youngest daughter of President Theodore Roosevelt, instrumental in preserving his legacy
- Elias Hasket Derby (1739-1799), American merchant
- Fred Derby (1940-2001), Surinamese politician and trade unionist
- George Derby (1823-1861), American humorist
- George Derby (baseball) (1857-1925), American Major League Baseball pitcher
- James Cephas Derby (1818-1892), American book publisher
- Orville Adalbert Derby (1851-1915), American geologist who worked in Brazil
- Pat Derby (1942–2013), British-born American animal trainer
- Sylvester Derby (1892–1974), American college football head coach
- William Derby (1786–1847) English portraitist, miniature painter and copyist, father of Alfred Thomas Derby

== See also ==
- John de Derby, Archdeacon of Barnstaple and Dean of Lichfield from 1355 to 1358
- Alchmund of Derby (d. c. 800), Anglo-Saxon saint
- Derby (disambiguation)
