= Derby City =

Derby City may refer to:

- Derby City RLFC, an English rugby league team
- Louisville, Kentucky, nicknamed "Derby City" because it hosts the Kentucky Derby

== See also ==
- Derby, a city in England
- Derby (disambiguation)
