= Henry Room =

English painter

Henry Room (1802–1850) was an English portrait-painter, from an evangelical background in Birmingham.

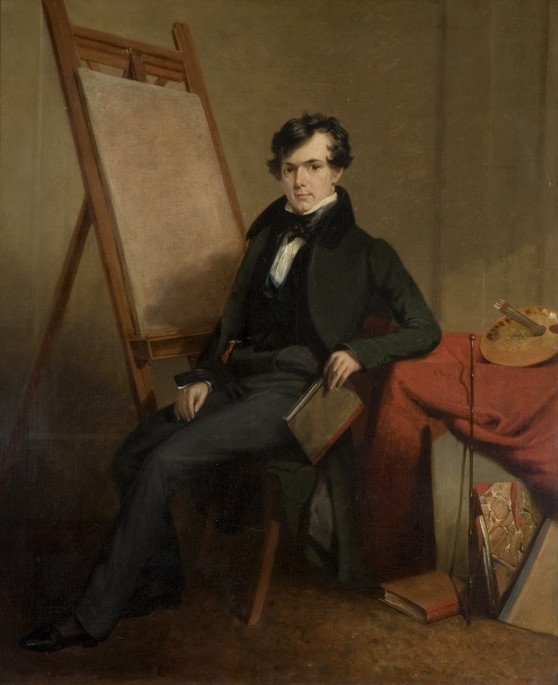
Henry Room, self-portrait

== Life ==
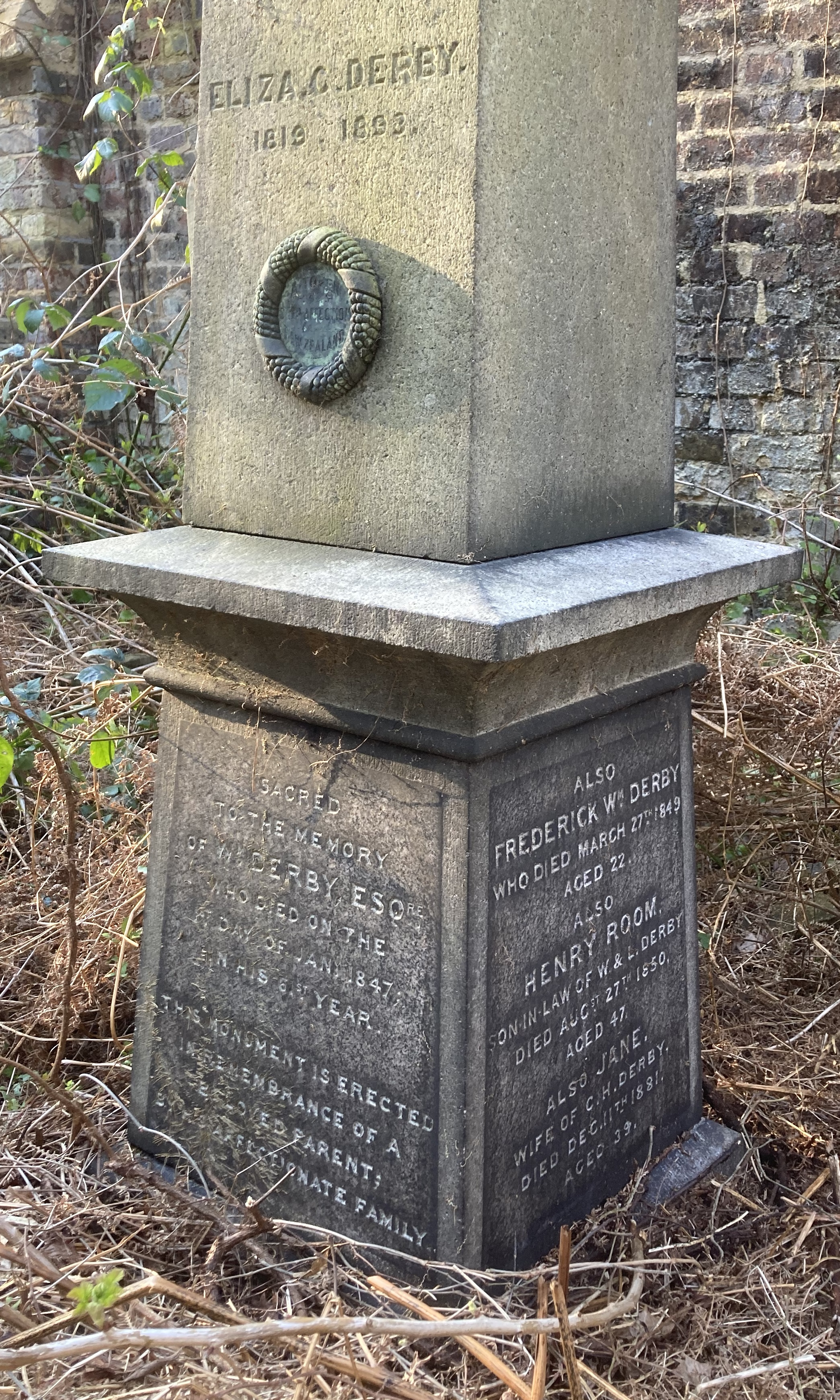
Grave of Henry Room in Highgate Cemetery

Henry Room was born in Newhall Street, the son of John Room, a japanner, and studied at Joseph Barber's drawing school on Great Charles Street. An original member of the Royal Birmingham Society of Artists, he was also one of the group of artists that broke away from the Society in 1828 to exhibit at a rival institution in Temple Row. Room was in London in the late 1820s, sharing a studio with Peter Hollins in Old Bond Street. He was a deacon in the church of John Morison. He was a frequent exhibitor at the Royal Academy from 1826 onwards and completed many portraits of missionaries, academics and reformers which were engraved by John Cochran. Room maintained close links with Birmingham and was appointed as auditor for the newly formed Birmingham Society of Artists in 1842.

He married a daughter of the portraitist, miniature painter and copyist, William Derby and was therefore a brother-in-law of Alfred Thomas Derby.

He died in London on 27 August 1850, aged 48, and was buried in the Derby family grave in Highgate Cemetery.

== Works ==
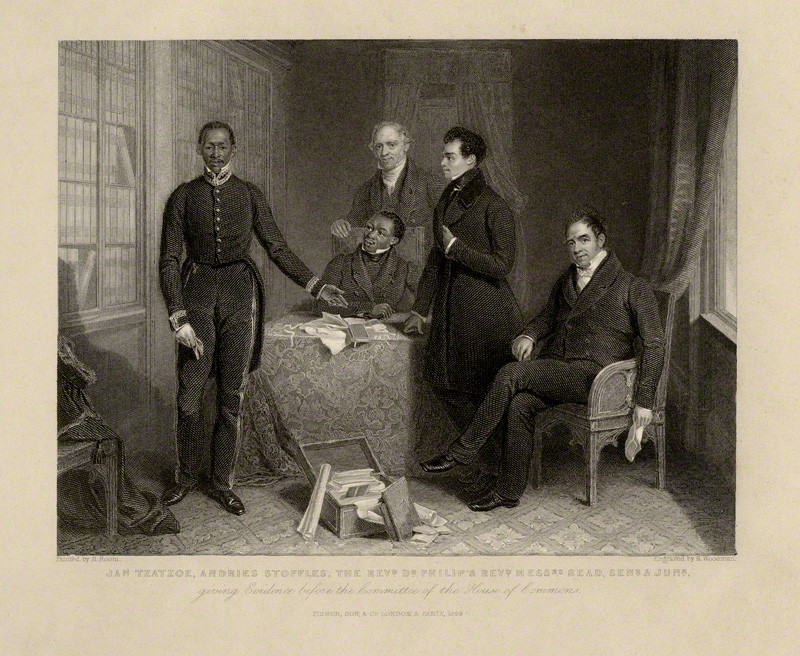
Engraving (1844) of the 1835 Parliamentary delegation from South Africa, led by John Philip by Richard Woodman after Henry Room

He had a reputation as a painter of portraits, and received commissions, some of his portraits being engraved. He first exhibited at the Royal Academy in 1826. He practised for some time at Birmingham. He painted a portrait of Thomas Clarkson for the Central Negro Emancipation Committee, and also two groups of the Interview of Queen Adelaide with the Madagascar Princes at Windsor, and The Caffre Chiefs' Examination before the House of Commons Committee. Many of his portraits were executed for the Evangelical Magazine. He painted a series of medical men for Thomas Joseph Pettigrew's Biographical Memoirs (1839).
