= Derby (disambiguation) =

Derby is a city in Derbyshire, England.

Derby or The Derby may also refer to:

== Places ==
=== Australia ===
- Derby, Tasmania, a town
- Derby, Western Australia, a town
- Derby Highway, Western Australia

=== Canada ===
- Derby, British Columbia, a locality
- Derby Parish, New Brunswick
  - Derby, New Brunswick, an unincorporated community therein
- Mount Derby, British Columbia

=== South Africa ===
- Derby, North West, a town

=== United Kingdom ===
- Derby (UK Parliament constituency), Derbyshire
- Derby (ward), a Metropolitan Borough of Sefton ward, Merseyside
- Diocese of Derby, a Church of England diocese

=== United States ===
- Derby, Colorado, a census-designated place
- Derby, Connecticut, a city
- Derby, Ford County, Illinois, an unincorporated community
- Derby, Saline County, Illinois, an unincorporated community
- Derby, Indiana, an unincorporated community
- Derby, Iowa, a city
- Derby, Kansas, a city
- Derby, New York, a hamlet
- Darby Township, Pickaway County, Ohio
  - Derby, Ohio, a census-designated place
- Derby, Texas, an unincorporated community
- Derby, Vermont, a town
- Derby, Wise County, Virginia, an unincorporated community and coal town
- Derby Dam, Truckee River, Nevada, United States

== People ==
- Derby (surname)
- Derby Carrillo (born 1987), Salvadoran footballer
- Derby Guerrier (born 1949), Haitian military officer
- Derby Makinka (1965–1993), Zambian footballer

== Sport ==
=== Clubs ===
- BK Derby, a Swedish association football club located in Linköping, Sweden
- Derby City RLFC, an English rugby league team based in Derby, Derbyshire
- Derby County F.C., an English football club
- Derby RFC, an English rugby union team based in Derby, Derbyshire
- Derby/Linköping BK, a Swedish bandy club located in Linköping, Sweden
- FC Derby, Cape Verde
- SC Derby, Montenegrin basketball club

=== Specific sports and events ===
- Derby (horse race), a race usually restricted to three-year-old horses
  - Epsom Derby, also known as the Derby Stakes, the most prestigious of Britain's horse races
  - Kentucky Derby, often referred to in the United States as simply "The Derby"
- Local derby, sports match (usually association football) between two rivals that are based in areas of close geographical proximity
- Demolition derby, an intentionally destructive motor sport
- Roller derby, a roller-skating contact sport
- Home Run Derby, an annual home run hitting competition by Major League Baseball

== Arts and entertainment ==
=== Films ===
- The Derby (1895 film), a British documentary film
- The Derby (1919 film), a German silent mystery sports film
- Derby (1926 film), a German silent film
- Derby (1949 film), a West German horse racing film directed by Roger von Norman and starring Hannelore Schroth
- Derby (1971 film), an American documentary film by Robert Kaylor about the world of 1970s professional roller derby

=== Music ===
- Derby mute, a horn mute that resembles a derby hat
- Derby Records, a short-lived American record label

== Brands and enterprises ==
- Derby (French car), a defunct French automobile marque
- Derby (cigarette), a brand name of cigarettes sold in Latin America, particularly Costa Rica
- Derby Cycle, a large German bicycle manufacturer
- Derby Oil Company, a former oil company purchased by the Coastal Corporation in 1988
- Volkswagen Derby, a car
- Derby (Canadian automobile), a Canadian automobile built in Saskatchewan between 1924 and 1927
- Derby (repair shops), railroad repair facilities in Milo, Maine
- The Derby, a swing-dance nightclub opened in 1992 at the former Los Feliz Brown Derby

== Clothing ==
- Derby, another name for a bowler hat
- Derby shoe, a style of shoe

== Food and drink ==
- Derby (cocktail), a drink with gin, peach bitters and mint leaves
- Derby cheese, a British cheese
- Derby pie, a chocolate and pecan tart with a pastry dough crust

== Military ==
- De Havilland DH.27 Derby, a 1920s biplane bomber that did not reach production
- HMS Derby, a First World War minesweeper
- Derby (missile), a version of the Israeli Python air-to-air missile

== Schools ==
- Derby Academy (disambiguation)
- Derby College, England
- Derby Grammar School, a Church of England secondary school
- Derby High School (disambiguation)
- Derby School, a school in Derby, England, from 1160 to 1989
- University of Derby, England

== Other uses ==
- Apache Derby, Java relational database management system
- Derby Porcelain, a type of English ceramic pottery
- Earl of Derby, a title in the peerage of England
- Derby Racer, two former roller coasters at Revere Beach, Massachusetts
- Derby toadlet, a species of frog

== See also ==
- Darby (disambiguation)
- Derbyshire
