= Darby =

Darby may refer to:

== Places ==
=== United States ===
- Darby, Idaho, an unincorporated community
- Darby, Montana, a town
- Darby, North Carolina, an unincorporated community
- Darby Township, Madison County, Ohio
- Darby Township, Pickaway County, Ohio
- Darby Township, Union County, Ohio
- Lake Darby, Ohio
- Darby, Pennsylvania, a borough
  - Darby station
- Darby Township, Delaware County, Pennsylvania
- Darby Creek (Pennsylvania), a tributary of the Delaware River

=== Other places ===
- Darby River, Victoria, Australia
- Darby Green, Yateley, North East Hampshire, England
- Camp Darby, U.S. military camp in Italy
- Darby Generating Station, a peaker plant in Pickaway County, Ohio

== Other uses ==
- Darby (name), a given name and surname, including a list of people and fictional characters, as well as those named D'Arby
- Hurricane Darby (disambiguation)
- USS Darby (DE-218), a US Navy destroyer escort
- Darby, New Hampshire, a fictional town in a series of novels by Ernest Hebert
- Darby Bible, a 1890 translation of the Holy Bible
- Darbies, or Darby handcuffs, the most common type of Victorian handcuffs
- Darby FC, a Canadian soccer club
- DARBY (magazine), a Canadian soccer magazine

== See also ==
- Darby and Joan, a British expression for a happily married couple
- Darby Pop Publishing, an American comic book publishing company
- Derby (disambiguation)
