= USS Darby =

Buckley-class destroyer escort

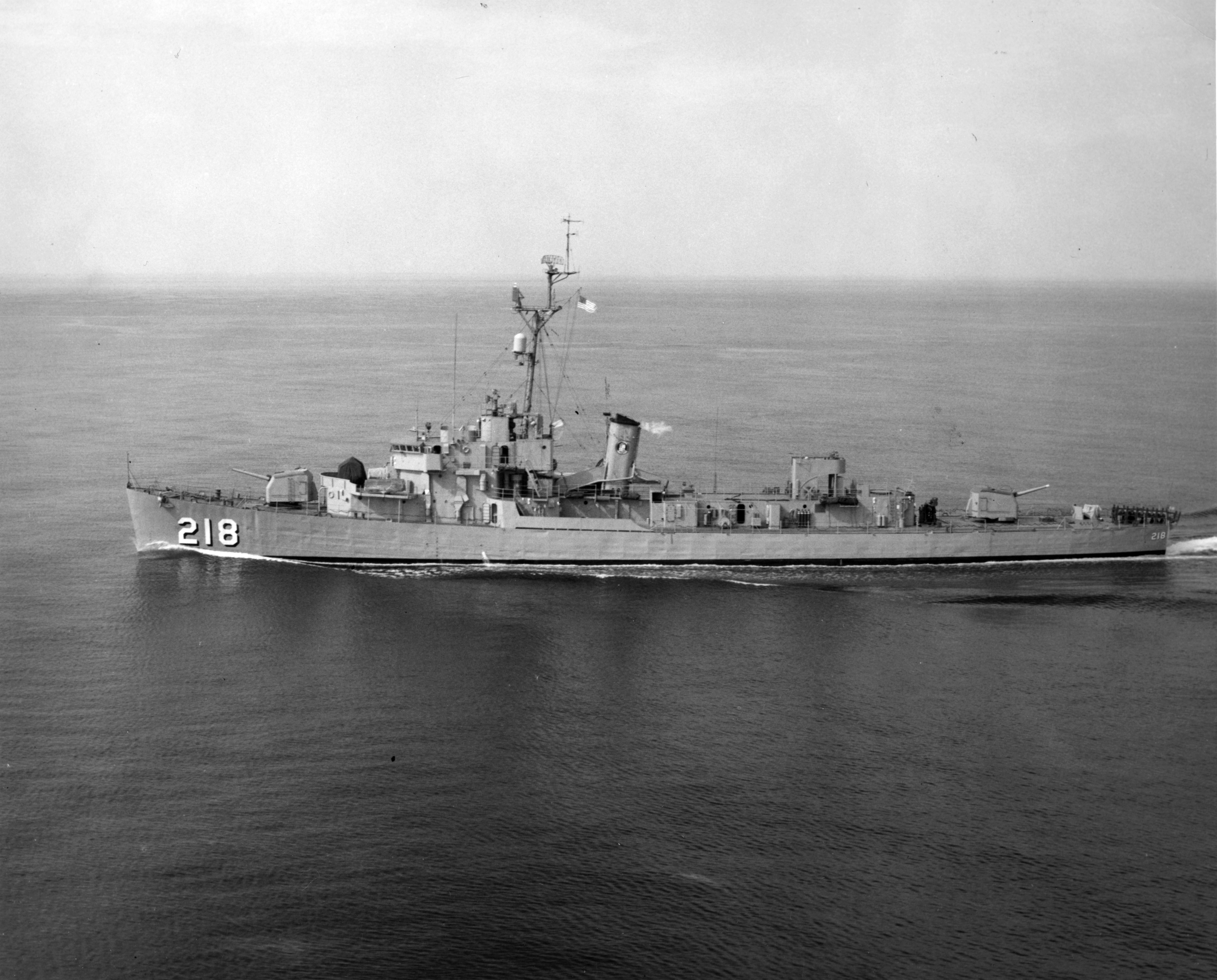
- Darby off Hampton Roads in 1965

History

United States
- Name: Darby
- Namesake: Marshall E. Darby
- Ordered: 1942
- Builder: Philadelphia Navy Yard, Philadelphia, Pennsylvania
- Laid down: 22 February 1943
- Launched: 29 May 1943
- Commissioned: 15 November 1943
- Decommissioned: 28 April 1947
- Recommissioned: 24 October 1950
- Decommissioned: 23 September 1968
- Stricken: 23 September 1968
- Honors and awards: 2 battle stars (World War II)
- Fate: Sunk as a target, 24 May 1970

General characteristics
- Class & type: Buckley-class destroyer escort
- Displacement: 1,400 long tons (1,422 t) standard; 1,740 long tons (1,768 t) full load
- Length: 306 ft (93 m)
- Beam: 37 ft (11 m)
- Draft: 9 ft 6 in (2.90 m) standard; 11 ft 3 in (3.43 m) full load
- Propulsion: 2 × boilers; General Electric turbo-electric drive; 12,000 shp (8.9 MW); 2 × solid manganese-bronze 3,600 lb (1,600 kg) 3-bladed propellers, 8 ft 6 in (2.59 m) diameter, 7 ft 7 in (2.31 m) pitch; 2 × rudders; 359 tons fuel oil
- Speed: 23 knots (43 km/h; 26 mph)
- Range: 3,700 nmi (6,900 km) at 15 kn (28 km/h; 17 mph); 6,000 nmi (11,000 km) at 12 kn (22 km/h; 14 mph)
- Complement: 15 officers, 198 men
- Armament: 3 × 3"/50 caliber guns; 1 × quad 1.1"/75 caliber gun; 8 × single 20 mm guns; 1 × triple 21 inch (533 mm) torpedo tubes; 1 × Hedgehog anti-submarine mortar; 8 × K-gun depth charge projectors; 2 × depth charge tracks

USS Darby (DE-218) was a Buckley-class destroyer escort in service with the United States Navy from 1943 to 1947 and from 1950 to 1968. She was sunk as a target in 1970.

== History ==
Darby was named in honor of Ensign Marshall E. Darby (1918–1941), who fell overboard, while serving aboard the battleship USS Oklahoma, during the Japanese attack on Pearl Harbor on 7 December 1941. The ship was launched 29 May 1943 by Philadelphia Navy Yard, sponsored by Mrs. M. E. Darby, and commissioned 15 November 1943.

=== 1944–1947 ===
Clearing Philadelphia on 19 January 1944, Darby sailed on escort duty to Bora Bora, Society Islands, and Espiritu Santo, New Hebrides, and arrived at Guadalcanal on 20 March. She operated with Task Force 31 in the Solomons until 23 July, among other duties screening the landings on Emirau Island on 10 April. From 23 July, she escorted convoys among the islands of Guadalcanal, Eniwetok, New Hebrides, Manus, and Majuro. After a brief overhaul at Pearl Harbor from 8 to 24 October, she served on convoy duty between Guam and Eniwetok until mid-November. On 15 November, she conducted a hunter-killer patrol off Ponape, then fired a shore bombardment on Tanga Islands before returning to Eniwetok. Three days later, she sailed by way of Kwajalein, Guadalcanal, and Manus for exercises in Milne Bay, New Guinea from 7 to 26 December in preparation for the Lingayen assault.

Darby sortied from Manus on 2 January 1945 screening transports to Lingayen Gulf, Luzon, to reinforce the troops there. Arriving 11 January, she remained in the Philippines on escort and patrol duties until 28 February when she cleared for Ulithi to join a convoy carrying garrison troops for Iwo Jima. She arrived off the island 18 March, remaining there on patrol until 27 March when she sailed to escort transports to Eniwetok. She continued on to Pearl Harbor, arriving 12 April for repairs.

Darby was training in the Hawaiian area when the war ended and on 29 August 1945 got underway for San Francisco, carrying servicemen eligible for discharge. After an overhaul she sailed for the east coast, arriving at New York on 15 December and at New London, Connecticut on 8 January 1946. She sailed out of New London for training and exercises until 16 January 1947 when she cleared for Charleston, South Carolina. Darby was placed out of commission in reserve there on 28 April 1947.

=== 1950–1962 ===
Recommissioned on 24 October 1950, Darby became flagship for the newly commissioned Escort Squadron 8 on 14 May 1951, with Norfolk, Virginia her home port. On 19 June, she entered Newport News Shipyard to have advanced anti-submarine weapons installed, then began intensive training and joined in exercises in the Caribbean and Atlantic. She served as school ship for the Fleet Sonar School at Key West, from 4 April to 12 July 1952, and between 26 August and 11 October sailed in NATO exercise "Operation Mainbrace", visiting the Firth of Forth and Rosyth, Scotland, and Kristiansand, Norway.

Darby alternated school ship duty at Key West with training in the Virginia Capes area and took part in a midshipmen cruise in the summer of 1954, visiting Dublin, Ireland, and Portsmouth, England. Between 28 January and 25 April 1958, she called at Trinidad and Rio de Janeiro while on a cruise to survey Ascension Island in connection with missile tracking operations in the South Atlantic.

On 23 February 1959, Darby was placed in service in reserve for use in the training of the Naval Reserve out of Baltimore. These training cruises took her along the east coast and to Puerto Rico, and this duty continued through 1962. On Saturday, 19 March 1960 at around 8 pm, the Darby collided with a Swedish merchant ship, the Soya-Atlantic, in the mouth of the Chesapeake Bay. Thirteen Naval Reservists were injured and two died in the accident.

== Awards ==
Darby received two battle stars for World War II service.
