= Derby Academy =

Derby Academy may refer to:

- Derby Academy (Hingham), an elementary and middle school in Hingham, Massachusetts, United States
- Derby Academy (School of Dance), a dance school in Derby, Derbyshire, England
- City of Derby Academy, a secondary school in Derby, Derbyshire, England

== See also ==
- Derby (disambiguation)
