= Invasion of Lingayen Gulf =

1945 Allied operation in the Philippines during World War II

- Part of the Philippines campaign of the Pacific War
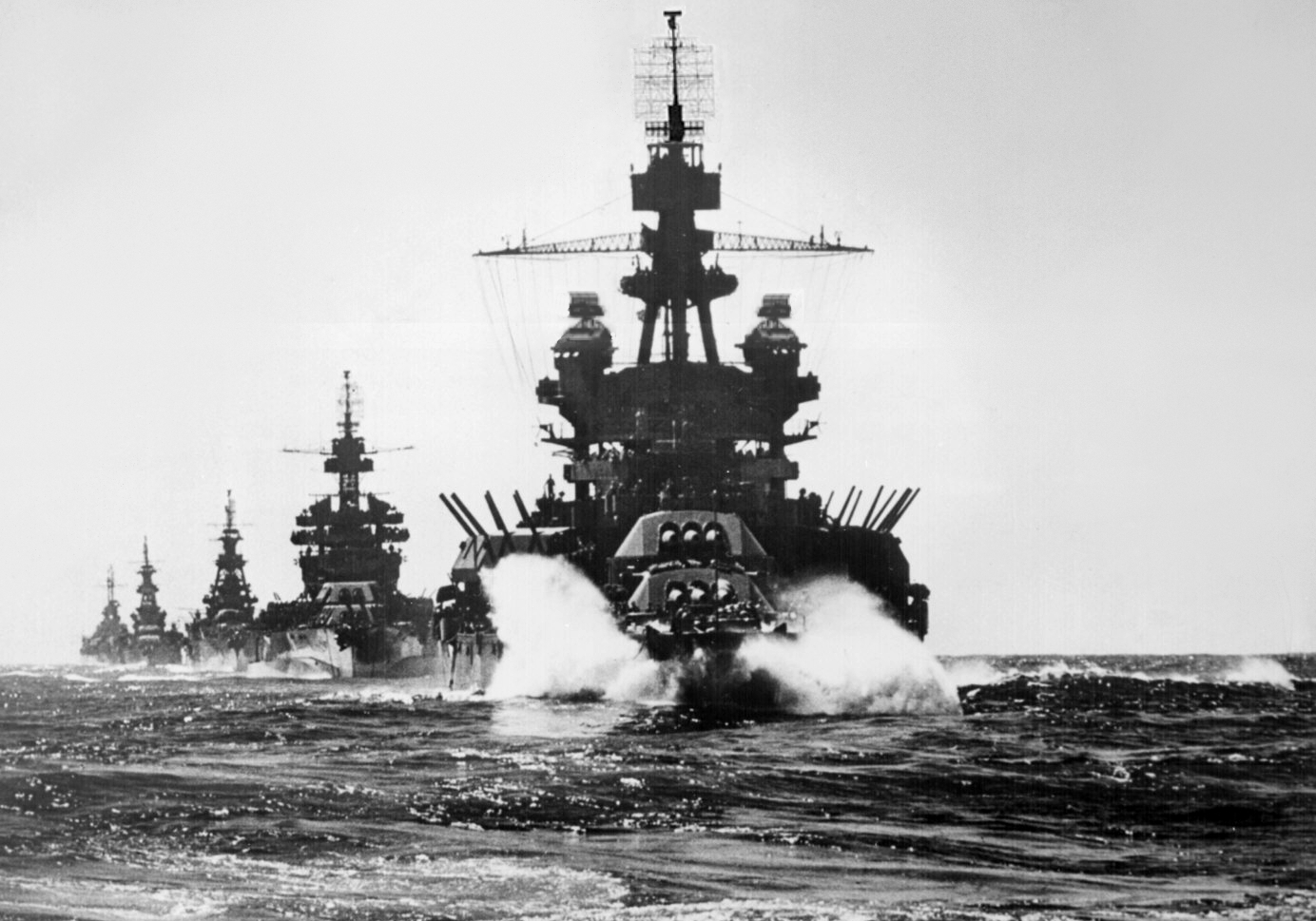
- The U.S. Navy battleship USS Pennsylvania leading the battleship USS Colorado and the heavy cruiser USS Louisville to the shores of Lingayen.
| Date | Naval invasion, 3–13 January 1945 (1 week and 3 days) |
| Location | Lingayen Gulf, Luzon, Philippines |
| Result | Allied victory |

Belligerents
| United States: Commonwealth of the Philippines; Australia | Japan: Second Philippine Republic |

Commanders and leaders
| (United States) Jesse B. Oldendorf (United States) Douglas MacArthur (United States) Walter Krueger | (Empire of Japan) Tomoyuki Yamashita |

Strength
| (United States) 875 + warships 203,608 soldiers (Australia) : 1 heavy cruiser | (Empire of Japan) Roughly 450–600 aircraft, 200 used as kamikazes 262,000 troops on Luzon |

Casualties and losses
| United States; 24 ships sunk 67 ships damaged (Entire Luzon campaign and Mindoro Is.) (13 Dec 1944 – 13 Jan 1945) 8,000 dead 29,560 wounded (Entire Luzon campaign) | Japan; Roughly 450–600 aircraft lost 1 destroyer sunk, 2 damaged Lingayen Invasion 217,000 dead, 9,050 taken prisoner (Entire Luzon campaign) |

The Invasion of Lingayen Gulf (Pangasinan: Inlusob ed Golfo na Lingayen; Ilocano: Iraraut iti Golfo ti Lingayen; Tagalog: Paglusob sa Golfo ng Lingayen; Spanish: Invasión del Golfo de Lingayén), 3–13 January 1945, was an Allied amphibious operation in the Philippines during World War II. In the early morning of 6 January 1945, a large Allied force commanded by Admiral Jesse B. Oldendorf began approaching the shores of Lingayen from Lingayen Gulf, on the island of Luzon. U.S. Navy and Royal Australian Navy warships began bombarding suspected Japanese positions along the coast of Lingayen from their position in Lingayen Gulf for three days. On "S-Day", 9 January, the U.S. 6th Army landed on a roughly 25 mi (40 km) beachhead at the base of the Gulf between the towns of Lingayen and San Fabian.

== Background ==
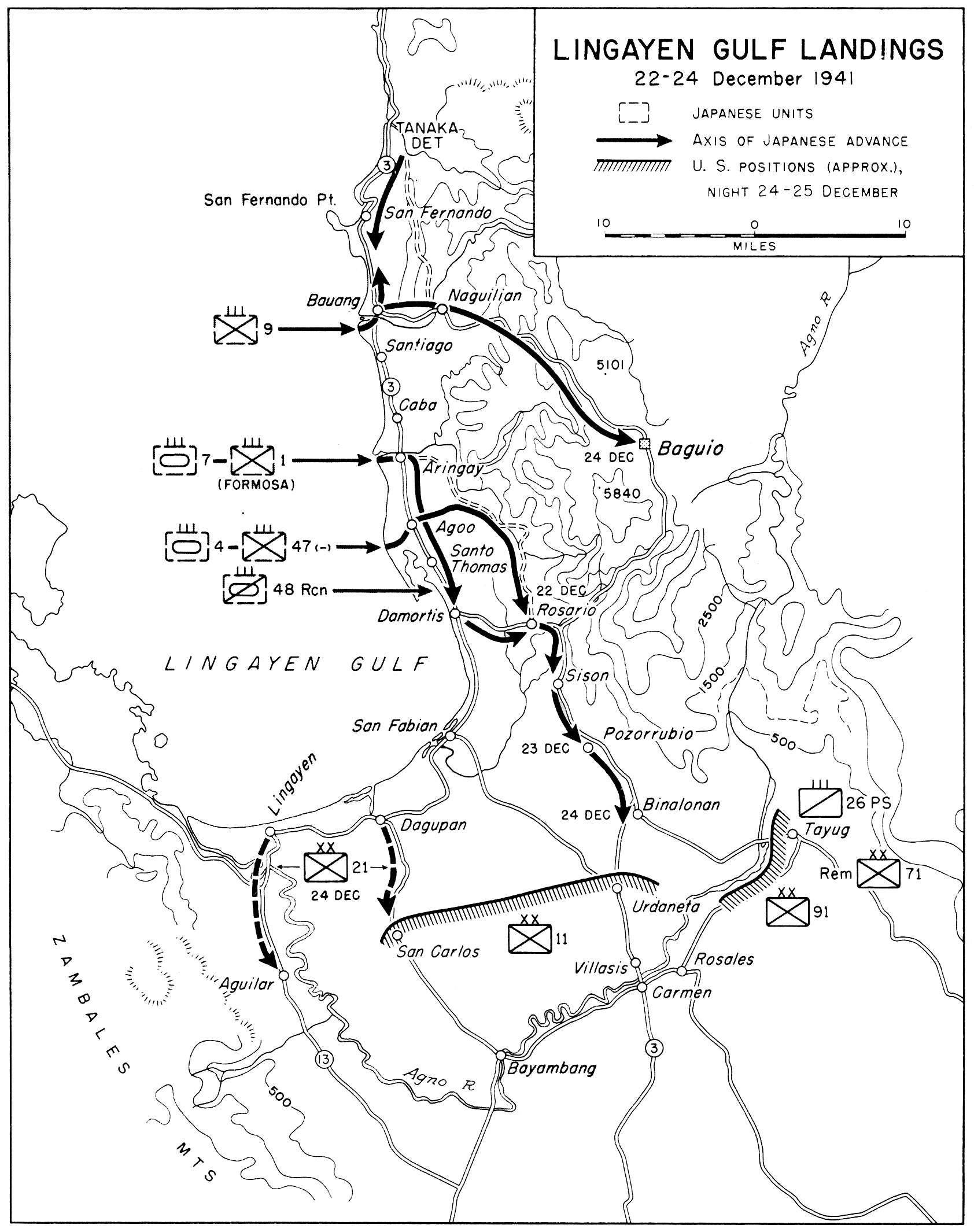
Japanese landings on Lingayen Gulf, 22 December 1941

During World War II, Lingayen Gulf proved a strategically important theater of war between American and Japanese forces. Shown in the center of the figure left, on 22 December 1941, the Japanese 14th Army—under Lieutenant General Masaharu Homma—landed on the northeastern shores of the gulf, at Agoo, Caba, Santiago and Bauang, where they engaged in a number of relatively minor skirmishes with the defenders, a poorly equipped contingent of predominantly American and Filipino troops. Facing limited opposition, the larger Japanese forces managed to successfully invade and occupy the gulf.

On the day after the defeat, General Douglas MacArthur issued the order to retreat from Luzon and withdraw to Bataan. Following their defeat at the Battle of Bataan, U.S. and Filipino prisoners of war were forced into the Bataan Death March, with their destination Capas, Tarlac, not far from the capital city of Manila.

After attempting to establish an independent Allied government supported by American troops under the command of General McArthur on Corregidor, Japanese troops forced the surrender of the remaining American and Filipino forces there at the Battle of Corregidor on 6 May 1942. On 11 March 1942, Lieutenant John D. Bulkeley had picked up MacArthur, his family, and his immediate staff, who had been ordered to flee the Philippines. For the next three years, the gulf remained under Japanese occupation prior to the Lingayen Gulf landings.

== Operations, ==
=== Bombardment ===
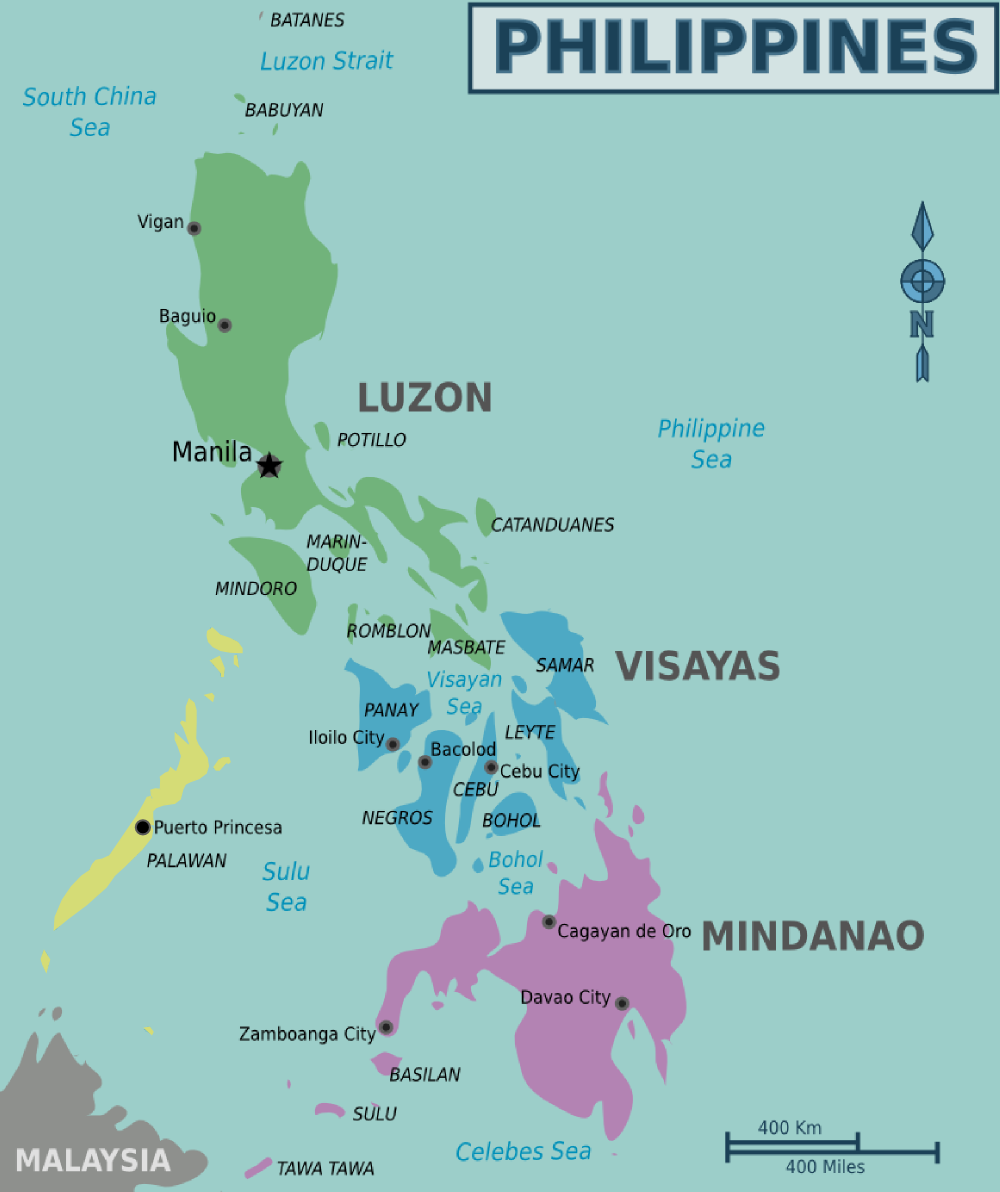
Islands of the Philippines

From 3–9 January 1945, the ships of Admiral Oldendorf's invasion force took a lengthy circuitous route through the previously captured islands of Leyte Gulf in the Southeast of the Philippines, shown in blue as the Eastern Visayas in the map at left, and West, South of the Southern Visayas through the Suriago Strait and the Bohol Sea. Then heading north and following the Western coastlines of the Western Philippine Islands of Negros, Panay, and Mindoro (In green), shown at left in the map, the forward staged ships of Admiral Oldendorf's naval invasion force headed for the mouth of Lingayen Gulf on the Island of Luzon, shown to the immediate left of Bagaio. From the mouth of the Gulf, two vertical channels would be swept of mines by the minesweepers, one for landing areas terminating at the base of the Gulf, west on the beach of Lingayen, and one for landing areas terminating east at the town of San Fabian. The narrow base of the roughly rectangular Lingayen Gulf provided a relatively small landing area, only 25–30 miles wide, but its assault forces needed to take only a 100-mile overland route South to reach Luzon's capital city of Manila, shown clearly at left.

Commencing around noon on 6 January 1945, a heavy naval and air bombardment of suspected Japanese defenses on Lingayen began from their position inside the Gulf, the base of which is shown in the figure above. Estimates of resistance from the coastline and inland shores on the landing areas on the mouth of the Gulf proved inaccurate, as much of the bombardment proved unnecessary.

==== Minesweeping efforts ====
Demolitions near the planned landing sites on the base of the Gulf by Underwater Demolition Teams were undertaken, but they found no beach obstacles, and only one mine and encountered sparse opposing forces. Lieutenant Commander W. R. Loud, who commanded the minesweeper force, claimed to have found around ten additional mines in his sweeping efforts by end of day 7 January, though intelligence estimates by Philippine resistance may have overestimated the number present. Smith writes that surprisingly, during the 7th, exploratory sweeps during the morning "turned up only two floating mines and none of the moored type." Both sources seemed to indicate a total of less than 10–12 mines, not a particularly large number for a close approach to a landing area, considering the large numbers soon to be found off the beaches of Iwo Jima. As approach channels were swept, buoys were placed to delineate the areas where ships could approach or land safe from the threat of active contact mines.

The sweepers performed with efficiency and courage considering they were the constant target of air attacks, several causing damage, or the sinking of their ships. They performed their tasks effectively during 6–8 January, during frequent attack, and in difficult weather, including high waves on the Eastern base of the gulf near Lingayen during 7 January, which may have affected those craft closer to the eastern side of the Gulf. Aircraft and naval artillery bombardment of the landing areas also occurred, with kamikazes attacking on the 7th, though enemy kamikazes, bombers and torpedo planes had reigned terror on the naval forces on their long route to the Gulf from the 2nd and would continue through the 13th. Smith writes that Allied planes from Allied escort carriers flew "from 250 to 300 sorties during the period from 6 through 8 January", bombing and strafing targets along the beaches. Many downed enemy planes and kamikazes, but many escaped their grasp. Ian W. Toll writes that on 7 January, "in response to urgent requests from Admiral Kinkade and General MacArthur, Halsey threw his "big blue blanket" over Luzon." Airmen from the carriers, after returning to their ships, touted "claims of at least seventy-five Japanese planes destroyed on the ground." On the 8th, it was observed that in the town of Lingayen, as a response to the pre-landing bombardment, Filipinos had begun to form a parade, complete with United States and Philippine flags; fire was shifted away from that area.

=== Land battle ===
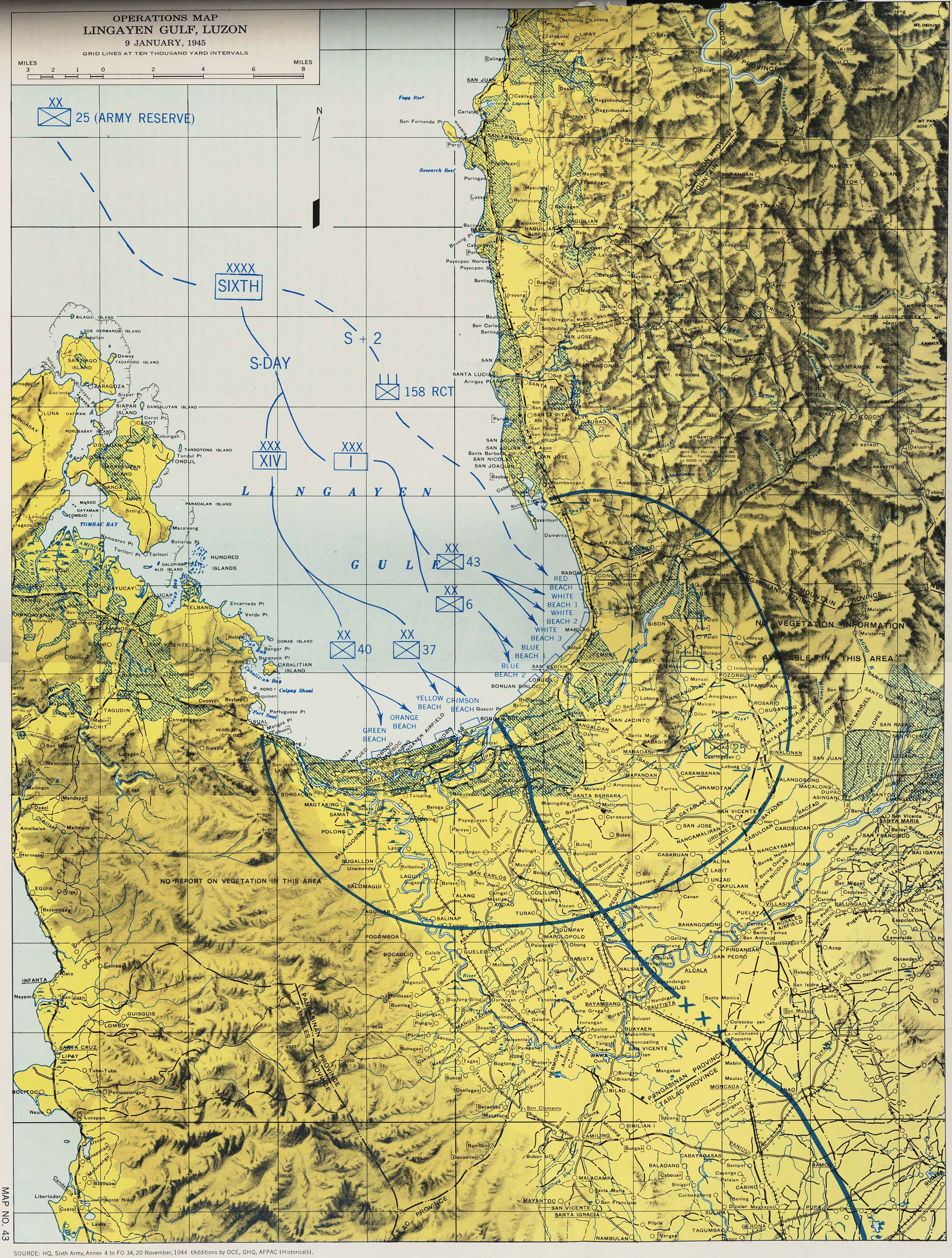
Landing areas for assault forces on Lingayen Gulf, West to East Port Saul, Lingayen Airport, San Fabian, XIV force West, I Corps East

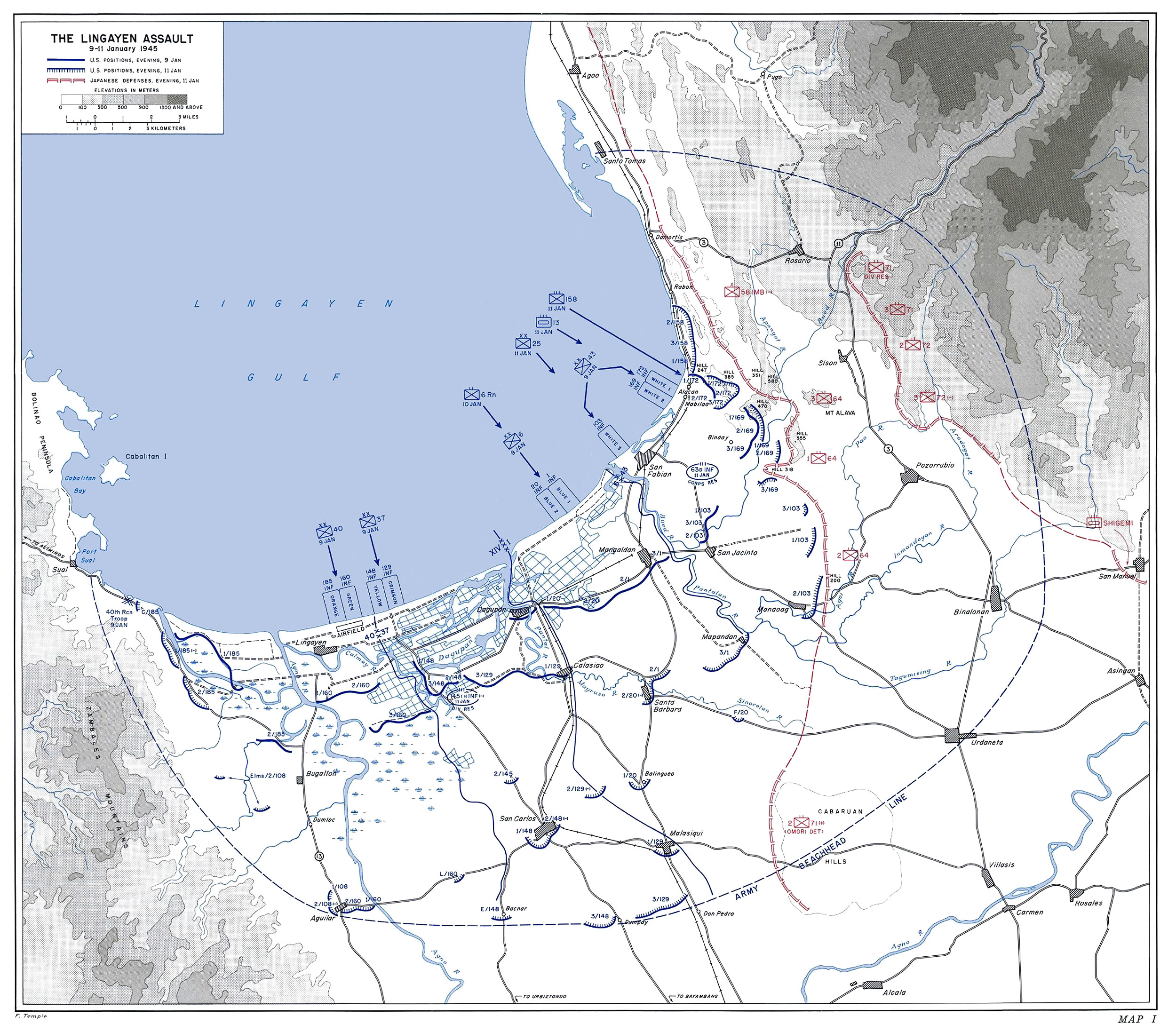
Landing areas for Assault forces on Lingayen Gulf, 9, 11 January 1945.

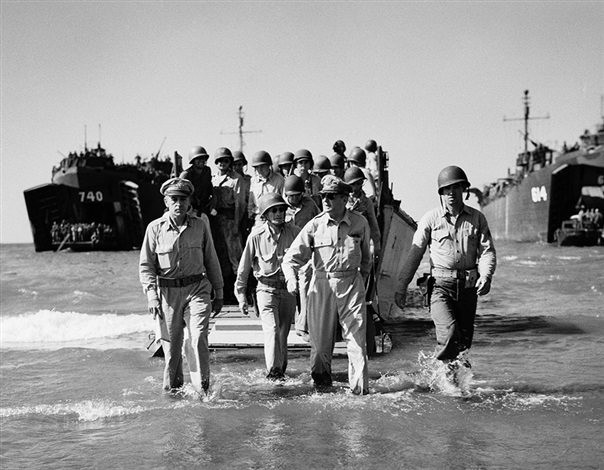
General Douglas MacArthur landing at "Blue Beach," Dagupan, Lingayen Gulf, 1945

As shown at left, at 09:30 on 9 January 1945, about 68,000 GIs under General Walter Krueger of the U.S. 6th Army—following a devastating naval bombardment—landed at the coast of Lingayen Gulf meeting no opposition. A total of 203,608 soldiers were eventually landed over the next few days, establishing a 20 mi (32 km) beachhead, stretching from Sual, and San Fabian at the far East of the map at the base of the Bolianu Peninsula, west to the central Gulf town of Dagupan (XIV Corps), and then to the far Western town of Lingayen. The location of XIV corps is shown by the blue line at the center of the figure at left. The Lingayen Assault Force landing areas are shown at left by blue rectangles near the town of Lingayen, and the assault forces are shown as the blue lines further inland. The San Fabian Assault force (I Corps) have landing areas shown as rectangles and a blue line indicating assault forces on right of figure by the town of San Fabian. The total number of troops under the command of MacArthur was reported to have even exceeded the number that Dwight D. Eisenhower controlled in Europe.

While aboard ship, Task Force 78, the San Fabian Attack Force, a full three days behind Admiral Oldendorf's Naval convoys, was commanded by Vice Admiral Daniel E. Barbey, and Task Force 79, the Lingayen Attack Force, an equal distance behind Oldendorf, was commanded by Vice Admiral Theodore Wilkinson. Once disembarking from their ships, the two ground-based assault Task Forces would put more U.S. troops ashore on the first day at Lingayen than those arriving on the bloody beaches of Normandy on Day one of D-Day. Within a few days, the assault forces had quickly captured the coastal towns and secured the 20-mile-long (32 km) beachhead, as well as penetrating up to five miles (8.0 km) inland.

=== Heavy losses on land and sea ===
Despite their success in driving out the Japanese forces stationed there, the Americans and their mostly Australian allies suffered relatively heavy losses; particularly to their convoys, due to kamikaze attacks. While not the highest in U.S. casualties, the subsequent Battle for Luzon was the highest net casualty battle U.S. forces fought in World War II, with 192,000 to 217,000 Japanese combatants dead, though some sources quote losses as high as 380,000 for the entire conflict including non-combat casualties (mostly from starvation and disease). The battle saw 8,000 American combatants killed, or as many as 10,000 in the entire conflict. Total non-combat American casualty estimates have ranged as high as 93,400 among the Sixth Army when illness from disease and non-combat injuries are accounted for. However, to these staggering losses, there must also be added the over 150,000 Filipinos killed, many during the Battle of Manila, but with an overwhelming number of Filipino civilians murdered by Japanese forces, as a result of the Manila massacre of February 1945.

=== Overview of ships damaged 3–13 January 1945 ===
During the invasion by sea, which is the primary subject of this article, from 13 December 1944 – 13 January 1945, including the time Allied ships entered the Philippines through Leyte Gulf to Lingayen, as well as action taken two weeks before off the Northern Philippine Islands of Mindoro and Marinduque, a total of 24 Allied ships were sunk and another 67 were damaged by kamikazes, though this number includes naval activities off the West coast of Luzon, outside of Lingayen Gulf, off the Philippine Visaya Islands and the Island of Mindoro, which were necessary as preliminaries to secure the Island of Luzon for the invasion force. Ships damaged by kamikazes between 3–11 January on the way to Lingayen included the battleships USS Mississippi, New Mexico and California (the latter was also accidentally hit by friendly fire), the heavy cruiser HMAS Australia, the light cruiser USS Columbia, and the destroyer minesweepers USS Long and USS Hovey. Following the landings, Lingayen Gulf was turned into a vast supply depot for the rest of the war to support the Battle of Luzon.

General Douglas MacArthur was embarked on the light cruiser USS Boise. On 5 January a Japanese midget submarine shot two torpedoes at Boise but the cruiser took evasive actions to avoid getting hit. On 7 January a Japanese airplane dropped a bomb and barely missed hitting Boise. Throughout the operation, Boise shot anti-aircraft artillery at the Japanese kamikazes and witnessed numerous ships close to it getting hit.

==== USS Ommaney Bay sunk ====
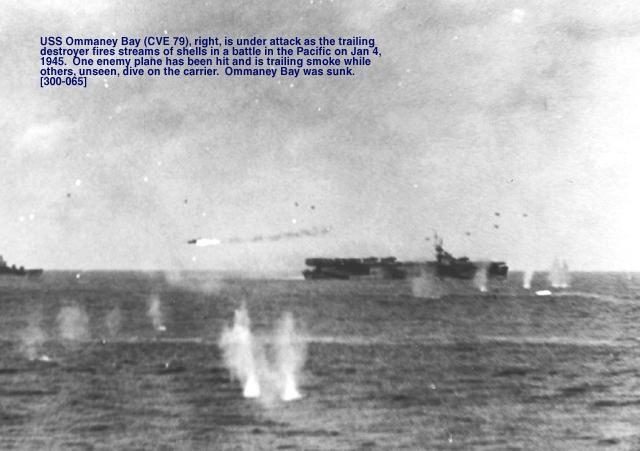
Ommaney Bay under attack by kamikaze aircraft, 3 January 1945.

On 3 January 1945, the USS Ommaney Bay, a large escort carrier, was severely damaged by a Yokosuka P1Y kamikaze carrying two bombs. At 17:12, the Yokosuka P1Y penetrated a Destroyer screen undetected and made for Ommaney, approaching directly towards the ship's bow. Captain Young of the Ommaney later reported that the kamikaze's approach was concealed by the blinding glare of the sun. The captain, aware of the kamikaze threat, had assigned multiple lookouts throughout the carrier's deck. But a lack of radar signals, a common and vexing problem during the battle, had led the task group to believe that the Japanese planes had withdrawn, and the kamikaze attack took the lookouts by complete surprise. New Mexico was only able to respond with inaccurate anti-aircraft fire, whilst Ommaney Bay was unable to react at all.

The plane sliced across the superstructure with its wing, collapsing it onto the flight deck, and then veered into her flight deck on the forward starboard side, releasing the two bombs, with one penetrating the flight deck and setting off a series of explosions among the fully gassed planes on the hangar deck. Pressure to her water main was lost when the second bomb passed through the hangar deck, making it more difficult to fight fires. Fires and explosions, including the intense heat and dark smoke of an oil fire, continued until the decision was made to scuttle her with a torpedo later in the day. Considered sunk by Naval statistics, her kamikaze strike, though coming early in the battle, represented the greatest loss of life to a single ship with 93 killed and 65 wounded. 19 Grumman FM-2 Wildcat fighters and 10 Grumman TBM Avenger torpedo bombers went down with Ommaney Bay. None of her planes were able to take off before the attack.

==== USS Manila Bay struck ====
It is strongly speculated by Samuel Eliot Morison that the late afternoon kamikaze strikes on 5 January between 16:51 and 17:50 on USS Helm, HMAS Arunta, USS Louisville, HMAS Australia, USS Manila Bay, and USS Savo Island came from 16 kamikaze planes and 4 escorts that took off at 15:57 from the Japanese airbase at Mabalacat, formerly Clark Air Base, north of Manila. The attacks occurred west of Luzon about 100 miles (160 km) off the coast of Corregidor. The air base's relative proximity to the Allied ships insured relatively full tanks, and the tactical training they had received from Commander Tadashi Nakajima in kamikaze targeting methods, maneuvering and dive strategies increased their chances of making it to their targets and dealing a more damaging strike.

Just before 17:50, on 5 January, two kamikazes dove at Manila Bay from the portside. The first plane hit the flight deck to starboard abaft the bridge, causing fires on the flight and hangar decks, destroying radar transmitting spaces, and wiping out all communications. The second plane, aimed for the bridge, missed the island close aboard to starboard and hit the sea off the fantail. Eight Grumman TBM Avenger torpedo bombers and one Grumman FM-2 Wildcat fighter were destroyed by the kamikaze attack.

Firefighting parties promptly brought the blazes under control, including those caused by two fueled and burning torpedo planes in the hangar deck. Within 24 hours, she resumed limited air operations. Most repairs to her damaged electrical and communication circuits were completed by 9 January, when the amphibious invasion in Lingayen Gulf got underway. Manila Bay had 14 men killed and 52 wounded, but by 10 January she resumed full duty in support of the Lingayen Gulf operations. In addition to providing air cover for the task force, her planes flew 104 sorties against targets in western Luzon.

==== HMAS Australia struck five times ====
The heavy cruiser HMAS Australia was the only invasion ship struck five times, though her considerable casualties of forty-four dead and seventy-two wounded were the result of only the first two strikes, of which only the second caused serious damage.

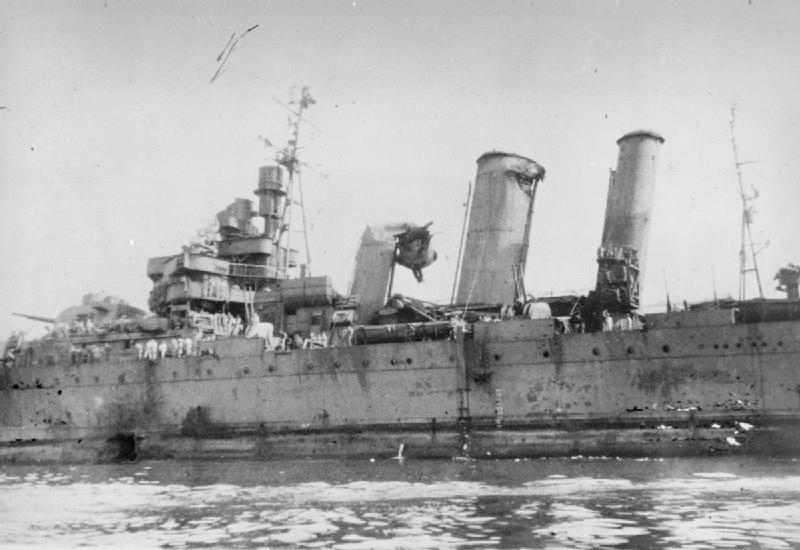
Australia in January 1945, with accumulated kamikaze damage

While roughly 50 miles (80 km) northwest of Manila Bay on her approach to the mouth of the Gulf to provide fire support for the Lingayen landings at San Fabian, Australia was struck portside amidships at 17:35 on 5 January. Twenty-five were killed and thirty were wounded, though Morison put the figures at thirty killed and forty-six wounded, mostly from the gun crews of the port-side secondary and anti-aircraft guns. However, the damage to the ship was not serious enough to withdraw her from her duties, and she continued in operation. The ships reached the gulf early on 6 January, and by 11:00, Australia had commenced pre-landing bombardment.

While in the gulf, a second kamikaze rammed the cruiser at 17:34 on 6 January between the starboard 4-inch guns, killing fourteen and wounding twenty-six. The casualties again consisted primarily of gun crews, and after this point, there were only enough trained personnel to man one 4-inch gun on each side of the cruiser. Another aircraft attempted to ram Australia at 18:28, but this was shot down by the USS Columbia.

On 8 January, Australia was attacked twice by kamikazes in quick succession: at 07:20, a twin-engine bomber hit the water 20 yards (18 m) near the cruiser and skidded to connect with the ship's port flank, then a second aircraft attacked at 07:39, again shot down just before it hit the port side at the waterline. A bomb carried by the second attacker opened a 14-by-8-foot (4.3 by 2.4 m) hole in the hull, causing a 5-degree list, but despite the explosion and a large quantity of debris and shrapnel, casualties were limited to a few cases of shock, and Australia was deemed capable of carrying out the bombardments assigned to her that day.

Finally at 13:11 on 9 January, the fifth and final suicide aircraft to hit Australia during the operation struck. Although the plane likely intended to take out the cruiser's bridge, it hit a mast strut and the forward exhaust funnel, and fell overboard. Although there were no casualties, the crash damaged the funnel, radar, and wireless systems, and the decision was made to withdraw the cruiser for repairs.

==== Loss of USS Brooks and USS Long ====
Departing New Guinea's Manus Island in late December, while escorting a Leyte-bound convoy, USS Hovey and the ships of Mine Squadron 2 detached from their charges on 2 January 1945, and shaped a course for Lingayen Gulf, where the group was ordered to sweep the approaches to Lingayen in advance of the first American amphibious landing on Luzon. Coming under repeated massed air attack from Japanese kamikaze aircraft while engaged in their sweeps, Hovey and her sisters spent the time period from 2 January facing frequent fire from Japanese aircraft attempting to repel the invading ships.

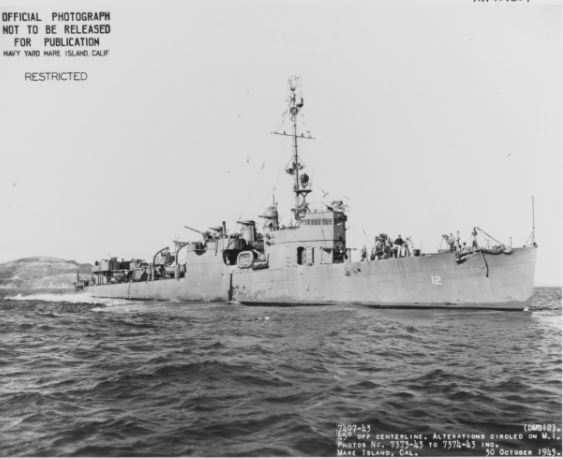
USS Long, starboard bridge at center, 30 October 1943

As her minesweeping unit swept the gulf on 6 January, several kamikazes launched an attack on Hovey and her formation, severely damaging USS Brooks around 12:52, and just earlier claiming Hovey's sister ship USS Long around 12:15. Hovey would take a number of survivors of Brooks from HMAS Warramunga, which had picked up part of her crew after she had been abandoned due to fires. Around 12:15, prior to the Brooks giving the order to abandon her crew, Hovey slipped her gear and stood in to assist Long. Long had been hit by a low flying kamikaze Mitsubishi Zero on her portside below the bridge about one foot (0.30 m) above the waterline. Soon the entire bridge and well deck was on fire, and fearing explosions to the forward magazine and ready ammunition, the order was given by Captain Stanley Caplan to abandon ship to those men trapped in the forecastle forward of the forward mast, though the crew aft abandoned ship. Because of the fire and continued air attacks, Hovey could not get alongside, but spent an hour picking up 149 survivors, nearly the entire ship's complement.

After a second kamikaze hit near the bridge later on 6 January, with her back broken, Long eventually sank on the morning of 7 January at 16°12'N, 120°11'E, in the gulf about 10 miles (16 km) north of the beaches of Lingayen. Completing her sweeps by end of day, Hovey withdrew with the rest of her division as darkness fell to open waters outside of Lingayen Gulf.

At 03:45 on the morning of 7 January, Commander Loud's Hovey, with her load of survivors from both Long and Brooks still crammed aboard, was positioned, along with the rest of the large minesweeper group, off the northwest corner of the Gulf, abreast of Cape Balinao. Steaming ahead were the destroyer escorts Barton, Walke, Radford, and Leutze, intending to provide support against coastal batteries, including those stationed off Cape Balinao, if necessary.

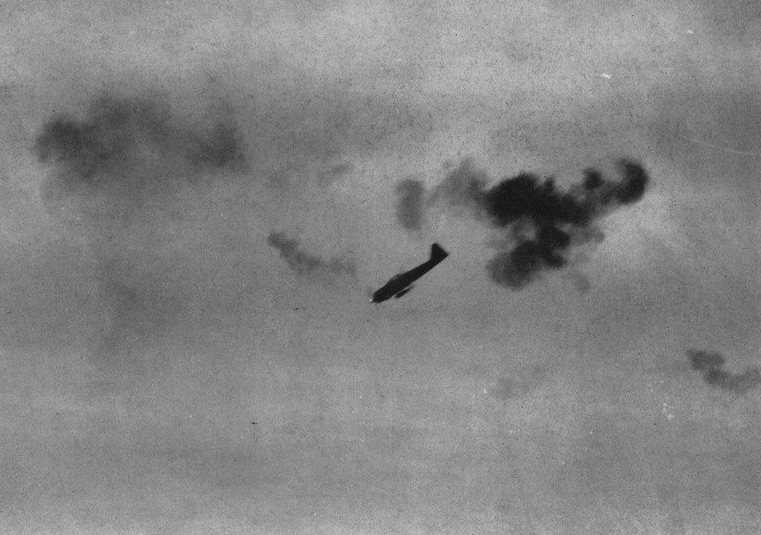
Kamikaze Zero dives in overcast, Philippines, 1945

Acting as flagship, Hovey took the lead of her formation and began sweeping operations shortly after 04:00. Less than half an hour later, radar reports flashed out that enemy aircraft were inbound, and Hovey's crew again secured her sweep gear and manned their guns. Sighting two inbound planes, at least one a torpedo bomber, flying just above the water materializing out of the predawn darkness and haze at 04:50, Hovey's gunners took both aircraft under fire. The second aircraft was set afire from the gunners aboard USS Chandler as it closed on Hovey's port side, splashing over her starboard beam. The plane may have received additional fire from Hovey's gunners. At the same instant, a torpedo released from one of the planes found its mark and slammed into Hovey's starboard side at her aft engine room. The force of the blast buckled Hovey's keel and killed most of the men in her after engine room, in addition to knocking out power and communications to most of the ship. Within seconds the midship was exposed to massive flooding that snapped her keel in half and caused the ship to begin breaking up.

==== USS Hovey sinks from aerial torpedo ====
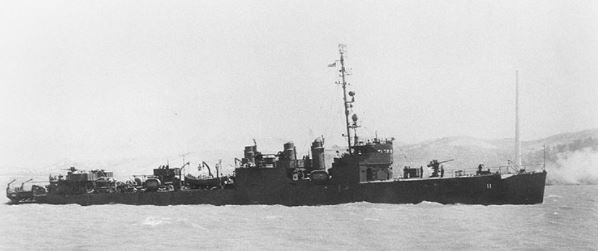
USS Hovey configured as minesweeper, May 1943

Within two minutes of the torpedo impact, Hovey's bow section was listing 90 degrees as men stationed there scrambled to abandon the sinking vessel. Moments later, a bulkhead gave way and sent the bow vertical in the water where for a few seconds it lingered before plunging to the bottom. Hovey's stern remained on an even keel as it slowly swamped, allowing most of the crew and rescued sailors there to get off before it too sank at this location at 04:55 on 7 January 1945. When Hovey sank, she took 24 of her crew and 24 men from her sister ships Long, and Brooks with her to the bottom. Five of those lost when Hovey sank came from Brooks. She sank roughly 20 miles (32 km) north of the base of the gulf at a depth of 54 fathoms (324 ft; 99 m), at 16°20'N 120°10'E. Chandler, soon stood by rescuing the survivors of all three ships from the sinking Hovey, a total of 229 crew. Of the 229 men Chandler rescued from Hovey, roughly half were likely survivors of Long, and had escaped from two successively abandoned and badly damaged ships.

==== USS New Mexico struck ====
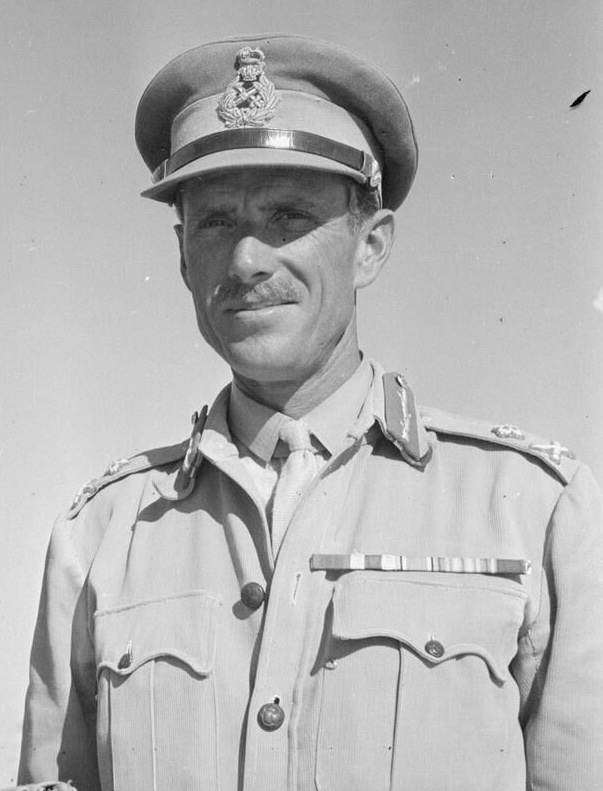
British Army Lieutenant General Herbert Lumsden

At 1159 on 6 January 1945 a kamikaze struck the bridge of the battleship USS New Mexico. The ship sustained 30 dead and 87 wounded, including her commanding officer, Captain Robert Fleming, and Lieutenant General Herbert Lumsden, British Prime Minister Winston Churchill's personal liaison to General Douglas MacArthur. He was the most senior British Army combat fatality of World War II. Also on the bridge were Rear Admiral George Weyler, commander of the San Fabian fire support force and previously the commander of the battleship fleet in the Battle of Leyte Gulf a few months earlier, and British Admiral Sir Bruce Fraser, commander of the British Pacific Fleet: However they were on the starboard side and unharmed. They were only a few yards from being killed or seriously wounded.

==== USS California struck ====
Shortly after 17:15 on 6 January, two kamikaze Zeros approached USS California. Her gunners shot down one, but the other struck her at port by her mainmast. The kamikaze's fuel tanks leaked gasoline, starting a fire and a 5-inch shell from another ship accidentally hit one of her 5-inch guns, which exploded inside the turret, and started another fire. The fires were quickly suppressed, but significant casualties resulted, including 44 killed and 155 injured.

==== USS Louisville hit twice ====
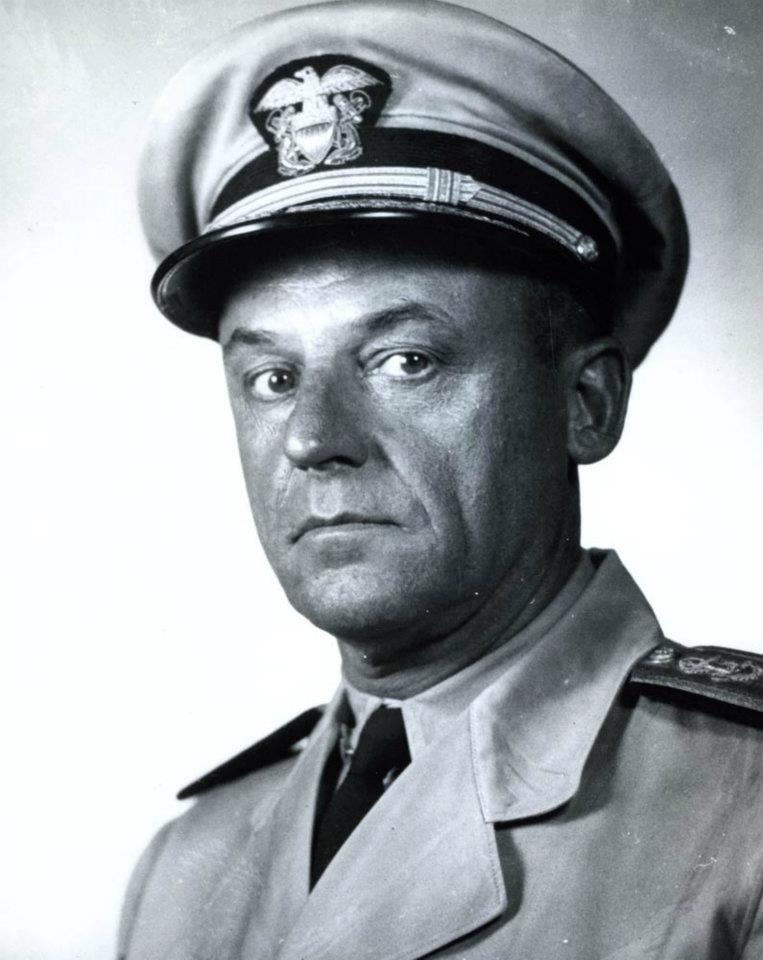
Admiral Theodore Chandler

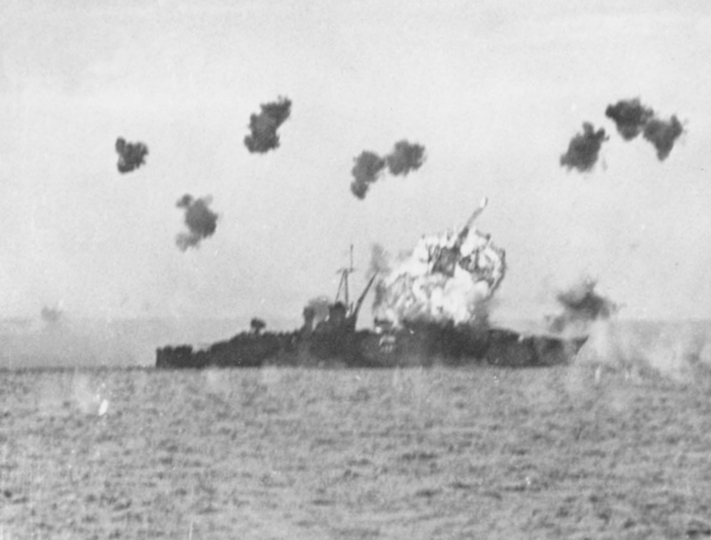
USS Louisville attacked, 6 January 1945

Rear Admiral Theodore E. Chandler, Commander of Cruiser Division 4, died from his wounds on 7 January 1945, a day after the bridge of the heavy cruiser USS Louisville, where he was helping to direct operations, was struck a devastating blow by a kamikaze, having received a less damaging strike by a kamikaze on the previous day. Admiral Chandler received a posthumous Navy Cross for his direction of operations aboard the besieged cruiser. Chandler was the highest-ranking U.S. Navy flag officer killed in action in World War II. The other four admirals who died in World War II due to combat were Rear Admirals Isaac C. Kidd, Daniel J. Callaghan, Norman Scott, and Henry M. Mullinnix.

==== USS Mississippi struck ====
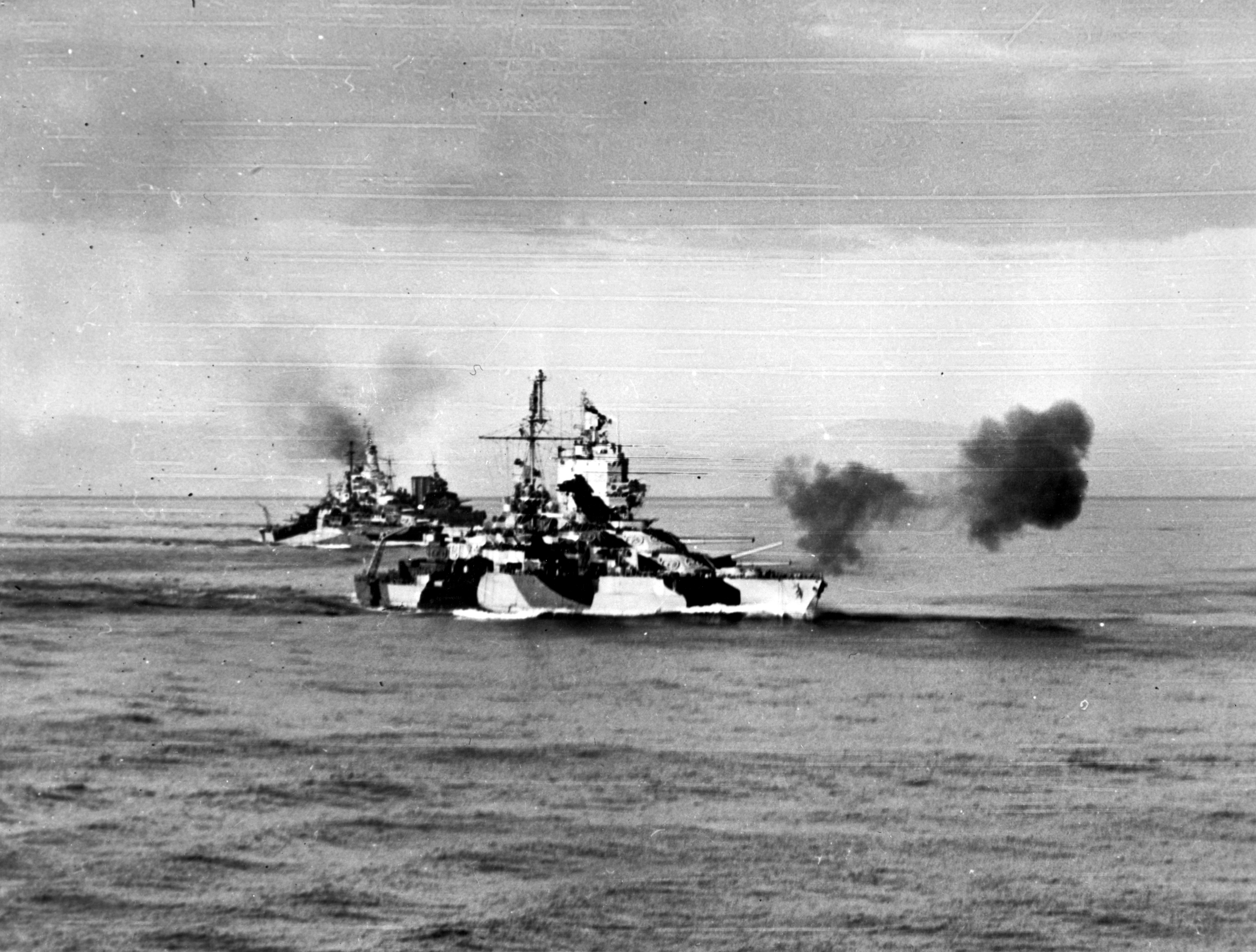
Mississippi supporting a Lingayen Gulf landing

USS Mississippi began shelling Japanese positions on the island of Luzon on 6 January 1945. During the bombardment, a Japanese kamikaze struck the ship on 9 January at 13:02, but she remained on station, bombarding the Japanese defenses, until 10 February, when she withdrew to Pearl Harbor for repairs. At 13:03, a Japanese "Val" had struck the battleship on the port side below bridge level, landing on an anti-aircraft gun and toppling over the side. Twenty-three were killed and sixty-three wounded, giving the battleship one of the heavier casualty rates of those struck.

==== USS Belknap struck ====
At 07:53, on 11 January 1945, the Clemson-class destroyer USS Belknap was forced to train all her guns on a Japanese kamikaze which eventually crashed her number two stack, nearly disabling her engines, and resulting in the death of 38 and wounding 49 of her crew. These included Underwater Demolition Team 9, on board when she was hit, which cost the team one officer, 7 enlisted, 3 missing in action and 13 wounded. Earlier, from 3–11 January 1945, she had acted as a shore bombardment and beach reconnaissance vessel at the Lingayen landings.

==== SS Kyle Johnson, David D. Field damaged ====
One of the worst losses of life was suffered by merchant marine vessel SS Kyle V. Johnson at 18:30 on 12 January, when a kamikaze dive, among a group of six attacking enemy planes, started a large fire, killing 120 men. Two of the planes splashed just short of SS David Dudley Field, causing minor engine room damage, but Edward N. Wescott received considerable damage from flying debris, wounding six of her merchant seamen, and seven of her Naval armed guard crew. With few enemy planes remaining on Luzon, the kamikazes went after victims of opportunity, the slower, cargo ships, which certainly had poorer air defenses than battleships and cruisers, yet represented a large target, that may have had somewhat limited mobility due to their size, weight, and weather conditions in the gulf.

==== Escort carrier Salamaua struck ====
At 08:58 on 13 January, the escort carrier USS Salamaua was struck by an unidentified kamikaze who dove almost vertically at too great a speed to give the ship's gunners time to respond. The plane, which plunged through the flight deck, carried two 250-kilogram (550 lb) bombs, one under each wing. One bomb exploded causing fires on the flight deck, hangar deck, and a few additional areas. The second bomb did not explode but penetrated the ship's starboard side at the waterline. With a loss of power communication and steering, fifteen men aboard Salamaua were killed, and eighty-eight wounded. Two Grumman FM-2 fighters and one Grumman TBM torpedo bomber were destroyed by the kamikaze attack. The starboard engine was lost, and the after engine room flooded, but anti-aircraft gunners splashed two enemy planes in a period of ten minutes. After temporary repairs, she managed to leave the gulf under her own power while under the screen of two destroyers and return to Leyte. She was the last vessel to be struck by kamikazes in the Lingayen Gulf conflict, as after 12 January, the Japanese had expended every aircraft they had in the Philippines. Only 47 Japanese planes escaped from the islands, and after 15 January, it was believed only ten Japanese planes were left on the entire island of Luzon.

== Success of kamikazes ==
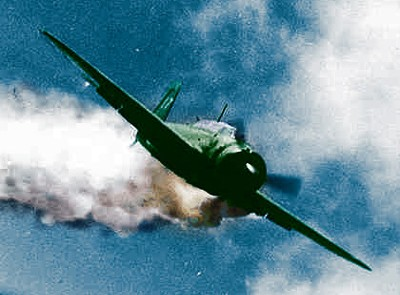
D4Y Kamikaze plane dives on USS Essex, 1944

According to several naval historians, kamikazes were likely used more successfully by the Japanese at Lingayen Gulf, and beginning in the last two weeks of December 1944 in the Western Philippine islands of the Visayas and Mindoro, than in any other Pacific conflict with the possible exception of the Battle of Okinawa. At least for the kamikaze attacks on 6 January at Lingayen Gulf and likely earlier in the battle, eminent Naval historian Samuel Eliot Morison wrote, they were "the most effective of the war in relation to the number of planes involved – 28 kamikazes and 15 fighter escorts." Though General McArthur had written that 58 kamikazes were employed on 6 and 18 January fighter escorts, a few more than Morison's estimate, Morison's conclusion as to the effectiveness of kamikazes still seems well taken considering the staggering damage done by roughly 100–200 kamikazes to around 47 ships in the ten days of the battle between 3 – 13 January, shown in the large table below. Those ten days in January 1945 on the way to and within Luzon's Lingayen Gulf resulted in the deaths of around 738 and the wounding of 1282 ship-based seamen, marines, and infantry.

Contemporary author, Ian Toll, noted at the time of the invasion, the fate of Japan's airpower on the island of Luzon was sealed. He wrote "The 201st Air Group, headquartered at Mabalacat, could muster only about 40 aircraft in flyable condition. Throughout all of the Philippines, there was probably no more than 200 remaining planes." Subtracting the estimate of 75 planes destroyed on the ground by carrier based American planes on 7 January discussed earlier, a rough estimate of only 100-150 airworthy planes may have remained on Luzon during the first two weeks of the invasion. In the last week of December (1944), the Imperial Headquarters had decreed that the Philippines would receive no further air reinforcements." Tokyo had ordered, and the 201st had complied with the decision that with the exception of a number of planes designated as escorts, "all remaining aircraft were to be launched against the American fleet in suicide attacks".

=== Luzon kamikazes on 6 January ===
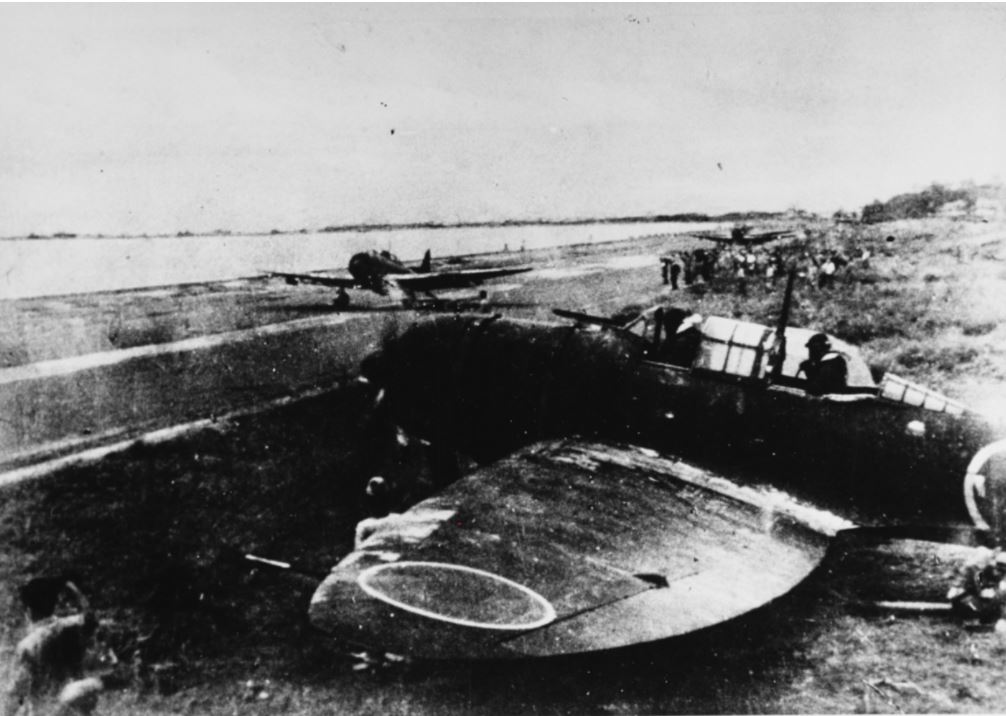
Kamikaze "Val" dive bombers take off from airfield outside Manila, 1944–1945

Samuel Morison estimated that on 6 January, around twenty-eight kamikaze hit 15 ships, representing a hit rate of nearly 50%, vastly exceeding the 10–15% hit rate of kamikazes throughout the Pacific conflict. Ian Toll wrote that by the morning of 6 January at Mabalacat airfield, "five derelicts were patched up to the extent that they could take off", though they were not air bound until around 16:55 that afternoon. Commander Tadashi Nakajima, head of kamikaze operations and training for the Philippines, estimated there were five kamikazes taking off from the nearby Angeles Field at 11:00 that morning, eight more at 10:40 from Echague, just Northeast of the Gulf, and an additional 9 from an airport on Luzon unnamed by Nakajima, bringing the total number to around twenty-seven on 6 January. The single Mabalacat kamikaze departing around midday on 6 January, and those from Angeles and Echague may have been responsible for strikes on any of the ten ships struck around noon that day including the battleship New Mexico or the destroyers Leary, Allen M. Sumner, Long or Brooks.

The five kamikazes taking off from Mabalacat around 1655 were directed by the Japanese pilot Lieutenant K. Nakano, as appointed by Commander Tadashi Nakajima, the head of the 201st kamikaze Special Attack Unit, and responsible for the training and operation of kamikaze forces in the Philippines. Nakano's kamikazes were well trained according to Commander Nakajima, and apparently an effective force. Mabalacat's late afternoon sortie at 16:55 would most likely have made strikes from roughly 17:20–17:34 beginning with California, and may have been responsible for the strike on Newcombe, and secondary strikes on Louisville, and Australia. Those fifteen minutes represented some of the worst damage done to Allied vessels during the late afternoon of 6 January. Noting the destructive power in only three of the early days of the invasion, Morison further noted that between 3–6 January alone, 25 Allied ships were damaged by kamikazes, of which three suffered two or more attacks. Morison described 6 January, which saw fifteen ships damaged, as the "worst blow to the United States Navy since the Battle of Tassafaronga on 30 November 1942".

=== 30% kamikaze "hit" rate, 3–13 Jan 45 ===
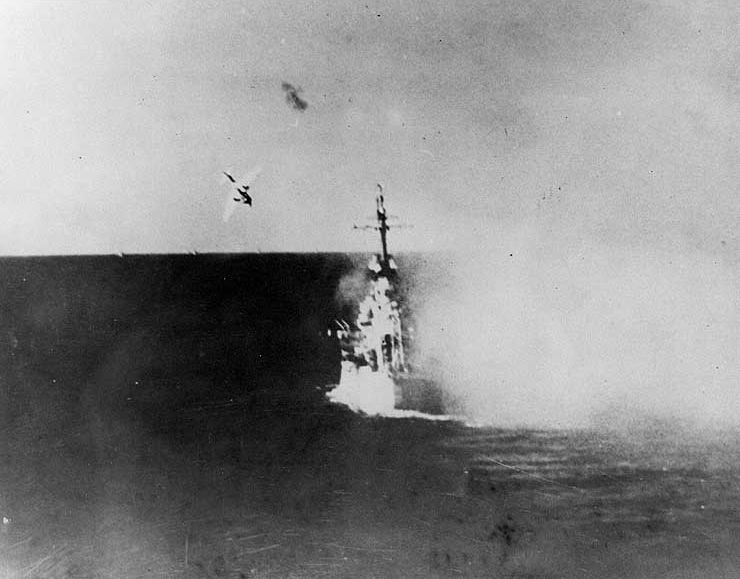
Kamikaze attacks on USS Columbia, 6 January

According to a U.S. Air Force webpage, despite anti-aircraft fire, radar detection, and airborne interception, roughly 14 percent of kamikazes survived to score a hit on a US ship, and nearly 8.5 percent of all ships hit by kamikazes sank. Considering that roughly 150 kamikazes survived to complete around 54 strikes on 47 ships at Lingayen from 3–13 January 1945 at Lingayen, as shown in the table below, this would indicate a "hit" rate closer to 30 percent and a sinking rate of ships struck (4 ships sunk/54 strikes) of only around 7.4 percent, though slightly higher, closer to 10%, if the destroyer transport Brooks, irreparably damaged and needing to be towed, is counted. The sinking rate is slightly skewed as both the Hovey and Palmer were sunk by torpedo or bomb hits, but it may be argued both ships were still struck or nearly struck by kamikazes, as Hovey certainly was buzzed by a kamikaze, and the "Betty" bomber that sunk Palmer, at 18:35 on 7 January after releasing its bombs, according to Morison, "turned as if to attack another ship and splashed". Smith suggests that as few as 100 kamikazes were responsible for roughly 30 strikes on Allied ships from 2–8 January, and though this is also a rough approximation, it again represents an approximate "hit" rate on allied ships approaching 30%.

=== "Hit" rate lower at Okinawa ===
Though the damaged ships from kamikazes were greater at Okinawa, roughly three times as many, there were at least seven times more aircraft deployed there, as between 6 April and 22 June 1945, the Japanese flew 1,465 kamikaze aircraft in large-scale attacks from Kyushu, and 250 individual kamikaze sorties from Formosa. Morison, an admiral himself by 1945, and an observer of naval tactics, theorized that the better trained Japanese pilots including those using kamikaze tactics had been expended prior to Okinawa, and those trained for the battle there lacked time to gain commensurate skills with those available at the Battle of Lingayen. He wrote, "Off Okinawa, the Navy would be faced with an even more intensive suicide effort, but by that time the cream of the Kamikaze crop had destroyed itself, and the Allied Navies had additional means of protection".

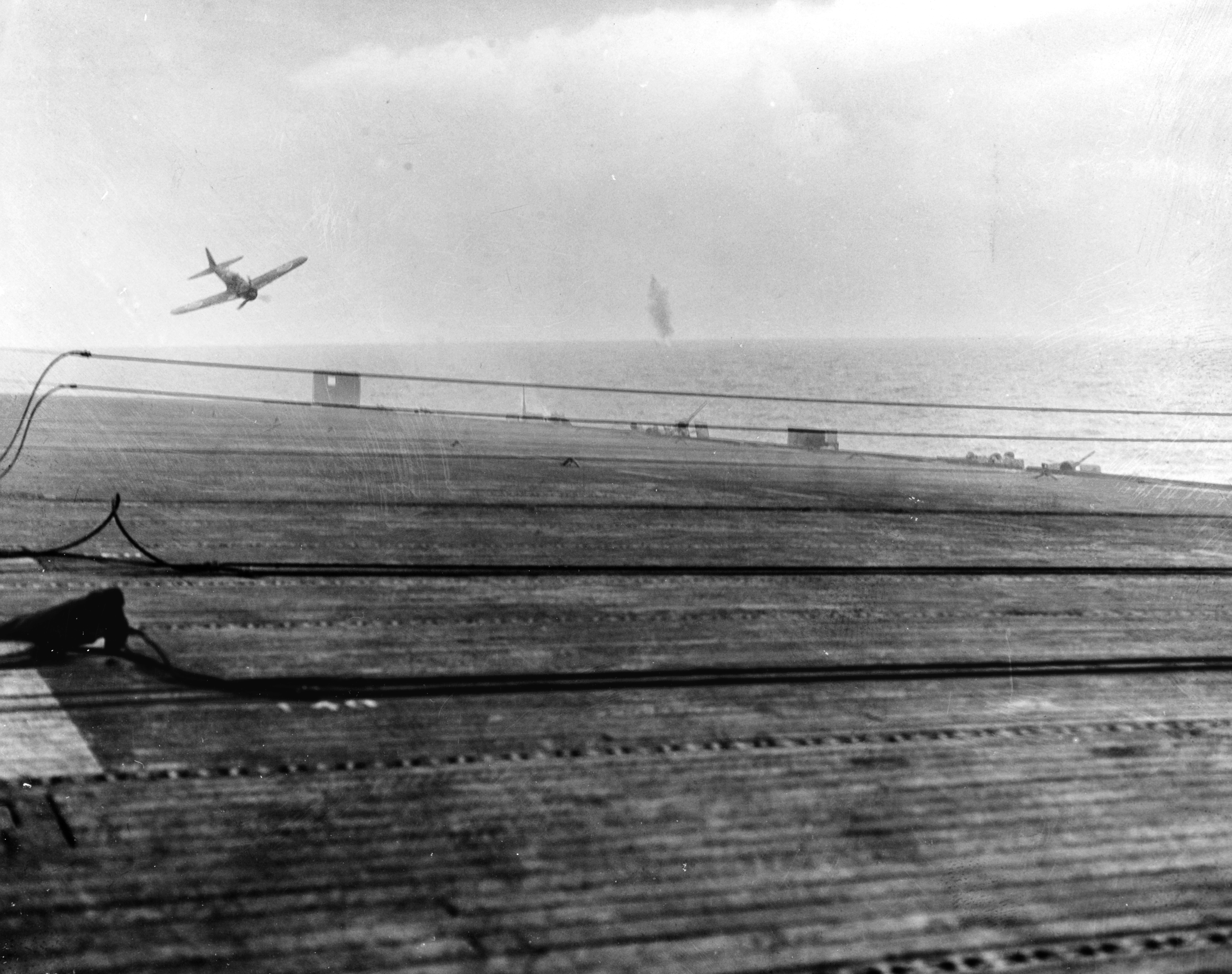
Kamikaze Mitsubishi A6M5 Model 52 "Zero" (left) on low angle dive

As Robert Ross Smith noted, of the very roughly one to one hundred fifty Japanese aircraft that had attacked American Admiral Oldendorf's naval forces at Lingayen Gulf between 2 and 13 January 1945, the vast majority had tried kamikaze crashes, even if they had not been successful.

=== Kamikaze "hit" rate, 13 Dec – 13 Jan 45 ===
Ross further estimated that in the longer period between 13 December 1944, and 13 January 1945, at Lingayen, the island of Luzon and to a smaller extent the Philippine's Visaya Islands, the Japanese lost roughly 200 planes in successful or unsuccessful kamikaze dives on ships. During this month long period, according to Smith, who used data from Morison, kamikazes were almost exclusively responsible for sinking 24 Allied ships, heavily damaging 30 and lightly damaging 37. This represents an approximate 200 kamikazes achieving damaging strikes on roughly 91 Allied ships, suggesting a very rough "hit" rate approaching 48%, though the figure is likely lower.

=== Evasive tactics, armor ===
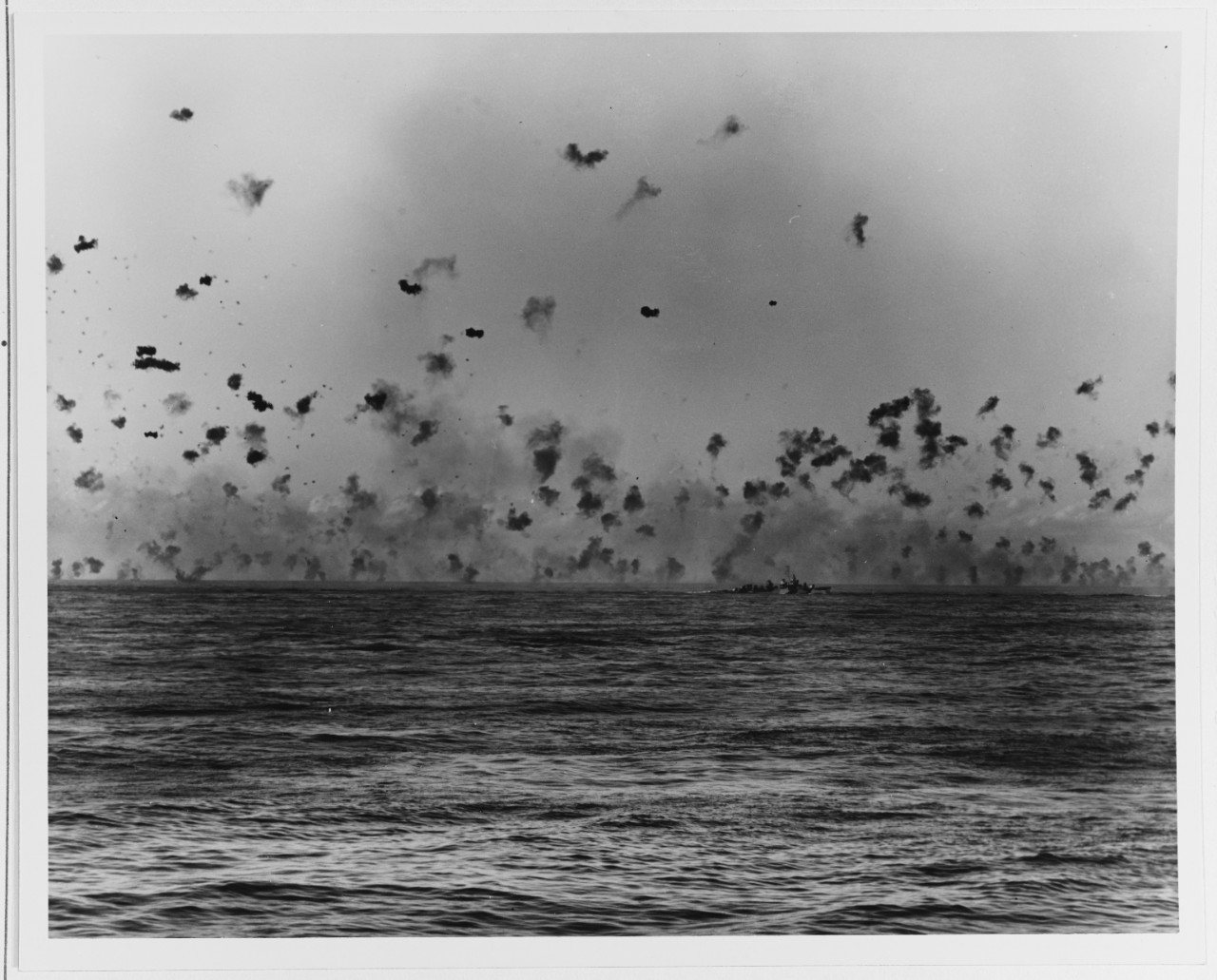
Hail of anti-aircraft fire at Lingayen, 1 October 1945

Allied anti-aircraft guns were often ineffective against the kamikazes due to their speed, and maneuverability and because the operators of 5-inch guns, which used the highly effective proximity fuses, were unable to effectively sight the low angle, carefully maneuvered enemy planes that frequently dove with the sun behind them. Moreover, the projectiles of the typical 20 and 40 mm anti-aircraft guns used in allied ships, "did not have sufficient explosive power or impact to knock out heavily armored kamikazes" despite hitting the planes repeatedly with a hail of shells from an individual gun or what might at times even be combined gunfire from more than one ship.

At the Battle of Lingayen Gulf, kamikaze pilots were flying toward Allied ships at extremely low angles to circumvent detection by both radar and sighting ship crews. Smith states, "Flight tactics included radical maneuvering designed not only to avoid antiaircraft fire and Allied planes but also to confuse observers as to which ship was the actual target." Of equal or greater consequence, many of the kamikaze planes were heavily armored and armed to a greater extent than during their use at the Battle of Leyte Gulf, where some of the planes had been selected because they were already damaged.

=== Zeros outperformed US Wildcat fighters ===
Rear Admiral Calvin T. Durgin, who commanded many of the escort carriers partly tasked with launching the fighter aircraft that would provide cover to the advancing ships of the invasion force, noted that his widely used fighter the FM-2 Wildcat, "showed up inferior to the Japanese Zeke (Zero), not only in speed and maneuver, but in climbing ability in altitudes above 5000 feet; and we had not enough Wildcats." A significant percentage of the Japanese planes used as kamikazes were Zeros, and they could be just as effective acting as escorts to provide cover for Japanese planes that could later be used as kamikazes. As noted by Smith, "kamikazes continually slipped through the air cover, and the CVE-based (Carrier Escort) planes had knocked down less than half of all Japanese aircraft destroyed from 2 through 6 January. Interception, as a result of the Japanese flight tactics and the radar problems, became largely a matter of luck in the Lingayen Gulf area."

=== Limitations of radar aided the kamikazes ===
The terrain was mountainous in the Lingayen Gulf area, including near the mouth of the Gulf, at times limiting the ability of radar on the invasion ships, particularly near the mountainous coast of the gulf, to detect the arrival of kamikazes and their escorts and vector in American fighters to oppose them.

=== Detrimental effects of weather and shoals ===
The argument could also be made that once within Lingayen Gulf, the current, shoals, winds, waves, and storms that the gulf was known for made maneuvering the advancing Allied ships somewhat more difficult, and more likely to break formation and become isolated, though the prevailing weather for the advancing convoy west of Luzon was far better than the weather experienced by the fast carriers of Fast Carrier Task Force 38, North and East of Luzon which significantly hampered the operation of their air defenses. According to the observations of the Commander, Carrier Task Force 38, the primary source of fighter cover provided by the Fast carriers, "At sea,... strong winds, rough seas, and heavy swells were recorded on 6 January through 9 January (1945). These conditions definitely hampered landing of planes and the work of the deck crews," at least for 1–2 days, making air support from sea-based carriers more difficult. As a more general statement of the Fast Carrier Group, TF 38, "weather conditions on S minus 6 day and S day (from the 3rd to the 9th of January or S-day)... were so poor that the success of our mission was in question much of the time."

==== Effects of overcast on 6 January ====
According to the Aerology and Amphibious Warfare report, the Third Amphibious Force's Commander noted "During the initial stages of the approach to the target cloudy weather and intermittent rain" prevailed. During the invasion's forces preliminary approach, it was also noted, that "overcast conditions prevailed due to intermediate type cloudiness, and occasional areas of very light precipitation were encountered." Intermittent rain and cloudy conditions, even if slight, combined with the thick smoke caused by the bombardment groups by mid-day 6 January, may have affected visibility at least on the critical days of 6–7 January, which would have significantly reduced the ability of ships within the gulf to sight kamikazes, and to a smaller extent, light to moderate winds may have hampered the maneuverability of smaller ships evading kamikaze attacks, and the wave activity on the East side of the gulf may have somewhat reduced the ability of smaller ships to effectively aim anti-aircraft guns at the enemy. Samuel Cox, Director of the Naval History and Heritage Command noted that at least on 6 January, and likely intermittently during 5–7 January, there was "an overcast that hampered both U.S. and Japanese operations. The U.S. ships could not see the Japanese aircraft until they broke through the overcast with very little time to react."

==== High seas slowed landing on 10 January ====
As the results of a small typhoon, around 9–11 January, though its full effects were felt far to the north of the base of the gulf, "By mid-morning (in January 10, the second day of the assault) the 6 to 8-foot surf at the beaches, resulting from the increased swell, had caused landing operations to come to a halt." It was not until the third day of the assault (11 January), that "the swell diminished and conditions improved rapidly to permit continued landing operations." The slight increase in swells and wind might have partly accounted for the number of larger transport ships struck in the Gulf from 9–11 January, as well as the crowding caused by so many large craft at anchor near the base of the Gulf.

=== Kamikaze training ===
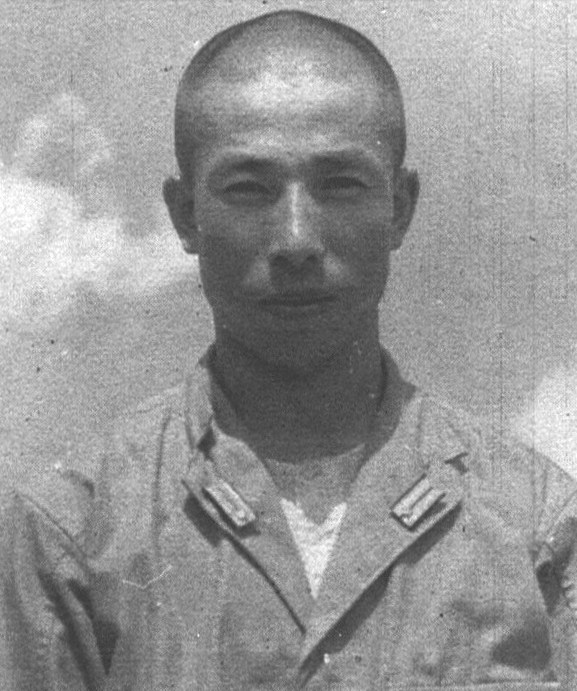
Tadashi Nakajima pre-1945

Commander Tadashi Nakajima, Operations and Training Officer for the 201st Air Group, responsible for the initiation of kamikaze tactics in the Philippines, carefully trained kamikaze pilots as to the angle of dive they chose, the targets they selected, and the methods they used to navigate to Allied ships.

==== Angle of dives ====
There were two basic angle of dives strongly preferred in kamikaze training tactics; a high altitude approach, and a low altitude approach. A high altitude approach could commence at an altitude as high as 6,000–7,000 meters (20,000–23,000 ft), and might begin with an angle of 20 degrees, and then end with a dive angle of 45–55 degrees once reaching 200 meters (660 ft) above a sighted target. These directions were flexible, and required considerable skill to implement. A low altitude approach was ended with a brief climb to 400–500 meters (1,300–1,600 ft) followed by a quick dive. The low altitude approach had the advantage of reduced radar detection and sighting at very low altitudes above the waterline, as Nakajima suggested to his students that a kamikaze might cruise as low as 10–15 meters (33–49 ft) above the waterline, if they had adequate skill to maintain such a consistently low altitude during their approach.

Nakajima cautioned his pilots that in the very high altitude approach, "caution must be taken to insure that the final dive angle is not too steep", for "as the force of gravity increases, a plane is more difficult to pilot, and may go out of control". Once the target is sighted on a low altitude approach, the pilots were advised, "to climb sharply to 400 or 500 meters before going into a steep dive on the target", as the hit should be made on the deck of the target, particularly when the target was the frequently wooden deck of the American escort carriers. However, as noted by Nakajima, this method required skill by the pilot, and though many pilots fully trained for use in the Philippines and at Lingayen had the prerequisite level of skill, many subsequent pilots did not, and this greatly affected the outcome of their efforts. Combined fire by Allied ships also reduced the probability a diving kamikaze would reach their target, but many did at Lingayen, nonetheless due to the difficulty sighting a diving kamikaze.

==== Points of aim ====
Kamikaze pilots carried full fuel tanks to increase the odds of starting fires, and usually carried bombs that would be released at a time to maximize the likelihood they would penetrate the decks of their targets. Against destroyers, other small warships and smaller transports, Nakajima informed his pilots, that "a hit any place between the bridge and the center of the ship is usually fatal". He continued, "small warships and transports, having no deck protection are extremely vulnerable to aerial attack. A single kamikaze plane could sink such vessels with a single hit." At the Battle of Lingayen Gulf, of the vessels sunk or irreparably damaged, 4 of 5, if USS Brooks is counted, or 80% were the aging and smaller, Clemson or Wickes-class destroyers. Of the destroyers sunk, Long was struck by two separate kamikazes, each time near the bridge, Belknap was struck amidships near the second stack, and Brooks was struck port amidships causing fires. Each strike to these heavily damaged destroyers was close or not far from the bridge, the spot suggested by Nakajima's training of kamikaze pilots.

Five escort carriers, a considerable number, were hit at Lingayen, three with considerable damage, but only one, Ommaney Bay, was ever sunk, despite the fact that Nakajima intended his kamikaze pilots to primarily target carriers in order to deprive the Allies of air superiority. Nonetheless, it appears likely the majority of the more damaging hits on escort carriers, evidenced by the table below, were done from kamikazes diving from a high altitude so as to penetrate their decks, as suggested by their training. Nakajima had earlier instructed that carriers should have their elevators damaged by kamikaze dives to reduce their chances of utilizing the planes they had on their hangar decks, but with fewer kamikazes, and with the targets more frequently smaller escort carriers, it seems more high altitude dives targeting decks were used. Around six of the 47 ships struck by kamikazes at Lingayen Gulf were escort carriers, and though only one was sunk, five received serious or extensive damage, indicating they may have been targeted.

=== Vulnerability of minesweepers and destroyers ===
The winds, waves, light rain, and overcast skies would have made smaller craft such as destroyers and minesweepers particularly vulnerable to kamikazes as they would experience less stability in rough seas than a larger ship, affecting their maneuverability while under attack. Their smaller size may have made them a more logical target for kamikazes as well, and overcast skies would have given them less time to spot incoming kamikazes from a distance. Unique to the minesweepers, the uneven bottom and shoals of Lingayen, might have increased the time they required to perform mine sweeping duties against naval mines moored to the bottom, and made their separation from each other and covering ships a greater possibility. Of the 47 ships damaged by enemy aircraft or kamikazes, 16 of 47, over 30% were composed of the relatively smaller ships, destroyers, destroyer escorts, and destroyer/minesweepers.

One might also note, that though the destroyer/minesweepers (DMS) and likely the smaller minesweepers and a few covering ships, often destroyer escorts, entered into the gulf at 04:35 on the morning of 7 January, when the minesweeper Hovey was sunk, the majority of the larger covering battleships and cruisers, did not form up until 06:55 at the mouth of the gulf that day, and did not enter the gulf, until around 7:55, "an hour later", though destroyer and minesweepers were expected to provide their own cover from air attack by remaining close, if possible, during their sweeping duties. Three of the four ships listed as sunk from 3–13 January were destroyer/minesweepers, and a fourth irreparably damaged ship, Belknap, was a Clemson-class destroyer, nearly identical to the size, design and age of the three destroyer/minesweepers sunk.

Although a large variety of ship classes were hit, destroyer/minesweepers may have to a certain extent been targeted in the first week of January because they were smaller, isolated while performing their sweeping duties, less well armed than cruisers and battleships, and by necessity in the front of the convoy, as they had to sweep for mines before the larger ships of the Allied force could advance into the Gulf. Of the five destroyers sunk or irreparably damaged, all were older Clemson or Wickes-class destroyers built in 1918, and possibly more vulnerable to sinking due to their age and older, somewhat less seaworthy design. The naval historian Samuel Eliot Morison noted that at least on 6 January, "the minecraft themselves bore the brunt of the attack this day owing to their distance from supporting ships." He also noted that the "Japanese seemed to pick on Minecraft because they were usually isolated and had no good antiaircraft support." According to data compiled by Tadashi Nakajima, of the 34 ships sunk by kamikazes in the Pacific, at least sixteen were destroyers.

=== Japan knew invasion force's destination ===
Also worthy of consideration, the Japanese had determined early in the battle that the destination of most of the forces among the troop ships was the capital city of Manila, where American prisoners of war were held, making it easier to concentrate their forces on the ships heading for the base of Lingayen Gulf, just 100 miles (160 km) north of the capital. According to Samuel Morison, by 5 January, and certainly by mid-day on 6 January, perhaps the worst for Allied losses from kamikazes, the Japanese high command were already convinced that "Lingayen was the American destination". Though allowing for the considerable cover provided by Allied fighter aircraft, originally as many as 240 Japanese planes from Clark, Nichols, and other airfields on Luzon, within striking distance of Lingayen Gulf, "were committed to the (Lingayen) expeditionary force during the first week of January (1945)". Unlike the primary landing area at Lingayen on Luzon, during the Battles for Leyte Gulf, the two primary landing areas for transports on Leyte Island's Dulag and Tacloban, selected from large stretches of coastline, were far less likely to have been previously known to the Japanese.

Of interest to some, the Clemson-class destroyer/minesweeper USS Southard, which was struck by a kamikaze on 6 January 1945 in Lingayen Gulf but sustained only moderate damage to her deck after fires were extinguished, would later be caught in Typhoon Louise at Okinawa and scuttled while the author Herman Wouk was serving as a lieutenant. Though he was not aboard at the time, Wouk made a brief reference to Southard's kamikaze strike at Lingayen as an event that occurred to a ship in his novel The Caine Mutiny, but used his real experience aboard Southard in the post-surrender Fall 1945 Okinawa typhoon as a basis for the mutiny that was the center of his 1951 Pulitzer prize winner, The Caine Mutiny.

=== Allied defense against kamikazes ===
==== Defense by Allied ships ====
The Allied ships of the invasion force struggled to find an effective defense against diving kamikazes, but realized their options were limited. Rear Admiral Forest B. Royal, stated that "full power and evasive course, combined with rapid and accurate gunfire, proved to be an effective defense against suicide dives." But Vice Admiral Wilkinson, who generally agreed, added that when considering "the high speed of the plane as compared with the relatively slow speed of the ship, even at full power, an evasive course is inconsequential." Admiral Kinkaid summarized the best strategy for defense when he stated that a well-trained and skilled pilot who was intent on crashing his plane, "is almost certain to succeed if unopposed by anti-aircraft fire, regardless of what maneuvers the ship attempts." He then added the primary advantage of maneuvering Allied ships should be "to unmask the maximum number of guns, and to present a narrow target in range since an error in judgement by the pilot is more likely to result in overshooting (the targeted allied ship) than in a deflection error."

==== Defense by Allied aircraft ====
In early 1945, U.S. Navy aviator Commander John Thach, already famous for developing effective aerial tactics against the Japanese such as the Thach Weave, developed a defensive strategy against kamikazes called the "big blue blanket" to establish Allied air supremacy well away from the carrier force. This method recommended combat air patrols (CAP) that were larger and operated further from the carriers than before, a line of picket destroyers and destroyer escorts at least 80 km (50 mi) from the main body of the fleet to provide earlier radar interception and improved coordination between fighter direction officers on carriers. This plan also called for around-the-clock fighter patrols over Allied fleets, though the U.S. Navy had cut back training of fighter pilots so there were not enough Navy pilots available to counter the kamikaze threat. A final element included intensive fighter sweeps over Japanese airfields, and bombing of Japanese runways, using delayed-action bombs to make repairs more difficult. As effective as these methods could be, they had limitations, particularly considering the somewhat limited ability of radar to detect incoming enemy planes, the use of armor on kamikazes, the confusing tactics they used to avoid anti-aircraft fire, and the difficulty in shooting down kamikazes once their dive began.

One could speculate that two changes might have reduced the heavy losses to naval vessels from kamikaze and traditional Japanese aircraft attacks from 3–13 January. Earlier and more extensive attempts to knock out Japanese planes on Luzon prior to 6 January would have been instrumental in reducing losses by kamikazes during the critical time period from 6–13 January, though this may have required Halsey's fast carriers to have operated closer to the mouth of the Gulf. Halsey and senior Naval Staff had expected that more Japanese planes were to be routed from Formosa during the invasion which is likely why they stationed well north of the Gulf, but this did not prove to be the case, so the fast carrier group might have stationed closer to the mouth of the gulf. Another factor that might have led to less damage to American naval vessels could have been the use of more fire support ships, such as large cruisers and battleships as screening ships, rather than have them spend much of their time bombarding the beaches, which housed very little resistance, though this was not known by 5 January, or not acted upon by naval command. The use of large battleships and cruisers as screening ships was also problematic as they may have lacked the speed of destroyers, and their fire as screening ships may have caused too many incidents of friendly fire.

== Invasion ships sunk and damaged at Lingayen ==
=== Approach and return route of invading ships ===
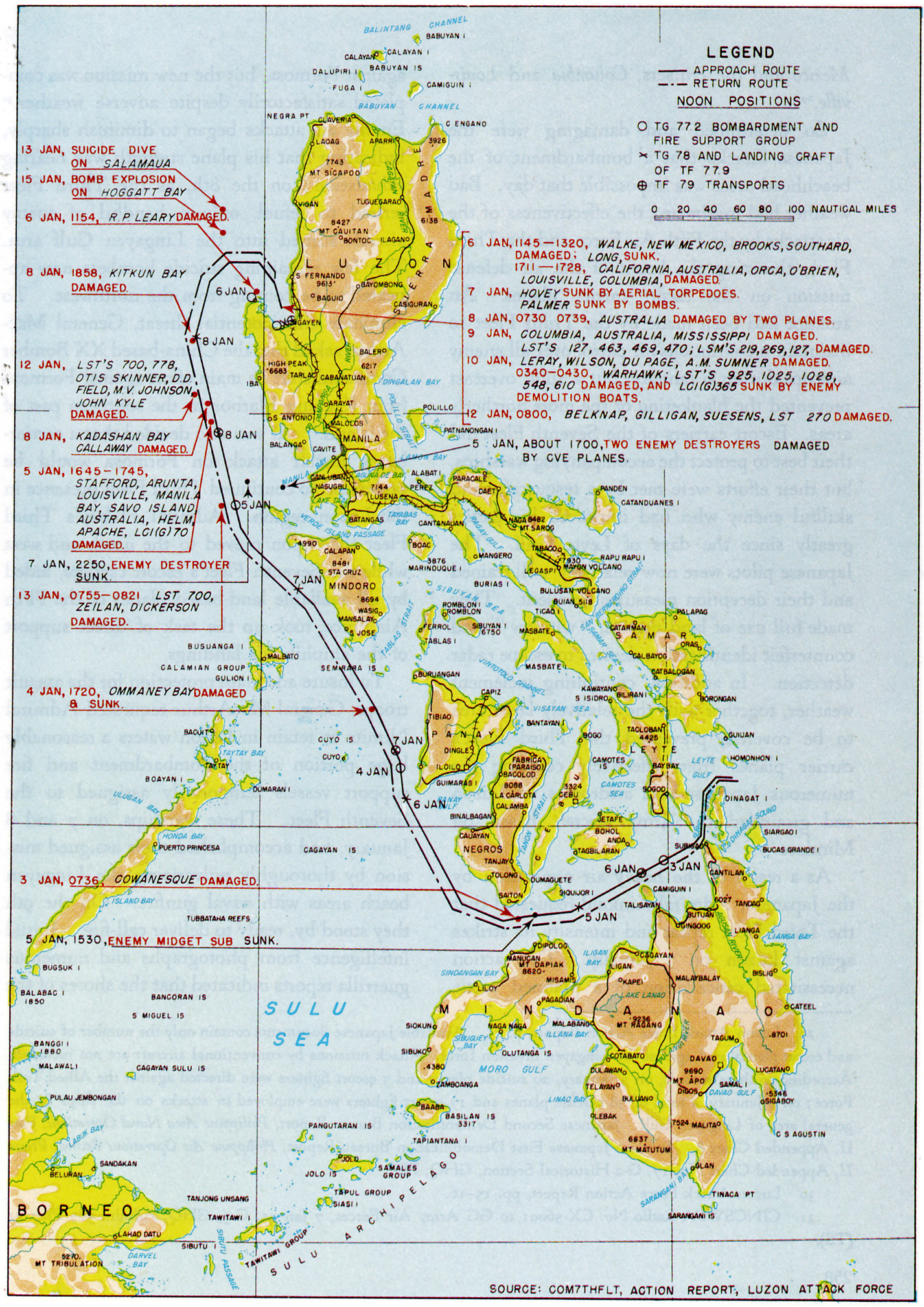
Approach of U.S. naval forces to Lingayen Gulf with dates they were damaged

Shown at left is the approach route indicated by a solid line, and the return route, indicated by a dotted line, of the roughly 750 ships of the Allied invasion force sent to Lingayen Gulf in early January 1945. Red arrows point to the location, and associated text identifies the name of each Japanese or Allied ship as it was struck, including the date and time. A very few were damaged by attacks unrelated to kamikaze dives.

The arrow near the base of the gulf, with associated text at the top and to the right of the island of Luzon, indicates the large number of ships damaged within the gulf, after 6 January. Following is a table of the Allied naval vessels damaged and sunk almost exclusively by kamikaze strikes between 3–13 January 1945 at the Battle of Lingayen Gulf. Those ships highlighted in blue can be selected and their accompanying pages searched for Philippines, or Lingayen to find the exact manner in which they were attacked by enemy aircraft, most often kamikazes. At least two of the ships were not damaged by a kamikaze, the destroyer/minesweeper Palmer which was sunk by two bombs from an enemy dive bomber, and Hovey which was sunk by an aerial torpedo, but was simultaneously grazed by a kamikaze which went overboard. Of the 47 ships with damage listed in the table below, nearly all could be attributed to the strikes or collateral damage of kamikaze aircraft, including friendly fire against an adjacent diving kamikaze. A few ships were damaged by kamikaze boats, but these are not listed below.

Nearly all the ships were American naval vessels as designated by USS before their name, except those designated by HMAS for ships in the Royal Australian Navy, or SS for commercial ships, usually operated by the United States' Merchant Mariners. Those ships struck more than once have a number in parentheses to the right of the name of the ship, and include the date of each strike and a figure for the number wounded or killed by each strike. An asterisk and pink background indicates a ship that was sunk, or was damaged beyond repair, which were usually towed. Not included in this tally are all of the ships damaged by suicide boats or Shinyo which included USS War Hawk, a transport ship that carried landing craft to move troops and four landing craft mechanized (LCMs) used to move heavy equipment. A number of tank landing ships (LSTs), tank transports, and infantry landing craft (LCIs), were also damaged by Japanese kamikaze boats. Damaged in the early morning hours of 10 January 1945, around 400, in addition to War Hawk were the tank landing ships USS LSTs LST-548, LST-610, LST-925, LST-1025, LST-1028, and the troop landing craft USS LCI(M)-974 and LCI(G)-365, the only one of these sunk.

Abandoned ships included Ommaney Bay, Long, Brooks (partly abandoned), Hovey, Palmer, LCI(G)-365, and LCI(M)-974. Time is in naval military time.

Naval vessels damaged and sunk by Japanese forces at Lingayen Gulf, almost exclusively kamikazes, 3–13 Jan 1945
| Day | Time | Ship | Type | Damage | Cause | Killed | Wounded |
| 3 January 1945 | 07:28 | USS Cowanesque | Transport oiler | Minor | kamikaze | 2 | 1 |
| 3 January 1945 | 17:12 | *USS Ommaney Bay | Escort carrier | Sunk (Scuttled) | P1Y "Frances" kamikaze bomber, bombs through two decks | 93 | 65 |
| 5 January 1945 | 16:51 | USS Helm | Destroyer | Minor | kamikaze, aftermast, searchlight | 0 | 6 |
| 5 January 1945 | 17:06 | USS Louisville (1) | Heavy cruiser | Moderate | kamikaze, 8-inch gun | 1 | 59 |
| 5 January 1945 | 17:35 | HMAS Australia (1) | Heavy cruiser | Minor | kamikaze, hit gun crews portside amidships | 30 | 46 |
| 5 January 1945 | 17:35 | HMAS Arunta | Destroyer | Minor | Near miss kamikaze | 2 | 4 |
| 5 January 1945 | 17:39 | USS Apache | Fleet tug | Minor | kamikaze, port bow, radar mast | 0 | 3 |
| 5 January 1945 | 17:40 | USS LCI-(G)-70 | Small troop carrier | Moderate | kamikaze | 6 | 9 |
| 5 January 1945 | 17:45 | USS Manila Bay | Escort carrier | Moderate | Steep kamikaze hit flight deck near but abaft bridge, explosion, fires | 32 | 56 |
| 5 January 1945 | 17:50 | USS Savo Island | Escort carrier | Negligible | kamikaze hit radar antenna | 0 | 0 |
| 6 January 1945 | 11:05 | USS Allen M. Sumner | Destroyer | Extensive | kamikaze hit aft deckhouse, torpedoes | 14 | 29 |
| 6 January 1945 | 11:45 | USS Richard P. Leary | Destroyer | Minor | kamikaze near miss, brushed 5-inch guns | 0 | 1 |
| 6 January 1945 | 11:59 | USS New Mexico | Battleship | Minor | kamikaze hit port bridge | 30 | 87 |
| 6 January 1945 | 12:01 | USS Walke | Destroyer escort | Extensive | kamikaze hit port bridge | 13 | 34 |
| 6 January 1945 | 12:15 | *USS Long | Destroyer/minesweeper | Sunk | Two kamikaze hits, near bridge | 1 | 35 |
| 6 January 1945 | 12:52 | *USS Brooks | Destroyer transport | Extensive | kamikaze midship hit fires, abandoned | 3 | 11 |
| 6 January 1945 | 14:24 | USS Columbia | Light cruiser | Minor | kamikaze splashed very close | 0 | 1 |
| 6 January 1945 | 14:27 | USS O'Brien | Destroyer | Moderate | 'kamikaze dive hit fantail | 0 | 0 |
| 6 January 1945 | 14:37 | USS Minneapolis | Heavy cruiser | Minor | Collateral kamikaze (?) | 0 | 2 |
| 6 January 1945 | 15:45 | USS Orca | Oiler transport | Minor | kamikaze near miss, wreckage hit | 0 | 4 |
| 6 January 1945 | 17:20 | USS California | Battleship | Minor | low kamikaze hit deck at mainmast, friendly fire | 45 | 151 |
| 6 January 1945 | 17:20 | USS Newcomb | Destroyer | Minor | hit by friendly fire at kamikaze w/40 mm, and 5-inch proximity shells | 2 | 15 |
| 6 January 1945 | 17:29 | USS Columbia (2) | Light cruiser | Extensive | kamikaze hit, bomb through three decks | 13 | 44 |
| 6 January 1945 | 17:30 | USS Louisville (2) | Heavy cruiser | Extensive | kamikaze hit starboard signal bridge | 32 | 56 |
| 6 January 1945 | 17:32 | USS Southard | Destroyer/minesweeper | Moderate | kamikaze hit portside deck causing deck hole near midship, above No.2 fireroom with brief fire | 0 | 6 |
| 6 January 1945 | 17:34 | HMAS Australia (2) | Heavy cruiser | Serious | kamikaze hit starboard side | 14 | 26 |
| 7 January 1945 | 04:30 | *USS Hovey | Destroyer/minesweeper | Sunk | First kamikaze splashed, second plane launched aerial torpedo hitting aft engine room | 46 | 3 |
| 7 January 1945 | 18:35 | *USS Palmer | Destroyer/minesweeper | Sunk | Two aerial bombs to midship, near water line, then plane dove | 28 | 38 |
| 8 January 1945 | 05:45 | USS LST-912 | Tank landing ship | Minor | "Val" kamikaze skidded into her | 4 | 3 |
| 8 January 1945 | 07:20 | HMAS Australia (3) | Heavy cruiser | Minor | kamikaze skidded into her | 0 | 0 |
| 8 January 1945 | 07:39 | HMAS Australia (4) | Heavy cruiser | Extensive | kamikaze hit side, bomb blew | 0 | 0 |
| 8 January 1945 | 07:51 | USS Kadashan Bay | Escort carrier | Serious | kamikaze with bombs hit waterline | 0 | 3 |
| 8 January 1945 | 07:55 | USS Callaway | Large attack transport | Minor | kamikaze starboard grazed bridge, hit above engine room, near stack, with fires, flaming debris | 29 | 22 |
| 8 January 1945 | 18:57 | USS Kitkun Bay | Escort carrier | Extensive | kamikaze high dive hit port partly under waterline, blew hole, flooding | 17 | 36 |
| 8 January 1945 | 19:03 | HMAS Westralia | Large troop carrier | Minor | kamikaze hit astern | 0 | 0 |
| 9 January 1945 | 07:00 | USS Hodges | Destroyer escort | Minor | kamikaze near miss, foremast, antennas | 0 | 0 |
| 9 January 1945 | 07:45 | USS Columbia (3) | Light cruiser | Serious | kamikaze hit, bomb blew | 24 | 68 |
| 9 January 1945 | 13:02 | USS Mississippi | Battleship | Minor | kamikaze hit forward below bridge, hit gun, w/blast, and fragment damage, then went over side | 23 | 63 |
| 9 January 1945 | 13:11 | HMAS Australia (5) | Heavy cruiser | Minor | kamikaze missed bridge, hit forward mast strut, exhaust, radar, wireless | 0 | 0 |
| 10 January 1945 | 17:10 | USS Le Ray Wilson | Destroyer escort | Extensive | lit low angle two-engine kamikaze hit stack and torpedoes | 6 | 7 |
| 10 January 1945 | 19:15 | USS DuPage | Large attack transport | Minor | lit kamikaze struck bridge, went aft, with gas fires | 32 | 157 |
| 12 January 1945 | 16:58 | USS Gilligan | Destroyer escort | Extensive | kamikaze "Betty" bomber blew, lit torpedoes | 12 | 13 |
| 12 January 1945 | 17:27 | USS Richard W. Suesens | Destroyer escort | Slight | fantail passed over wrecked kamikaze | 0 | 11 |
| 12 January 1945 | 07:53 | *USS Belknap | Destroyer transport | Extensive | lit kamikaze hit second stack, bomb blew | 38 | 49 |
| 12 January 1945 | 08:15 | USS LST-700 (1) | Tank landing ship | Extensive | kamikaze skidded in, w/impact | 0 | 6 |
| 12 January 1945 | 12:50 | SS Otis Skinner | Liberty ship | Extensive | kamikaze through two decks, explosion | 0 | 0 |
| 12 January 1945 | 18:30 | SS Kyle V. Johnson | Liberty ship | Extensive | kamikaze hit deck, with fire | 129 | 0 |
| 12 January 1945 | 18:30 | USS LST-778 | Tank landing ship | None | kamikaze splashed close | 0 | 0 |
| 12 January 1945 | 18:30 | SS David Dudley Field | Liberty ship | Minor | kamikaze near miss, hit engine room | 0 | 0 |
| 12 January 1945 | 18:30 | SS Edward N. Wescott | Liberty ship | Substantial | kamikaze near miss, debris hit | 0 | 13 |
| 13 January 1945 | 18:10 | USS LST-700 (2) | Tank landing ship | Extensive | low kamikaze struck weather deck | 2 | 2 |
| 13 January 1945 | 18:21 | USS Zeilin (APA-3) | Large attack transport | Extensive | kamikaze hit starboard, its engine pierced deck, bulkhead, w/fires | 8 | 32 |
| 13 January 1945 | 08:58 | USS Salamaua | Escort carrier | Extensive | steep kamikaze hit flight deck, bombs through two decks, blew side | 15 | 88 |
| Total | | | | | | 746 | 1,365 |

== Commemoration ==
On 9 January 2008, Gov. Amado Espino Jr. and Vice Gov. Marlyn Primicias-Agabas of Pangasinan institutionalized the commemoration to honor the war veterans. The resolution named 9 January as Pangasinan Veterans' Day. In the 63rd anniversary commemoration of the Lingayen Gulf Landing, President Fidel Ramos appealed to U.S. President George W. Bush for 24,000 surviving war veterans, to pass two legislative bills pending since 1968 at the US House of Representatives – the Filipino Veterans' Equity Act of 2006 and the Filipino Veterans' Equity of 2005 sponsored by former Senator Daniel Inouye.

== See also ==
- For a more detailed description of the land battle for Luzon, refer to Battle of Luzon
- Battle of Manila (1945)
- Battle of Bataan
- List of Allied vessels struck by Japanese special attack weapons, includes last coordinates
