= William Derby =

English artist (1786–1847)

William Derby (1786–1847) was an English portraitist, miniature painter and copyist.

== Life ==
Derby was born in Birmingham on 10 January 1786, where he was taught drawing by Joseph Barber. In 1808 he moved to London, where he began his career by making the reduced drawings for the plates of the Stafford Gallery, a set of engravings of the paintings in the Marquess of Stafford's collection, published in four volumes in 1818 with text by William Young Ottley and Peltro William Tomkins.

He then pursued a career as portrait and miniature painter, occasionally making watercolour copies of notable pictures, until 1825, when he succeeded William Hilton, R.A., in making the drawings for Lodge's Portraits of Illustrious Personages of Great Britain, completed in 1834. This involved copying paintings in collections throughout the country, and in the course of his work Derby obtained many useful introductions. Among these new patrons was the Earl of Derby, whose portrait he painted, and who commissioned him to make watercolours after the portraits of his ancestors, from the reign of Henry VII onwards, which existed in various collections.

In 1838 a severe attack of paralysis deprived him of speech and the use of one side of his body, but in a few months he had recovered sufficiently to continue his work, which he did with the assistance of his son, Alfred Thomas Derby.

In an obituary of Derby, the sculptor Peter Hollins singled out his copy of Landseer's Return from the Highlands, as one of his best works:

[Landseer's] picture is among the choicest productions of this highly-gifted master. The copy is also a gem: the elegance of the drawing, the deep sentiment of the work, and the various textures and local colours, are given with a fidelity and beauty truly astonishing.

Hollins added:

It has been a great advantage to the world of art, when fine original pictures have been inaccessible to the engraver, to have copies made by an artist of the powers possessed by Mr. Derby, who, while he attended with the greatest care to the most minute accessories, caught the spirit and character of each particular master he undertook to imitate. As an artist, he possessed powers of a great range in oil and water-colour painting, as is abundantly attested by his numerous portraits, miniatures, vigorous original subjects of still life, and his exquisite water-colour copies, over which he threw a peculiar charm.

A portrait in oils by Derby, Lady Adelaide Georgiana Fitzclarence as a Child is at Petworth House.

Between 1811 and 1842 he exhibited 49 works at the Royal Academy, 16 at the British Institution and 15 at the Society of British Artists. They included portraits in oil, still lifes, and miniatures.

He died in Osnaburgh Street, London, on 1 January 1847, survived by his widow, Lucy, and eight children. He was buried in a family grave close to the upper entrance of the western side of Highgate Cemetery. His eldest son, Alfred Thomas Derby and his son-in-law Henry Room were also buried there.

== Gallery ==
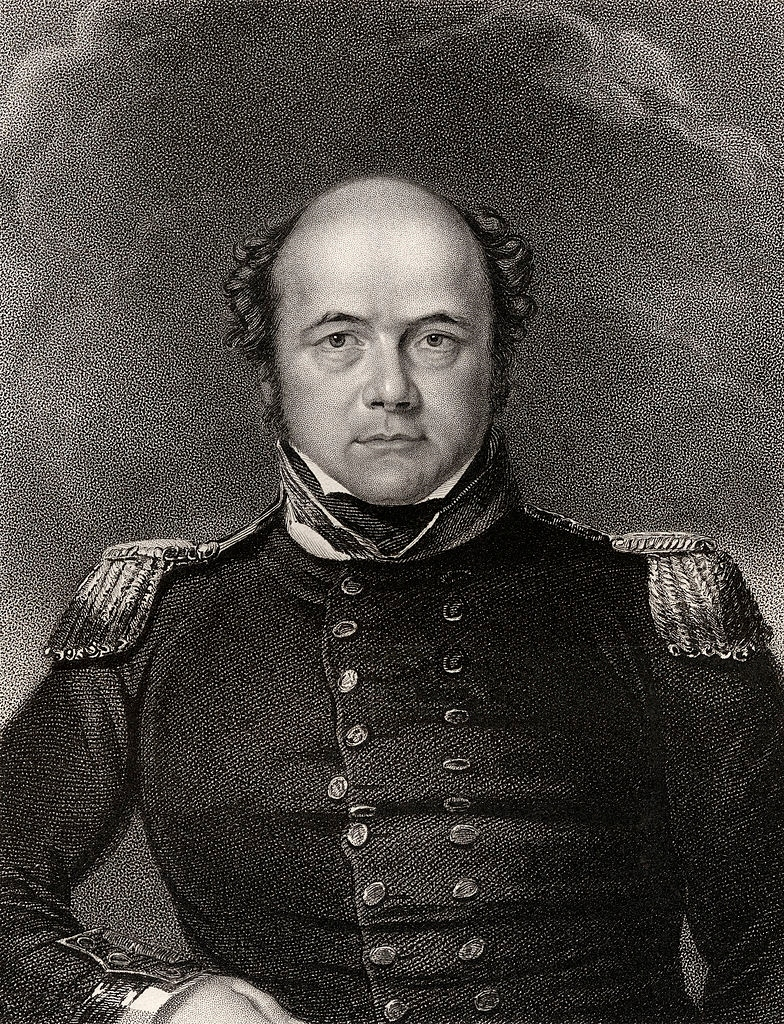
John Franklin, portrait by Derby engraved by James Thomson.

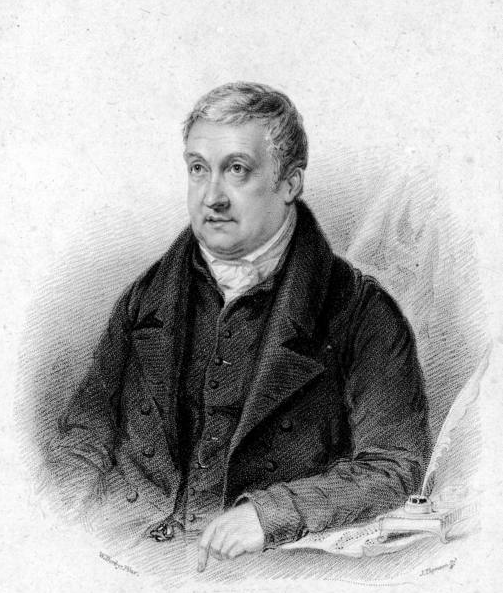
William Crotch, portrait by Derby engraved by Thomson, 1822

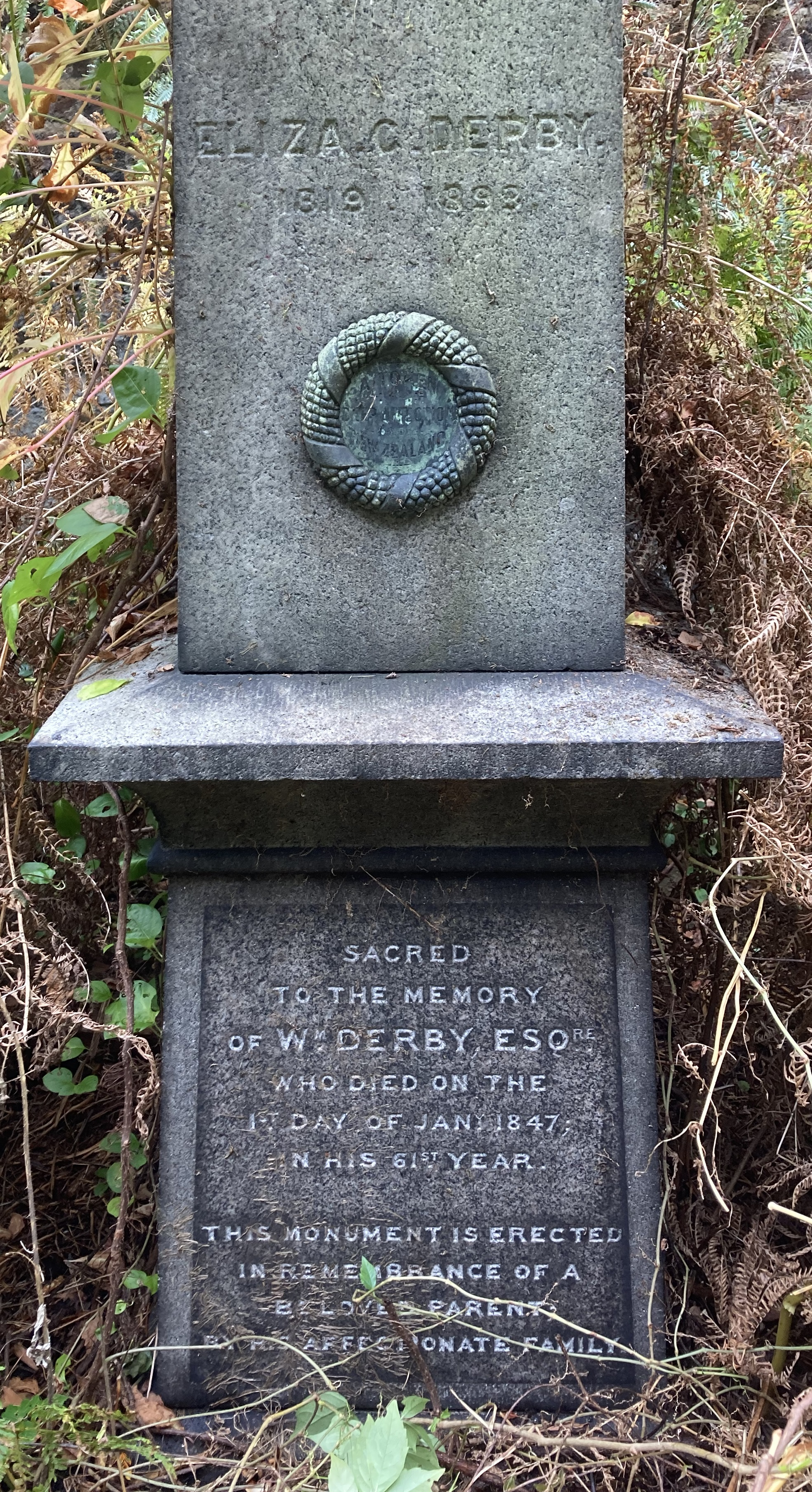
Grave of William Derby in Highgate Cemetery

== Sources ==
- This article incorporates text from a publication now in the public domain: Graves, Robert Edmund (1888). "Derby, William". In Stephen, Leslie (ed.). Dictionary of National Biography. Vol. 15. London: Smith, Elder & Co.
- Lord and Lady Derby., a portrait after Vandyke engraved by John Henry Robinson for Fisher's Drawing Room Scrap Book, 1833 with a poetical illustration by Letitia Elizabeth Landon.
