= Derby High School =

Derby High School could refer to several high schools:

== England ==
- Derby High School, Bury in Greater Manchester
- Derby High School, Derbyshire in Derby

== United States ==
- Derby High School (Connecticut) in Derby, Connecticut
- Derby High School (Kansas) in Derby, Kansas
