= USS LST-548 =

1944 LST-542-class tank landing ship

History

United States
- Name: USS LST-548
- Builder: Missouri Valley Bridge and Iron Company, Evansville, Indiana
- Laid down: 30 December 1943
- Launched: 22 February 1944
- Sponsored by: Mrs. Robert L. Koch
- Commissioned: 3 April 1944
- Decommissioned: 15 February 1946
- In service: In non-commissioned service with Military Sea Transportation Service as USNS LST-548 (T-LST-548) from 31 March 1952
- Stricken: 1 January 1960
- Honors and awards: Two battle stars for World War II
- Fate: Sold for scrapping 1960

General characteristics
- Class & type: LST-542-class tank landing ship
- Displacement: 1,490 long tons (1,514 t) light; 4,080 long tons (4,145 t) full
- Length: 328 ft (100 m)
- Beam: 50 ft (15 m)
- Draft: Unloaded 2 ft 4 in (0.71 m) bow; 7 ft 6 in (2.29 m) stern; Full load: 8 ft 2 in (2.49 m) forward; 14 ft 1 in (4.29 m) aft
- Installed power: 1,800 horsepower (1.34 megawatts)
- Propulsion: Two 900-horsepower (0.67-megawatt) General Motors 12-567 diesel engines, two shafts, twin rudders
- Speed: 12 knots (22 km/h; 14 mph)
- Boats & landing craft carried: 2 x LCVPs
- Troops: 16 officers and 147 enlisted men
- Complement: 7 officers, 104 enlisted men
- Armament: 2 × twin 40 mm gun mounts; 4 × single 40-millimeter gun mounts; 12 × 20 mm guns

USS LST-548 was a United States Navy LST-542-class tank landing ship in commission from 1944 to 1946. She also served in a non-commissioned status with the Military Sea Transportation Service as USNS LST-548 (T-LST-548) from 1952.

== Construction and commissioning ==
LST-548 was laid down on 30 December 1943 at Evansville, Indiana, by the Missouri Valley Bridge and Iron Company. She was launched on 22 February 1944, sponsored by Mrs. Robert L. Koch, and commissioned on 3 April 1944.

== Service history ==
=== In commissioned service ===
During World War II, LST-548 initially was assigned to the European Theater of Operations. She participated in Operation Overlord, the invasion of Normandy, in June 1944. LST-548 subsequently was assigned to the Pacific Theater of Operations, where she took part in the assault on and occupation of Okinawa Gunto in June 1945.

Following the war, LST-548 performed occupation duty in the Far East until early February 1946, when she returned to the United States.

LST-548 was decommissioned on 15 February 1946.

=== Non-commissioned service in Military Sea Transportation Service ===
On 31 March 1952, LST-548 was transferred to the Military Sea Transportation Service, where she served in a non-commissioned status as USNS LST-548 (T-LST-548).

== Final disposition ==
USNS LST-548 was stricken from the Navy List on 1 January 1960. She was sold later that year for $56,000 USD to Coal Export Corporation for scrapping in Japan.

== Honors and awards ==
LST-548 earned two battle stars for World War II service.
