= Derby (repair shops) =

Railroad repair shop in Maine

Coordinates: 45°13′52.03″N 68°58′13.03″W

Derby (formerly known as Milo Junction) is the name of railroad repair facilities in Milo, Maine. In 1905, it was described by the Bangor Daily Commercial as being the second-largest repair shop in New England, as built by the Bangor & Aroostook Railroad.
