= Alfred Thomas Derby =

English painter (1821–1873)

Alfred Thomas Derby (1821–1873) was an English painter.

== Life ==
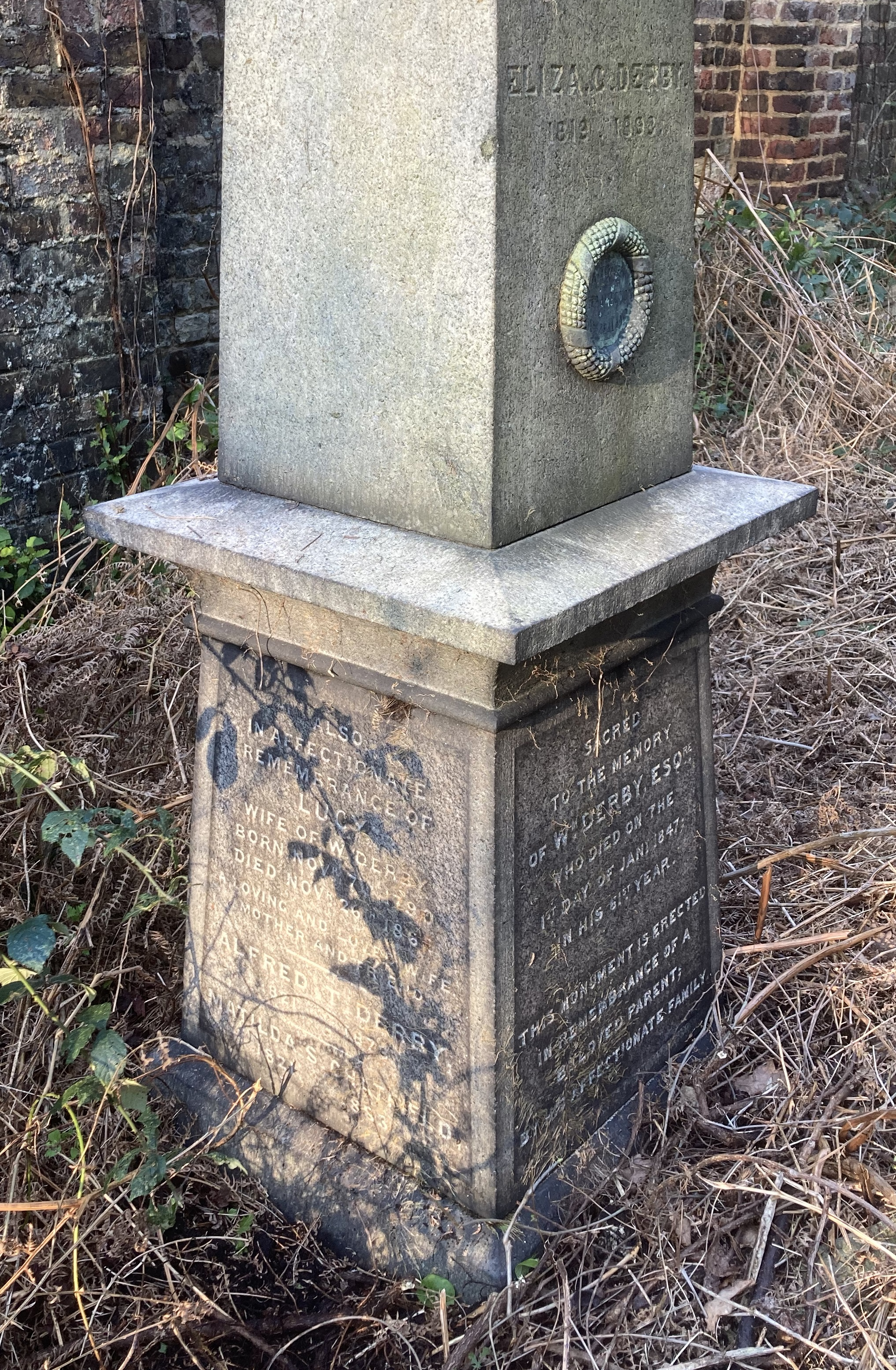
Grave of Alfred Thomas Derby in Highgate Cemetery

The eldest son of William Derby, he was born in London on 21 January 1821. He was educated at Mr. Wyand's school on Hampstead Road, where among his school-fellows were Henry Thomas Buckle, Frederick and Edward Angelo Goodall, and Percy St. John. After studying in the schools of the Royal Academy, he painted portraits and scenes from the novels of Sir Walter Scott. Later the failing health of his father made it necessary that he should assist him in his watercolour copies from the works of Edwin Landseer and others.

== Works ==
Derby's works, mainly portraits and figure subjects, appeared from time to time at the Royal Academy and other exhibitions in London from 1839 to 1872; they went to private collections in the United Kingdom and in America. In later life he confined his art to watercolours and produced many drawings, sometimes original works, but mostly copies from the paintings of well-known masters, such as Thomas Webster's Slide, and Thomas Gainsborough's portrait of Mrs. Graham in the National Gallery of Scotland.

== Death ==
After two years of ill-health he died 19 April 1873 and was buried in the Derby family grave in Highgate Cemetery with his father and mother, Lucy.

He left a small collection of highly finished drawings from portraits, which was sold at Christie's 23 February 1874.
