= Henry McAlpin =

Scottish master builder and architect

- Born: 1777; Stirling, Scotland
- Died: 1851 (aged 73–74)
- Resting place: Laurel Grove Cemetery

Henry McAlpin (1777–1851) was a Scottish master builder and architect who was prominent in the early 19th century.

== Early life ==
McAlpin was born in 1777 in Stirling, Scotland. He emigrated to Charleston, South Carolina, in 1804. He remained there for eight years, before moving south to Georgia.

== Career ==
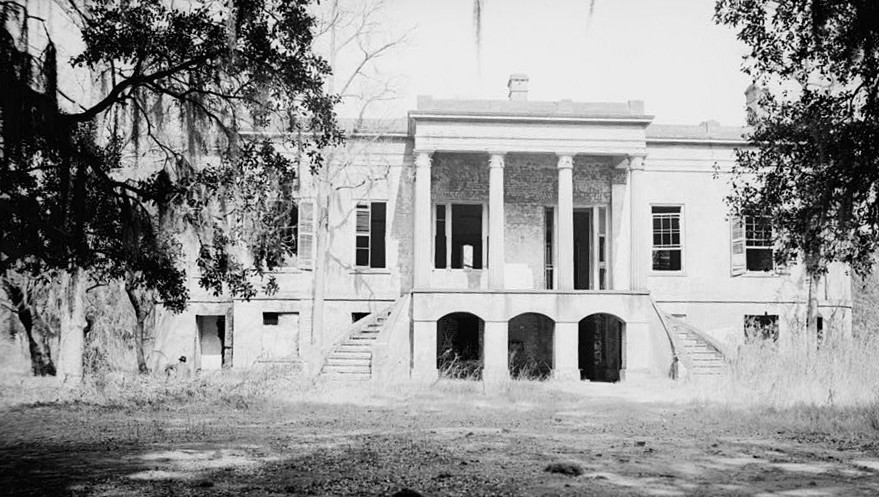
Hermitage plantation house, pictured shortly before its demolition in 1934

McAlpin began working with William I. Scott, who helped him acquire property. Around 1825, he built a mansion at the Hermitage Plantation in Savannah, Georgia, located around 3 miles (4.8 km) north of the city, replacing the original plantation house. Sources differ as to who was its architect: some say William Jay; others claim it was Charles B. Cluskey. The plantation was around 220 acres (89 ha) in size at the time, and McAlpin purchased the property from Jean de Bérard-Moquet-Montalet, Chevalier Marquise de Montalent (who had purchased it from Patrick Mackay). The mansion was located at the end of a long driveway lined on either side by oak trees. The plantation was run by 65 slaves.

McAlpin expanded the property to cover 600 acres (240 ha) and increased its number of slaves by over one hundred. With the help of Scott, McAlpin purchased the 275-acre (111 ha) "The Glebe" lands adjoining The Hermitage.

Rice was grown at the plantation, but the Hermitage was mostly an industrial site, with steam-powered saw and planing mills, a rice barrel factory. It also contained Savannah's largest brickworks, which produced more than 60 million bricks. Many of its "Savannah Grey" bricks were used to build Savannah's early homes. Around 1820, McAlpin built a railroad to move the bricks around the plantation.

== Personal life ==
McAlpin became a United States citizen in 1818. The following year, he married for a second time, this time to Ellen McInnis, of Charleston, with whom he had six children: two daughters and four sons. She died in 1831, aged 31 or 32.

He was president of the Saint Andrew's Society between 1840 and his death, but was involved with the organisation for many years previously. He was also a director of the Central Railroad and Banking Company.

== Death ==
McAlpin died of heart disease in 1851, aged 73 or 74. He was initially buried at the plantation, but his body was later removed to Savannah's Laurel Grove Cemetery. He was interred beside his second wife.
