= Moxley Sorrel =

Confederate States Army officer and memoirist (1838–1901)

G. Moxley Sorrel
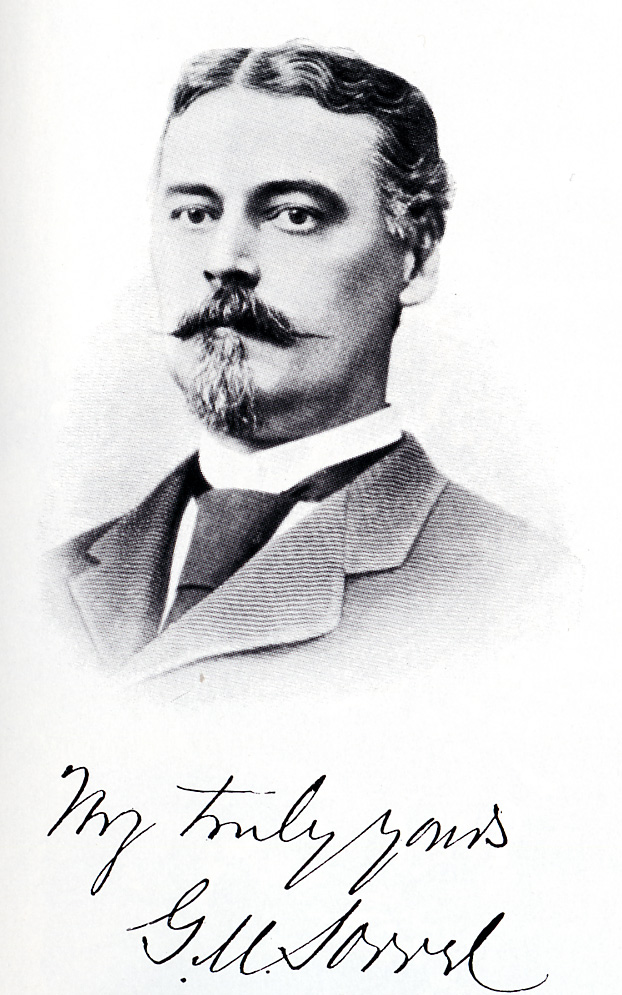
- Born: February 23, 1838; Savannah, Georgia, U.S.
- Died: August 10, 1901 (aged 63) Roanoke, Virginia, U.S.
- Buried: Laurel Grove Cemetery; Savannah, Georgia, U.S.
- Allegiance: Confederate States
- Branch: Army
- Service years: 1861–1865
- Rank: Brigadier-General
- Commands: Sorrel's Brigade
- Battles: American Civil War; Battle of First Manassas; Peninsula campaign; Battle of Second Manassas; Battle of Sharpsburg (WIA); Battle of Fredericksburg; Battle of Gettysburg; Battle of Chickamauga; Battle of the Wilderness; Battle of Spotsylvania; Battle of Cold Harbor; Siege of Petersburg
- Other work: Businessman, memoirist

Gilbert Moxley Sorrel (February 23, 1838 – August 10, 1901) was a senior officer of the Confederate States Army who commanded infantry in the Eastern Theater of the American Civil War. A businessman in Savannah, Georgia, and memoirist after the civil war, Sorrel served on the board of the Georgia Historical Society.

== Early life ==
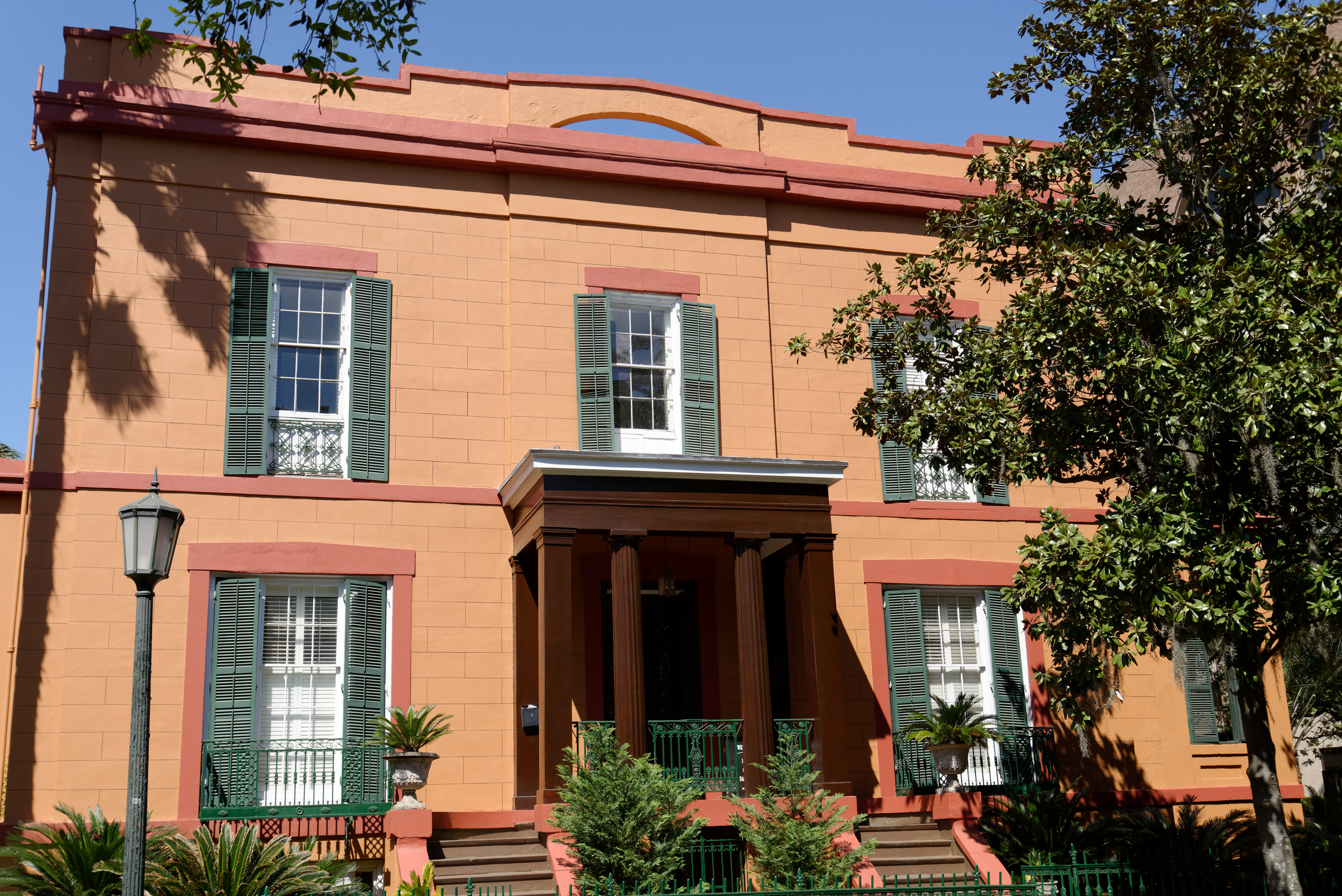
Sorrel's boyhood home

Sorrel was born in Savannah, Georgia, the son of one of the wealthiest men in the city, Francis Sorrel. He was the brother-in-law of William W. Mackall, who was a Confederate general and chief of staff to Braxton Bragg.

The Sorrel's boyhood home in Savannah is one of the finest examples of Greek Revival architecture in the United States. Designed in 1836 by Charles Clusky, it was one of the first two houses in Georgia to be designated a state landmark. The house is open to the public for tours.

== American Civil War ==
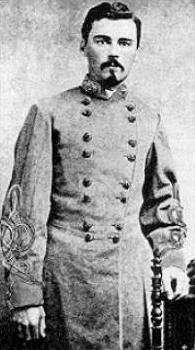
Sorrel in uniform, 1862

In 1861, Moxley left his job as a Savannah bank clerk, taking part in the Confederate capture of Fort Pulaski as a private in the Georgia Hussars. With letters of introduction from Colonel Jordan, from Gen. P.G.T. Beauregard's staff, and a friend of his father's, he reported to Brig. Gen. James Longstreet at Manassas, Virginia, on July 21, 1861, and began serving as a volunteer aide-de-camp. Longstreet wrote that his young aide "came into the battle as gaily as a beau, and seemed to receive orders which threw him into more exposed positions with particular delight."

On September 11, 1861, Sorrel received his commission as captain and was assigned as General Longstreet's adjutant-general. He was promoted to major on June 24, 1862, and to lieutenant colonel on June 18, 1863. He served under Longstreet until October 1864, when he was appointed brigadier general. Sorrel then commanded Sorrel's Brigade of Maj. Gen. William Mahone's division at Petersburg and Hatcher's Run, and was wounded in both battles.

Richard L. DiNardo wrote: "Even Longstreet's most virulent critics have conceded that he put together the best staff employed by any commander, and that his de facto chief of staff, Lieutenant Colonel Moxley Sorrel, was the best staff officer in the Confederacy."

== Later life ==
After the Civil War, Sorrel returned to Savannah, worked as an executive for the Ocean Steamship Company, and served on the board of the Georgia Historical Society. On November 14, 1867, he married Kate Amelie DuBignon in Woodville, Baldwin County, Georgia. Ms. DuBignon, the daughter of Charles and Ann Virginia Grantland DuBignon, was born Jan., 1846 in Milledgeville, Baldwin County, Georgia and died December 26, 1919, in Warrenton, Fauquier County, Virginia.

When Robert E. Lee visited Savannah months before his death in 1870, Sorrel led the Savannah delegation, greeted General Lee at the train station, and escorted him around the city. Sorrel died in Roanoke, Virginia, and is buried in Laurel Grove Cemetery, Savannah.

== In popular culture ==
Sorrel appears in Michael Shaara's Pulitzer Prize-winning novel The Killer Angels (1974). In its film adaptation, Gettysburg (1993), Sorrel is portrayed by Kieran Mulroney. In Harry Turtledove's alternate-history novel How Few Remain (1997), Sorrel serves as Chief-of-Staff for Confederate President James Longstreet.

== Selected works ==
Sorrel's memoir, Recollections of a Confederate Staff Officer, was published posthumously, in 1905. Historian Douglas Southall Freeman deemed Sorrel's book one of the best accounts of the personalities of the major players in the Confederacy, characterized by "a hundred touches of humor and revealing strokes of swift characterization."

== See also ==
- List of Confederate States Army generals
