= Alida Fowlkes =

American preservationist

- Born: June 8, 1908
- Died: January 21, 1985 (aged 76)
- Occupation: Preservationist

Alida "Harper" Fowlkes (June 8, 1908 – January 21, 1985) was an American preservationist and antiques dealer. She restored ten homes in Savannah, Georgia, where the Harper Fowlkes House is now named for her. The city's Alida Hotel is also named for her.

== Early life ==
Aged five, Fowlkes contracted typhoid fever and spent much of her childhood confined to bed. She also underwent several surgeries for tuberculosis. It is believed she spent this time drawing, watercoloring and journaling.

She graduated from New Sullins College in Virginia in 1927.

== Career ==
Upon graduating, Fowlkes returned to her home in Savannah, where she opened a small studio called Variety Shop in her parents' home.

She went on to study at the University of Georgia, where she opened another shop, named Loom and Art.

During the 1930 and 1940s, she owned The Georgian Tea Room, a restaurant located in the basement of the Olde Pink House.

She restored ten houses in Savannah, including 122 West Oglethorpe Avenue, which was built in 1819.

== Personal life ==
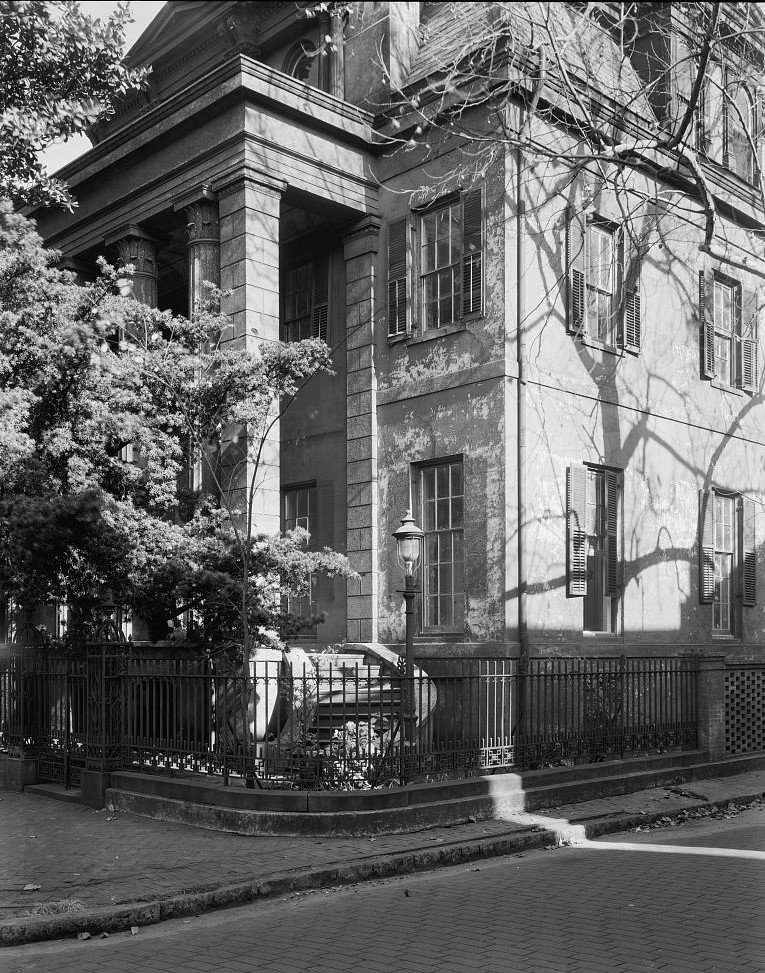
The Harper Fowlkes House

Fowlkes and her mother moved to 230 Barnard Street, a home built in 1844, on New Year's Eve 1939. She lived there for 45 years. Located in Savannah's Orleans Square, it is now named the Harper Fowlkes House. She married Hunter McGregor Fowlkes, a native of Rockingham, North Carolina. He died of natural causes in 1949.

In 1978, she also had a home in Grimbles Point, Georgia.

== Death ==
Fowlkes died in 1985, aged 76. She was interred in Savannah's Bonaventure Cemetery, beside her husband. She left today's Harper Fowlkes House to the Society of the Cincinnati in the State of Georgia, for it to be used as its headquarters. Her will stipulated that the property is to be maintained and can never be sold.
