= Galveston United States Post Office and Courthouse =

- Galveston U.S. Post Office, Custom House and Courthouse
- U.S. National Register of Historic Places
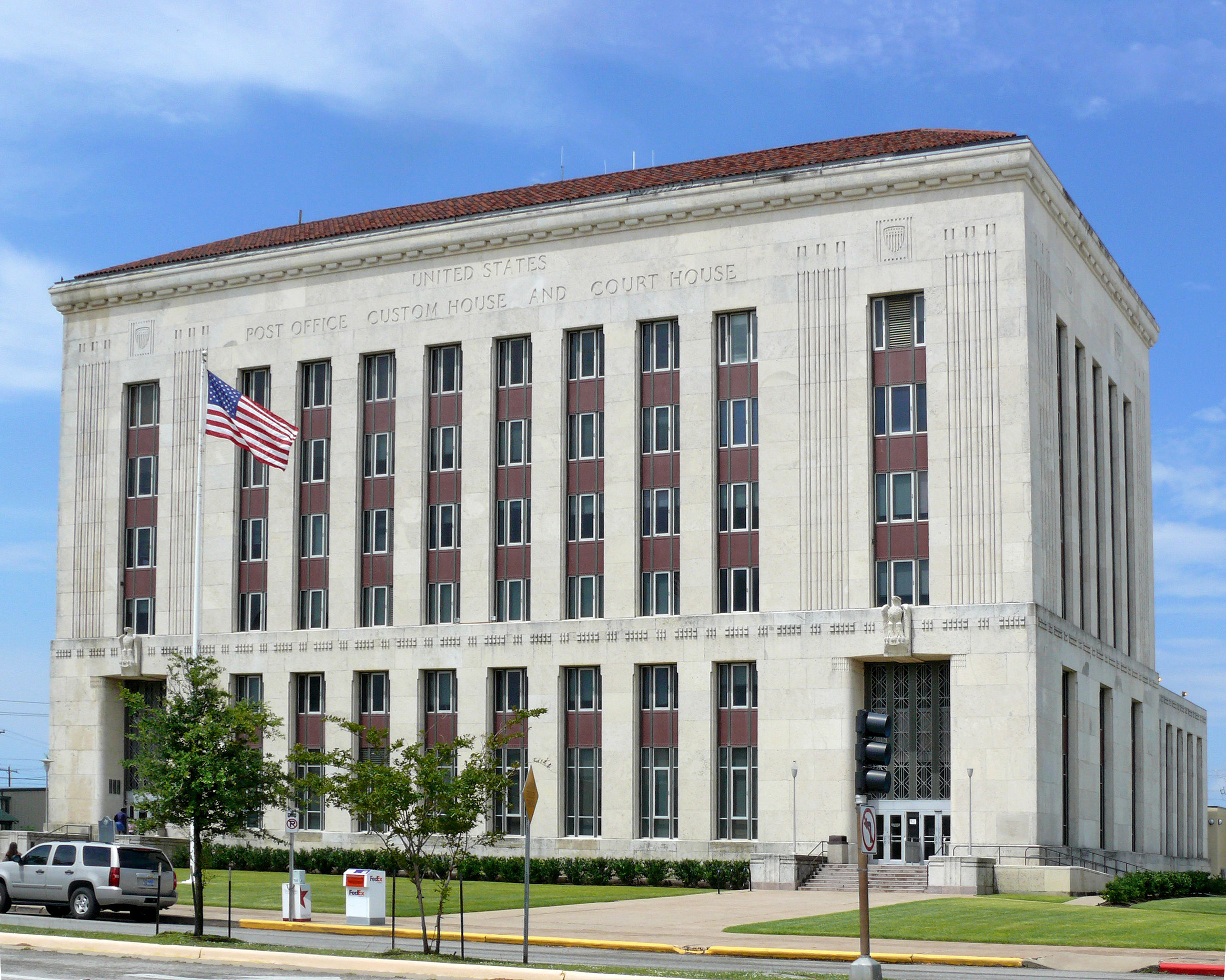
- Federal Building in 2009

- Location within Texas Location within the United States
- Interactive map showing the location of Galveston United States Post Office, Custom House and Courthouse
- Location: 601 25th St. (Rosenberg St.); Galveston, Texas
- Coordinates: 29°18′8″N 94°47′45″W
- Area: 1 acre (0.40 ha)
- Built: 1937
- Built by: Algernon Blair Construction Co.
- Architect: Alfred C. Finn
- Architectural style: Art Deco
- NRHP reference No.: 01000438
- Added to NRHP: April 25, 2001

The U.S. Post Office and Courthouse, also known as the Galveston Federal Building, is a post office and courthouse located in Galveston, Texas, United States. The building serves as the federal court for the Galveston Division of the United States District Court for the Southern District of Texas. Constructed in 1937, and added to the National Register of Historic Places in 2001 as Galveston U.S. Post Office, Custom House and Courthouse, the building is home to a number of federal agencies, and at one point housed the Galveston Bureau of the National Weather Service.

== Building history ==
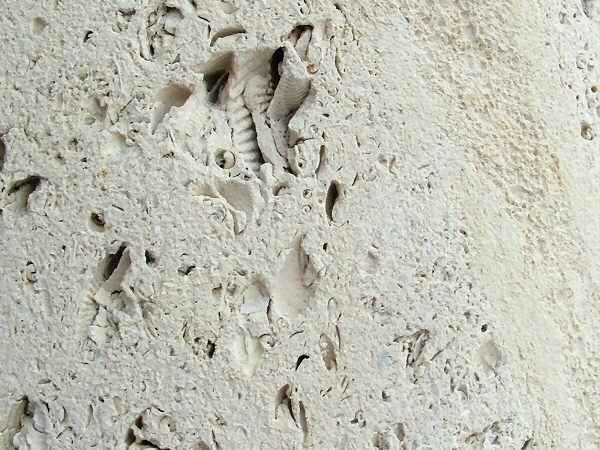
Close up of the exterior limestone cladding, with marine shell fossils visible.

The United States Post Office and Courthouse in Galveston is a representation of the Art Deco style of architecture, and the building has represented the Federal government in Galveston for 60 years.

It was the practice during the 1930s in the Art Deco style to use regional materials wherever possible. The United States Post Office and Courthouse in Galveston is clad with porous fossiliferous limestone. It is not known where the limestone was quarried, though the rock is typical of coastal areas. It was originally planned that the building be faced with brick. Local Congressman Joseph J. Mansfield and the Collector of Customs, Fred Papst, urged the Treasury Department to use limestone, a grander finish more fitting a Federal building. The construction of the Galveston United States Post Office and Courthouse took place during a period of unprecedented Federal construction. The passage of the Public Buildings Act in 1926 precipitated the construction of hundreds of Federal buildings under the auspices of the U. S. Treasury Department. The Galveston building was built in 1937 on the site of an older Post Office and Federal Building. The earlier romanesque building, constructed in the early 1890s, was demolished to prepare for the construction of the current Federal building. The first Post Office was built in Galveston in 1836. The previous Customs House and Court House was built in the late 1850s but due to Galveston's growth as a port city, the need for additional Federal office and court space necessitated further construction. In fact, the need was so great the 1890s structure became inadequate in slightly more than forty years.

Originally, the building housed the Post Office on the first floor; the postal inspectors on the second floor; various government offices on the third floor; the Customs Department on the fourth floor; petit and grand jury space on the fifth floor; judge's, U.S. Attorneys, U.S. Marshals, and the ceremonial courtroom on the sixth floor; the cotton classifying rooms, Bureau of Navigation and Bureau of Agriculture on the seventh floor. Though some tenants have changed, the basic function of the building as Post Office, Courthouse and Federal office building remains the same.

The Art Deco style is uncommon, and therefore, distinctive, in Galveston. Both the design and location of the building serve as symbols of the Federal government. The continued use of the building as a community focal point for postal and other Federal functions reiterates its importance to Galveston.

== Architecture ==
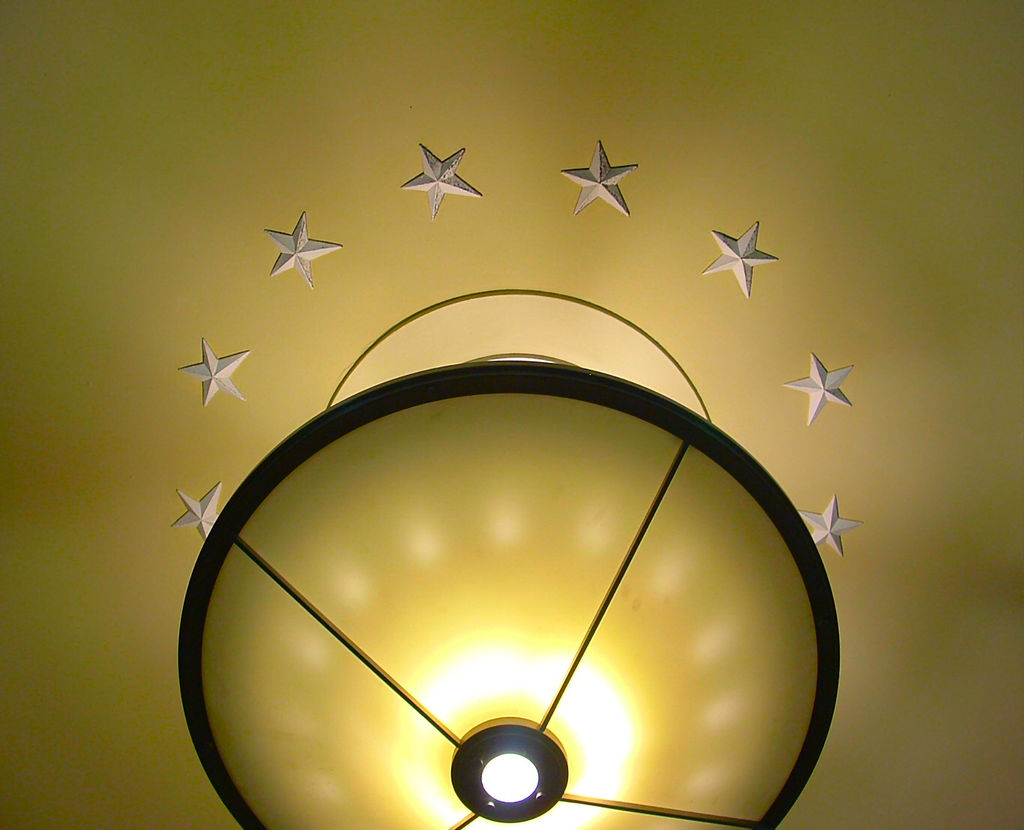
Art Deco style light fixtures and ornamental ceiling reliefs located in the first floor Main Lobby

The United States Post Office and Courthouse in Galveston, Texas is an eight-story (including the basement) Art Deco style limestone building sitting on a granite base. The east elevation is the main elevation, and is the most prominent mass of the building. On the north and south elevations, the building rises to seven stories at the east with a two-story projecting wing to the west. The variation in height is common to the Art Deco style.

On the east (main) elevation, the facade is divided into three pavilions by abstracted pilasters. The upper five floors rest on a two-story piano nobile crested by an ornamental string course. Carved eagles perch above the main entry doors at the north and south. The facade of the third through seventh floors is divided into ten bays of windows, with the first and tenth bays being above the north and south entries. The end window bays are flanked by incised pilasters. Between the pilasters and above the window bays are incised panels with a carved U.S. shield in the center. The pilasters dividing the central bays are incised at the inside next to the windows. Limestone mutules support a simple cornice. The roof is red clay tile.

Main entry to the building is at the north and south ends of the west elevation. Granite steps and limestone cheek walls lead to the main entries. The cheek walls have a fluted panel in the center and are bordered by fluted bands. Each entry is two stories in height and flanked by integral pilasters with a double fluted band at the top. The original doors with their ornate Deco design grillework have been replaced by two sets of aluminum, storefront-type double doors. Original exterior light fixtures flank the front doors. These fixtures, flush-mounted in groups of three, are vertical, rectangular bronze frames with scored bands at the top and bottom. The glazing is translucent.

The replacement, fixed casement windows, though not identical to the original, are similar in appearance. First floor windows have an elongated central light with sidelights, transoms and hoppers. Second through seventh floor windows are similar except they have no hoppers. The windows are set within fluted cast iron frames in vertical window bays creating an illusion of height. Each floor is separated by cast iron spandrels which feature a scalloped pattern at the bottom.

The building retains the seven-story massing at the east end of both the north and south elevations. This portion of the facades is finished the same as the east elevation. The two-story wing which projects to the west continues the stringcourse along its roof level. The west elevation is finished in a similar way to the others except for the presence of the loading dock in the center and the fire escape to the northwest.

Significant interior spaces include the main lobby and the original sixth floor courtroom. The lobby retains its terrazzo floors and marble walls. The sixth floor courtroom has full-height walnut panelling at the walls and retains the original cork tile floor in the spectator area. Distinctive bronze chandeliers, of a design reminiscent of "scales of justice", become a focal point of the room.

== Building facts ==
- Architects: Alfred C. Finn
- Construction Dates: 1937
- Landmark Status: Listed in the National Register of Historic Places
- Location: 601 Rosenberg (25th Street)
- Architectural Style: Art Deco
- Primary Materials: porous fossiliferous limestone
- Prominent Features: Spanish-barrel tile roof, impassive limestone eagles adorning the building from above, scalloped wall patterns around the windows. The building was also recognized as Energy Star qualified in 2004.

== See also ==
- National Register of Historic Places listings in Galveston County, Texas
- United States Customs House and Court House (Galveston, Texas, 1861)
- United States District Court for the Southern District of Texas, Galveston Division
