= Harper Fowlkes House =

Historic building in Savannah, Georgia, US

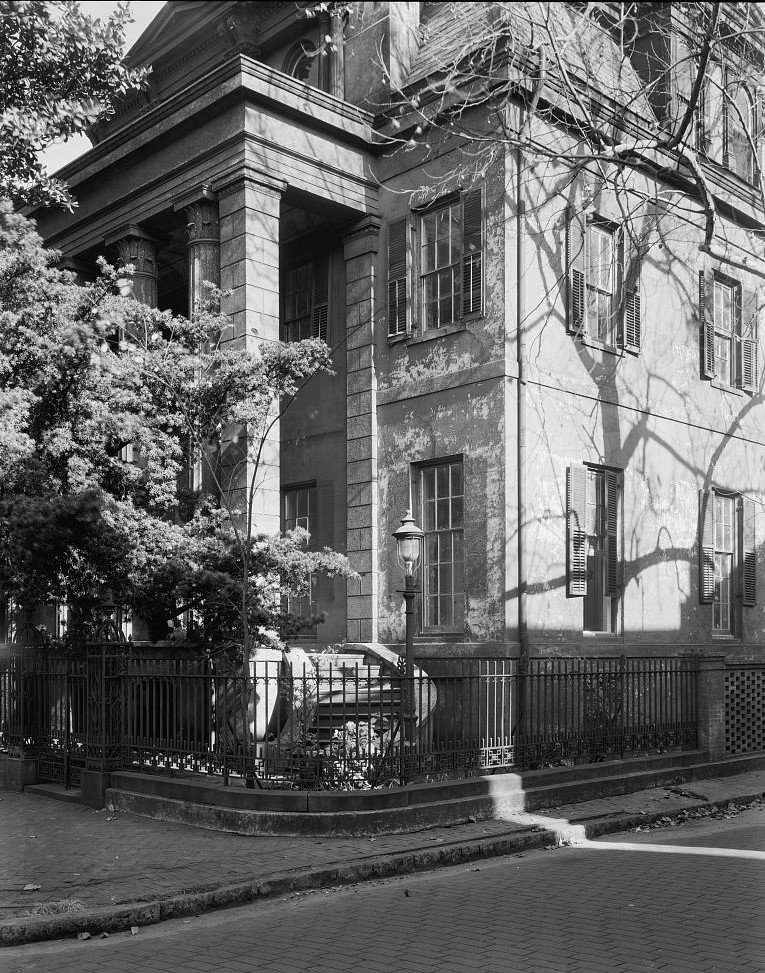
- The southwestern corner of the house during the Second World War years, viewed from the corner of Barnard Street and West Perry Street
- Former names: Champion-McAlpin-Fowlkes House

General information
- Architectural style: Greek Revival
- Location: Savannah, Georgia, U.S., 230 Barnard Street, Orleans Square
- Coordinates: 32.076050°N 81.094822°W
- Construction started: 1842
- Completed: 1844 (182 years ago)
- Owner: • Stephen Gardner (1842–1843) • John Gardner (1843) • Aaron Champion (1843–1880) • James McAlpin (1880–) • Maria McAlpin (–1890) • Aaron, James W. Jr., Henry, Mary and Maria Champion (1890–1895) • Henry Champion (1895–1931) • Mary Auza McAlpin and Claudia McAlpin Whitney (1931–1939) • Alida Harper Fowlkes (1939–1985) • Society of the Cincinnati in the State of Georgia (1985–present)

Technical details
- Floor count: 3

Design and construction
- Architect: Charles B. Cluskey

Harper Fowlkes House is a historic building in Savannah, Georgia, United States. It is located at 230 Barnard Street, in the southeastern trust lot of Orleans Square, and was built in 1844. It is in the Greek Revival style.

== History ==
A local shipping magnate, Stephen Gardner, hired architect Charles B. Cluskey to design the house. Gardner ran into financial difficulty, however, and sold the property to his brother, John, who then sold it to Aaron Champion. Aaron and Mary Jane Griggs Champion's only child, daughter Maria, married James Wallace McAlpin (1831–1905), and used the home for an entertaining venue while living at the Hermitage Plantation, two miles down the Savannah River. McAlpin became the trustee of the plantation in 1866 after Champion was forced to foreclose on it.

Upon Champion's death in 1880, the Barnard Street property was left to McAlpin, to be held in a trust for his daughter and their children: Aaron Champion (b. December 30, 1857), Henry (b. August 4, 1860), Mary Ellen (b. February 27, 1863), James Wallace Jr. (b. April 24, 1865) and Maria (b. January 31, 1869).

Maria Champion McAlpin later owned 24 East Jones Street. She died on September 18, 1890. Five years later, the siblings sold their interest in the house to Henry.

Henry's first wife died. His second marriage, in 1895, was to Isabel Wilbur, of Philadelphia. Her father, Elisha, paid off the $15,000 mortgage on the property, before giving it to the newlyweds as a wedding gift.

Isabel renovated the house in 1895, to accommodate her five Irish servants, by adding a third floor and a mansard roof. She died in 1905. Henry survived her by 26 years, dying in April 1931. His third wife, Mary Auza McAlpin, and daughter by his first wife, Claudia McAlpin Whitney, were left equal shares of the property.

Alida Harper Fowlkes purchased the property via auction in October 1939, paying $9,000.

Maria McAlpin Strong Nichols, granddaughter of Aaron Champion McAlpin, visited the property around 2015 at the age of 87. She died around 2019. The McAlpin family and its offshoots made a donation to the Harper Fowlkes House in 2018.
