= Hermitage Plantation (Georgia) =

Former plantation in Savannah, Georgia

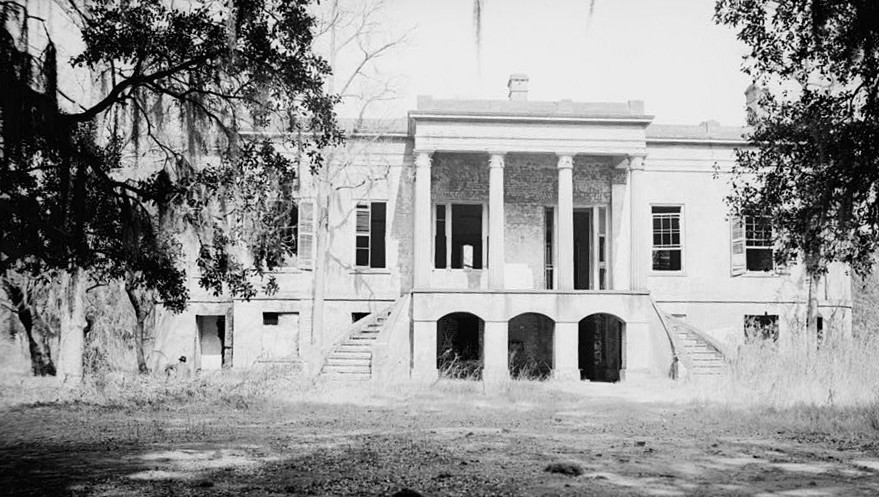
- The plantation's mansion, pictured shortly before its demolition in 1934
- Interactive map of the Hermitage Plantation area

General information
- Location: Savannah, Georgia, U.S.
- Coordinates: 31.95966°N 81.01990°W
- Completed: c. 1825
- Demolished: c. 1934
- Owner: Jean de Bérard de Moquet; Henry McAlpin

Hermitage Plantation was a plantation located around 3 miles (4.8 km) east of Savannah, Georgia. Its mansion stood from sometime in 1825 until its demolition date in 1934. The plantation also included Savannah's largest brickworks.

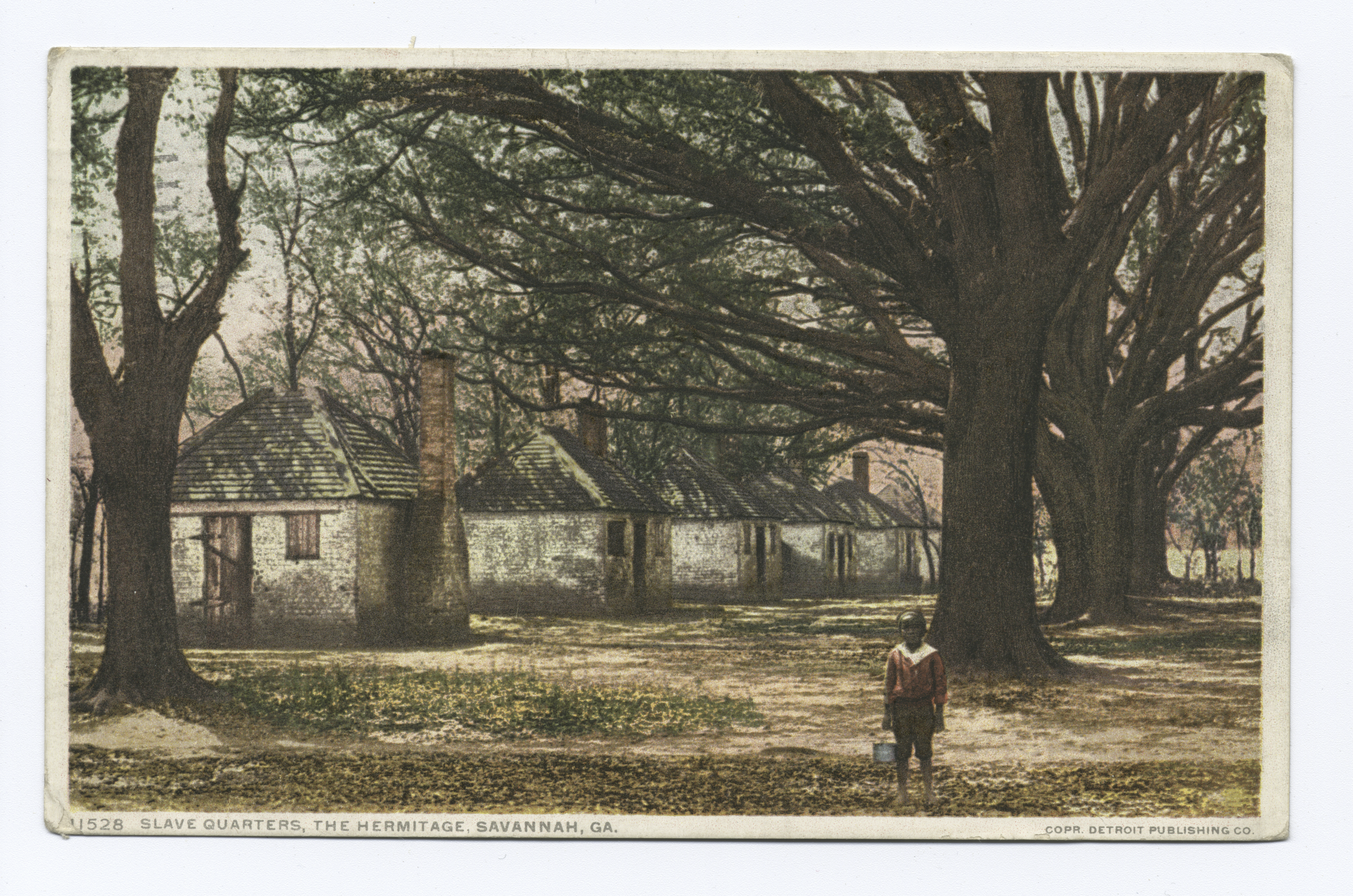
Slave quarters in Hermitage plantation

The plantation's mansion was built for Scottish architect and builder Henry McAlpin and his wife, Ellen McInnis, of Charleston, South Carolina. McAlpin had purchased the plantation, then around 220 acres (89 ha) in size, from Jean de Bérard-Moquet-Montalet (who had purchased it from Patrick Mackay). It was run by 65 slaves.

During Savannah's Province of Georgia colonial period, the land, located between Musgrove Creek and Pipemaker's Creek, was owned by Yamacraw Indians. After the death of Tomochichi in 1741, the Yamacraw Indians left the area. It was claimed by the British Crown in 1750, by which time colonists were already living there.

McAlpin expanded the property to cover 600 acres (240 ha) and increased its number of slaves by over one hundred. He also replaced the original plantation home with a mansion designed by William Jay. Other sources claim it was designed by Charles B. Cluskey. The mansion was located at the end of a long driveway lined on either side by oak trees.

Rice was grown at the plantation, but the Hermitage was mostly an industrial site, with steam-powered saw and planing mills, a rice barrel factory. It also contained Savannah's largest brickworks, which produced more than 60 million bricks. Many of its "Savannah Grey" bricks were used to build Savannah's early homes.

Union Camp Corporation later occupied the plantation site.

== See also ==
- Bonaventure Plantation
- Greenwich Plantation
