= United States Customs House and Court House (Galveston, Texas) =

- Old Galveston Customhouse
- U.S. National Register of Historic Places
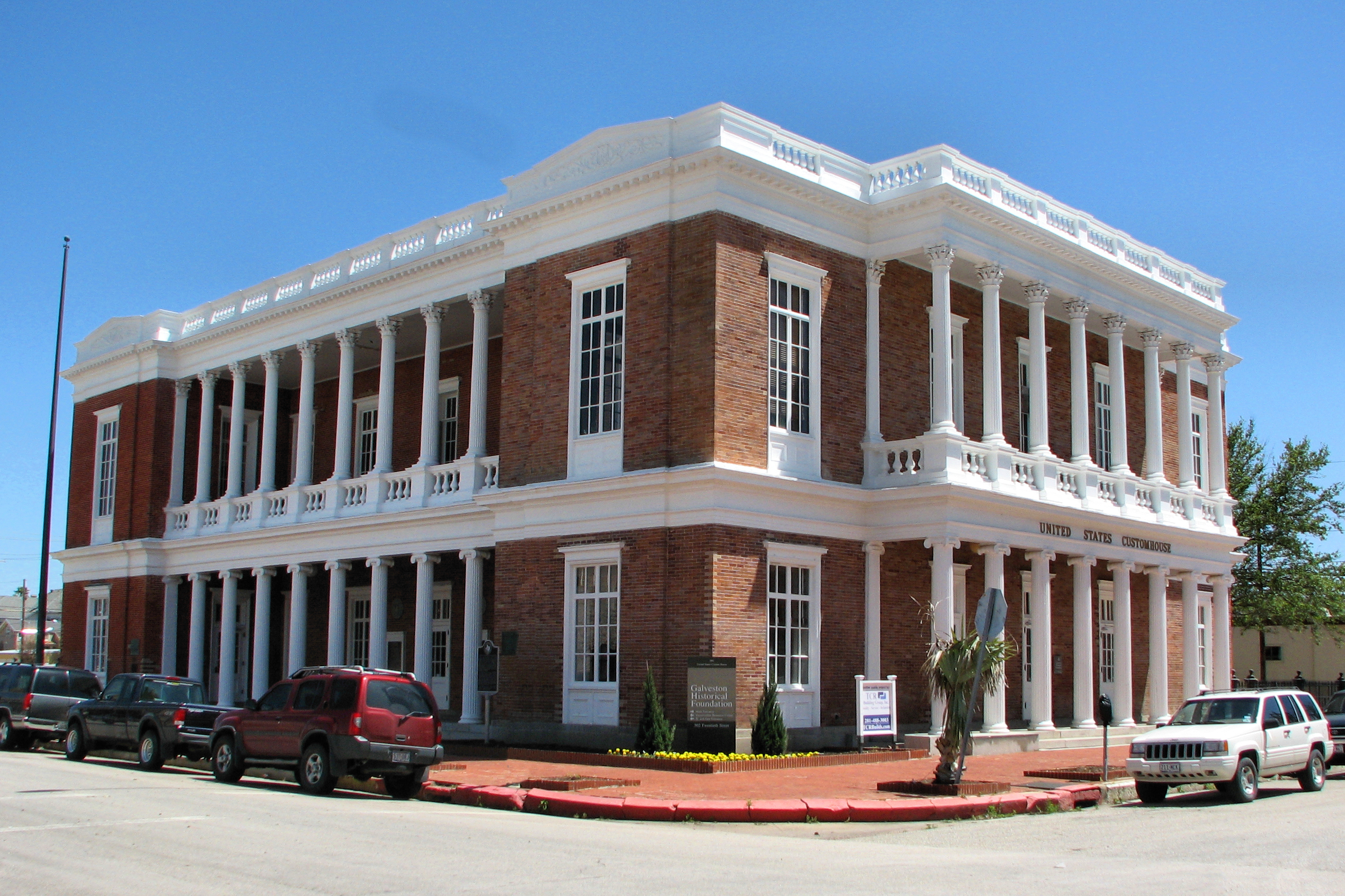
- Old Galveston Customhouse in 2009

- Location within Texas Location within the United States
- Interactive map showing the location for Old Galveston Customhouse
- Location: 1917 Postoffice St., Galveston, Texas
- Coordinates: 29°18′18″N 94°47′23″W
- Area: 0.3 acres (0.12 ha)
- Built by: Charles B. Cluskey, E.W. Moore
- Architect: Ammi B. Young
- Architectural style: Greek Revival
- NRHP reference No.: 70000747
- Added to NRHP: August 25, 1970

The United States Customs House and Court House, also known as Old Galveston Customhouse, in Galveston, Texas, is a former home of custom house, post office, and court facilities for the United States District Court for the Eastern District of Texas, and later for the United States District Court for the Southern District of Texas. Completed in 1861, the structure is now owned and operated by The Hodge Law Firm.

== Building history ==
The building symbolized the importance and prosperity of Galveston which was Texas' leading seaport and commercial city during the nineteenth century, and the port where most of the imported commercial goods entered the state. The city's business community was primarily concerned with wholesale commerce, and furnished the trade goods for all of Texas, the Indian Territory, and parts of Louisiana and New Mexico. With rising revenue from customs receipts, the United States Congress approved funds in 1855 for a new U.S. custom house.

Original plan and construction: In 1855 the U.S. Congress appropriated the sum of $100,000 to build a Custom House building for Galveston, Texas. Plans and specifications were prepared by the supervising architect of the office of Construction of the U.S. Government Treasury Department who was at that time Ammi Burnham Young. Several bid submissions were required before the department secured the proper degree of formality of presentation and on the third bidding date, February 12, 1857, the contract was awarded to the contractors, C.B. Cluskey of Washington and E.W. Moore of Galveston. Their bid was for $869,723.93 This began a series of difficulties and problems that beset the whole building history of the Custom House.

Supervising Architect of the Treasury Ammi Burnham Young produced the original design for the building in 1857. Public officials immediately rejected Young's three-story design on the grounds that it lacked sufficient space. A new scheme by Charles B. Cluskey (1805–1871) and E.W. Moore (1810–1865) was accepted in 1859. Their design was based on Young's concept, but provided additional space for the Custom Service and Post Office.

The building was begun in 1860 and completed in 1861. The Boston firm of Blaisdell and Emerson built it in 114 days, an unprecedented accomplishment at the time. The extensive use of fireproof cast iron was revolutionary then and likely accounted for the building's survival from the 1885 Galveston fire. During the Civil War, the Confederate Army occupied the building. In 1865 it was the site of the ceremony officially ending the war in Galveston. The U.S. Government resumed occupancy that year after making extensive repairs. It served as a courthouse for the United States District Court for the Eastern District of Texas from 1862 until 1891, and was then retired from court service for a time.

According to the Historical Marker Database, before construction began on the U.S. Custom House in 1957, the three lots where the U.S. Custom House sits, were bid multiple times, the contract was negotiated multiple times, the building design was also changed multiple times. The Historical Marker Database describes the layout of the newly built federal building as the post office in the west part of the ground level with the custom house in the east part and the court, the clerks and marshal on the upper floor. Historical Marker Database notes that On March 17, 1861, the work on the U.S. Custom House was taken over by the United States Government and the building was nearly complete when Texas seceded from the Union. Historical Marker Database reports that during the battle to capture Galveston, the U.S. Custom House was impacted by a nine-inch shell, fired by the Federal fleet, which passed through a wall but did not explode. When Federal troops captured Galveston in 1862, the Federal troops did not occupy the U.S. Custom House.

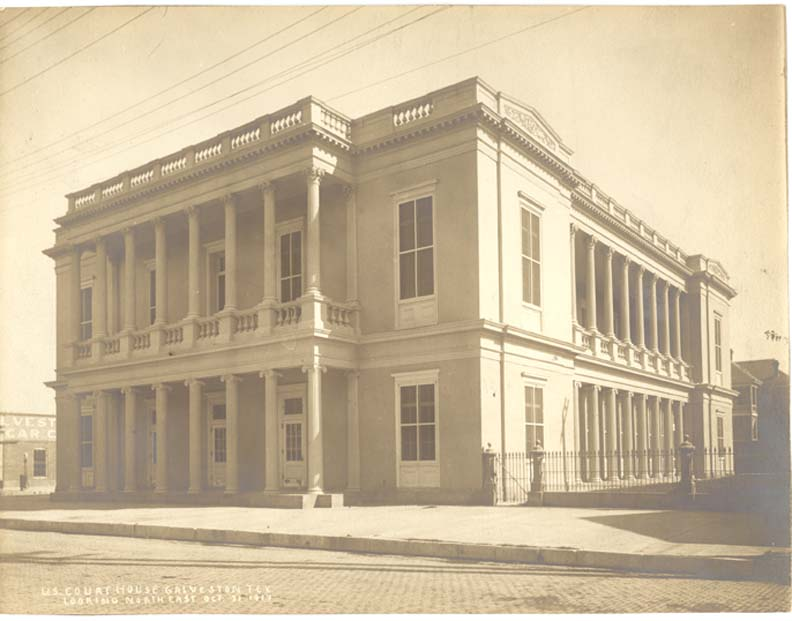
The Court House in 1917

Significant alterations were made in 1917, when the General Services Administration added courtrooms and judicial offices to the second floor of the U.S. Custom House, which then became the Federal Courthouse, serving the United States District Court for the Southern District of Texas. This location would later become the seat of the Galveston Division, after congress added a second judgeship in the 1930s. The building continued to serve as a courthouse until 1917, and housed offices for federal agencies throughout the twentieth century. The courthouse function was replaced in 1937 by the Galveston United States Post Office and Courthouse. It was listed in the National Register of Historic Places in 1970. In 1998 the Galveston Historical Foundation signed a cooperative agreement with the U.S. General Services Administration that permitted the Foundation to lease and rehabilitate the building for its headquarters.

== Building Juneteenth history ==
According to the Helen Hall Library's Juneteenth Section, General Order No. 3 was read at, in addition to other locations, the U.S. Custom House by General Gordon Granger as he marched through Galveston, Texas with approximately two thousand Federal Soldiers.

== Historic building photos ==
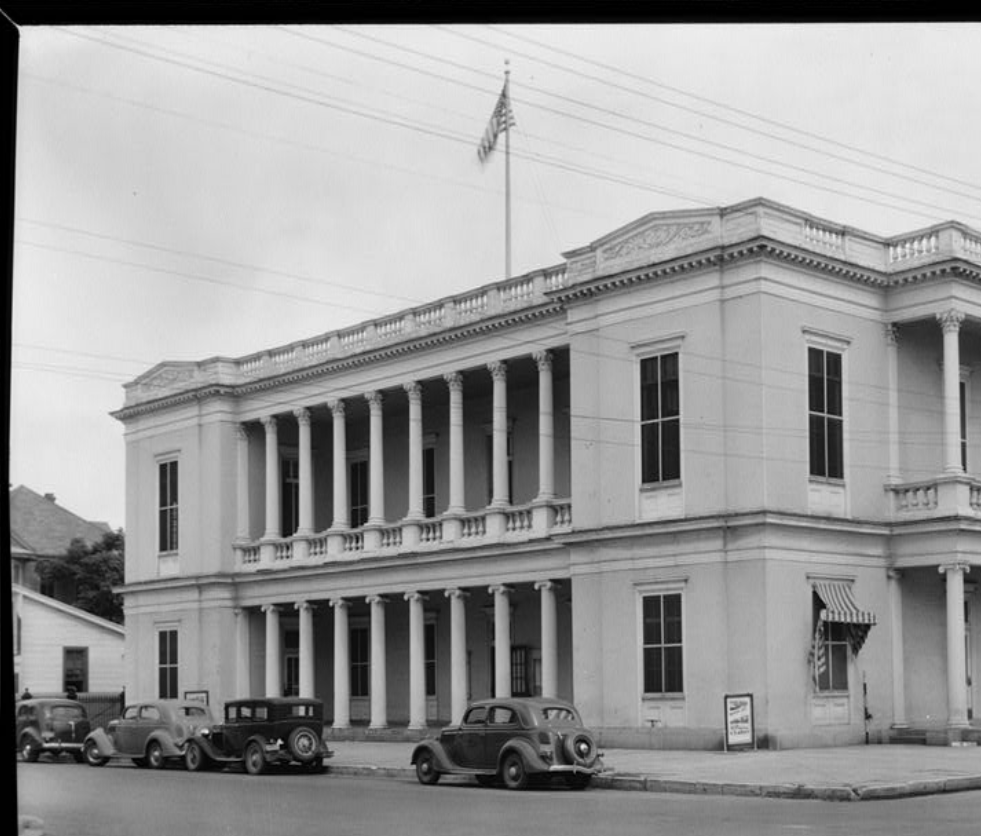
North & East Elevations

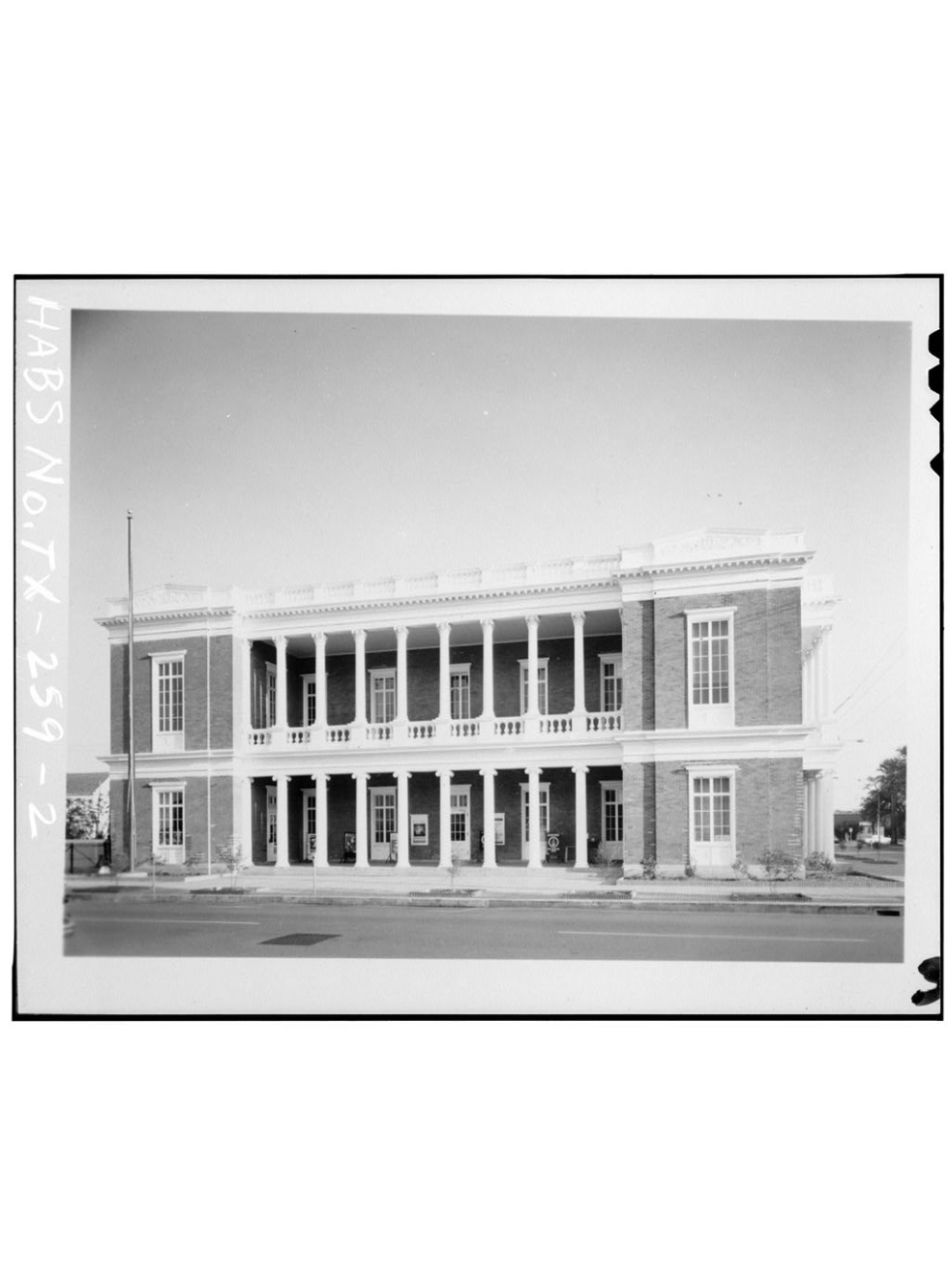
Principal North Side

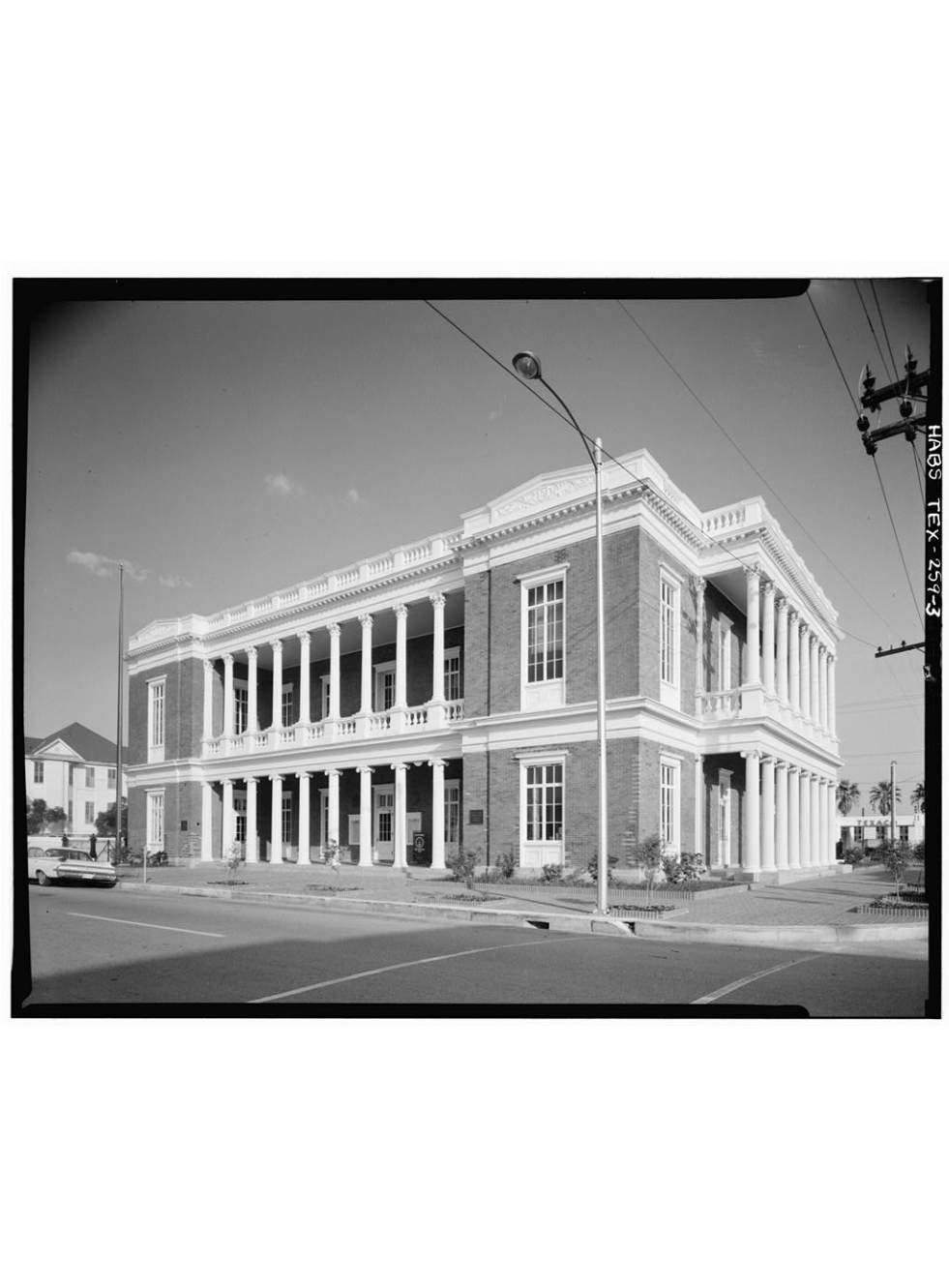
Principal North and West Sides

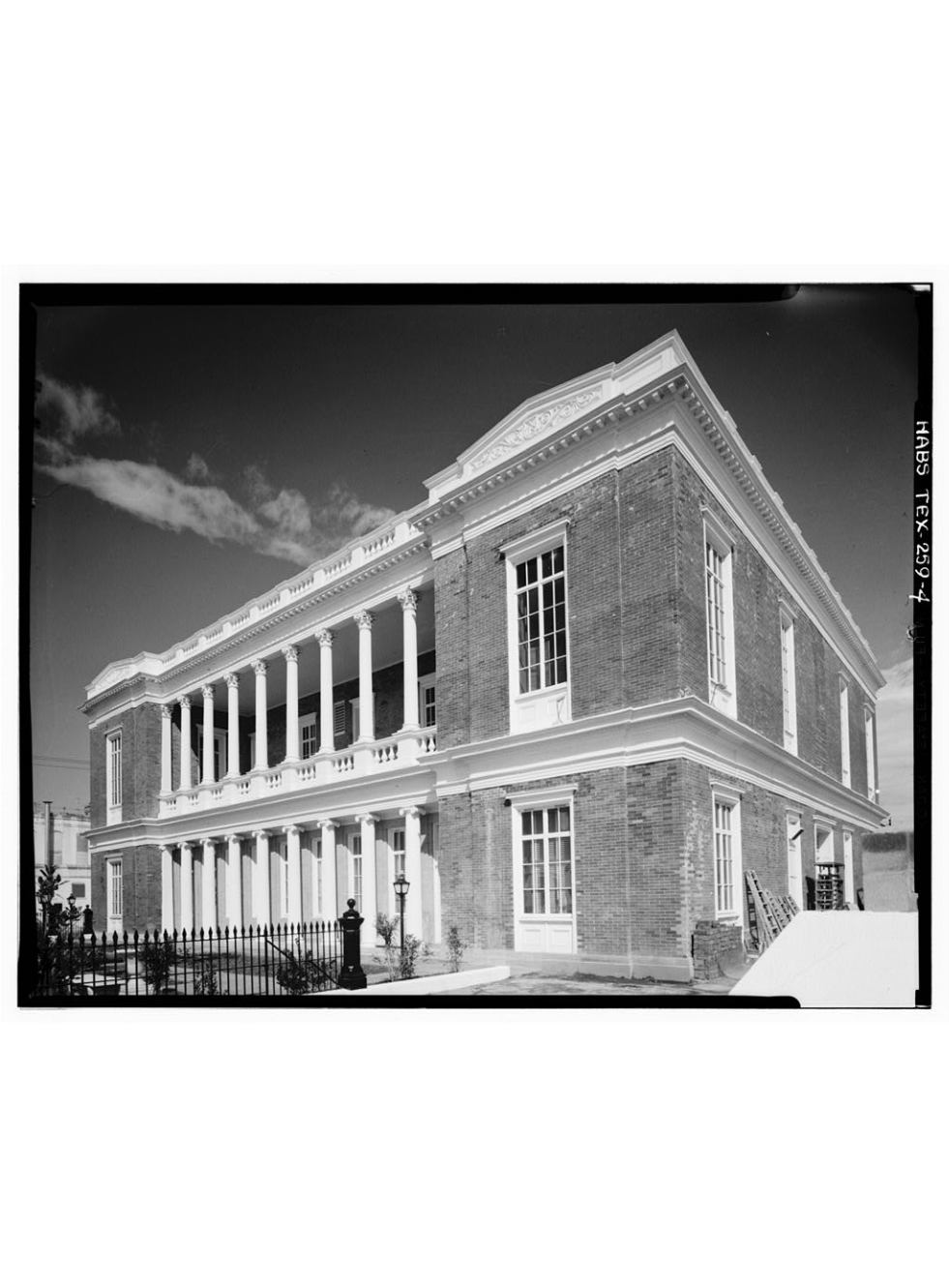
Rear South and East Sides

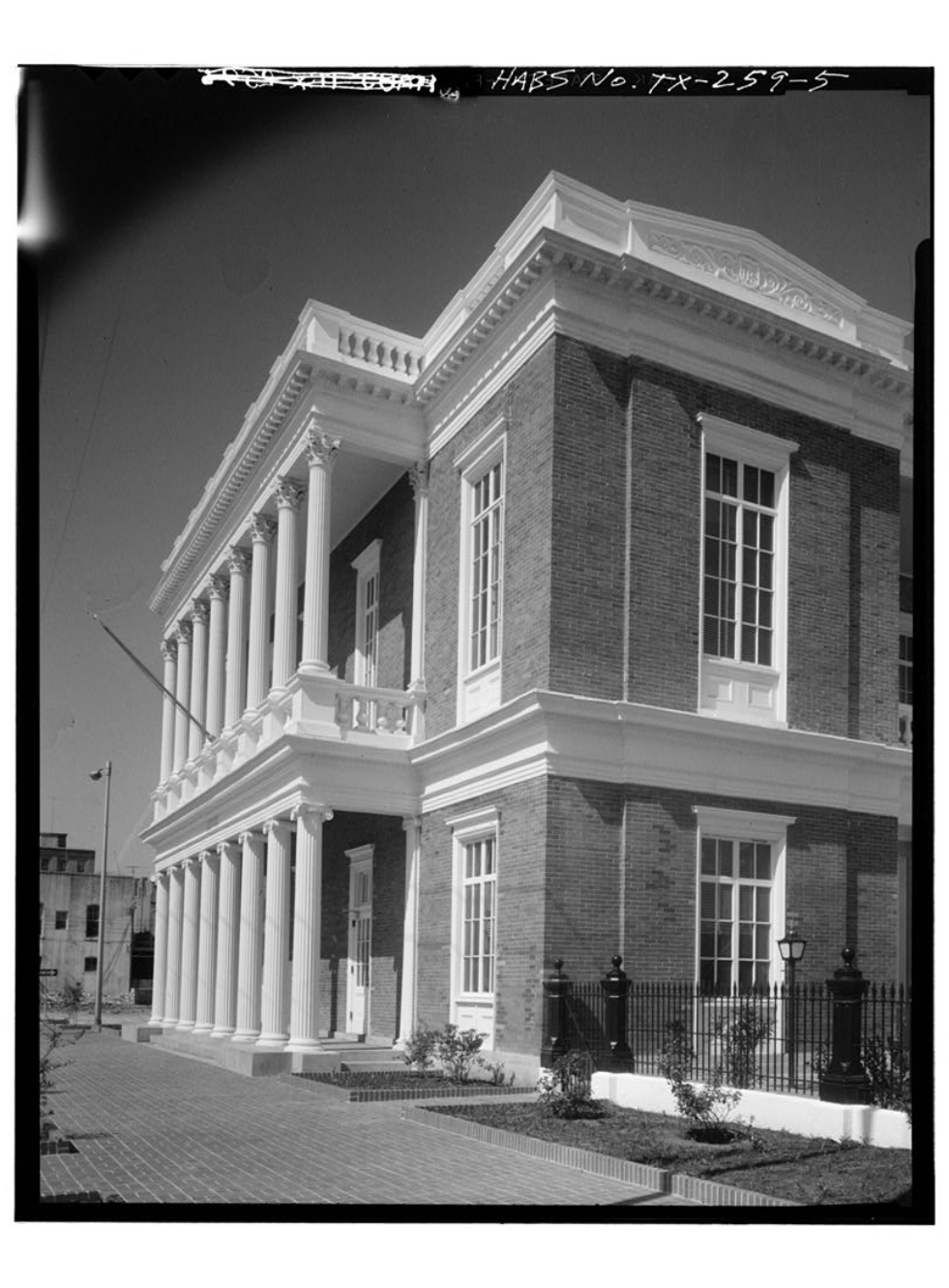
Detail of Projecting Loggia West Side

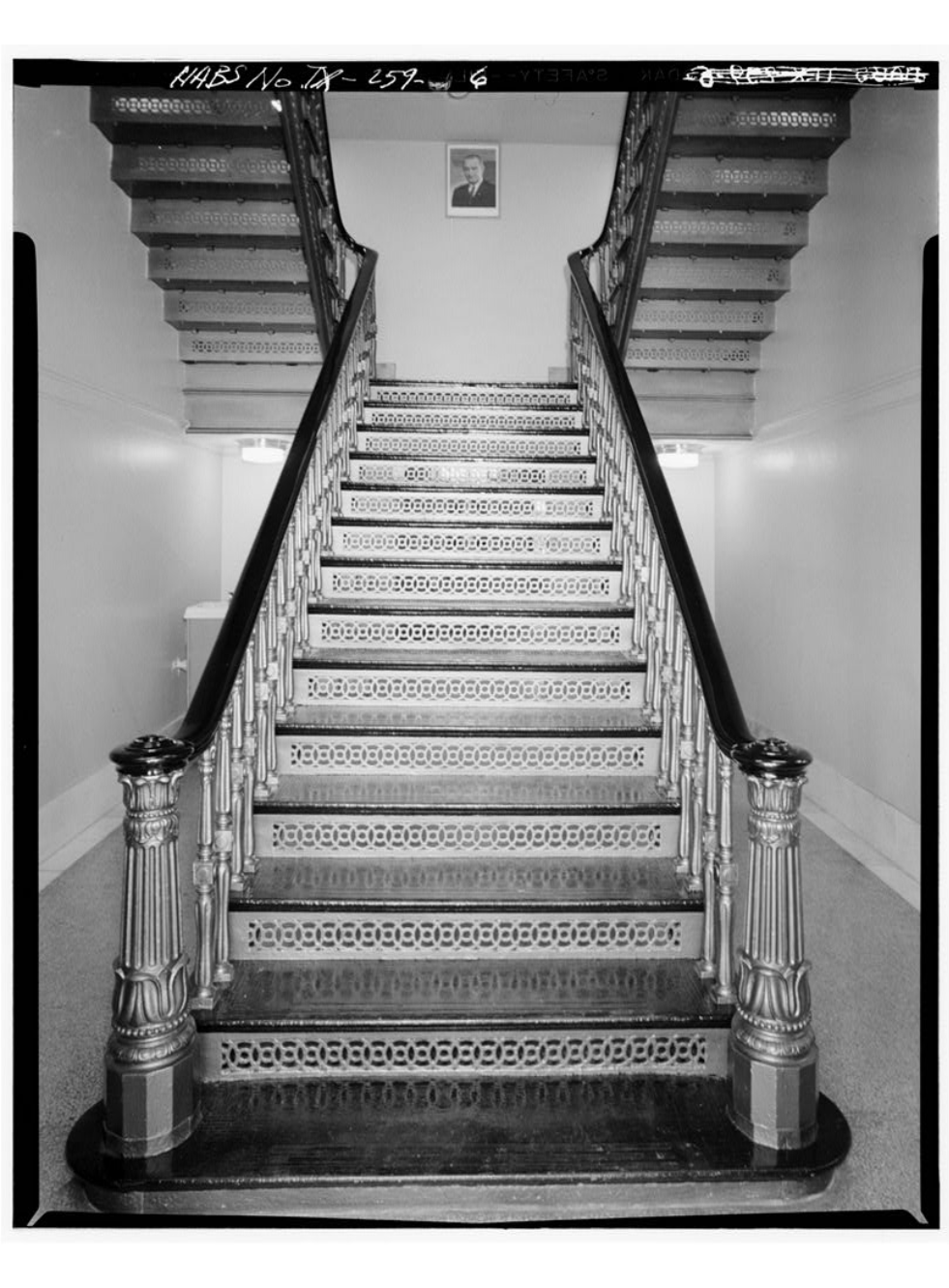
Detail of Interior Center Stairway

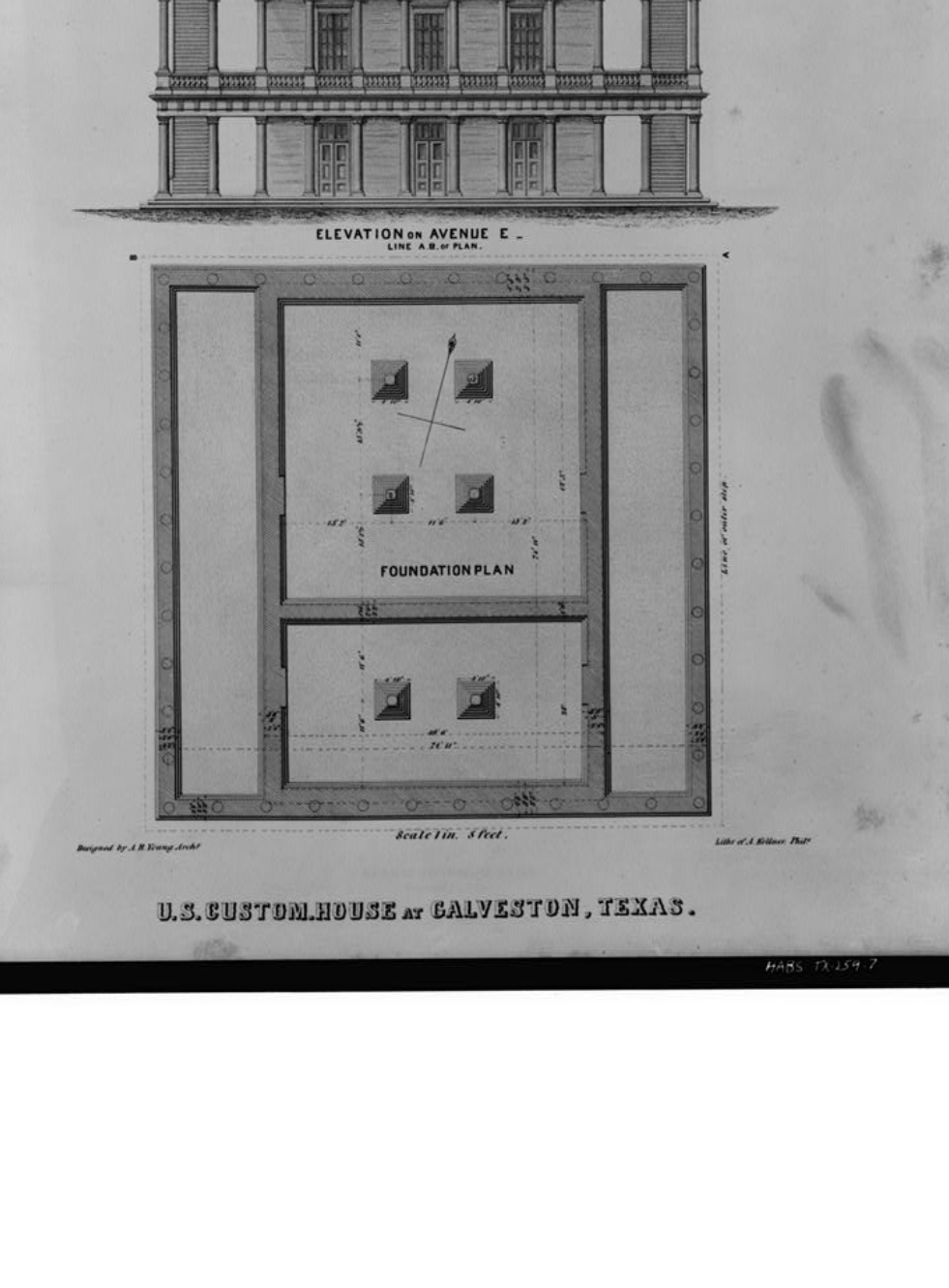
Original Plan Elevation By Ammi B. Young

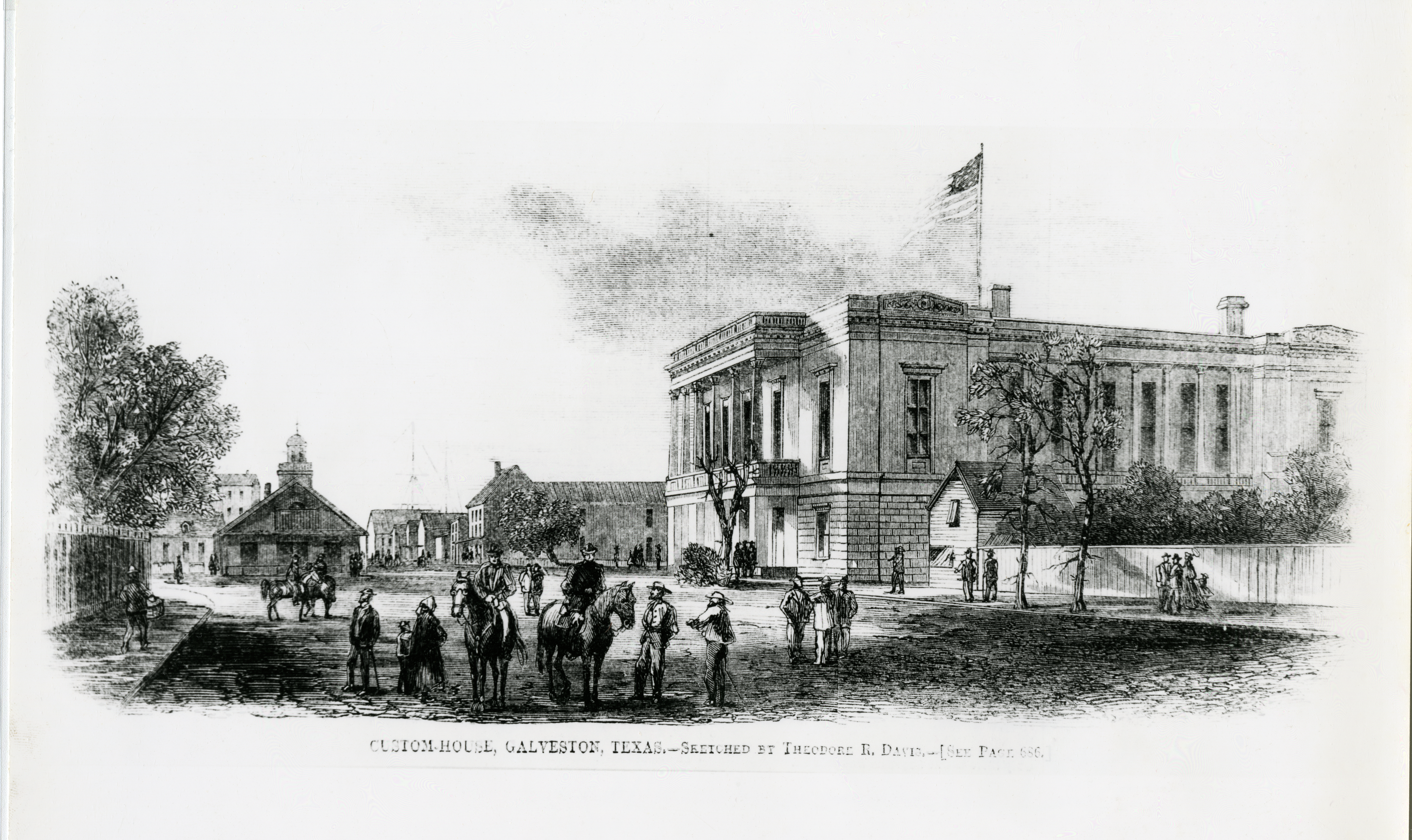
Sketch by Theodore R. Davis

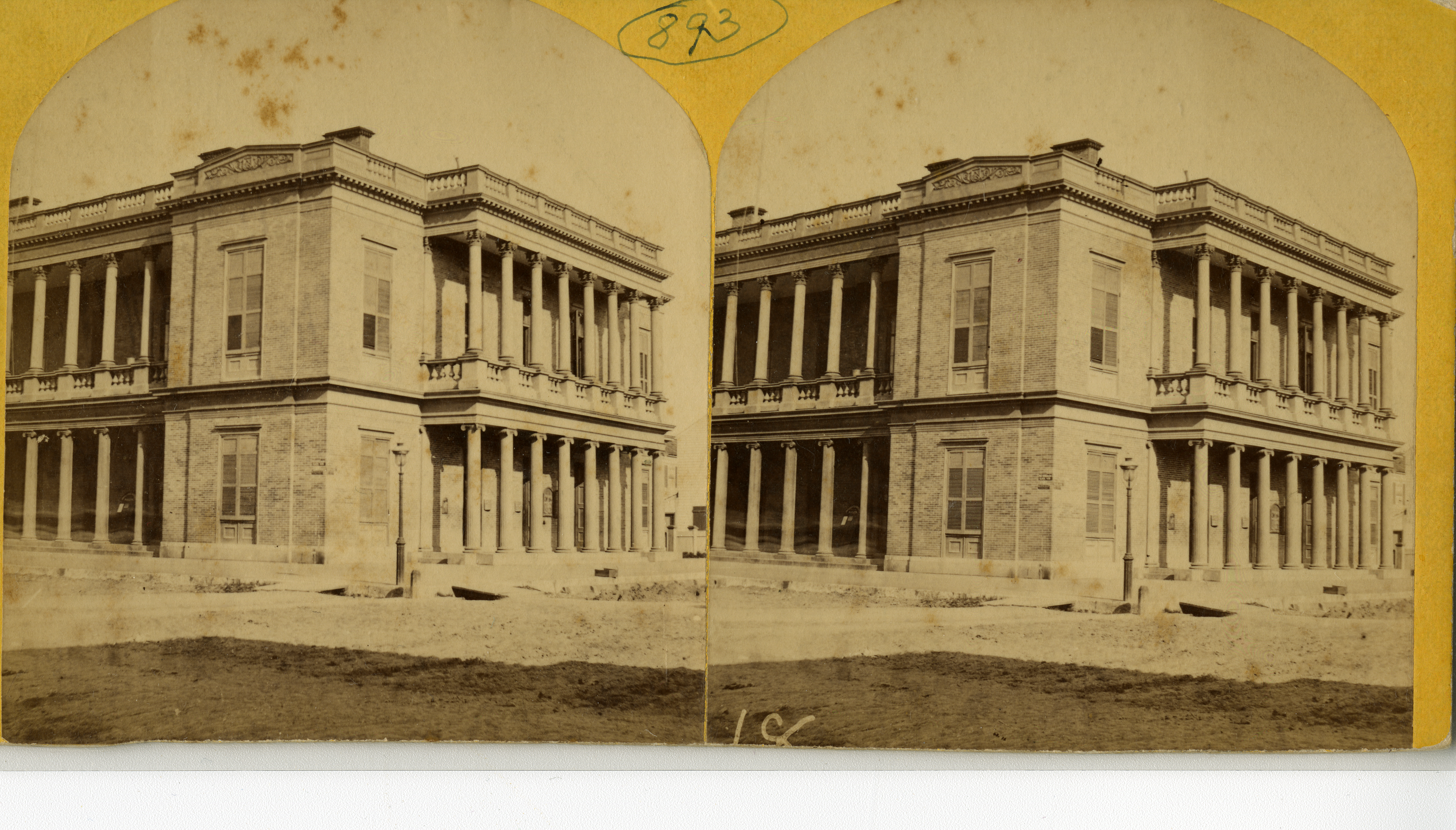
Northwest View

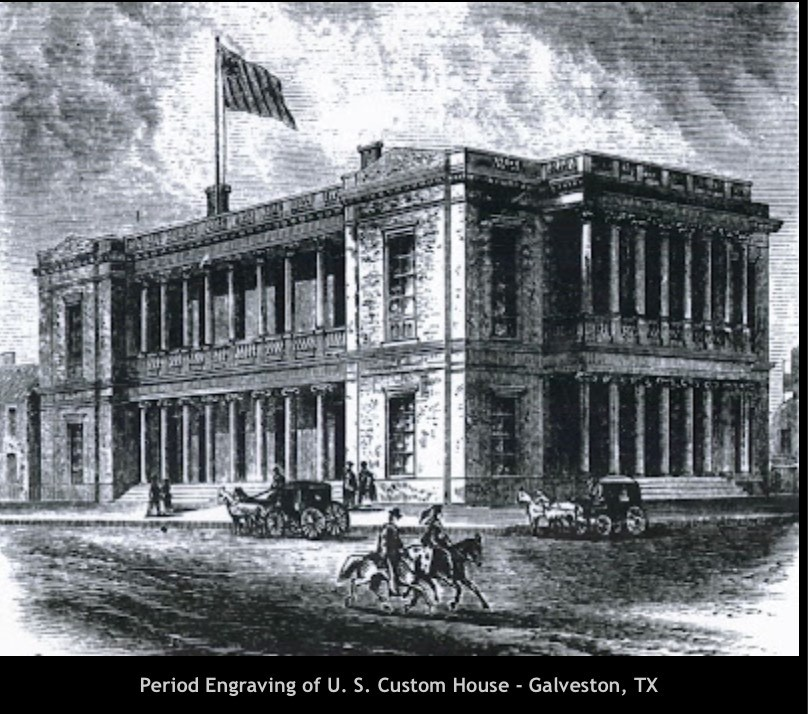
Period Engraving

Northwest View with Utility Pole

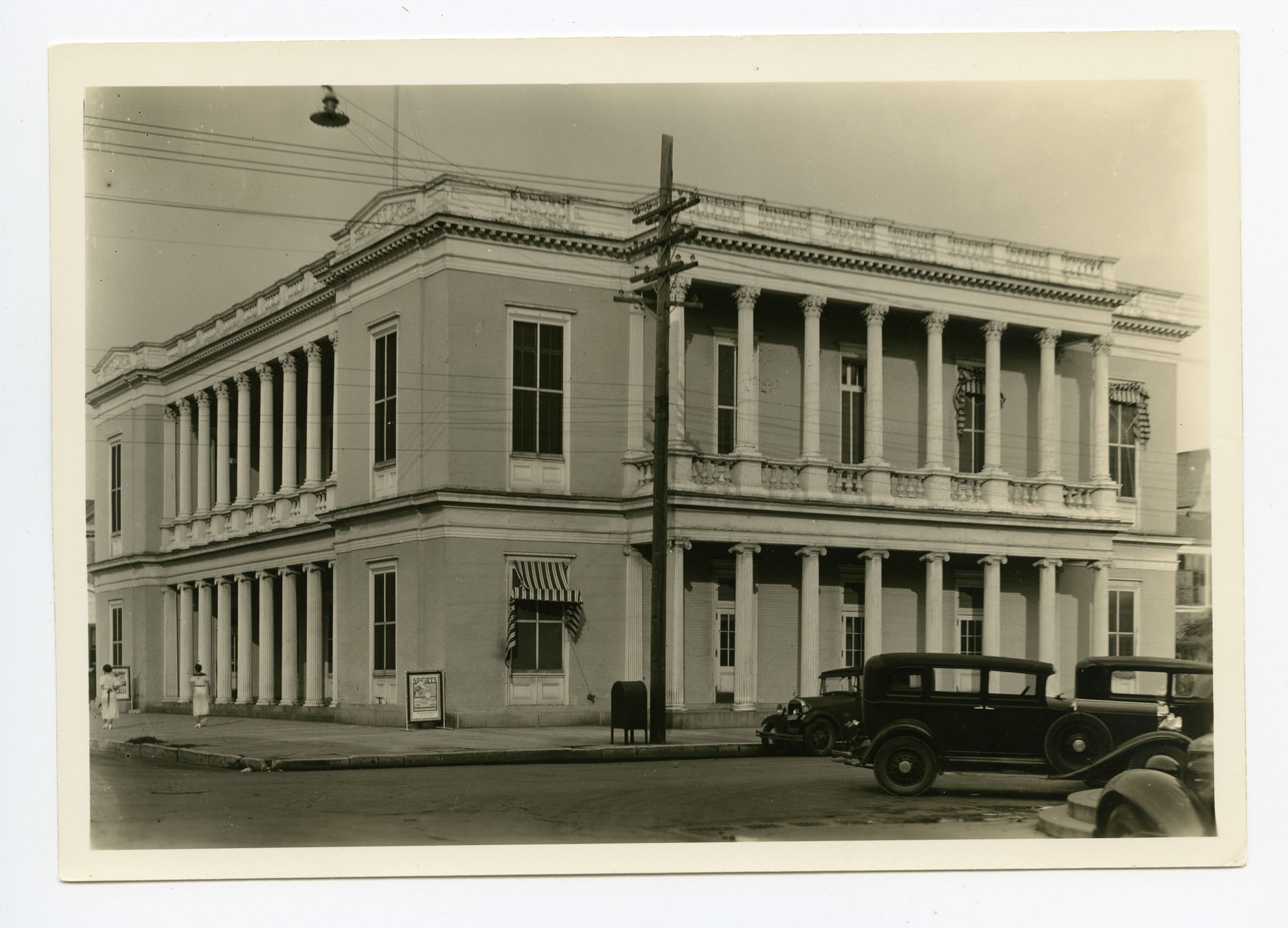
Northeast View

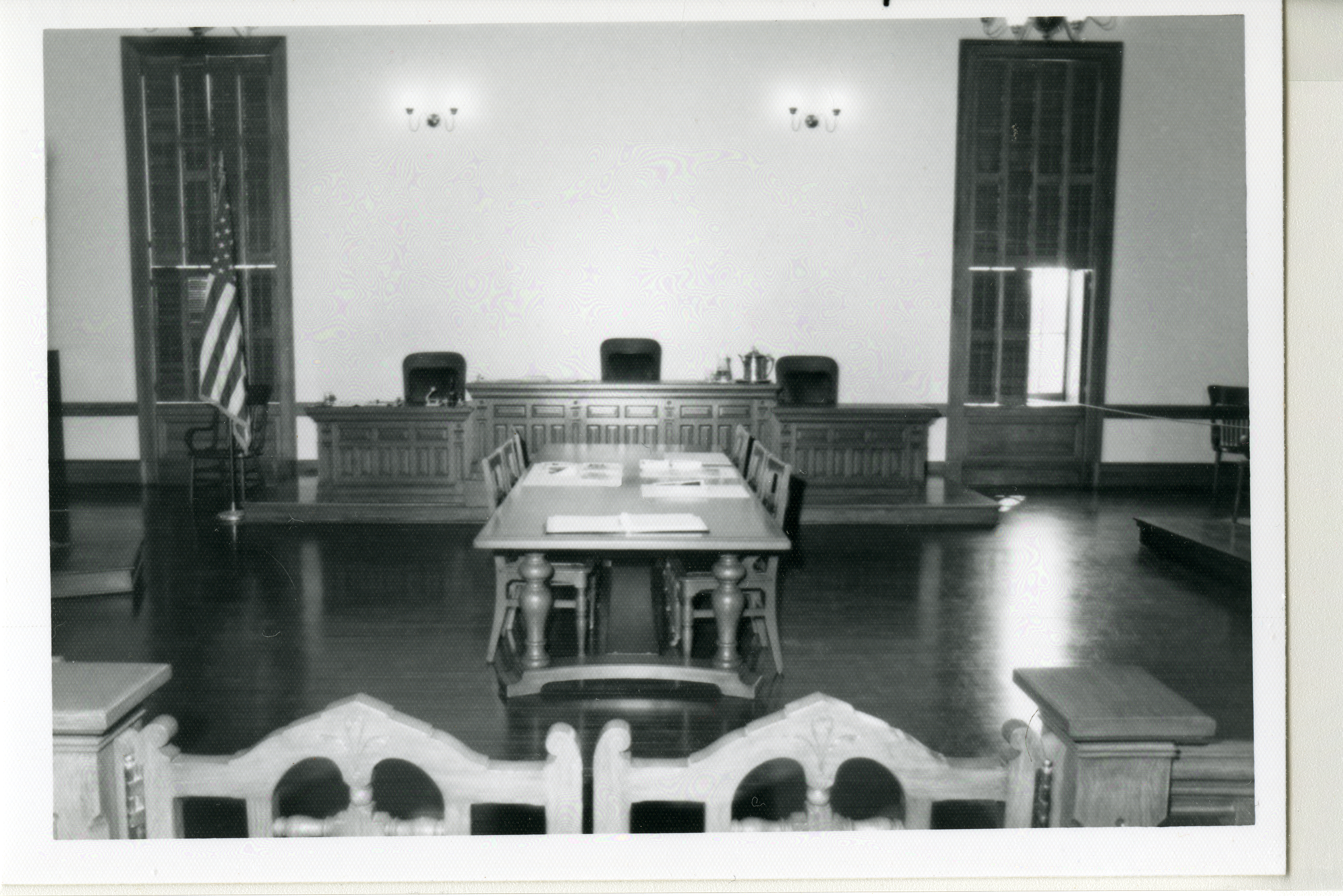
Courtroom

== Architecture ==
The U.S. Custom House in Galveston is a simply detailed Classical Revival, two-story, brick building located near the waterfront in Galveston. The most notable features are the projecting double gallery on the west facade and the inset double galleries on the longer, north and south facades. The exterior walls are hard-fired, red-brown bricks with tan bricks used as accents around the corners and doorjambs. The prominent location at the southeast corner of Twentieth and Post Office (Avenue E) Streets emphasizes its importance to Galveston's shipping-based economy.

Nearly all the original decorative elements on the exterior of the building are cast iron including columns, cornices, balustrades, dentils, entablatures, and window architraves. These elements from the specifications and designs of the original architect Ammi B. Young, were made in New York City and shipped to Galveston. The first-story galleries have Ionic columns set on a granite base. An entablature extends completely around the building separating the first and second floors. The piano nobile is larger in height, and the galleries contain taller, Corinthian columns and a cast-iron balustrade. A classically inspired balustrade caps the building.

The interior of the building is H-shaped in plan and was originally designed to provide space for the Customs Service and the Post Office. Extant original elements include the elaborate cast-iron, double-return stair leading to the second floor. The stair's ornamental newel posts have an acanthus motif and fluted shafts set on octagonal bases. The cast-iron risers are pierced with a circular fret design.

In 1917 the U.S. Custom House was converted for use as a Federal courthouse and a courtroom was created on the second floor. The U.S. Custom House survived the Civil War and various disasters including the 1885 Galveston Fire, the Great Galveston Hurricane of 1900, Hurricane Carla in 1967, and a boiler explosion in 1978 that resulted in the closing of the second floor for almost two decades. Although these events required extensive repairs and renovations, the U.S. Custom House's fireproof construction ensured the survival of its most significant stylistic elements.

In 1998 a public-private partnership was established between the U.S. General Services Administration and the Galveston Historical Foundation to allow for the restoration of the building by the Galveston Historical Foundation for use as its headquarters and historic preservation resource center. Assisted by private donations, the careful and sensitive rehabilitation included the removal of 1960s dropped ceilings, the restoration of the second floor, and the removal of the non-original interior wood shutters. The Galveston Historical Foundation formally moved into the refurbished U.S. Custom House in June 1999.

== Significant events ==
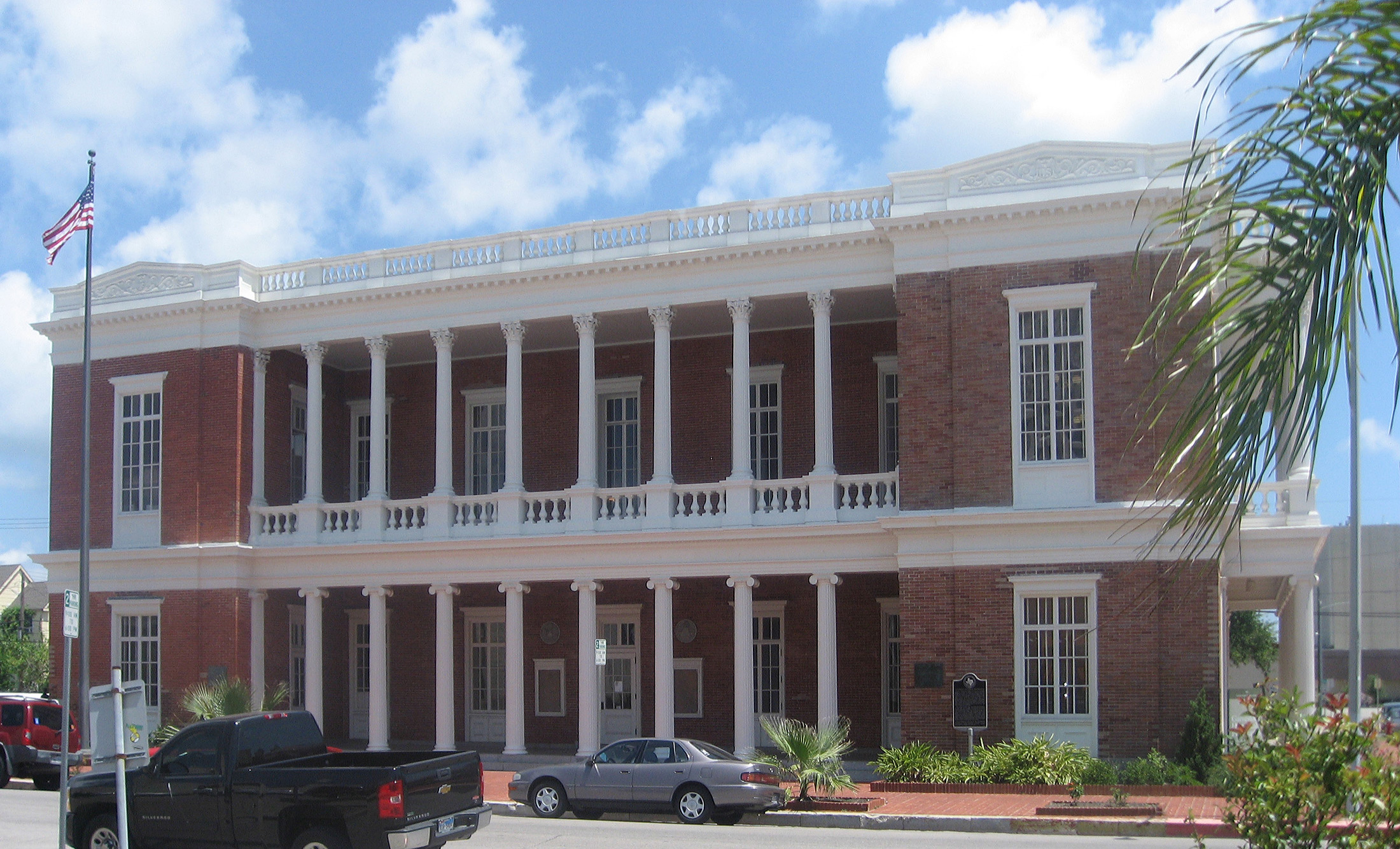
Old Galveston Customhouse

- 1857–1859: Supervising Architect of the Treasury Ammi B. Young produces the original design for the U.S. Custom House.
- 1860–1861: U.S. Custom House is constructed based on the redesign by local superintendents Charles B. Cluskey and E.W. Moore.
- 1865: Occupied by the Confederate Army, the building is the site of the ceremony ending the Civil War in Galveston. The U.S. Customs Service resumes occupancy.
- June 19, 1865: General Order No. 3 read at the United States Customhouse and Courthouse by General Granger.
- 1900: The U.S. Custom House is damaged by the Galveston Hurricane.
- 1917–1918: A courtroom is created on the second floor for use by the Federal Courts.
- 1967: Following the repair of extensive damages caused by Hurricane Carla, the building is formally rededicated on June 17.
- 1970: The U.S. Custom House is listed in the National Register of Historic Places.
- 1978: A boiler explosion damages the building and the second floor is closed.
- 1998–1999: A public-private partnership results in the restoration and use of the building by the Galveston Historical Foundation.
- July 2023: Shaun & Natalie Hodge purchase the 1861 Courthouse and Customhouse and begin the process of restoring the building for the use of the Hodge Law Firm, PLLC.

== Building facts ==
- Architects: Original design by Ammi B. Young, Supervising Architect of the Treasury
- Revised, executed design by Charles B. Cluskey and E.W. Moore, and David Watson Architect and Associates.
- Construction Dates: 1860–1861
- Landmark Status: Listed in the National Register of Historic Places
- Location: 502 Twentieth Street
- Architectural Style: Classical Revival
- Primary Materials: Brick and cast iron
- Prominent Features: Two-story galleries

== See also ==
- National Register of Historic Places listings in Galveston County, Texas

== Bibliography ==
- Beasley, Ellen; Fox, Stephen (1996). Galveston Architectural Guidebook. Houston: Rice University Press. ISBN 0-89263-345-X.
