= Sorrel–Weed House =

House in Savannah, Georgia, US

The Old Sorrel–Weed House Museum
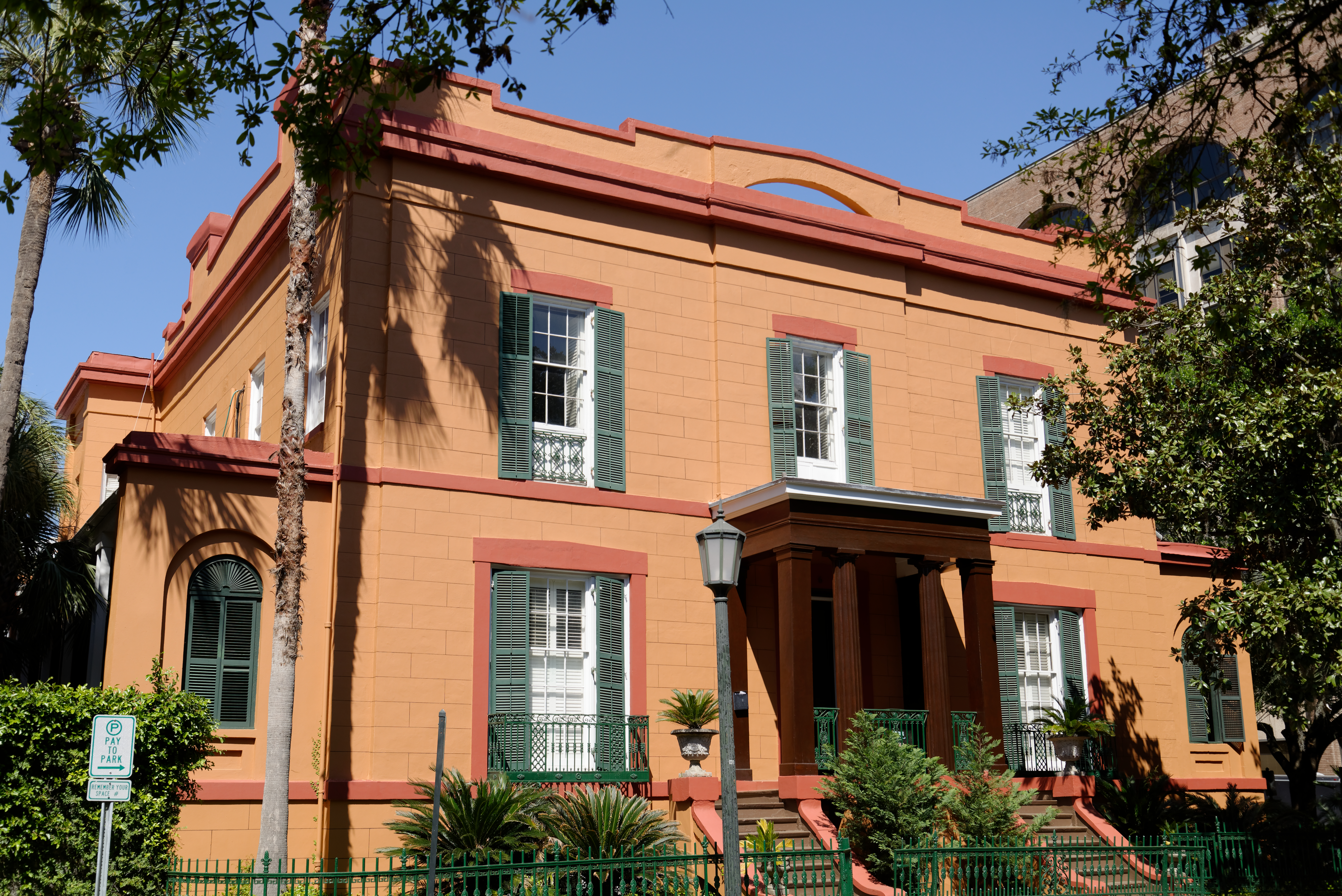
- Interactive map of the The Old Sorrel–Weed House Museum area
- Former names: Sorrel House

General information
- Location: 6 West Harris Street, Madison Square, Savannah, Georgia
- Coordinates: 32.07412°N 81.09405°W
- Construction started: 1835
- Completed: 1840

Design and construction
- Architect: Charles B. Cluskey
- Sorrel–Weed House
- U.S. National Historic Landmark District – Contributing property
- Part of: Savannah Historic District (ID66000277)
- Added to NRHP: 1966-11-13

The Old Sorrel–Weed House Museum, or the Francis Sorrel House, is a historic landmark in Savannah, Georgia located at 6 West Harris Street in Savannah, Georgia. It represents one of the finest examples of Greek Revival and Regency architecture in Savannah and was one of the first two homes in the State of Georgia to be made a State Landmark in 1954. At 10,000 square feet, it is also one of the largest houses in the city. The Sorrel–Weed House was first opened to the public in January 1940 by the Society for the Preservation of Savannah Landmarks. It was the society's first exhibit and was called "The Society for the Preservation of Savannah Landmarks Presents a loan Exhibit of Furniture and Fine Arts 18th and 19th Centuries at the Sorrel-Weed House on Madison Square: Jan-April 1940." This society later became the Historic Savannah Foundation. The Sorrel–Weed House was opened again to the public in 2005 and conducts Historical & Architectural Tours during the day and Historical Ghost Tours inside the house every evening. These tours are conducted by the Old Sorrel–Weed House Museum.

The Old Sorrel–Weed House Museum was the boyhood home of Brigadier General Moxley Sorrel, who fought for the Confederate States of America during the Civil War. He served under General James Longstreet, and after the War wrote "Recollections of a Confederate Staff Officer", considered to be one of the top postwar accounts written. General Robert E. Lee visited the home in late 1861 and early 1862. He and Francis Sorrel had been friends since the early 1830s. Lee also visited the Sorrel family in April 1870, shortly before his death.

A.J. Cohen Sr., a prominent Savannah businessman, bought the Sorrel-Weed house in 1941. The Cohen family lived in the home for more than 50 years. A.J. Cohen Jr. built a brick addition to the house and opened Lady Jane, an upscale women's clothing store which thrived in Savannah for decades. The store closed in 1991, and the home was bought by Stephen Bader in 1996. Bader removed the brick addition soon after his purchase.

The opening scene of the 1994 film Forrest Gump was filmed from the rooftop of the Sorrel–Weed House and is a popular tourist stop. The scene, which begins with a floating feather through the Savannah sky, pans the rooftops of other buildings occupying Madison Square as seen from the very top of the Sorrel–Weed home. The scene is then spliced to a scene of another church located on Chippewa square, where ultimately, Forrest is seen sitting on a bench.

The house was investigated by TAPS during a special 2005 Halloween Special episode of Ghost Hunters. The house was also featured on HGTV's "If Walls Could Talk" in March 2006. It was also investigated by the Ghost Adventures crew in 2014. The house was featured on the Travel Channel's "The Most Terrifying Places in America" in 2010, and on the Paula Deen Network in 2015. The home was also featured on the series Buzzfeed Unsolved: Supernatural being investigated by Ryan Bergara and Shane Madej.

The house is a contributing property to the Savannah Historic District.

== History ==
The Old Sorrel–Weed House Museum was designed by famous Georgia architect Charles Cluskey, who moved to Savannah in 1829 from New York City, where it is believed he apprenticed under the architectural firm of Town and Davis. Cluskey also designed the old Governor's Mansion in Milledgeville. The house was built for Francis Sorrel (1793–1870), a wealthy shipping merchant and esteemed citizen of Savannah. Sorrel owned between three and eleven enslaved individuals per year throughout his life. Sorrel transported several enslaved individuals and sold Minda, Louisa, and Virginia, two enslaved women and one ten-month-old child, to enslavers in Savannah. Sorrel was a guardian to multiple free women of color, including Leah Stephens, Betsey Stephens, Leah Williams, and Elizabeth Williams. One of his sons was General Gilbert Moxley Sorrel (1838–1901), one of the youngest generals in the Confederate army. In 1859, a purchase agreement was made by the prominent Savannah businessman, Henry D. Weed; he took possession of the house in 1862 and it remained in the Weed family until 1914.

The Old Sorrel–Weed House Museum has a reputation for being one of the most haunted buildings in Savannah. Two of the most prominent stories involve Francis Sorrel's wife Matilda, who committed suicide, and Molly, his 16-year-old enslaved servant. According to one history of urban American slavery, "All evidence suggests that Molly...was brutally raped and murdered." There are no historical records associated with the Sorrel family that mention an enslaved woman named Molly. Although this story is fictional, it reflects the horrors of sexual abuse that enslaved women faced during this period. Archaeological excavations of a depression in the floor of the carriage house debunk the belief that the remains of an enslaved individual were buried under the floor. The depression was created by a trash pit containing a variety of artifacts, including faunal remains, metal objects, glass, ceramics, and personal possessions. The Sorrel–Weed House was featured in the Wall Street Journal in 2009 due to its haunted reputation. USAToday's "10best" website listed the Old Sorrel–Weed House Museum as a top ten Halloween travel destination. Disney's Babble listed the Old Sorrel–Weed house Museum as the fifth-most haunted place in the United States in a 2013 article. Condé Nast wrote that Savannah is one of the eight best cities to visit at Halloween, citing the Sorrel–Weed House's reputation for paranormal activity as "a great way to spend Halloween."

== Architectural style ==
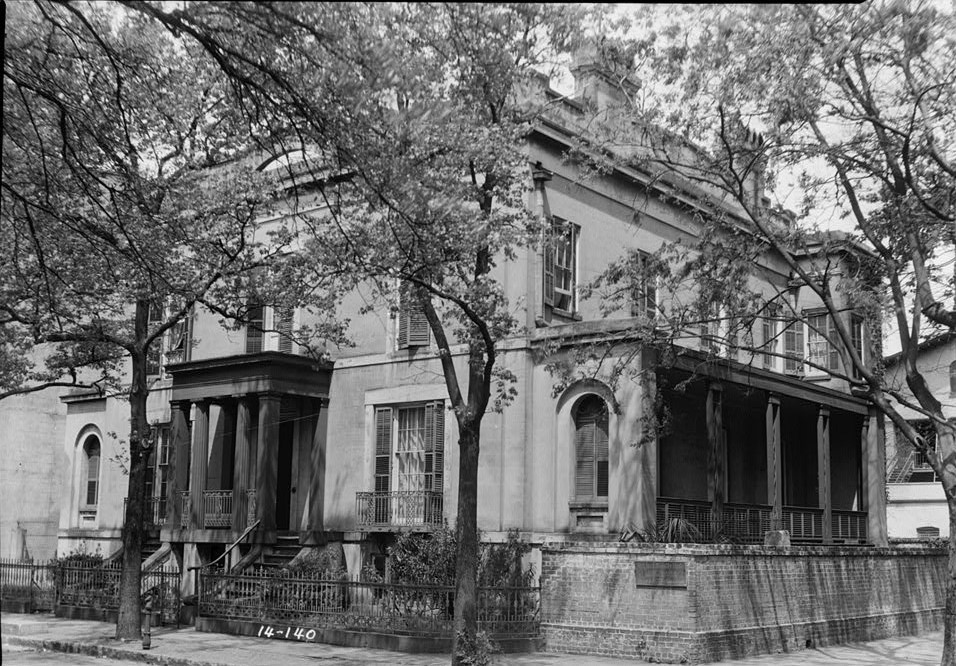
The house in the mid-20th century

The National Trust Guide to Historic Places makes architectural comparisons between the Old Sorrel–Weed House Museum, Thomas Jefferson's Monticello, and William Jay's Owens-Thomas House in Savannah. Although clearly a Greek Revival house, English Regency influences are prominent.

The Savannah College of Art and Design hosted the 28th annual meeting of the Vernacular Architecture Forum in 2007. Themed as "Savannah and the Lowcountry", architects and historians from around the world gathered to document and categorize houses of Savannah and the Lowcountry. The Sorrel–Weed House was included in "Colonial Williamsburg's Picks", "The Caribbean Tour: Is Savannah in the Caribbean, Is the Caribbean in Savannah?", and was listed as one of the houses chosen in the Conference Committee Favorites. Ghost adventures should also investigate this place .

Willie Graham, the Curator of Architecture at the Colonial Williamsburg Foundation, came to the house and drew detailed blueprints during the conference. He also wrote a lengthy and quite detailed article on the Sorrel–Weed House in the 450-page Vernacular Architecture Forum Field Guide compiled at the Forum conference. He confirmed in his article that the Victorian stairway that was demolished in 1999 was indeed a late 19th-century addition by the Weed family, and the original Sorrel stairway was originally quite similar to the 1999 recreation.

The stairway built for the Sorrel family mimics the Regency Owens-Thomas House stairway, designed earlier in 1816 by Regency architect William Jay in Savannah. This is a center stairway ascending to a mid-floor stoop, from which one can walk to the left or right to ascend to the second floor.

A common device used by both William Jay and Charles Cluskey in Savannah architecture was the division of space in a foyer by two columns, intended to differentiate between guest space and private family space. Cluskey's use of this device was more indirect than William Jay's use in the Owens-Thomas House. Cluskey designed a small space between the front door and the two columns where guests would wait to be greeted, after which they could enter the double foyer, library, and the main length of the foyer. The Owens-Thomas House has these columns much closer to the stairway leading to the second floor, where public and private spaces were more clearly separated.

An interesting observation made by Mr. Graham was that the Sorrel dining room was intended for private family use only. Mr. Graham also confirmed to staff that a wall which was torn down in 1999 was a late 19th-century addition by the Weed family, and the columns that were recreated in the place of the wall were as the Sorrel family had them originally. Mr. Graham discusses these columns in his article.

== See also ==
- Savannah Historic District
