= Jean de Bérard-Moquet-Montalet =

French nobleman (1762–1814)

- Born: 26 January 1762
- Died: 3 June 1814 (aged 52); Sapelo Island, Georgia, U.S.
- Resting place: High Point Cemetery, Sapelo Island, Georgia, U.S.
- Occupation: Planter
- Spouse(s): Renee Michel Mirault; Angélique Servanne Charlotte de Picot-Boisfeuillet

Jean de Bérard-Moquet-Montalet, Chevalier Marquise de Montalent (26 January 1762 – 3 June 1814) was a French nobleman who became noted for his production of the noted "Savannah Grey" bricks at the Hermitage Plantation, near Savannah, Georgia, where he was also a planter.

== Life and career ==
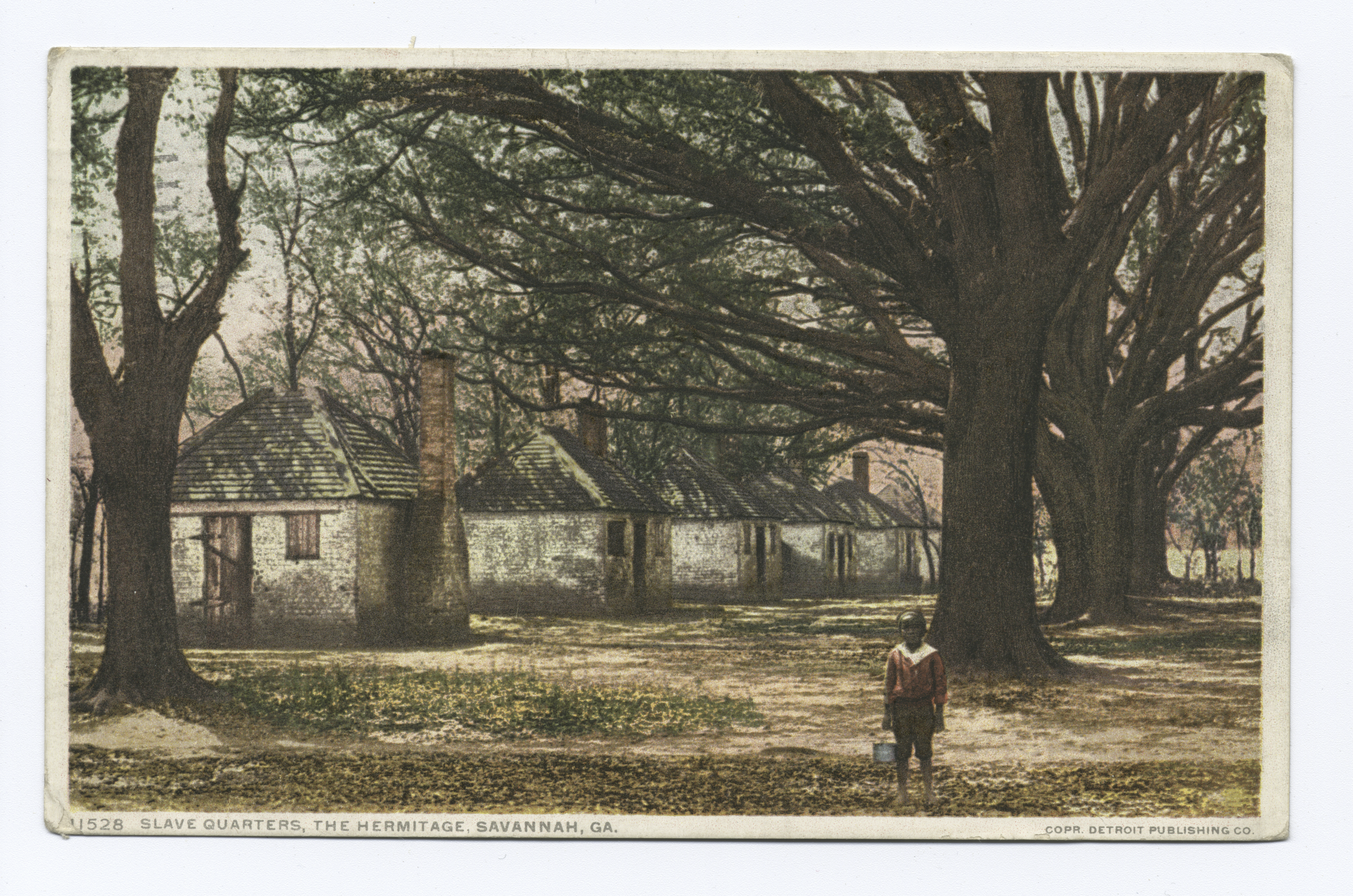
Slave quarters in Hermitage plantation

Bérard-Moquet-Montalet was born in 1762 to Jean-Baptiste Mocquet and Louise Gaillard, natives of Nantes, France. He was raised in Paris. He had one sister, Lucie Mocquet de Montalet, and one brother, William Polycarp Montalet.

He married Renee Michel Mirault in France.

Between 1794 and 1798, he commanded a militia in Saint-Domingue under English rule.

In around 1798, with a handful of slaves, he moved to Savannah, Georgia. He gave the slaves French names, including Mathurin, Dominique, Prene, Gustin, Antoine and St. Foix. Shortly after arrival, he purchased the 230-acre (93 ha) Hermitage Plantation, from Patrick Mackay, and a section of the northeastern part of Sapelo Island, where his father-in-law, Peter M. I. Mirault, had been living. He continued the plantation's brick-making history, producing more of the much-sought-after "Savannah Grey" bricks which were used in Savannah's buildings. He later spent more time on Sapelo Island and sold the Hermitage to his brother.

Bérard-Moquet-Montalet became a widower around 1802. In 1804, he married Angélique Servanne Charlotte de Picot-Boisfeuillet. She died the following year.

== Death ==
Bérard-Moquet-Montalet died in 1814, aged 52. He was interred in High Point Cemetery on Sapelo Island, Georgia.
