= Charles B. Cluskey =

Irish-born American architect

Charles Blaney Cluskey (ca. 1808 – January 1871) was an Irish architect active from the 1830s to the start of the Civil War, and therefore he is recognised as an antebellum architect. He is reputed to be the initiator of the Greek Revival-style in the south, and his commissions, both public and private, can still be seen in Augusta, Milledgeville and Savannah, Georgia.

== Early life ==
Born in Ireland, Cluskey emigrated to the United States in 1827, landing in New York City, where he trained with the architectural firm Town and Davis. He moved to Savannah in 1829, where he undertook his first solo-commission, the Hermitage Plantation house, in 1830, now demolished.

== Career ==
The Old Medical College, built in 1837, was Cluskey's first major commission and the first example of the Greek Revival style that would be his trademark. The Old Medical College is considered "one of his masterpieces". It is based on the Villa Capra "La Rotonda".

In 1839, he completed the Governor's Mansion, also based on the Villa Capra, and the main building for Oglethorpe University in 1840. The National Register nomination document for the mansion asserts that: "His works gained recognition because they were a direct departure from the more conservative designs of rectangular shapes that had been generally used in domestic architecture," and that the building is "without question, his most perfect example of the Greek Revival house.

In the 1840 and 50s, Cluskey moved to private commissions in Savannah, three houses still existing in what is now the Savannah Historic District. Notable examples existing in Savannah today are the Harper Fowlkes House and Sorrel-Weed Houses.

In 1845 he was elected Savannah city surveyor.

He moved to Washington, D.C., in 1847. He later provided input on planned additions to the Executive Mansion, but his suggestions were not implemented.

In 1869 Cluskey moved back to Savannah. In the aftermath of the Civil War, he was commissioned to rebuild the St. Simons Island Light.

=== Selected works ===
- Hermitage Plantation house (1830), Savannah, Georgia (demolished)
- Medical College of Georgia (1834–1837), Augusta, Georgia
- Oglethorpe University (1837–1840), near Milledgeville, Georgia
- Governor's Mansion (1837–1839), Milledgeville, Georgia
- Cluskey Embankment Stores (1840–1844), Savannah, Georgia
- Harper Fowlkes House (1844), Savannah, Georgia
- St. Vincent's Academy (1845), Savannah, Georgia
- Sorrel–Weed House (1853), Savannah, Georgia
- Philbrick–Eastman House (1853), Savannah, Georgia
- Mills House (1855), Griffin, Georgia
- U.S. Customs House and Court House (1861), Galveston, Texas
- St. Simons Island Light and keeper's residence (1869), St. Simons Island, Georgia

== Death ==
He died, from malaria, in January 1871, before completing the St. Simons Island Light.

== Gallery ==
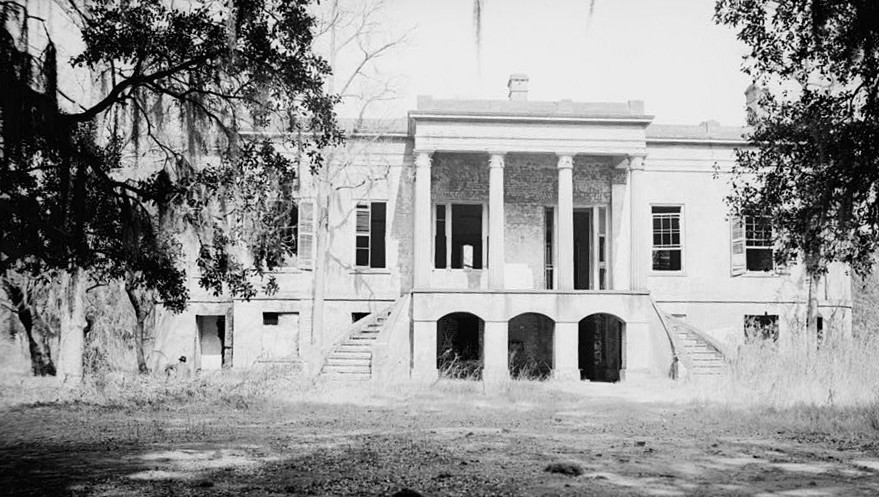
Hermitage Plantation house (1830), Savannah

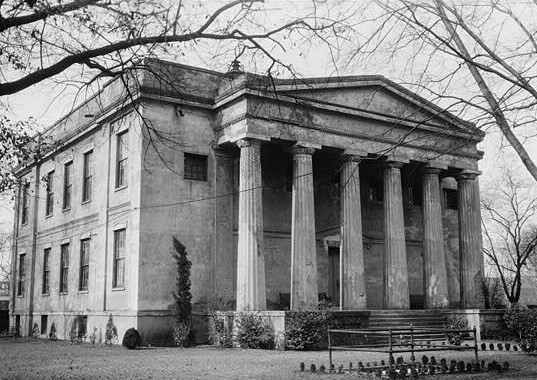
Medical College of Georgia (later Georgia Health Sciences University) (1834-37), Augusta

Oglethorpe University (1837-40), Baldwin County near Milledgeville

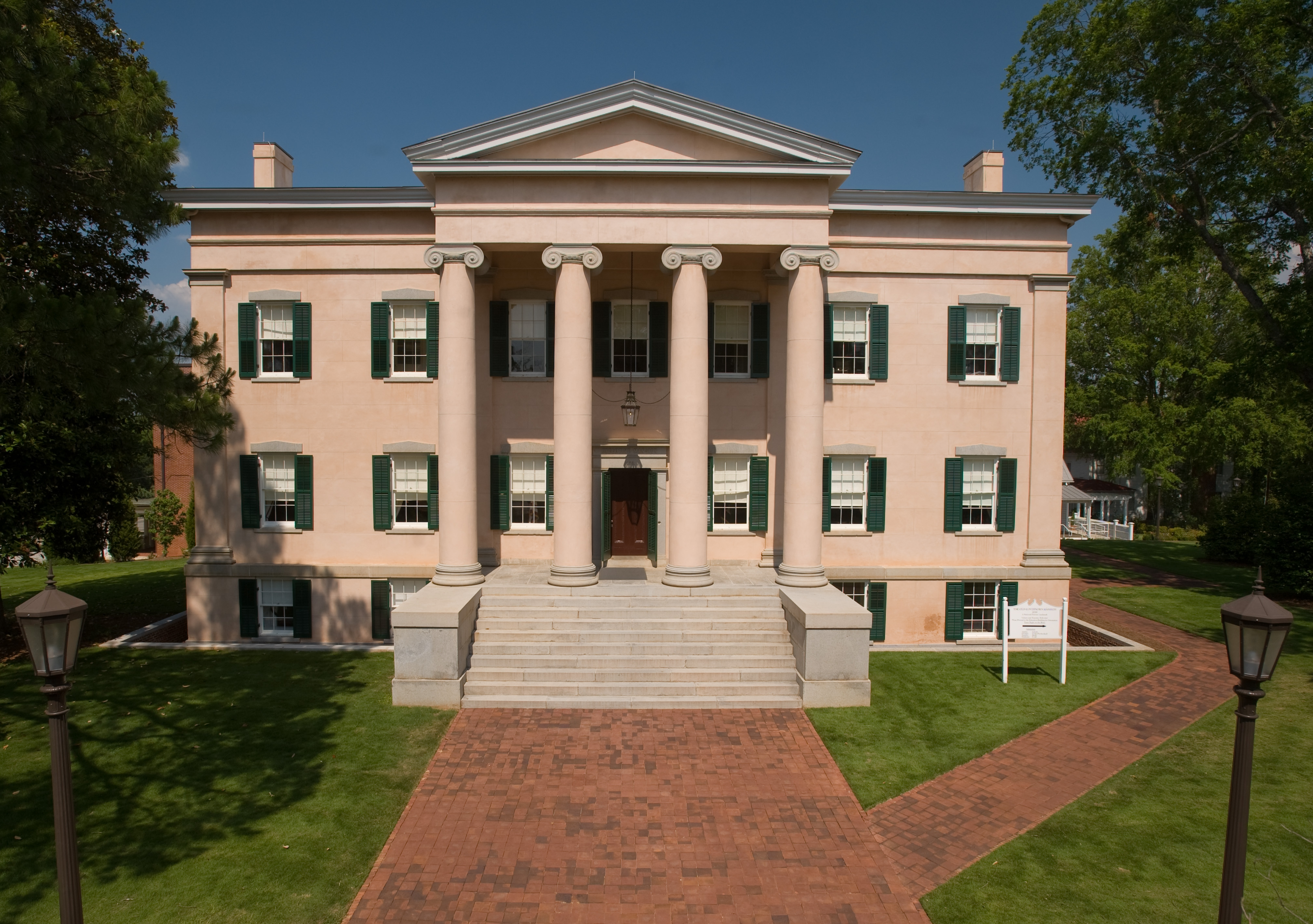
Governor's Mansion (1837-39), Milledgeville

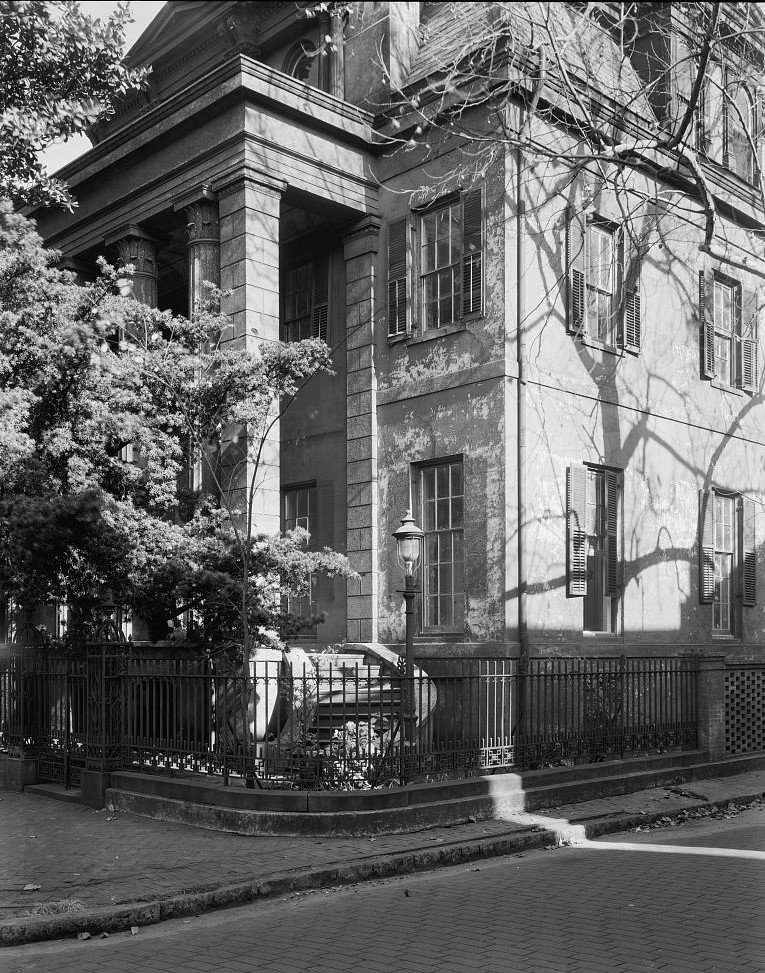
Champion-McAlpin-Fowlkes House (1844), Savannah

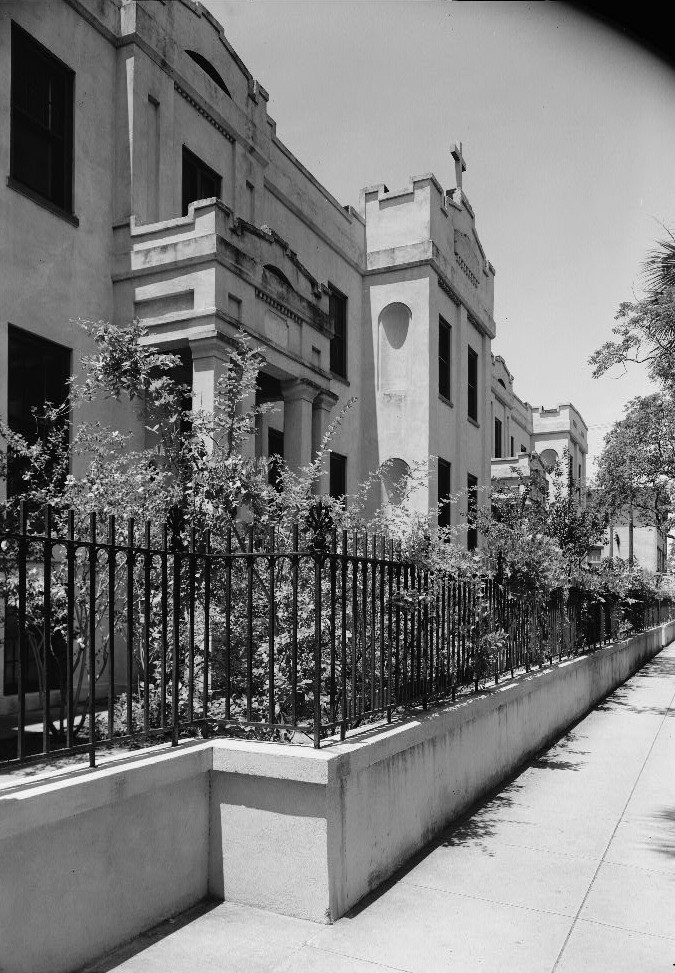
St. Vincent's Academy (1845), Savannah

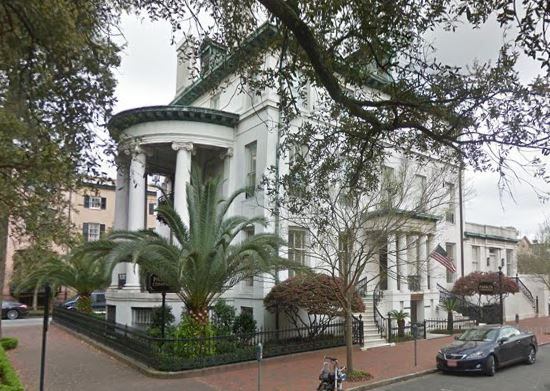
Philbrick-Eastman House (1853), Savannah

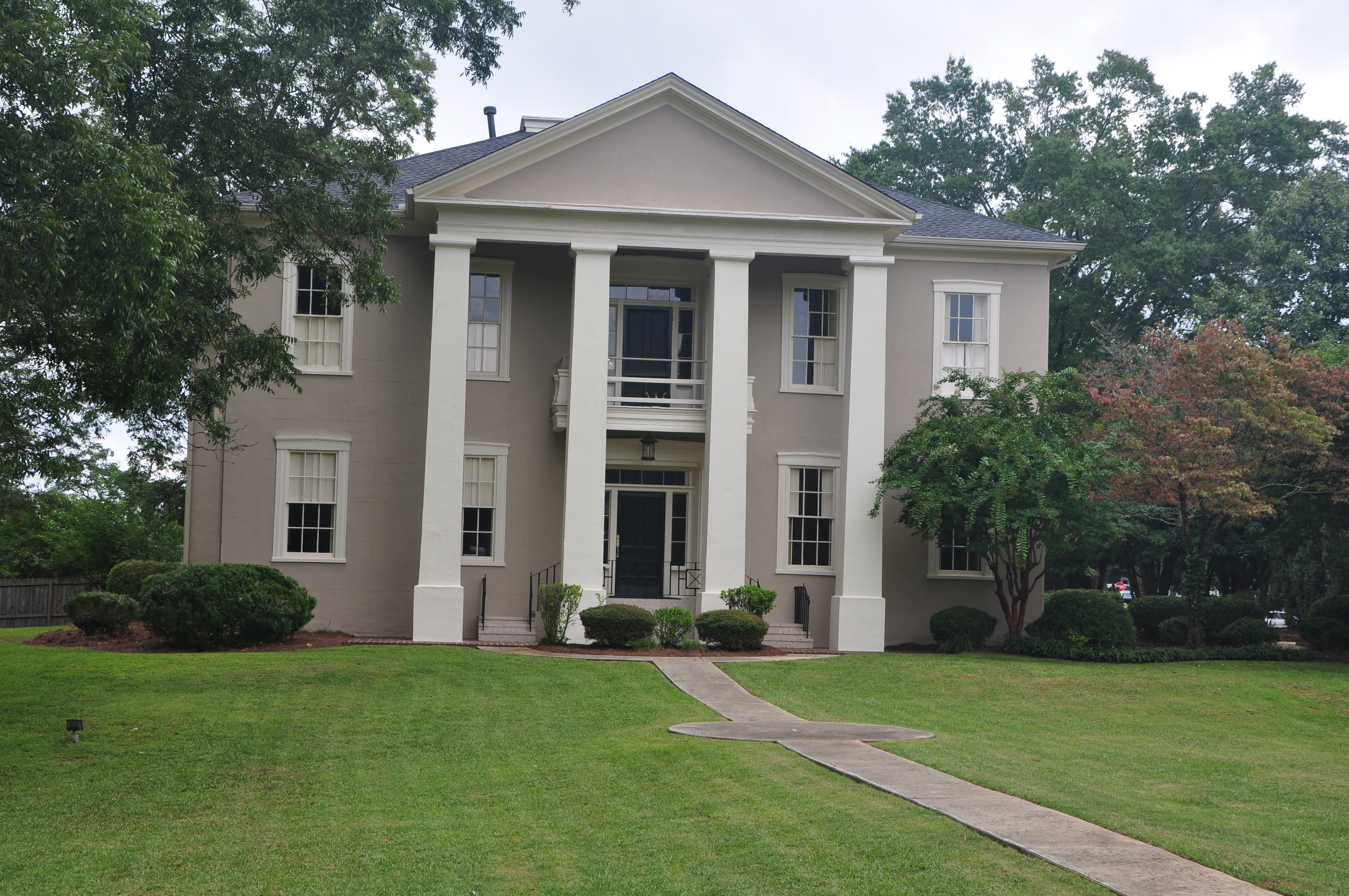
Mills House (1855), Griffin

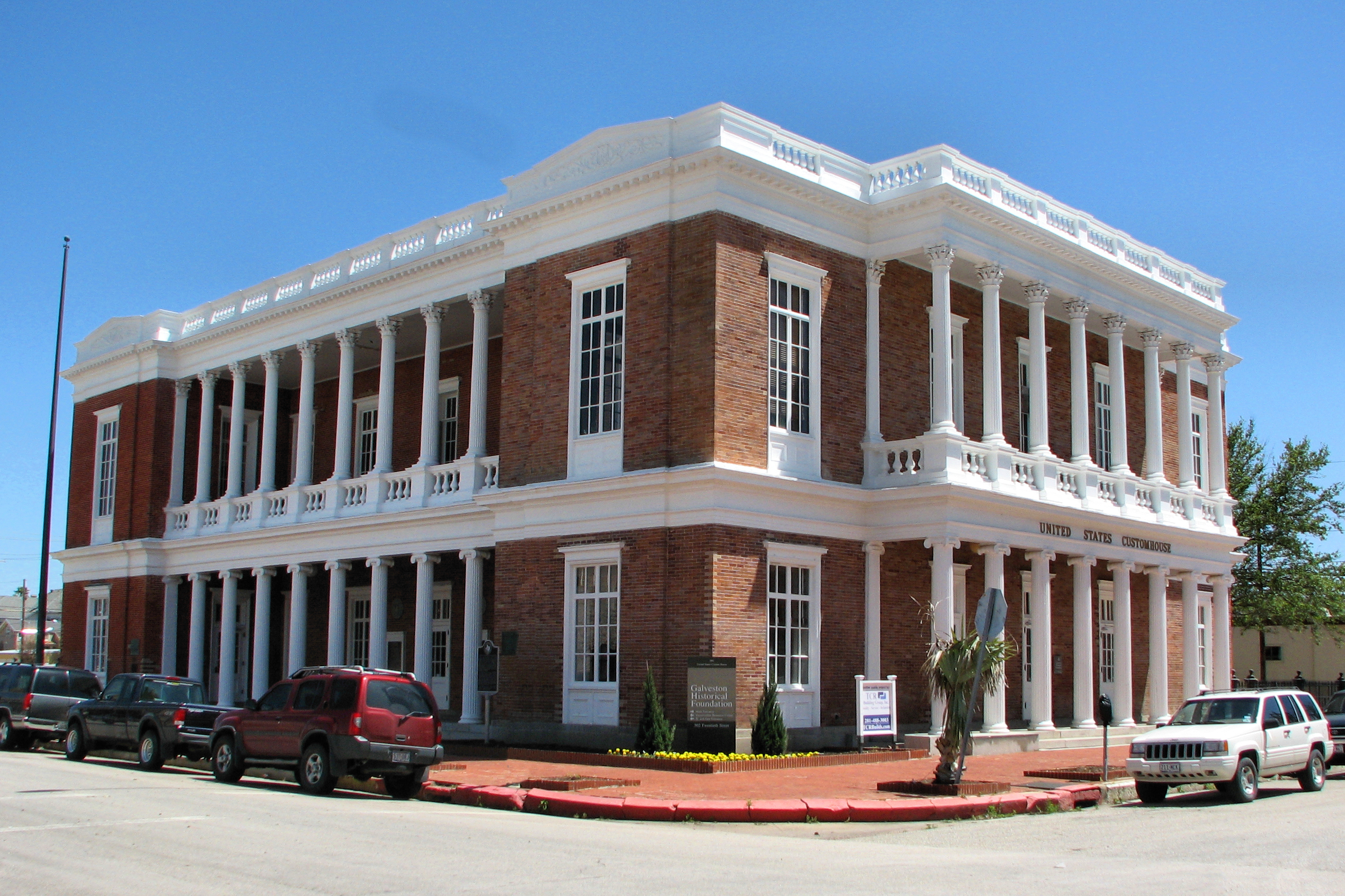
U.S. Customs House and Court House (1861), Galveston

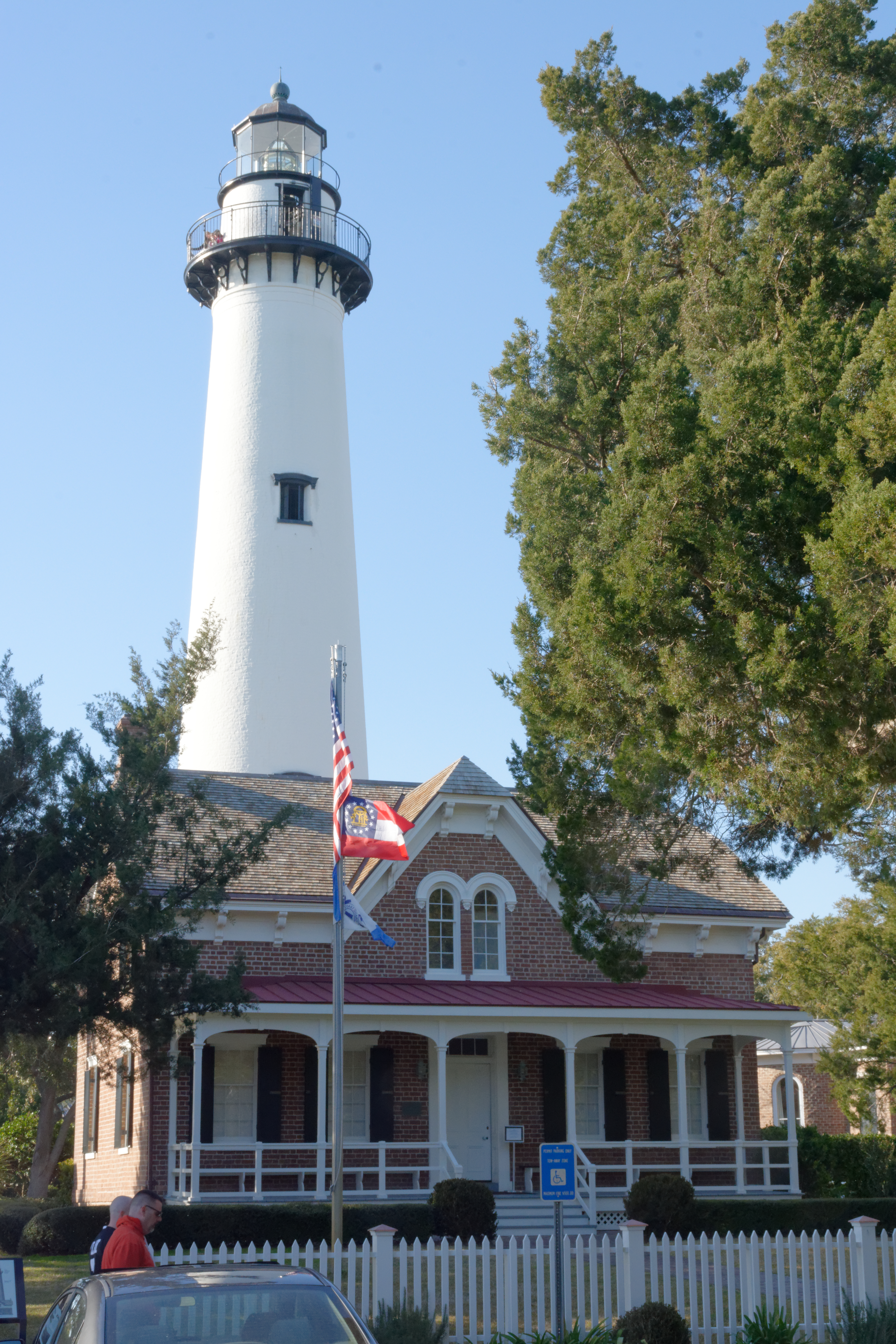
St. Simons Island Light and keeper's residence (1869), St. Simons Island

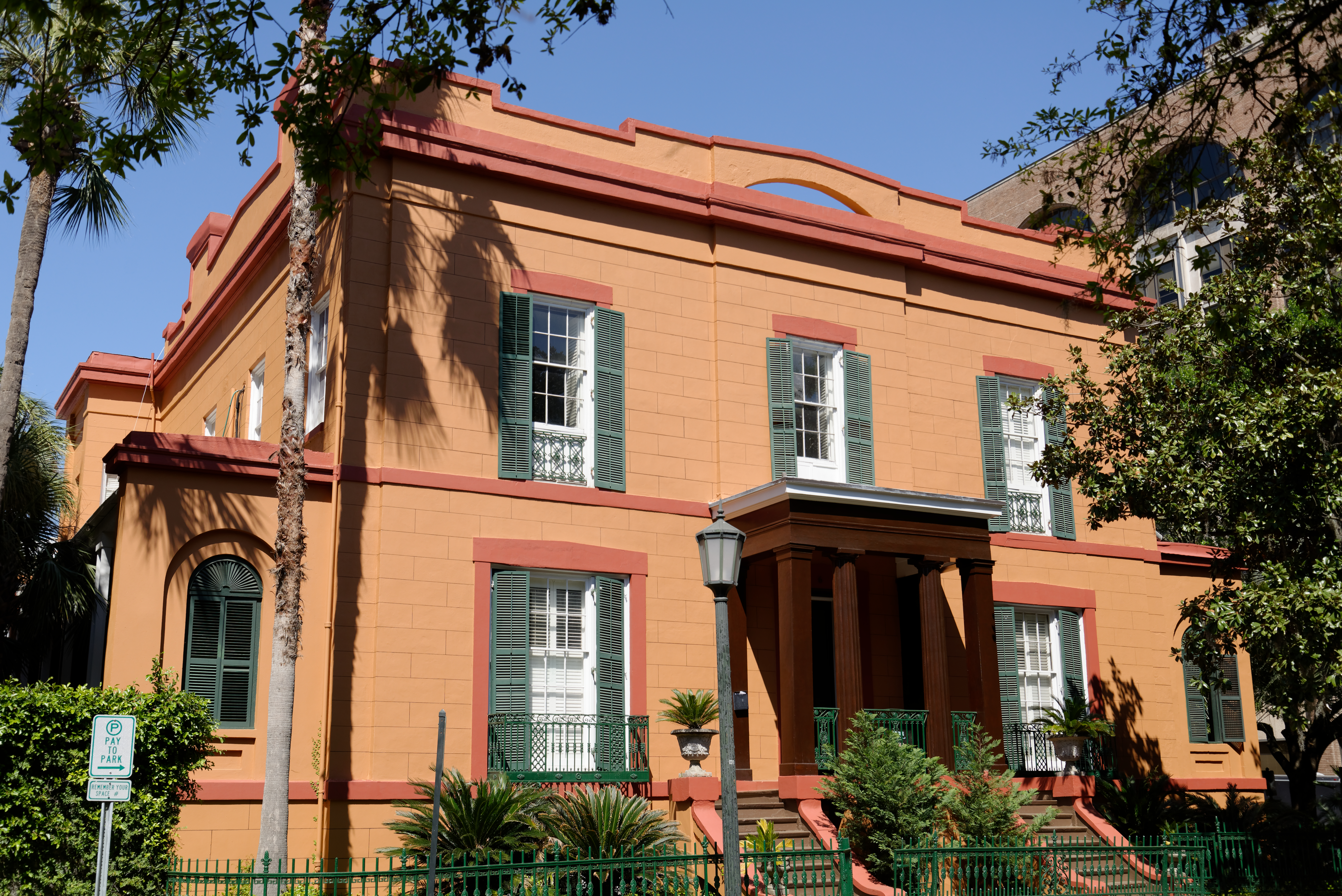
Sorrel–Weed House (1853), Savannah
