= Archibald Bulloch Jr. =

American businessman (1775–1859)

- Born: 1775; Province of Georgia, colonial America
- Died: March 8, 1859 (aged 83–84); Savannah, Georgia, U.S.
- Spouse: Sarah Glen (m. 1793–1859; his death)

Archibald Stobo Bulloch Jr. (1775 – March 8, 1859) was an American businessman, prominent in Savannah, Georgia, known for being a commission agent, factor and Collector of Customs for the Port of Savannah.

== Life and career ==
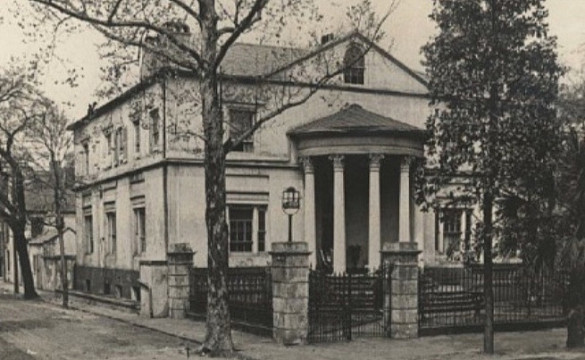
The now-demolished Bulloch–Habersham House in Savannah, Georgia

Bulloch was born in 1775 to politician Archibald Bulloch Sr. and Mary De Veaux. He was their second child of four, after James and before Jane and William. Archibald Sr. died the same year as William's birth.

In 1793, Bulloch married Sarah Glen.

Bulloch served as Collector of Customs for the Port of Savannah between 1810 and 1822, during which he fought in the War of 1812. William and James were captains in the conflict. Archibald was also a Justice in the Inferior Court.

In 1820, Bulloch had built what became known as the Bulloch–Habersham House in Savannah's Orleans Square. Designed by noted English architect William Jay, it stood for just under a century, having been demolished in 1916 to make way for the Savannah Civic Center.

== Death ==
Bulloch died in 1859, aged 83 or 84. He was interred in Savannah's Laurel Grove Cemetery. His widow survived him for one month, and was interred beside Bulloch.
