= William Jay =

William Jay may refer to:

- William Jay (minister) (1769–1853), English nonconformist minister
- William Jay (architect) (1792–1837), English architect who also worked in America, son of the minister
- William Jay (jurist) (1789–1858), American reformer, jurist, and the son of Founding Father and first U.S. Supreme Court Chief Justice John Jay (1745–1829)
- William Jay (colonel) (died 1915), colonel in the US Army and vice president of the New York Herald
- Bill Jay (1940-2009), English photographer and writer who also lived in America
