= Raid on Tybee Island =

1776 American Revolutionary War raid

- Part of the American Revolutionary War
Date	March 25, 1776
Location	Tybee Island, Province of Georgia 32°00′27″N 80°50′42″W
Result	Georgian victory

Belligerents
(United States) Province of Georgia	Great Britain

Commanders and leaders
Archibald Bulloch	Unknown

Strength
70 to 130 (40 to 100 militiamen and 30 Creek soldiers)	Unknown

Casualties and losses
Up to 1 dead	Up to 3 killed (2 marines and 1 Loyalist); Several captured (including 12 to 13 runaway slaves, 1 marine, and several Loyalists)

On March 25, 1776, Archibald Bulloch, a Patriot military leader in the Province of Georgia, led a force of several dozen militiamen, alongside about 30 Creek soldiers, in a raid on the British-controlled Tybee Island during the American Revolutionary War. The primary goal of the raid was to capture runaway slaves who had fled to the island seeking refuge with the British. The raid resulted in the capture of about a dozen runaway slaves, alongside several white Loyalists and one British marine.

In late 1775, following the issuing of Dunmore's Proclamation, a large number of enslaved people in the Thirteen Colonies began to seek refuge with the British. In the Province of South Carolina, a large number amassed on Sullivan's Island, which was protected by a British fleet. However, in December of that year, a Patriot force, fearful of this community, raided the island. In the Province of Georgia, a similar situation was occurring on Tybee Island, located at the mouth of the Savannah River downstream of the port city of Savannah, Georgia, where an estimated several hundred slaves had amassed. While stationed in Savannah, Stephen Bull, a colonel in the Continental Army from South Carolina, wrote to Henry Laurens, a local Patriot leader in South Carolina, to discuss a raid on Tybee Island similar to the one that had occurred on Sullivan's Island. In their correspondence, Bull suggested capturing runaway slaves and massacring any whom they could not capture. Laurens gave his support to the plan, which was largely kept secret due to the sensitive nature of the military operation.

The raid was largely successful for the Patriot forces, with the only casualty on their side being a Creek soldier who was killed during a drunken fight with a militiaman. Meanwhile, several on the British side were killed. Historians are unsure as to whether or not the proposed massacre ever occurred. In the immediate aftermath of the raid, the British stationed near Savannah agreed to a prisoner exchange. Concerning the larger trend of runaway slaves seeking refuge with the British, multiple historians have highlighted the role that that has played in swaying Patriots towards seeking independence from Great Britain, with references to British-supported slave rebellions being made in both South Carolina's state constitution and the United States Declaration of Independence (both ratified after the raid in 1776).

== Runaway slaves during the American Revolutionary War ==
In November 1775, amidst the developing American Revolutionary War, Lord Dunmore, the royal governor of the Colony of Virginia, issued a proclamation stating that enslaved black people who left their masters and agreed to fight for the British against the rebellious North American colonies would be freed. Over the next several weeks, news of the proclamation spread through the colonies. In the Province of Maryland, the royal governor offered asylum to slaves who could reach a British ship, while in the Province of North Carolina, runaway slaves presented themselves for British military service before a fleet that had been stationed at the mouth of the Cape Fear River. While Dunmore had been the only British official to explicitly extend emancipation to slaves, many assumed that they would be freed if they aligned with the British and served in a military capacity. As a result, during the war, the number of runaway slaves increased, with many attempting to flee to the British who offered them safe haven, and this was a major concern to Patriots. Expressing their fears of a possible slave revolt in correspondence with John Adams in September 1775, Archibald Bulloch and John Houstoun, members of the Second Continental Congress from the Province of Georgia, said that if "one thousand regular troops should land in Georgia, and their commander be provided with arms and clothes enough, and proclaim freedom to all the negroes who would join his campaign, twenty thousand would join it from [Georgia and South Carolina] in a fortnight".

== Raid on Sullivan's Island ==
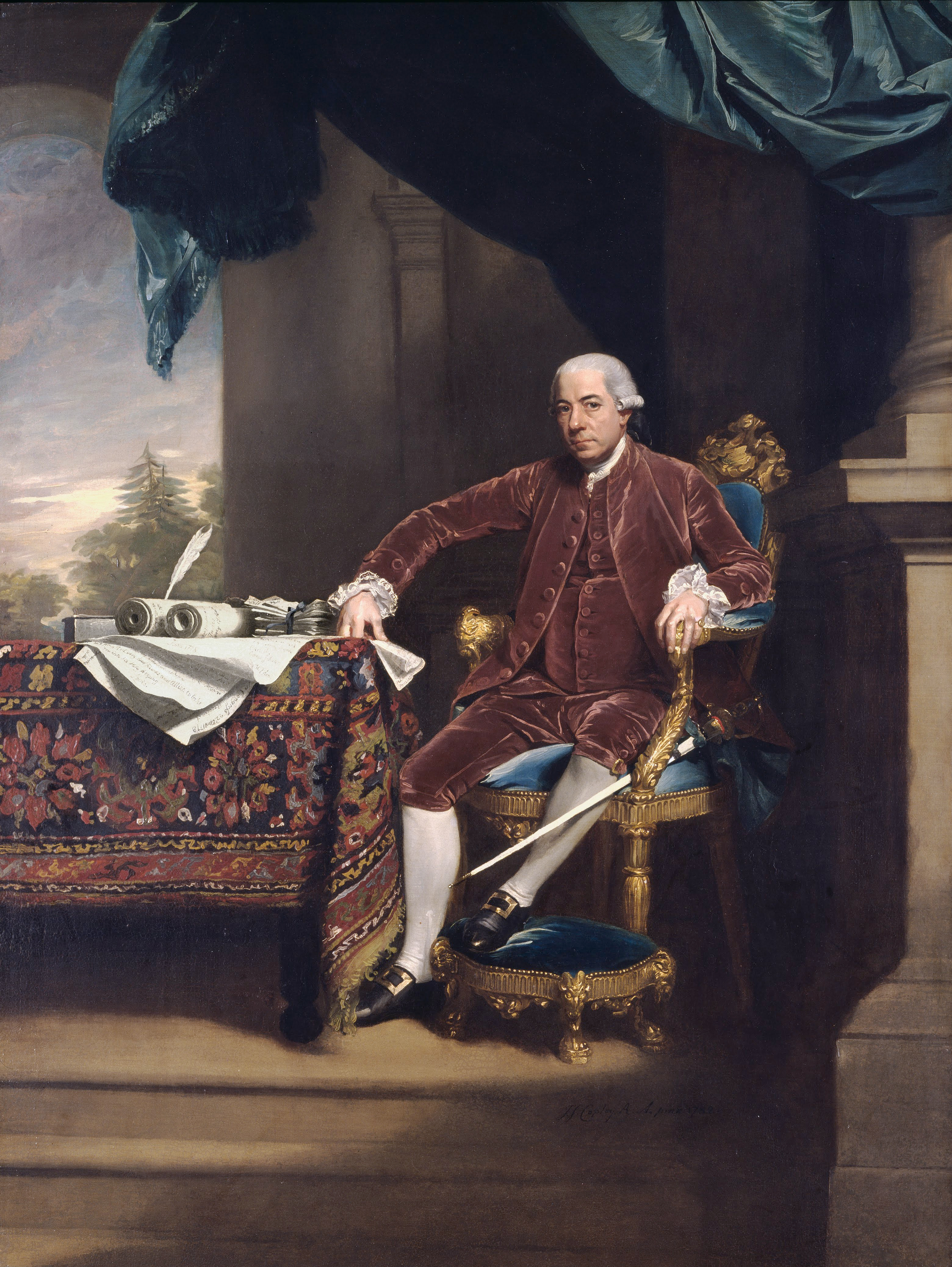
Henry Laurens (pictured 1782) was a Patriot leader in South Carolina who served as the chair for the local Council of Safety.

By December, news of the proclamation had reached the Province of South Carolina. Several hundred runaway slaves fled to Sullivan's Island, in the harbor of Charles Town, (Note: The city of Charleston, South Carolina, was known as "Charles Town" during the American Revolution. It was officially renamed to "Charleston" in 1783.) where they developed a community that was supported by South Carolina's royal governor, Lord William Campbell, and protected by British warships that were stationed nearby. Some of these runaway slaves also participated in raids on the mainland orchestrated by the British forces. By the end of 1775, there were about 500 runaway slaves living on Sullivan's Island. Henry Laurens, a local merchant and slave trader who supported the Patriot cause and was the chairman of the local Council of Safety, was vehemently opposed to the situation, as he and other Patriots believed that it threatened the safety of the city and could encourage further runaways. On December 7, Laurens and the council ordered Colonel William Moultrie of the state's militia to dispatch about 200 troops to the island "to seize and apprehend a number of negroes, who are said to have deserted to the enemy". This raid would be the first military offensive of the war to take place in eastern South Carolina.

Early in the morning of December 18, a Patriot military force of about 54 infantry troops, disguised as Native Americans, performed a raid on the island. In a council report on the raid, it was stated that the troops captured four black people, killed three or four others, and took ten white people as prisoners. However, in a later private letter written by Josiah Smith Jr., a merchant living in Charles Town at the time, he said that the troops had actually killed fifty black people who had resisted capture. Concerning the discrepancy, historian Peter H. Wood said, "If fifty unarmed black refugees had in fact been massacred, preferring death over re-enslavement, the Council of Safety probably would not commit such a gruesome fact to paper in its report. But its members ... were not afraid to sanction such brutality where their own chattels were concerned." In a 2008 book, historian Jon Sensbach estimated that the number of runaway slaves who were either recaptured or killed to be in the "hundreds". The day after the raid, Laurens stated that the military action would "serve to humble our Negroes in general & perhaps to mortify his Lordship not a little."

== Runaway slaves on Tybee Island ==
In January 1776, several of the British warships stationed in Charles Town departed from that harbor to other coastal cities. As it was feared that some were bound for Tybee Island, located at the mouth of the Savannah River near Savannah, Georgia, Laurens wrote to Bulloch to warn him and also directed Stephen Bull, a colonel in the Continental Army based in Beaufort, South Carolina, to lead a force of about 200 troops to Savannah to assist the Patriot forces there. Indeed, that month, British ships became stationed at the mouth of the river, using the buildings on Tybee Island for housing. As with Sullivan's Island in South Carolina, Tybee Island, with the British presence, became a rallying point for runaway slaves in the area. By March, the runaway slave community on Tybee, which historian Ray Raphael calls a "maroon community", numbered about 200. (Note: Multiple sources give the runaway slave population on Tybee Island as about 200. However, several sources estimate the population at between 200 and 300. Another puts the number at "up to 150".) Of these, about 65 had belonged to Arthur Middleton, a planter from South Carolina who would later become a signer of the United States Declaration of Independence.

As with the situation on Sullivan's Island, the runaway slave community on Tybee was a cause for concern amongst Patriots in Georgia. Lachlan McIntosh, a colonel in the Continental Army in Georgia, wrote to commander-in-chief George Washington that the British stationed at Tybee "were encouraging our slaves to Desert to them", while William Ewen, the president of Georgia's council of safety, wrote to the South Carolina Provincial Congress that the British forces were raiding plantations along the Savannah River and, among other things, had taken with them "a number of negroes". In early March, Patriot forces engaged the British in Savannah in the Battle of the Rice Boats. During the battle, Bulloch served under McIntosh.

== Planned military action ==
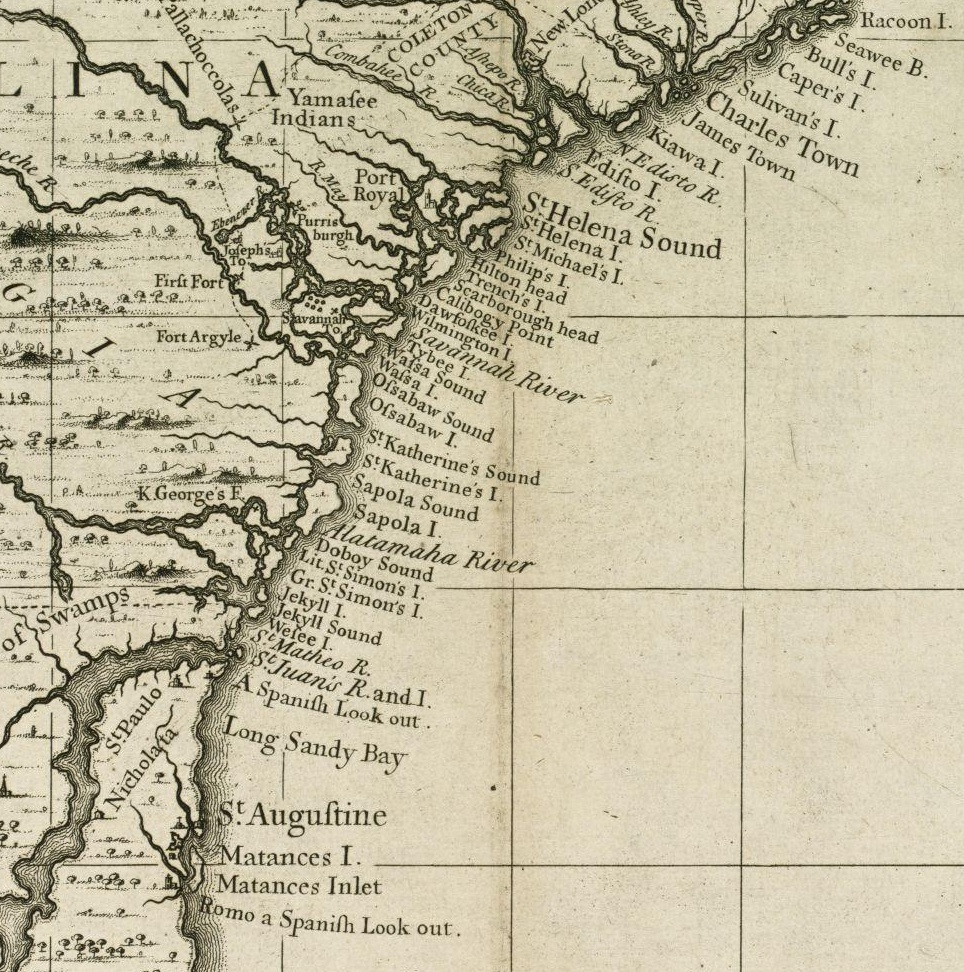
Map showing Savannah and Tybee Island in 1733

In early March, Bull arrived in Savannah with reinforcements from South Carolina. Shortly after his arrival, he learned of the runaway slave situation on Tybee Island and, on March 14, he wrote to Laurens with a plan to raid the island and capture the runaways, killing any who resisted. Bull argued that it would be better for the Patriot cause for the slaves to be killed than for the British to be able to resell them and apply those funds towards their war efforts. Additionally, as Bull wished to "establish a hatred or aversion between the Indians and negroes", he requested that he be allowed to employ a group of Creek people to participate in the raid. According to Bull, the plan to use Creeks in the raid was controversial among the Georgia Patriots, who he called "timid", though he stressed that there was a large force of Native American troops available for the raid in Savannah. According to Wood, it was the Georgia Council of Safety's lack of support that prompted Bull to seek support from Patriots in South Carolina for his planned mission. Due to the sensitive nature of the topic, in his letter, Bull urged that only Laurens and the rest of the Council of Safety be made aware of the plan, asking them not to share it with members of the Provincial Congress.

Laurens received this message on March 16. He penned a letter that night, calling the proposed massacre "an awful business", but nonetheless giving his support for the plan, recommending that white Patriots lead the company of Creek fighters. On behalf of the South Carolina Council of Safety, Laurens gave his approval for Bull to carry out his planned raid, further writing that the Georgia Council of Safety should lend him their support for the endeavor. Laurens penned this message around midnight on March 16, and he immediately sent a rider to deliver the letter to Bull. Historians disagree on when Laurens's letter reached Bull. Wood has stated that Bull received the letter only after leaving Savannah, on his return to Charles Town. Per Wood, Bull wrote to Laurens while stationed in Sheldon, South Carolina, that, had he received the letter "but twelve hours sooner", he would have remained in Savannah. However, according to historian William R. Ryan, Bull presumably received this letter within a week and began to discuss the matter with the Georgia Council of Safety. Per Ryan, on March 23, Bulloch, who had been appointed the leader for the raid, formulated a plan for the mission. Taking Laurens's advice, Bulloch had his white leaders of the Creeks disguise themselves as Native Americans by donning war paint.

== The raid ==
The raid on Tybee Island took place on March 25. The raiding party was led by Bulloch and included several dozen Patriot militiamen, (Note: Sources differ on how many militiamen participated in the raid. In a 2009 book, historian Ray Raphael gives the number as about 40. Meanwhile, historian William R. Ryan gives a figure of 70 in a 2010 book. In a 2001 book, historian Leslie Hall gives a range of between 50 and 100.) in addition to about 30 Creeks. They landed on the island at about 1 p.m. that day. Similar to the earlier raid on Sullivan's Island, exact details of the raid are scant, with Raphael stating that no firsthand accounts of the raid exist. The raiders burned down several structures on the island, including three houses that were being used by the runaway slaves. According to historian Charles Colcock Jones Jr., the raiders burned every house on the island except for one that was inhabited by a sick woman and several children. Upon seeing smoke from the fires, the captain of HMS Hinchinbrook fired two warning shots, while HMS Cherokee fired cannonballs and grapeshot during the entire course of the raid.

=== Conflicting details of the raid ===
Sources vary on many of the specific details regarding the raid, including the number of individuals who were injured, killed, or captured. According to Wood, one British marine was killed during the raid. However, other historians put the number of fatalities on the British side at three, constituting two marines and one Loyalist who refused to surrender. Either shortly before or after their deaths, the marines were scalped and had their legs broken, while the Loyalist, a shipwright, was shot in the head. However, historian Edward J. Cashin stated in a 2000 book that the raiders killed four British soldiers on the island, scalping one. Additionally, several individuals on the British side were wounded. Discussing the raid in 1883, Jones stated that the Patriots suffered no casualties. However, according to Ryan, one Creek was killed during a drunken fight with one of the raiders, constituting the only death on that side of the battle.

"the event stands as a stark dramatization of the extreme brutality necessary to maintain the slave system"

— Historian Sylvia R. Frey, discussing the raid in a 1991 book.

Due in large part to the secrecy surrounding the raid, it is unclear whether or not a massacre of runaway slaves, as had been discussed in the correspondence between Bull and Laurens, actually occurred. According to Ryan, the runaway slaves may have become aware of the planned raid and deserted into the surrounding wetland prior to the event. In a 2012 book, political commentator Kevin Phillips states that, at the time the raid happened, the runaway slaves present on the island had been transported elsewhere by British ships. However, it is known that the raiding party captured either 12 or 13 runaway slaves, one marine, and several white Loyalists.

== Aftermath ==
Commenting later on the raid, Royal Governor Patrick Tonyn of East Florida criticized the brutality demonstrated by the raiders, writing in a letter that they demonstrated "signs of the most savage barbarity" and that "the white people exceeded the ferocity of the Indians". According to historian Leslie Hall, the raid may have swayed the British towards agreeing to a prisoner exchange with the Patriots just two days later. By the end of the month, the British fleet had largely departed from the Savannah River, with only two ships left to guard Tybee Island. Also shortly after the raid, Bulloch was elevated to commander-in-chief of Georgia's armed forces, though he died a short time after taking office.

Concerning the larger trend of runaway slaves seeking refuge with British, Ryan and Sensbach have noted that the incidents pushed Patriots towards seeking independence from Great Britain. A day after the raid, the South Carolina Provincial Congress approved a new constitution for their state that mentioned the incidents, accusing Great Britain of "exciting domestic insurrections—proclaimed freedom to servants and slaves—enticed or stolen them from, and armed against their masters". Similar sentiments would be echoed in the U.S. Declaration of Independence, drafted later that year, when Thomas Jefferson included a line saying that King George III had "excited domestic insurrections amongst us". Per Sensbach, the "domestic insurrections" referenced by Jefferson would have been understood at the time as referring to slave rebellions. Sensbach goes on to say,

The desire of African Americans to be free ... had helped drive the revolutionaries to declare independence. The founding document of the United States defends the enslavement of one group of Americans to argue that another group should be free.

== Sources ==
- Butler, Nic (August 9, 2019). "The Evolution of Charleston's Name". Charleston County Public Library. Archived from the original on October 13, 2024.
- Cashin, Edward J. (2000). William Bartram and the American Revolution on the Southern Frontier. Columbia, South Carolina: University of South Carolina Press. ISBN 978-1-57003-325-4. OCLC 42882927.
- Diouf, Sylviane A. (2014). Slavery's Exiles: The Story of the American Maroons. New York City: New York University Press. ISBN 978-0-8147-6028-4. OCLC 864551110.
- Frey, Sylvia R. (1991). Water from the Rock: Black Resistance in a Revolutionary Age. Princeton, New Jersey: Princeton University Press. ISBN 978-0-691-21622-5. OCLC 1176566422.
- Hall, Leslie (2001). Land & Allegiance in Revolutionary Georgia. Athens, Georgia: University of Georgia Press. ISBN 978-0-8203-2262-9. OCLC 44172950.
- Jones, Charles C. Jr. (1883). The History of Georgia. Vol. II: Revolutionary Epoch. Boston: Houghton, Mifflin and Company. OCLC 457647597.
- Olwell, Robert (1998). Masters, Slaves, & Subjects: The Culture of Power in the South Carolina Low Country, 1740–1790. Ithaca, New York: Cornell University Press. ISBN 978-0-8014-8491-9. OCLC 38174225.
- Palmer, Aaron (2014). Jacobs, Jaap; Roper, L. H.; Van Ruymbeke, Bertrand (eds.). A Rule of Law: Elite Political Authority and the Coming of the Revolution in the South Carolina Lowcountry, 1763–1776. Early American History Series: The American Colonies, 1500–1830. Vol. 3. Leiden: Brill Publishers. doi:10.1163/9789004272354. ISBN 978-90-04-27235-4. OCLC 878108931.
- Phillips, Kevin (2012). 1775: A Good Year for Revolution. New York City: Viking Press. ISBN 978-0-670-02512-1. OCLC 772774173.
- Raphael, Ray (2001). Zinn, Howard (ed.). A People's History of the American Revolution: How Common People Shaped the Fight for Independence. New York City: The New Press. ISBN 978-1-56584-653-1.
- Raphael, Ray (2009). Founders: The People Who Brought You a Nation. New York City: The New Press. ISBN 978-1-59558-506-6. OCLC 646830511.
- Ryan, William R. (2010). The World of Thomas Jeremiah: Charles Town on the Eve of the American Revolution. Oxford: Oxford University Press. ISBN 978-0-19-975090-0. OCLC 610027148.
- Schmidt, Jim (January 23, 2019) [September 19, 2002]. "Archibald Bulloch". New Georgia Encyclopedia. Archived from the original on December 10, 2024.
- Sensbach, Jon (2008). ""Self-Evident Truths" on Trial: African Americans in the American Revolution". In Frank, Andrew K. (ed.). American Revolution: People and Perspectives. Perspectives in American Social History. Santa Barbara, California: ABC-Clio. pp. 43–64. ISBN 978-1-85109-708-1. OCLC 85833281.
- Smith, Josiah Jr. (January 1932). "Josiah Smith's Diary, 1780–1781". The South Carolina Historical and Genealogical Magazine. XXXIII (1). Annotated by Mabel L. Webber. Charleston, South Carolina: South Carolina Historical Society: 1–28.
- Wood, Peter H. (1997). ""The Facts Speak Loudly Enough": Exploring Early Southern Black History". In Clinton, Catherine; Gillespie, Michele (eds.). The Devil's Lane: Sex and Race in the Early South. Oxford: Oxford University Press. pp. 3–14. ISBN 978-0-19-511242-9. OCLC 64712071.
