= 1st Georgia General Assembly =

The Georgia General Assembly first started in 1751, but was not active until 1777, when Georgia became one of the Thirteen Colonies and broke away from Great Britain. The 2nd Georgia General Assembly followed two years later. It took place sometime in January, in Savannah, which was the capital of Georgia at the time. The capital was moved to its present location, Atlanta, in 1868. The Assembly has been held once every two years starting in 1777. The Assembly elected the Georgia House of Representatives and Georgia Senate.

== Overview ==
=== House of Representatives ===
The House of Representatives is the larger of the two chambers. Its 180 members represent districts from across the state, and it is presided over by the Speaker of the House, who is elected by the entire membership.

==== Speaker of the House ====
The Speaker has always been a member of the majority political party and has the power to schedule debates, to vote, and to assign members to committees.

=== Senators ===
The state senate is very similar to the house, but the senate is a smaller body, with fifty-six members who represent districts from around the state.

==== Lieutenant governor ====
The chief officer of the senate is the lieutenant governor. Unlike the Speaker, who is elected by the members of the house, the lieutenant governor is elected by all the voters of the state. The first Lieutenant Governor was Melvin E. Thompson, elected in 1947. Before that, the position never existed in Georgia.

===== Governor =====
Archibald Bulloch, elected on April 15, 1776, was the first official governor of Georgia. Technically, William Ewen, George Walton, and William Ewen were governor before, but Bulloch was the first after the signing of the United States Declaration of Independence. His term ended on March 4, 1777.

====== Terms ======
At that time terms were uncertain and the governors picked how long their terms would be. It was not until May 1777 when the people finally decided to make governor terms one year. This was because the people were afraid of too much government control based on past governors' loyalty to Great Britain, and gave the legislature the most power, severely limiting the governor's power and time. Also at this time the governors could only have one term, they could not go for reelection. In 1789 it was changed to two-year terms. Eventually the terms became four years and that stuck, because now every Governor and President have four-year terms.

====== Consecutive terms ======
Consecutive terms were not allowed for 10 years. In 1789 terms were one year. Before 1789 term lengths were picked by the governor, mostly they were two or three months long. Terms after 1789 were one year long but were not classified as "terms". The first actual term was in 1857 when Joseph E. Brown served 3 1/2 terms from November 6, 1857, to June 17, 1865. That was the first consecutive term, but consecutive terms were allowed since 1789. From 1941 to 1977 consecutive terms were not allowed; after 1977 consecutive terms were again allowed.

== See also ==
- List of Georgia state legislatures
