= Bulloch–Habersham House =

Historic house in Savannah, Georgia

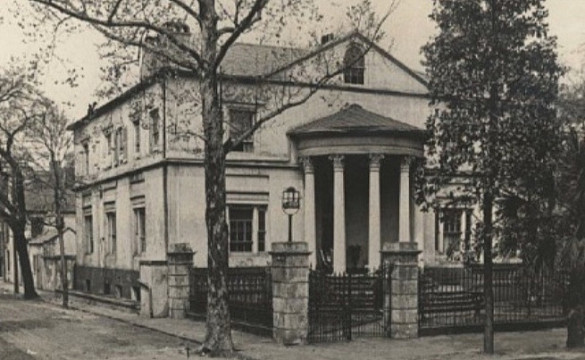
- The building viewed from West Perry Street
- Interactive map of the Bulloch–Habersham House area
- Former names: Archibald Bulloch House

General information
- Location: Savannah, Georgia, U.S., Barnard Street
- Coordinates: 32.0761°N 81.0960°W
- Completed: 1820
- Demolished: 1916 (110 years ago)

Technical details
- Floor count: 2

Design and construction
- Architect: William Jay

The Bulloch–Habersham House (originally the Archibald Bulloch House) was a mansion in Savannah, Georgia, United States. Completed in 1820, to a design by noted architect William Jay, it stood at the corner of Barnard Street and West Perry Street, in the southwestern trust lot of Orleans Square, until its demolition in 1916. It was replaced by what is now Savannah Civic Center. Historian John D. Duncan described the building's demise as "one of the worst cases of metropolitan malfeasance to be documented in an era when the preservation movement was just beginning to gain attention."

In 1819, during the building's construction, Jay was fined $30 for obstructing Barnard Street.

Originally the home of Archibald Stobo Bulloch Jr. (whose father was Georgia's first non-royal head of state), the home contained several pieces of furniture by New York City cabinetmaker Charles-Honoré Lannuier. Savannah's great fire of 1820 decimated Bulloch's fortune, and he was forced to sell his family's home to John Morel and David Leion. Morel and Leion converted the mansion into a boarding house. In 1834, it was purchased by Robert Habersham, a Savannah merchant and planter. After Habersham's death in 1870, it passed to his son, William Neyle Habersham. The home was maintained by Habersham's heirs until 1905, six years after William's death. In 1915, it was purchased by the City of Savannah, shortly after which it was demolished.

The house had a broad central hall with two 20-foot wide rooms on each side, a circular domed drawing room, a spiral staircase cantilevered within a circle of six Corinthian columns, unusual tripartite windows on the main floor, and a double drawing room with Corinthian and Ionic column screens. A figural mantel in the style of Richard Westmacott Jr., graced the north-east drawing room, and carved Egyptian masks were part of the decorative vocabulary.

— Page Talbott, Classical Savannah

Habersham Memorial Hall, in Atlanta, Georgia, was designed to replicate the home. It was completed in 1923.
