= Andrew Frank =

Andrew Frank may refer to:

- Andrew A. Frank, American professor of mechanical and aeronautical engineering
- Andrew K. Frank (born 1970), American professor of history
- Andrew U. Frank (born 1948), Swiss-Austrian professor for geoinformation
