= Walter Charlton Hartridge Jr. =

American scholar

- Born: February 9, 1914; Savannah, Georgia, U.S.
- Died: August 19, 1974 (aged 60); Savannah, Georgia, U.S.
- Occupations: Historian, preservationist

Walter Charlton Hartridge Jr. (February 9, 1914 – August 19, 1974) was an American scholar, preservationist and author. He was president of the Georgia Historical Society between 1952 and 1961, established Savannah Restorations, a preservation company, and was involved in the preservation of several buildings in his hometown of Savannah, Georgia, including the Olde Pink House, the William Scarborough House and the Isaiah Davenport House.

== Early life ==
Hartridge was born in 1914 in Savannah, Georgia, to Captain Walter Charlton Hartridge Sr. and his second wife, Catharine Honoria McIntire. He attended Pape School in Savannah, then Loomis Chaffee School in Windsor, Connecticut. He received a B.A. in History, cum laude, from Harvard University in 1936. Two years later, he received a master's degree in Architectural History from Harvard.

== Career ==
Hartridge wrote several genealogical articles in journals of historical note, as well as the text to accompany Christopher Murray's 1947 publication Savannah: Etchings and Drawings.

In 1952, Hartridge became president of the Georgia Historical Society, a role in which he remained for nine years.

== Personal life ==
In 1956, Hartridge married Susan L'Engle McMillan, a Floridian who became an emeritus member of the Trustees' Garden Club during her life in Savannah. They had one child: Walter Charlton Hartridge III. The family lived in the John Ash House in Savannah's Orleans Square.

His grandfather was U.S. Representative Julian Hartridge, and his great-grandfather was judge and U.S. District Attorney Robert Milledge Charlton.

Hartridge was a member of the parish council of the Cathedral of St. John the Baptist and a member of The Oglethorpe Club.

In 1964, he was awarded the Gignilliat Award from the City of Savannah for his contributions to the city's culture, notably his work with Historic Savannah Foundation and the Savannah Symphony.

A descendant of the Fatio family, Hartridge studied the history of St. Augustine, Florida. He was a regular visitor to Savannah's Wormsloe Historic Site, having worked extensively with author Elfrida De Renne Barrow, a descendant of English colonist and Wormsloe's founder Noble Jones.

== Death ==
Hartridge died in 1974, aged 60. He was interred in Savannah's Laurel Grove Cemetery North. His wife survived him by 41 years, and was interred beside him upon her death.

=== Legacy ===
The Walter C. Hartridge Jr. Collection, at the Georgia Historical Society, contains several of his articles and speeches.
