= John Ash House (Savannah, Georgia) =

Historic house in Savannah, Georgia

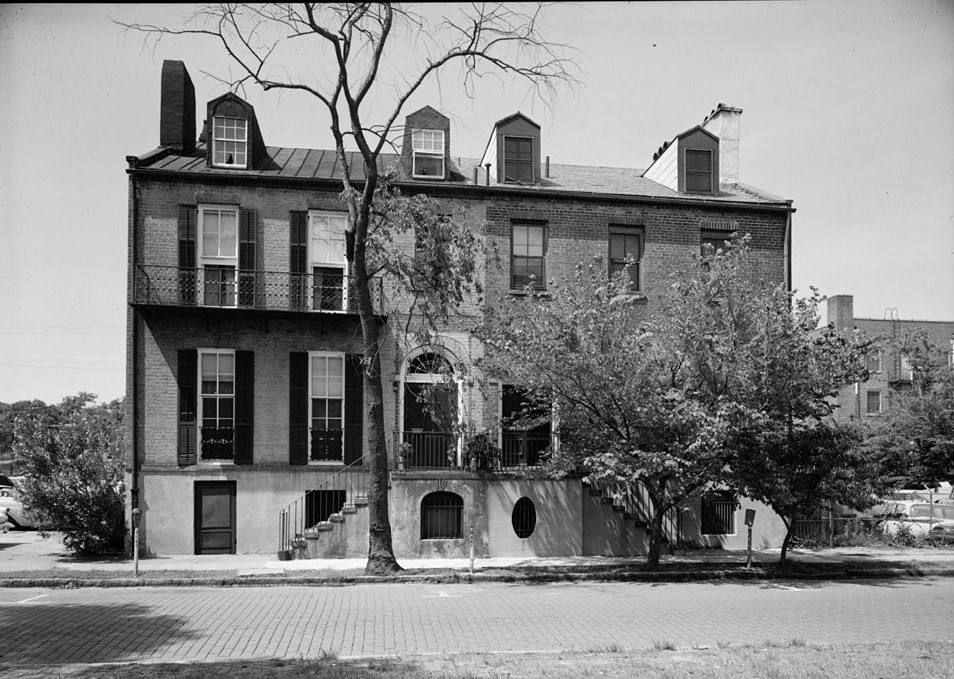
- The building in the first half of the 20th century, photographed by Frances Benjamin Johnston for the Historic American Buildings Survey
- Interactive map of the John Ash House area

General information
- Location: Savannah, Georgia, U.S., 114–116 West Hull Street
- Coordinates: 32.0766386°N 81.094648°W
- Completed: 1817 (209 years ago)

Technical details
- Floor count: 3

The John Ash House is a building in Savannah, Georgia, United States. Standing at 114–116 West Hull Street, it is located in the northeastern residential block of Orleans Square and was built in 1817. Built as a home for John Ash, it is now part of the Savannah Historic District and is the oldest building in Orleans Square.

In a survey for Historic Savannah Foundation, Mary Lane Morrison found the building to be of significant status and rated as "exceptional." It was documented by the Historical American Building Survey in the mid-20th century, when its significance was noted due to being a "good example of Federal, Adamesque style."

Walter Charlton Hartridge lived here in the 19th century.

== See also ==
- Buildings in Savannah Historic District
