= 130th Georgia General Assembly =

128th Georgia General Assembly
←	129th	131st	→
- Great Seal of the State of Georgia

Overview
- Legislative body: Georgia General Assembly
- Meeting place: Capitol Building - Atlanta

Senate
- Members: 54
- President of the Senate: George T. Smith
- Party control: Democratic Party

House of Representatives
- Members: 195
- Speaker of the House: George L. Smith
- Party control: Democratic Party

Sessions
- 1st: January 24, 1969 – January 13, 1969
- 2nd: February 21, 1970 – January 12, 1970

Special sessions
- 1st: February 10, 1969 – March 21, 1969
- 2nd: June 12, 1969 – June 13, 1969

The 130th Georgia General Assembly began in January 1969 and ended in January 1971. For the 1968 state elections, the size of the House was decreased from 205 to 195, removing ten seats. It would remain at this number until the 1972 election for the House, in which the seats were reduced to 179. The number would be raised again in 1976 to 182 and then lowered to its current number of 180 in 1978.
