= Orleans Square =

Public square in Savannah, Georgia

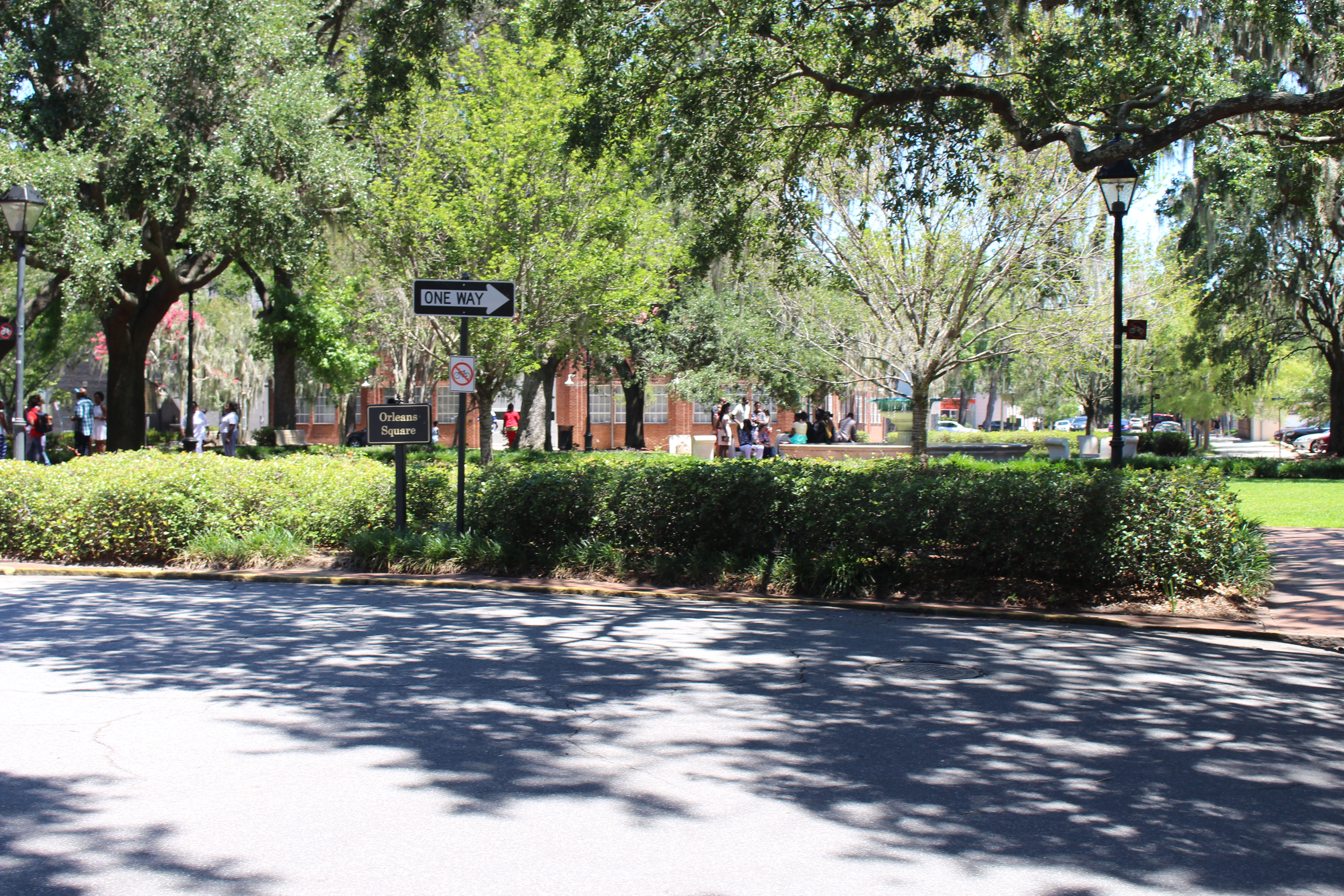
- The square in 2017, looking northwest
- Interactive map of Orleans Square
- Namesake: Battle of New Orleans
- Maintained by: City of Savannah
- Location: Savannah, Georgia, U.S.
- Coordinates: 32.0763°N 81.0954°W
- North: Barnard Street
- East: West McDonough Street
- South: Barnard Street
- West: West McDonough Street

Construction
- Completion: 1815 (211 years ago)

Orleans Square is one of the 22 squares of Savannah, Georgia, United States. It is located in the middle row of the city's five rows of squares, on Barnard Street and West McDonough Street, and was laid out in 1815, shortly after the event it commemorates: General Andrew Jackson's victory at the Battle of New Orleans that January. It is south of Telfair Square, west of Chippewa Square and north of Pulaski Square. The oldest building on the square is the John Ash House, at 114–116 West Hull Street, which dates to 1817.

In the center of the square, the German Memorial Fountain honors early German immigrants to Savannah. Installed in 1989, it commemorates the 250th anniversary of Georgia and of Savannah, as well as the 300th anniversary of the arrival in Philadelphia of thirteen Rhenish families.

Between 1820 and 1916, the Bulloch–Habersham House stood in the square. It was designed by William Jay. Its demolition was described by historian John D. Duncan as "one of the worst cases of metropolitan malfeasance to be documented in an era when the preservation movement was just beginning to gain attention."

== Dedication ==
Namesake	Image	Note
Battle of New Orleans		The square is named for the Battle of New Orleans, 1815, in which the United States Army were victorious.

== Markers and structures ==
Object	Image	Note
German Memorial Fountain		German Memorial Fountain in the square, completed in 1989.
German Memorial Fountain marker		German Memorial Fountain marker, erected and dedicated by the descendants of Savannah's early German settlers.

== Constituent buildings ==
Each building below is in one of the eight blocks around the square composed of four residential "tything" blocks and four civic ("trust") blocks, now known as the Oglethorpe Plan. They are listed with construction years where known.

Northwestern residential/tything block

- Oglethorpe House, 201 West Oglethorpe Avenue (1964) – formerly the Downtowner Motor Inn

Southwestern residential/tything block

- Frederick Tebeau House, 101 West Perry Street (1836) – remodeled in 1876; moved from 16 West Liberty Street in the 1980s
- John Martin/A.J. Miller Duplex, 105–107 West Perry Street (1872) – by DeWitt Bruyn
- Laura Mehrtens House, 109 West Perry Street (1904)
- Mordecai Myers House, 111 West Perry Street (1833) – third floor added c. 1880
- Henry Hayme Duplex, 113–115 West Perry Street (1887) – by Calvin Fay and Alfred Eichberg
- John Morel Property, 117–119 West Perry Street (1818) – remodeled in 1875

Northeastern residential/tything block

- John Ash House, 114–116 West Hull Street (1817) – oldest building on the square

Southeastern civic/trust block

- Harper Fowlkes House, 230 Barnard Street (1844)

== Gallery ==
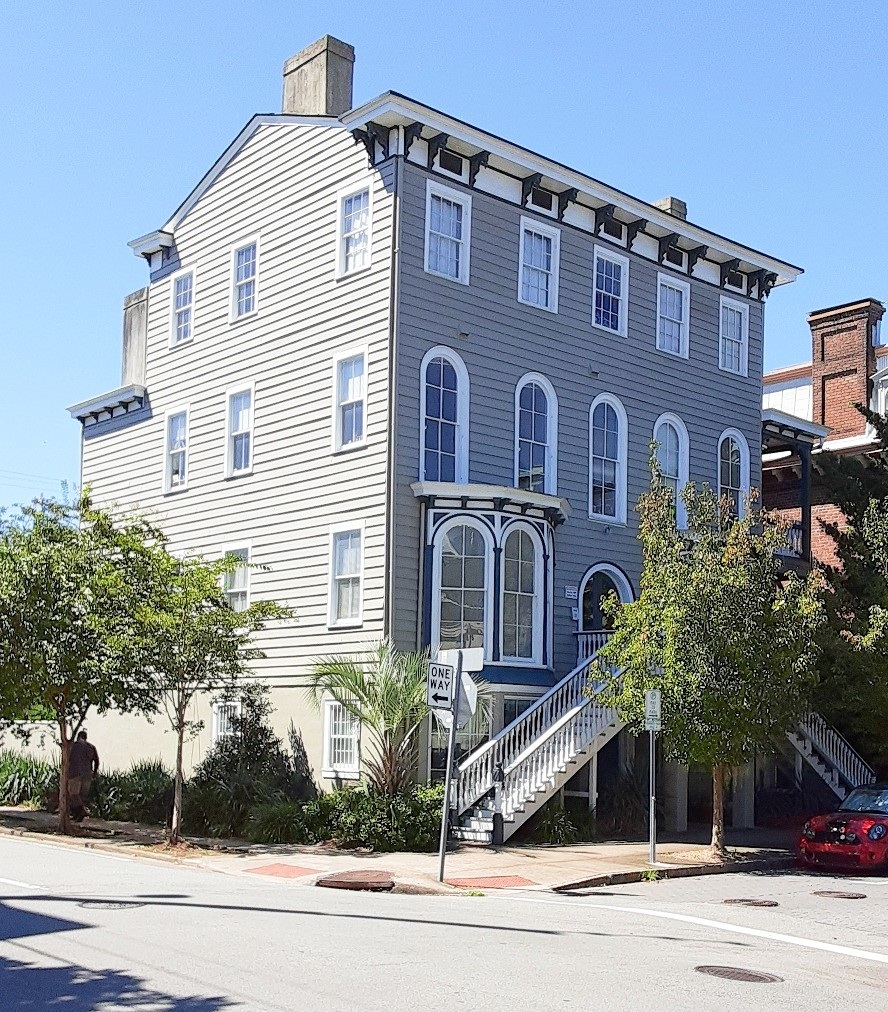
Frederick Tebeau House, 101 West Perry Street

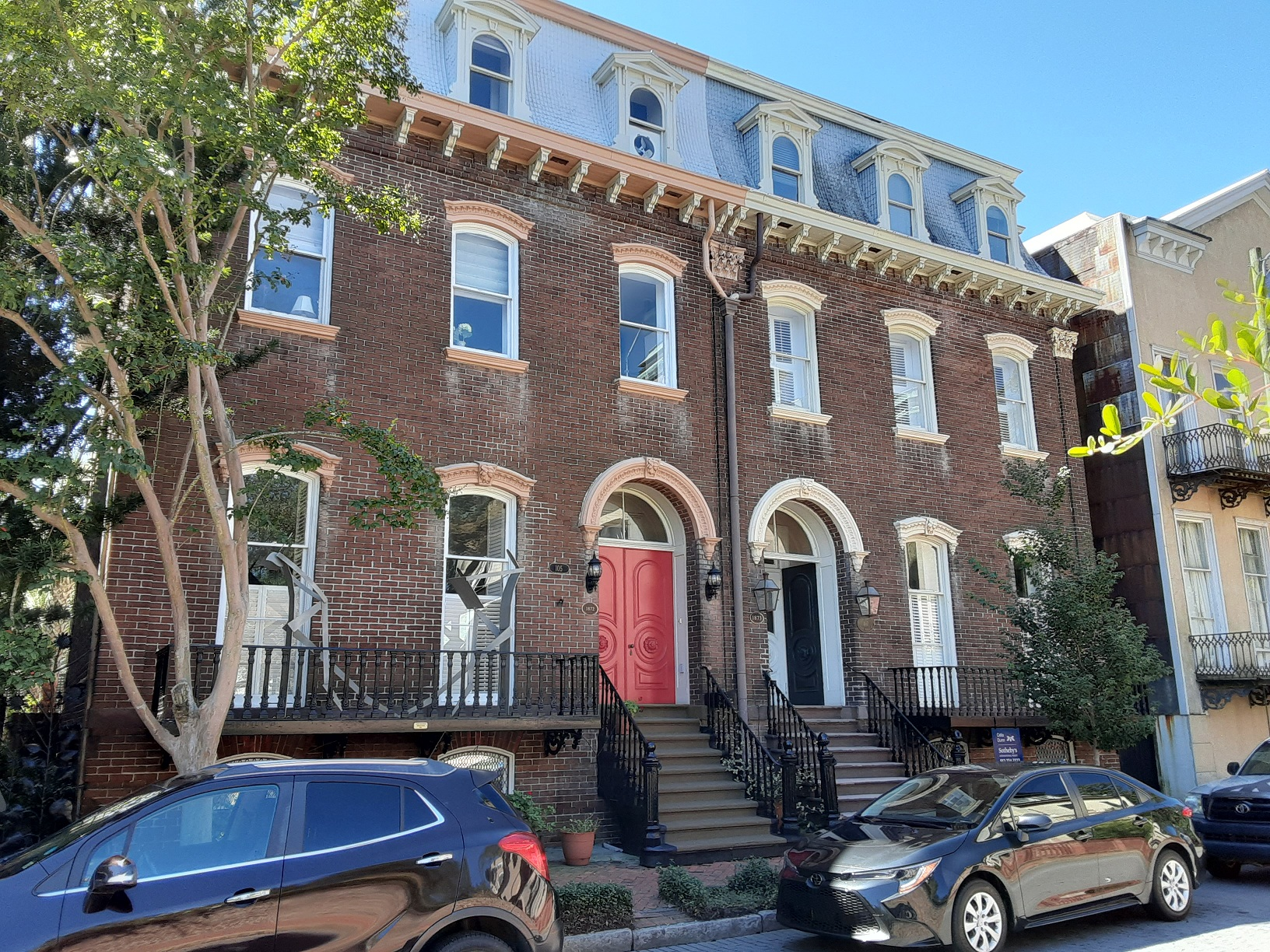
John Martin/A.J. Miller Duplex, 105–107 West Perry Street

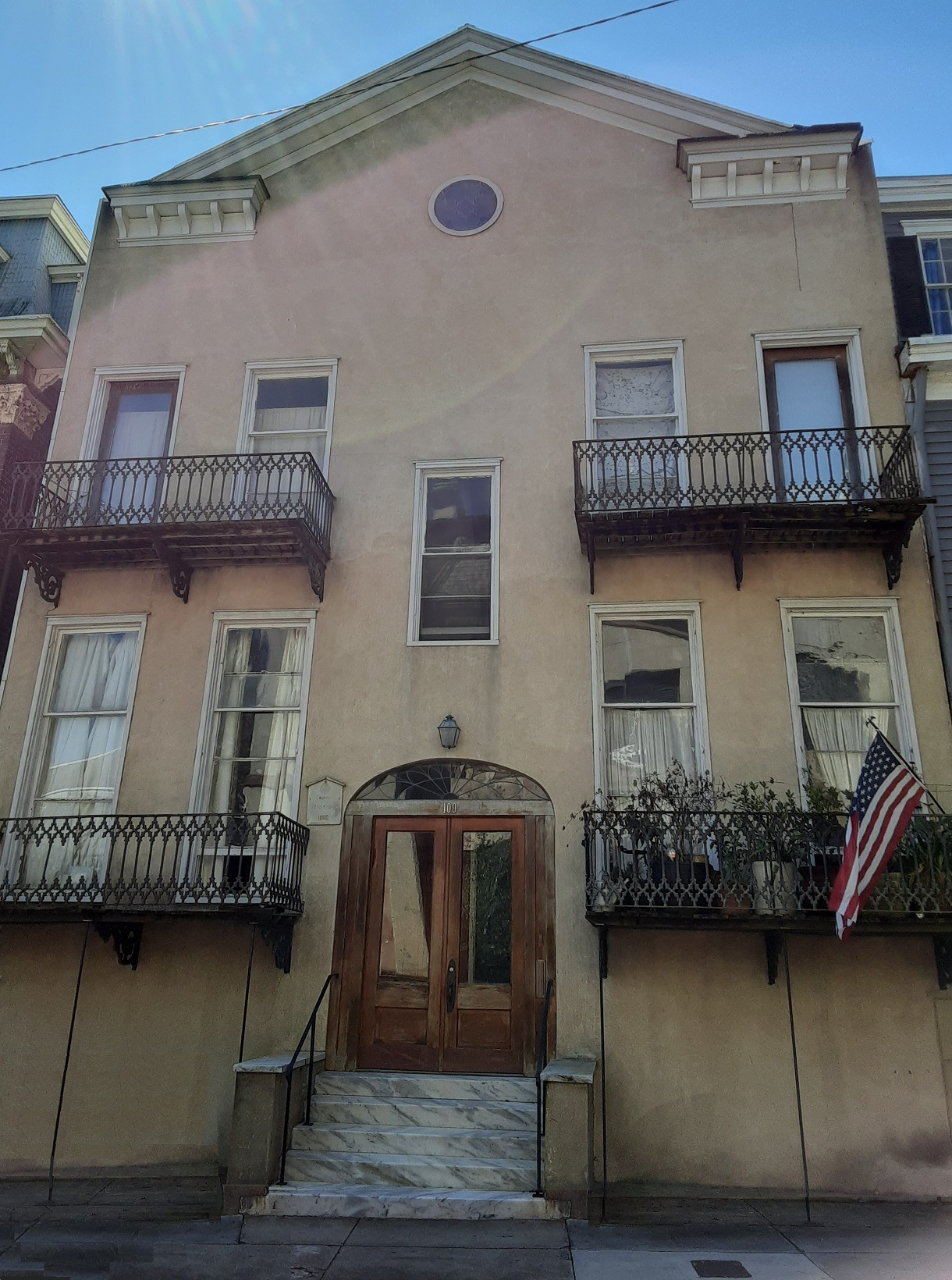
Laura Mehrtens House, 109 West Perry Street

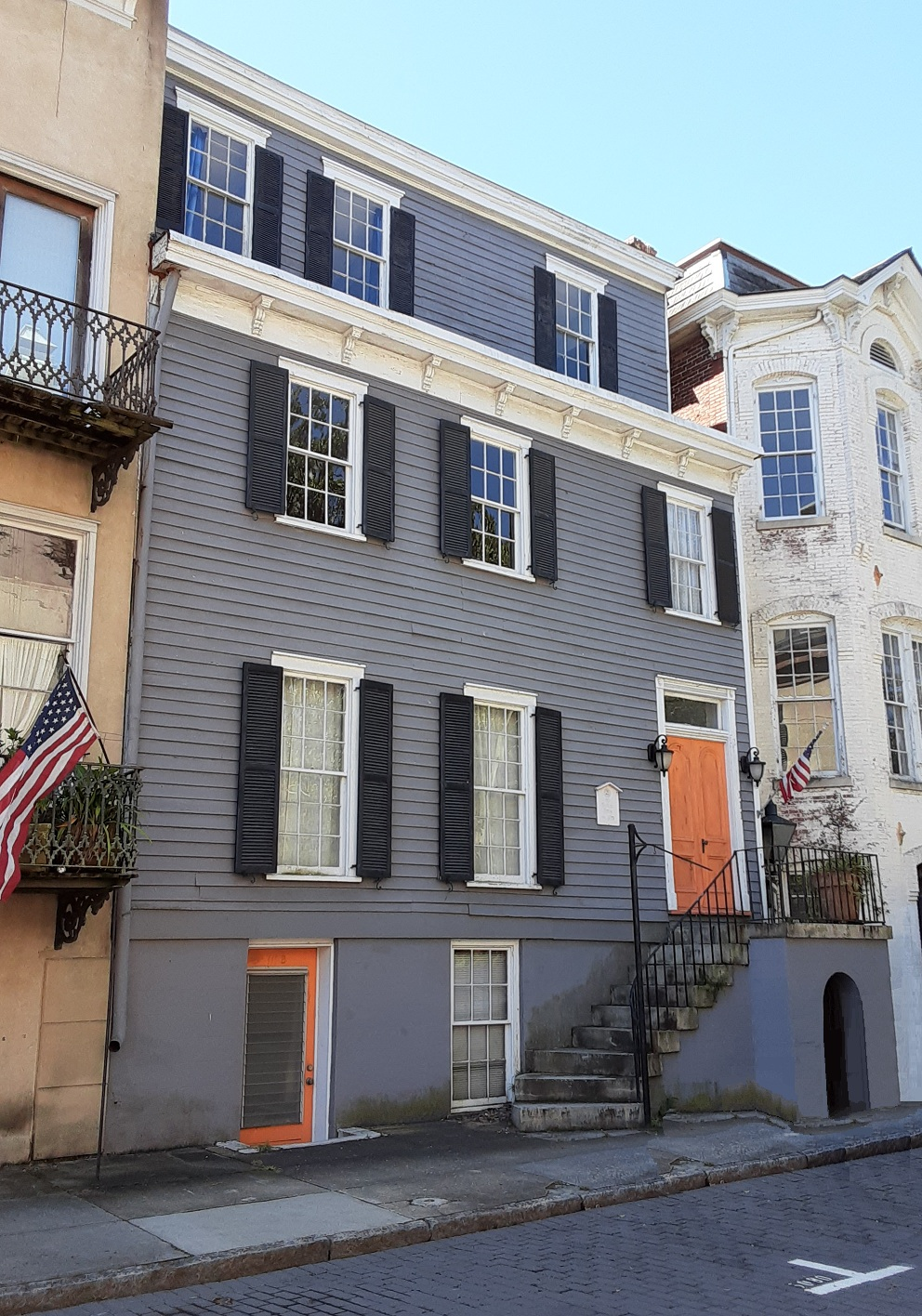
Mordecai Myers House, 111 West Perry Street

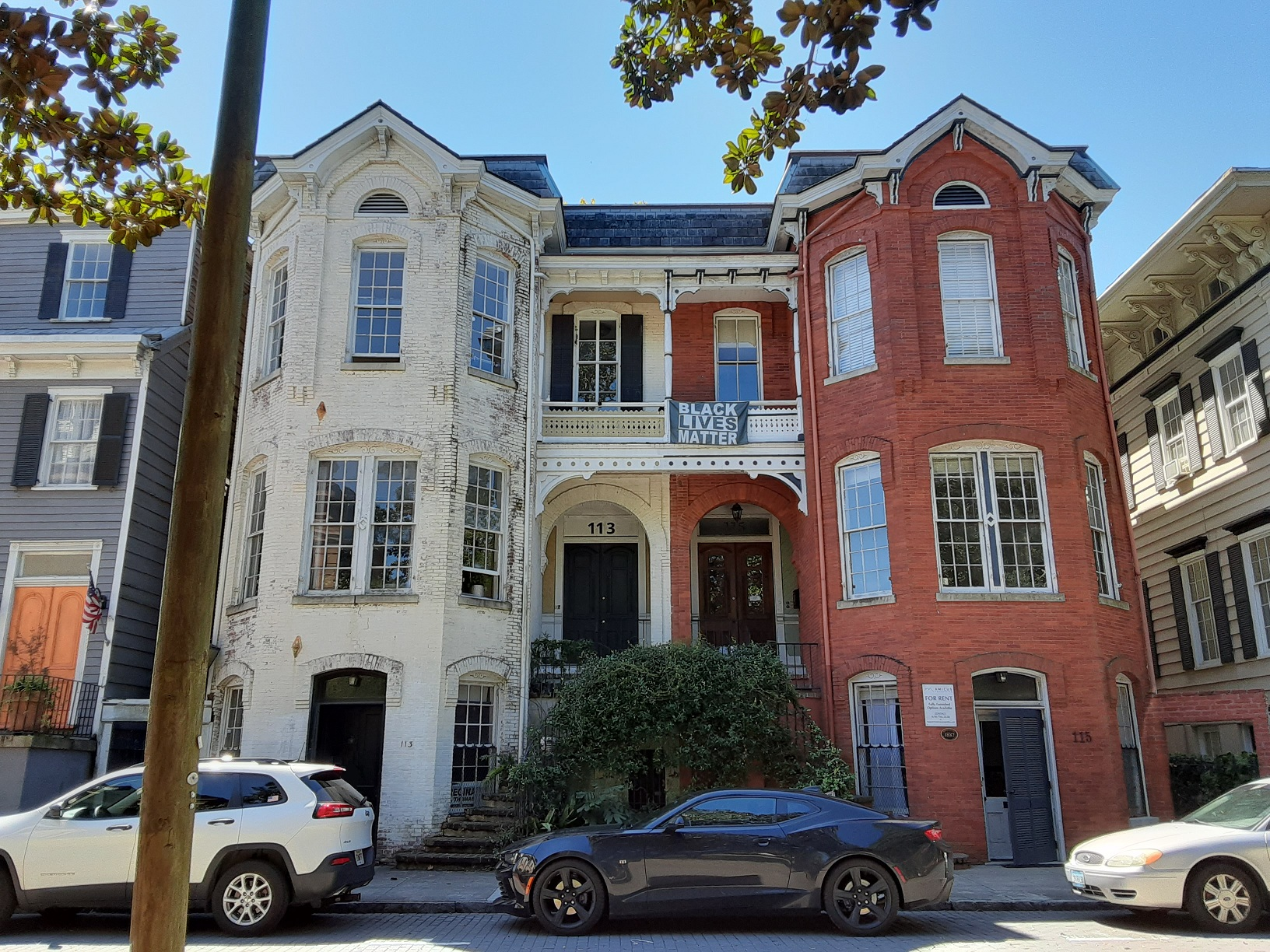
Henry Hayme Duplex, 113–115 West Perry Street

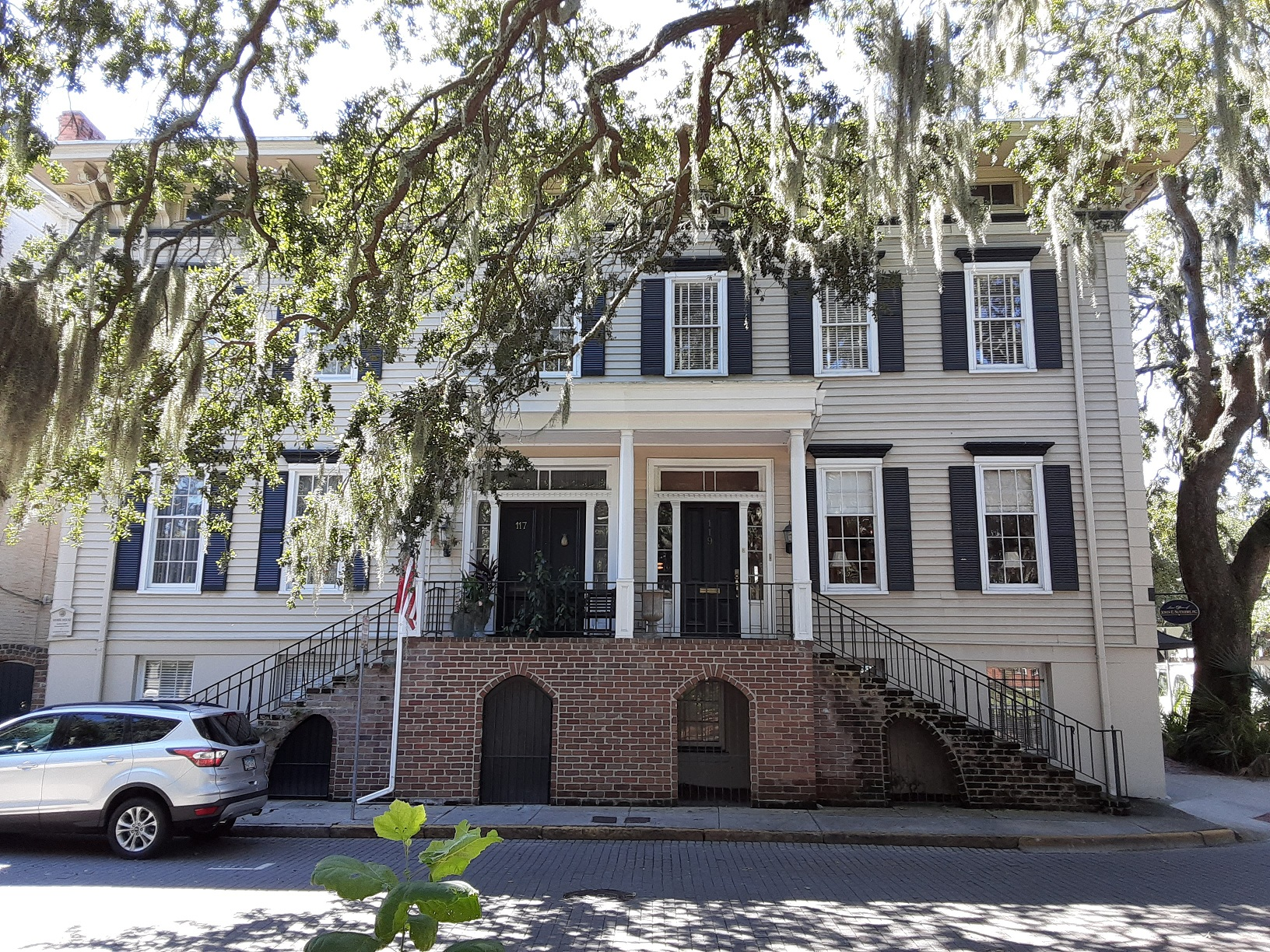
John Morel Property, 117-119 West Perry Street

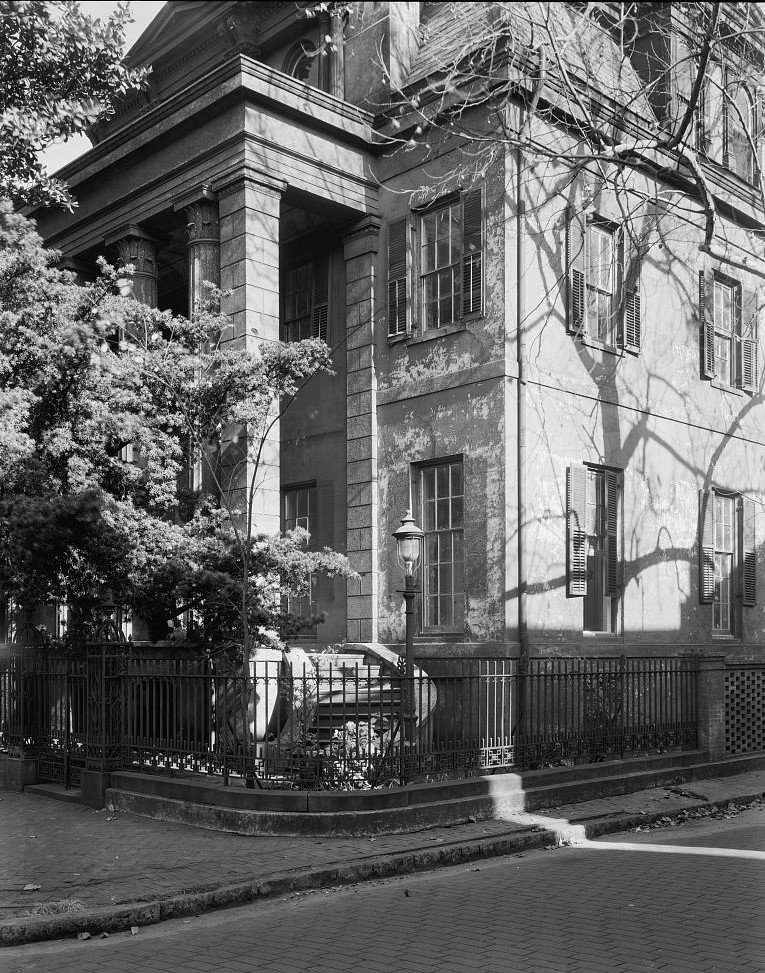
The Harper Fowlkes House, 230 Barnard Street

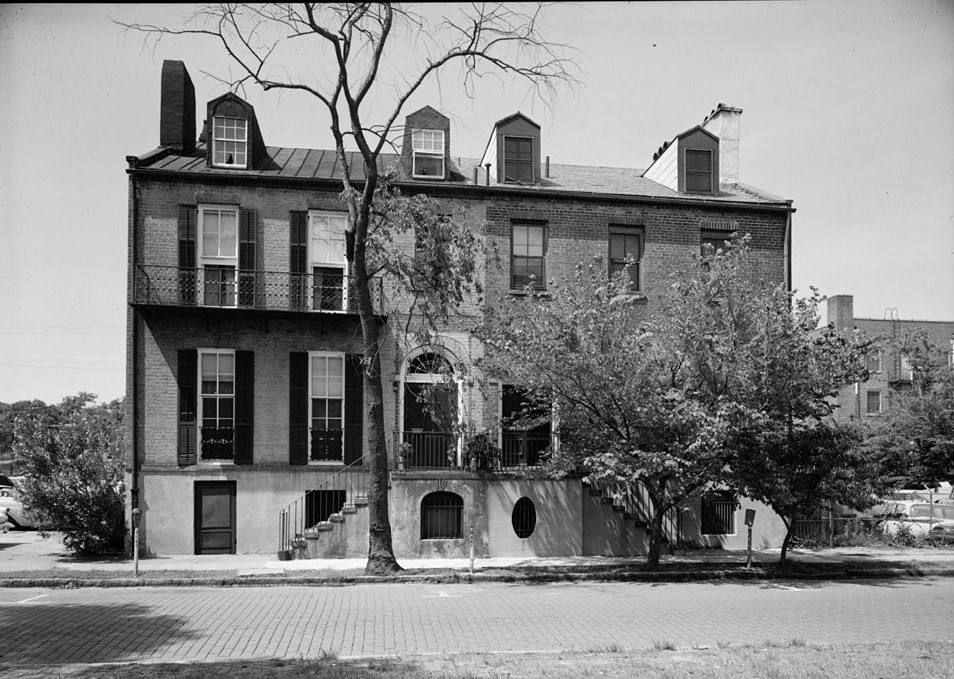
John Ash House, 114–116 West Hull Street

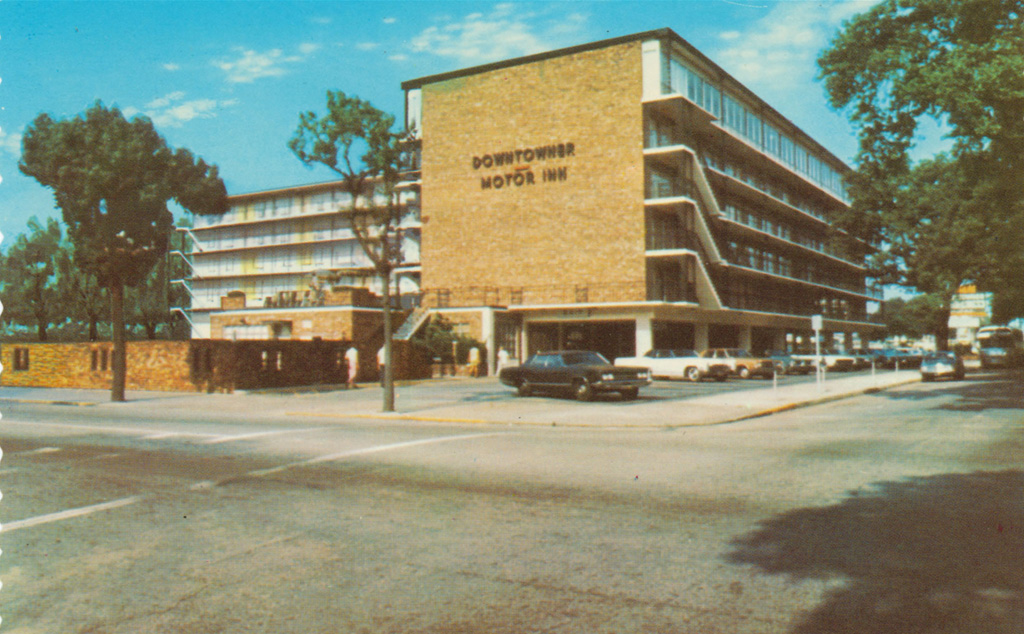
The former Downtowner Motor Inn, 201 West Oglethorpe Avenue, now home to SCAD's Oglethorpe House
