= Cornelius Winter =

American Methodist preacher

Cornelius Winter (1742–1808) was an American Methodist preacher, an understudy of and assistant to George Whitefield, with whom he went to the American colony of Georgia as a catechist to Negro slaves, an educator who established two Dissenting academies for training Dissenting clergy, and "a very influential pastor".

== Childhood ==
Winter was born in Gray's Inn Lane, in the parish of St. Andrew, Holborn, on 9 October 1742. He was the ninth and last child of John and Catherine Winter. He was baptized on 16 October 1742 in the parish church.

Winter's father was born "in, or near, Nottingham" and was a Dissenter. His father's occupation was a shoe-maker. In the latter part of his life, he became head porter of Gray's Inn, a job that paid sixty pounds per annum. This would be worth £7, 763.00. in 2014 purchasing power. His father died of consumption when Cornelius was nine months old.

Winter's mother was born in Guildford in Surrey. She was the second wife of Winter's father. She died of consumption in 1750. Cornelius with a brother and a sister were only survivors of the nine children.

After the death of his mother, Winter spent his "time in idleness and childish dissipation" until at eight years he was admitted into the charity school of St. Andrew's, Holborn, Holborn.

== Education ==
Winter's formal education was less than two years in the charity school of St. Andrew's.

Winter's mother was unable to earn enough by her work as a cleaner and laundress in Gray's Inn to support them, so Winter had to go the workhouse. He remained there until a relative took him away as an apprentice. The relative was a Water-gilder. A water gilder "gilded metal surfaces by applying liquid amalgam, the mercury being afterwards removed by evaporation". Winter worked in his relatives work-shop and performed domestic services fourteen hours a day until he was twenty-one years old.

While an apprentice to his relative, Winter was no longer in school. All told, he had been in the school less than two years. He learned to write, but had learned none of the multiplication tables. In spite of his fourteen hours a day working for his relative, Winter worked on his writing skill in combination with his study of the Bible. He once copied a chapter from the Bible as a way of accomplishing both ends. As he wrote, Winter educated himself by studying Hebrew, Latin, and Greek grammar and by "reading good authors".

Although Winter was almost "entirely self-educated", by his diligent study he "gathered remarkable learning". He bequeathed 850 books from his academy at Painswick, Gloucestershire to the academy of nonconformist leader David Bogue.

== Converted by Whitefield's preaching ==
During his apprenticeship with his relative, Winter heard George Whitefield preach. On the 9 April 1760, a sermon by Whitefield convicted Winter of his sin and changed his life. So it was that Winter became Whitefield's convert.

An assistant to Whitefield held meetings of converts at which they could speak. Winter spoke at one meeting and what he said was "kindly received". After that he spoke at every opportunity. A Dissenting preacher offered Winter an opportunity to preach occasionally at Cheshunt, in Hertfordshire. Thus, Winter became an itinerant preacher who preached as opportunities presented themselves.

=== Whitefield's assistant ===
John Berridge commended Winter to Whitefield who kept Winter as his "secretary and ministerial understudy".

In 1769, Winter accompanied Whitefield to America to be a catechist to Negro slaves in Georgia. The party arrived at Savannah on 14 December 1769. The next Sunday, Winter introduced worship to some Negroes. However, most of the congregation were asleep or playing with their fingers, or talking with each other.

On the death of Whitefield 1770, the trustees of the Bethesda Orphanage sent Winter to receive ordination from the Bishop of London. Winter carried many recommendations from leaders in Georgia, but Episcopal ordination was denied him.

== Itinerant preaching ==
Without Episcopal ordination, Winter's return to America was precluded. Therefore, he resumed his itinerant preaching in England, as he had done before going to America. He preached wherever he could find a congregation.

With the support of Rowland Hill, Winter did itinerant preaching in Wiltshire and Gloucestershire. His home was a small house at Christian Malford where he lived a "semi-monastic" until the age of thirty-five in 1777. On 2 October 1777, Winter was ordained as a Dissenting minister.

Shortly after Winter was ordained, the Reverend Robert Sloper of Devizes referred Winter to the Dissenting congregation in Marlborough, Wiltshire. There, Winter met the people, preached sermons, and was accepted as their pastor, officially beginning 2 February 1778.

== Marlborough, Wiltshire, 1778–1788 ==
After eight years of itinerant preaching, Winter settled in Marlborough, Wiltshire for the next decade.

In 1779, Winter married Miss Brown, who with a sister occupied a farm in the neighbourhood. The couple had no children.

Winter increased the meager income from his congregation by establishing an Academy in 1783 and charging tuition. One of his pupils was William Jay. At most the Academy had twelve students Winter's Academy in Marlborough, in operation 1783-1788, was one of England's Dissenting academies for training Dissenting clergy. Cambridge and Oxford were closed to Dissenters by the Act of Uniformity of 1662.

Winter used an "informal manner" of teaching. Lectures were replaced by "reading and a tutorial or seminar". The Academy had a balance between "practical and theoretical elements of training". As part of the practical training, Winter had his students preach in area churches very early in their course.

After a decade at Marlborough, chronic illness forced Winter to close his Academy and lose that income. Furthermore, his major benefactor was in "declining health" and his sons were hostile toward Winter. Thus, when a congregation at Painswick in Gloucestershire requested his services, he accepted.

== Painswick, Gloucestershire, 1788–1808 ==
The congregation of Christ Church nonconformist chapel at Painswick already knew Winter and his preaching. He and his wife moved there on 2 August 1788. During his tenure in Painswick, Winter rebuilt the chapel in 1803 and established a Sunday school. He also bequeathed two cottages to the congregation that were later used as the site of a school"

In 1910, a story about the closing of Christ Church in the Painswich newspaper spoke of Winter as a "very influential pastor at Christ Church".

As he had done at Marlborough, Winter established an Academy at Painswick, which operated from 1788 until his death.

== Death ==
Sunday, 13 December 1807, was the last time Winter preached. On the following Friday evening, lying in bed, Winter "stretched himself out, laid his arms at length upon his body, and indistinctly said,"Come Lord Jesus;" and died.

Winter's interment was January 19. Some thirty ministers of various denominations attended. His remains were placed in the vault beneath the pulpit. People of different religious beliefs opened their homes to those "who came from a distance". The rector of the parish apologised for not attending, as he put it, "the funeral of the ‘ever to be lamented' Mr. Winter".

== Assessments ==
Rowland Hill expressed his opinion of Winter, by affirming that "he would make the very worst devil of any man on earth".

William Jay deemed John Newton and Cornelius Winter the two "most perfect instance[s] of the spirit and temper of Christianity that I ever knew".

In 1815, Charles Buck wrote the following about Winter.

The Rev. Cornelius Winter, of Painswick, died January 10, 1808. He was a man of the most unblemished reputation,
exemplary piety, benevolence and tenderness. To him religion was not a vain thing. He found it his greatest support
under all his afflictions. When a medical man attended him, and saw how resigned he was under a fracture, he said,
"I always thought before, that religion was only something to talk about; but now (though unfortunately I have no
religion myself) I see it is a fact."
