= Page Talbott =

American author and historian

- Born: 1951 (age 74–75)
- Occupations: Author, historian
- Website: www.pagetalbott.com

Page Talbott (born 1951) is an American author and decorative arts historian. She has authored several books, and is currently the director of museum outreach at Drexel University and principal of Talbott Exhibits & Planning.

== Early life ==
Talbott studied at Wellesley College, graduating in 1972, and the University of Delaware, and gained her master's degree and doctorate from the University of Pennsylvania. The subject of her dissertation was the Philadelphia Furniture Industry 1850–1880.

== Career ==
Talbott was president of the Historical Society of Pennsylvania between 2013 and 2016, replacing Kim Sajet. She also served as consulting curator for Moore College of Art and Design for fifteen years.

== Personal life ==
Talbott is married to James E. Gould, with whom she has four children.

In 2015, Governor of Pennsylvania Tom Wolf named Talbott a Distinguished Daughter of Pennsylvania.

== Selected bibliography ==
- The Office in the 19th Century
- Classical Savannah: Fine and Decorative Arts, 1800–1840 (1995) ISBN 9780820317939
- The Philadelphia Ten: A Women's Artist Group 1917–1945 (1998) ISBN 9781584420002
- Benjamin Franklin: In Search of a Better World (2005) ISBN 9780300107999
