= John Duncan (historian) =

American author and historian (1938–2022)

- Born: 1938; South Carolina, U.S.
- Died: September 21, 2022 (aged 84); Savannah, Georgia, U.S.
- Occupations: Author, historian
- Spouse: Virginia Duncan (m. 1976)

John D. Duncan (1938 – September 21, 2022) was an American author and historian. A retired history professor, and a twelfth-generation native of South Carolina, he lived the majority of his life in Savannah, Georgia. Between 1977 and 2022, he and his wife, Virginia, owned the Thomas–Levy House in Savannah's Monterey Square. In 1983, they established V & J Duncan Antique Maps, Prints and Books in the building's basement level, and it is still in operation today.

== Life and career ==
John Duncan was born in 1938 in South Carolina.

Duncan, who was 6 feet 7 inches (2.01 m) tall, married diminutive Virginia (Ginger; born c. 1947) in 1976. They have a King Charles Spaniel named Emma. One of their previous dogs, a Cavalier King Charles Spaniel named Rosie, made an appearance in Clint Eastwood's 1997 movie Midnight in the Garden of Good and Evil, as did Duncan, who was interviewed by John Cusack's character John Kelso. John Berendt, the author of the book on which the film was based, visited the Duncans in the early 1980s, during the early research for his non-fiction novel. Ginger is mentioned in the book. Berendt has stayed with the couple several times over the years.

Beginning in 1965, when he moved to Savannah, Duncan was a history professor at Georgia Southern University–Armstrong Campus in Savannah. He retired in 1997.

In 1972, Duncan completed a PhD in history at Emory University in Atlanta. His dissertation was a two-volume history of Slavery and Servitude in Colonial South Carolina.

In 2019, he co-authored The Showy Town of Savannah, The Story of Architect William Jay, which was fifty years in the making and was extensively researched at the British Museum in London. He was writing another book, tentatively named The Museum Next Door, the same year. It is about the Thomas-Levy House, their 12 East Taylor Street home, which they purchased for $36,000; a 2002 estimate valued it close to $1 million. Savannah photographer Richard Leo Johnson took hundreds of images of the building's interior for the project.

In 2021, the Georgia Historical Society honored Duncan with the John Macpherson Berrien Lifetime Achievement Award for the previous year. Berrien was one of the founders of the Society.

=== Selected bibliography ===
- The Showy Town of Savannah, The Story of Architect William Jay (co-authored with Sandra L. Underwood), Mercer University Press (2019) ISBN 0881466891

== Death ==
Duncan died in 2022, after illness. He was 84.
