= Habersham Memorial Hall =

- U.S. National Register of Historic Places
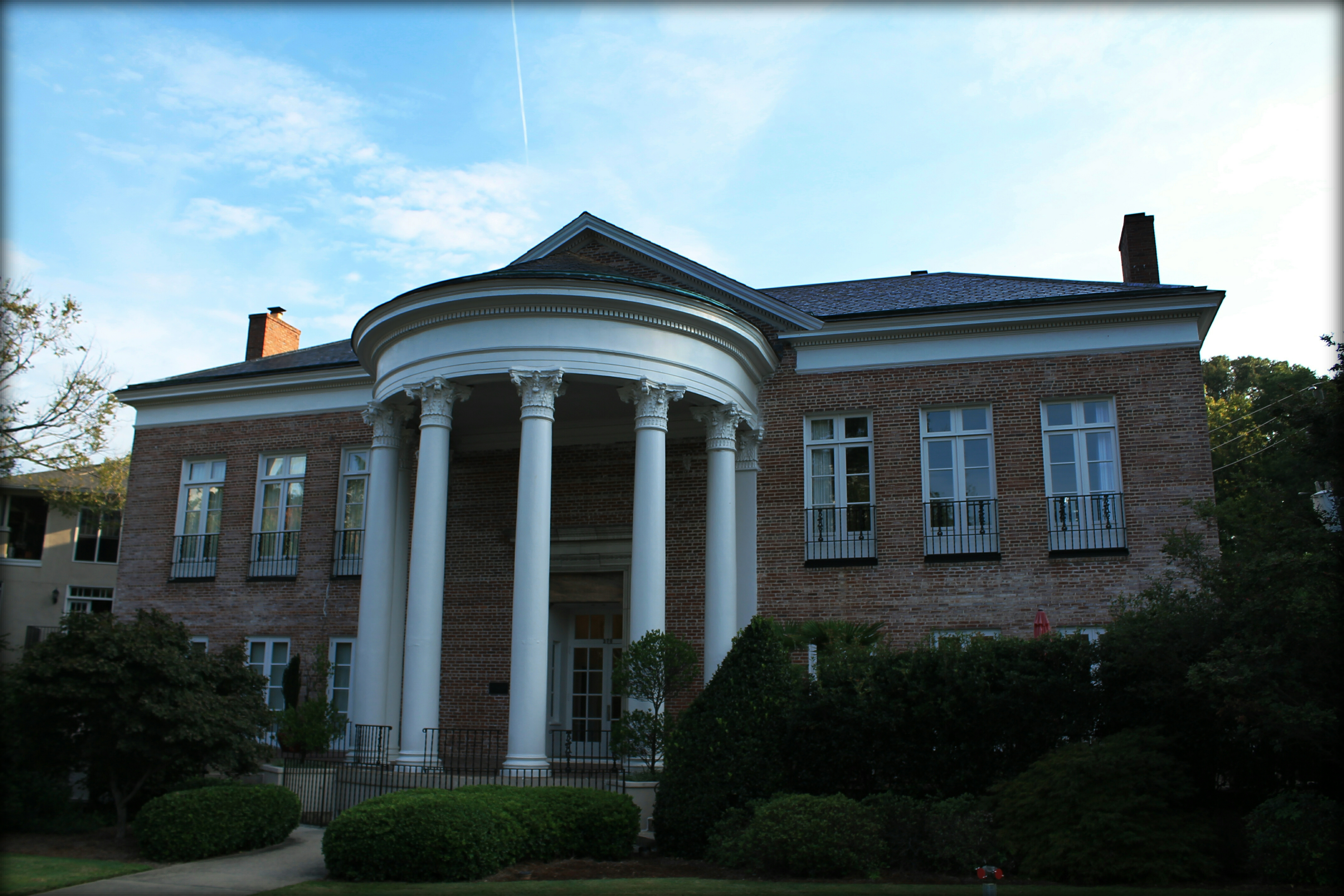
- Habersham Memorial Hall (2014)

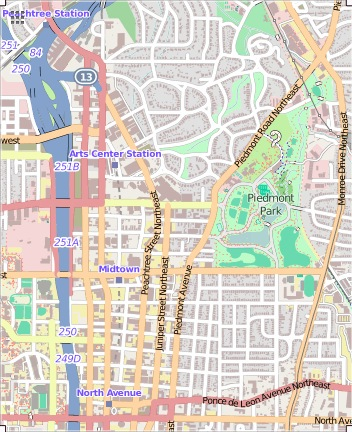
- Location within Atlanta Midtown Location within Atlanta Location within Georgia Location within the United States
- Location: 270 15th Street; Atlanta, Georgia, United States
- Coordinates: 33°47′19″N 84°22′41″W
- Built: 1922
- Architect: Henry Hornbostel
- Architectural style: Federal
- NRHP reference No.: 74000676
- Added to NRHP: June 7, 1974

Habersham Memorial Hall is a historic building in Atlanta, Georgia, United States. The building, named in honor of Joseph Habersham, was designed by Henry Hornbostel to serve as the headquarters for the local chapter of the Daughters of the American Revolution. The building was constructed between 1922 and 1923 and was added to the National Register of Historic Places in 1974.

== History ==
On February 12, 1900, the Joseph Habersham Chapter of the National Society Daughters of the American Revolution was organized at the Georgia Governor's Mansion, with the wife of Georgia Governor Allen D. Candler serving as one of its founders. The chapter, based in Atlanta, was named in honor of Joseph Habersham, a politician from Georgia who had been a soldier in the Continental Army during the American Revolutionary War and served as the United States Postmaster General, among other government positions. On January 14, 1922, the cornerstone for a new headquarters for the chapter was laid, with the building's construction completed the following year. According to the chapter, the building was erected "as a memorial to the Heroes of all Wars in which Georgia has participated." Henry Hornbostel served as the architect for the building, which was designed as a replica of the Bulloch–Habersham House in Savannah, Georgia. In April 1923, the hall hosted the 25th annual state conference of the Georgia Daughters of the American Revolution.

On June 7, 1974, the building was added to the National Register of Historic Places. That same year, a Georgia historical marker was erected near the building.

== Architecture ==
The building has a frontage of 200 feet (61 m). The front of the 2 story building features French doors underneath a hexastyle portico directly beneath the gable. The columns of the portico are of the composite order, blending elements of Ionic and Corinthian columns. The windows on the second story feature guard rails made of cast iron. The brick exterior of the building was previously covered with a white stucco that has since been removed, giving the exterior a slight patina. The Bulloch–Habersham House, of which this building is a replica of, was built in the Federal style.

== See also ==
- National Register of Historic Places listings in Fulton County, Georgia
