= William Jay (minister) =

English nonconformist clergyman

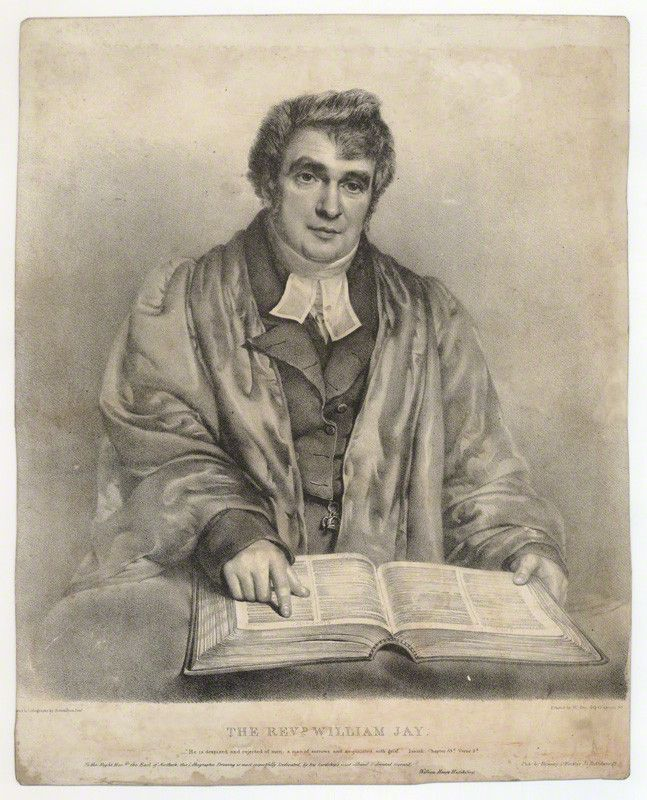

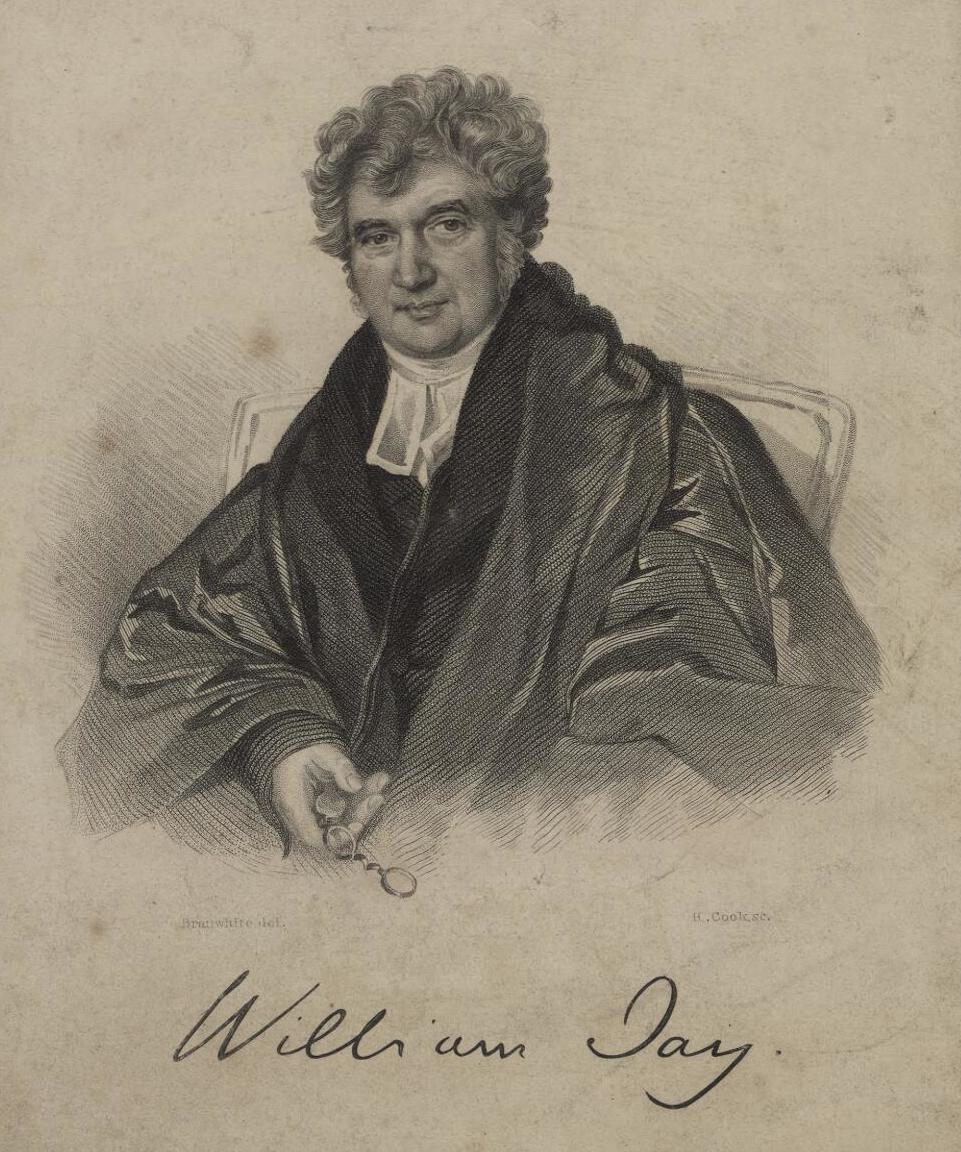
Portrait and signature of William Jay, about 1810

The Rev. William Jay (6 May 1769 – 27 December 1853) was an English nonconformist divine who preached for sixty years at Argyle Chapel in Bath. He was an eminent English Congregationalist minister of Regency England.

== Early life ==
William Jay was born at Tisbury in Wiltshire. He adopted his father's trade of stonemason and worked with him on alterations to Fonthill House, but gave it up in 1785 in order to enter the Rev. Cornelius Winter's school at Marlborough. Before he was twenty-one he had preached nearly a thousand times, and in 1788 he had for a while occupied Rowland Hill's pulpit at the Surrey Chapel in Southwark, London. Wishing to have time for self-education or scholarly interests, he accepted the pastorate of Christian Malford near Chippenham where he remained about two years. This was followed by one year at Hope Chapel, Clifton.

== Life as a preacher and writer ==
On 30 January 1791 Jay was called to the ministry of the Independent or Congregationalist chapel with which he became connected, Argyle Chapel in Bath. Here he followed revivalist principles by preaching to people regardless of religious denomination or social rank; attracting note as a populist pulpit orator, religious author and scholar, and a counselor. Richard Brinsley Sheridan praised his oratorical skills.

William Jay's connection with Argyle Chapel came to an end in January 1853. He died on 27 December following in Bath. Amongst the best-known of his works are his Morning and Evening Exercises; The Christian Contemplated; The Domestic Ministers Assistant; and his Discourses. He also wrote a Life of Rev. Cornelius Winter, Memoirs of Rev. John Clarke and Female Scripture Characters, along with Jay's Works (first published in the early 1840s, and again in 1856, followed by a new edition in 1876).

== Family ==
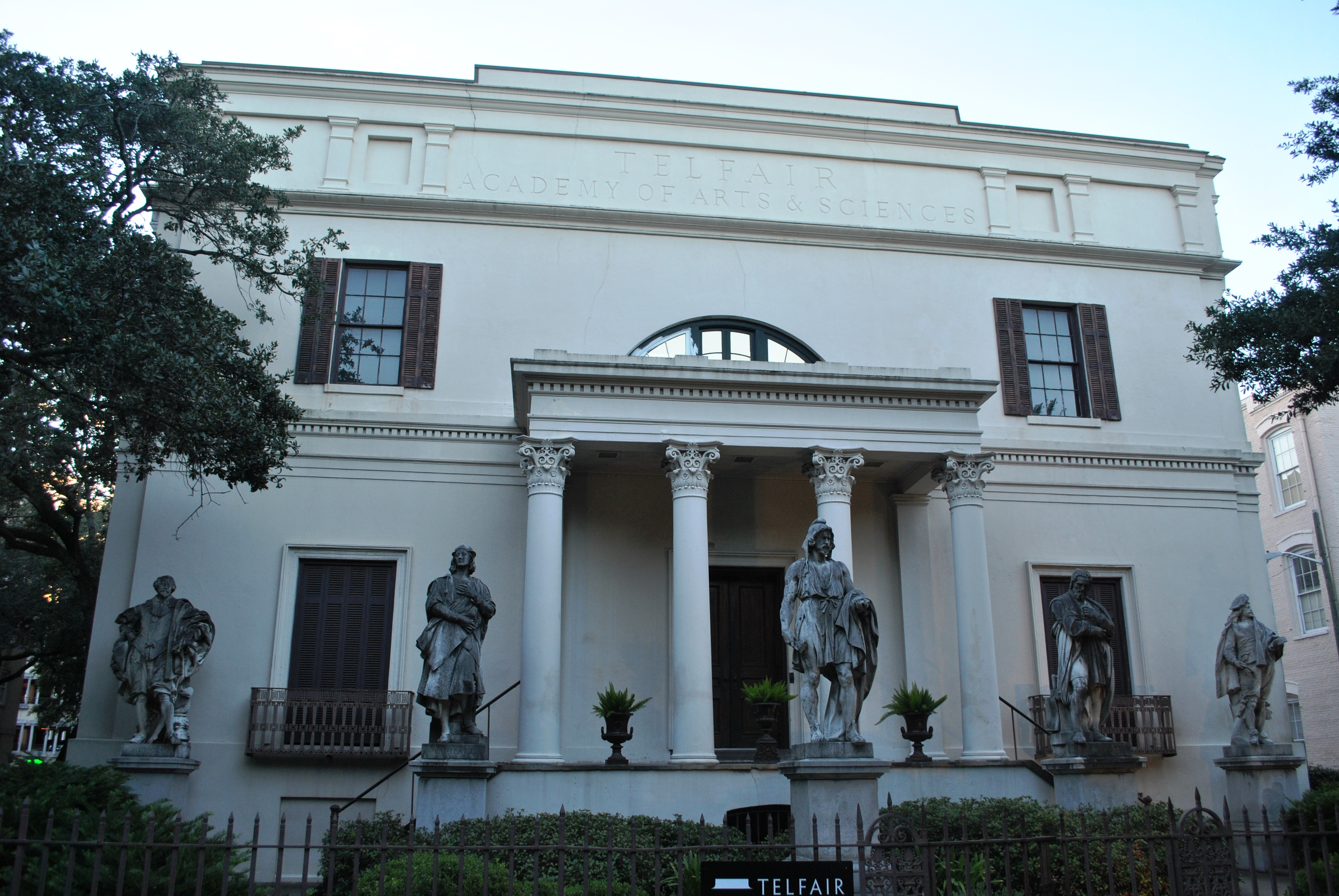
Telfair Academy

One of William Jay's sons, also William Jay (1792/3–1837), became an architect, continuing the family's interest in stonemasonry and building design. William Jay's eldest daughter, Anne, married Robert Bolton and, among their thirteen children was William Jay Bolton, who became an early artisan of stained glass in America.
