= Archibald Bulloch =

American politician (1730–1777)

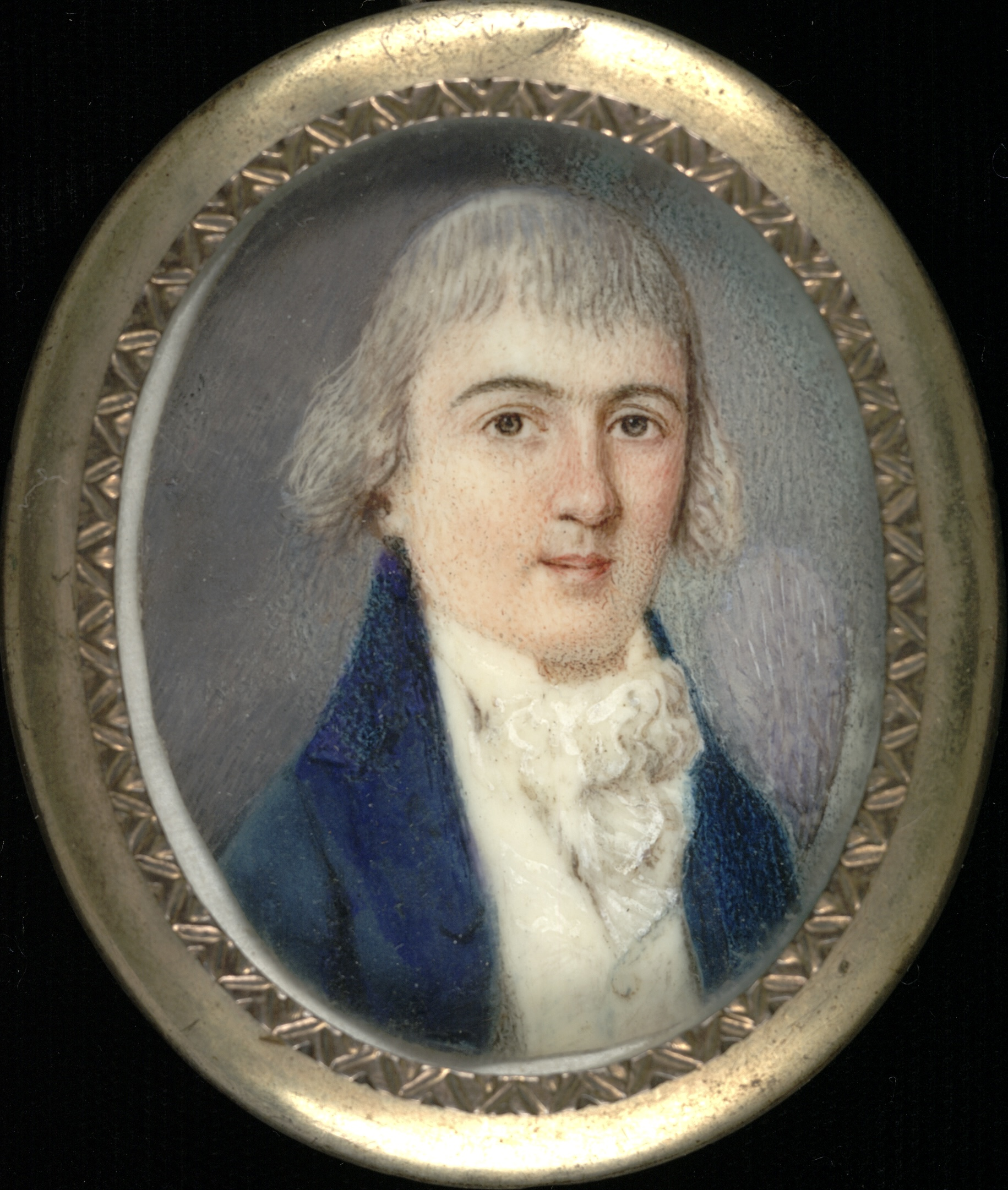
- Posthumous miniature portrait, c. 1790

1st Governor of Georgia
- In office April 15, 1776 – February 22, 1777
- Preceded by: William Ewen (as President of Council of Safety)
- Succeeded by: Button Gwinnett

Delegate from Georgia to the Continental Congress
- In office 1775–1775

Personal details
- Born: January 1, 1730 Charleston, South Carolina, U.S.
- Died: February 22, 1777 (aged 47) Savannah, Georgia, U.S.
- Party: Liberty Party, Whig
- Spouse: Mary De Veaux (m. 1764)
- Profession: lawyer, statesman

Military service
- Allegiance: United States
- Branch/service: Georgia Militia
- Years of service: 1775–1777
- Battles/wars: American Revolutionary War: Battle of the Rice Boats; Raid on Tybee Island

Archibald Stobo Bulloch (January 1, 1730 – February 22, 1777) was an American lawyer, military officer and politician who served as the seventh governor of Georgia from 1776 to 1777. Born in the Province of South Carolina, Bulloch fought in the Georgia Militia during the American Revolution, and was also a great-grandfather of Martha Bulloch Roosevelt, and great-great-grandfather of Theodore Roosevelt, the 26th President of the United States.

== Early life ==
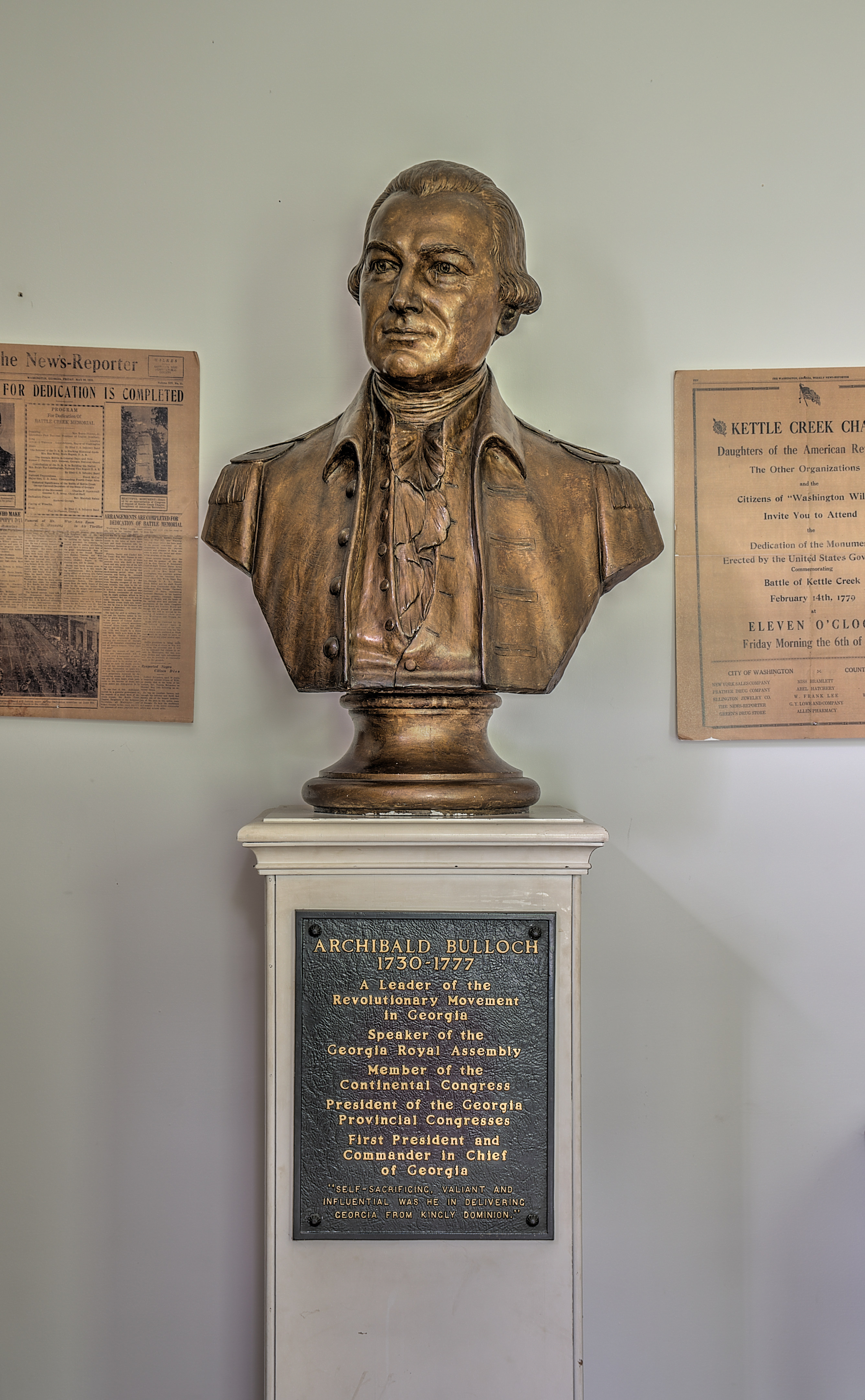
Bust of Bulloch at the Washington-Wilkes Historical Museum

Archibald Stobo Bulloch was born in 1730 in Charleston, South Carolina, to James Bulloch (1701–1780) and Jean Stobo, who were both Scots. He was named after his maternal grandfather, Reverend Archibald Stobo. After receiving his education in Charleston, he began to practice law and was commissioned as a lieutenant in the South Carolina militia.

In 1758, the Bulloch family moved to the Province of Georgia, and in 1764 Bulloch moved to Savannah. He was elected to the colonial legislature in 1768.

== Revolution ==
Bulloch was an early supporter of the revolution in Georgia as a member of the Friends of Liberty. He served as President of the 1st and 2nd Provincial Congresses of Georgia, and was a delegate in 1775 to the Continental Congress. There, he won John Adams's praise for his "Abilities and Fortitude". In the Continental Congress, he was a member of the Secret Committee, which was responsible for gathering war supplies. Speaking to the Provincial Congress, Bulloch said, "This is no time to talk of moderation; in the present instance it ceases to be a virtue."

Bulloch is also recorded as having been a Freemason in Georgia. His name is listed on the 1779 Masonic rolls of Solomon's Lodge No. 1 at Savannah along with George Walton, John Adam Treutlen, James Jackson, Nathaniel Pendelton, and General Samuel Elbert.

Bulloch would have been a signer of the Declaration of Independence, but decided to return to Georgia to aid the revolution there. He wrote to John Adams, "Such a series of Victory having attended the American Arms, emboldens us further to trust in Providence, that has so remarkably interposed in our behalf, and we cannot but entertain the most sanguine Hopes, of still preserving our most invaluable Liberties." Adams was disappointed that Bulloch would not be able to sign the Declaration, saying, "I was greatly disappointed, Sir, in the information you gave me, that you should be prevented from revisiting Philadelphia."

In 1776, Bulloch fought under the command of Colonel Lachlan McIntosh in the Battle of the Rice Boats on March 2. In later March, he led the raid on Tybee Island to recapture fugitive slaves who had fled to the British. On June 20, 1776, he was chosen to be the first President and Commander-in-Chief of Georgia under the state's temporary republican government. When he signed the state constitution on February 20, 1777, his position transferred from president to governor of Georgia. He was thus Georgia's first chief executive under a proper constitutional government, but the third chief executive in all, following the brief tenures of presidents William Ewen and George Walton.

== Death ==
Bulloch died in Savannah while preparing to defend against the British invasion of Georgia in 1777. There is some speculation that he was poisoned, although this has never been proven. His death was a severe blow, as his was the only leadership that united the Whig factions in the troubled young state. He is buried in Savannah's Colonial Park Cemetery.

== Personal life ==
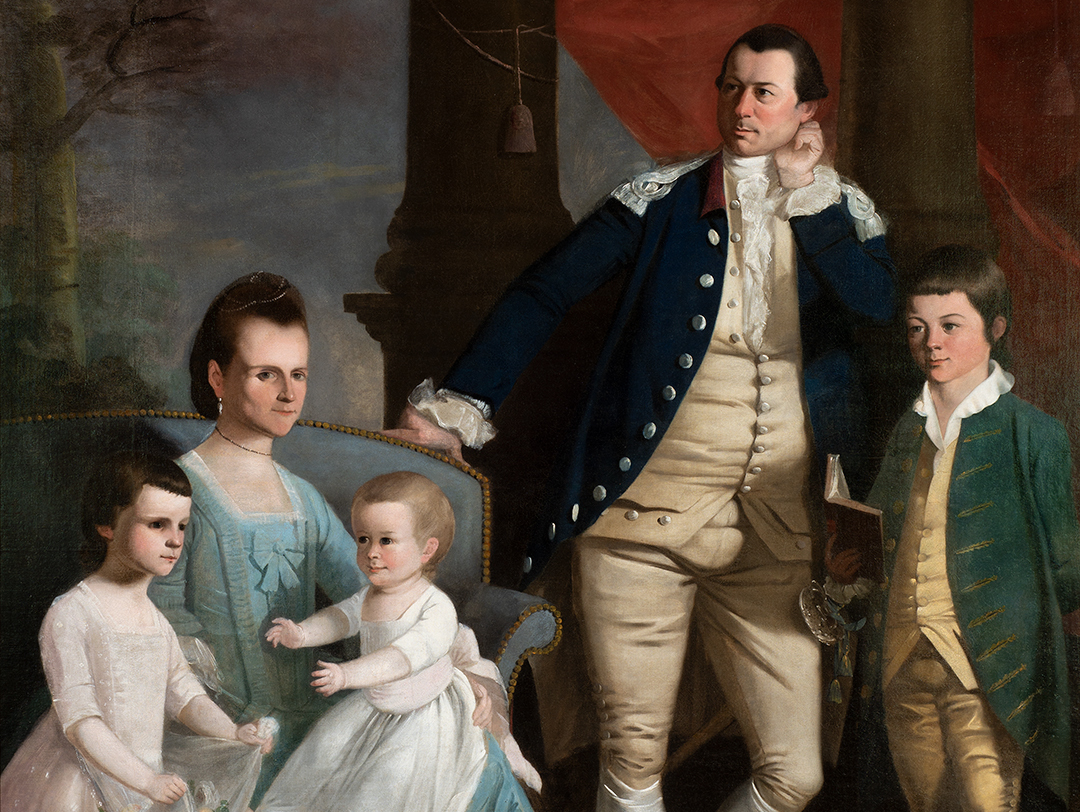
The Archibald Bulloch Family, painted by Henry Benbridge, c. 1775

On October 10, 1764, Bulloch was married to Mary De Veaux (1748–1818), the daughter of Ann (née Fairchild) De Veaux and Col. James De Veaux, a prominent Savannah landowner. Together, they were the parents of:

- Archibald Stobo Bulloch Jr. (1775–1859), who had built the Archibald Bulloch House.
- William Bellinger Bulloch (1777–1852), who later represented Georgia in the United States Senate.

== Legacy ==
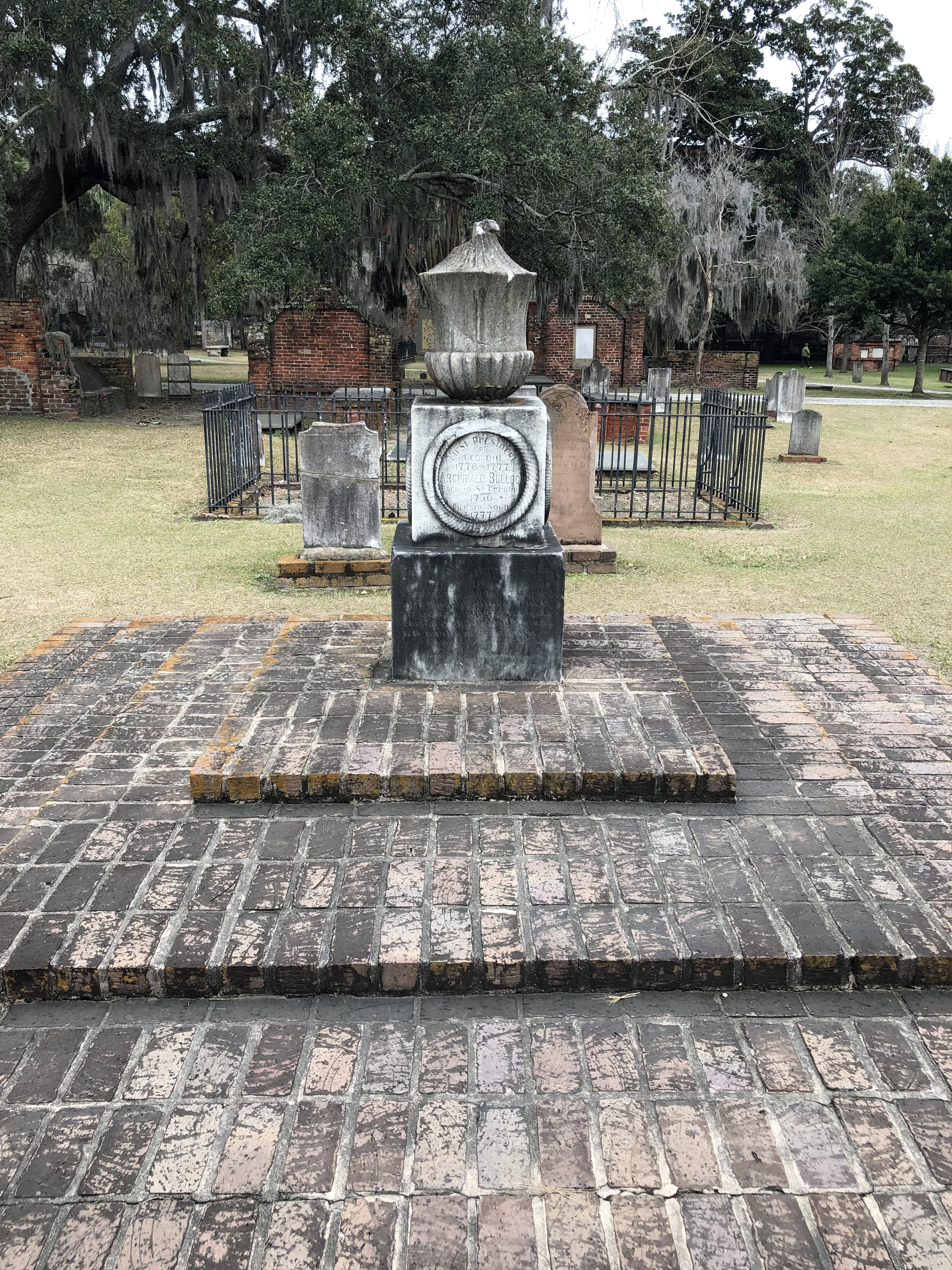
The gravesite of Archibald Bulloch within Colonial Park Cemetery in Savannah, Georgia.

Archibald's great-great-grandson was President Theodore Roosevelt. His great-great-great granddaughter was First Lady of the United States Eleanor Roosevelt. Theodore Roosevelt's son Archibald was named after his ancestor.

Bulloch County, Georgia, is named after him.

Political offices
Preceded by William Ewen (President of Council of Safety)	Governor of Georgia; 1776–1777	Succeeded by Button Gwinnett
