= William Ewen =

American politician (1720–1777)

William Ewen (April 15, 1720 – January 24, 1777) was the first president of the Council of Safety of Georgia during the American Revolution. He is considered the state's first chief executive, although the first chief executive under a proper constitutional government (the "Rules and Regulations" of 1776) was Archibald Bulloch, and the first person to hold the title of (non-royal) "governor" was John A. Treutlen.

== Early life ==
Believed to have been born in England in 1720, Ewen came to Georgia in 1734 as an indentured servant and worked for Thomas Causton, chief magistrate and storekeeper in Savannah, in the Trustee store for the term of two years. A former potter in England, Ewen left his position at the store when that controversial establishment closed, bought goods at discounted prices, and ventured out on his own as an auctioneer in Savannah.

== Political life ==
In 1741, he worked in the private store of John Bromfield, and became one of the so-called "Malcontents" who opposed the Trustees of the colony. Trustee secretary William Stephens wrote about Ewen: "There is not a more virulent little mischief maker among ‘em, this Ewen". Ewen was elected to the Commons House of Assembly on March 25, 1761, working under provincial governor Sir James Wright. Ewen was elected president of the Council of Safety on June 22, 1775, and served until December 11, 1775. He served alongside other famous Revolutionary War heroes of Georgia including Seth John Cuthbert, Joseph Habersham, Edward Telfair, William LeConte, Basil Cowper, Joseph Clay, George Walton, John Glenn, Samuel Elbert, William Young, Elisha Butler, George Houston, John Smith, Francis H. Harris and John Morel.

When news of the Stamp Act reached Georgia, it ignited the revolutionary movement with Ewen at the forefront as a Son of Liberty. By the end of January 1775, Ewen, with many others, signed the Continental Association, adding Georgia to the colonies against the rule of Great Britain.

Ewen returned to the Council of Safety, acting as president pro tempore for the absent Elisha Butler, from February 20, 1776, through May 1, 1776.

== Personal life ==
Ewen was a leader in the Anglican Church in Georgia, holding several offices for the parish of Christ Church. Sometime before 1760 (the exact date being unknown), Ewen wed Margaretha Waldhauer of the Salzburg Protestants settlement in Ebenezer.

Political offices
Preceded by none	President of the Georgia Council of Safety; 1775	Succeeded by George Walton
Preceded by George Walton	President of the Georgia Council of Safety; 1776	Succeeded by Archibald Bulloch
