= Andrew K. Frank =

American historian

- Born: March 21, 1970; New York, United States
- Occupations: university professor, historian

Andrew K. Frank is an American historian who specializes in the American Indians, History of Florida, and the history of the Seminole Tribe of Florida.

Frank earned his B.A. from Brandeis University in 1992 and his Ph.D. from the University of Florida in 1998. He has taught at University of Massachusetts Amherst, California State University, Los Angeles, and Florida Atlantic University, He joined the history department at Florida State University in 2007 and is currently the Allen Morris Professor of History and the inaugural director of FSU's Native American and Indigenous Studies Center.

== Works ==
Frank has written 3 academic books, edited 4 academic books, and written 3 books for younger students. He has also written around forty book reviews in such journals as American Historical Review, Journal of American History, Journal of Southern History, Journal of the Early Republic, Ethnohistory and many others. His most recent book Before the Pioneers: Indians, Settlers, Slaves, and the Founding of Miami was published by the University Press of Florida in 2018. It was widely reviewed and earned an invitation to present at the Miami Book Fair and elsewhere.

== Bibliography ==
- Before the Pioneers: Indians, Settlers, Slaves, and the Founding of Miami (Gainesville: University Press of Florida, 2017)
- Creeks and Southerners: Biculturalism on the Early American Frontier (Lincoln: University of Nebraska Press, 2005)
- The Routledge Historical Atlas of the American South (New York: Routledge, 1999)
- Borderland Narratives: Negotiation and Accommodation in North America's Contested Spaces, 1500-1850 with A. Glenn Crothers (Gainesville: University Press of Florida, 2017)
- Selling War in a Media Age: The Presidency and Public Opinion in the American Century, with Kenneth Osgood and introduction by David Halberstam (Gainesville: University Press of Florida, 2010)
