= William Jay (architect) =

19th-century English architect working in US

- Jay, pictured around 1817
- Born: 16 November 1792; Bath, England
- Died: 17 April 1837 (aged 44); Port Louis, Mauritius
- Occupation: Architect
- Spouse: Louisa Coulson
- Children: 3
- Parent: William Jay

William Jay (16 November 1792 – 17 April 1837) was an architect. He designed several notable buildings, firstly in London, then in Savannah, Georgia, United States.

== Early life ==
Jay was born in Bath, England, the second child and oldest son of William Jay Sr. He started working with his father as a stonemason, but became a Congregationalist minister. In 1807, the younger William became an apprentice of the architect and surveyor David Riddall Roper.

== Career ==
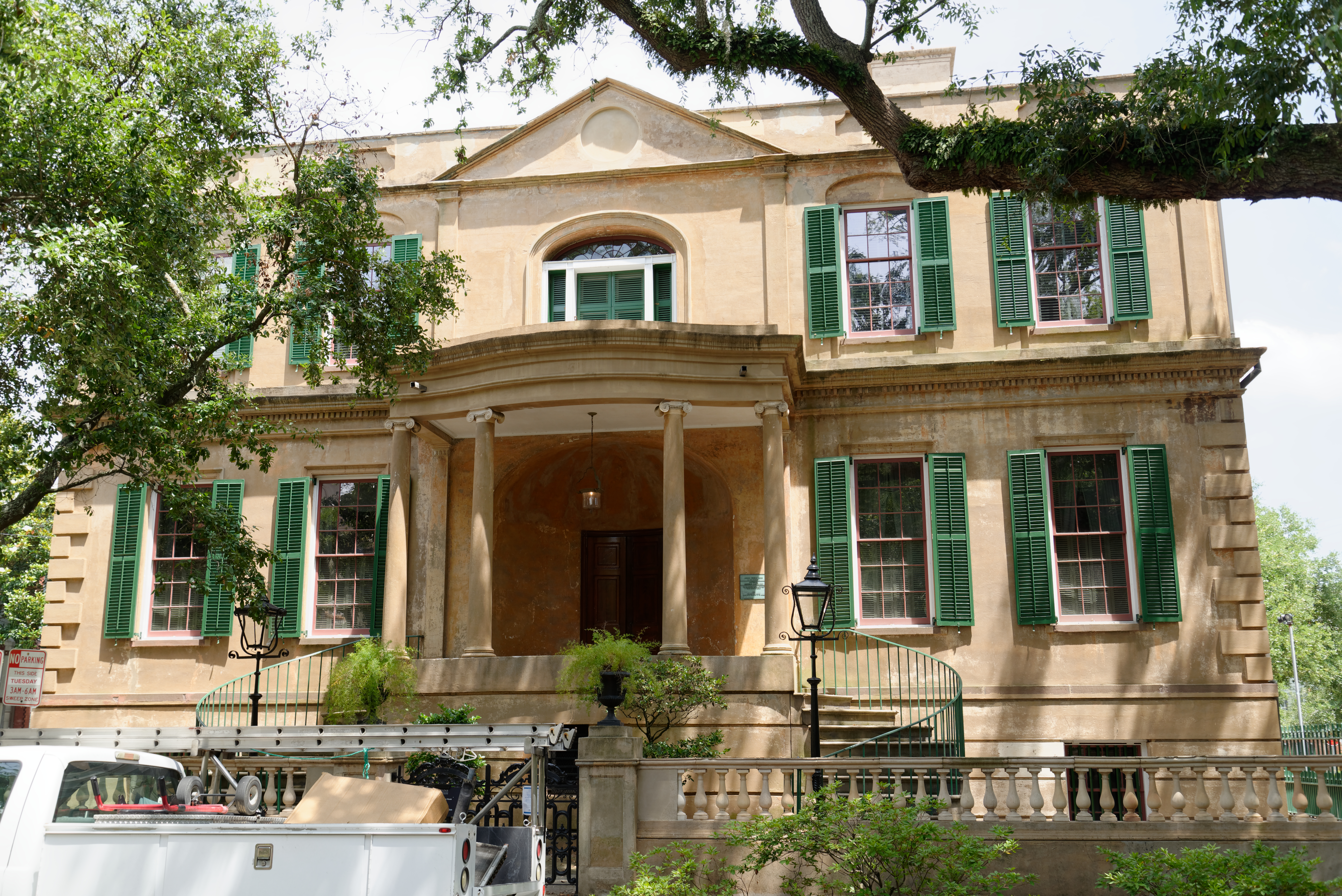
Owens-Thomas House, designed by Jay

Jay's designs for Surrey Chapel Almshouses were exhibited at the Royal Academy in 1814. He designed Dr. Fletcher's Albion Chapel in London, laying the foundation stone the following year.

In December 1817, he moved to the United States for four years, where he established as an architect in Savannah, Georgia. His American work includes the Bulloch–Habersham House, the Owens–Thomas House, the William Scarbrough House, Telfair Academy and the original 1818 Savannah Theatre. The design of the now-demolished Archibald Bulloch House, which he designed, was later replicated in the Habersham Memorial Hall. It has been suggested that Jay also designed the Juliette Gordon Low House at the corner of Bull Street and Oglethorpe Avenue.

== Family ==
In 1827, Jay married Louisa Coulson of Henley-on-Thames. They had three children between 1829 and 1835; the oldest child, also William, died soon after the family's arrival in Mauritius at the age of six. Jay's widow and other two children returned to England after his death.

== Later life and death ==
When the economy of Georgia collapsed in 1822, Jay returned to England and worked primarily in Cheltenham. Later, he went bankrupt and, in 1836, moved with his family to the island of Mauritius, where he was an architect and civil engineer until his death in Port Louis in 1837, aged 44.

== Notable works ==
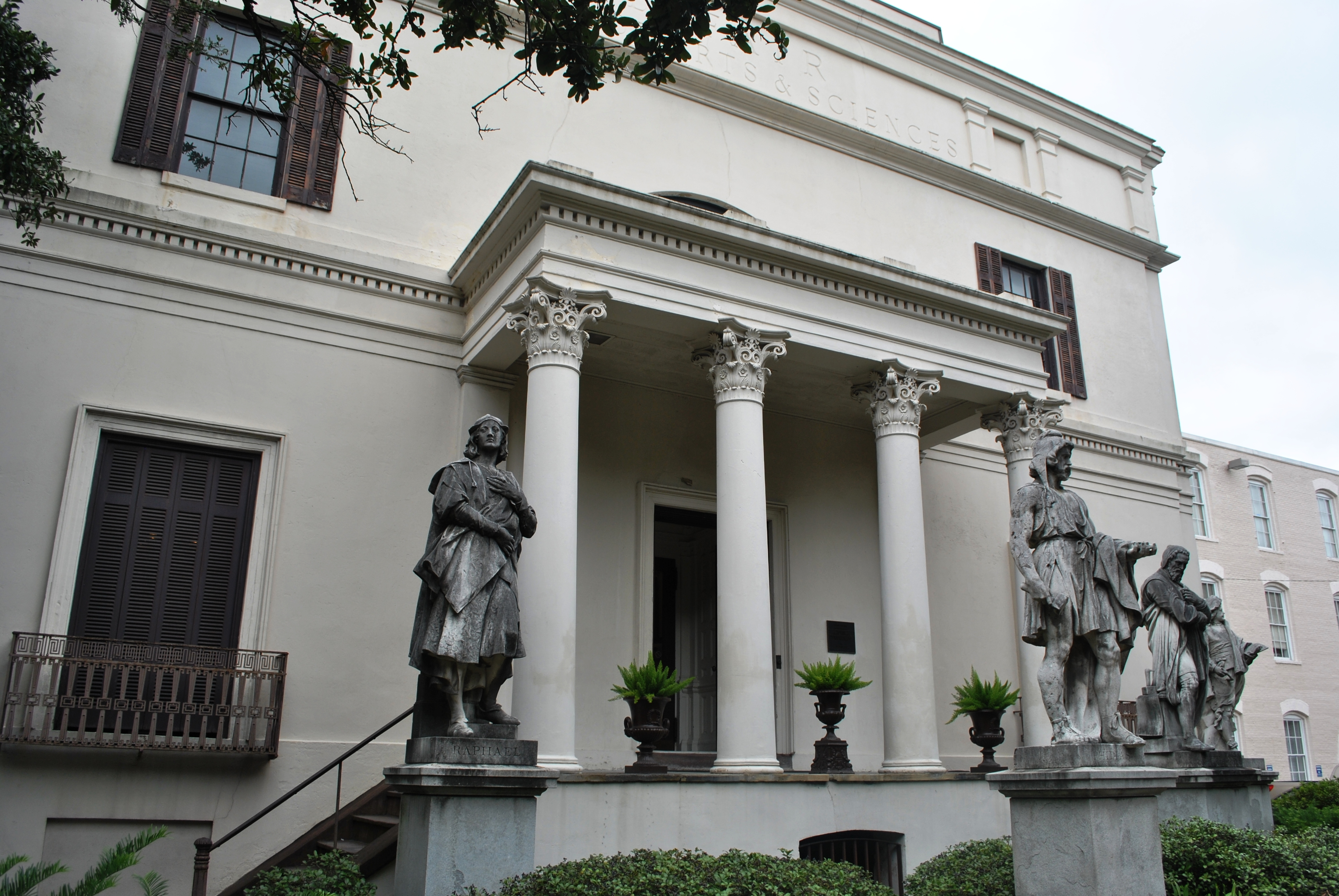
Telfair Family Mansion, Savannah, Georgia

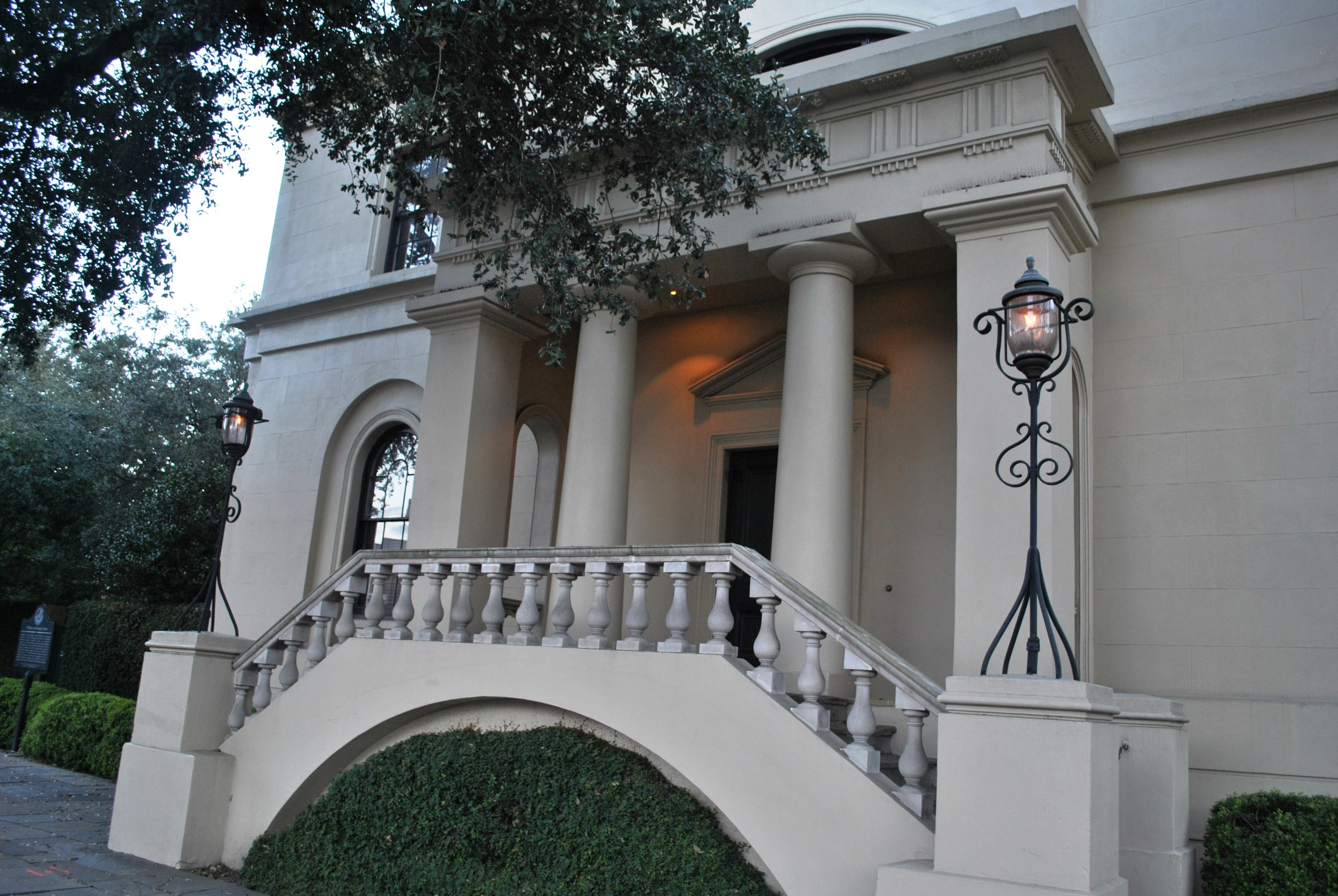
William Scarborough House, Savannah, Georgia

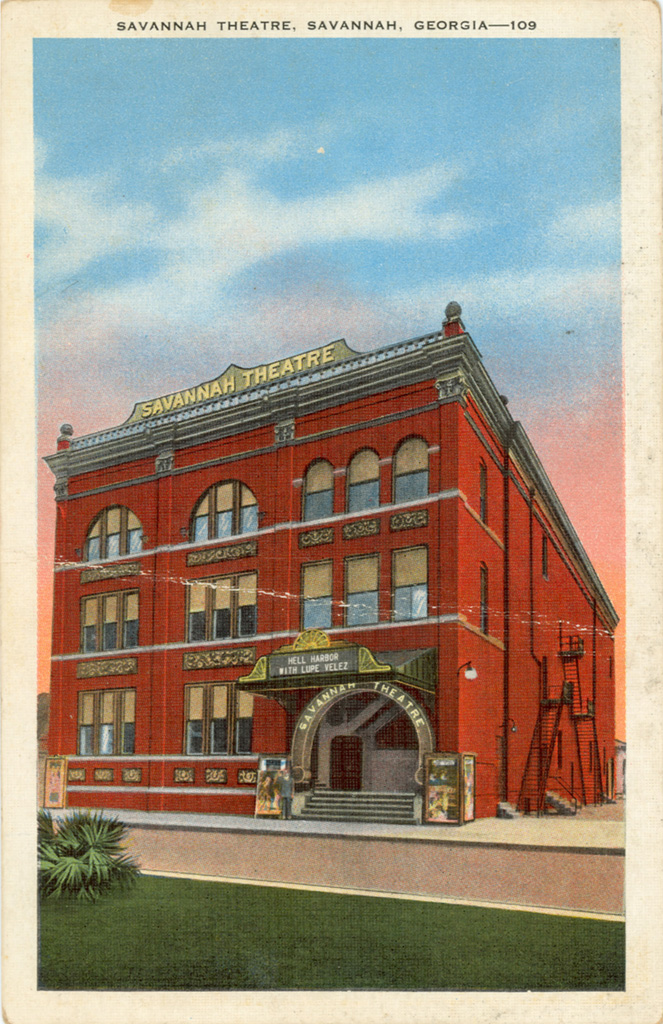
Savannah Theatre, Savannah, Georgia, in its original form

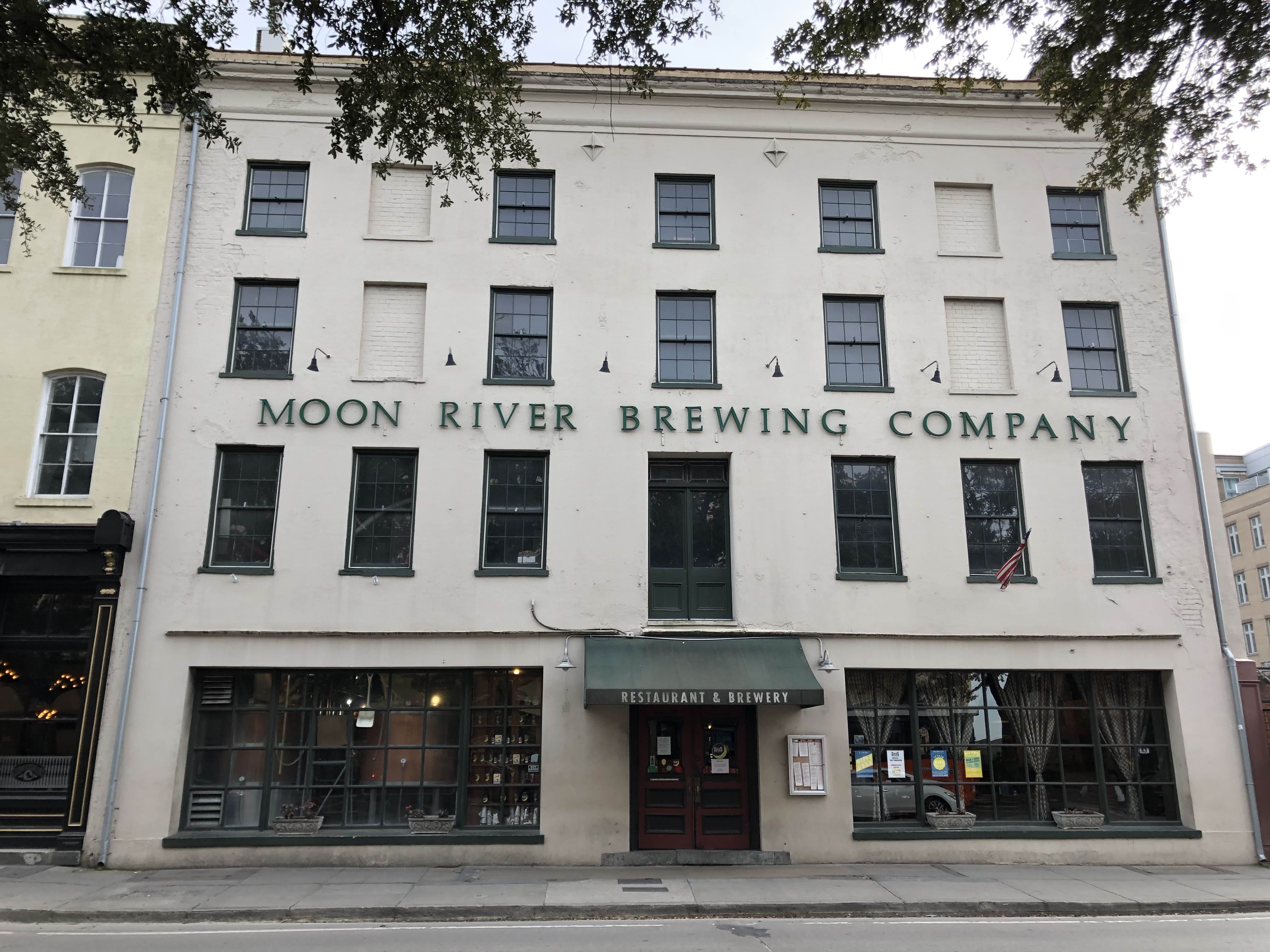
21 West Bay Street, Savannah, Georgia
