= John Baptist Austin =

English schoolmaster and minister, later in South Australia

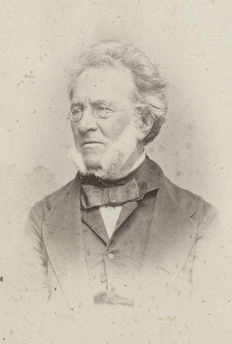
- Photograph of John Baptist Austin, c.1870
- Born: 1799
- Died: 1882 (aged 82–83)
- Occupations: schoolmaster, minister
- Title: The Reverend

John Baptist Austin III (1799–1882) was an English schoolmaster and minister. He emigrated in 1843 and settled in South Australia.

== John Baptist Austin II ==
His father was the surgeon John Baptist Austin II: a family tradition held that he had been called to attend in 1797 after Mary Lamb's fatal stabbing of her mother Elizabeth. He was in a druggist partnership with Robert Saddington, based at Tower Royal, near the junction of Cannon Street and Watling Street: it was dissolved in 1808. In 1810 he was made bankrupt, as a druggist in Kentish Town. He was later based in New Alresford, Hampshire, and partnered another surgeon, William Winter. That partnership was dissolved in 1827. He had 16 children, the youngest being born c.1822.

== Early life ==
Austin was born on Christmas Day 1799, in Hertford. He was educated at Merchant Taylors School, London, from 1809. He left before he turned 14. He was apprenticed to the surgeon James Scott of Bromley. Going into business himself in London as a surgeon, he attracted the attention of George Birkbeck, who helped him find work as a lecturer. He maintained an interest in the work of the Society for the Diffusion of Useful Knowledge.

Around 1827 Austin moved to Hastings, where he set up a school. His pupils included Henry John Congreve and his brother William. He sent them a South Australian newspaper, which had a direct bearing on Harry Congreve's decision to emigrate later himself. Isaac Todhunter became a noted pupil, and then an usher in the school. He moved to Austin's school on the recommendation of the Rev. William Davis, a minister with a chapel in Hastings. Another pupil was John Eyre Ashby, who went on to become a Congregationalist minister.

Accompanied by Isaac Todhunter, Austin moved his school to Peckham, then a village south of London, around 1835. He adopted the name "Goldsmith House" for it, playing on the episode in the early history of Oliver Goldsmith during which he was usher at the Peckham Presbyterian academy of the terminally ill Dr John Milner (1688–1757).

Austin began preaching at Guestling, near Hastings. After he moved to London, he became involved in the Christian Instruction Society of the mid-1830s. It was a branch of the Congregationalists concerned to supply preaching in areas on the outskirts of London. It led to the building of a chapel at Nun Green, Peckham Rye, (now known as Nunhead Green), opened in 1836, where Austin was ordained minister around 1837.

== Australia ==
Before leaving England, Austin took steps to acquire land near Macclesfield, South Australia; he bought 500 acres (200 ha) of land through the banker Roger Cunliffe (Cunliffe, Brooks). The transaction was connected to the Special Survey of more than 4,000 acres (1,600 ha) in the area carried out in 1839 for the banker George Davenport, banker and agent of the South Australian Company, with two partners, Cunliffe being one of the partners. George Davenport (1782–1846) was the father of Robert Davenport and Samuel Davenport. A service to mark the departure of the Austin family was held on 14 September 1843 in the Albany Chapel, Camberwell, led by the Rev. George Rose.

Austin and family sailed to Adelaide in the barque Augustus, arriving at the end of 1843. On arrival, Austin made his way to Macclesfield, where he was well received by Samuel Davenport and his wife. With Alexander Lang Elder (his future son-in-law) as agent, he bought land at Bugle Ranges from Frederick Harrison, in an area first granted to the Davenport family. There he built his dwelling "Lashbrooke". The initial slab hut was replaced by a stone building by the end of the 1840s.

Holding services in a tent, Austin began a ministry at Macclesfield. From 1844 he had regular preaching stations: at Echunga in Walter Duffield's house; at Mount Barker in Denman McFarlane's barn; at Strathalbyn, where a church was built in 1844 and he held services every two weeks; and at Bugle Range's, at a place later called Zion's Hill. In his religious work he collaborated with Thomas Stow. A stone chapel was built at Macclesfield, on land granted by the trustees of George Davenport, the foundation stone being laid in 1848.

== Family ==
Austin married, firstly or secondly, in 1826, Margaret Young, daughter of Edward Young. She died in 1840, aged 36, leaving him a family of seven children.

Austin in 1841 married at Finsbury Chapel, with Alexander Fletcher officiating, Matilda Lashbrooke. She was the daughter of the late John Lashbrooke, of Trinity Square Gardens, Tower Hill. She died at Lashbrooke in 1871. He married again, in 1872, to Phoebe Davies Hinton, fourth daughter of John Howard Hinton.

When he came to Australia in 1843, Austin had eight children with him.

- His daughter Mary Eliza married in 1847 Alexander Lang Elder, founder of Elder & Co.
- His son John Baptist Austin IV (died 1896) was a journalist and mining expert, one-time partner of H. W. de Mole.
- Edward Austin (1836–1915), left manuscript memoirs describing his life, including contact with Aboriginal people at Coorong. They also cover demographic effects of the Victorian gold rush. He recalled the initial times as hard, with "rough tents to sleep in" as typical. His son Alfred Herbert Austin (1870–1930), pastor at Mosman, married Charlotte Elizabeth Fullerton.
- Edwin Austin (died 1915) married the daughter of the Rev. Samuel Link Harris, minister at Macclesfield and father of Charles Hope Harris.
