= Albion Chapel =

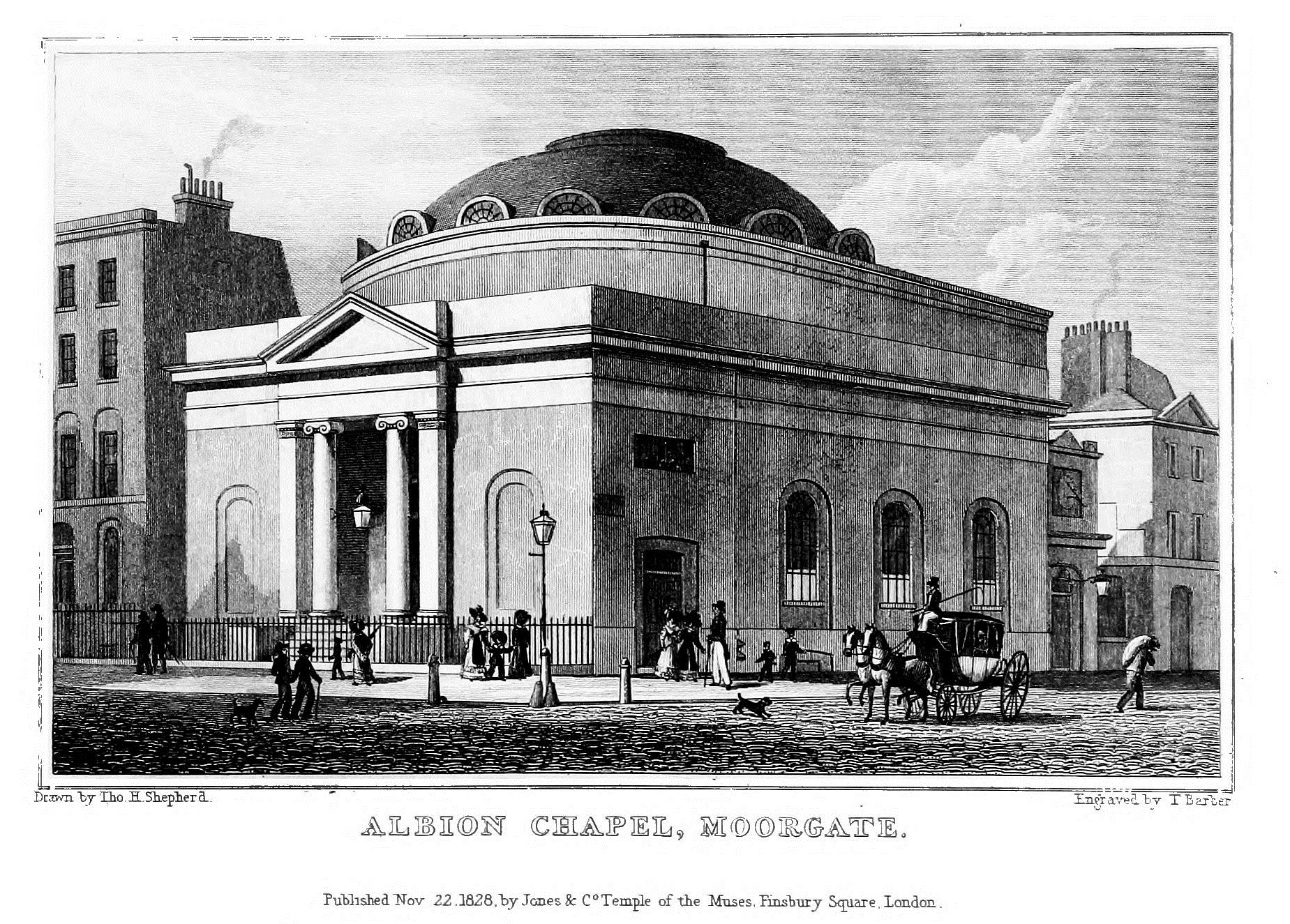
- Albion Chapel, from Metropolitan improvements; or London in the Nineteenth Century by James Elmes (1827)
- Albion Chapel
- 51°31′03″N 0°05′18″W
- Location: City of London
- Country: England
- Denomination: Scottish Presbyterian

History
- Status: Demolished
- Founded: 1815
- Founder: Reverend Alexander Fletcher

Architecture
- Architect: William Jay
- Groundbreaking: 7 November 1815
- Demolished: 1879

Albion Chapel was a Scottish Presbyterian chapel in the City of London, near Finsbury Circus, on the corner of London Wall and Finsbury Pavement. It was established by Reverend Alexander Fletcher on the site of the old Bethlem Royal Hospital in 1815 and demolished in 1879. It was designed by William Jay (1792/3-1837), who later became a leading architect in the United States.

== History ==
The first stone of the construction for the Albion Chapel was laid on 7 November 1815 by Reverend Alexander Fletcher, the Minister of a Church of Scotland assembly near Oxford Street. The stone contained several objects inside, including a Bible, some coins and a copy each of the Westminster Confession of Faith and The Assembly's Shorter Catechism. The location that the Chapel was being built on was formerly the west wing of Bethlem Royal Hospital. The building was the first commission of architect William Jay.

Alexander Fletcher was established at the Chapel until 1824, when as a result of a legal challenge brought to him by a Miss Dick regarding the breach of a promise of marriage, the Scottish Presbyterian Church suspended him of his duties. A crowd of his supporters gathered outside the Chapel on the following Sunday expecting a service. Despite the Church's ban on him, Fletcher spoke from the pulpit and announced that he would continue to preach despite the orders from Scotland. By the end of December, Fletcher had left Albion Chapel. In July of the following year, he started to erect a new chapel at Finsbury Circle.

The Chapel underwent repairs and renovations, reopening on 7 February 1847. The building was demolished in 1879 to make way for Tower Chambers.
