= John Morison (pastor) =

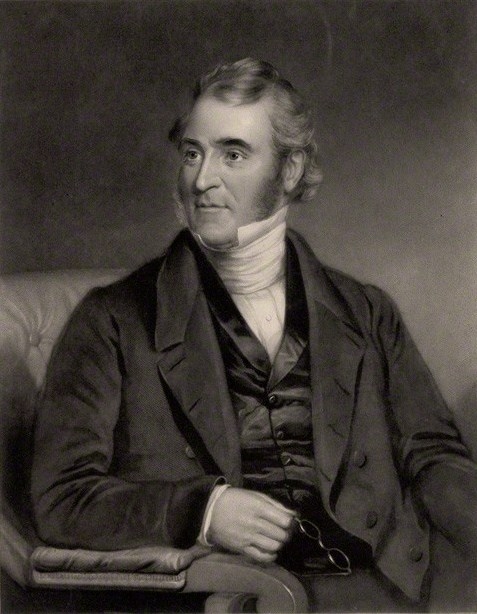
- John Morison, engraving by John Whitehead after Henry Room
- Born: 1791
- Died: 13 June 1859
- Occupation: Pastor
- Known for: London Missionary Society; Abolitionism

John Morison (1791–1859) (also Morrison) was a Scottish Protestant minister in London. He was a longstanding editor of the Evangelical Magazine & Missionary Chronicle, author of theological and biographical subjects, and a Congregational pastor at Trevor Chapel, Knightsbridge, London. He was known for his bold and fervid utterances on the platform, his enthusiastic advocacy of the work of the London Missionary Society, and support for the abolition of slavery in the USA.

== Life and work ==
=== Abolition and evangelical work ===
A native of Scotland, John Morison became one of the principal representatives of Congregationalism in London, during the mid-nineteenth century and a committee member of the London Missionary Society.

He was ordained 17 February 1815, and became pastor of a congregation at Union Chapel, Sloane Street, Chelsea. In 1816 a larger place of worship was provided for him in the same parish. At the close of that year Trevor Chapel was opened, where he ministered for more than forty years. From about 1827 till 1857 he was editor of the Evangelical Magazine.

Along with fellow London Missionary Society committee member, Thomas Raffles of Liverpool, and his friend the Alexander Fletcher of Finsbury Chapel, he was honoured to be one of the three people to whom the escaped slave Moses Roper brought a letter of introduction on his arrival in Britain, seeking assistance and patronage to pursue his object of promoting the cause of emancipation and abolition. To Morison, Moses Roper gave the task of revising the manuscript of his autobiography, A Narrative of the Adventures and Escapes of Moses Roper, but though illness he was compelled to pass this task, and preparation of the preface, to the Rev. Dr T. Price.

An enthusiastic public speaker, Dr Morison, was frequently in demand as a platform speaker for Evangelical societies and meetings in London, frequently held at Exeter Hall. His style can be seen from this 'Discourse Preached on the Occasion of the Demise of George Fourth' entitled 'God the Setter Up of Kings and Remover of Kings' (1830):

It is now many years since our nation proscribed all traffic in human flesh, and made it felonious to steal men from the shores of Africa. And yet, in spite of all the discussions in and out of parliament on this mournful topic, slavery yet exists in our West Indian colonies, and seems equally to defy coercive and conciliatory measures. O cruel, accursed slavery! -what a scourge hast thou proved to millions of the human race! On Africa's shores, how many hearts hast thou left bleeding and in despair... Let Christians awake from their lethargy on this subject, and let the struggle of principle effect that at last which the struggle of politics will never be able to accomplish.

=== Trevor Chapel ===
Dr Morrison's chapel, Trevor Chapel, was situated at Trevor Square (formerly Arthur Street), Knightsbridge, Kensington, and was demolished in the 1950s after being taken over for use by Harrods department store.

In his early pastorate he had worked as minister at Union Chapel, Sloane Street. However, he resigned and was followed by some of his Independent congregation, who met in Smith & Baber's floorcloth factory during 1816, until they could complete the building of their own Independent chapel at corner of Arthur Street and Lancelot Place. This opened in December 1816, largely paid for by a member of his congregation, John Souter, who bought a lease for the site of chapel, and several houses, in Trevor Square. Dr Morrison's Chapel was later enlarged, during the 1830s, and was completed with schoolrooms by the end of the decade. Shortly after his death a gallery was added in the 1860s, to the Congregational Chapel. He was succeeded at the chapel by his co-pastor, who also succeeded him as Editor of the Evangelical Magazine and Missionary Chronicle.

=== Death and memorial ===
He died in London on 13 June 1859. Dr Morison is buried at the Congregationalists's non-denominational Victorian garden cemetery, Abney Park Cemetery, Stoke Newington, London, by a pedimented pedestal memorial of white marble.

== Family ==
He married in 1815 Elizabeth, second daughter of James Murray of Banff, and had several children.

== Sources ==
- Joyce, Paul (1985), A Guide to Abney Park Cemetery, London: SAPC & L.B.Hackney
- French, James Branwhite (1883), A Guide to Abney Park Cemetery, London:James Clarke & Co

== Books ==
- Morrison, John (c.1830s-50s), The Evangelical Magazine and Missionary Chronicle, London:Ward & Co.
