= Thomas Toke Lynch =

English nonconformist minister and hymn-writer

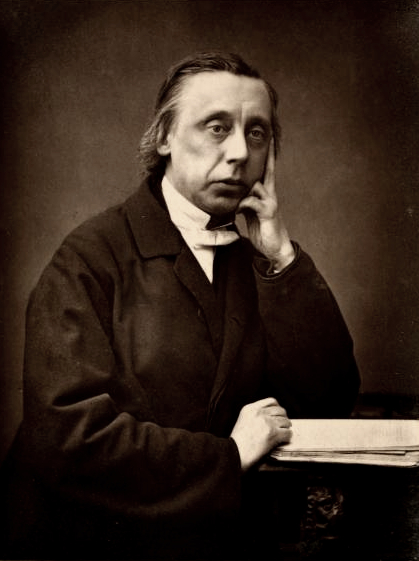
Thomas Toke Lynch, 1864 photograph

Thomas Toke Lynch (1818–1871) was an English nonconformist minister and hymn-writer.

== Life ==
The son of John Burke Lynch, a surgeon, he was born at Great Dunmow, Essex, 5 July 1818. He was educated at a school in Islington, London, where he then became an usher (teaching assistant). In 1841 he became a Sunday school teacher and district visitor, occasionally preaching and giving lectures on sight-singing and temperance.

In 1843 Lynch entered Highbury Independent College, but then shortly withdrew, largely for health reasons. He was pastor of Highgate Independent Church 1847–9, and of a congregation in Mortimer Street, which migrated to Grafton Street, Fitzroy Square, 1849–52. In 1852 he delivered a course of lectures on literature at the Royal Institution, Manchester.

In failing health, Lynch resigned his charge in 1856, but resumed it in 1860 in Gower Street, pending the opening of Mornington Church, a new structure in the Hampstead Road, where he ministered to his death on 9 May 1871. Lynch's congregations were small, and he was not liked as a preacher. The church was pulled down in 1888, for the enlargement of Euston Station.

== Works ==
Lynch is best known for his Hymns for Heart and Voice: The Rivulet, first issued in 1855 (2nd edit. 1856, 3rd edit. 1868). They were criticised as pantheistic and theologically unsound: the Rivulet controversy ensued. Lynch himself replied to his opponents in The Ethics of Quotation, and in a pamphlet of doggerel verse, entitled Songs Controversial (both London, 1856, and issued under the pseudonym "Silent Long"). An account of the controversy is given in his Memoir.

Nine of Lynch's hymns were included in the Congregational Church Hymnal (London, 1887). Lift up your heads, rejoice, All faded is the glowing light, and Where is thy God, my soul? are still known.

He was the author of several prose works, as well as lectures, addresses, sermons, controversial tracts, and magazine articles:

- Thoughts on a Day (1844).
- Memorials of Theophilus Trinal (1850).
- Essays on some of the Forms of Literature (1863).
- Sermons to my Curates, edited by the Rev. Samuel Cox (1871).
- Letters, etc., contributed to "Christian Spectator," 1855-6 (1872).

He was a musician, and composed Tunes to Hymns in the "Rivulet," twenty-five of which, edited by Thomas Pettit, were published after Lynch's death under that title (London, 1872), with a preface signed "Theodore Burkeson" found among Lynch's papers. His portrait appears in his Memoir of Thomas Toke Lynch (1874), editor William White.

== Family ==
In September 1849, Lynch married a daughter of the Rev. Edward Porter of Highgate.
