= Alexander Lang Elder =

Australian politician

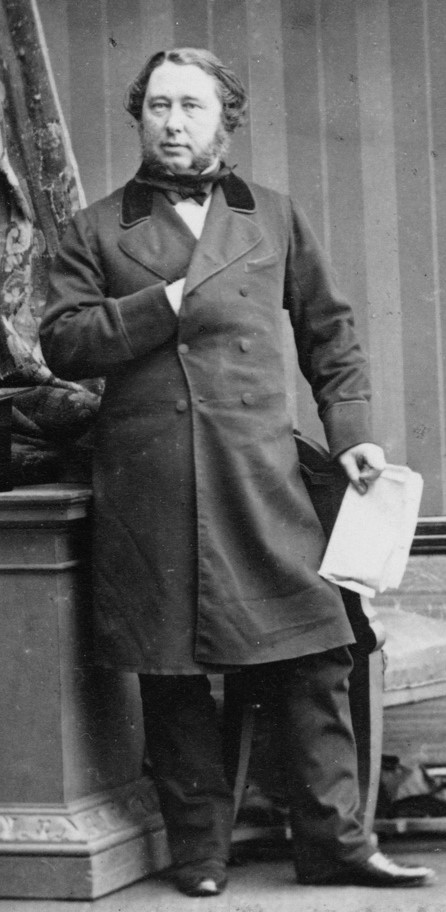

Alexander Lang Elder (18 April 1815 – 5 September 1885) was a Scottish-Australian businessman and politician in colonial South Australia.

== Biography ==
Elder was the second son of George Elder of Kirkcaldy, Fife, Scotland, by Joanna Haddo, his wife, daughter of Alexander Lang, of Leith, born at Kirkcaldy. He was the brother of pastoralist and businessman Thomas Elder. He emigrated on his father's schooner Minerva to South Australia, arriving on 2 January 1840 in Port Adelaide as the only cabin passenger, under Captain David Reid.

He founded the well-known mercantile firm of Elders Limited, later Elder, Smith & Co., of Adelaide. He was a partner with Frederick Dutton in a 20,000 acres (8,100 ha) pastoral lease at Mount Remarkable in 1846.

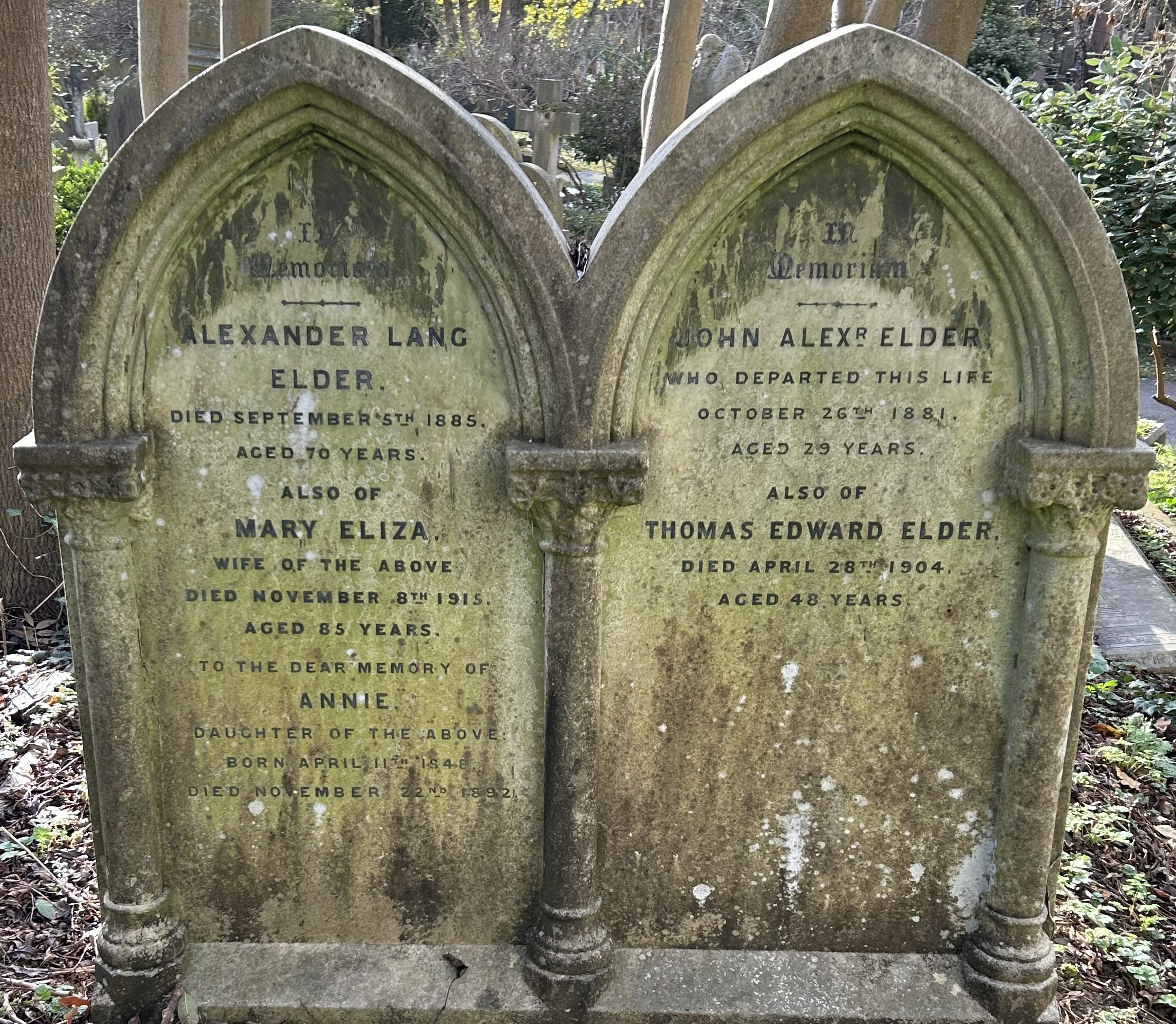
Grave of Alexander Elder in Highgate Cemetery

He married Mary Eliza Austin, a daughter of Rev. John Baptist Austin of South Australia, on 8 April 1847.

He was elected by the West Adelaide district to the first mixed franchise Legislative Council in 1851, but resigned his seat on 30 March 1853, leaving for England, where he headed of the firm of A. L. Elder & Co., of London, until his death in London on 5 September 1885. He was buried on the eastern side of Highgate Cemetery.

== Legacy ==
The Elder Range, adjacent to Wilpena Pound, and its highest point, Mt Aleck, are named after Alexander Elder.
