= Isaac Todhunter =

English mathematician (1820–1884)

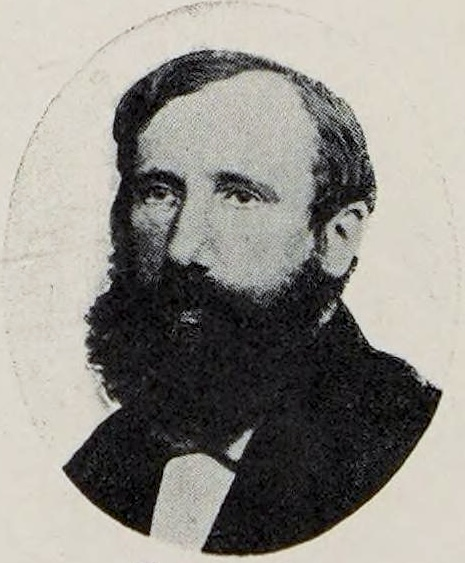
- Isaac Todhunter
- Born: 23 November 1820; Rye, Sussex, England
- Died: 1 March 1884 (aged 63); Cambridge, Cambridgeshire, England
- Education: University College, London; University of London; St John's College, Cambridge
- Awards: Smith's prize (1848); Adams prize (1871); Burney prize
- Scientific career
- Fields: Mathematics
- Academic advisors: William Hopkins

Isaac Todhunter FRS (23 November 1820 – 1 March 1884), was an English mathematician who is best known today for the books he wrote on mathematics and its history.

== Life and work ==
The son of George Todhunter, a Nonconformist minister, and Mary (née Hume), he was born at Rye, Sussex. He was educated at Hastings, where his mother had opened a school after the death of his father in 1826. He was at first at a school run by Robert Carr, moving then to one opened by John Baptist Austin.

Todhunter became an assistant master at a school at Peckham, attending at the same time evening classes at the University College, London where he was influenced by Augustus De Morgan. In 1842 he obtained a mathematical scholarship and graduated as B.A. at London University, where he was awarded the gold medal on the M.A. examination. About this time he became mathematical master at a school at Wimbledon.

In 1844 Todhunter entered St John's College, Cambridge, where he was senior wrangler in 1848, and gained the first Smith's Prize and the Burney Prize; and in 1849 he was elected to a fellowship, and began his life of college lecturer and private tutor. In 1862 he was made a fellow of the Royal Society, and in 1865 a member of the London Mathematical Society. In 1871 he gained the Adams Prize and was elected to the council of the Royal Society. He was elected honorary fellow of St John's in 1874, having resigned his fellowship on his marriage in 1864. In 1880 his eyesight began to fail, and shortly afterwards he was attacked with paralysis.

He is buried in the Mill Road cemetery, Cambridge.

== Personal life ==
Todhunter married 13 August 1864 Louisa Anna Maria, eldest daughter of Captain (afterwards Admiral) George Davies, R.N. (at that time head of the county constabulary force). He died on 1 March 1884, at his residence, 6 Brookside, Cambridge. A mural tablet and medallion portrait were placed in the ante-chapel of his college by his widow, who, with four sons and one daughter, survived him.

He was a sound Latin and Greek scholar, familiar with French, German, Spanish, Italian, and also Russian, Hebrew, and Sanskrit. He was well versed in the history of philosophy, and on three occasions acted as examiner for the moral sciences tripos.

== Selected writings ==
- 1852: Treatise on the Differential Calculus and the Elements of the Integral Calculus (6th ed., 1873)
- 1853: Treatise on Analytical Statics (4th ed., 1874)
- 1857: Treatise on the Integral Calculus (4th ed., 1874)
- 1858: Algebra (New ed., 1870)
- 1858: Examples of Analytical Geometry of Three Dimensions (3rd ed., 1873)
- 1858: Treatise on Plane Co-ordinate Geometry (4th ed., 1867)
- 1859: Plane Trigonometry (7th ed., 1878)
- 1859: Spherical Trigonometry, substantially revised by J. G. Leathem (1901)
- 1861: History of the Calculus of Variations (1861)
- 1861: Theory of Equations (1861, 2nd ed. 1875)
- 1863: Algebra for Beginners. (New ed., 1867)
- 1865: A History of the Mathematical Theory of Probability from the Time of Pascal to that of Laplace
- 1866: Trigonometry for Beginners
- 1867: Mechanics for Beginners
- 1871: Treatise on differential Calculus
- 1871: Researches in the Calculus of Variations
- 1873: The Conflict of Studies and Other Essays on Subjects Connected with Education
- 1873: History of the Mathematical Theories of Attraction and Figure of the Earth from Newton to Laplace
- 1875: Elementary Treatise on Laplace's, Lamé's and Bessel's Functions
- 1876: William Whewell, D.D., Master of Trinity College, Cambridge (Vol. 1, Vol. 2), republished 2011, doi:10.1017/cbo9781139105415
- 1877: Natural Philosophy for Beginners
- 1886: (with Karl Pearson) A history of the theory of elasticity and of the strength of materials from Galilei to the present time Vol II Pt I Vol II Pt II

Todhunter wrote textbooks on algebra and trigonometry, and a revision of the translation by Robert Simson of Euclid's Elements, which, with an introduction by Thomas Little Heath, was republished by Everyman in 1933.

Todhunter's major historical works include a history of the probability theory from the time of Blaise Pascal to that of Pierre-Simon Laplace first published in 1865.
