= Slave bell =

Bell used to regulate the day in slave societies

A slave bell is a bell that was rung to regulate the day on slave plantations and in slave societies. They were featured in slave plantations throughout the Americas and notably in the slavery systems in Cape Colony, present-day South Africa. The structures they were housed in, most often tall pillars and towers, became landmarks on the plantation and could be used to surveillance the enslaved workers. In some cases, these structures have become a symbolic feature of the architectural style of that region and the architecture of plantation slavery. In South Africa, the pillars of the slave bell is a distinctive feature of the Cape Dutch architectural style.

In a 1937 interview for WPA Slave Narrative project Charley Williams (b. 1843), who had lived and worked on a cotton and tobacco plantation in Louisiana where he was enslaved from birth (circa 1845) until 1865 with over 100 men, women and children, described the use of the bells and horns to control the lives and labour of the enslaved people: "... you can hear a old bell donging way on some plantation a mile or two off, and den more bells at other places and maybe a horn..." "Bells and horns! Bells for dis and horns for dat! All we knowed was go and come by de bells and horns!"

The slave bells were used by the enslaved to organise uprisings. In 1839 on Montalvo sugar plantation in the Matanzas Province, Cuba the plantation's slave bell at prayer time were used as a signal to attack the overseers and liberate themselves and others by fleeing into the woods.

== Bells used to torture and punish ==
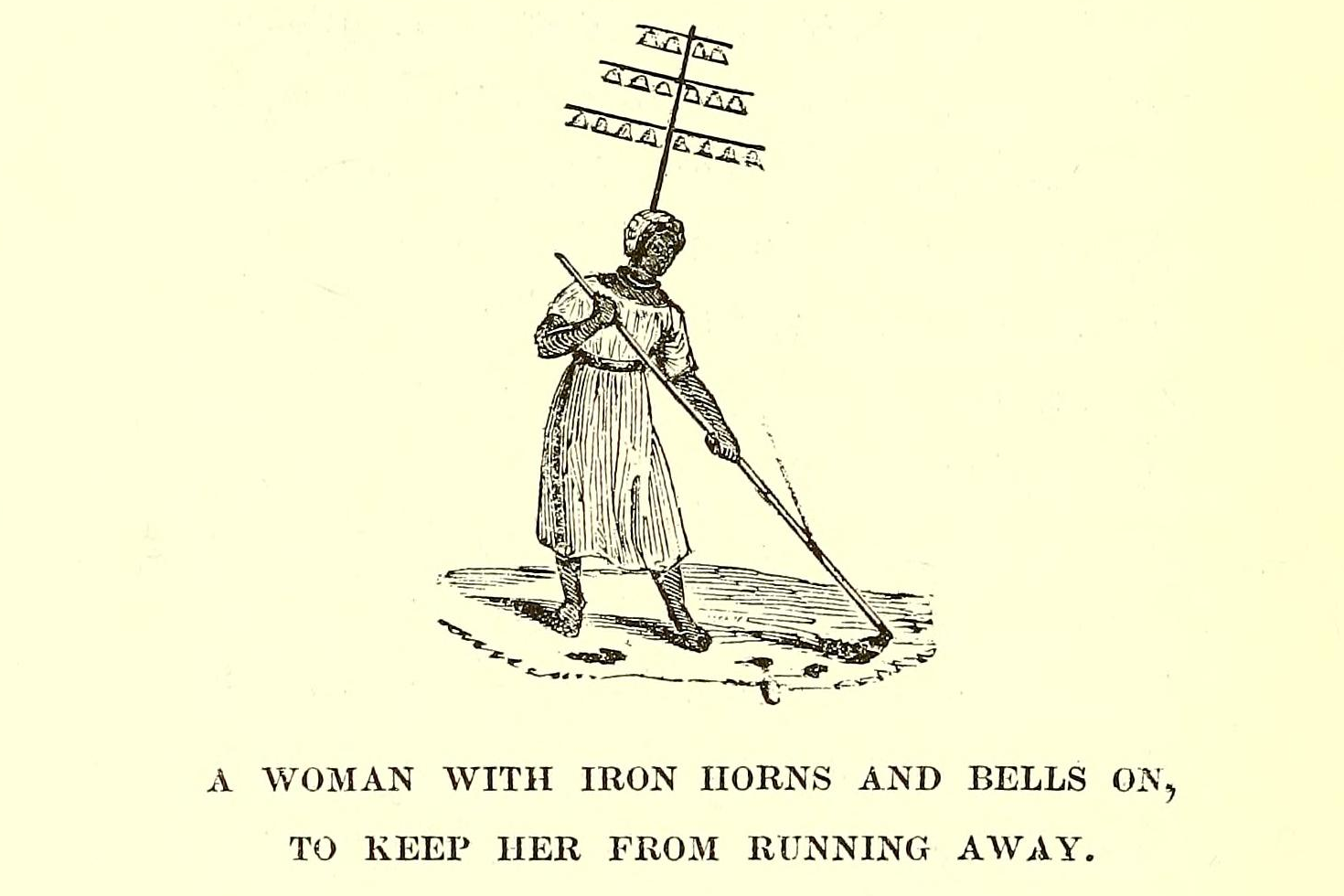
Illustration from A narrative of the adventures and escape of Moses Roper from American slavery by Moses Roper, 1839

Bells were also used as a punishment and to prevent people from escaping. In his book A Narrative of the Adventures and Escape of Moses Roper, from American Slavery Moses Roper described the use of "iron horns, with bells, attached to the back of the slave's neck" several feet in height as an "instrument of torture".

== Cape Colony ==
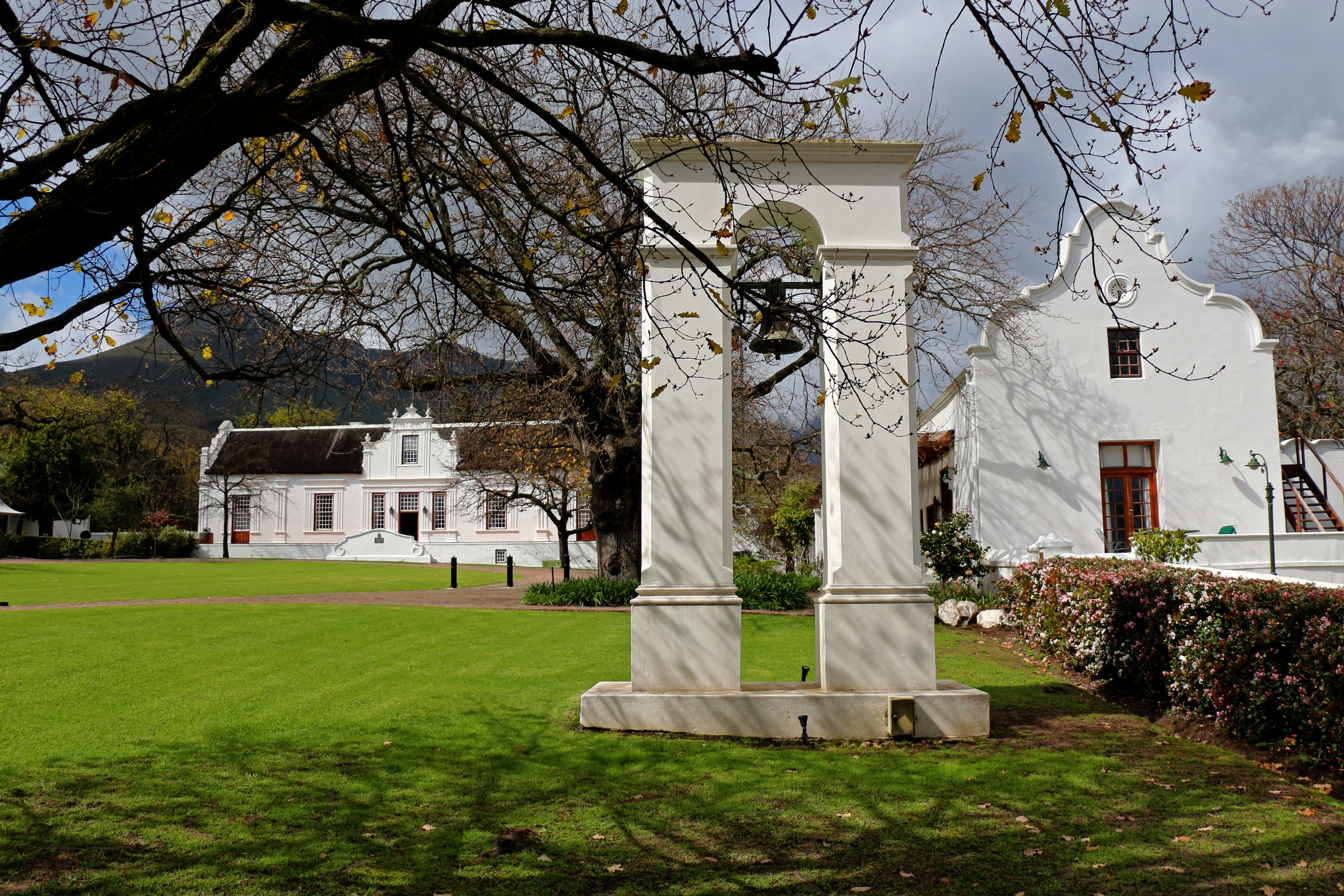
Slave bell and manor house at the Lanzerac estate in Stellenbosch, South Africa.

In the Dutch Cape Colony the slave bell had a distinctive architectural-style. It was usually a large bell hung from free-standing tall white pillars or in a white arch. After the abolition of slavery in the Cape they were continuously used during the apartheid regime in South Africa as an element of the Cape Dutch architectural style without recognition that they were symbols of oppression and suffering.

== Notable slave bells ==
=== La Demajagua bell, Cuba ===
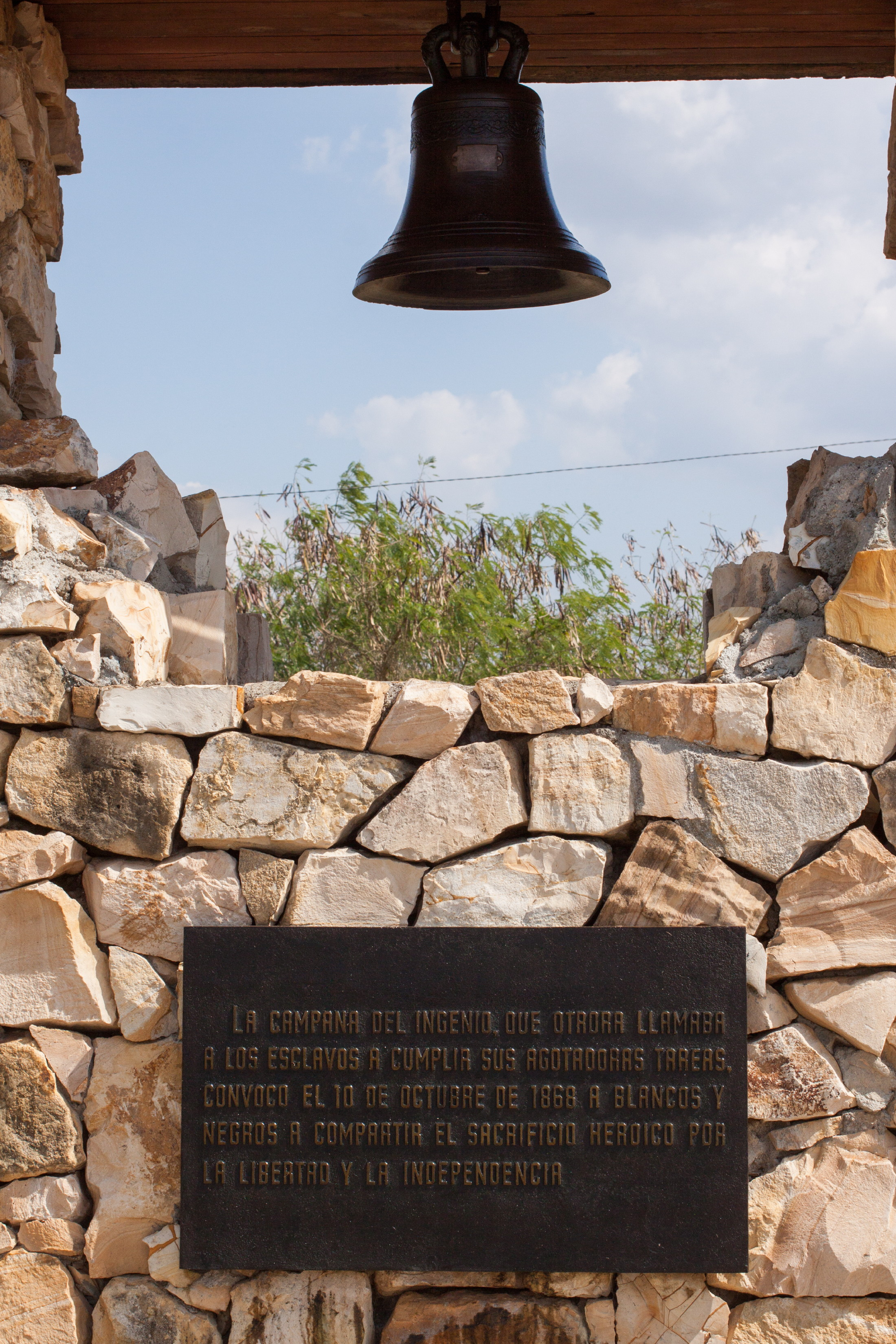
La Demajagua memorial, Manzanillo, Cuba.

In Cuba, on 10 October 1868, the slave bell at the La Demajagua sugar mill, in Manzanillo, was rung by the mill's owner Carlos Manuel de Céspedes to called assemble the people he enslaved to tell them that they are free and to invite them to join the fight for independence from Spain. This act is seen as the start of the Ten Years War.

In 1947 the Demajagua bell was brought to the University of Havana by law student Fidel Castro and other anti-government demonstrators. When the bell was removed by the government, Castro protested against it on national radio, making his name widely known in Cuba for the first time. The bell was returned to Manzanillo in November 1947 and was re-installed at La Demajagua in 1968.

=== The Demerara Bell ===
A bell, known as the Demerara Bell, was donated to St. Catharine's College, Cambridge in 1960 or 1961 by a former student Edward Arthur Goodland, who worked at Bookers Sugar Estates in British Guiana. The bell was inscribed ‘De Catharina 1772’ was from the Anna Catharina plantation on the West Bank Demerara, was found in the Demerara River in the 1950s. The bell initially installed outside the porter's lodge at St. Catharine's before it was moved to an accommodation block in 1994 where it was in a prominent position overlooking the centre of the college. In May 2019 the governing body and students of St Catharine’s College unanimously agreed that the bell should be removed view and would eventually be donated to Rijksmuseum, Amsterdam. In August 2019 it was reported that the Guyanese High Commissioner Frederick Hamley Case had persuaded the college to return the bell to Guyana.

=== Manaca Iznaga Tower, Cuba ===
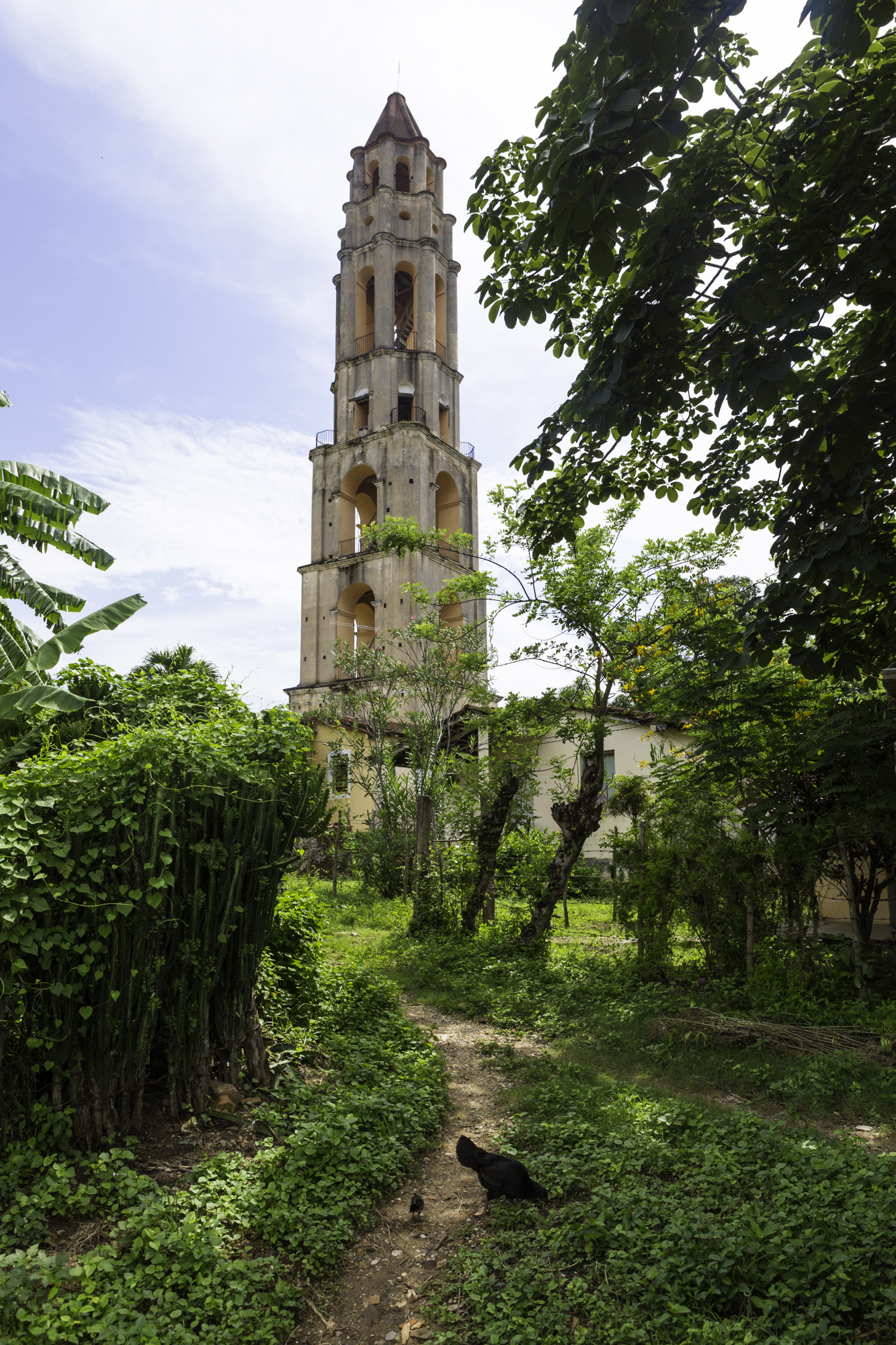
Iznaga Tower, Cuba

Iznaga Tower was the bell tower housing the slave bell of the Manaca sugar plantation in Valle de los Ingenios, in Trinidad, Cuba. It is an example of the bell towers that were a common feature on sugar plantations in Cuba, other notable examples are at Angerona and El Padre plantations located in present-day Cafetal del Padre in the Havana Province. Large Cuban plantations often had several bells that were rung to control the activities of the enslaved people including regulating prayer time, meal times and to warn other plantations of slave rebellions.

The 51m tower was built in 1848, it is constructed of stone and brick and has seven levels. In addition to housing the slave bells it was used as an observation tower from which the people enslaved on the plantation were surveilled.

In 1988, Valle de los Ingenios and neighbouring city Trinidad were declared a World Heritage Site by UNESCO.
