= Mark Allison =

Australian agricultural industry manager

- Born: Mark Charles Allison; 6 December 1960 (age 65); Ayr, Queensland, Australia
- Education: University of Queensland, Central Queensland University, Harvard Business School
- Occupations: Chair and Director
- Website: mallison.co

Mark Allison (born 6 December 1960 in Ayr, Queensland) is an Australian agricultural industry manager. He is a former chief executive officer and managing director of Elders Limited and holds several other positions at the industry organizations.

== Early life ==
Mark Allison was born on 6 December 1960 in Ayr, Queensland in a sugarcane and beef cattle family. He was raised in Townsville. Allison attended Bracken Ridge State High School and was elected School Captain in 1977.

== Education ==
Allison completed an Agriculture Science Degree (1982) and Bachelor of Economics (1986) at the University of Queensland followed by a Graduate Diploma of Management at Central Queensland University (1989). Allison also completed an Advanced Management Program at Harvard Business School in 2012. On 19 September 2023, he was awarded an Honorary Doctorate from the University of Adelaide for his lifelong contribution to Australian agriculture and broader agribusiness.

== Business career ==
Allison started professional life as a research agronomist in Moree working with irrigated cotton and dryland broadacre crops. He specialised in crop protection and nutrition in this role and moved to Toowoomba where he pioneered the rainfastness methodology for ammonium sulphate use with glyphosate to reduce the rainfastness period and incompatibility problems for tank mixes with glyphosate. Monsanto acknowledged this work with an “Outstanding Achievement” presented to Allison in 1987.

Following a number of executive roles with crop protection, animal health and fertiliser companies, Allison was appointed to the role of General Manager of Fertiliser of Incitec in 1996 and became a Managing Director of CropCare Australasia in 1997.

In April 2001, Allison joined Wesfarmers as the Deputy Managing Director of Wesfarmers CSBP and was appointed Managing Director of CSBP in August 2001. In July 2002, he was appointed a Managing Director of Wesfarmers Landmark. After completing the sale of Wesfarmers Landmark to AWB Limited in 2003, Allison left the business and founded an Agricultural Business Consultancy business called Gouldian Management Services.

In December 2003, he joined Makhteshim-Agan and in 2004 completed a project to provide globally leading generic crop protection company Makteshim Agan an entry platform into the Australian and New Zealand market. It resulted with the acquisition of Farmoz in Australia and the greenfield entry with Agronica into the New Zealand market. Allison completed this acquisition and entry and was appointed Managing Director and CEO of the newly formed Makteshim Agan Australasia.

In May 2007, he took the position of a CEO of the Jeminex Group, a provider of industrial components. As the managing director of Jeminex Group, Allison initiated several acquisitions, aiming to build a diversified industrial group and bring the company to market.

Allison became a director of the Elders Limited in 2009. In September 2010, he was appointed Chief Executive Officer of GrainGrowers, a national grain producer organisation, and for some time served in both roles.

In June 2013, Allison was appointed a chairman of the Elders. In April 2014, following the election of a new chairman, he was appointed a managing director of the Elders. He consequently stepped down from the position of GrainGrowers's CEO, but remained in board as a non-executive director.

In November 2022, Allison announced that he would be retiring from his role as CEO and MD of Elders Limited in November 2023, after ten years as Chair, Executive Chair and CEO. This decision was reversed in June 2023, when the Elders Limited Board announced that Allison would remain in his role of MD and CEO on an ongoing basis.

He stepped down from his role of Managing Director and CEO of Elders Limited in September 2026, and has resumed his non executive career in Chair and Director roles.

=== Government bodies ===
In 2000, Allison was appointed a board member of the National Registration Authority for Agricultural and Veterinary Chemicals (currently Australian Pesticides and Veterinary Medicines Authority, APVMA). From 2007 to 2012, Allison served as the Chair of the APVMA Advisory Board.

== Industry organizations ==
Throughout his career Allison has played an active role in the industry, becoming a director of Avcare (the Crop Protection and Animal Health representative body) in 1997, and chair in 1999. Allison remained chair until 2006, when it was transformed into a pure crop protection body as CropLife Australia. Allison was appointed a director and chair of CropLife as part of the transition from Avcare, stepping down as chair in 2007. He was appointed a Life Member of CropLife at this time.

In 1997, Allison was appointed as a director and chair of Agsafe, serving in this role until he stood down in 2007.

In 2009, Allison became the CEO of BRI Australia, a subsidiary of an influential grain industry organisation Grain Growers Limited (GrainGrowers). In 2010 he was appointed GrainGrowers CEO, stepping down in 2014.

In 2012, Allison was appointed a director of Grain Technology Australia, a not-for-profit, registered charity representing the grain, flour milling, baking and allied industries of Australia. He served as a director until 2023.

In 2015, Allison was elected chair of Agribusiness Australia, serving in the role until stepping down in 2023.

== Music ==
Allison is a self taught guitarist and singer songwriter, recording under the name of “mallison”. He has composed 184 original songs, and has recorded 13 albums. Allison writes in multiple genres including, folk, country, rock, reggae, rap, electronic and Latin styles.
