= John Campbell (19th-century minister) =

Scottish Congregationalist minister

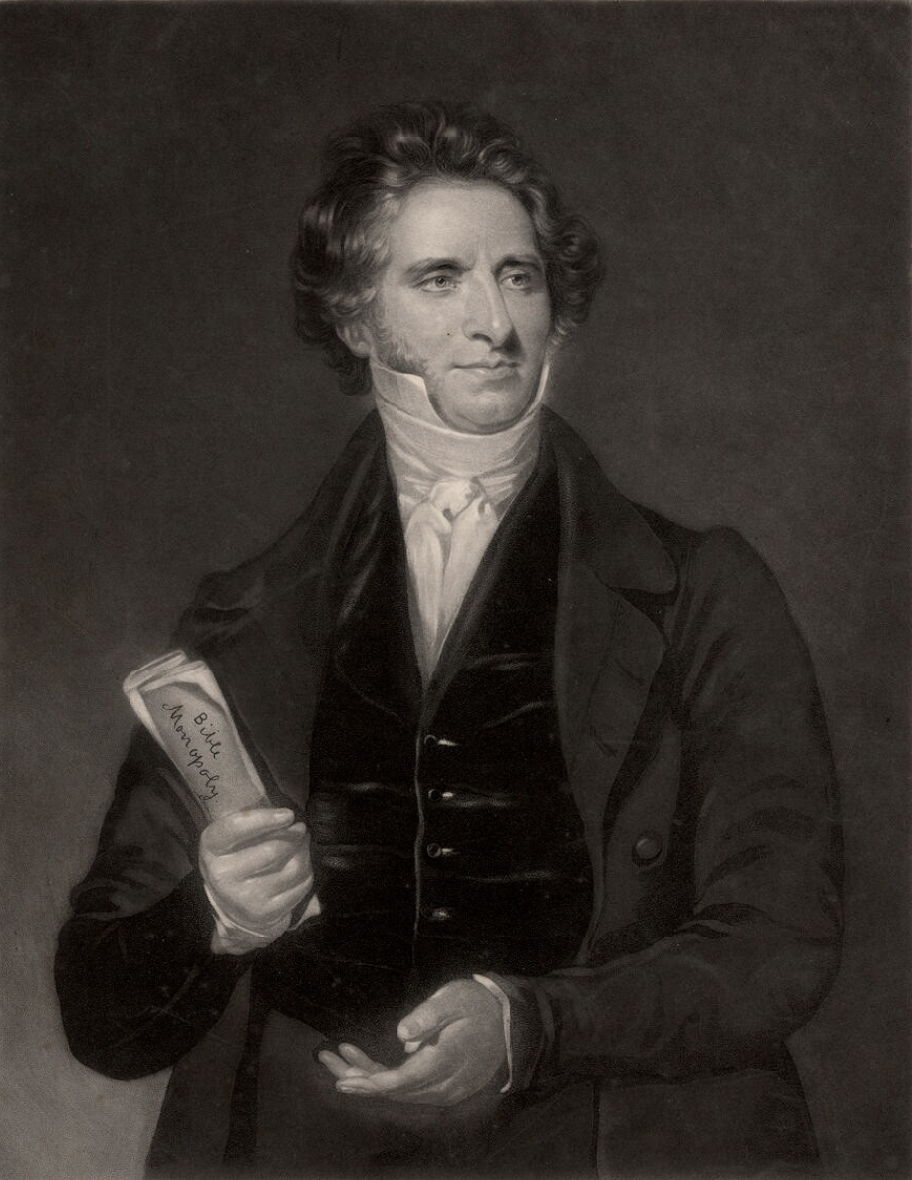
John Campbell, mid-century engraving

John Campbell (1795 – 1867) was a Scottish Congregationalist minister at the Moorfields Tabernacle in London. He was the second successor there of George Whitefield, the Calvinistic Methodist. He founded and edited religious magazines and journals, including the Christian Witness and the British Banner.

== Early life ==
He was born at Kirriemuir in Forfarshire, the son of Alexander Campbell, a surgeon. He went to sea, then was a blacksmith in Dundee. After an evangelical conversion in 1817, he attended the University of St Andrews and then the University of Glasgow.

In 1823 Campbell was preaching in Kilmarnock, and set up a church there. He was ordained in 1827 by Ralph Wardlaw, and Greville Ewing of the Congregational Union of Scotland. In 1828 he was preacher for six weeks at Hoxton Academy's Chapel, attracting attention. In 1829 he was nominated as his successor at the Moorfields Tabernacle in London, by Matthew Wilks who died later that year.

== Bible monopoly ==
Campbell became well known for his campaign to bring down the price of the Bible (Authorized Version).

From around 1830 the position of King's Printer for England, with a qualified monopoly in England to print the Authorised Version, was held by Andrew Spottiswoode, who initially was also a Member of Parliament. In 1839, with Queen Victoria now on the throne, the Queen's Printer for Scotland was not given a renewed patent granting the monopoly, which was instead passed on to a Board for Bible Circulation. The Board was chaired by the Rev. Adam Thomson.

Thomson was a minister at Coldstream, supported in extended campaigning against the monopoly by Joseph Hume and John Filby Childs the Bungay printer. He started a new campaign to have the corresponding monopoly in England removed, and the British and Foreign Bible Society was attacked. Campbell was his ally, on the issue of making Bibles cheaper; after a brief period of criticism directed at supporters of the English monopoly, he desisted. The monopoly stayed in place, but the price of Bibles did come down.

== Speech for Frederick Douglass ==
In May 1846 Campbell agreed to support the London Reception Speech for Frederick Douglass, the escaped enslaved American, held at Finsbury Chapel by Alexander Fletcher. Called on to provide the "Reply", he said:

Frederick Douglass, the 'beast of burden', 'the portion of goods and chattels', the representative of three millions of men, has been raised up! Shall I say the man? If there is a man on earth, he is a man. My blood boiled within me when I heard his address tonight, and thought that he had left behind him three millions of such men. We must see more of this man; we must have more of this man.

== Congregationalist press baron ==
The term "press baron" has been used of the portfolio of publications and roles Campbell took on in the Congregationalist press, built up over a period of about 15 years. He contributed to The Patriot. He came to own it, with Josiah Pratt who died in 1844. That year the Congregational Union of England and Wales asked him to edit the Christian Witness, a monthly. The following year he took on also the editorship of the Christian's Penny Magazine.

In 1848, Thomas Challis, one of the trustees of The Patriot, asked Campbell to edit the weekly British Banner. The Cambridge History of the Book in Britain comments on the power of the press during the 1850s, and "spiritual clout", and the relationship to "denominations with central institutions". It uses Campbell, whose major publications then all had circulations of the order of 100,000, as an example, with his "triggering of feuds over alleged 'German error' in Congregational pulpits and colleges."

== Rivulet controversy and aftermath ==
Campbell made a divisive attack on Thomas Toke Lynch, a hymn writer, in the mid-1850s: it cost him the support of the Congregational Union for the Christian Witness and the Christian's Penny Magazine.

While The Record of Alexander Haldane saw Campbell as a staunch traditionalist, the point at issue was that many other Congregationalists responded strongly to Romantic poetry. William Garrett Horder, writing in A Dictionary of Hymnology, described the resulting furore as "one of the most bitter hymnological controversies known in the annals of modern Congregationalism". James Grant in the Morning Advertiser attacked Lynch's hymn collection The Rivulet, as doctrinally null; and Campbell followed up in the British Banner, calling it "the most unspiritual publication of the kind in the English language."

Edward Miall had differed with Campbell (the "Author of Jethro" of The Patriot) over his British Anti-State Church Association in the early 1840s, and on Christian mission with his The British Churches in Relation to the British People (1849), and came out in due course for Lynch and the liberals. Thomas Binney, seeing the Congregational Union deeply split, intervened as a peacemaker, at cost to his health. James Baldwin Brown published The Way of Peace for the Congregational Union (1857), and found his liberal theology led him subsequently out of Calvinism. Campbell's broader denunciation of "Germanism" saw in 1856–7 Samuel Davidson lose his position at Lancashire Independent College, over a new edition of Thomas Hartwell Horne's standard work on biblical criticism, in the face of hostility from Campbell and Recordites.

There was in 1856 a disagreement between Campbell and the trustees of The Patriot. Shortly afterwards Thomas Charles Turberville (died 1871) was brought to London from Birmingham to edit The Patriot, British Banner and the English Independent. He was afflicted by a paralytic attack around 1857.

The outcome of the Rivulet controversy has been described as "a firm rebuff for Campbell's attempt to set himself up as a watchdog for Germanism." He started the British Standard after the break with Challis, and edited it for a decade until he retired.

== Death and memorial ==
Campbell died at home in St John's Wood Park, on 26 March 1867. He is buried at Abney Park Cemetery, Stoke Newington. Life and Labours of John Campbell, D.D. by Robert Ferguson and Andrew Morton Brown appeared that year.

== Works ==
- Jethro: a system of lay agency, in connexion with Congregational Churches, for the diffusion of the Gospel among our home population (1839), anonymous. The source of the pseudonym "author of Jethro" subsequently used by Campbell as author and journalist. It contributed to the discussion on the printing monopoly for Bibles.

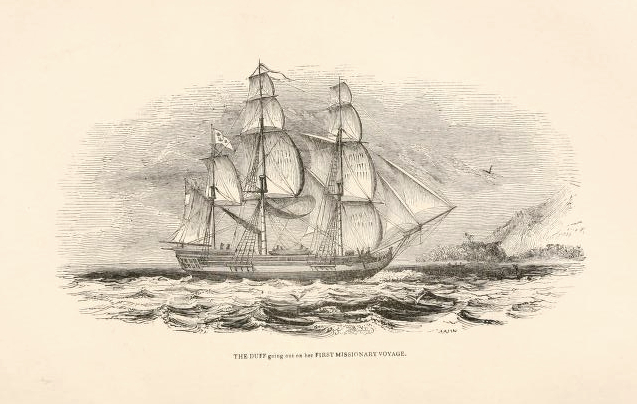
The Duff missionary vessel, engraving from Maritime Discovery and Christian Missions by John Campbell

- Maritime Discovery and Christian Missions: Considered in Their Mutual Relations (1840)
- The present state of the Bible question considered, a letter (1841), by "the author of Jethro"
- The Martyr of Erromanga: Or, The Philosophy of Missions, Illustrated from the Labours, Death, and Character of the Late Rev. John Williams (1842). On the death in 1839 of the Pacific missionary John Williams.
- Memoirs of David Nasmith: His Labours and Travels in Great Britain, France, the United States, and Canada (1844)
- Nonconformist Theology; or Serious considerations for churches, pastors, and deacons: being seven letters to the Principals and Professors of the Independent and Baptist Colleges of England (1856)
- John Angell James: a review of his history, character, eloquence, and literary labours (1860)

== Family ==
Campbell was twice married, firstly in 1827 to Agnes Crichton (died 1857) from Irvine: they had three daughters and four sons. At the end of his life, in 1866, he married Emma Anna Fontaine née Bacon, widow of William Fontaine of Hoxton.
