= Moses Roper =

American abolitionist and writer

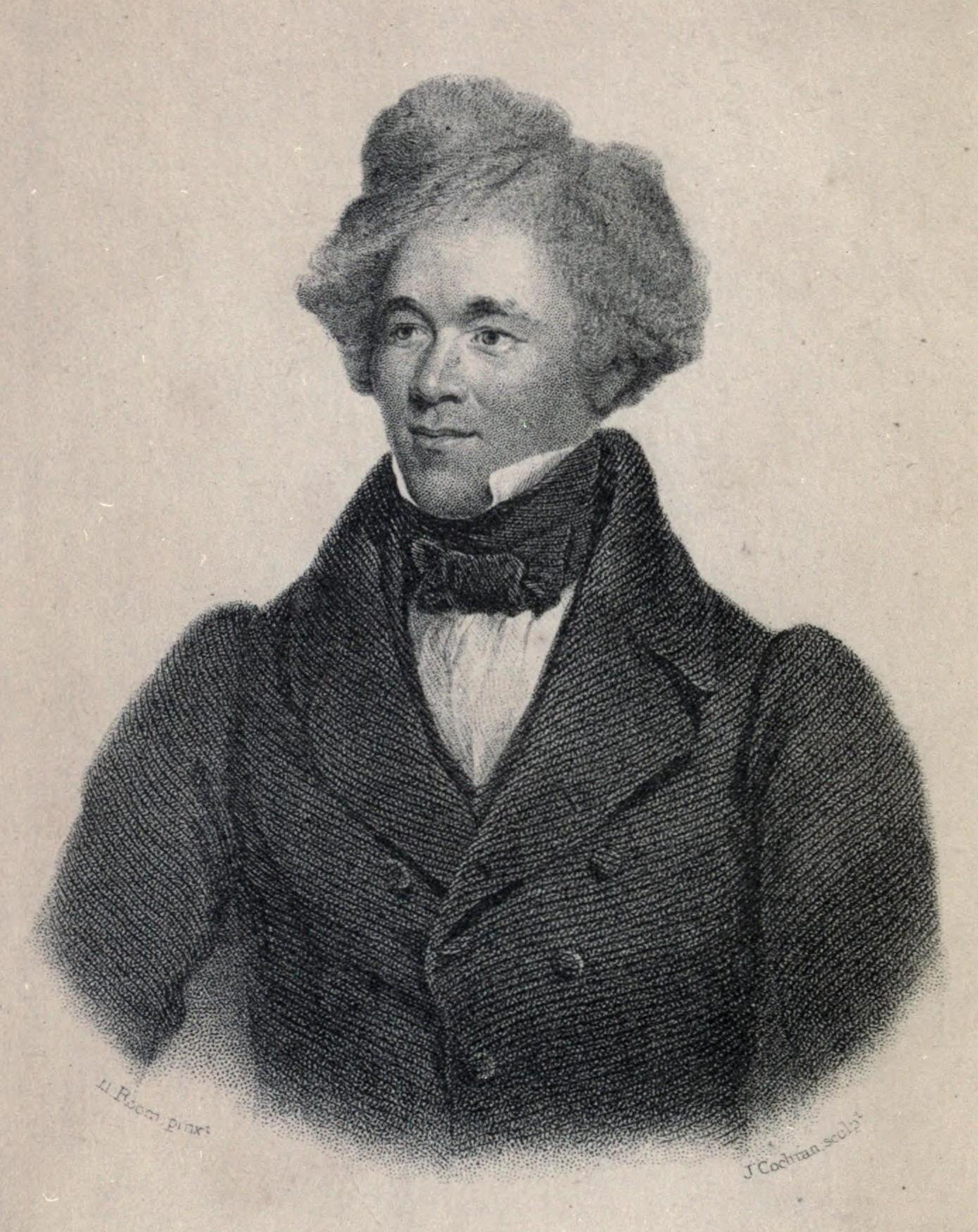
- Born: c. 1815; Caswell County, North Carolina
- Died: April 18, 1891; Boston, Massachusetts
- Education: Hackney, University College London
- Occupations: Writer, lecturer
- Known for: abolitionist author and activist
- Spouse: Ann Stephen Price
- Children: 4 daughters
- Parent(s): Nancy, a slave, and Henry Roper, a white planter and master
- Relatives: brothers and sisters

Moses Roper (c. 1815 – April 15, 1891) was an African American who is best known as an abolitionist, author and orator active in Great Britain and Ireland from the mid-1830s through the 1840s and 1850s. His memoir, known as a slave narrative, had numerous editions and sold nearly 40,000 copies, including 5,000 in Welsh.

He had escaped from slavery in Florida in 1834, went North, and migrated overseas the next year. He had gained introductions to abolitionists in England, and became educated. He wrote an influential memoir, Narrative of the Adventures and Escape of Moses Roper from American Slavery. First published in 1837, it was unique in England for being written by an American fugitive slave. Roper revised the book numerous times in further editions through 1848. He added extensive appendices and documentation to support his account.

As an activist, Roper gave thousands of lectures in Great Britain and Ireland, speaking from firsthand experience about the brutality of American slavery.

He later migrated with his family to Canada, where his three younger daughters were born. After living there for several years, the family returned to England before 1861. Roper returned alone to the US and toured as a lecturer. Later in life, he worked as a laborer. He died in 1891 in Boston.

== Early life ==
Roper was born into slavery around 1815 in Caswell County, North Carolina. His father Henry Roper was a white planter and his mother's enslaver. Nancy was of African American and indigenous descent. (In his memoir, Roper said that his father's wife tried to kill him as an infant, furious that her husband had sired a mixed-race baby. Nancy's mother protected him. Henry Roper was forced to transfer Nancy and her baby to a relative distant from the Roper plantation.)

When Moses was seven years old, he was sold apart from his mother. He did not see her for several years. Roper later wrote that because he was light-skinned and strongly resembled his father, some slaveholders did not want to buy him, as he looked "too white." Roper was sold numerous times in North Carolina and Florida, and he persisted in trying to escape. He was always severely punished after being caught. Roper later wrote that he had tried to escape between 16 and 20 times.

== Escape to freedom ==
While held in Florida, Roper escaped in 1834 and gradually made his way North. He described his resourcefulness in evading recapture in Georgia: he encountered a group of farmers who wrote a free pass for him after he was being challenged.

I pretended to show her my passport, feeling for it everywhere about my coat and hat, and not finding it, I went back a little way, pretending to look for it, but came back, saying, I was very sorry, but I did not know where it was ... [the farmers offered to help and their] lad sat down and wrote what I told him, nearly filling a large sheet of paper for the passport, and another with recommendations.

Roper eventually reached New York. He moved to Massachusetts and Vermont for short periods of time as he feared being taken by slave catchers who were active in the region. Roper could pass as white and some associates urged him to join the U.S. Army to evade unwanted attention.

But, with the help of American abolitionists, Roper boarded a ship for Great Britain, armed with introductions to abolitionists, and settled in London in 1835.

After studying to gain literacy, he wrote a memoir, Narrative of the Adventures and Escape of Moses Roper from American Slavery (1837), an influential account of the horrors he had survived. His mentors helped sponsor publication, and in ensuing revised editions, Roper sold thousands of books. He recounted both his own experiences and his firsthand witness of American slavery and its abuses. Up until then, white British abolitionists had largely described slavery.

According to 21st century scholar Martha J. Cutter, the 1838 edition, which contained five illustrations, is one of the first illustrated slave narratives to be published by an enslaved African American. (He lived as a fugitive slave.) Cutter says that Roper's narrative "depicts forms of agency and subjectivity that move beyond the master's system of representation," layering "patterns of Christian symbolism that invoke martyrdom and even crucifixion onto and over a resistant and active enslaved body." The text thus "performs a mode of Christian salvation that involves putting one's fate in the hands of God but one's feet in the position of running (away from, or out of, slavery)." The text's illustrations "refigure formations of enslaved abasement common in abolitionist discourse through a type of liberation theology."

In the book, Roper recounts the example of brutality of a master, Mr. Gooch, and his sons. Gooch had Roper stripped naked and tied to a high rail. In total, his two sons and son-in-law, and Gooch flogged the slave 200 times. Roper wrote:

This may appear incredible, but the marks which they left at present remain on my body, a standing testimony to the truth of this statement of his severity.

In his lectures in Great Britain and Ireland, Roper recounted such events and displayed whips, chains, and manacles typically used in American slavery. At a meeting in Sheffield in April 1838, he reportedly exhibited a device nicknamed a “negro flapper,” used to beat field slaves.

== Activism in Britain and Ireland ==
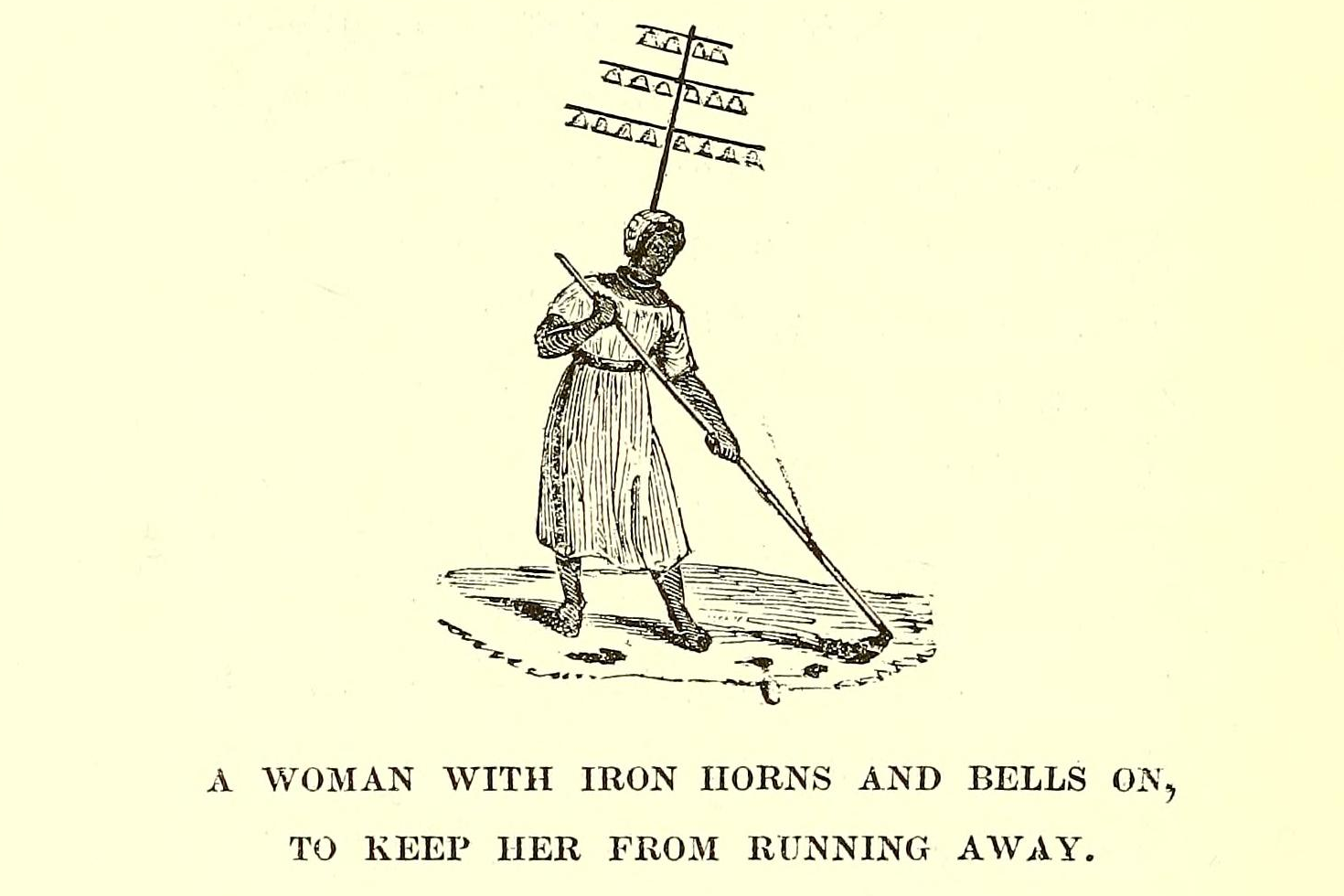
An 1839 illustration of an enslaved African-American woman forced to wear slave bells to prevent her escape.

Roper's associates in Boston prepared for his patronage in England; he carried letters of introduction to Rev. Dr. Fletcher, Rev. Dr. Morison and Rev. Dr. Raffles. Through them he met other sympathetic patrons, notably Rev. Dr. T. Price and Rev. F. Cox, and leading British abolitionists such as Thomas Fowell Buxton. Denied the chance to learn to read and write while enslaved in the United States, Roper took the opportunity to learn how to do so in Hackney and Wallingford in Oxfordshire. He was admitted to the University of London.

At Hackney I remained half a year, going through the rudiments of an English education. At this time I attended the ministry of Dr Cox, which I enjoyed very much ... never, I trust, will be efaced from my memory, the parental care of the Rev. Dr Morison, from whom I can say, I received the greatest kindness.

Great Britain had ended slavery in its colonies in the Caribbean and activists turned their attention to the US. Roper's patrons helped him organize a lecture tour in the country's chapels to spread knowledge of American slavery. They also subscribed to gain printing of his autobiography in 1837 and helped promote it.

Roper toured throughout England, Ireland, Scotland and Wales, making the case for the abolition of slavery in the U.S.

In London, he made two early speeches in May 1836. The first was at the Rev. Thomas Price's Baptist Chapel, Devonshire Square, and the second at the independent Finsbury Chapel of Rev. Alexander Fletcher. Each attracted large crowds and were extensively reported, influencing British views on American slavery.

One newspaper reported on Roper's speech after a meeting in Bradford in 1840:

He exhibited and described some implements of corporal punishment, used by the planters of the United States and their merciless overseers, and gave a melancholy detail of the sufferings to which the slaves are exposed, and the degraded condition to which the system of slavery has reduced the white population of the Southern States of America…Mr. Roper, in the course of his description of the eventful fortunes of his attempts to escape, roused the liveliest sympathy in the breasts of his hearers, and recited several soul-stirring strains of Montgomery's (of Sheffield) poetry. He lamented in a feeling manner the fate of his mother, whom he had wished to redeem from slavery, but who is now dead. He enlarged on the desolate condition of his brothers and sisters who have been sold to remote states, and from whom he has had no intelligence of late. He stated that he still loved America, that he suffered much from the English climate, yet to be reckoned a British citizen had been his ardent desire, but that legal naturalization was above his pecuniary means.

Throughout his tour, Roper challenged conventional white perspectives on American slavery. During one speech in Leicester in 1838, he declared: "'Many will say 'This is the slaves’ side of the question. The slave-holders would tell a different story.' You have heard the slave-holders’ story 250 years ago. Now, I think it is time for the slaves to speak."

By 1848, his slave narrative had sold more than 38,000 copies, including more than 5,000 in the Welsh language. He lectured over 2,000 times across Britain and Ireland in Baptist, Independent, Methodist, and Quaker churches and town halls in nearly every county in Britain. He was one of the few activists to lecture in the Scottish Highlands. The sheer extent of Roper's lecturing tour is astounding, as it included travels to rural communities in Cornwall and Wales. The references have a map of his speaking locations.

Although Roper received much praise during his lecture tours, his relations with some of his abolitionist associates became strained. In Roper's 1838 edition of his narrative, the Rev. Thomas Price had written a testimonial of “unequivocal witness to [Roper's] sobriety, intelligence, and honesty.” Price said his “great ambition is to be qualified for usefulness amongst his own people; and the progress he has already made justifies the belief that if the means of education can be secured for a short time longer, he will be eminently qualified to instruct the children of Africa in the truths of the gospel of Christ.” Price envisioned Roper serving as a missionary to the freed slaves in the West Indies.

But, two years later, Price openly criticized Roper for a “desultory and mendicant life.” His incessant “begging” was contrary to his “original and professed design of becoming a missionary”, and Price demanded that Roper remove his testimonial from the narrative. The debate raged on the pages of The Patriot newspaper in late 1840. Price charged Roper with reneging on previous promises to become a missionary. Later editions of Roper's narrative omitted Price's testimonial.

Roper also faced charges of falsehood during his lectures, by some who refused to believe his accounts of the harsh abuses of American slavery. In 1836, Roper wrote to a local newspaper that a Reverend R. J. Breckinridge questioned “the accuracy of a statement made by me in reference to the burning alive of a slave in the United States.” Roper assured both Breckinridge and the newspaper editor that the account was true.

He related the “particulars of that melancholy event.” An enslaved man named George was chained to a tree, “the chain having been passed round his neck, arms, and legs, to make him secure.” A large amount “of tar and turpentine was then poured over his head […] and the miserable man perished in the flames.” Long after the lynching and as a warning to the local enslaved population, “not only was the stump of the tree to which the slave George had been fastened to be seen, but some of his burnt bones.”

Roper wrote that he was “ready to attest in the most solemn” manner if necessary, and he stated that “though I have been a slave, I trust my evidence will be received on matters of fact which have come within the range of my own observation.” This would not be the last time that Roper was challenged; the press frequently questioned the veracity of his statements. Despite this, Roper refused to compromise on his graphic descriptions of the violence suffered by the enslaved and always resolved to "tell the truth" about his experiences.

Roper preferred to lecture on his own. One reporter noted that, in contrast to British abolitionist practice, Roper "commenced by stating why he did not like having a chairman to preside at meetings at which he spoke. He came from America, which was a land of independence, and he wished to be independent, and avoid the risk of offending any body, which he perhaps might do by some of his observations. Sometimes he had found the chairman not disposed to go the full length with him in his views, and that threw a damp upon the proceedings. He then introduced himself as Moses Roper."

== Family and life in Canada ==
Roper married Ann Stephen Price in Bristol, England, on December 21, 1839. They had four daughters together: one born on board ship in the Atlantic on the way to Canada in about 1844, two born in Quebec, and the youngest born in Nova Scotia between 1850 and 1857. He thrice returned to the United Kingdom: first in 1846 to "settle private matters" (possibly to arrange a new edition of his Narrative); then in 1854 and sometime before 1861, to lecture.

The final time, he brought his wife and daughters back with him. In the 1861 British Census, they were living with Ann's father, William Price, in Merthyr Tydfil, Glamorgan, Wales. Roper was residing in Cambridge, England, in a boarding house.

== Late years in the US ==
Some time after 1861, Moses Roper returned alone to the U.S., where he became an itinerant lecturer. He traveled around the country to lecture on various subjects, including "Africa and the African People", "Causes of the Colors of the Races", and the "Holy Land".

He and his wife had apparently fully separated. By 1871, Ann had remarried. When their youngest daughter, Alice Mary Maud Roper, married the Palestinian missionary Youhannah El-Karey at Risca in 1883, Roper's name as father was annotated on the marriage license as "(deceased)."

For some years before his death, Roper wandered through New England taking whatever employment he could find. He was working as a field hand on the farm of James T. Skillings in Franklin County, Maine, near the town of Strong when "his strength gave out" in April 1891. Roper, in very poor physical condition with little more than a hundred dollars in his pocket and accompanied by a dog named Pete (described as "his faithful companion"), was placed on a train to Boston, Massachusetts.

Roper and his dog made it to Boston, but he was found unconscious in a railroad station and taken to the Boston City Hospital. It was noted that he was "well protected from the cold, wearing four shirts, two overcoats and three pair of pantaloons" and he was suffering from "a complication of diseases of the heart and kidneys and also from eczema", which led to his death on April 15, 1891. His dog had to be dragged away from his bedside.

Roper was buried in a pauper's grave in Boston. His obituaries in major Boston and New York newspapers noted the importance of his abolitionist work in both the U.S and Europe.

== See also ==
- Slave narrative
