= Alexander Fletcher (minister) =

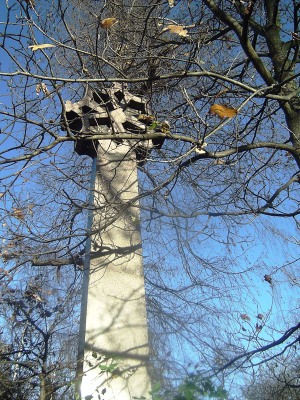
Memorial to Fletcher erected by his congregation at Abney Park Cemetery, London

Alexander Fletcher (1787–1860), the Children's Friend, was a Scottish kirk minister, and later an Independent (Congregational) divine in England. Author of numerous devotional works, and founder of the Finsbury Chapel in London, he was widely acknowledged as the pioneer of preaching to audiences of children and attracting large crowds of young people to nonconformist chapels through specially designed events and services as well as through Sunday schools.

He is also noted for his support of missionary work, and for the abolition of slavery in the United States.

== Early life ==
Fletcher was educated at the Grammar School at Stirling, then at Glasgow University where he graduated M.A. He was a student at the Divinity Hall under George Lawson at Selkirk, from 1802. In 1806 was licensed by the Presbytery of the Associate Synod.

Fletcher was called by his local church in Bridge of Teith, on the banks of the River Teith, to be his father's colleague and successor. He was ordained as co-pastor in 1807 and soon became renowned as the favourite preacher of children on either side of the Tweed. He was able to attract multitudes of young people.

In November 1811, Fletcher was sent to supply a Presbyterian meeting house in the City of London, and duly became pastor to its largely Scottish congregation. Still popular in his native Scotland, he was invited to preach there, notably in Glasgow where his reputation sometimes attracted such large audiences that tickets were required.

In London, he was also much sought after to preach at various places, by special invitation. The Surrey Chapel on Blackfriars Road was the first in London to ask him to preach to an audience of children as he had done in Scotland. Its pastor Rowland Hill invited Fletcher to speak soon after his arrival in London.

== Founding an independent chapel ==
Fletcher went to London when he was selected pastor in the City of London at the Presbyterian 'Miles Lane Meeting House'. His presence attracted a large congregation, and larger premises were needed. The congregation laid the foundation stone of the Albion Chapel in Moorfields in 1815 and relocated there the following year. Following a celebrated legal case, Fletcher moved on, with many of his supporters, to found his own Chapel nearby - the Finsbury Chapel. This was opened in 1825, and stood at the east end of Finsbury Circus on the corner of Blomfield Street and East Street. He continued at the Finsbury Chapel as its Independent Minister (Congregational), for the rest of his life where he was then succeeded by Alexander McAuslane.

Alexander Fletcher's move to the Albion Chapel and founding of Finsbury Chapel, followed his displacement by the Presbytery. In April 1824, he was prosecuted in the civil and ecclesiastical courts for breach of promise to marry Miss Eliza Dick. The Dictionary of National Biography explains that "In the King's Bench no verdict was given, but in the meeting of the United Associate Synod at Edinburgh, he was suspended from the exercise of his office and from church fellowship." In the early nineteenth century the expectations of men and women in society was slowly evolving and changing. Fletcher's trial led to considerable public interest about the issues involved and need for reform. It also attracted a famous literary satire: The Trial of the Reverend Alexander Fletcher, A.M. before the Lord Chief Justice of the Court of Common Sense, and a Special Jury, published in 1825. To amuse the reader, the satire packed its 'jury' with many well-known Scotsmen of the day, all of whom were given opinions on the matter. For example, Sir Walter Scott was given the part of Foreman of the jury.

== Poverty and prison reform ==
Alexander Fletcher was noted for his good works as well as his Christian teachings. When he visited the Scottish island of Skye, the poverty made a deep impression on him. On his return to London he founded a society to give generous support to the Islanders, including to 'The Skye-boat Scheme'. Fletcher was a direct patron as well, and the society was still operating when he died. He was a frequent visitor to prisons, including to Newgate prison in London, where Elizabeth Fry achieved much to improve conditions.

Apart from his work with children, Fletcher devoted the most energy to the non-denominational missionary society, which became the London Missionary Society (LMS). He was named Director of the society, whose London office stood in Blomfield Street, opposite the chapel which Fletcher founded.

== Missionary and abolition work ==
There were close links between the nonconformist Baptist Missionary Society and the nondenominational but predominantly nonconformist LMS. Fletcher assisted both organisations in their work. The 'Valedictory Meeting to Mr Knibb', a Baptist missionary and abolitionist was held in Finsbury Chapel on Tuesday 1 July 1845, attended by members of both organisations.

When Moses Roper escaped enslavement in the American South, and successfully made passage to England, he brought with him letters of introduction to three nonconformist ministers: Alexander Fletcher, John Morison, and a minister in Liverpool. Morison, Price, Cox and Fletcher became his patrons in Hackney and the London area. In his autobiography, Roper described these friends who assisted him whilst in England. Roper's anti-slavery speech of 26 May 1836, delivered at Fletcher's Finsbury Chapel, was one of his two most influential in the capital.

In May 1846 Finsbury Chapel was the venue for a huge gathering to hear a speech by Frederick Douglass, who had escaped from slavery in the US and become a major speaker for abolition. This was advertised as a publicity meeting at Finsbury Chapel to receive from Frederick Douglass an account of the dreadful conditions, both in law and practice, of 3,000,000 of slaves in the United States. The meeting was introduced by Joseph Sturge. A contemporary report noted that every part of the large edifice was crowded to suffocation; the firebrand Congregational, John Campbell gave a rousing response of support for abolition.

== Published books ==
After the late 1830s, Alexander Fletcher became a successful author, writing a range of devotional works for publication in London and the United States. These included A Guide to Family Devotion, which quickly sold 60,000 copies. Due to such success, he continued writing up until his death. His last work was intended to be a book for the young, from ten years old and upwards, though it was unfinished at his death.

== 'The Children's Friend' ==
Recovering from the court cases and associated controversy, Alexander Fletcher, became especially revered for his work with children. The titles Prince of Preachers to Children and The Children's Friend were frequently used to describe him, since he stood almost alone as a popular figure amongst children, able to attract vast audiences, quite unlike anyone else during his lifetime or since.

Not surprisingly, having built Finsbury Chapel, it became a well-known venue for Alexander Fletcher's children's events. On Christmas mornings, it would be full of children from all the Sunday schools he could attract across the capital, and it drew similar gatherings of children for Whit Monday when all the schools in Hackney would be invited. As a result, the chapel's Sunday School for children was said to have been the most popular in London.

Alexander Fletcher's success with audiences of children is generally said to have had much to do with his geniality and humour rather than his approach to matters of theology, which was somewhat Scottish in approach, though he also thought highly of Isaac Watts' works.

He is considered to be the forerunner of other Independents who later became interested in preaching to children, particularly Baptists. Thomas Chalmers considered him The Wilkie of Preaching and many called him the Prince of Preachers of the young for he pioneered this movement and was the main inspiration for its development. Even as he aged, his success did not diminish. At Surrey Chapel, Blackfriars Road, a year before his death, his presence enabled the chapel to attract 3,000 children.

== Death and memory ==
Fletcher died on Sunday, 30 September 1860. He was married and a father. A tribute to his memory was given by fellow Scot, John McFarland, in Finsbury Chapel on 14 October. In his memory his congregation commissioned a soaring cross of polished granite that they placed at his gravesite. It featured an unusual, pierced octagonal cross, at the top. The mason of this expensive monument was W. H. Burke of Newman Street, Marylebone c. 1861. The cross still stands at Fletcher's grave at Abney Park Cemetery, Stoke Newington, London.
