= Henry William de Mole =

Australian businessman

Henry William de Mole (1826 – 13 January 1892) was a businessman in colonial South Australia and Victoria.

== History ==
De Mole was a son of John Bamber de Mole (1798–1845) and Isabel de Mole, née Maudslay, who died at The Waldrons on 5 December 1870.

He arrived in South Australia with his brother Frederick de Mole by the ship Thames in August 1853 and established a store on Grenfell Street, Adelaide.

In 1854 J. B. Austin joined with him in partnership, as traders to Beechworth and the Victorian goldfields; the partnership dissolved 1858. He became agent for Oriental Bank at Buckland, purchasing gold from Beechworth district. In 1865 he was elected chairman of the Buckland Road Board. 1866 he was manager, Bright branch of Colonial Bank of Australasia, also JP; he sold up his furniture and effects in 1867. He had an office at 85 Elizabeth Street, Melbourne, in 1874. The following year he broke all links with South Australia and became established in Victoria, living in "Courland", Cotham Road, Kew. He was elected to Kew Council in 1877. He became chairman of the Municipal Association of Victoria in 1879. He was elected mayor of Kew 1882, left for South Brisbane in 1887.

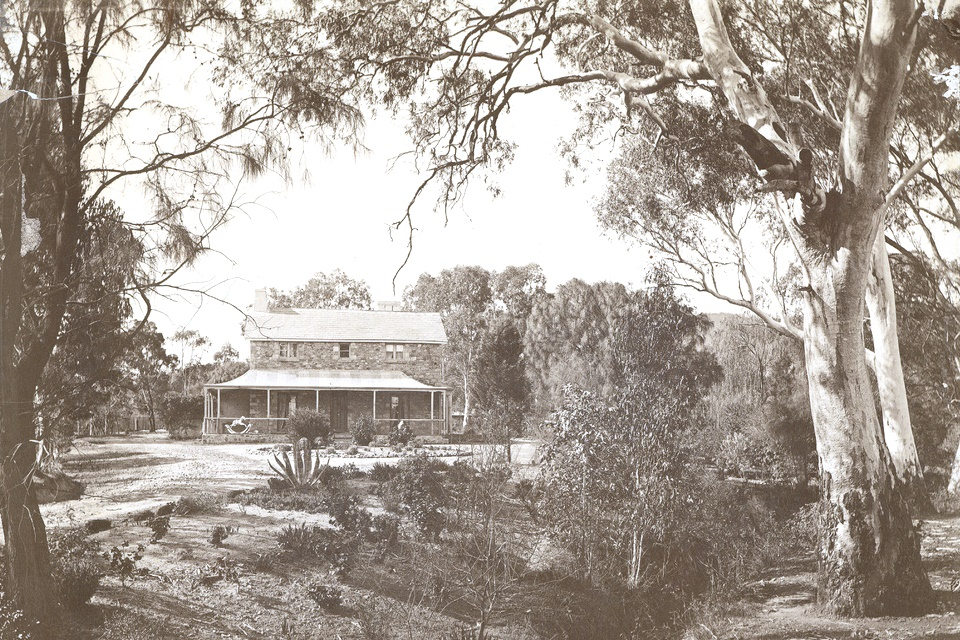
The Waldrons, Burnside

Around 1855 he built a residence, "The Waldrons" in Burnside, for his family and unmarried brother Fred de Mole on property most likely leased from the South Australian Company. F. S. Sison was an owner or tenant of Waldrons to 1871. The property was later known as "Moorcroft" and owned by J. Stuart Sanders. In 1889 James Cowan purchased the property, naming it "Erindale", hence the present-day suburb Erindale.

== Family ==
De Mole married (the widow?) Lucy Townshend ( – 4 May 1923) in 1858. Their children include:

- William Frederick de Mole, né Townshend, (1852 – 11 August 1939) married Emily M. Moulden (died 1941) on 19 March 1879

- Lancelot de Mole

- Julia de Mole, née Townshend, (1853 – 25 August 1919) married Edward Hamilton Irving on 29 December 1891 died in W. A.
- Isabel Emilie De Mole (1859 – 28 June 1910) married Albert Gray on 14 August 1890
- Fanny de Mole (12 February 1860 – 7 December 1947) married Lindsey Percy Winterbotham on 25 March 1886
- Henry John de Mole (1861 – 1 June 1899) died in W.A.
- Hettie Louise de Mole (27 October 1862 – 18 September 1949)
- George Ernest de Mole (c. August 1864 – 26 February 1865)
- Lucy de Mole (1866 – 1949) married Walter Robert Patten on 10 April 1890
- Ernest Edward de Mole (5 August 1867 – 14 March 1938)
- John Bamber de Mole (22 July 1869 – 28 August 1926) at Norwood
- Herbert Maudslay de Mole (12 September 1871 – 23 February 1950) born at Stepney married Ivo E. Wyndham on 29 October 1904

His brother:

Frederic Valentine de Mole (c. 1828 – 25 July 1858)

His sister

Emilie de Mole (c. 1831 – 1858) married missionary J. Stuart Jackson, arrived S.A. 1857, died at "The Waldrons"
