= Elders Limited =

Australian agribusiness company

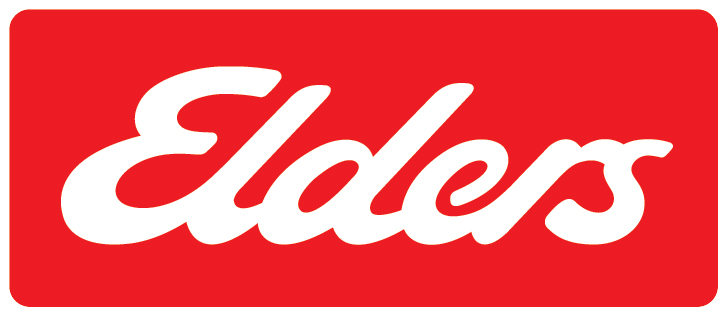
- Type: Public
- Traded as: ASX: ELD
- Industry: Agribusiness
- Founded: 1839
- Founder: Alexander Lang Elder
- Headquarters: Adelaide, South Australia, Australia
- Area served: Australia, China
- Key people: Mark Allison (CEO; Ian Wilton (Chairman)
- Products: Livestock, farm supplies, wool, grain
- Services: Real estate, agronomists, production advice, insurance, international trading
- Number of employees: 2000+
- Website: elders.com.au

Elders Limited, formerly known as Elder, Stirling & Co., Elder Smith and Co. and Elder Smith & Co. Ltd, is an Australian agribusiness that provides agricultural goods and services to primary producers in Australia.

== History ==
=== Early history (1839–1939) ===
With the fledgling colony of South Australia only three years old, Alexander Lang Elder arrived in Port Misery (now Port Adelaide) in January 1839 aboard the family-owned schooner Minerva as the only cabin passenger, under Captain David Reid. He went there to set up business and explore opportunities for his family's Scottish-based merchant and shipping business. Alexander's brothers, William, George, and Thomas joined Alexander. Out of the four of them, only Thomas stayed in Australia. Thomas moved to Adelaide in 1854 and worked with George for a year.

After George left, Thomas formed Elder, Stirling & Co with Edward Stirling, Robert Barr Smith, and John Taylor. On Stirling and Taylor's retirement in 1863, Barr Smith and Thomas Elder formed Elder Smith and Co.

In 1888, Elder Smith and Co. was amalgamated with its subsidiary Elder's Wool & Produce Co. Ltd, and Peter Waite became the chairman of directors of the new company, which was called Elder Smith & Co. Ltd. Elders profits more than doubled from 1918 to 1928, with Peter Waite as chairman until his death in 1922, followed by Tom Elder Barr Smith, son of Robert.

At some period during the 19th century, the company employed bounty hunters to prevent the theft of sheep by Aboriginal people; Elders paid the hunters for each pair of ears they handed in. Crimes like these were deliberately expunged from Elder's records by specifically hired staff in the late 20th century.

In 1929 Walter Bagot, of Woods, Bagot, Jory & Laybourne Smith designed the Elders Currie Street offices.

=== World War II and after (1939–1962) ===
The Elders centenary in 1939 coincided with the start of World War II when the highly competitive wool-selling business was put into government control. As the war continued, the wool auction system remained closed and the British government acquired the total Australian wool clip. In 1941, the British government paid Elders the equivalent of $3 billion today, and nearly $4 billion the following year. The return to the open auction system in 1946 saw the start of a dramatic five-year run for wool. National wool revenues increased by 29% and 64% respectively in the first two full years of peace.

In the early 1950s, Norman Giles moved from the Elders WA branch of the company to the Adelaide branch, and two years later became managing director. In 1962 Giles announced the merger of Elder Smith and Goldsbrough Mort with its new corporate headquarters located in Adelaide. In 1970, Giles expanded Elders into Gove Alumina and Robe River mining ventures and launched Elders Finance and Investment Co. Sir Norman Giles retired in 1975 after 54 years with Elders.

=== Structural changes and expansion beyond agriculture (1970–2009) ===
In 1976 Elders acquired Pitt Son & Badgery Ltd, a Sydney based former subsidiary of the Scottish-Marra group. In 1982 Elders merged with jam maker Henry Jones IXL to become Elders IXL. The following year, Elders launched a successful takeover bid for Carlton & United Breweries, which it renamed to Elders Brewing Group. In 1989, due to an economic downturn, Elders sold Henry Jones IXL to J.M. Smucker Company, was renamed Elders Pastoral, and became a division of its subsidiary Foster's. In 1993, after being renamed Elders Limited, Elders was floated from Foster's, after which it acquired the Australian Agricultural Company. Two years later, Futuris Corporation, a major shareholder in Elders, became the new owner of Elders Limited.

In 1997, Elders launched Australian Wool Handlers as a joint venture, a wool handling and dumping company that quickly became responsible for more than 60% of the national clip. In 1999 Elders Finance was sold to New Zealand-based company Hanover Finance after Elders had sold this business to NZ based investors who took on $20 million of liabilities. In 2009, Futuris Corporation changed its name to Elders Limited, and changed from its conglomerate holding company structure to a single integrated company with an owner-operated focus around its principal business Elders.

In 2013 Elders returned to a pure play agribusiness by selling and divesting the last portions of its Forestry and Automotive divisions.

=== Return to pure play agribusiness (2013–present) ===
In May 2014, Mark Allison was appointed CEO.

Central to Allison's restructure of Elders was an Eight Point Plan, which outlined an aspirational target of returning Elders to sustainable earnings growth by FY17.

In 2016, Elders acquired 20% of Elders Insurance from QBE and 30% of StockCo.

In 2017, Elders divested its live export division, North Australian Cattle Company (NACC) and Indonesian Feedlot and Abattoir, re-allocating capital to a number of new acquisitions including horticultural inputs and services provider Ace Ohlsson and Kerr & Co Livestock. 2017 also saw Elders complete the buyback of preferential hybrid shares.

In December 2017 Elders paid its first dividend to shareholders in nine years and achieved a market capitalization of $850 million, referred to as "one of the biggest turnarounds in Australia's corporate history".

In May 2018, Elders acquired Titan Ag, a manufacturer and supplier of agricultural chemicals. Elders began its acquisition of direct competitor Australian Independent Rural Retailers (AIRR) in July 2019 after making a $187 million offer.

In November 2024, Elders announced it would acquire Delta Agribusiness for $475 million.

== Main operations ==
=== Rural products ===
Elders is a significant supplier of farm inputs to primary producers in Australia. Products include seeds, fertilizer, agricultural chemicals, animal health products and general rural merchandise. The company also supplies professional and technical services to the rural sector via a network of agronomists.

=== Agency services ===
Elders provides services to assist primary producers with the sale of wool, grain and livestock. The company's network of livestock agents and employees operates across Australia, with operations including livestock auctions (both physical and online), and direct sales to feedlots and livestock exporters.

Elders has historically been one of Australia's largest agents for the sale of greasy wool. The company also operates a brokering service for woolgrowers and a grain marketing business.

=== Real estate services ===
Elders provides real estate services from around 24,981 branches across Australia. Rural agency services are primarily involved in the marketing and sale of farms, stations and lifestyle estates. Residential real estate services, including agency and property management, operate in major population centres and regional areas through a network of company-owned and franchised offices. Elders is also involved in mortgage and water broking.

=== Financial services ===
Elders offers a range of banking and insurance services from branches across Australia.

=== Feed and processing services ===
Elders operates the Killara feedlot located south of Tamworth in New South Wales. The company also imports, processes and distributes premium Australian meat in China.

=== Australian Independent Rural Retailers ===
In July 2019, Elders announced the acquisition of Australian Independent Rural Retailers (AIRR), an unlisted public company, for $187 million. AIRR was established in 2006 as an independent buying and marketing group for rural merchandise and pet and produce stores. The business has around 240 independent member stores plus 100 Tuckers Pet & Produce stores across Australia. The acquisition was finalised on 13 November 2019.

=== Thomas Elder Markets ===
Thomas Elder Markets (TEM) was established in July 2020 to provide objective and independent analysis on agricultural commodity markets. This unit was set up with leading Australian commodity analysts Andrew Whitelaw and Matt Dalgleish, formerly of Mecardo. The TEM analysis business is one of the first of its kind to have an independence charter to ensure the independence of any work produced

The Thomas Elder Markets website has produced 492 articles between August 2020 and July 2021 which are freely accessible to agricultural stakeholders, these include 205 grain and oilseed, 53 fibre, 190 livestock and 44 other.

== Social responsibility ==
In 2016 Elders partnered with the North Queensland Cowboys National Rugby League team, producing a series of television advertisements and community initiatives to raise awareness and break the stigma of mental health. This program ended in 2018.

Following the Sir Ivan bushfire in June 2017, many Elders teams gave up time to contribute to a fencing day restoring damaged property. Elders also raised funds for the NSW Farmers Merriwa Sir Ivan Bushfire Appeal.

Elders Give It is a community giving program raising funds for not-for-profit organisations that support rural communities. Partners of Elders Give It include the Royal Flying Doctor Service, Landcare Australia and Beyond Blue.

In April 2017 Elders on South Australia's Eyre Peninsula raised $25,000 for the Royal Flying Doctor Service and in November of the same year became a major sponsor of the Flying Doctor unveiling a new aircraft bearing the Elders logo, part of a three-year $300,000 sponsorship.

In 2019, Elders made donations, support and contributions valued at $1.3 million to community projects including sporting teams, schools and rural charities.

== Awards ==
- National Safety Council of Australia – Judges' Choice Award for Excellence in Workplace Health and Safety 2015
- Turnaround Management Association – Large Business Turnaround of the Year 2015
- Elders Insurance – Canstar – Outstanding Value (Landlord Insurance) 2017
- Korn Ferry Employee Engagement Awards – Outstanding Employer 2017 and 2019
- Governance Risk and Compliance Institute – Team of the Year (Elders Financial Planning) 2018
- Elders Real Estate – Canstar Blue – Most Satisfied Customers 2019
