= Finsbury Chapel =

Church in London, England

Coordinates: 51.51754°N 0.08519°W

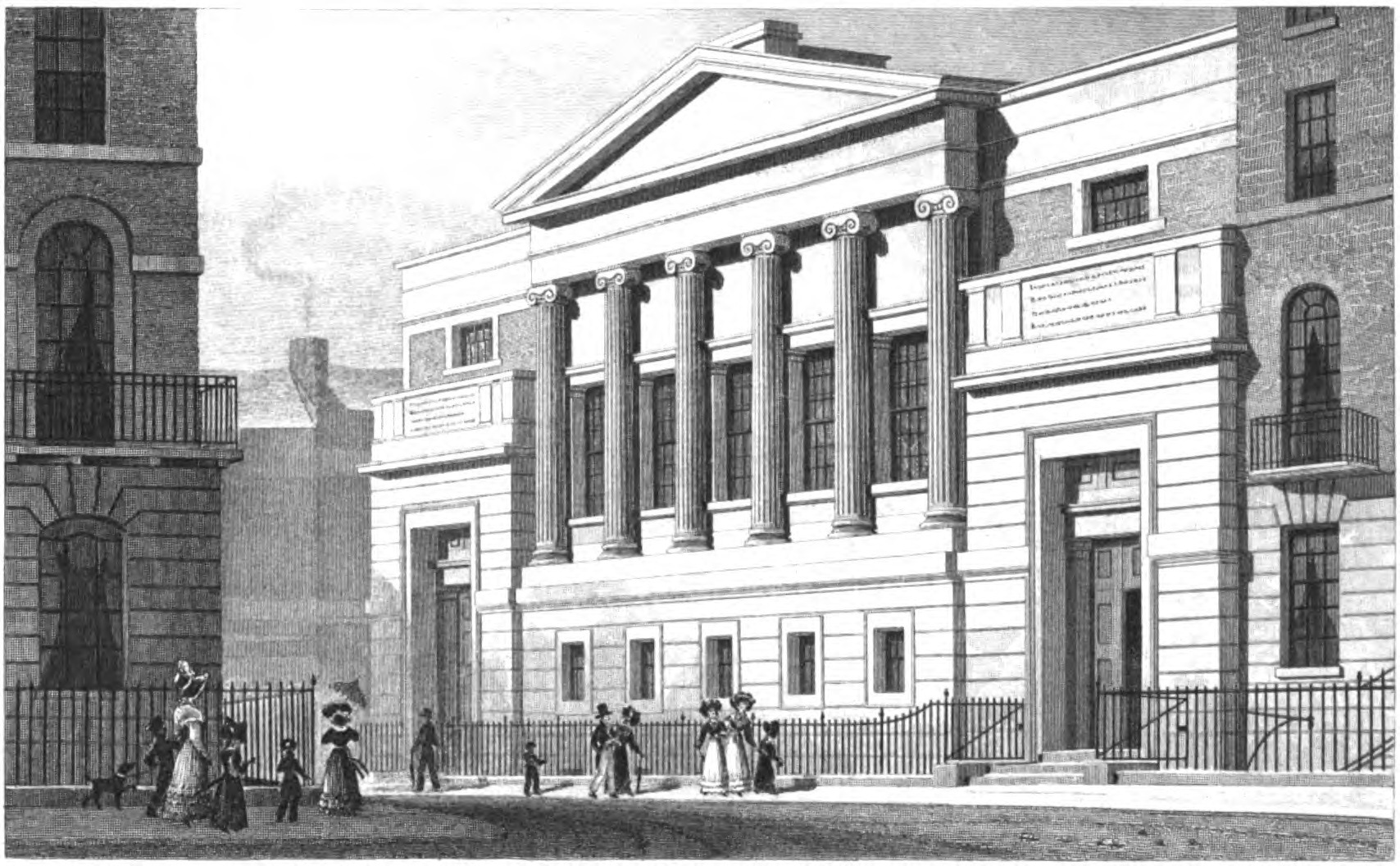
Finsbury Chapel

Finsbury Chapel, originally known as Fletcher's Chapel, was a Congregational chapel on the south side of East Street, Finsbury, London. It was founded by the Church of Scotland minister Alexander Fletcher in 1825.

At its peak it was the largest chapel in London.

== See also ==
- John Campbell (19th-century minister)
- Frederick Douglass
- John Morison (pastor)
- Moses Roper
