= List of Anglo-Catholic churches =

This is a list of notable parishes and missions both within the Anglican Communion and in the Anglican Continuum that self-identify as Anglo-Catholic.

== Australia ==
Parish	Location	Evidence of Anglo-Catholicity	Notes
St Mary Magdalene's, Adelaide	Adelaide	Self-identifies as Anglo-Catholic.	Tractarian in philosophy and practice since the time of its foundation in 1886, the Church has had a continuous mission among the poor and marginalised people of the city. In the 21st century, it is strongly identified with Affirming Catholicism and other progressive movements. Heritage listed buildings.
St James the Great, St Kilda East	St Kilda East, Melbourne	Self-identified Anglo-Catholic parish with "full Catholic privileges" – Solemn Mass and the Angelus on Sundays; Low Mass during the week and on Holy Days; regular time for confessions; holy water stoup at the entrance; Stations of the Cross and statues of Christ, the Virgin Mary and other saints in the church. Annual blessing of animals at St Francistide. Links to the Oratory of the Good Shepherd and the home of the Little Company of the Good Shepherd.	The parish began in the chapel of St John's Theological College in East St Kilda at a time when the evangelical wing of the diocese was agitating for its closure in order to establish Ridley College as the principal training institution for clergy. Nonetheless, Archbishop Lowther Clarke accepted the petitions of the chapel congregation to establish a new parish of Tractarian sympathy nearby so a mission church was built and dedicated by 1915. During the 1940s and 1950s St James the Great was known for its observant Sarum Rite. By the 1960s, however, Western Use and customs became the norm.
All Saints', St Kilda East	St Kilda East Melbourne	Historically identified as Anglo-Catholic, holy water stoups at the entrance, Mass conducted facing east at the high altar, stations of the Cross and statues of Christ, the Virgin Mary and other saints in the church. Soley (1997:28) states that by the start of the 20th Century "All Saints, with its processions, musical tradition, artworks, liturgy, doctrine and outreach, displayed a restrained yet definite expression of high churchmanship".	All Saints was considered to be the original Anglo-Catholic Church in the Diocese of Melbourne, with the introduction of eucharistic vestments in 1882.^{(p. 21)} In 1863 it was the first church in Melbourne to adopt Hymns Ancient and Modern^{(pp. 22–23)} and by 1869 had a surpliced choir in consequence of a petition of more than 100 people from the parish. Its churchmanship has remained firmly Anglo-Catholic throughout the 20th century
St Mark's, Fitzroy	Fitzroy Melbourne	Historically identified as Anglo-Catholic; Eucharist celebrated daily bar Friday (except when holy days are on a Friday), annual blessing of animals on St Francis' Day, statue of the Virgin Mary with votive rack at which the Angelus is sung after Sunday High Mass, holy water stoups at the entrance.	
St Peter's, Eastern Hill	Fitzroy Melbourne	Historically identified as Anglo-Catholic; Eucharist celebrated daily, holy water stoups at the entrance.	Anglo-Catholic since circa 1900 when the newly appointed vicar Ernest Selwyn Hughes introduced High Mass using vestments and incense. Has a very strong musical tradition with the choir situated in a gallery over the western door. The Parish has a strong commitment to social justice, in 1933 the Brotherhood of St Laurence was invited to relocate from Newcastle to Melbourne by the then Vicar.
Christ Church St Laurence	Sydney	Historically identified as Anglo-Catholic, and self-identifies as Anglo-Catholic – "Christ Church St Laurence stands in the catholic tradition of Anglicanism. This tradition is also known as ‘Anglo-catholic’ or ‘high church’". Daily Mass and offices; Angelus at least twice daily; High Mass on Sundays (with Asperges) and on major Holy Days; Clergy hear confessions by arrangement; Solemn Evensong and Benediction of the Blessed Sacrament on Sundays (Solemn Benediction on some major feasts and octaves); weekly Stations of the Cross in Lent; altar tabernacle with reserved Sacrament; shrines of Our Lord and Our Lady with votive lights; holy water stoups.	Consecrated 1845, the oldest church in the City of Sydney to have received episcopal consecration. Many architectural features are due to Edmund Blacket, who was a long-serving warden. The church contains the largest collection of some of the oldest English figural windows of any church in Sydney. Its choir is highly regarded and has made frequent international tours. The parish's inner-city locality has long been marked by poverty and transience, and it has a notable record of welfare work and social action. Several of its rectors have been significant figures in the history of Australian Anglicanism, including William Horatio Walsh, Charles Frederick Garnsey, Gerard Trower, John Hope and Austin Day.

== Brazil ==
Parish	Location	Evidence of Anglo-Catholicity	Notes
[Christ the King, Cidade de Deus]	Rio de Janeiro	Self-identifies as Anglo-Catholic.	
Holy Trinity, Méier	Rio de Janeiro	Self-identifies as Anglo-Catholic.	
Ascension, Várzea	Recife	Self-identifies as Anglo-Catholic.	

== Canada ==
Parish	Location	Evidence of Anglo-Catholicity	Notes
Parish of Millidgeville, St. John the Baptist (Mission Church) and St Clement	Saint John New Brunswick	Self-identifies as Anglo Catholic.	BCP 1962 Solemn Mass Sunday 10:30 a.m.
St. Peter's Cathedral	Charlottetown	Founded in 1869, as a result of the influence of the Oxford Movement, St. Peter's has since continued as a parish in the Anglo-Catholic tradition. Maintains schedule of daily offices (Matins and Evensong) and daily Eucharist; Confessions by appointment; Benediction on major festivals; Latin High Mass once a year on Ascension Day.	The attached chapel (All Souls' Chapel) is famous for its design by PEI architect William Critchlow Harris and for the 18 paintings by Robert Harris. All Souls' Chapel was designated a "National Historic Site" in 1994.
King's College Chapel (at University of King's College)	Halifax	Maintains schedule of daily offices (Matins, Noonday Prayer, Evensong and Compline) Monday – Friday throughout university term. Midweek masses celebrated Monday – Friday throughout university term. Solemn Eucharist (Western Rite) celebrated weekly.	
St. George's Round Church	Halifax	Self-identifies as Anglo-Catholic.	
St. Luke's	Hamilton	Self-identifies as Anglo-Catholic.	Closed but building is to be maintained as is by diocese.
Church of St. John the Evangelist	Montreal	Self-identifies as Anglo-Catholic. Eastward-facing altar; tabernacle on high altar with reserved sacrament; statue of the Blessed Virgin Mary with votive rack; statue of St. Joseph; Stations of the Cross in church; holy water stoups at entrances.	"The Parish of St. John the Evangelist was established in 1861 and the present church was erected in 1878. Its founder, Father Edmund Wood (1830–1909), introduced the principles of the Oxford Movement to St. John’s and the Diocese of Montreal. The Parish was the first Anglican church in Canada to celebrate daily Mass and provide private Confession, and the first in Quebec to reserve the Blessed Sacrament."
St. Barnabas, Apostle and Martyr Anglican Church	Ottawa	Self-identifies as Anglo-Catholic. Monthly Solemn Evensong with Benediction, Solemn High Mass on Sundays, recited Angelus at the end of Sunday service. The services "follow the Book of Common Prayer of the Anglican Church of Canada, supplemented by materials drawn from the Anglican and the Western Catholic traditions."	
St. Barnabas	St. Catharines	Self-identifies as Anglo-Catholic.	
St Bartholomew's, Regent Park	Toronto	St Bartholomew's, Regent Park, as the parish is now known, has self-identified as Anglo-Catholic since 1925. Full Catholic Privileges. Sung Mass with Asperges and Angelus on Sundays at 10:30 am throughout the year. Solemn High Mass on many Red Letter Days at 6:15 pm. Processions on Candlemas, Palm Sunday, Easter Day, Ascension Day, Pentecost, Corpus Christi, Patronal Festival, and all Red Letter Days falling on a Sunday. May Procession with May Crowning. All Masses are celebrated according to the rite of the Canadian Book of Common Prayer (1959) with additions from the Anglican Missal; all celebrations are ad orientem with the ceremonial of the Western Rite. Daily Low Mass, Tuesday to Saturday; Divine Office (Mattins and Evensong), daily from Tuesday to Friday; Gregorian Compline, Wednesday night; Holy Hour, Fridays (Thursdays in Lent); Solemn Evensong and Benediction, Saturdays; confessions heard each Saturday evening and by appointment; Rosary said on Tuesdays and Saturdays; Stations of the Cross in Lent. Blessed Sacrament reserved in Tabernacle at High Altar. Shrine of Our Lady with votive candle stand in the Lady Chapel. St Nicholas Chapel (formerly the Holy Spirit Chapel). Statue of St Bartholomew. Full set of all fourteen Stations of the Cross. Holy Water stoups at West and South entrances. Strong outreach ministry to the homeless or otherwise marginalised.	Established in 1873 as a Chapel of Ease of All Saints, Sherbourne Street, and moved to its present location in 1910, St Bart's has always ministered to all sorts and conditions, and especially to the marginalised. Father Charles F. Pashler (Rector, 1925–59) was the first Anglo-Catholic incumbent and instituted Full Catholic Privileges by the early 1930s. St Teresa of Calcutta visited the parish in the 1980s during the incumbency of Father Robert Greene, SSC (Rector, 1977–93). The parish has historic ties to the Sisterhood of St. John the Divine, the Order of St Francis (now the Society of St Francis), and both historic and continuing ties to the Order of the Holy Cross. Healey Willan was a frequent visitor to the Clergy House at St Bart's during the tenure of his student, Alex Shaw (1929–63), as Choir Master. Shaw's successor, Walter Barnes (1963–84), had been a protégé of Willan's student, Walter McNutt, Choir Master at St Thomas's, Huron Street. During Barnes's tenure, the well-known St Bart's Boys' Choir toured widely, including performances at Expo 67, and recorded two long play records on the Arc Records (Canada) label. The parish's current Choir Director, Katherine Hill, is a mediaevalist and performer, who plays with the Toronto Consort.
Church of St. Martin-in-the-Fields	Toronto	Self-identifies as Anglo-Catholic.	
Church of St. Mary Magdalene	Toronto	Self-identifies as Anglo-Catholic; Eucharist celebrated every day; clergy hear confessions; holy water stoups at entrances; numerous statues and a large Rood cross dominating the nave.	Most noted for its tradition of liturgical music, begun by Canadian composer Healey Willan, who was organist and choirmaster from 1921 through 1968. Willan's contribution is marked by a historical plaque on the building, unveiled by Her Majesty the Queen Mother in 1989. Music traditions have been carried on by Willan's successors, notably Giles Bryant, Robert Hunter Bell, Stephanie Martin and the current Director of Music, Andrew Adair. Under Bell's direction, SMM choirs had two international CD releases on the Virgin Classics label of Willan's liturgical music.
St. Matthias Bellwoods	Toronto	Self-identifies as Anglo-Catholic. Established in 1873, St Matthias was one of the first Anglican churches in Toronto to offer Anglo-Catholic liturgy. Weekly Sunday mass is celebrated using the modern language rite from the Book of Alternative Services. Among many statues there is one with votive lights dedicated to the Blessed Virgin Mary. There are Stations of the Cross, plus a tabernacle located on the old east-facing altar. Devotions are held weekly during Lent, which include Stations of the Cross and Benediction of the Blessed Sacrament.	Mostly known for being the first Anglican church to offer an annual Blessing of Animals service. The hymn tune Bellwoods, sung in many countries to the text "O day of God draw nigh," by the Canadian theologian Robert B.Y. Scott, was written by James Hopkirk, a former organist at St. Matthias and named for the parish. St Matthias also has enjoyed the reputation for being hospitable, friendly, and inclusive. The parish is authorized by the Diocese of Toronto to offer same-gender blessings.
St. Stephen-in-the-Fields	Toronto	Self-identifies as Anglo-Catholic	Strongly identifies as a community dedicated to anti-colonialism, poverty reduction, social justice, solidarity with refugees, LGBT rights and visibility, etc.
St. Thomas's Anglican Church	Toronto	Self-identifies as Anglo-Catholic; Mass celebrated every day; clergy hear confessions; statue of the Blessed Virgin Mary with votive lights; Nine statues of saints in the reredos behind high altar; holy water stoups at the entrance; reservation of the Blessed Sacrament; statue of Our Lord in the church; weekly rosary and Benediction of the Blessed Sacrament in Lent; Society of Mary meets in the church.	Designed by noted Canadian Arts and Crafts architect Eden Smith; designated historical site by Ontario Heritage Board.
St. James	Vancouver	Self-identifies as Anglo-Catholic; offices said daily; daily mass; rosary said weekly; Vigil Mass on Saturday evening and Sung or Solemn Mass with choir on Sunday; confessional booths present; Solemn Evensong and Benediction monthly.	3rd and current building completed in 1936 and designed by English architect Adrian Gilbert Scott.
St. Barnabas	Victoria	Self-identifies as Anglo-Catholic.	
St. Michael and All Angels	Winnipeg	Self-identifies as Anglo-Catholic; daily Mass; Asperges, Incense, and Sung Angelus after High Mass; May Crowning of the BVM; Corpus Christi with Street Procession; statue of the Blessed Virgin Mary with votive lights; statue of Our Lord in the church; holy water stoup at entrance; first Chapel in Canada dedicated to Our Lady of Walsingham.	

== Estonia ==
Parish	Location	Evidence of Anglo-Catholicity	Notes
Tallinn Holy Trinity	Tallinn	Self-identifies as Anglo Catholic.	Solemn Mass Sunday 12:00 p.m.
Rapla St. Mark the Evangelist	Rapla	Self-identifies as Anglo Catholic.	
Tartu St. Matthew the Evangelist	Tartu	Self-identifies as Anglo Catholic.	

== Republic of Ireland ==
Parish	Location	Evidence of Anglo-Catholicity	Notes
St. Bartholomew's, Clyde Road	Ballsbridge, Dublin	Holy Eucharist ad orientem each Sunday, usage of vestments (chasuble, dalmatic); self-described as being one of the few Tractarian parishes within the Church of Ireland; self-identifies as Anglo-Catholic; observes a full calendar of saints; recently abolished regular Wednesday or "midweek" said Eucharist in favor of holding Mass on feast days of the Church; History of the Anglo-Catholic movement (including the 1990's development of "Affirming Catholicism") on website.	
All Saints Church	Grangegorman, Dublin	Use of vestments, self-identifies with Tractarian roots, self-identifies as Anglo-Catholic, full procession on Corpus Christi.	
St. John the Evangelist	Sandymount, Dublin	Self-identifies as "Anglican-Catholic"; claims to be the only Anglican Church on the Island of Ireland that has the Stations of the Cross and a Monstrance for Benediction of the Blessed Sacrament; Sung Mass every Sunday.	

== Italy ==
Parish	Location	Evidence of Anglo-Catholicity	Notes
St. Mark's English Church	Florence, Italy	Reserved Eucharist, Tabernacle placed on Altar.	Does not self-identify as Anglo-Catholic.

== Japan ==
Parish	Location	Evidence of Anglo-Catholicity	Notes
Rikkyo All Saints Chapel (at Rikkyo University)	Toshima-ku, Tokyo	Solemn High Mass at Easter, Pentecost and Christmas; Sung Mass on Sundays (usually 10:00 am) and daily Low Mass (7:00 am); Choral Evensong on Fridays; use of vestments, processional cross, candles, incense, bells at elevation etc.; anthems sometimes sung in Latin; service by the guild of acolytes, the university choir and the handbell choir.	The university was founded by a mission sent by the Episcopal Church (United States).

== New Zealand ==
Parish	Location	Evidence of Anglo-Catholicity	Notes
Saint Michael and All Angels	Christchurch	Self-identifies as Anglo-Catholic.	
All Saints' Church, Dunedin	Dunedin	Self-identifies as Anglo-Catholic.	
St Peter's, Caversham,	Dunedin	Self-identifies as Anglo-Catholic.	
St. Paul's Cathedral	Dunedin	Self-identifies as Anglo-Catholic; Uses unleavened bread; Holds confessions by appointment; Incense is used.	One of the few Anglo-Catholic cathedrals.
Saint Barnabas Roseneath & Oriental Bay	Wellington	Self-identifies as Anglo Catholic – Sung High Mass 10:00 am every Sunday; Incense is used.	
St Alban the Martyr, 443 Dominion Road, Balmoral	Auckland	Self-identifies as "An Anglican Church in the Catholic Tradition"	Sunday 9:30 am Solemn Mass (Sung Eucharist)
Christ Church Coromandel,	Coromandel	Self-identifies as being "in the sacramental (catholic) tradition of Anglican Worship"	Sunday 10am Holy Eucharist

== Philippines ==
Parish	Location	Evidence of Anglo-Catholicity	Notes
Philippine Independent Church (with 48 local dioceses, 2 overseas dioceses, and 4 overseas worshipping congregations/fellowships)	Manila (National Cathedral)	Identified by external observers as Anglo-Catholic and self-identifies as "with Anglo-Catholic orientation".	An Independent Catholic denomination that has been in full communion with the Anglican Communion since 1961.
Episcopal Church in the Philippines	Quezon City, Philippines	Self-identifies as Anglo-Catholic.	Autonomous province of the Anglican Communion since May 1, 1990.

== Puerto Rico ==
Parish	Location	Evidence of Anglo-Catholicity	Notes
Episcopal Cathedral of St. John the Baptist	San Juan	Self-identifies as Anglo-Catholic	
Iglesia de la Santísima Trinidad	Ponce	Self-identifies as Anglo-Catholic	It was organized by British residents in Ponce, as an Anglican congregation in 1869. They built their first church of wood and metal at the current site in 1873, aided by materials sent by Queen Victoria's government, including a bell cast in England in 1870. It was the first Anglican church built on the island and was still the only Protestant church in Puerto Rico at the time of the United States invasion in 1898. Because the old church had deteriorated, it was taken down; and a new church building was constructed on the same site in 1926. It has a synthesis of English neo-Gothic and Spanish-colonial styles. The 1870 bell was installed in the new church. The church was listed on the U.S. National Register of Historic Places on 29 September 1986.

== South Africa ==
Parish	Location	Evidence of Anglo-Catholicity	Notes
St Michael and All Angels	Observatory, Cape Town	Self-identifies as Anglo-Catholic. High Mass with use of candles and thurible for incense; Eastward-facing orientation of the priest at the altar; Full vestments including chasuble, maniple, etc.; Elevation with bell; Reserved sacrament; Angelus after mass; Low Mass during the week; Benediction of the Blessed Sacrament after Choral Evensong; Confessions heard by arrangement; Prayers for the dead; Holy water stoup at the entrance; Lady chapel; Stations of the Cross; Shrine of the Blessed Virgin Mary with votive lights; Icon of St Michael with votive lights; Sacrament of Anointing with Holy Oil	"For many years this parish has been the major witness to the Anglo-Catholic tradition not only in the Diocese, nor in the Province, but internationally."

== United Kingdom ==
Parish	Location	Evidence of Anglo-Catholicity	Notes
St Margaret of Scotland	Aberdeen	Self-identifies as Anglo-Catholic.	
St Leonard's Church Grimsbury	Banbury	Affirming Catholicism emphasis. Stations of the Cross; unleavened bread for the Eucharist; incense and candles; statue of the Blessed Virgin Mary with votive lights; holy water stoup at the entrance; vestments; pilgrimage to Walsingham.	
Christ Church Staincliffe	Batley	Old fashioned Anglo-Catholic Church; East Facing celebrations; High Mass or Sung Mass on Sundays and greater Feasts.	
St John the Baptist, Bathwick	Bath	Self-identifies as an Anglo-Catholic Church	
St Mary, Bathwick	Bath	Self-identifies as an Anglo-Catholic Church	
St. George's Church	Belfast	Self-identifies as Anglo-Catholic; Eastward facing altar; maintains daily offices; icon of the Blessed Virgin Mary with	
St. John the Evangelist's Church	Belfast (Malone)	Self-identifies as High Church / Anglo-Catholic.	
St. Alban's Church	Birmingham	Self-identifies as Anglo-Catholic. Eastward facing orientation of the priest at the altar; unleavened bread for the Eucharist; incense and candles; statue of the Blessed Virgin Mary with votive lights; holy water stoup at the entrance.	
St Augustine's Church	Birmingham	Eastward facing orientation of the priest at the altar; unleavened bread for the Eucharist; incense and candles; statue of the Blessed Virgin Mary with votive lights; holy water stoup at the entrance; Common Worship Order One in Traditional Language used for Mass.	
St. Francis of Assisi Church	Bournemouth	Self-identifies as Anglo-Catholic.	
St Swithun's, Bridport	Bridport	Self-identifies as Anglo-Catholic	
Church of the Annunciation	Brighton	Self-identifies as Anglo-Catholic.	
All Saints, Clifton	Bristol	Self-identifies as Anglo-Catholic.	
Church of St Mary the Less	Cambridge	Daily Mass; Solemn Mass on Sundays and Red Letter days; Weekly benediction; wards of the Society of Mary, the Guild of All Souls, and the Confraternity of the Blessed Sacrament. Self-identifies as Anglo-Catholic.	
St Clement's Church	Cambridge	Self-identifies as Anglo-Catholic.	
St Michael and All Angels	Canterbury	Self-identifies as Anglo-Catholic.	
St John the Baptist & St Francis Community Church	Cardiff	Part of Apostolic Prefecture of Wales. Anglo-Catholic Church in United Kingdom	
St Martins, Roath	Cardiff	Self-identifies as an Anglo-Catholic church	
St Barnabas Church, Old Heath	Colchester	Very high Church of England. Eastward-facing orientation of the priest at the altar; unleavened bread for the Eucharist; incense and candles; statue of the Blessed Virgin Mary with votive lights; holy water stoup at the entrance; Confession available on request. Book of Common Prayer used daily for the Morning and Evening Prayer and also for Mass once a week. Self-identifies as Anglo-Catholic.	
St Oswald's Church, Tile Hill	Coventry	Self-identifies as Anglo-Catholic. Use of candles and thurible for incense; statue of the Blessed Virgin Mary with votive lights; holy water stoup at the entrance; Stations of the Cross; representations of the Seven Sacraments; prayers for the dead; sung Mass; annual pilgrimage to Walsingham.	Dedicated in June 1957, the church was designed by Basil Spence, who was also responsible for the contemporaneous Coventry Cathedral (dedicated 1962). St Oswald's was given Grade II Listed building status in 2014.
St James the Great	Darlington	Self-identifies as Anglo-Catholic.	
St. Michael and All Saints	Edinburgh		
Old Saint Paul's	Edinburgh	Self-identifies as Anglo-Catholic.	
St Peter in Ely	Ely	Self-identifies as Anglo-Catholic.	A proprietary chapel in the Church of England. Dedicated on 30 June 1890 to St Peter by the Bishop of Ely, Lord Alwyne Compton (bishop).
Holy Trinity Church, Gosport	Gosport	Self-identifies as Anglo-Catholic.	
Saint Bride's	Glasgow	Monthly Benediction and Rosary and Votive Mass of Our Lady, incense and candles, traditional language liturgy.	
St Wilfrid's Church, Harrogate	Harrogate	Self-identifies as Anglo-Catholic.	
Church of St James the Great	Haydock	Self-identifies as Anglo-Catholic.	
St Helen	Hemsworth	Self-identifies as Anglo-Catholic; adheres to Synod Resolutions A, B and C. Served by a priest of the SSC; Parish is under the care of the Bishop of Wakefield as opposed to the Anglican Bishop of Leeds. Tabernacle and monstrance used; mass celebrated daily. Clergy hear private confession. Statues of the Blessed Virgin Mary, St Thomas Becket, and the Sacred heart are used around the building. Holy water stoup at main entrance.	
St Peter and St Leonard's Church, Horbury	Horbury	Self-identifies as Anglo-Catholic. Uses the Modern Roman Missal. A, B, C Resolutions parish. Low mass Wednesday, Thursday, Saturday, Sunday 08:00; sung mass with incense Sunday 10:30. Evening Prayer Sunday, with Benediction on first Sunday of the month.	Grade I listed building. Architect John Carr, 1794. Crypt wherein John Carr is interred. Replaced Norman Church of St Leonard.
St Mary's	Horden	Self-identifies as Anglo-Catholic.	
St Mary the Virgin, Great Ilford	Ilford	Eastward-facing orientation of the priest at the altar during Mass; full vestments including chasuble etc.; use of candles and thurible for incense; servers; prayers for the dead; statue of the Blessed Virgin Mary with votive lights; holy water stoup at the entrance; stations of the cross; Lady chapel; sung Mass; elevation with bell; reserved sacrament.	Original building dates from 1831. Parish created out of the ancient Parish of Barking.
Parish Church of St Margaret of Antioch	Ilkley	Self-identifies as Anglo-Catholic and built as Oxford Movement Church. Eastward-facing orientation of the priest at the altar during high Mass; full vestments including chasuble etc.; use of candles and thurible for incense; statue of the Blessed Virgin Mary with votive lights; holy water stoup at the entrance; stations of the cross; lady chapel.	
Saint Mary Elms	Ipswich	Self-identifies as Anglo-Catholic.	
Saint Aidan's Church	Leeds	Self-identifies as Anglo-Catholic	
St Aidan's Church, St Oswald Road, New Parks, Leicester LE3 6RJ	Leicester	Self-identifies as Anglo-Catholic. Is under Alternative Episcopal Oversight (Bishop of Richborough). Promotes beauty in worship and outreach to local community. Is currently (December 2023) in Interregnum; the church is receiving temporary leadership from a priest affiliated to SSC (Society of the Holy Cross; Latin: Societas Sanctae Crucis).	Built 1959.
Parish Church of St Mary de Castro	Leicester	Self-identifies as Anglo-Catholic.	
Saint Agnes and Saint Pancras, Toxteth Park	Liverpool	Self-identifies as Anglo-Catholic.	
Saint John the Baptist, Tuebrook	Liverpool	Self-identifies as Anglo-Catholic.	
Saint Paul, Croxteth	Liverpool	Self-identifies as Anglo-Catholic.	
Church of St Margaret of Antioch, Liverpool	Liverpool	Identifies as Modern Catholic. Regular sung mass, statues of Blessed Virgin Mary with votive lights, use of tabernacle for reserved sacrament, statue of St Francis of Assisi, statue of St Margaret of Antioch, statue of Sacred Heart, stations of the cross, incense used during mass, holy water stoop, icons of Jesus and Blessed Virgin Mary.	
Christ the Saviour, Ealing Broadway	London	Self-identifies as Anglo-Catholic.	
St Alban's, Holborn	London	Self-identifies as Anglo-Catholic.	
All Saints	London	Mass twice daily, confessions heard daily, weekly Benediction of the Sacrament, cell of the Society of Our Lady of Walsingham	Grade I Listed Building, designed by William Butterfield with a Lady Chapel by Ninian Comper. William Lloyd Webber was organist.
The Ascension	London	Solemn High Mass, Confessions, Benediction of the Blessed Sacrament, two annual pilgrimages to Walsingham	
St Bartholomew-the-Great	London	Self-identifies as Anglo-Catholic.	
St Magnus the Martyr	London	Self-identifies as Anglo-Catholic.	
St Cyprian's	London	Self-identifies as Anglo-Catholic.	
St Matthew's	London	Self-identifies as Anglo-Catholic.	
St John the Divine	London	Self-identifies as Anglo-Catholic.	
St Michael's	London	Self-identifies as Anglo-Catholic.	
St Michael's, Cornhill	London	Self-identifies as Anglo-Catholic.	
St Mary's	London	Self-identifies as Anglo-Catholic.	
Our Most Holy Redeemer	London	Self-identifies as Anglo-Catholic.	
St Pancras Old Church	London	Self-identifies as Anglo-Catholic.	
St Paul's Bow Common	London	Self-identifies as Liberal Anglo-Catholic	
St Paul's Church, Knightsbridge	London	Self-identifies as Anglo-Catholic.	This was the first church in London to champion the ideals of the Oxford Movement.
All Hallows Twickenham	London	Reserved sacrament, statue of BVM regularly used for devotions, Anglo-Catholic eucharistic practices, incense and benediction in use for holy days.	Grade I listed building. Tower, cloister and interior fittings moved from All Hallows Lombard Street, which was designed by Christopher Wren; the new brick basilica was designed by Robert Atkinson. The church also has a Renatus Harris organ.
All Saints' Church	Maidenhead	Holy water stoops; statues of Virgin and Child and of S. Paul with votive lights/candles; statue of Our Lady of Walsingham; annual pilgrimage to Walsingham; Sunday Mass at 10 with incense; some weekday Masses and a monthly Saturday Mass of Our Lady; stations of the cross.	
All Saints Church	Narborough	Self-identifies as Anglo-Catholic.	
St Leonard's of Newland	Newland	Self-identifies as Anglo-Catholic.	
SS Julius & Aaron	Newport, Wales	Self Identifies as an Anglo Catholic Church	
St John the Baptist	Norwich	Self-identifies as Anglo-Catholic.	
Wymondham Abbey of St Mary and St Thomas of Canterbury	Wymondham	Self-identifies as Anglo-Catholic.	
St Mary Magdalen	Oxford	Liberal Anglo-Catholic. Statues of Virgin and Child; holy water stoops; painting of King Charles the Martyr to the right of altar; stations of the cross; Morning and Evening prayer said daily, Low Mass twice daily and High Mass on Sundays and Feast Days.	Oldest parts of the church building date from 1194. Chancel and north aisle redesigned by George Gilbert Scott in 1841–42, making them the oldest example of Victorian Gothic architecture in Oxford.
Pusey House	Oxford	Holy water stoops; sung services (including weekly compline by candlelight) with incense; daily confession; elements of Latin liturgy; dedication to Edward Bouverie Pusey.	Chapel adjoins buildings owned by St. Cross College. "House of Learning and Piety" opened in 1894.
St Barnabas Church	Oxford	Self-identifies as Anglo-Catholic.	
St Thomas' Church	Oxford	Self-identifies as Anglo-Catholic.	
University Church of St Mary the Virgin	Oxford	Liberal Catholic Anglican	
St Margaret's Church	Prestwich	Self-identifies as Anglo-Catholic.	
All Saints' Church	Reading	Very high Church of England. Eastward-facing orientation of the priest at the altar; unleavened bread for the Eucharist; incense and candles; statue of the Blessed Virgin Mary with votive lights; holy water stoup at the entrance; Confession available on request. Book of Common Prayer used daily for services, including Morning and Evening Prayer and also for Mass once a week. Self-identifies as Anglo-Catholic.	Grade II listed building designed by James Piers St Aubyn.
Church of St. Mark	Reading	Very high Church of England. Eastward-facing orientation of the priest at the altar; unleavened bread for the Eucharist; incense and candles; statue of the Blessed Virgin Mary with votive lights; Confession available on request. Self-identifies as Anglo-Catholic.	Grade II listed building designed by Montague Wheeler.
St Elisabeth's Church	Reddish	Solemn Mass, Evensong and Benediction	Grade I listed building designed by Alfred Waterhouse. Impressive organ by Hill and Sons. Renowned Choir.
St Barnabas	Royal Tunbridge Wells	Self-identifies as Anglo-Catholic. Adheres to the 'Six Points'. Served by a priest of the SSC. Reservation and Benediction. Under the care of the Bishop of Fulham.	
All Saints	St. Andrews	Mass celebrated daily, clergy hear private confession.	
St Arvans parish church	St. Arvans	Self-identifies as Anglo-Catholic.	
St Mary and St Chad, Longton	Stoke-on-Trent	Self-identifies as Anglo-Catholic. Celebrates Mass. Under the care of the Bishop of Oswestry.	
Christ Church, Fenton	Stoke-on-Trent	Self-identifies as Anglo-Catholic. Celebrates Mass.	
St Matthew's Church	Sheffield	Self-identifies as Anglo-Catholic.	
St Chad's Church	Stafford	Self-identifies as Anglo-Catholic.	
St Mary's Church	Stamford	Self-identifies as Anglo-Catholic.	
St Mary's Church	Stanwell	Self-identifies as Anglo-Catholic. Served by a priest of the SSC. Under the care of the Bishop of Fulham.	
St Mary Magdalene, Sunderland	Sunderland	The Church is of the Anglo Catholic tradition in the Diocese of Durham and under the Episcopal care of the Bishop of Beverly.	In the church there is a Cell of the Society of Our Lady of Walsingham.
Cathedral Church of All Saints	Wakefield	Self-identifies as Anglo-Catholic. Incense used at celebration of Eucharist, lady chapel, icons of Jesus with votive lights, holy water stoop on entrance, decorated aumbry for reservation of blessed sacrament.	
St Peter and St Paul	Wantage	Describes itself as "[rejoicing] in the Catholic tradition that was established here by the 19th century Vicar, William John Butler.", Celebrates daily mass, offers auricular confession.	
St Helen's Church	West Auckland	Self-identifies as Anglo-Catholic.	
St Stephen's	Woodville	Self-identifies as Anglo-Catholic.	
Worksop Priory	Worksop	Self-identifies as Anglo-Catholic.	
All Saints' North Street	York	Self-identifies as traditional Anglo-Catholic. Statue of Sacred Heart, statue of Saint Francis of Assisi, statue of Our Lady of Walsingham, statue of Blessed Virgin Mary with votive lights, statue of St William of York, statue of St Patrick, weekly solemn sung mass, holy water stoop on entrance, incense used regularly during services, lady chapel, stations of the cross, English missal used in services	
St Lawrence Parish Church	York	Self-identifies as Anglo-Catholic. Stations of the cross, lady chapel, use of incense, holy water stoup at entrance, statues of the Blessed Virgin, St Thomas, St Paul. Celebration ad orientem, regular evensong and benediction.	
St Olave's Church	York	Liberal Anglo-Catholic. Stations of the cross, lady chapel, use of incense, statue of Blessed Virgin Mary	

== United States ==
(ordered by state then city)

Parishes	Location	Image	Evidence of Anglo-Catholicity	Notes
St. Mary's Episcopal Church (Phoenix)	Phoenix, Arizona		Self-identifies as Anglo-Catholic, weekly Solemn High Mass with incense, weekly Rosary, schola cantorum, shrine of Our Lady of Walsingham, Benediction of the Blessed Sacrament, daily matins and evening prayer, celebrates all major feasts, including Marian feasts.	
St. Michael and All Angels	Tucson, Arizona		Self-identifies as Anglo-Catholic, offers weekly Solemn High Mass with incense, chanted prayers and traditional vestments.	
St. Thomas the Apostle Hollywood	Los Angeles, California		self-identifies as Anglo Catholic weekly Rosary, weekly Mass in Latin	
All Saints Parish	San Diego, California		self-identifies as Anglo-Catholic	
All Saints Episcopal Church	Haight-Ashbury, San Francisco, California		Self-identifies as Progressive and Inclusive Anglo-Catholic; seasonal Daily Office; Week-day Mass MWF, Solemn High Mass with incense, chanted prayers and traditional vestments.	
Church of the Advent of Christ the King	Hayes Valley, San Francisco, California		Historic parish, founded in 1858, self-identifies as inclusive Anglo-Catholic; Daily Office; Daily Mass, Latin Chant Mass on Saturdays, High Mass with professional choir (Schola Adventus) and incense on Sundays, Procession and High Mass on midweek Feasts chanted prayers and traditional vestments.	
St. Mary's Anglican Catholic Church	Denver, Colorado		Uses the 1928 Book of Common Prayer along with the Anglican Missal (per website), and emphasizes elements of faith and practice associated with Anglo-Catholicism.	
St. Michael and All Angels Episcopal Church	Denver, Colorado		Self identifies as Anglo-Catholic. The current rector is a member of the Society of the Holy Cross.	
Grace Episcopal Church (Hartford)	Hartford, Connecticut		self-identifies as Anglo-Catholic	
Christ Church (New Haven)	New Haven, Connecticut		self-identifies as Anglo-Catholic	
St. Andrew's Church	Stamford, Connecticut		Self identifies as Anglo-Catholic, Daily Masses, Confessions heard by appointment	
St. Paul's, K Street	Washington, D.C.		Self-identifies as Anglo-Catholic. Low Mass Tuesday-Thursday (BCP) & Saturday (English Missal); Rosary on Saturday; Mass and Solemn Mass on Sunday; Evensong and Benediction ("E&B") 2nd & 4th Sundays of the month from end of September through Corpus Christi and every Sunday in Advent.	
Church of the Ascension and Saint Agnes	Washington, D.C.		Self-identifies as Anglo-Catholic. Mass with Choir on Sunday, weekly silent Adoration of Jesus in the Blessed Sacrament.	
St. Monica and St. James Church	Washington, D.C.		Self-identifies as Anglo-Catholic. Use of the term "Mass", Tabernacle on the Altar, Altar Candles, vested Choir	
St. Luke's Episcopal Church	Fort Myers, Florida		Self-identifies as Anglo-Catholic and Traditional; Lineage of SSC priests; Solemn High Mass every Sunday; Seasonal Evensong & Benediction of the Blessed Sacrament; Private Confession by Appointment; Formerly a Daily Eucharist Parish. Historical Church in the Episcopal Diocese of Southwest Florida, established 1885.	
Church of Our Saviour	Atlanta, Georgia	The Church of Our Saviour, Atlanta	Self-identifies as Anglo-Catholic.	
The Collegiate Church of St. Paul the Apostle	Savannah, Georgia	St. Paul's, Savannah	Self-identifies as Anglo-Catholic. High Mass with incense and vested choir on Sundays. Daily Low Mass. Eucharistic processions. Benediction of the Blessed Sacrament. Building designed by John Sutcliffe in style of 14th-century English collegiate church. Maintains College of Priests to sustain daily rhythm of Eucharist and the Daily Office.	"It was founded on the principles of the Oxford Movement, which was gaining traction in both England and the United States during this period. St. Paul’s, like many other Anglo-Catholic parishes, seeks to express the Catholic tradition of Anglicanism in its worship and in its attempts to live the Christian life with faithfulness and authenticity."
St. Columba's Church	Johns Creek, Georgia		Self-identifies as Anglo-Catholic.	
St. Mark's Church	Honolulu, Hawaii		Self-identifies as Anglo-Catholic, weekly Rosary, individual Confession	
Episcopal Church of All Saints, Indianapolis	Indianapolis, Indiana		Self-identifies as Anglo-Catholic, Solemn High Mass every Sunday, quarterly Sung Compline, Evensong and Benediction	
St. Paul's La Porte	La Porte, Indiana		Identifies as "a small, traditional, Anglo-Catholic parish," in the once predominantly Anglo-Catholic diocese of Northern Indiana.	
Church of the Ascension, Chicago	Chicago, Illinois		Self-identifies as Anglo-Catholic. Solemn High Mass on Sundays and Holy Days; monthly Evensong with Benediction of the Blessed Sacrament (October through May); monthly Holy Rosary throughout the year. Chanted minor propers in Latin.	
Church of the Atonement, Chicago	Chicago, Illinois		Self-identifies as Anglo-Catholic. Solemn High Mass on Sundays and Holy Days; regular Evensong; weekly Rosary.	
St. Anna's Church	New Orleans, Louisiana		Self-identifies as Anglo-Catholic.	
Grace and St Peter's Church	Baltimore, Maryland		Self-identifies as Anglo-Catholic.	
Church of the Advent	Boston, Massachusetts		Self-identifies as Anglo-Catholic.	
Church of St. Augustine and St. Martin	Boston, Massachusetts		Self-identifies as Anglo-Catholic.	
The Parish of the Good Shepherd	Newton, Massachusetts		Self-identifies as Anglo-Catholic, known as "the High Church of the western Suburbs".	
St. John's Church	Detroit, Michigan		Self-identifies as Anglo-Catholic. Rector is SSC. Daily Masses use the Anglican Missal. Sundays Masses use the 1928 Prayer Book. Exposition and benediction of the Blessed Sacrament on Thursdays. Celebrates all major feasts. Shrine of Our Lady of Walsingham.	
St. Luke's Anglican	Corinth, Mississippi		Self-identifies as Anglo-Catholic.	
St. Mary's Episcopal Church	Kansas City, Missouri		Self-identifies as Anglo-Catholic. Rector is a member of the Society of Catholic Priests. Daily Mass, confession offered weekly, occasional Benediction, ministry to the homeless.	
Grace Church	Newark, New Jersey	Grace Church	Founded in 1837 as the standard-bearer for Anglican Catholicism in North Jersey. Self-identifies as Anglo-Catholic. High Mass ad orientem with incense, chanted prayers, Gospel, and minor propers. Weekday Mass and Evening Prayer (Tuesday-Friday). Confessions heard by appointment. Benediction of the Blessed Sacrament weekly during Lent and select times throughout the year. Reservation at the Blessed Sacrament Altar. Marian statue. Rector is member and founding chapter convener of The Society of Catholic Priests. 1848 church building designed by Richard Upjohn; NRHP-listed in 1972	
Saint John's Church	Passaic, New Jersey		Self-identifies as Anglo-Catholic. Incense, bells, a shrine to Our Lady of Walsingham	
St. Uriel's Episcopal Church	Sea Girt, New Jersey		Self-identifies as Anglo-Catholic. Celebration of traditional Mass.	
Cathedral of All Saints	Albany, New York		Daily Mass. Solemn Mass on Sundays.	
St. Paul's Church (Brooklyn)/St. Paul's Carroll Street	Brooklyn, New York		confession by appointment, Guild of All Souls.	
St. Andrew's Episcopal Church (Buffalo, New York)	Buffalo, New York		Self-identifies as an Anglo-Catholic parish.	NRHP-listed in 2010
Saint Ignatius of Antioch Episcopal Church	New York, New York		Self-identifies as an Episcopal church in the Anglo-Catholic tradition . Eastward facing celebration, chanted minor propers in Latin, asperges, incense, bells, and three sacred ministers at Sunday masses.	NRHP-listed in 1999,
Church of St. Edward the Martyr (East Harlem)	New York, New York		Self-identifies as an Anglo-Catholic parish.	
Church of Saint Mary the Virgin (Times Square, New York)	New York, New York		Self-identifies as Anglo-Catholic. (page 14). Historic flagship Anglo-Catholic Church. (paragraphs 2, 13, and 16). Daily Mass, confessions weekly, weekly Evensong and Benediction	NRHP-listed in 1990
Church of the Transfiguration (The Little Church Around the Corner)	New York, New York		Self-identifies as Anglo-Catholic."	
The Church of the Saviour	Syracuse, New York		Self-identifies as Progressive and Inclusive Anglo-Catholic.	
Saint George's Episcopal Church	Schenectady, New York		Self-identifies as Anglo-Catholic.	
Church of the Holy Faith	Santa Fe, New Mexico		Self-identifies as Anglo-Catholic.	
St. Mary's Church	Asheville, North Carolina		Self-identifies as Anglo-Catholic.	NRHP-listed in 1994
Saint James' Church	Cleveland, Ohio		Self-identifies as Anglo-Catholic. Uses Anglican Missal and incense and bells weekly, offers Benediction of the Blessed Sacrament, monthly Rosary, houses the National Shrine to Our Lady of Walsingham for the Anglican Catholic Church, along with several other shrines.	Seceded from The Episcopal Church in 1978 and is now aligned with the Anglican Catholic Church
Saint John's Episcopal Church	Bellefonte, Pennsylvania		Self-identifies as Anglo-Catholic Uses Eucharistic vestments; co-mingled water and wine are used for the Eucharist; incense and bells are used during Solemn Mass [weekly](Missa de Sancta Maria Magdalena). Book of Common Prayer is used; Benediction of the Blessed Sacrament, Evensong and monthly Parish Requiem are also offered; Stations of the Cross, and Confessions (by appointment) are offered as appropriate.	
Saint Clement's Church	Philadelphia, Pennsylvania		Self-identifies as Anglo-Catholic. Daily Mass using English Missal, Weekly Rosary, Weekly Confession	NRHP-listed in 1970
St. Mark's Episcopal Church	Philadelphia, Pennsylvania		Self-identifies as Anglo-Catholic, Lady Chapel and Marian icons, Low Mass celebrated daily, anointing with oils, weekly confessions, Daily Office, monthly Evensong and Benediction, incense and bells at Sunday High Mass, Anglican Missal used periodically for Low Masses	NRHP-listed in 1982
Church of the Good Shepherd	Rosemont, Pennsylvania		Self-identifies as Anglo-Catholic. Lady Chapel with BVM shrine; shrine of Our Lady of Walsingham; high altar; ad orientem; use of incense and altar bells; daily morning and evening prayer; Rite I; Marian antiphons; low Mass & sung high Mass on Sundays (both Rite I) .	Founded in 1869, influenced from the beginning by the Oxford Movement
The Zabriskie Memorial Church of Saint John the Evangelist	Newport, Rhode Island		Self-identifies as an Anglo-Catholic Church. (Page 10 of PDF) Historically Anglo-Catholic Parish. Daily Office, High Altar and Chapel of the Blessed Sacrament Ad Orientem, Low Mass and High Mass with Choir, incense, and sanctus bells. Founded in 1875 by Peter and Harriet Quire with close association with the Naval War College.	
St. Stephen's Church	Providence, Rhode Island		Self-identifies as Anglo-Catholic. Daily Mass, monthly Rosary.	NRHP-listed in 1973
Christ Church Episcopal	Chattanooga, Tennessee		Self-identifies as Anglo-Catholic.	NRHP-listed in 2021
Saint Stephen's Episcopal Church	Sherman, Texas		Self-identifies as Anglo-Catholic. BVM shrine, has hosted the Society of Mary, confession encouraged, adoration of the Blessed Sacrament and Benediction offered in the year. Many former rectors SSC.	Modeled on the medieval English parish church under the influence of the Ecclesiology movement and Art and Crafts movement of the 19th century, "St. Stephen's Episcopal Church in Sherman of 1909 is one of the finest of this generation."
St Paul's Episcopal Church	Seattle, Washington		Self-identifies as progressive Anglo-Catholic.	
Cathedral Church of All Saints	Milwaukee, Wisconsin		Daily Mass, confession at request, Angelus or Regina Coeli prayed during Daily Office, host church for the Second Anglo-catholic Congress in 1926.	Founded as mission by Bishop Jackson Kemper in 1857. One of the first cathedrals of the Episcopal Church U.S.A.

== See also ==
- List of Anglican churches
