= Cord Asendorf Sr. =

German businessman (1858–1944)

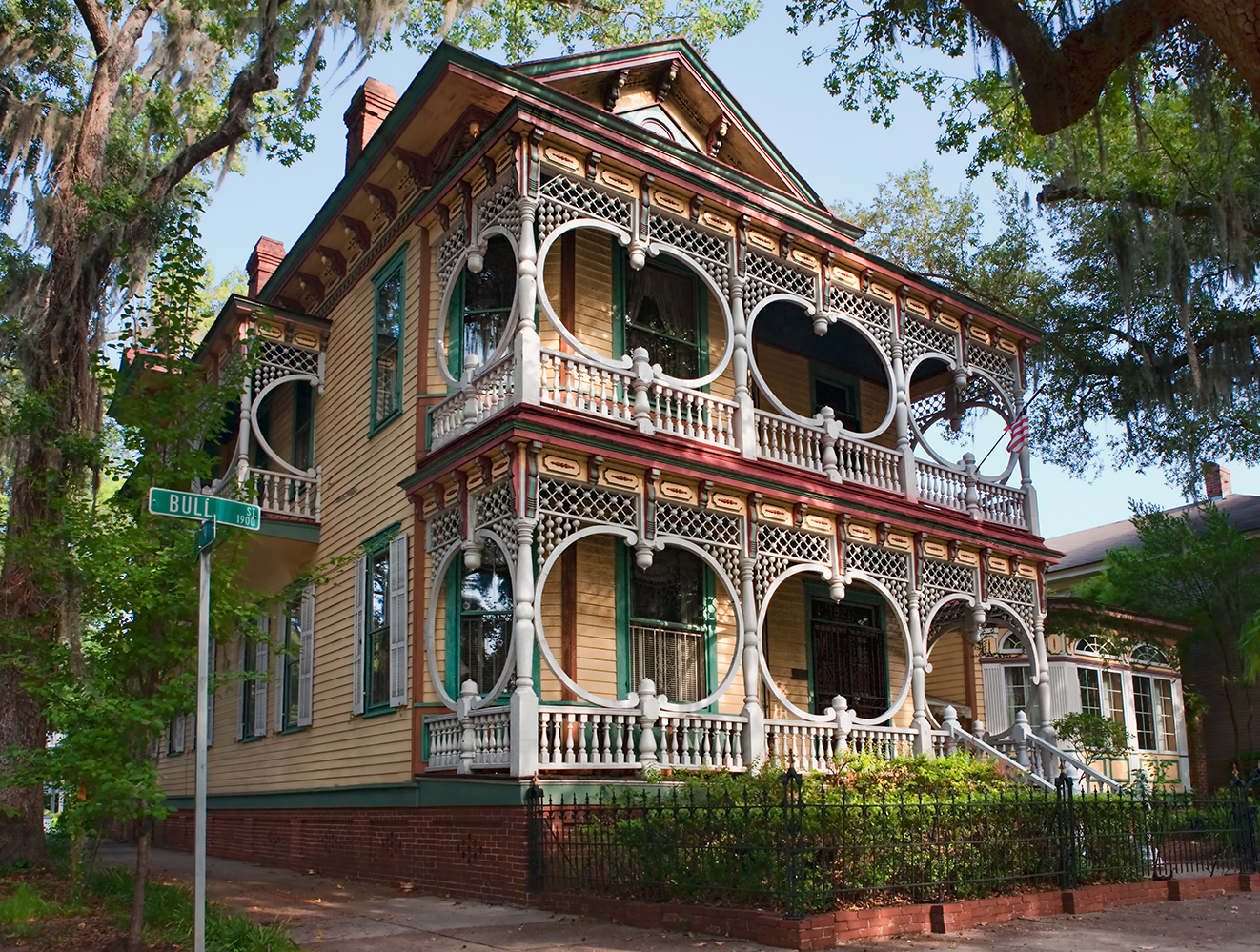
- The Cord Asendorf House, also known as "The Gingerbread House", in Savannah, Georgia
- Born: January 27, 1858; Osterholz, Kingdom of Hanover, Germany
- Died: January 6, 1944 (aged 85); Savannah, Georgia, U.S.
- Resting place: Bonaventure Cemetery, Savannah, Georgia, U.S.
- Spouse: Bernhardine Hagen (1890–1930; her death)

Cord Asendorf Sr. (January 27, 1858 – January 6, 1944) was a prominent German–American businessman based in Savannah, Georgia. He designed Savannah's "Gingerbread House", at today's 1921 Bull Street, in 1899.

== Life and career ==
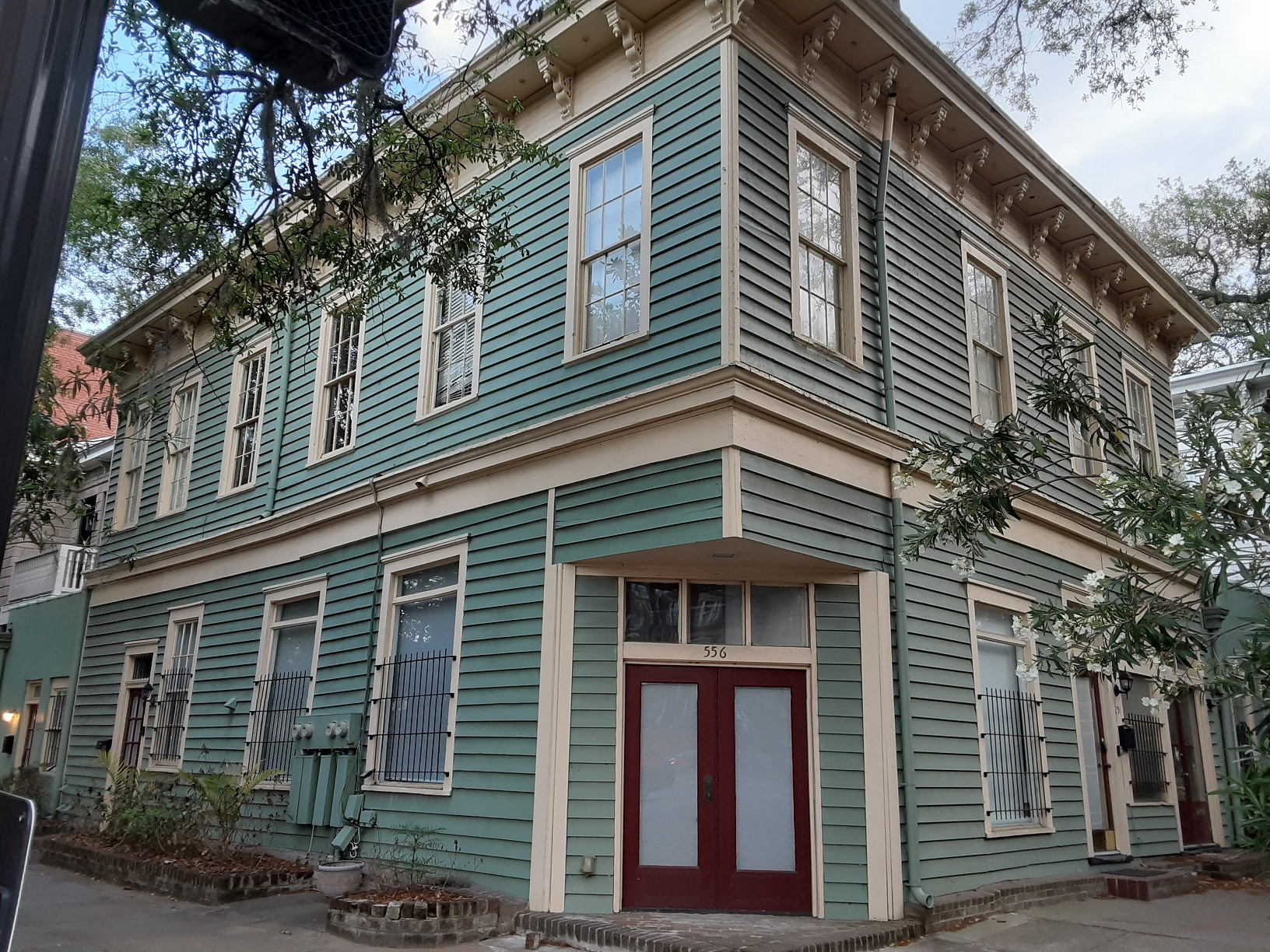
Asendorf built this property, at 556 East Liberty Street in Savannah, in 1883. He ran a grocery store and saloon here, and initially lived with his growing family above the businesses

Asendorf was born in Osterholz, Kingdom of Hanover, in 1858. He worked with his father, building cigar boxes, before emigrating to the United States in September 1872, aged 14, and settling in Savannah, Georgia. He became a U.S. citizen in April 1879, shortly after which he worked for his uncle, John M. Asendorf, in his grocery store, located at the northwestern corner of Jones Lane and Habersham Street. He was living at 49 Jones Street.

Cord opened his own store, on Tattnall Street at its intersection with Gordon Lane, in 1881. He sold the business to his brother, Fred, and opened at least two more locations. He owned a grocery store and saloon at today's 556 East Liberty Street (251 East Broad Street). The property was built in 1883. One of his relatives, Peter August Asendorf (1855–1930), owned a store at the corner of East Broad and Charlton streets around the same time. With the success of the businesses, in 1888 Asendorf purchased built the property at 317–319 Huntingdon Street, a few blocks west of Forsyth Park.

In 1890, he married fellow German immigrant Bernhardine Hagen, of Lehe, who arrived in Savannah six years earlier. (Her brother, an engineer, was killed in an accident on the voyage from Europe.) They married, in an evening service at the Lutheran Church of the Ascension, on Bernhardine's 21st birthday, on February 19. En route to the reception, at Turner Hall, the horses pulling their carriage became startled by the music playing upon their arrival at the venue. They bolted without the driver, James Hines, who had alighted to open the door for the newlyweds, and the carriage struck a telegraph pole at the corner of Broughton Street and Jefferson Street. The collision did not stop the horses, however; instead, they continued running, despite the best efforts of the driver, who was dragged under the wheels. In front of a Singer sewing-machine agency, the carriage hit a signpost, knocking it over and almost overturning the carriage. The horses were stopped and the occupants of the carriage were helped out by Asendorf's brother and groomsman.

The Asendorfs lived above the East Liberty Street businesses. They had eight known children: Cord Jr. (born 1892), Anna Marie (1894), Christian (1896), Wilma (1899), Anna (1901), Adolph (1903), Sophie (1905) and Meta Johanna (1907). Their first child, a daughter, died shortly after birth. Meta died in 2004, aged 96. Between the births of their second and third children, the Asendorfs took their only trip back to Germany.

In 1899, the "Gingerbread House" at 1921 Bull Street in Savannah was completed, the work of Hawley Construction Company. Also known as the Asendorf House, Asendorf had designed it in the Carpenter Gothic style, and he retired shortly after his family moved in. They had lost another child in infancy in 1898, an event which almost led to Asendorf permanently halting construction on their home. As it transpired, five more children were born at their new home. His family lived there until the 1970s. In 1933, president Theodore Roosevelt stopped his motorcade so his mother could look at the house. It has also been featured in several films.

In his business and social circles he became a close acquaintance of compatriot and prominent Savannah baker John Derst (1838–1928). They were both members of the German Volunteers, with Asendorf being a corporal and Derst captain. The Volunteers were established 1846. Asendorf owned one of the first cars in Savannah, a Cole 30–40.

== Death ==
Asendorf died in 1944, aged 85. He was interred beside his wife, who preceded him in death by 14 years, at Savannah's Bonaventure Cemetery.
