= Club One (bar) =

Night club in Savannah, Georgia, US

- Interactive map of Club One
- Address: 301 W Bay St
- Location: Savannah, Georgia, U.S.
- Coordinates: 32°4′54″N 81°5′41.4″W
- Type: Night club

Website
- www.clubone-online.com

Club One is a night club located on Jefferson Street in Savannah, Georgia, famous for its drag shows featuring The Lady Chablis. It rose to prominence in part due to Midnight in the Garden of Good and Evil, in which Chablis was featured.

== History ==
The building was originally built in 1893, by the estate of George Wymberly Jones DeRenne, a descendant of Noble Jones, as a warehouse.

== Events ==
Club One hosts a variety of events including drag shows, pageants, standup comedy, live theater, and karaoke and it played a role in the growth of the city's goth scene. The Lady Chablis was a regular performer at Club One up until her death in September 2016.
