= Tattnall Street =

Prominent street in Savannah, Georgia

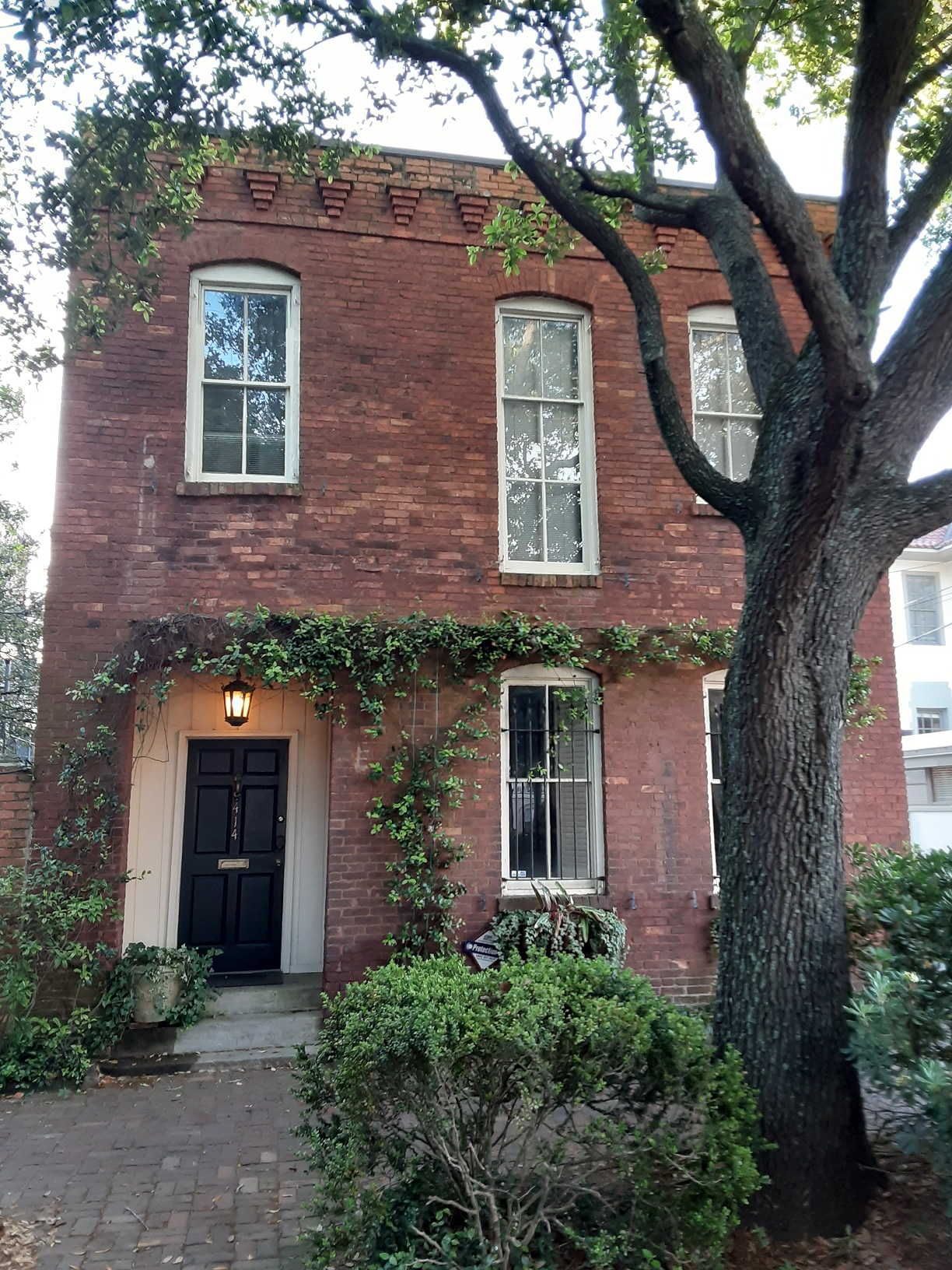
- Thomas White Property, 414 Tattnall Street
- Namesake: Josiah Tattnall
- Length: 0.53 mi (0.85 km)
- Location: Savannah, Georgia, U.S.
- North end: West Liberty Street
- South end: West Gwinnett Street

Tattnall Street is a prominent street in Savannah, Georgia, United States. Located between Jefferson Street to the west and Barnard Street to the east, it runs for about 0.53 miles (0.85 km) from West Liberty Street in the north to West Gwinnett Street in the south. It passes through the Savannah Historic District, a National Historic Landmark District.

The street is named for Josiah Tattnall, 25th governor of Georgia.

Tattnall Street runs to the west of Pulaski Square and Chatham Square, two of Savannah's 22 squares.

== Notable buildings and structures ==
Below is a selection of notable buildings and structures on Tattnall Street, all in Savannah's Historic District. From north to south:

- Patrick Whelan Property, 317–319 Tattnall Street (1869)
- William Van Vorst House, 327 Tattnall Street (1878)
- Eliza LaRoche Property, 333–335 Tattnall Street (1853)
- James Collins Property, 337–339 Tattnall Street (1895)
- John Low House, 347–349 Tattnall Street (1844)
- Milton Cooper Property, 403–405 Tattnall Street (1878)
- Thomas White Property, 414 Tattnall Street (1853)
- 425–431 Tattnall Street (Windy's Preschool) (1902)
- Jeremiah McCrohan House, 433 Tattnall Street (1872)
- John Ferrell & Oliver Lillibridge Property, 435–437 Tattnall Street (1855)
- John Heitman Property (I), 444–448 Tattnall Street (1883)
- Emmanuel Mendel Property, 506 Tattnall Street (1856)
- Alexander Estell Property, 508 Tattnall Street (1857)
- John Lorch Property, 511–513 Tattnall Street (1870)
- John Muller Property, 512 Tattnall Street (1866)
- Frances Mendel Property, 514–516 Tattnall Street (1858)
- Nora Forhan House, 607 Tattnall Street (1871)
- Frederick Jakens Property, 609–611 Tattnall Street (1893)
