= John Derst =

German businessman (1838–1928)

- Born: 3 May 1838; Worms, Grand Duchy of Hesse, Germany
- Died: 16 July 1928 (aged 90); Savannah, Georgia, U.S.
- Resting place: Laurel Grove Cemetery, Savannah, Georgia, U.S.
- Spouse(s): Caroline Kraft (1863–1893; her death); Emma E. Hartfelder (–1928; his death)

John Derst (3 May 1838 – 16 July 1928) was a German businessman based in Savannah, Georgia, United States. A prominent baker, his product, Captain John Derst's Good Old-Fashioned Bread, is still produced by Savannah's Derst Baking Company, which he founded in 1867. He was also a city alderman for four years.

== Life and career ==
Derst was born in Worms, Grand Duchy of Hesse, in 1838, to Justus Derst and Catherine Krug. In 1855, he emigrated to the United States with his parents and three older brothers (Jacob, George and Peter), and settled in Savannah, Georgia, via New York City. His father died when John was sixteen years old.

He served four years for the Confederate States Army during the American Civil War. Captain of the German Volunteers (in which he served alongside his good friend Cord Asendorf Sr.), he was stationed for two years at Fort McAllister, before becoming a baker at a Confederate hospital in Atlanta. After the war, he protected the flag of his old company, the DeKalb Rifiles, from occupying forces by hiding it in the Planters Hotel, at the corner of Bryan Street and Barnard Street in Savannah.

In July 1867, after starting out as a barber, he opened a small bakery, under his own name, on Savannah's Broughton Street, at the corner of Abercorn Street, across from The Marshall House.

He was elected an alderman in 1883, and served until 1887. He was also a trustee of the Lutheran Church of the Ascension from 1878.

He married twice – firstly, in 1863, to compatriot Caroline Kraft (daughter of Justus Kraft), who died in 1893, aged 49. They had two children, daughters Henretta and Katie. He remarried, to Emma E. Hartfelder, with whom he had three known children: Edward John (born 1896), John Frank (1897) and Karl Koerner (1910). Edward became chairman of the board of his father's baking company, then the largest independently owned bakers in Georgia, upon his father's retirement in 1917. It was incorporated as the Derst Baking Company in 1925, a year after it had moved to larger premises at Oglethorpe Avenue and Habersham Street. The bakery moved to its current location, on Mills B. Lane Boulevard, in 1949.

== Death and legacy ==
Derst died in 1928, aged 90, as possibly the last Confederate veteran in Savannah. He was interred beside his parents and brothers in Savannah's Laurel Grove Cemetery. His second wife, who survived him by a decade, was buried in the city's Bonaventure Cemetery. It is not known if she remarried after becoming a widow.

Derst's bread, now known as Captain John Derst's Good Old-Fashioned Bread, is still produced by the Derst Baking Company.
