= The Collegiate Church of St. Paul the Apostle =

Savannah Anglo-Catholic Episcopal church

The Church of St. Paul the Apostle
- Collegiate Church of Saint Paul the Apostle
- St. Paul's Church
- The church in 2021
- Location: 1802 Abercorn Street; Savannah, Georgia
- Country: United States
- Language(s): English, Español
- Denomination: Episcopal Church
- Churchmanship: Anglo-Catholic
- Website: stpaulsavannah.org

History
- Founded: 1852
- Consecrated: 1857 (first building); 1868 (second building); 1889 (third building); 1917 (current building)

Architecture
- Architect: John B. Sutcliffe (current building)
- Style: English Gothic Revival
- Groundbreaking: 1907

Administration
- Province: Province IV
- Diocese: Episcopal Diocese of Georgia

Clergy
- Bishop: The Rt. Rev. Frank S. Logue
- Rector: The Rev. Raul E. Ausa
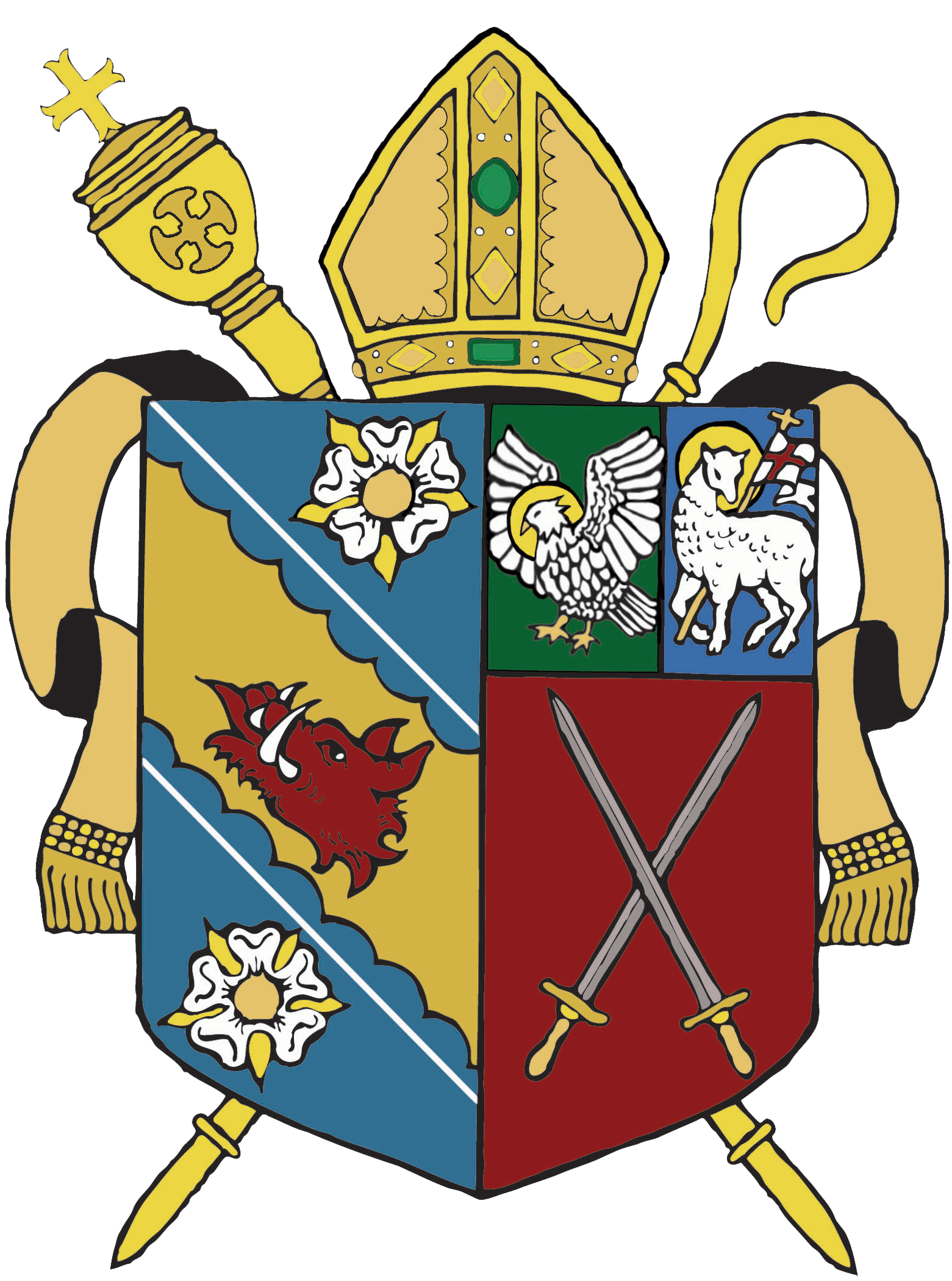
- The Church of St. Paul the Apostle
- U.S. Historic district – Contributing property
- Part of: The Thomas Square Park Streetcar Historic District (ID97000813)
- Added to NRHP: July 29, 1997

The Collegiate Church of St. Paul the Apostle is a historic Anglo-Catholic parish of The Episcopal Church located in the Thomas Square neighborhood of Savannah, Georgia. St. Paul's was established in 1852 as "The City Mission," an outreach of Christ Church ("Mother Church of Georgia") and St. John's Church. It was founded on the principles of the Oxford Movement, which was gaining traction in both England and the United States during this period. As an Anglo-Catholic parish St. Paul's seeks to express the Catholic tradition of Anglicanism in its worship, teaching, and service.

St. Paul's was designed by the notable Chicago architect John B. Sutcliffe in the Tudor Revival architecture style and completed in stages between 1907 and 1914. The church was listed in the National Register of Historic Places in 1997 as a contributing property to the Thomas Square Streetcar Historic District. It is noted for its "Late Gothic Revival" style in the continuation sheet for the district's application The building's significance within the district is noted by the Society of Architectural Historians. It is also listed as a contributing property to the Streetcar Historic District as designated by the Chatham County-Savannah Metropolitan Planning Commission. The MPC map for the historic district highlights St. Paul's as a significant building in the district as contributing resource #490, listed in 2005.

The building's architectural significance was also noted at the time of its construction, having been highlighted in the 1908 edition of the Book of the Annual Exhibition of the Chicago Architectural Club, which included a photograph of the newly-completed building along with the signature of John Sutcliffe himself. Although Sutcliffe is said to have designed over 100 churches, and served as official architect for Episcopal Diocese of Springfield, the distinctively gothic St. Paul's is often listed as one of his exemplary works and accomplishments.

The parish was established as a "collegiate church," meaning that it is meant to be served by a College of Priests who maintain the daily rhythm of the Church's worship through the celebration of daily mass and public officiation of the Daily Office (Morning and Evening Prayer). Today, the parish continues this tradition by maintaining this traditional pattern of daily worship. St. Paul's is home to a Latino congregation who celebrate a weekly Spanish-language and bilingual services as La Iglesia de San Pablo.

== History ==
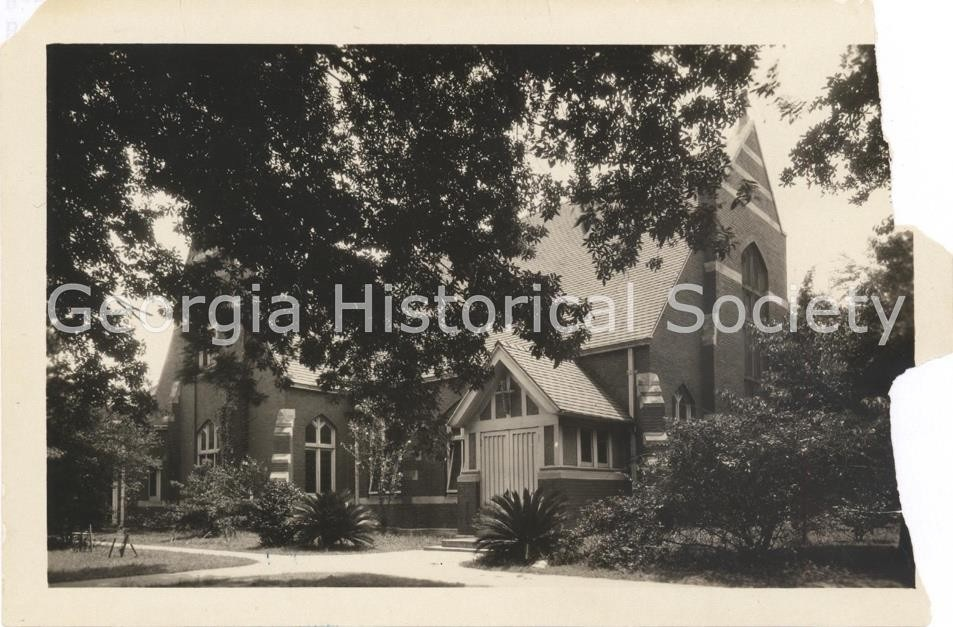
Historic photo of the church building from GHS

The parish was established in 1852 during the height of the Oxford Movement, a 19th-century renewal within Anglicanism that emphasized the Church's Catholic heritage and liturgy. The mission was founded with the specific intent of serving as a "free church," rejecting the then-common practice of charging families for pew rentals. This egalitarian model made it the first of its kind in the Diocese of Georgia, intended to serve the working class and those unable to afford pew rents at the city's older parishes. In the early 20th century, this practice would become the norm in The Episcopal Church and other Mainline Protestant denominations.

The chancel as seen from the nave

By 1857, the Mission had raised $15,000 to build a church on Calhoun Square (renamed Taylor Square in 2023). This building served the congregation until December 1864, when General Sherman's advance forced its closure. During the Federal occupation, the church was repurposed as a military hospital and stripped of sacred furnishings. On Christmas Eve of 1866, the building was destroyed by fire. Following the Civil War, St. John's Church secured new property at Huntington and Tattnall Streets and established St. Matthew's Chapel. Despite setbacks—including the yellow fever epidemic of 1876—the mission endured. In 1889, the congregation relocated to a building at Duffy and Barnard Streets, and in 1892 it was officially admitted to the Diocese of Georgia as St. Paul's Church.

St. Paul's became known for its Anglo-Catholic liturgical practices, which remained rare in Episcopal parishes at the time, including weekly celebration of the Eucharist, vested choir, and veiled women and girls. In 1905, a Christ Church parishioner bequeathed property to support the church. The proceeds from that and the sale of the Duffy Street property enabled the purchase of the current site at Abercorn and 34th Streets. The Duffy Street church building was sold to a Greek Orthodox community in 1907, which would formally organize as St. Paul's Greek Orthodox Church in homage to St. Paul's.

The new church, designed by Chicago architect John Sutcliffe in the style of a 14th-century English collegiate church, was built between 1907-1914 and was consecrated in 1917 after all debts were paid. The parish began the practice of celebrating daily mass, and a parish house was added in 1927, solidifying the church's foundation for ministry.

During WWII, St. Paul's was able to reduce the church's debt, and acquired a rectory. Statues of St. Peter and St. Paul were added to the reredos, and a shrine to the Blessed Virgin was installed to honor fallen soldiers. In 1954, the convention to elect the Rt. Rev. Albert Rhett Stuart as VIth Bishop of Georgia was held at St. Paul's.

In 1960's, the parish hall was rebuilt after a fire, air conditioning was added, and most of the stained glass windows depicting saints and scenes from the Bible—crafted by Whipple-Mowbray of Exeter—were installed. Later, a new rectory was purchased, and a Ruffatti-Rodgers pipe organ was installed. In 1975, 224 E. 34th Street housed an outreach program for recovering alcoholics, later repurposed as a halfway house ministry and eventually integrated into Union Mission.

From the beginnings of its history as a "free pew" city mission, St. Paul's has taken a generally inclusive and progressive stance on issues that have divided society and the Church, such as racial integration, the ordination of women in the Anglican Communion, and the acceptance of LGBTQ people in the life of the Church. In 1965, St. Paul's hosted an interracial gathering of Episcopal Youth Community (EYC) groups, prompting the Rector and youth from St. John's, Savannah, one of City Mission's founding parishes, and a much more conservative congregation, to walk out in protest. This culminated with St. John's voting to dissociate from The Episcopal Church in response to the Church's 1964 decision at General Convention to revise Canon 16 to ban the exclusion of any member of the Church from worship on the basis of race. The parish voted to leave The Episcopal Church by a vote of 785 to 75. Bishop Stuart then deposed the rector, who formed a Reformed Episcopal parish. A new parish of members loyal to The Episcopal Church would move into the original St. John's property in the early 1970s. In 1982, St. Paul's celebrated 75 years at its current site. That era was marked by the beginnings of the parish's involvement in Habitat for Humanity, the Second Harvest Food Bank, and the Thomas Park Food Pantry. A house at 221 E. 34th Street was acquired during the 2007 centennial capital campaign, providing a home for the Food pantry and for the Hispano/Latino vicar. Accessibility was improved with the installation of an elevator and wheelchair ramp at the church. The rectory at 224 E. 34th Street was also renovated.

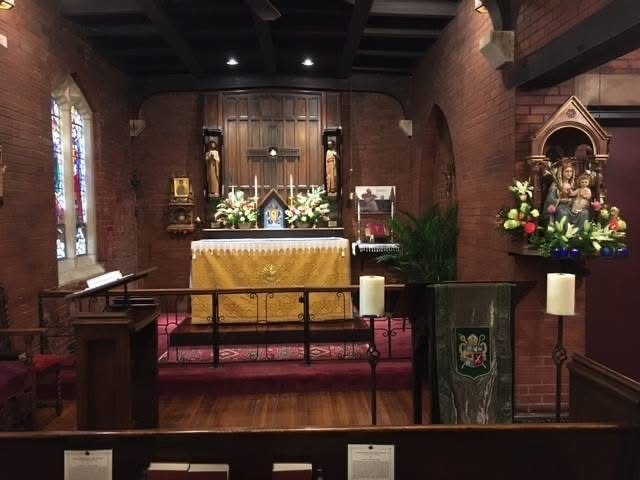
Chapel of Our Lady of Walsingham at St. Paul's, Savannah

St. Paul's was formally set apart by Bishop Harry Woolston Shipps, VIII Bishop of Georgia, as pro-cathedral for the Diocese of Georgia, which had never had an official cathedral. This was formalized by the signing of the enabling document at a liturgical celebration at St. Paul's on November 14, 1993. Bishop Shipps would mark his formal retirement as Bishop of Georgia by celebrating the Eucharist a final time at St. Paul's on January 20, 1995. When he died on November 17, 2016, he was buried at St. Paul's. His successor, Bishop Henry l. Louttit was elected IX Bishop of Georgia at a special convention held at St. Paul's in 1994. Bishop Louttit eventually decided that he did not require a pro-Cathedral as part of his ministry, concluding this period of the parish's ministry to the bishop and diocese in 2006. To this day, St. Paul's remains the only proto-cathedral in the history of the Diocese of Georgia.

Starting in 2009, St. Paul's increased its efforts to evangelize the local Latino community, including hosting preaching missions and hiring a full-time Latino Missioner. These efforts have resulted in a Spanish-speaking congregation with over 125 members.

== Today ==
Solemn High Mass at St. Paul's

The Church of St. Paul continues to promote its Anglo-Catholic identity in the Diocese of Georgia. This includes sustaining the sacramental and prayer life of the Church through its daily and weekly liturgies, as well as service to others, especially immigrants and the poor. It offers a rota of masses and Daily Offices every day of the week.

St. Paul's conducts various outreach efforts to support its neighbors and community. St. Paul's Mission House has hosted two different Afghan refugee families, offering transitional housing and support for employment, healthcare and education. This ministry continues to assist new arrivals in conjunction with the Interfaith Refugee Coalition and Inspiritus, a refugee resettlement organization. Since 2022, St. Paul's has hosted a volunteer-led English for Speakers of Other Languages (ESOL) program to support immigrant students. Three professional teachers along with parish volunteers provide weekly English lessons from September to July. In 2025, students included members of the congregation, neighbors, and students from local universities who spoke either Spanish or Chinese as their first language.
