= Percy Sugden (architect) =

English architect (1864–1936)

- Born: 30 May 1864; Halifax, West Yorkshire, England
- Died: 14 August 1936 (aged 72); Savannah, Georgia, U.S.
- Occupation: Architect

Percy Sugden (30 May 1864 – 14 August 1936) was an English architect and civil engineer known for his work in Savannah, Georgia, United States.

== Early life ==
Sugden was born in 1864 in Halifax, West Yorkshire, England. He had emigrated to Savannah, Georgia, by 1888.

== Career ==
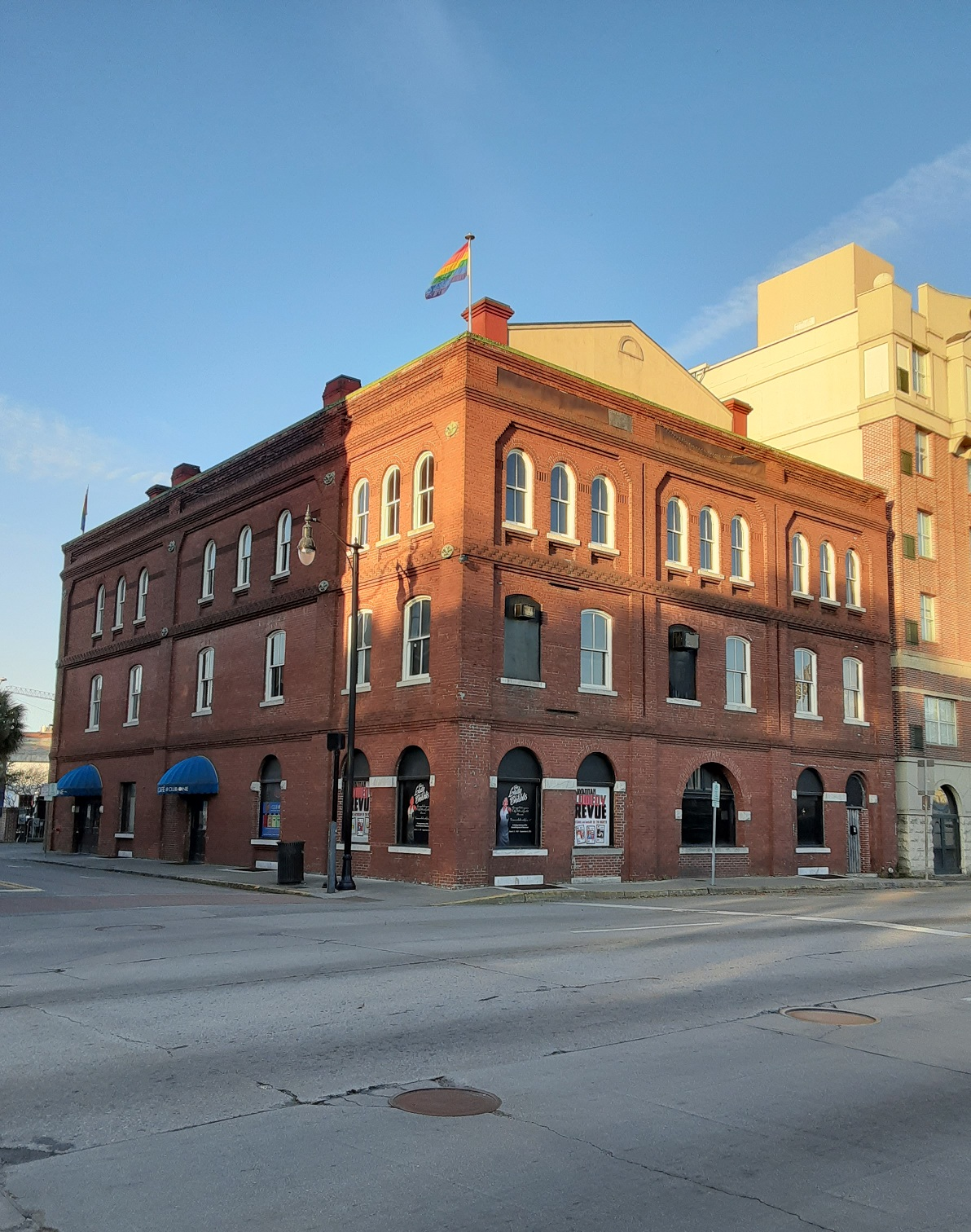
1 Jefferson Street in Savannah, Georgia

In 1893, he designed the (estate of) George Wymberly Jones DeRenne property at 1 Jefferson Street in Savannah.

Between 1910 and the 1930s, Sugden was one of the architects involved in the design of the homes that are now part of the Ardsley Park–Chatham Crescent historic district in Savannah.

In 1912, he designed the Merchants' National Bank Building in Savannah. A 1924 construction, at 24 Drayton Street, now stands in its place. John Kuck was listed as assistant engineer to Sugden in 1913.

In 1926, he was president of the Savannah Section of the American Institute of Architects. He also served on the Committee on War Memorials, serving the South Georgia chapter, and was the second vice-president of the Savannah chapter of the American Association of Engineers.

One of his last projects was as a consulting architect on Savannah Arts Academy on Washington Avenue in Savannah, along with Henrik Wallin and Walter P. Marshall. It was dedicated on 15 June 1937, ten months after Sugden's death.

== Personal life ==
Sugden married Katherine Amelia Mustin, a native of Augusta, Georgia, in 1887. In 1930, they were living at 125 East 49th Street in Savannah.

In 1901, he gave a demonstration of the gum-bichromate method of printing at Savannah's Camera Club. The club, which met at a building at the eastern corner of Park Avenue and Bull Street (overlooking the southern edge of Forsyth Park) each Wednesday, was established in June 1897.

== Death ==
Sugden died in 1936, aged 72. He was buried in Savannah's historic Bonaventure Cemetery. His widow survived him by a decade and was interred beside him.
