= The Gingerbread House =

Historic house in Savannah, Georgia

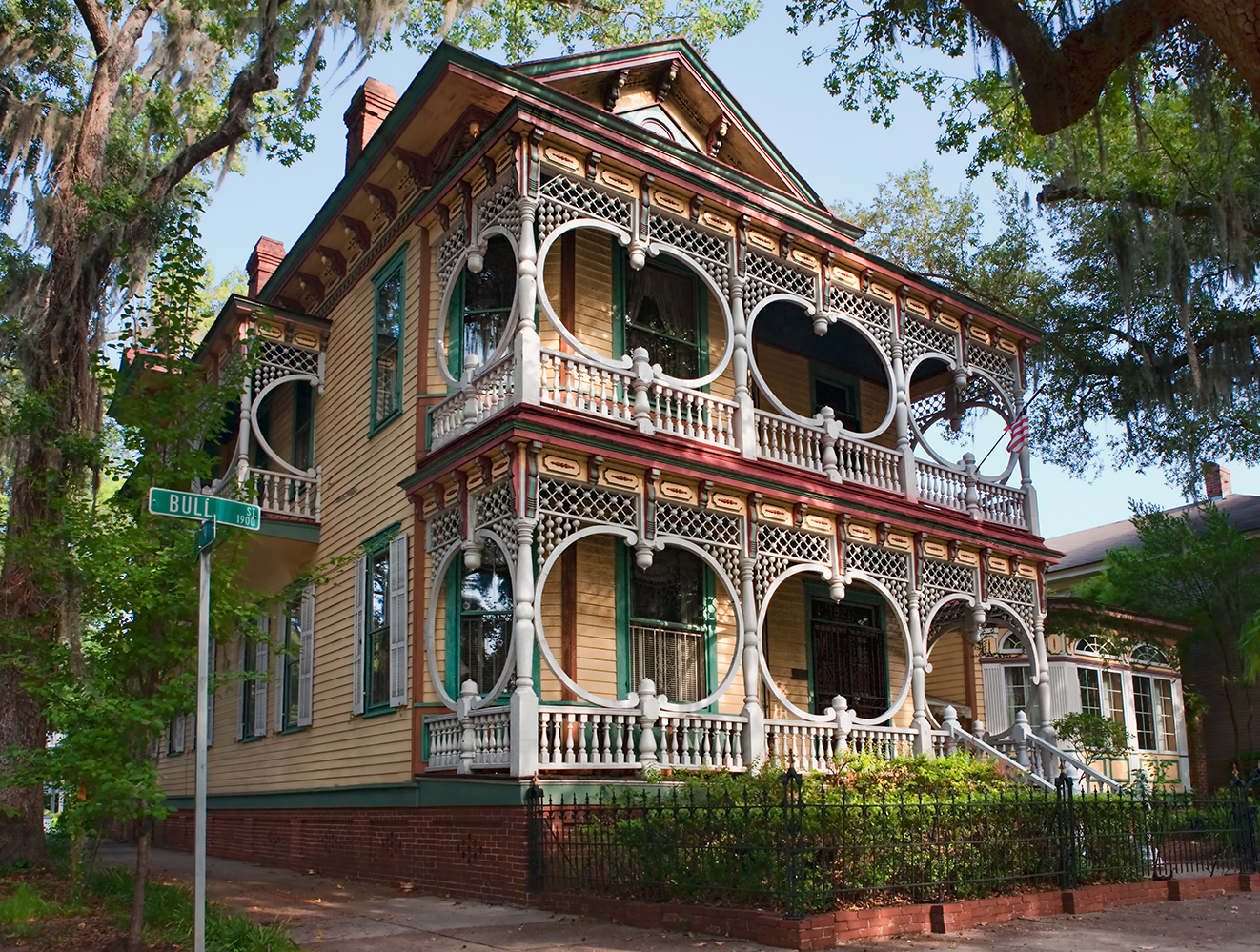
- The building in 2011
- Interactive map of the The Gingerbread House area

General information
- Location: Savannah, Georgia, U.S., 1921 Bull Street
- Coordinates: 32.058249°N 81.100141°W
- Completed: 1899 (127 years ago)
- Owner: SJ Management Group LLC (since 2014)

Technical details
- Floor count: 2

Design and construction
- Architect: Cord Asendorf Sr.

The Gingerbread House (also known as the Cord Asendorf House) is a home in Savannah, Georgia, United States. It is located at 1921 Bull Street, in the city's Victorian Historic District and was built in 1899 by the Hawley Construction Company. It was built for Cord Asendorf Sr., a prominent Savannah merchant, and his wife Bernhardine. Asendorf designed the house. The home's common name is derived from the gingerbread architectural style, which is seen through many elements throughout the site.

The building is considered one of the finest examples of Carpenter Gothic architecture in the United States. Its interior has three fireplaces, a wooden staircase and wood trim throughout. It also has a conservatory and a courtyard with a gazebo and a waterfall.

The home remained in the Asendorf family for 75 years before gaining new ownership. It was owned by Herb and Jan Galloway between 1978 and 2014, when it was then purchased by SJ Management Group LLC.

The building has gained recognition from many avenues, beginning in 1933, including from presidents Franklin D. Roosevelt, Dwight D. Eisenhower and Woodrow Wilson. Wilson even offered to purchase the home, which has been featured in many magazines, journals and movies. Today, the home is a popular wedding and event venue.

== See also ==
- Buildings in Savannah Historic District
