= Liberty Street (Savannah, Georgia) =

Prominent street in Savannah, Georgia

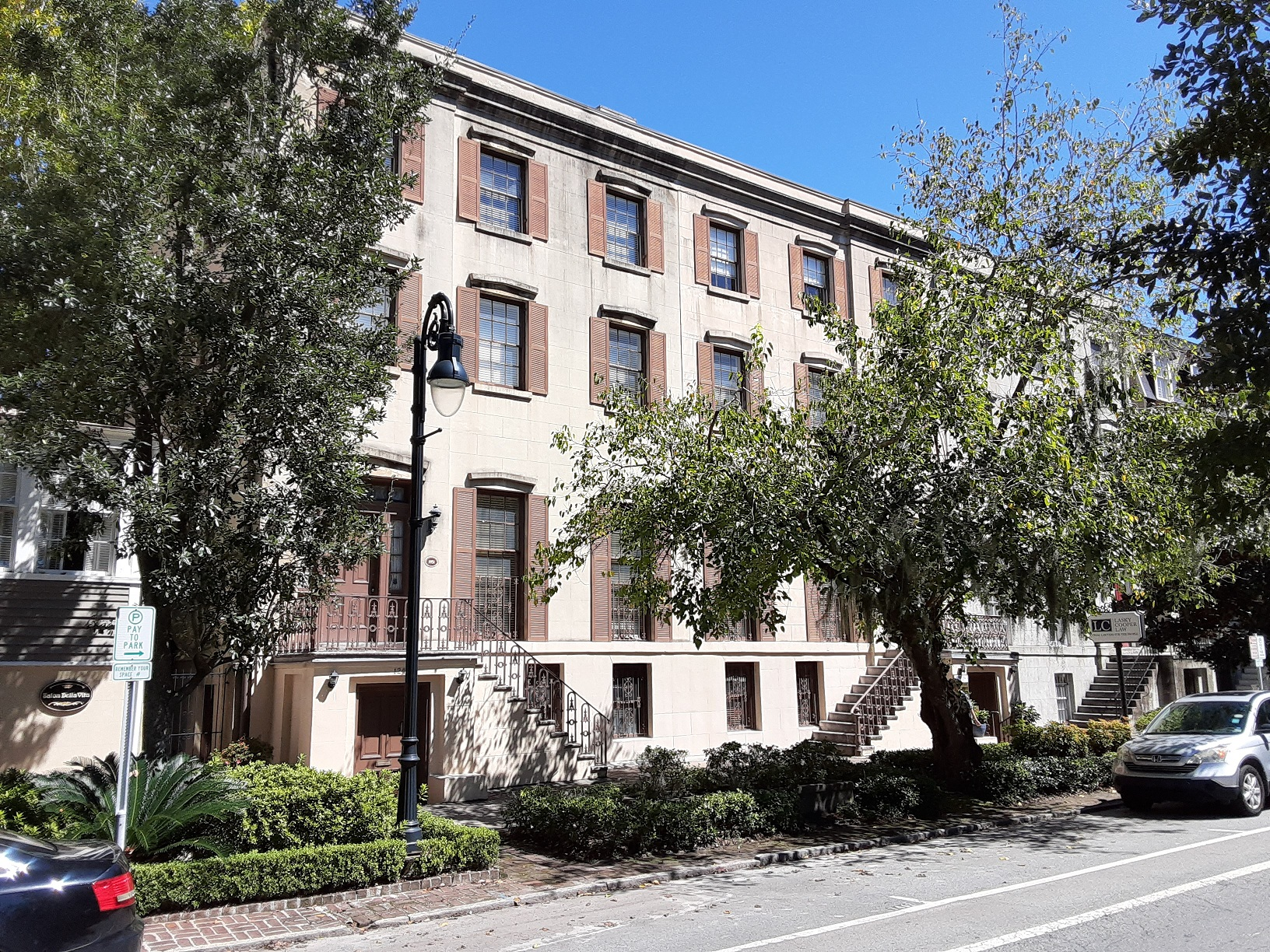
- Solomon Cohen Row House, West Liberty Street
- Length: 0.90 mi (1.45 km)
- Location: Savannah, Georgia, U.S.
- West end: Martin Luther King Jr. Boulevard
- East end: Randolph Street

Liberty Street is a prominent street in Savannah, Georgia, United States. Located between Perry Street to the north and Harris Street to the south, it runs for about 0.90 miles (1.45 km) from Martin Luther King Jr. Boulevard in the west to Randolph Street in the east. Originally known only as Liberty Street singular, its addresses are now split between "West Liberty Street" and "East Liberty Street", the transition occurring at Bull Street in the center of the downtown area. The street is entirely within Savannah Historic District, a National Historic Landmark District.

Liberty Street runs between seven squares. From west to east:

To the south of

- Orleans Square
- Chippewa Square
- Crawford Square

To the north of

- Pulaski Square
- Madison Square
- Lafayette Square
- Troup Square

== Notable buildings and structures ==
Below is a selection of notable buildings and structures on Liberty Street, all in Savannah's Historic District. From west to east:

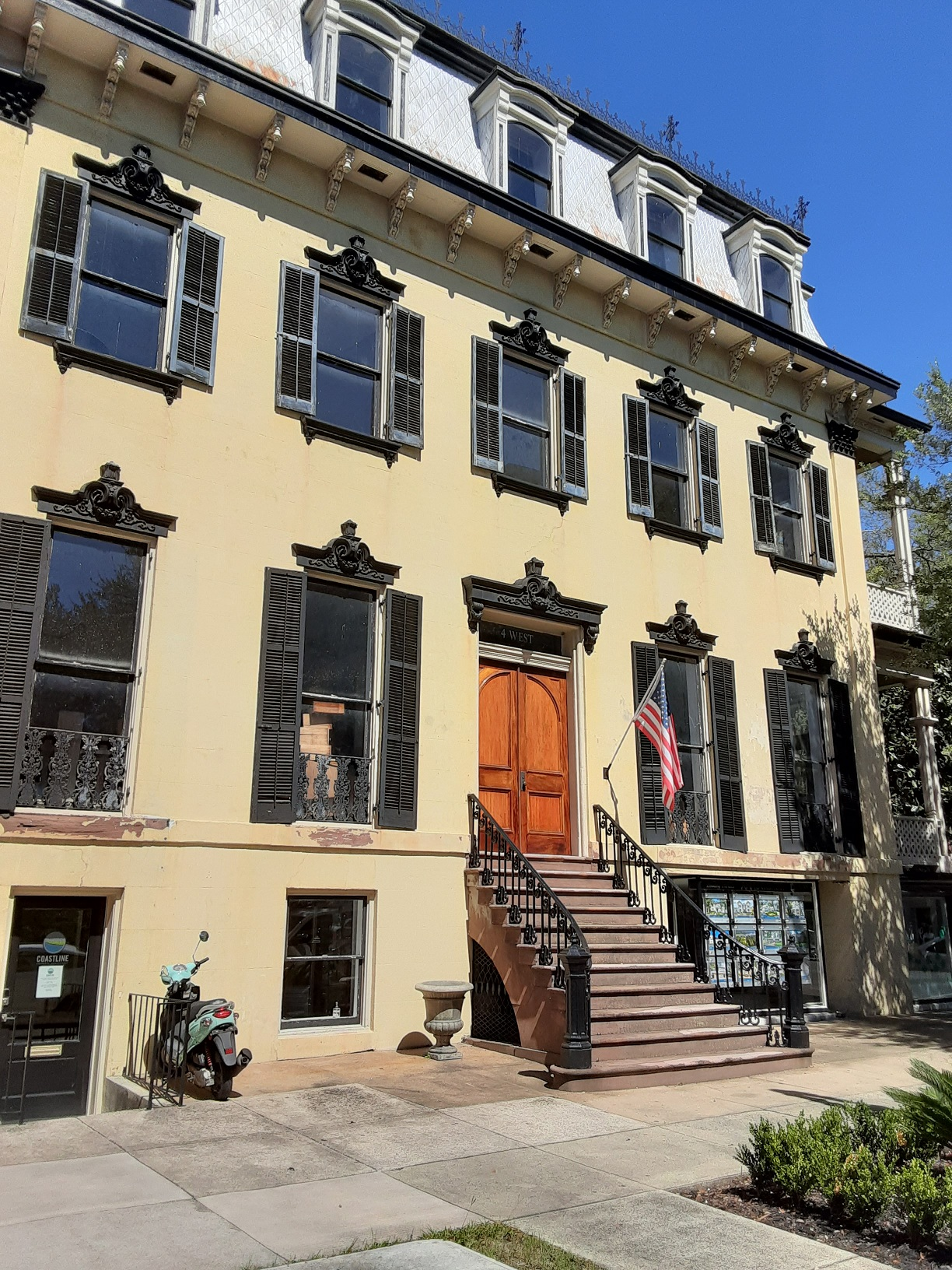
Henry Brigham Building, 4 West Liberty Street

West Liberty Street

- 416 West Liberty Street (1902)
- Lewis Bird House, 201–205 West Liberty Street (1838)
- Stephen B. Williams House Inn, 128 West Liberty Street (1835)
- Solomon Cohen Row House (western portion), 120–124 West Liberty Street (1851)
- Solomon Cohen Row House (eastern portion), 116–118 West Liberty Street (1875)
- Lodiska Richards House, 114 West Liberty Street (1841)
- Charles Groover Duplex, 107–109 West Liberty Street (1871)
- Pierce Condon House, 10 West Liberty Street (1871)
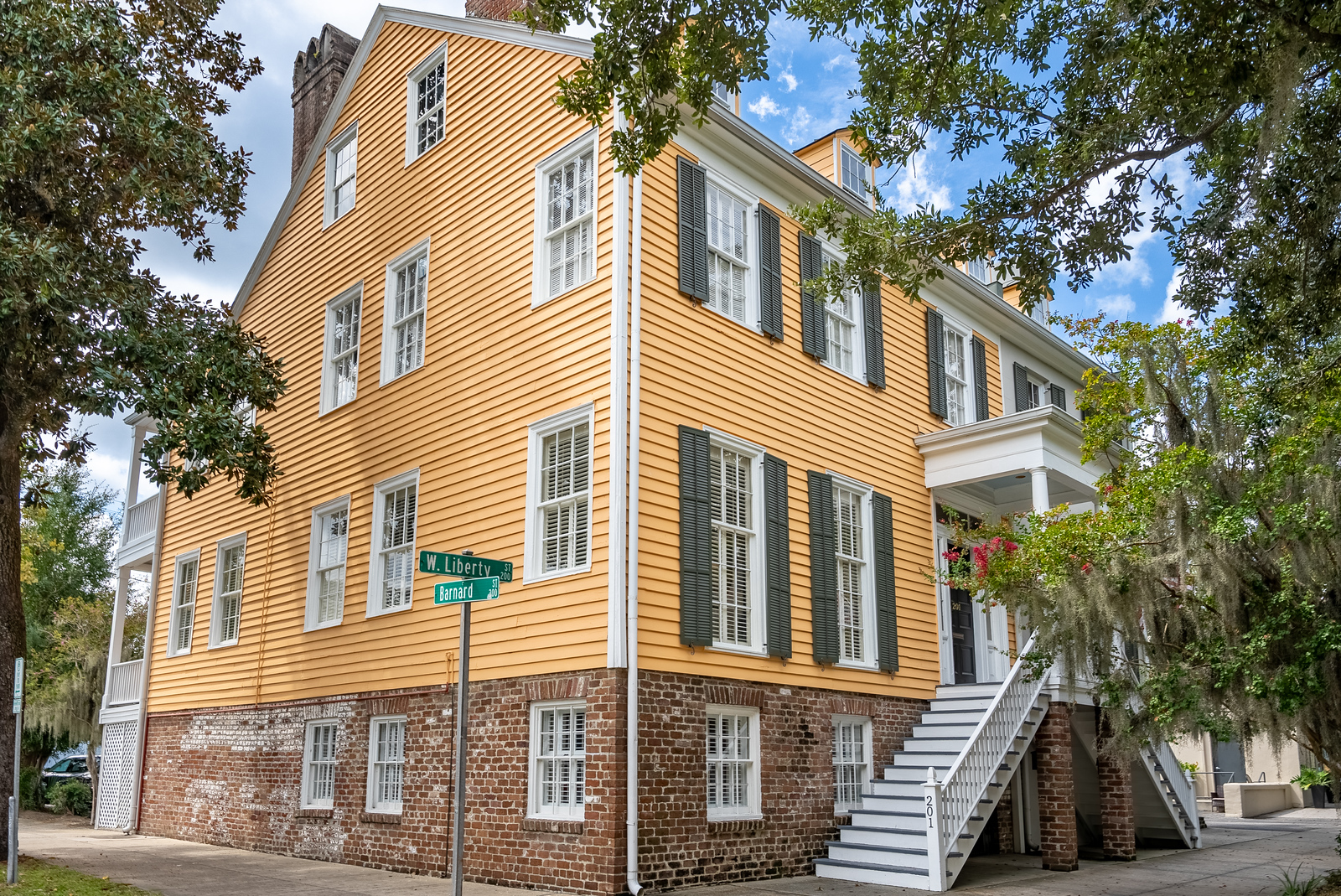
- Lewis Bird House, 201 West Liberty Street
  Henry Brigham Building, 4 West Liberty Street (1879)
- Joseph Fay House, 1–3 West Liberty Street (1849)

East Liberty Street

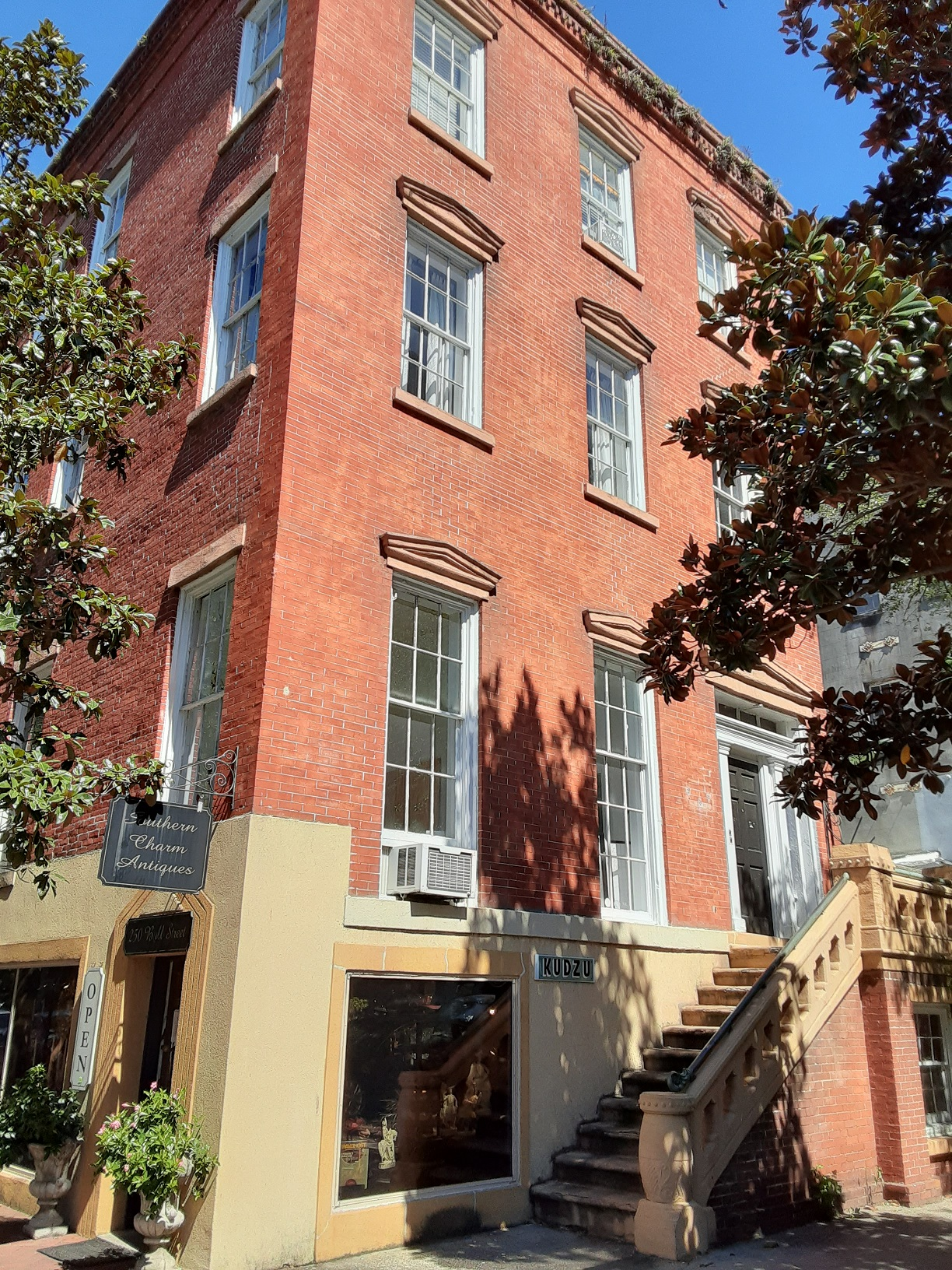
Charles Mills House, 2–4 East Liberty Street at Bull Street

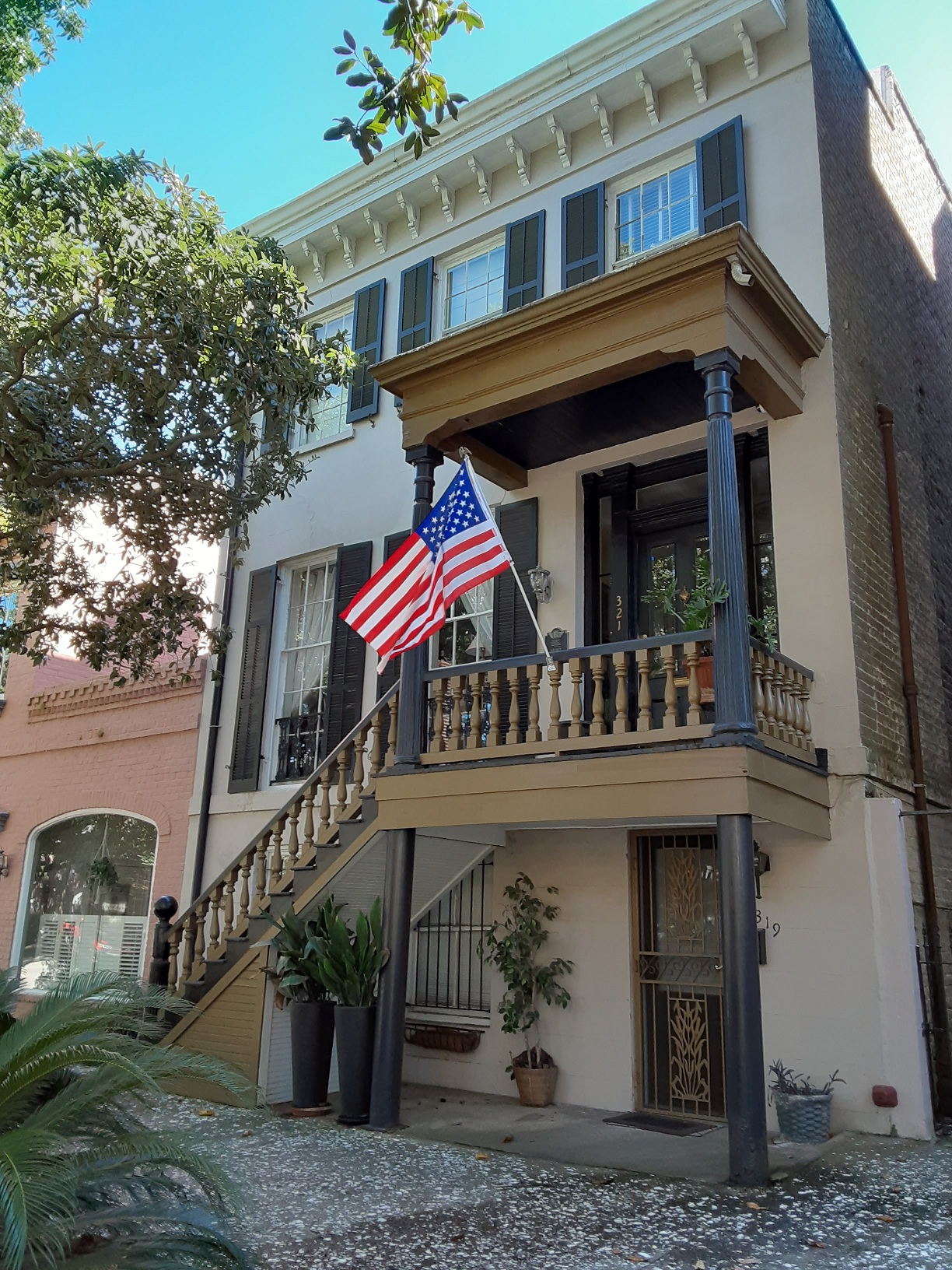
Victoria Barié House, 319–321 East Liberty Street

- Charles Mills House, 2–4 East Liberty Street (1856)
- Drayton Arms Apartments, 102 East Liberty Street (1951; listed on the National Register of Historic Places)
- James J. Joyce Property, 120 East Liberty Street (1884; upper levels added in 1912)
- Jacob Quint Property, 125–129 East Liberty Street (1871)
- Augustus Barié Property (I), 202 East Liberty Street (1869)
- John Hernandez Property (I), 206 East Liberty Street (1870)
- St. Vincent's Academy, 207 East Liberty Street (1845 and 1869)
- John Hernandez Property (II), 208 East Liberty Street (1868)
- Sarah Frierson House, 210 East Liberty Street (1869)
- Laurence Connell Property (I), 212 East Liberty Street (1852; remodeled in 1880)
- Laurence Connell Property (II), 214 East Liberty Street (1852)
- George Willet Duplex, 218–220 East Liberty Street (1850)
- Augustus Barié Property (II), 222–224 East Liberty Street (1859)
- James Skinner House, 303 East Liberty Street (1852)
- Margaret Garrity House, 305–307 East Liberty Street (1893)
- Jane Lama House, 306 East Liberty Street (circa 1870)
- Harriet Dennis House, 308 East Liberty Street (1853; dormers and balcony added in the 1960s)
- George Ash Duplex (western half), 309 East Liberty Street (1853)
- Bernard Goode House, 310 East Liberty Street (1894)
- Thomas Ballentine House, 312 East Liberty Street (1870)
- George Ash Duplex (eastern half), 313 East Liberty Street (1853)
- McDonough–Hamlet Duplex, 315–317 East Liberty Street (1869)
- John Lubs Property, 318–322 East Liberty Street (1895)
- Victoria Barié House, 319–321 East Liberty Street (1868)
- Augustus Barié Property (III), 327 East Liberty Street (1893)
- John Hernandez Property (III), 401 East Liberty Street (1855)
- Nicholas & Mary Jones Row House, 402–412 East Liberty Street (1883)
- John Cercopely House, 405 East Liberty Street (1853)
- John Walz Property, 409 East Liberty Street (1910)
- Avelle Goerz Row House, 414–424 East Liberty Street (1871). The Lady Chablis lived at number 418.
- Cord Asendorf Property, 556 East Liberty Street (251 East Broad Street) (1883)
