= Church of the Holy Faith (Santa Fe) =

Episcopal church in New Mexico, United States

Coordinates: 35°41′12″N 105°55′59″W

The Church of the Holy Faith is an historic Episcopal church located in Santa Fe, New Mexico in the Episcopal Diocese of the Rio Grande. The church reported 906 members in 2016 and 787 members in 2023; no membership statistics were reported in 2024 parochial reports. Plate and pledge income reported for the congregation in 2024 was $996,445. Average Sunday attendance (ASA) in 2024 was 214 persons.

The parish was established in 1863 and is the oldest Episcopal church in New Mexico. Throughout the church's early history, it was a focal point of the emerging Anglo-American influence on a region with strong Spanish cultural and religious traditions. The original Gothic nave was completed in 1882. In the twentieth century, the church's physical footprint grew under two projects led by Santa Fe architect and parishioner John Gaw Meem. Meem designed the church's adjacent parish house, now known as Palen Hall, which was completed in 1926. Towards the end of his career, he expanded the sanctuary, adding a chancel and choir in 1953. Meem's designs maintained the church's original Gothic style and demonstrate his stylistic versatility as an architect who is otherwise known for his Pueblo Revival and Territorial designs. Upon his death, his ashes were interred in a niche within the chancel. The sanctuary features a wooden reredos carved by Gustave Baumann and an organ built by the M.P. Moller Pipe Organ Company.

== Notable parishioners ==
- Gustave Baumann, artist
- Thomas B. Catron, U.S. Senator
- Bronson M. Cutting, U.S. Senator
- The Rev. Charles James Kinsolving, III, rector; later bishop of the Diocese of the Rio Grande
- John Gaw Meem, architect
- L. Bradford Prince, governor of the New Mexico Territory
