= St. Andrew's Episcopal Church (Buffalo, New York) =

Historic church in New York, United States

- U.S. National Register of Historic Places
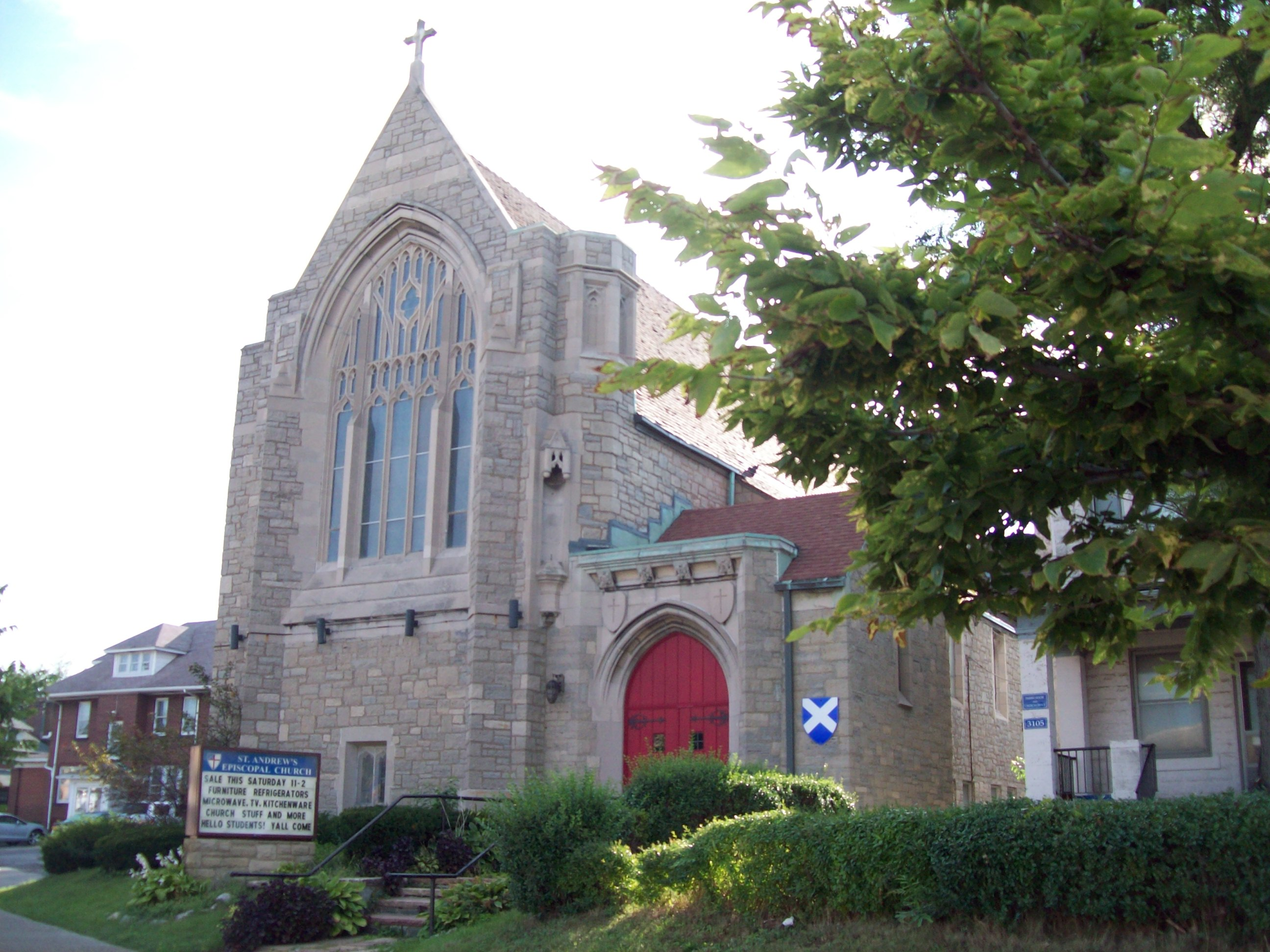
- St. Andrew's Episcopal Church, August 2010

- Location within New York Location within the United States
- Location: 3105 Main St., Buffalo, New York
- Coordinates: 42°50′7″N 78°52′3″W
- Area: 0.9 acres (0.36 ha)
- Built: 1910, 1928
- Architect: North, Robert
- Architectural style: Gothic Revival, Queen Anne
- NRHP reference No.: 10000333
- Added to NRHP: June 9, 2010

St. Andrew's Episcopal Church is a historic Episcopal church complex located at Buffalo in Erie County, New York, United States. The church was completed in 1928 and is a Neo-Gothic style edifice. It is built of cream and gray colored stone with a red ceramic tile roof. Also on the property is a Queen Anne style rectory (1910) and concrete block garage.

It was listed on the National Register of Historic Places in 2010.
