= The Lady Chablis =

American actress, author, and transgender club performer

- The Lady Chablis in 1996
- Born: March 11, 1957; Quincy, Florida, U.S.
- Died: September 8, 2016 (aged 59); Savannah, Georgia, U.S.
- Other names: The Lady Jonel, Brenda Dale Knox
- Occupations: Actress; Author; Club performer

The Lady Chablis (March 11, 1957 – September 8, 2016), also known as The Grand Empress and The Doll, was an American actress, author and transgender club performer. Through exposure in the bestselling nonfiction book Midnight in the Garden of Good and Evil, and its 1997 film adaptation (in which she played herself), she became one of the first trans performers to be introduced to a wide audience.

== Early life ==
Born in 1957, at Gadsden County Memorial Hospital, Chablis grew up in Quincy, Florida, and studied at Quincy Junior High School. Her parents divorced when she was five, and she was supported by her aunt, Katie Bell, and grandmother, Anna Mae Ponder, after her mother, Desia Mae Ponder, moved to Chicago to be a nurse. Chablis did not meet her mother until she was nine, or her father, Benjamin Franklin Knox, until she was 12. Desia Mae had three children, each with different men. Chablis' half-siblings were brothers Jerome and John and sisters Lois and Cynthia. Chablis went on to live with her father in the Harlem neighborhood of New York City in 1969.

She changed her name to "The Lady Chablis" when she was 16 years old and living in Atlanta. "My mom was going to have a baby and she miscarried. The baby's name was going to be La Quinta Chablis and she told me to take the name. I didn't even know what Chablis was."

Chablis' mother moved back to Florida and practiced nursing at Sunland Hospital in Tallahassee. She lived with her mother and her new husband, who owned a dry-cleaning business. Chablis became close to her neighbor, Connie, who offered her a lot of support and a refuge from homophobic troubles at home. Her first mentor was a fellow black girl named Rhonda Conyers, who lived directly across the street.

== Career ==
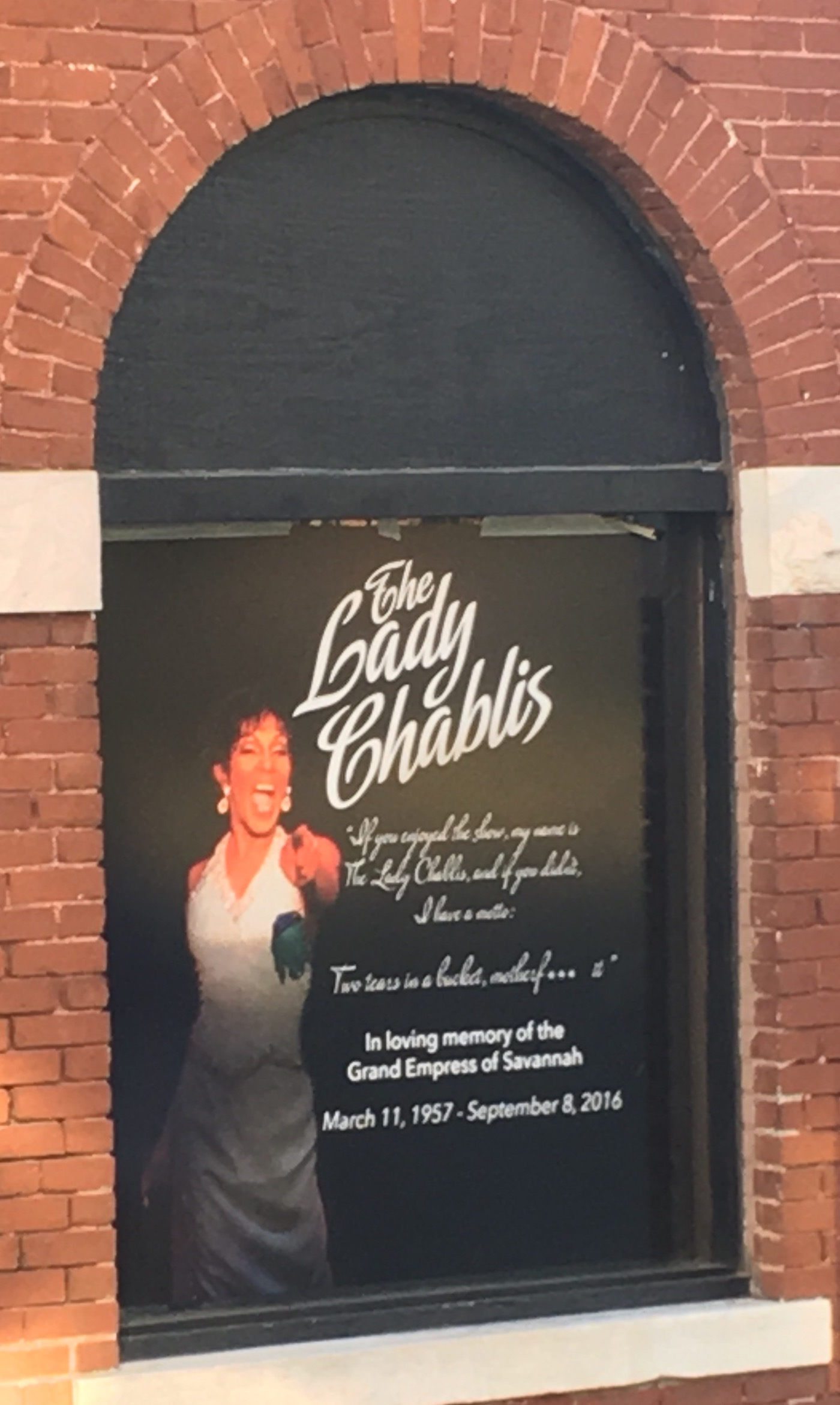
A poster in memoriam of The Lady Chablis on the Jefferson Street wall of Club One. It includes a censored version of her catchphrase, which she uses in Midnight in the Garden of Good and Evil: "Two tears in a bucket, motherfuck it."

Chablis began her career at age 15 in the Fox Trot gay bar in Tallahassee. It was there that she met Cliff Taylor, who performed under the pseudonym of Miss Tina Devore. He was the first male in Quincy that Chablis ever met who dressed up. Taylor offered to have Chablis stay with him if she ever moved to Atlanta. She moved there in 1974 at the age of 17, previously living with her aunt in Tallahassee for about eighteen months.

She began working at the Prince George Inn, a gay-owned restaurant, where she began a relationship with one of her co-workers. She left in 1975 after the relationship ended, and picked up work at Eckerd's Drugstore. After becoming sick for three weeks, she had to leave that position too. A new friend, Linda, saw the decline in Chablis' health and moved her into her two-bedroom apartment. She found another job, this time at a Burlington Coat Factory outlet.

Chablis and Linda moved to Regency Woods apartment complex. Encouraged by her friend's lush life and surroundings, Chablis decided to return to the stage. She eventually found herself at The Locker Room, a bathhouse.

In the late 1980s, a job offer from The Friends Lounge, a cabaret bar in Savannah, Georgia, resulted in her moving south from Atlanta.

She performed at her "home" nightclub, Savannah's Club One, on its opening night in 1988. Known as the "Grand Empress", Chablis was a regular performer there until August 6, 2016, just before she was hospitalized.

In the early 1990s, she moved with her partner, Jesse McCabe, to Columbia, South Carolina, where she began working at a new spot, The Menage. The Menage closed after three years, due to new competition, and Chablis did not find much work for a couple of years.

Chablis returned to Savannah, beginning work at new club, The Edge. She lived on the western side of Crawford Square.

She was a prominent character in John Berendt's best-selling 1994 book Midnight in the Garden of Good and Evil, during her days working at The Pickup, at the corner of Bay Street and Abercorn Street. She left her job in a dispute over pay.

Chablis traveled the U.S. performing her show, The Doll Revue, at various venues and special events, such as gay pride gatherings. She also appeared on radio shows.

Chablis' autobiography Hiding My Candy: The Autobiography of the Grand Empress of Savannah was published by Pocket Books in 1996, a year before she played herself in the Clint Eastwood-directed movie adaptation of Midnight in the Garden of Good and Evil, starring Kevin Spacey and John Cusack. The book was co-written by Theodore Bouloukos, and its introduction was written by John Berendt. It was dedicated to Auntie Katie Bell, who died the year book was published, and Miss Tina Devore.

The Lady Chablis was featured in the closing segment of the Savannah episode of Bizarre Foods America on The Travel Channel. She joined host Andrew Zimmern at several Savannah restaurants, including Elizabeth on 37th. In 2012, she was interviewed in Savannah on the local television and internet talk show MAMA Knows Best (season 2, episode 1). On April 19, 2013, Chablis performed for the grand opening of the short-lived Mama's Cabaret in Lewiston, Maine, with "MAMA" Savannah Georgia.

=== Awards and titles ===
In her early career as an entertainer, under the name Brenda Dale Knox, she won multiple titles in drag pageantry, including:

- Miss Dixieland, 1976
- Miss Gay World, 1976
- The Grand Empress of Savannah, 1977
- Miss Sweetheart International, 1989
- Empress of Atlanta, 1996
- Miss Cosmo USA, 1997
- Miss Garden City, 1997
- Miss Atlanta Universe, 1998
- Miss Georgia National, 1998
- Miss Southern States USA, 1998

=== Autobiography ===
- Lady Chablis (1996). Hiding My Candy: The Autobiography of the Grand Empress of Savannah. Pocket Books. ISBN 0-671-52095-4. OCLC 37901705.

=== Filmography ===
- This Old House: The Savannah House Part 4 (1996) as Herself
- Midnight in the Garden of Good and Evil (1997) as Chablis Deveau (credited as Lady Chablis)
- Midnight in Savannah (1997, TV documentary) as Herself
- Partners (1999, TV movie) as Beverly
- Damn Good Dog (2004, video documentary) as Herself
- Bizarre Foods America: Savannah (2012) as Herself
- Real Housewives of Atlanta (2013) as Herself

== Personal life ==
Chablis said she did not want any label except her name, "The Lady Chablis", and said she found it hurtful when people called her a "drag queen". In his book, Berendt wrote that he met Chablis as she was returning home from having a hormone injection. In her book Hiding My Candy, Chablis said she had not undergone sex reassignment surgery.

== Death ==
The Lady Chablis died in 2016 from Pneumocystis pneumonia, aged 59, following a month-long stay at Savannah's Candler Hospital.

On November 5, a special screening of Midnight in the Garden of Good and Evil was shown at Savannah's Lucas Theatre for the Arts, with a tribute to Chablis beforehand. A few of Chablis' gowns were on display in the theatre's lobby. Jerry Spence, the former hairdresser who appeared in both the book and movie, was in attendance. A reception was held at Club One after the memorial service and, after the movie screening, Club One Cabaret held two Lady Chablis tribute shows.

=== Tributes ===
Upon news of her death, several of Chablis' former co-stars made tributes to her. Paul Hipp, alongside whom she appeared in the movie adaptation of Midnight in the Garden, said: "So sad to hear of The Lady Chablis' passing. She was super talented, kind, and laugh out loud funny. She was a true transgender pioneer, way ahead of her time (in the Deep South, no less)." Chablis was impersonated on the second episode of Season 7 of RuPaul's Drag Race All Stars by drag queen Jaida Essence Hall.
