= St. Mary's Episcopal Church (Phoenix) =

Church in Arizona

Coordinates: 33.532002°N 112.14228°W

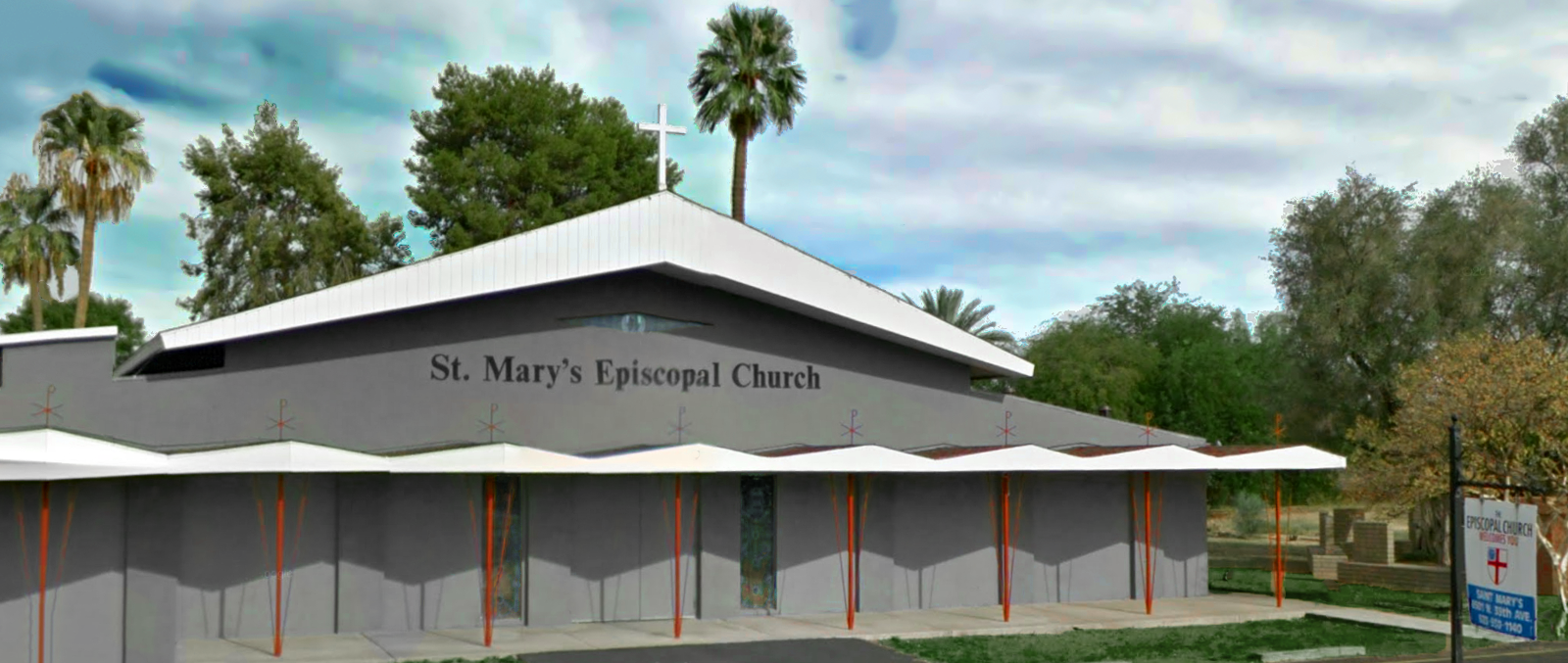
St. Mary's Episcopal Church (Phoenix)

St. Mary's Episcopal Church is an Episcopal parish in Phoenix, Arizona, in the Episcopal Diocese of Arizona. The parish church is located at 39th Avenue and Maryland between the historic Maryvale and Alhambra districts. The church reported 165 members in 2016 and 130 members in 2023; no membership statistics were reported in 2024 parochial reports. Plate and pledge income reported for the congregation in 2024 was $177,142 with average Sunday attendance (ASA) of 51 persons. This was a relative decrease from ASA of 75 reported in 2018.

== History ==
St. Mary's church was founded by Episcopalians seeking to establish an Anglo-Catholic community in the Diocese of Arizona. The first Mass was celebrated on the Feast of Christ the King, October 28, 1956, in a Phoenix storefront. Several supply priests served the growing mission parish until the first vicar, the Reverend Rodney Cobb, arrived in December 1957. By 1958, the church had reached 150 parishioners and had purchased farmland property to provide ecclesiastical, office, and school facilities.

In 1959, the Reverend Lewis H. Long arrived from Abilene, Kansas. Under his leadership, the mission entered a period of growth and became a full parish in 1961. A five-acre site was purchased at 39th Avenue and Maryland. In June 1964, ground was broken for the new St. Mary's church building. The first Mass was said in December 1964, with a dedication in Spring 1965.

The Close and Memorial Garden were created in 1980. St. Mary's Manor, an adjacent retirement facility, opened in April 1993 and accommodates forty people in individual apartments.

After Fr. Long's retirement in 1993, the Reverend Derrick Wedderburn was served as Interim Rector until January 1995, when the Reverend Robert Nagy was named Vicar. The Reverend William C. Rhodes became the second rector of St. Mary's in July 1999, renovating the building and retiring in 2003. The Reverend Paulette Schiff served as interim rector, until Fr. Rhodes returned as parish priest in 2005. In 2010, the Reverend R. Craig Bustrin became the vicar (and later Rector) of St. Mary's, a position he held until his retirement in 2025.

On August 2, 2014, an accidental structural fire in the Hispanic Ministries office destroyed or damaged many parts of the building and forced the congregation outside. Sunday Mass was said outdoors until the congregation re-entered the building 42 weeks later on June 21, 2015.

St. Mary's current Rector is the Rev. Samantha Iversen-Suárez.

== Music and arts ==
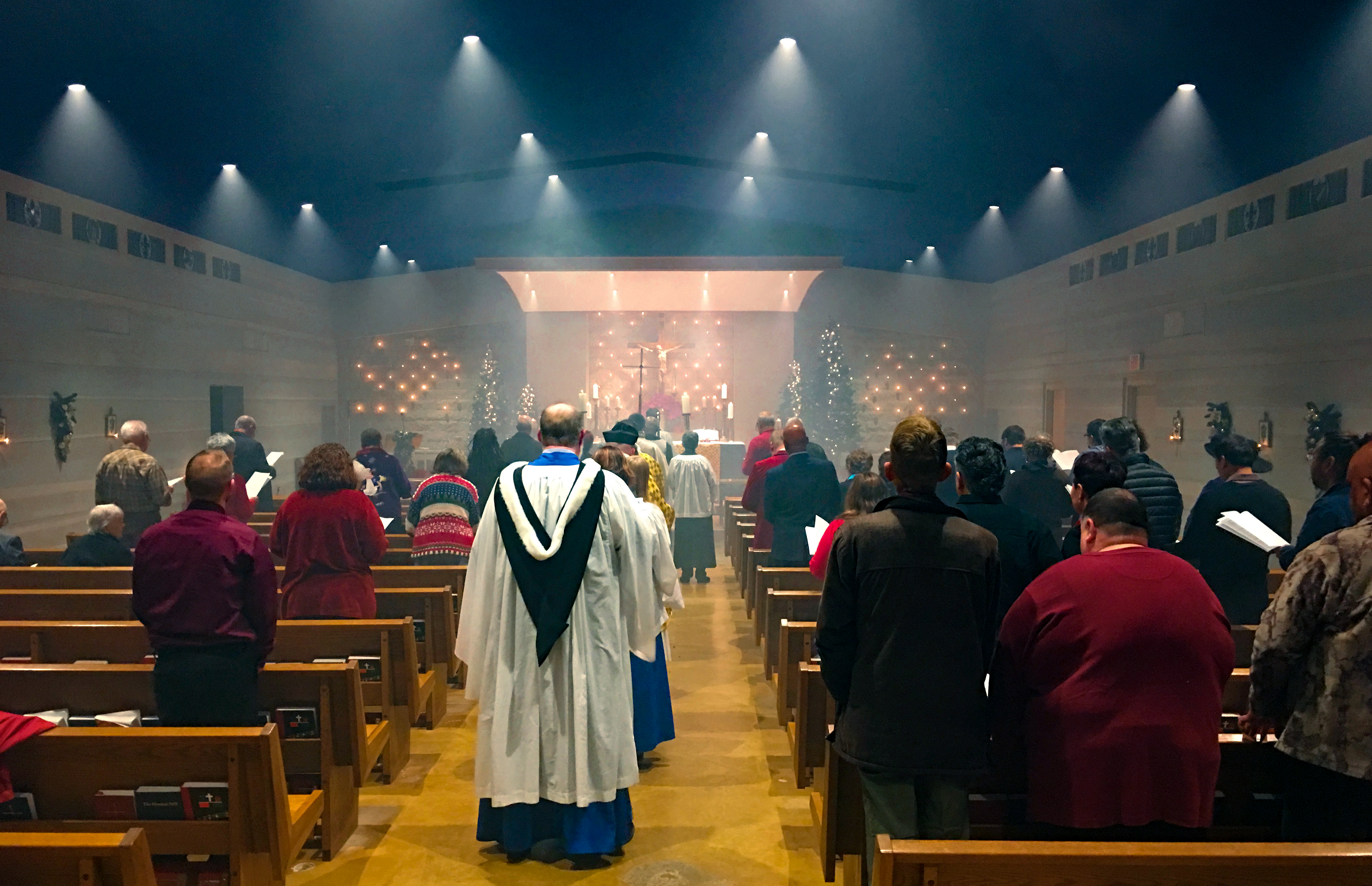
A Christmas Eve procession with choir and incense from midnight Mass in 2016.

St. Mary's is known for its Anglo-Catholic liturgy, with a Solemn Mass celebrated every Sunday. The altar crucifix was hand-carved in Oberammergau, Germany, and the church bell is from El Buen Samaritano, after that mission closed its doors in 1960.
