= Jefferson Street (Savannah, Georgia) =

Prominent street in Savannah, Georgia

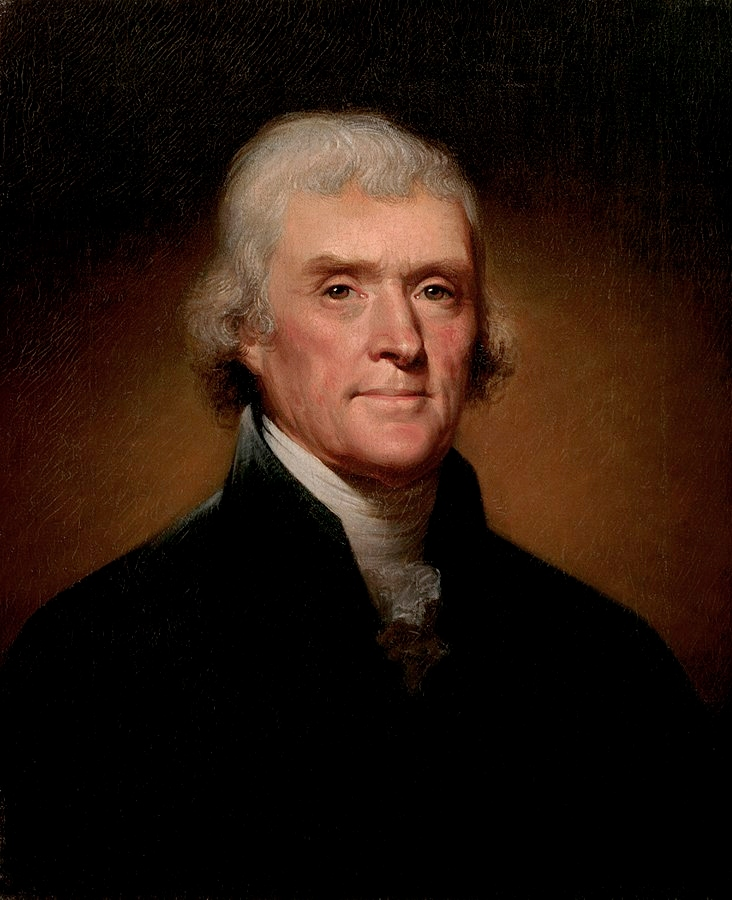
- The street's namesake, Thomas Jefferson
- Namesake: Thomas Jefferson
- Length: 2.0 mi (3.2 km)
- Location: Savannah, Georgia, U.S.
- North end: West Bay Street
- South end: West 42nd Street

Jefferson Street is a prominent street in Savannah, Georgia, United States. Located between Montgomery Street to the west and Barnard Street to the east, it runs for about 2 miles (3.2 km) from West Bay Street in the north to West 42nd Street in the south. Its course was interrupted by around 0.14 miles (0.23 km) (between West Oglethorpe Avenue and West Liberty Street) by the construction of the Savannah Civic Center in 1974. The street is named for Thomas Jefferson, third president of the United States. Its northern section passes through the Savannah Historic District, a National Historic Landmark District.

Jefferson Street runs beside six squares. From north to south:

To the west of

- Ellis Square
- Telfair Square
- Orleans Square
- Pulaski Square
- Chatham Square

To the east of

- Franklin Square

== Notable buildings and structures ==
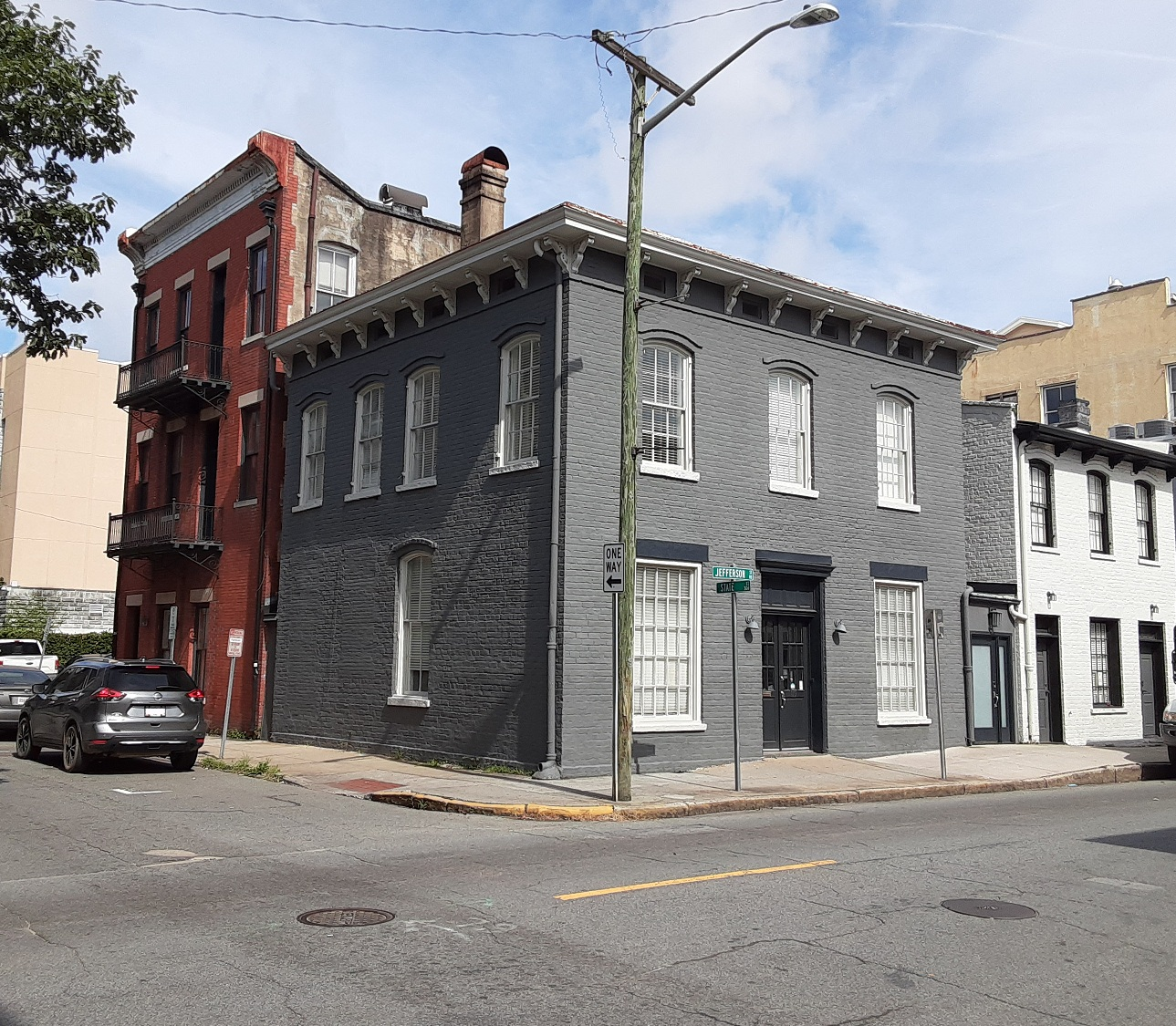
Anna Keilbach Building, 119 Jefferson Street, built in 1883

Below is a selection of notable buildings and structures on Jefferson Street, all in Savannah's Historic District. From north to south:

- George Wymberly Jones DeRenne (Estate of) Property, 1 Jefferson Street (1893), designed by Percy Sugden
- 109–111 Jefferson Street (1909)
- Anna Keilbach Building (north), 113–115 Jefferson Street (1883)
- Anna Keilbach Building (south), 117–119 Jefferson Street (1883)
- Julia Dancy Range, 134–142 Jefferson Street (1884)
- St. Philip Monumental AME Church, 1112 Jefferson Street (1911)

Club 1, at 1 Jefferson Street, is a gay nightclub where The Lady Chablis worked.
