= William Kehoe (businessman) =

American businessman (1842–1929)

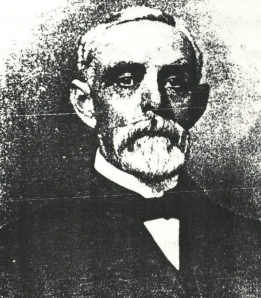
- Kehoe around 1920
- Born: August 21, 1842; Wexford, County Wexford, Ireland
- Died: December 29, 1929 (aged 87); Savannah, Georgia, U.S.
- Occupation: Businessman

William Kehoe (August 21, 1842 – December 29, 1929) was an Irish businessman who emigrated to Savannah, Georgia, where he became a successful iron founder. The Kehoe Iron Works is now named for him.

== Life and career ==
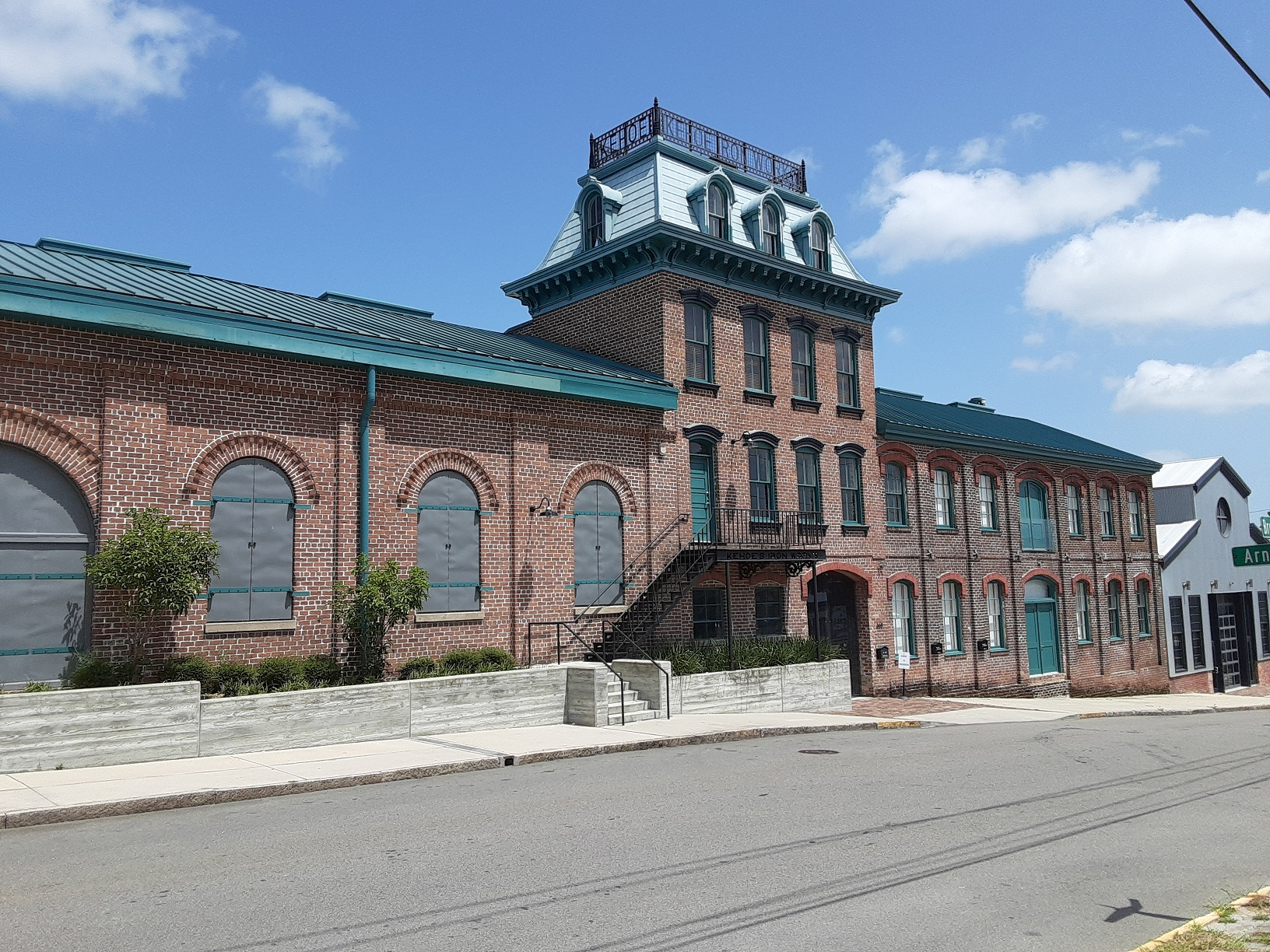
Kehoe's foundry, at today's 660 East Broughton Street, built in 1873

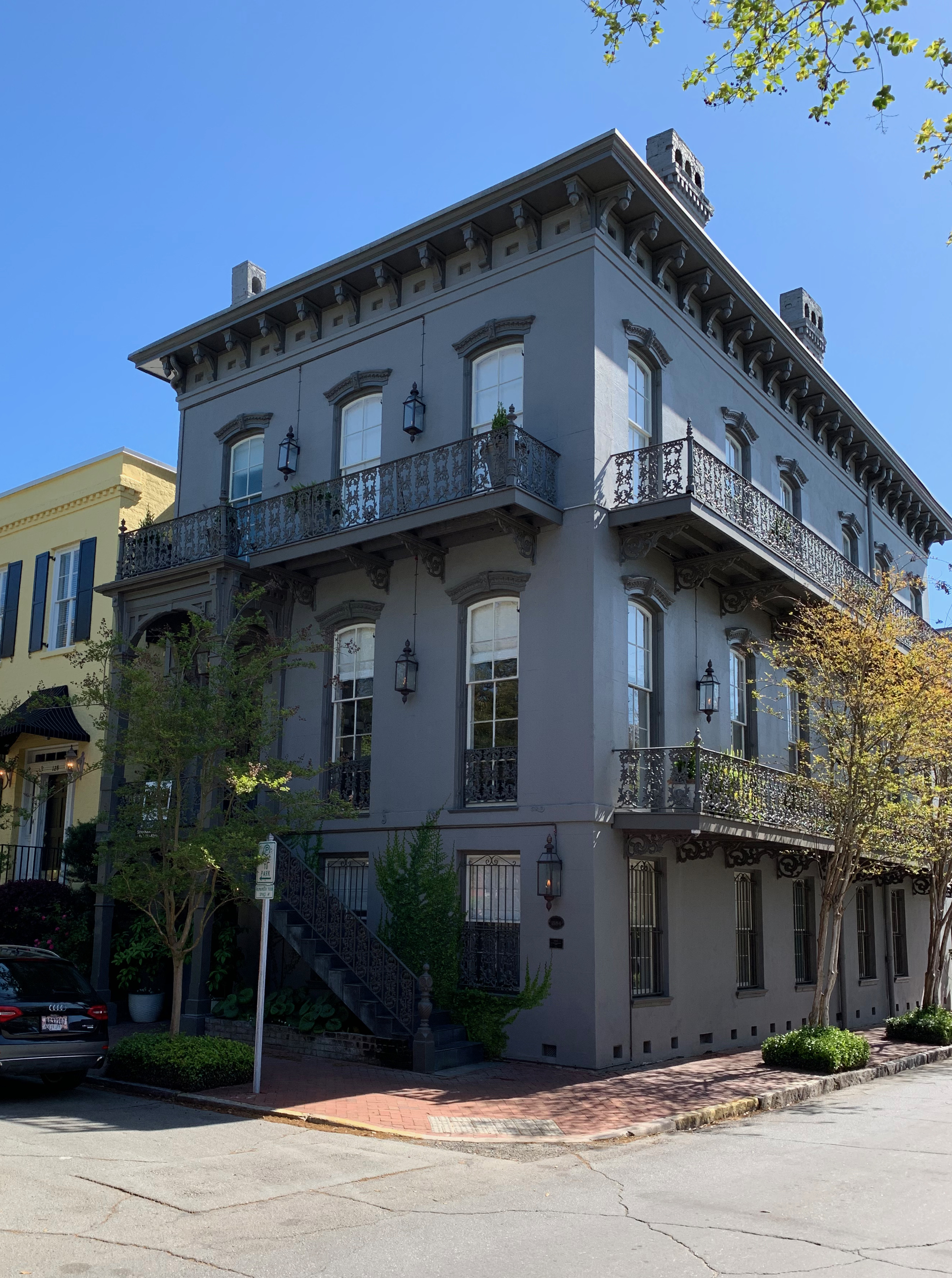
130 Habersham Street, the first of Kehoe's two homes in Savannah's Columbia Square

Kehoe was born on August 21, 1842, in Wexford, County Wexford, Ireland, to Daniel Kehoe and Johanna Rath. He was one of seven children, including another son, Patrick, who was born in 1830. His family emigrated to the United States in 1851, arriving in Savannah, Georgia, on February 28, and settling in the Old Fort neighborhood, an Irish enclave in the city. His father died, at the age of 51 or 52, shortly after their arrival, during a yellow fever epidemic.

During the Civil War, Kehoe made bullets in Selma, Alabama, for the Confederate Army. After returning to Savannah, he learned the trade of an iron molder. He began working for Savannah Machine and Boiler Works.

On November 26, 1868, seven months after the death of his mother, he married Savannah native Anne Flood, with whom he had ten children. A daughter, Annie, died in infancy in 1876. He gave his son Francis the middle name "Parnell", after pro-tenant Irish National Land League leader John Howard Parnell.

By 1873, a foundry now known as Phoenix Iron Works had been built at today's 660 East Broughton Street, in the Trustees' Garden, in Savannah. It was owned by James Monahan, who had left Savannah Machine and Boiler Works to start out on his own. He brought Kehoe and John Rourke with him. Four years later, Monahan sold the foundry to Thomas Mulligan and set up a new location, a few hundred feet away, called Phoenix Architectural Works. Kehoe was a foreman there by 1877.

In 1879, Kehoe and Ellen Monahan, widow of James, were made co-owners of the business. Kehoe bought Monahan's share of the business the following year and renamed it Kehoe Iron Works. Around a decade later, the property was purchased by the Savannah Gas Company, and Kehoe moved to a new building on the Savannah River. He passed the iron works business to his sons Simon and William. Kehoe was listed as its chairman in 1912.

Over the next fifty years, Kehoe grew one of the best-equipped marine engineering stores on the South Atlantic coast.

He was also a founder of the Chatham Savings and Loan Company, and was its president at the time of his death. He was also a director of the National Bank of Savannah and Savannah Electric and Power Company, a founder of the Tybee Railroad and was a member of the Tybee Island's town council for 25 years. He was on the Board of Commissioners of Chatham County between 1893 and 1898.

Among his many benevolent and religious affiliations, he was a member of the Georgia Historical Society.

In 1885, Kehoe had built a home at 130 Habersham Street in Savannah's Columbia Square. Seven years later, after both his business and family expanded, he built another home, known as the Kehoe House, diagonally across the square, into which he and his family moved upon its completion in 1892. The latter property is now a 13-room inn, and is one of three "Historic Inns of Savannah," the other two being The Gastonian, on East Gaston Street, and the Eliza Thompson House Bed and Breakfast, on West Jones Street.

The inn is owned by Savannah's HLC Hotels, Inc., which also owns the city's Olde Harbour Inn, the Eliza Thompson House, the East Bay Inn and The Gastonian.

Kehoe sold the family home after the death of his wife in 1920 and moved to East 36th Street.

== Death ==
Kehoe died of pneumonia on December 29, 1929, in Savannah. He was 87. He was one of the city's oldest residents at the time of his death, and was survived by seven of his children.

His funeral was held at the Cathedral of St. John the Baptist, of which he was a member. He is interred in Savannah's Catholic Cemetery, on Wheaton Street, with almost all of his family. (It is not known where infant Annie was buried, and Kehoe's son, Daniel, was interred in Savannah's Greenwich Cemetery upon his death in 1954.)
