= Kehoe House =

Building in Savannah, Georgia, built in 1892

- The building in 2016
- Interactive map of the Kehoe House area

General information
- Architectural style: Renaissance Revival
- Location: Savannah, Georgia, U.S., 123 Habersham Street
- Coordinates: 32°04′38″N 81°05′18″W
- Completed: 1892; 134 years ago
- Owner: Savannah's HLC Hotels, Inc.

Technical details
- Floor count: 4

Design and construction
- Architect: Andrew DeWitt Bruyn

Kehoe House is a historic building in the American city of Savannah, Georgia. It is located in the northwestern civic block of Columbia Square and was built in 1892. It is part of the Savannah Historic District.

The home was built for Irish immigrant William Kehoe, owner of Kehoe Iron Founder, his second home on the square, after 130 Habersham Street, built in 1885 and now known as the William J. Kehoe House. After both his business and his family expanded, he built this larger home diagonally across the square.

Now a 13-room inn, it is one of three "Historic Inns of Savannah," the other two being The Gastonian, at 220 East Gaston Street, and the Eliza Thompson House Bed and Breakfast, at 5 West Jones Street.

The inn is owned by Savannah's HLC Hotels, Inc., which also owns the city's Olde Harbour Inn, the Eliza Thompson House, the East Bay Inn and The Gastonian.

The stairways, window treatments, columns, fences and gates on and around the building are all made of cast iron, not wood.
