= Broughton Street =

Prominent street in Savannah, Georgia

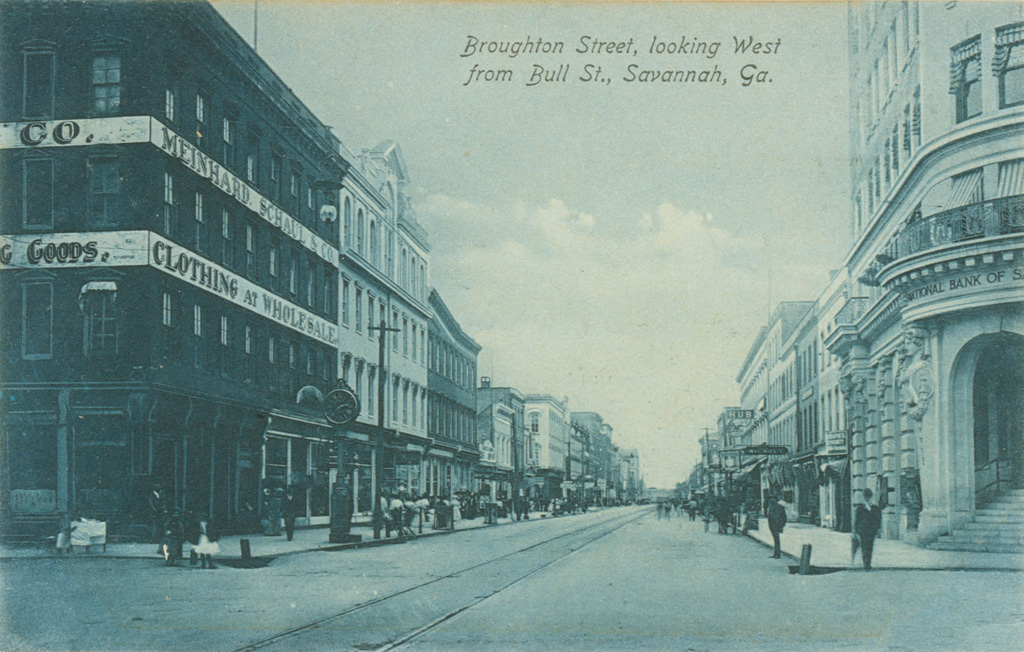
- Looking west along Broughton Street from its Bull Street intersection, mid-20th century
- Namesake: Thomas Broughton
- Length: 0.75 mi (1.21 km)
- Location: Savannah, Georgia, U.S.
- West end: Martin Luther King Jr. Boulevard
- East end: East Broad Street

Broughton Street is a prominent street in Savannah, Georgia, United States. Located between Congress Street to the north and State Street to the south, it runs for about 0.75 miles (1.21 km) from Martin Luther King Jr. Boulevard in the west to East Broad Street in the east. Originally known only as Broughton Street singular, its addresses are now split between "West Broughton Street" and "East Broughton Street", the transition occurring at Bull Street in the center of the downtown area. Broughton Street is named for Thomas Broughton, lieutenant-governor of South Carolina.

In the year following the release of John Berendt's 1994 book Midnight in the Garden of Good and Evil, nineteen businesses opened on Broughton Street, creating over 200 jobs.

The street is entirely within Savannah Historic District, a National Historic Landmark District.

Broughton Street runs between eleven squares. From west to east:

To the south of

- Franklin Square
- Ellis Square
- Johnson Square
- Reynolds Square
- Warren Square
- Washington Square

To the north of

- Telfair Square
- Wright Square
- Oglethorpe Square
- Columbia Square
- Greene Square

== Notable buildings and structures ==
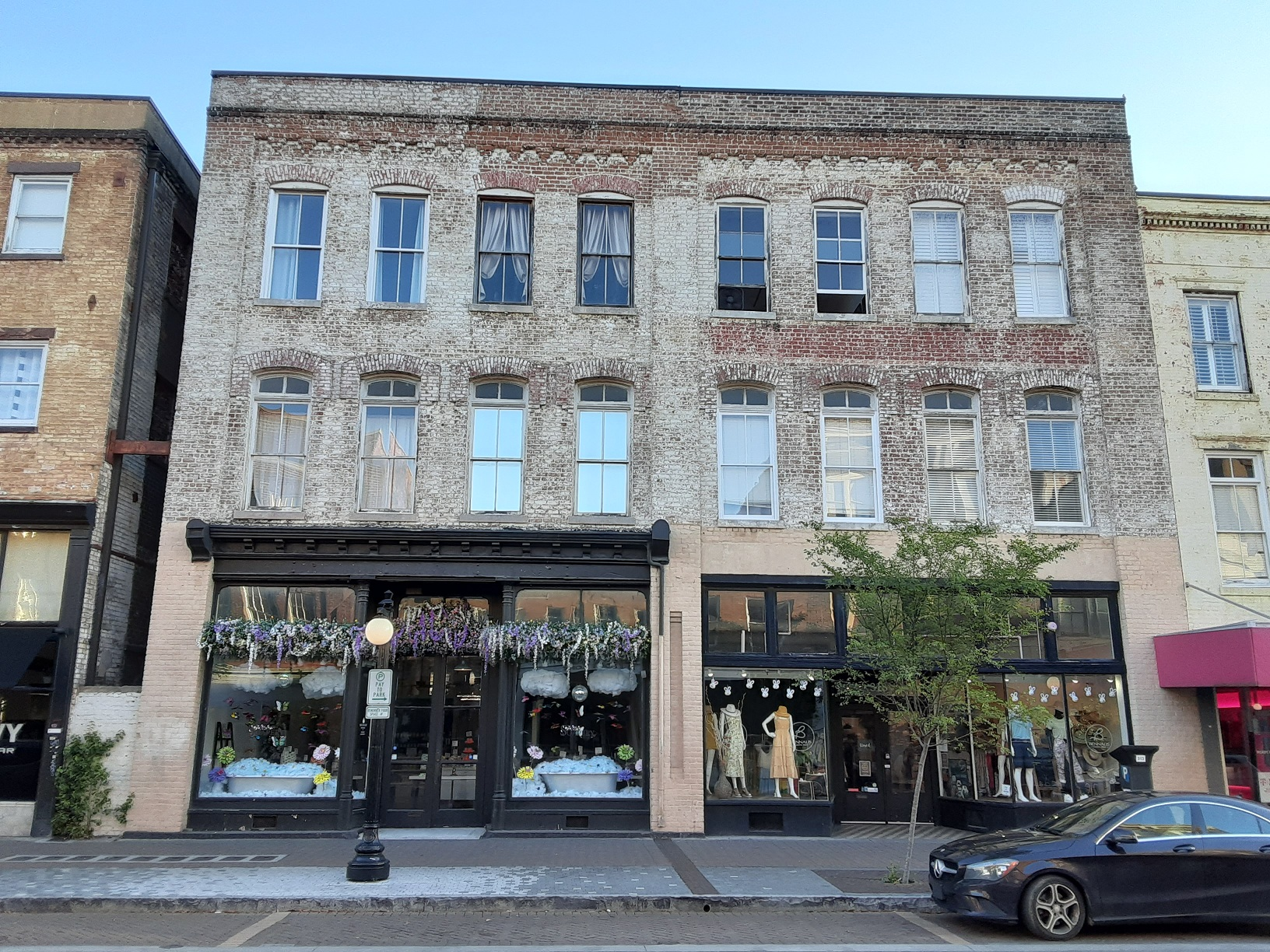
Edward & Robert Lovell Building, 318–320 West Broughton Street

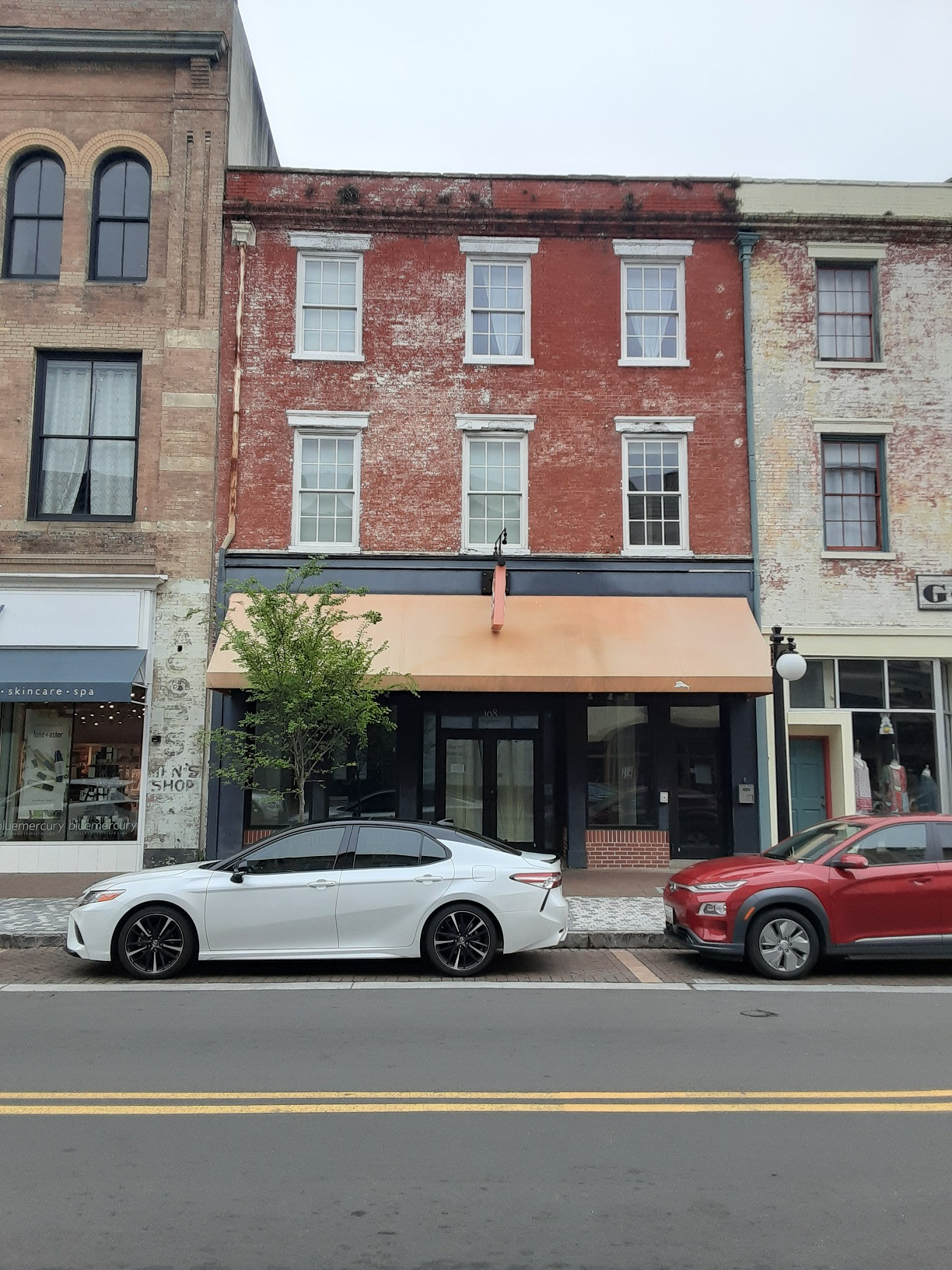
108 West Broughton Street, the western end of the Alexander Smets Range

Below is a selection of notable buildings and structures on Broughton Street, all in Savannah's Historic District. From west to east:

West Broughton Street

- Margaret Downs Property, 420 West Broughton Street (1904)
- Charles Ochler Property, 416–418 West Broughton Street (1872)
- Simon Byck Property, 408 West Broughton Street (1869)
- Edward & Robert Lovell Building, 318–320 West Broughton Street (1891)
- 311 West Broughton Street (1916)
- 301–303 West Broughton Street (1851)
- Levy & Golden Building, 220–222 West Broughton Street (1905)
- David Morrison Building, 212–218 West Broughton Street (1905)
- 205–207 West Broughton Street (1889)
- Willenski & Silver Building, 202–206 West Broughton Street (1903)
- 201 West Broughton Street (1900)
- Hogan & Douglas Building, 123–125 West Broughton Street (1889)
- 121 West Broughton Street (1889)
- Kress Building, 120–122 West Broughton Street (1875)
- 110 West Broughton Street (1875)
- Edward Lovell Building, 109–115 West Broughton Street (c. 1875 for 109–113; 1890 for 115)
- Alexander Smets Range, 102–108 West Broughton Street (1847–1853)
- Jacob Waldburg Building, 101–105 West Broughton Street (1866)
- John Lyons Building, 30–36 West Broughton Street (1878)
- 11–15 West Broughton Street (1867)

East Broughton Street

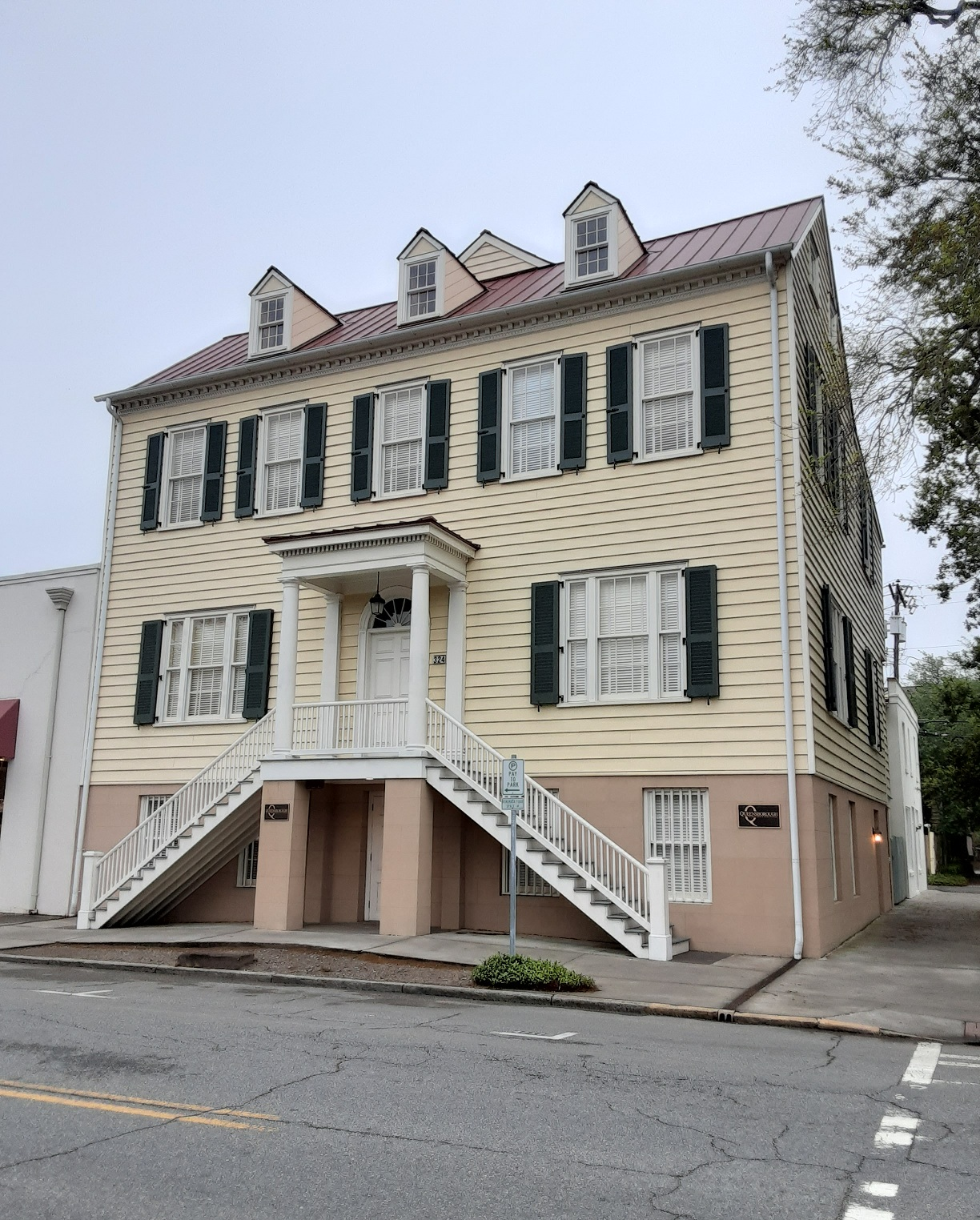
John Berrien House, 322–324 East Broughton Street

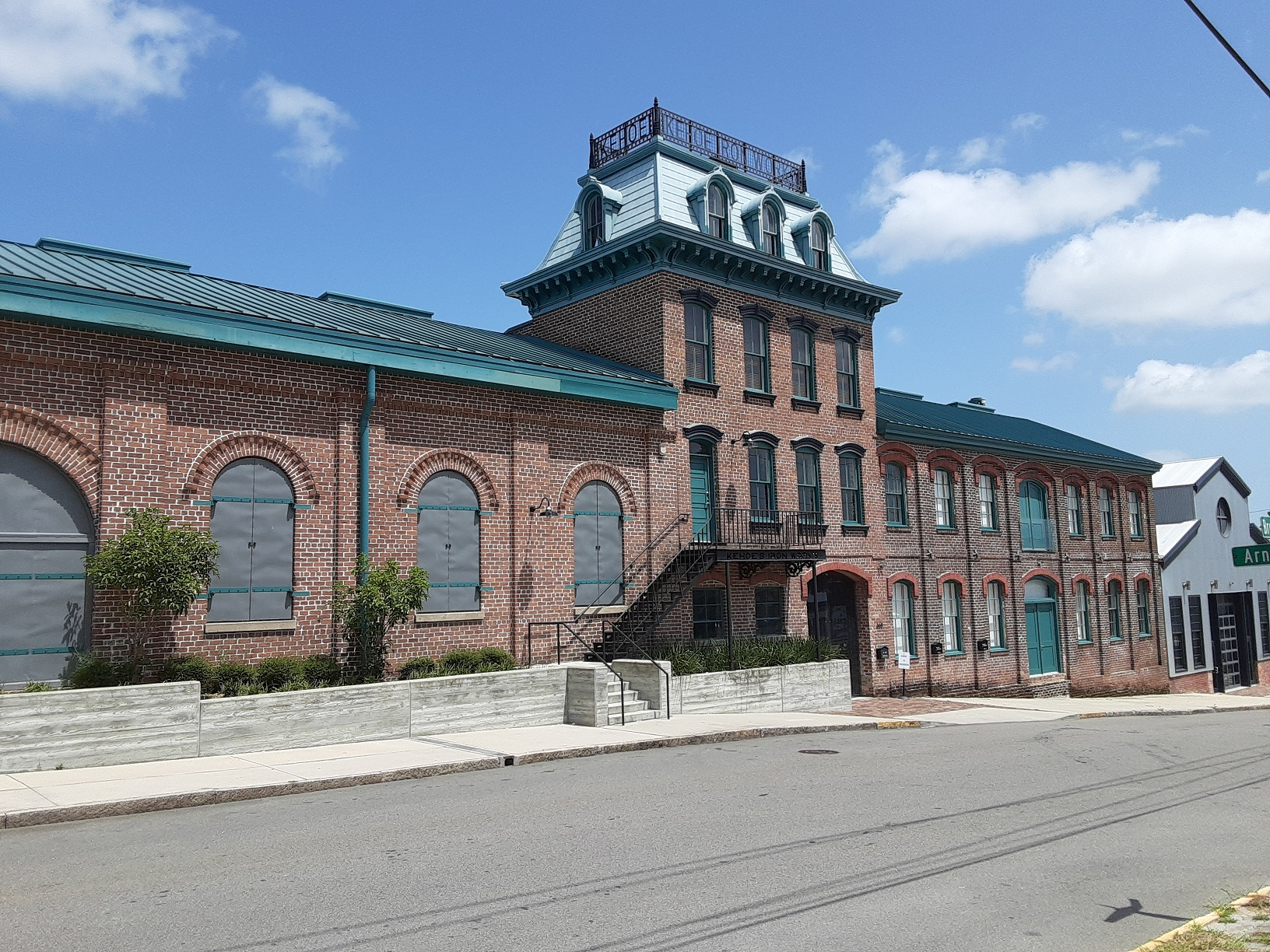
Phoenix Iron Works, 656 East Broughton Street

- The Marshall House, 123 East Broughton Street (1852)
- Avon Theatre, 125 East Broughton Street (1946)
- 202–208 East Broughton Street (1917)
- Leopold's Ice Cream, 212 East Broughton Street
- John Berrien House, 322–324 East Broughton Street (1790–1797)
- Robert Kennedy Property, 323 East Broughton Street (1890)
- Humphrey Gwathney House, 401 East Broughton Street (1823)
- John Deubell House, 410–416 East Broughton Street (1809 or before)
- Patrick Shiels Property, 417–421 East Broughton Street (1843)
- William Lake Building, 418 East Broughton Street (1871)
- John Entelman Property, 420–422 East Broughton Street (1898)
- Frank Walsh House, 506 East Broughton Street (1887)
- Daniel O'Connor Row House, 507–511 East Broughton Street (1883)
- Bridget McAuliffe House, 508 East Broughton Street (1989)
- 530 East Broughton Street (1884)
- Mary Spear House, 532 East Broughton Street (c. 1820)
- Abrahams Home, 548 East Broughton Street (1858; designed by John S. Norris)
- Phoenix Iron Works/Kehoe Iron Foundry, 656 East Broughton Street (1873)

In the late 19th century, Leopold Adler established Adler's department store on Broughton Street, at Bull Street.
