= Alexander Smets =

Co-founder of the Georgia Historical Society

- Pictured around 1860
- Born: Alexander Augustus Smets; October 12, 1795; Nantes, France
- Died: May 9, 1862 (aged 66); Indian Springs, Georgia, U.S.
- Resting place: Bonaventure Cemetery, Savannah, Georgia, U.S.
- Occupations: Philanthropist, banker
- Spouse: Anne Watt (1820–1854; her death)

Alexander Augustus Smets (October 12, 1795 – May 9, 1862) was a French-born co-founder of the Georgia Historical Society in Savannah, Georgia, United States. A banker and philanthropist, he was also a large landowner in Georgia and one of the state's wealthiest people.

== Life and career ==
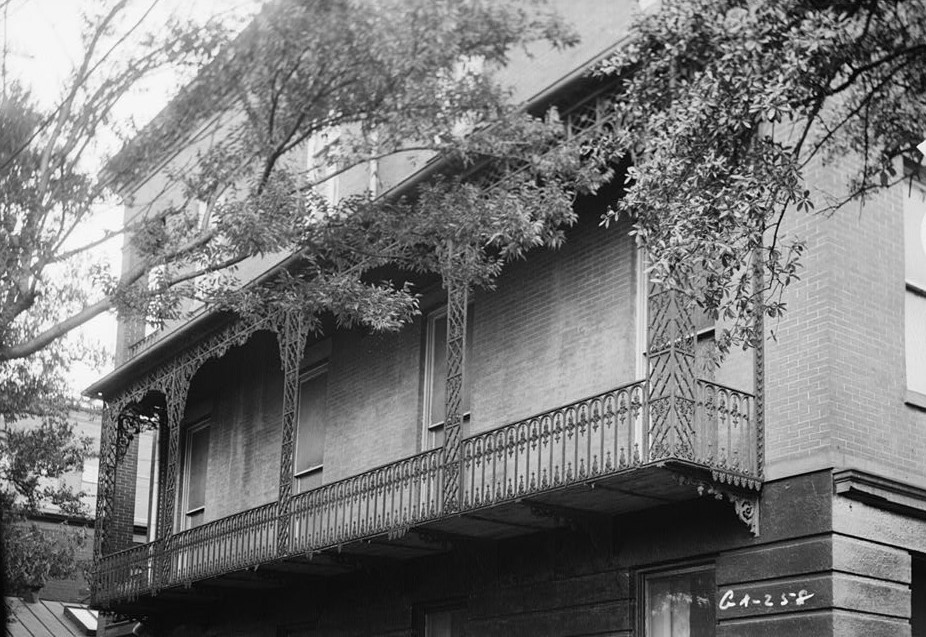
Smets' former home, built in 1853 at 2–4 East Jones Street

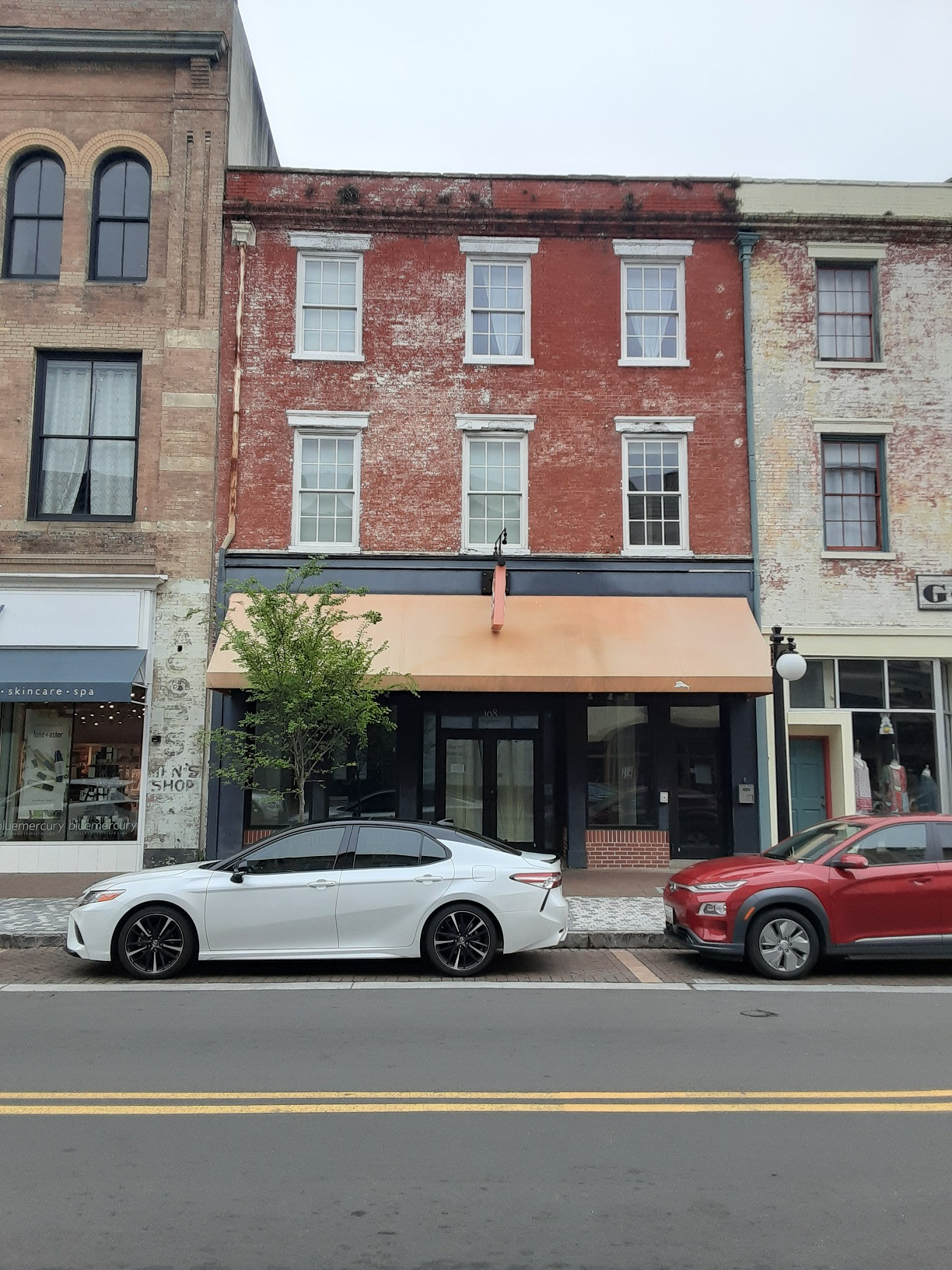
108 West Broughton Street in Savannah, Georgia, part of today's Alexander Smets Range

Smets was born in 1795, in Nantes, France, the son of Barthelemy Martin Smets, a native of Mechelen, Belgium, and Jean Marie Antoinette.

At the age of eighteen, he was enlisted in the French Army and was stationed at La Rochelle. He was promoted to lieutenant, such was his dedication to the role he was initially given, but the war ended before he could serve in the role.

Smets' friend, Charles Maurel, a merchant in Savannah, Georgia, persuaded him to return to the United States with him during a visit to France. Smets arrived in Savannah on November 20, 1816.

His early career was not entirely notable; a partnership formed shortly after his arrival in Savannah was dissolved, after which he moved into the lumber trade on his own. He was successful, and in 1849 he retired "with a fortune ample enough to satisfy his desires."

On March 29, 1820, he married 22-year-old Annie Watt, with whom he had nine children, including: Hortensia (born 1824), Eliza Jane Laura (1833), Uranie Cornelia (1836), Lucy Ellen (1839) and Pauline Hortense (1842).

In 1839, Smets co-founded the Georgia Historical Society, in which he became a close friend of Israel Keech Tefft.

Between the mid-1840s and mid-1850s, Smets had built what is now known as the Alexander Smets Range of properties stands between 102 and 108 West Broughton Street in downtown Savannah. He lived with his family at today's Alexander A. Smets House, at 2–4 East Jones Street, which was built in 1853. It is now named Morris Hall, part of the Savannah College of Art and Design. He also became a large land-owner, including a plantation on Hutchinson Island in the Savannah River. He was also a slave owner.

On November 2, 1859, Smets was elected a member of the New England Historic Genealogical Society.

During his life, Smets accumulated a large library, regarded as "one of the most valuable and extensive collections of books ever offered to the American public."

== Death ==
Smets died in 1862, in Indian Springs, Georgia, after a short illness. He was 66. He was initially buried, on May 11, in Savannah's Laurel Grove Cemetery. On March 6, 1919, his (and the rest of his family's) remains were removed from the Smets Vault to Bonaventure Cemetery, where he is now interred alongside his wife, who predeceased him by eight years.
