= Leopold's Ice Cream =

Ice-cream parlor in Savannah, Georgia

Coordinates: 32.0784°N 81.0892°W

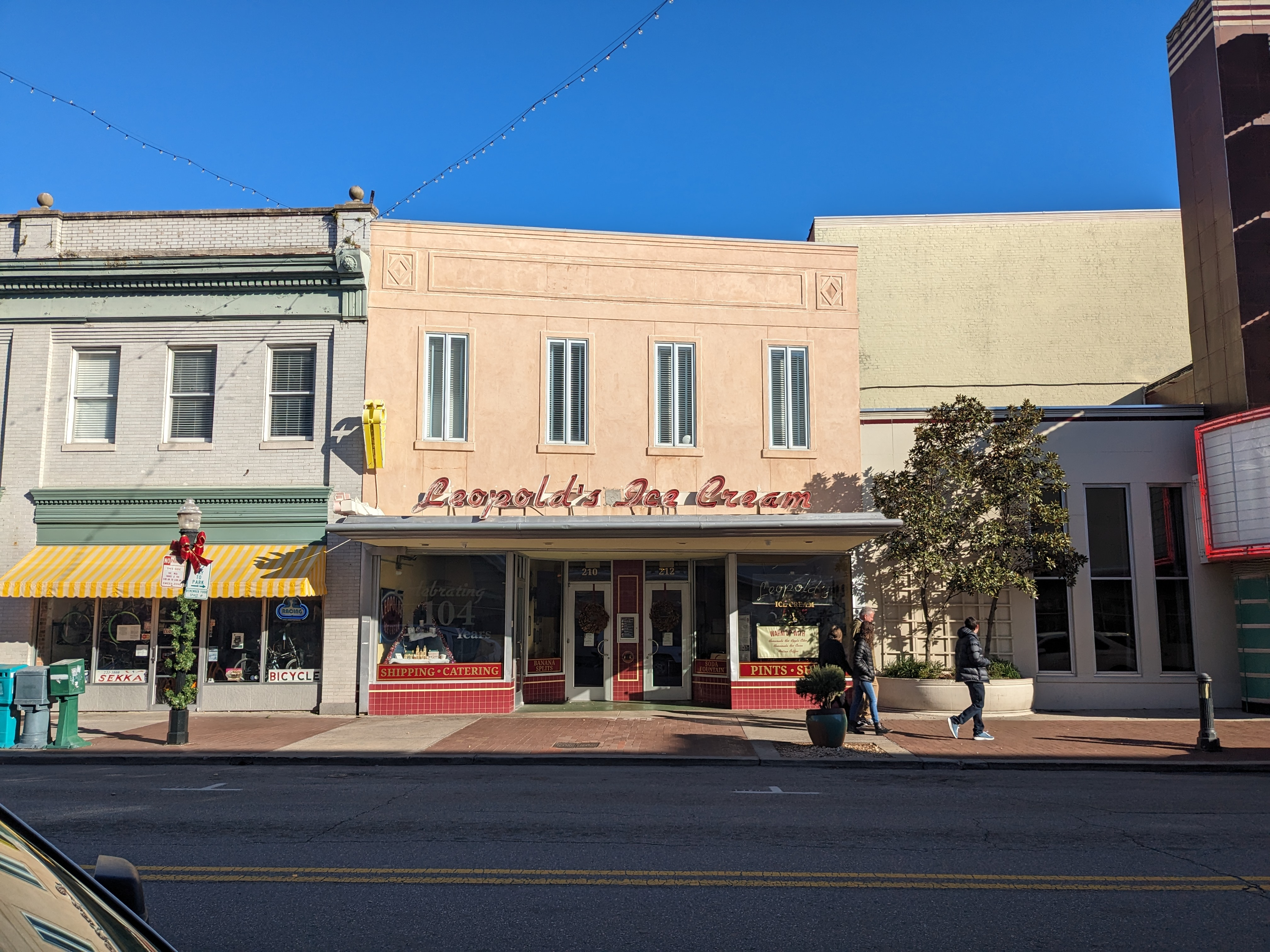
- Flagship East Broughton Street location in 2023
- Formerly: Leopold's Purest Ice Cream
- Type: Restaurant
- Founded: Founded 1919
- Founders: • George Leopold • Peter Leopold • Basil Leopold
- Headquarters: 212 East Broughton Street, Savannah, Georgia, U.S.
- Number of locations: 4 (2026)
- Owners: • Stratton Leopold
- Website: www.leopoldsicecream.com

Leopold's Ice Cream is an ice-cream parlor located in Savannah, Georgia, United States. It was founded in 1919 by three Greek-immigrant brothers, George, Peter, and Basil Leopold, . The brothers first immigrated to Brazil, Indiana, but later moved to Savannah to be near their sister, Demetra, who had married Savannah local George Paul Carellas. By 1969 they had opened an additional shop at Medical Arts Shopping Center where Basil Leopold overseen the business with his wife. This allowed Peter's youngest son, Stratton to close the original shop and pursue his academic and movie industry goals.

== History ==
Leopold's original location, Leopold's Ice Cream, was at the northeastern corner of East Gwinnett Street and Habersham Street, a former fruit stand in the Historic District - South, a few blocks east of Forsyth Park. Peter Leopold, having just returned from serving in the First World War in France, was speaking to the owner of the fruit stand, a fellow Greek, while waiting for a streetcar. Leopold inquired about starting a business there, and shortly afterwards he and his older brother, George, bought the store. Their younger brother, Basil, immigrated in 1925 and became the third partner in the business.

The brothers utilized the French pot process they had learned from master confectioner James Peter Zarafonetis back in Indiana, making five- and ten-gallon batches of ice cream in-house from their own recipes and using fresh cream, milk and eggs from local dairy farms.

The brothers remodeled the shop in 1935, modernizing it and launching an improved delivery service.

Stratton Leopold took over the business with his mother, Marika, after his father's death in 1963 (George had died two years previous). Stratton closed the shop in 1969, and left Savannah for Hollywood, via New York City, where he is now a film producer, director and actor. Ice cream and sweet treats continued to be served across town at Basil Leopold's Restaurant, which opened in 1962 at Medical Arts Shopping Center.

In August 2004, Leopold's moved to its present home on East Broughton Street, in Savannah's downtown, where it is known for regularly having a line of customers waiting outside. Stratton Leopold hired Hollywood production designer Dan Lomino to recreate his father's soda fountain from the original store. The ice cream is made, using the same recipes developed by his father and uncles, at a former wholesale florist building at 37th and Price Streets and brought over to the store as necessary.

Leopold's signature flavor is tutti frutti, a favorite of Savannah's Johnny Mercer, who worked in the shop as a ten-year old, sweeping floors, while former U.S. President Jimmy Carter's favorite was the butter pecan. Carter wrote the foreword to Leopold's Ice Cream: A Century of Tasty Memories, 1919–2019 (Melanie Bowden Simón, 2020).

The company celebrated its centenary on August 18, 2019, and held a block party the previous day.

Leopold's has a kiosk and a full-service shop at Savannah/Hilton Head International Airport. It also has locations on Whitemarsh Island and on Savannah's Bull Street.

== Gallery ==
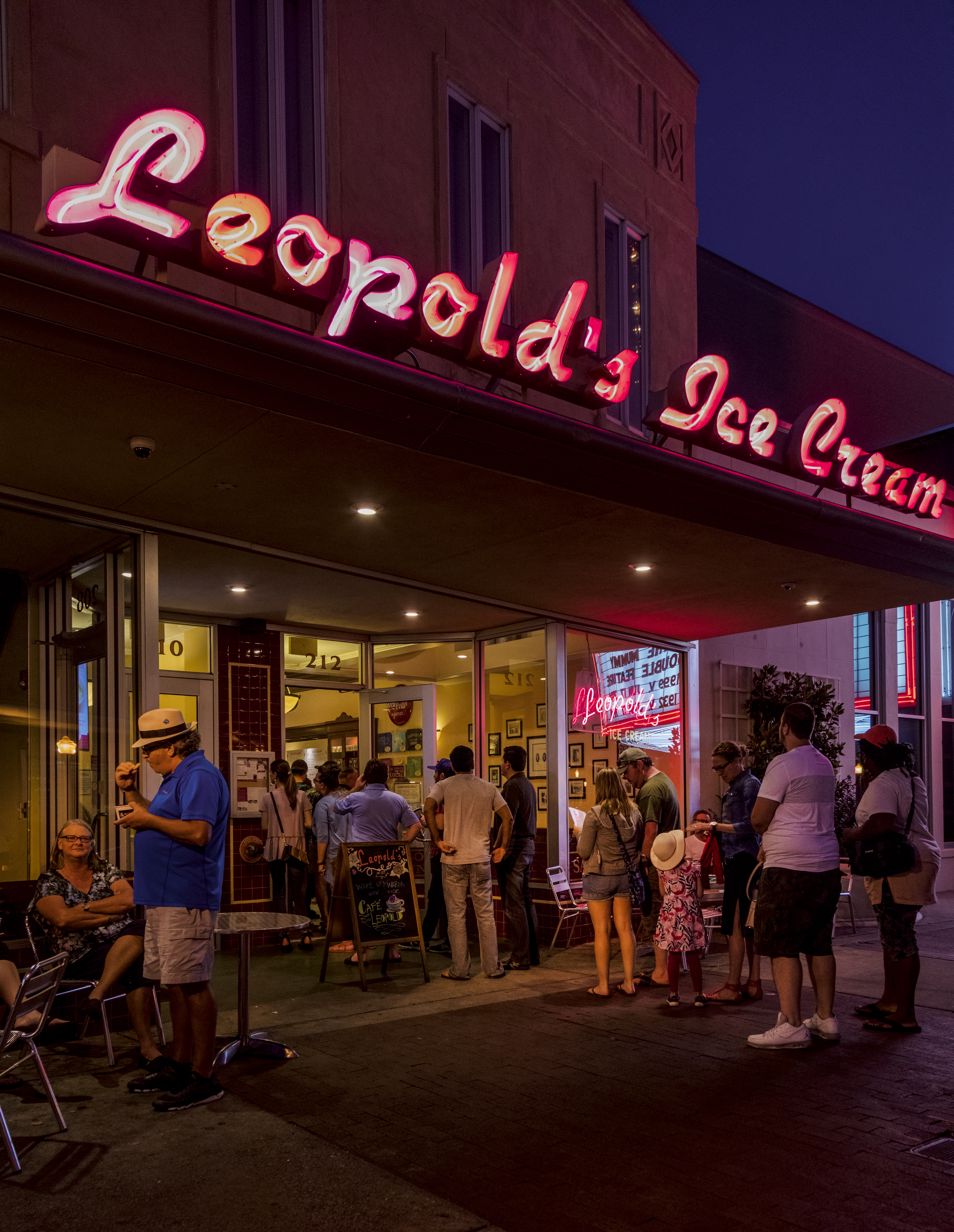
A line outside the store in 2017

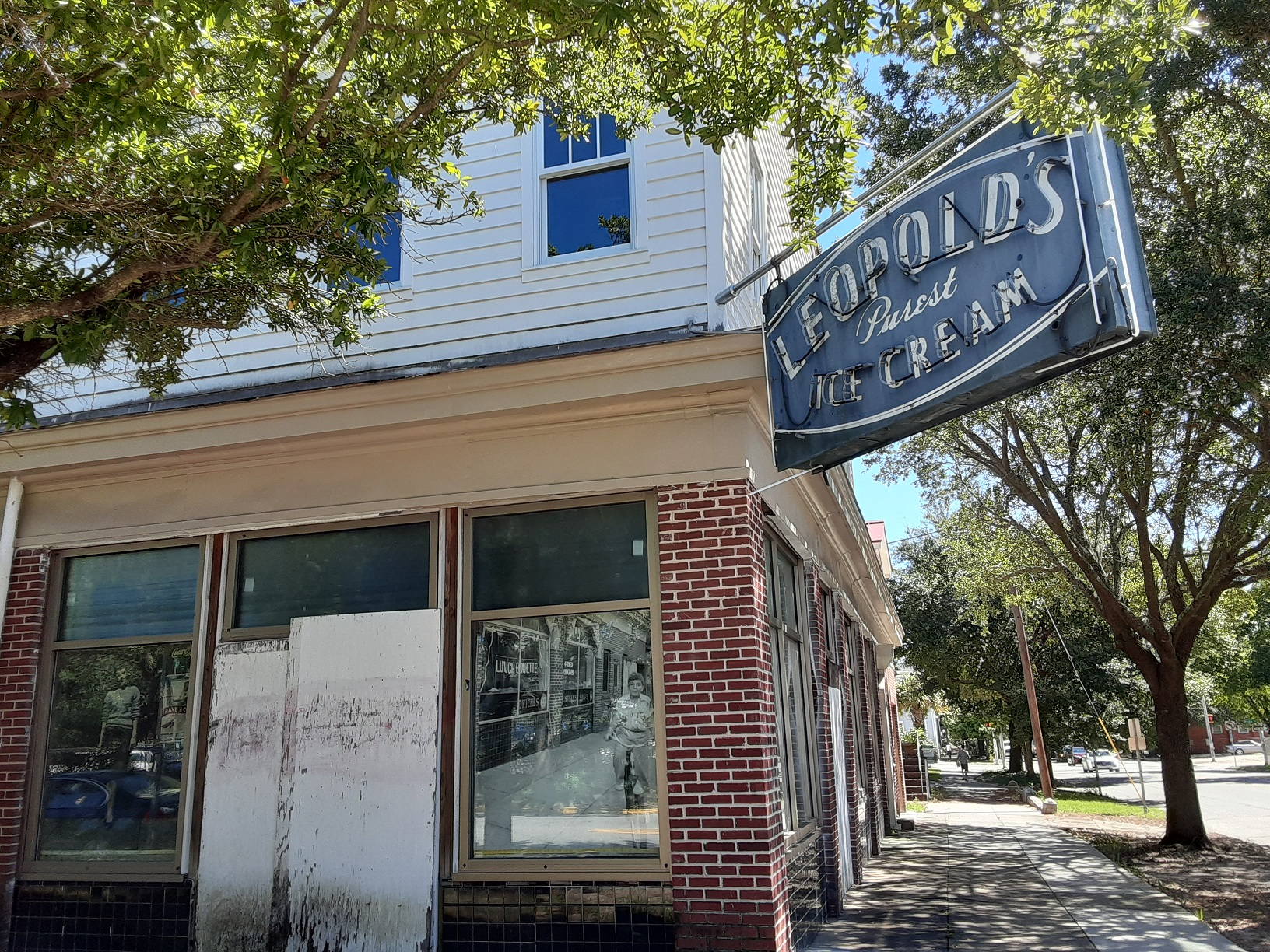
Leopold's Ice Cream, original Savannah location at 720 Habersham Street in 2021

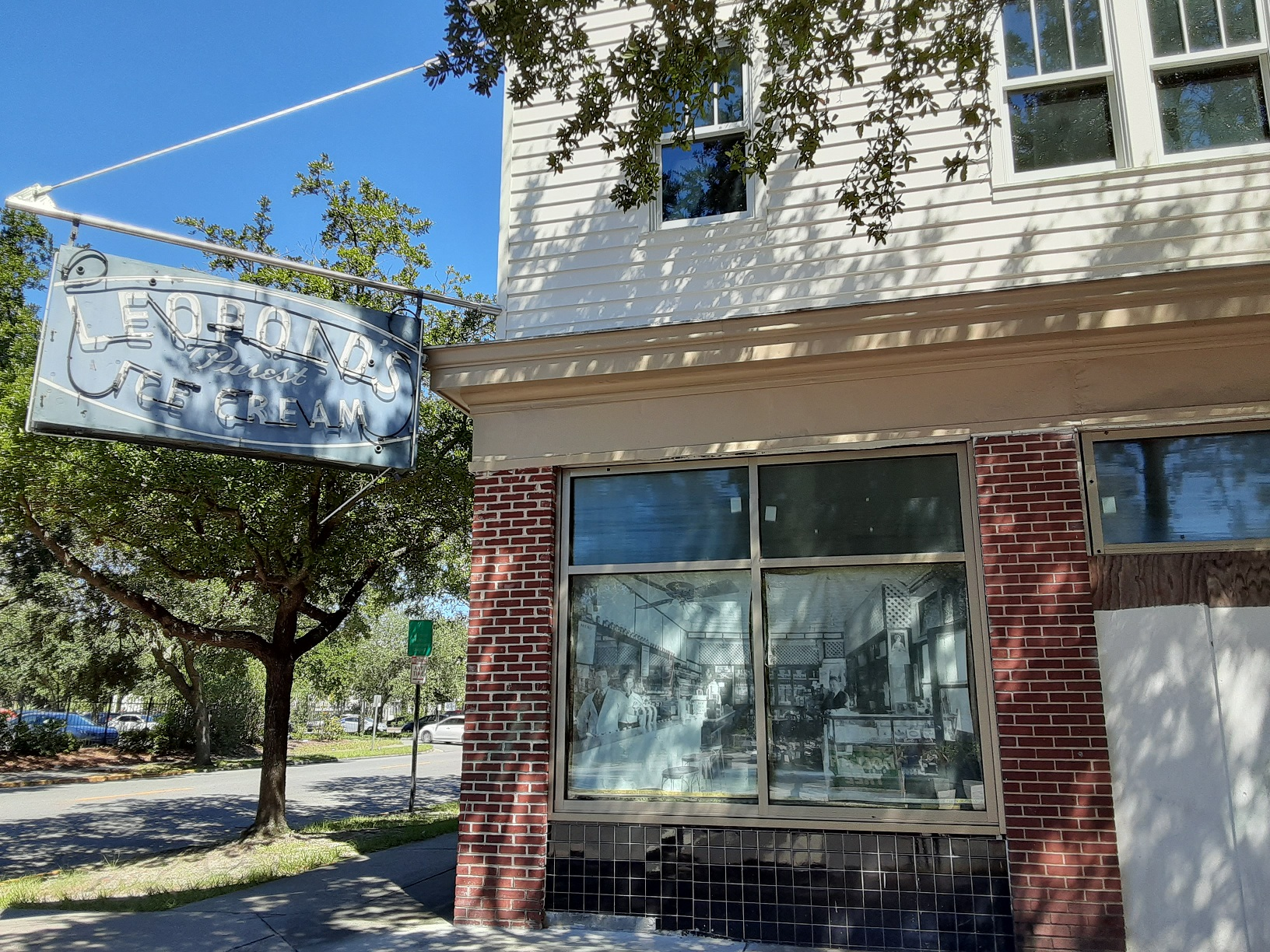
Gwinnett Street view in 2021
