= 17 Hundred 90 Inn =

Historic inn in Georgia, United States

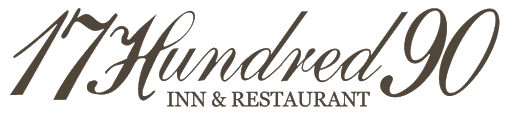

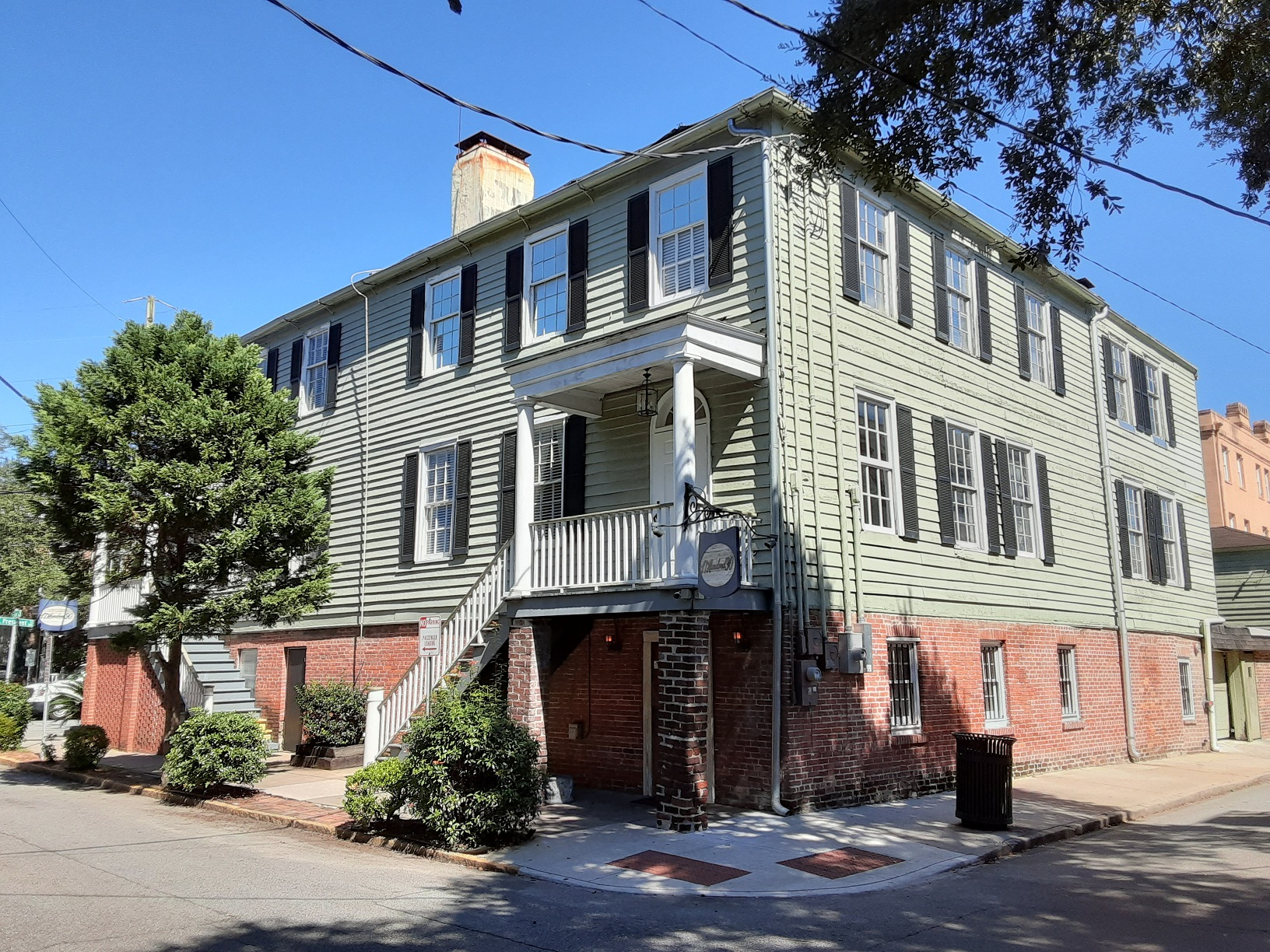
- The building's Lincoln Street and East York Street corner in 2021
- Interactive map of the 17 Hundred 90 Inn area

General information
- Location: Savannah, Georgia, U.S., 307 East President Street
- Coordinates: 32.07686°N 81.08874°W
- Completed: 1790; 236 years ago
- Owner: Patrick Godley

Technical details
- Floor count: 3
- 17 Hundred 90 Inn
- U.S. National Historic Landmark District – Contributing property
- Part of: Savannah Historic District (ID66000277)
- Designated NHLDCP: November 13, 1966

17 Hundred 90 Inn & Restaurant (also stylized as 17Hundred90 Inn & Restaurant) is a historic inn, restaurant and tavern in Savannah, Georgia, United States. Located on East President Street, just west of Columbia Square, it is Savannah's oldest inn, occupying a building dating to 1790, thus pre-dating the foundation of the square. The entrance to its tavern is at the corner of Lincoln Street and East York Street.

The property, which is situated in the Savannah Historic District, occupies what was originally three separate residences. The western part of the building (on Lincoln Street), built around 1822 by Steele White, was a duplex. The smaller eastern section, meanwhile, was built by the Powers family in 1888. The ground level is believed to be part of an earlier structure that was burned in the Savannah fire of 1820.

Anna Powers, a former resident of one of the three properties from the late 18th century into the early 19th century, supposedly jumped out of one of its windows to her death after an argument with her love interests, an English sailor who had gone AWOL to be with her. Another version is that Powers was pushed to her death, possibly by another female who was in love with the same sailor. Her ghost reportedly haunts the property.

The inn, which was featured in a season 2 episode of My Ghost Story, also owns a three-story guest house across East York Street.

== See also ==
- Buildings in Savannah Historic District
