= Stratton Leopold =

American actor

- Born: 1943 (age 82–83); Savannah, Georgia, U.S.
- Known for: Owner of Leopold's Ice Cream; film producer, director and actor
- Parent(s): Peter and Marika Leopold

Stratton Leopold (born 1943) is an American producer, director and actor who has been in the film business for more than forty years, producing major, large-budget films.

== Career ==
Leopold has nearly 60 film and television credits to his name ranging from executive producer and producer to casting director and actor. He also served as an Executive Vice President at Paramount Pictures.

Leopold launched his film career in 1974 as a location casting director and location manager for low-budget movies. He is best known for his work as a producer or executive producer of several high budget, commercially successful films, such as Bound by Honor, The General’s Daughter, The Sum of All Fears, Paycheck, and Mission: Impossible III. Leopold also served as an actor and producer on John Carpenter’s cult classic film, They Live.

Leopold is a member of the Directors Guild of America and Producers Guild of America.

== Personal life ==
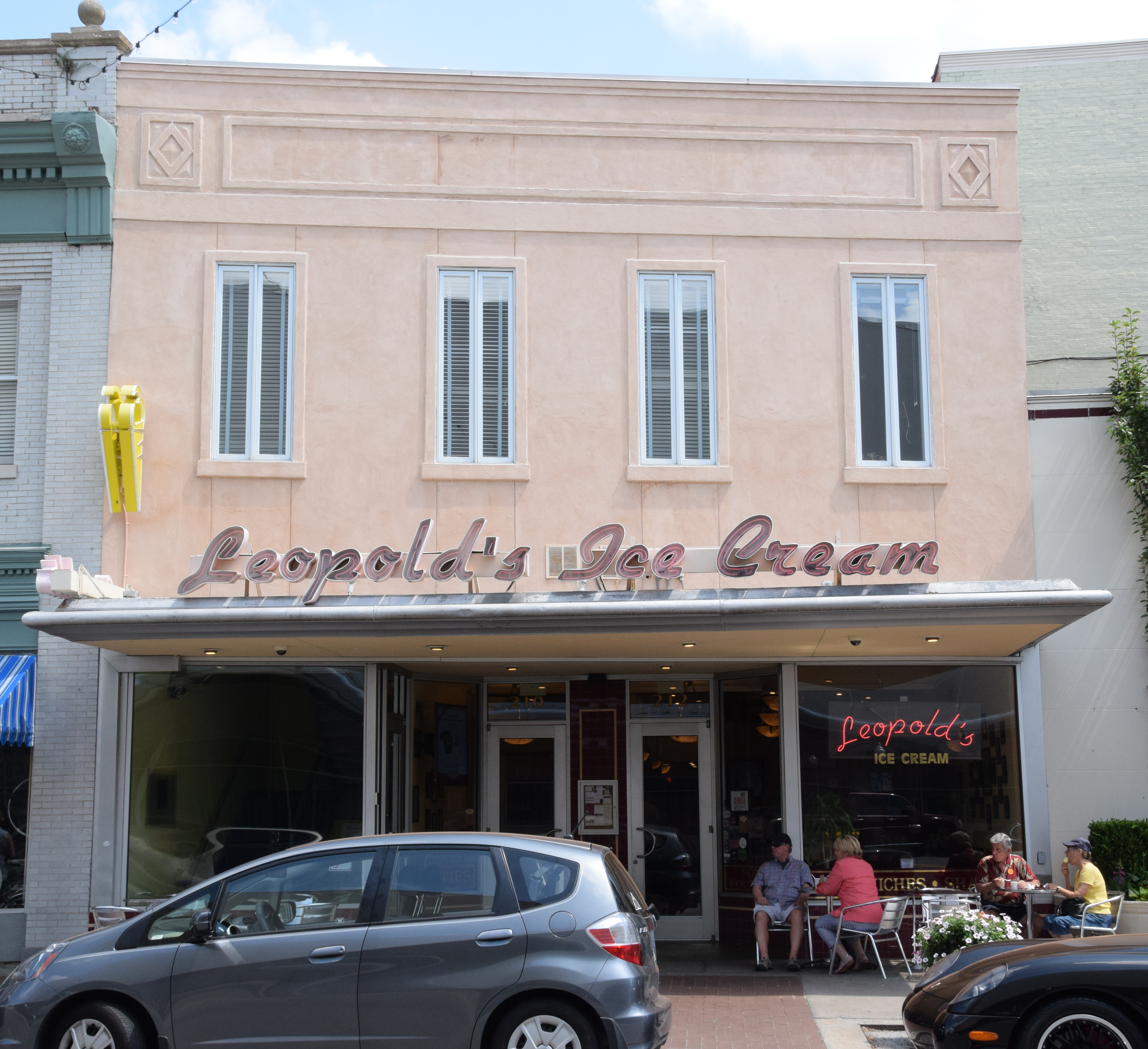
Leopold's Ice Cream store

Stratton is the third child of Peter and Marika, after Elias (Louie) and Basiliki (Beki).

Leopold owns Leopold's Ice Cream in Savannah, Georgia. It was founded by his Greek immigrant father, Peter, and his older brother, George, in 1919. Leopold has incorporated several original fixtures from his father’s store into the current located on Broughton Street. Featuring a 1930s-era soda fountain, original back bar, and props from many of the films Leopold worked on, the parlor is one of the most popular tourist attractions in Savannah.

Stratton is married to Mary.

He is a graduate of Benedictine Military School.

== Selected filmography ==
- Parker, 2013
- Wolfman, 2010
- The Sum of All Fears, 2002
- Paycheck, 2003
- Tears of the Sun, 2003
- The General's Daughter, 1999
- Bound by Honor, 1993
- The Adventures of Baron Munchausen, 1988
- They Live, 1988
- Mission Impossible: III, 2006
