= Columbia Square (Savannah, Georgia) =

Public square in Savannah, Georgia

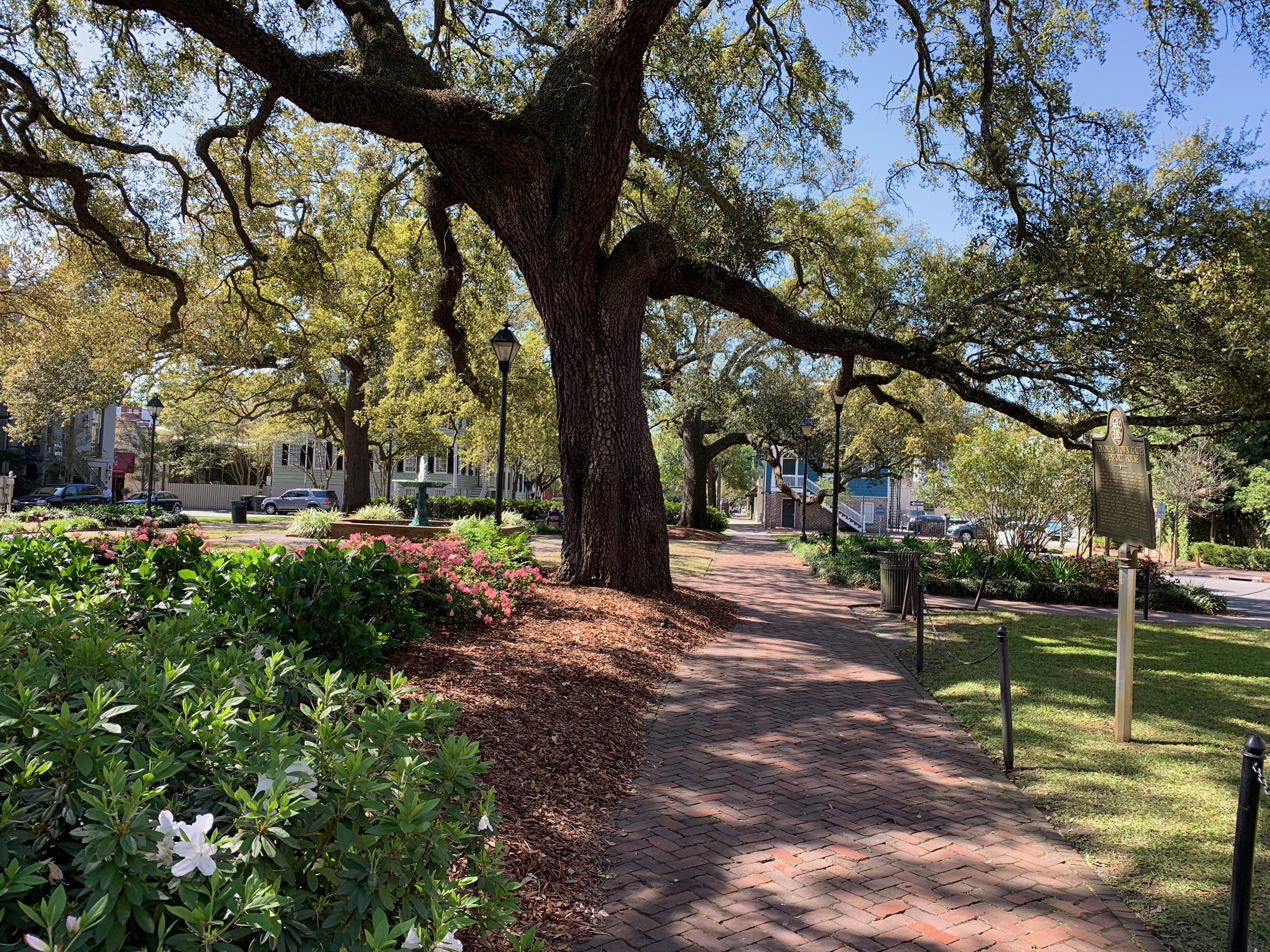
- Looking south from inside the square
- Interactive map of Columbia Square
- Namesake: Columbia
- Maintained by: City of Savannah
- Location: Savannah, Georgia, U.S.
- Coordinates: 32.0768°N 81.0880°W
- North: Habersham Street
- East: East President Street
- South: Habersham Street
- West: East President Street

Construction
- Completion: 1799 (227 years ago)

Columbia Square is one of the 22 squares of Savannah, Georgia, United States. It is located in the second row of the city's five rows of squares, on Habersham Street and East President Street. It is south of Warren Square and between Oglethorpe Square to the west and Greene Square to the east. The oldest building on the square is at 307 East President Street, today's 17 Hundred 90 Inn, which, as its name suggests, dates to the 18th century.

The square was laid out in 1799 and is named for Columbia, the poetic personification of the United States. In the center of the square is a fountain that formerly stood at the Wormsloe estate of Noble Jones, one of Georgia's first settlers. It was moved to Columbia Square in 1970 to honor Augusta and Wymberly DeRenne, descendants of Jones. It is sometimes called the "rustic fountain," as it is decorated with vines, leaves, flowers, and other woodland motifs.

Irish immigrant William Kehoe built a house on the eastern side of the square, at 130 Habersham Street, in 1885. After both his business and his family expanded, he built a larger home, completed in 1892, diagonally across the square at 123 Habersham Street.

The Timothy Bonticou Double House, at 418–420 East State Street, was moved one block south from 419–421 East Broughton Lane in 1972.

The office of Historic Savannah Foundation is in the southwest tything of the square, at 321 East York Street.

In 2024, a Columbia Square monument was commissioned to honor the seven women who began the preservation movement in Savannah. They were Katherine Judkins Clark, Elinor Adler Dillard, Anna Colquit Hunter, Lucy Barrow McIntire, Dorothy Ripley Roebling, Nola McEvoy Roos and Jane Adair Wright.

== Dedication ==
| Namesake | Image | Note |
|---|---|---|
| Columbia | | The square is named for Columbia, the poetic personification of the United States. |

== Markers and structures ==
| Object | Image | Note |
|---|---|---|
| Fountain | | Columbia Square fountain, looking east. The Green Fleetwood House, at 128 Habersham Street, in the background has since been painted yellow. |

== Constituent buildings ==
Each building below is in one of the eight blocks around the square composed of four residential "tything" blocks and four civic ("trust") blocks, now known as the Oglethorpe Plan. They are listed with construction years where known.

Northwestern tything/residential block

- Isaiah Davenport House, 324 East State Street (1820) – built by Isaiah Davenport

Northwestern trust/civic block

- Kehoe House (2), 123 Habersham Street (1892)

Southwestern trust/civic block

- 307 East President Street – central portion (built 1790) is the oldest building on the square; eastern portion (1823) built for Steele White; western portion (1888) built for Anna Powers; now the home of the 17 Hundred 90 Inn
- Frederick Heineman House, 125–127 Habersham Street (1842)

Southwestern tything/residential block

- Abraham Sheftall House, 321 East York Street (1818) – now the home of Historic Savannah Foundation
- Thomas Morgan House, 313–315 East York Street (1885)
- Jerome H. Wilson Property, 307–311 East York Street (1873)
- Joseph Gammon Property, 134 Lincoln Street (1843)

Northeast tything/residential block

- Francis M. Stone House, 402 East State Street (1821)
- "Laura's Cottage", 416 East State Street (1799–1808) – moved from Greene Ward; built by Isaiah Davenport; set back from the street, almost behind 418–420
- Timothy Bonticou Double House, 418–420 East State Street (1854–1861) – moved from 419–421 East Broughton Lane in 1972
- Henry W. Willink House, 422–424 East State Street (1850)

Northeast trust/civic block

- Abraham Scribner House, 424 East President Street (1810) – remodeled in 1899

Southeastern trust/civic block

- Kehoe House (1), 130 Habersham Street (1885)
- Green Fleetwood House, 128 Habersham Street (1854)

Southeastern tything/residential block

- Frederick Ball House, 136 Habersham Street (1805)
- 409 East York Street (1880)

== Gallery ==
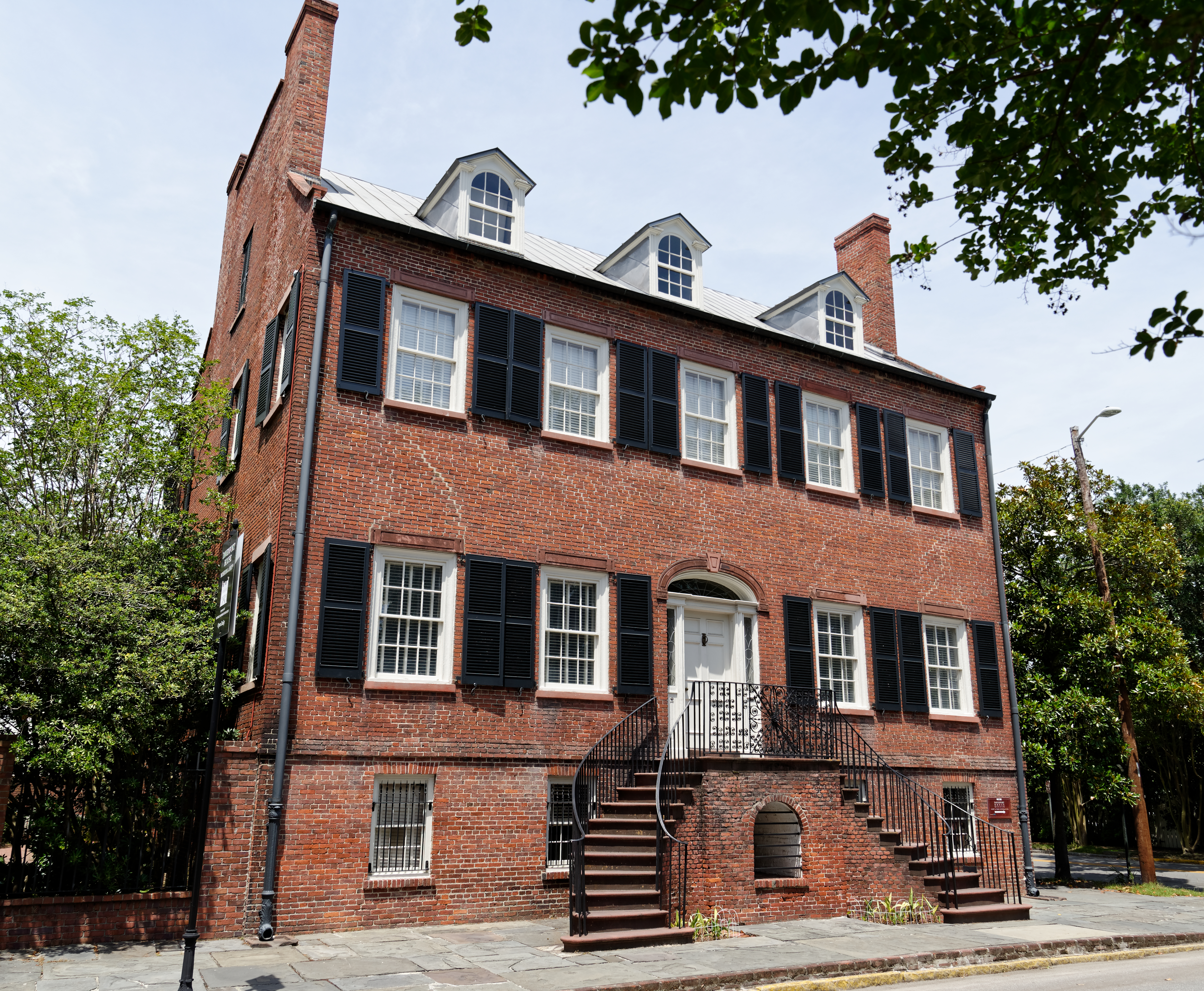
Isaiah Davenport House, 324 East State Street

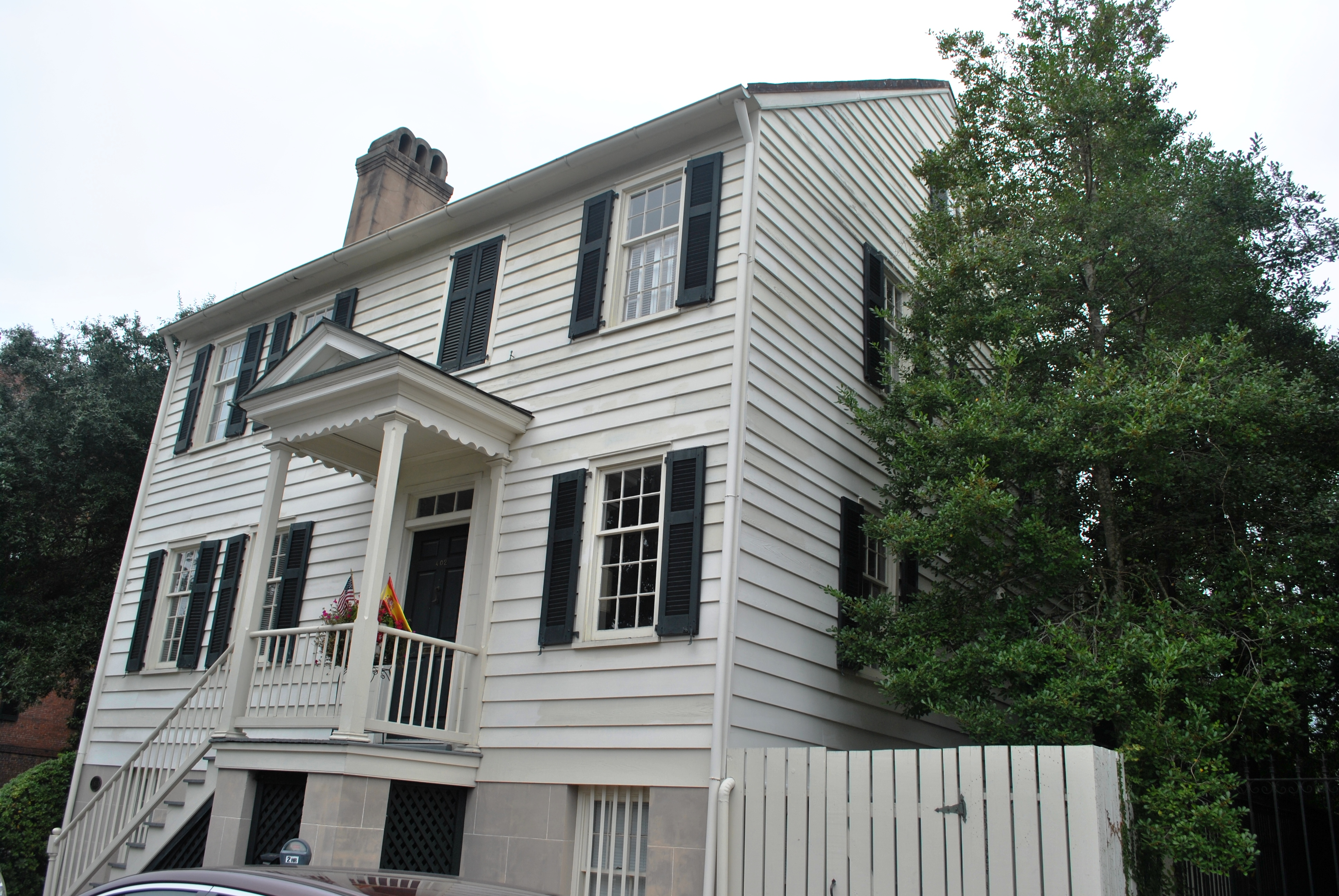
Francis M. Stone House, 402 East State Street

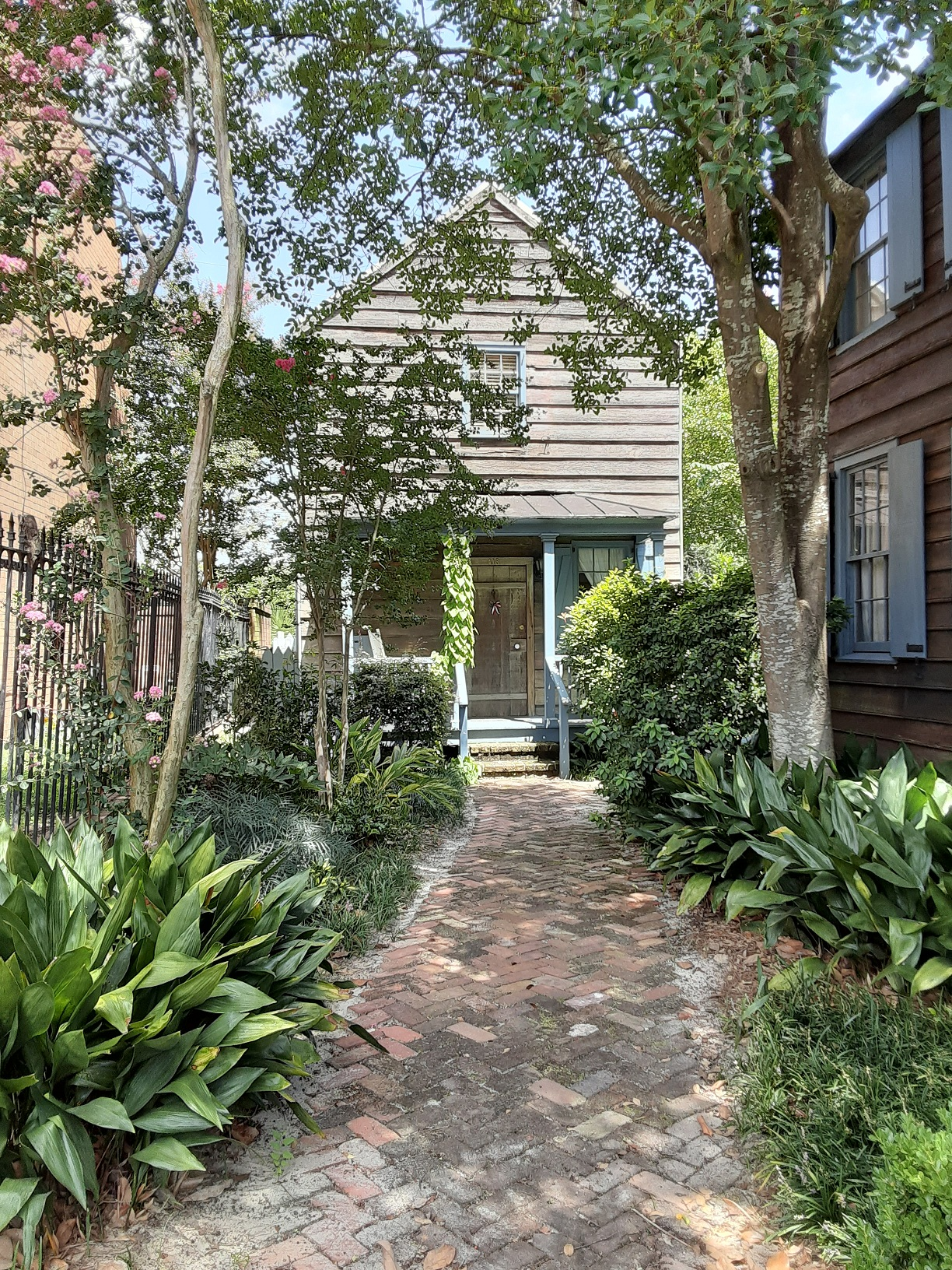
"Laura's Cottage", 416 East State Street

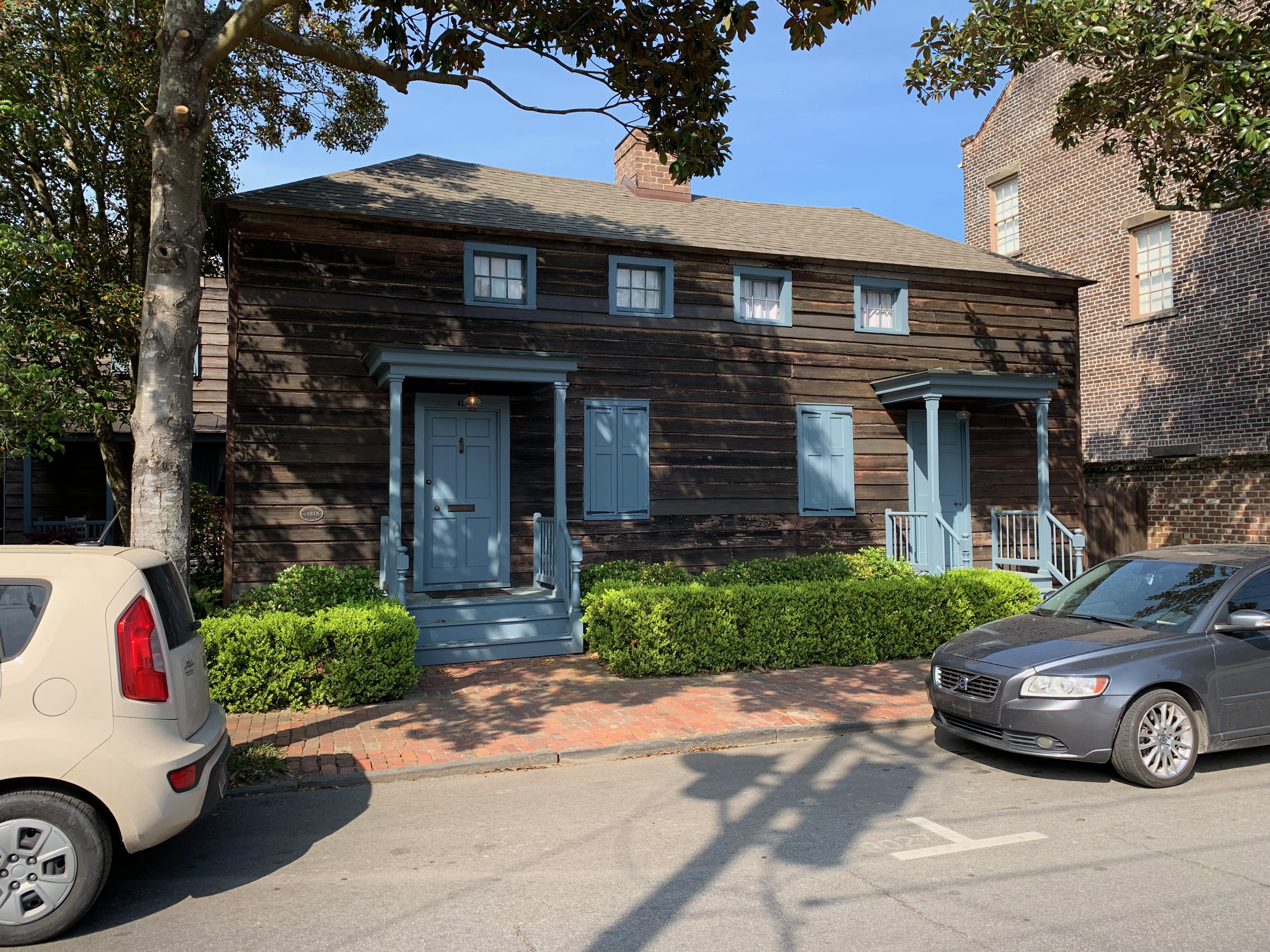
Timothy Bonticou Double House, 418–420 East State Street

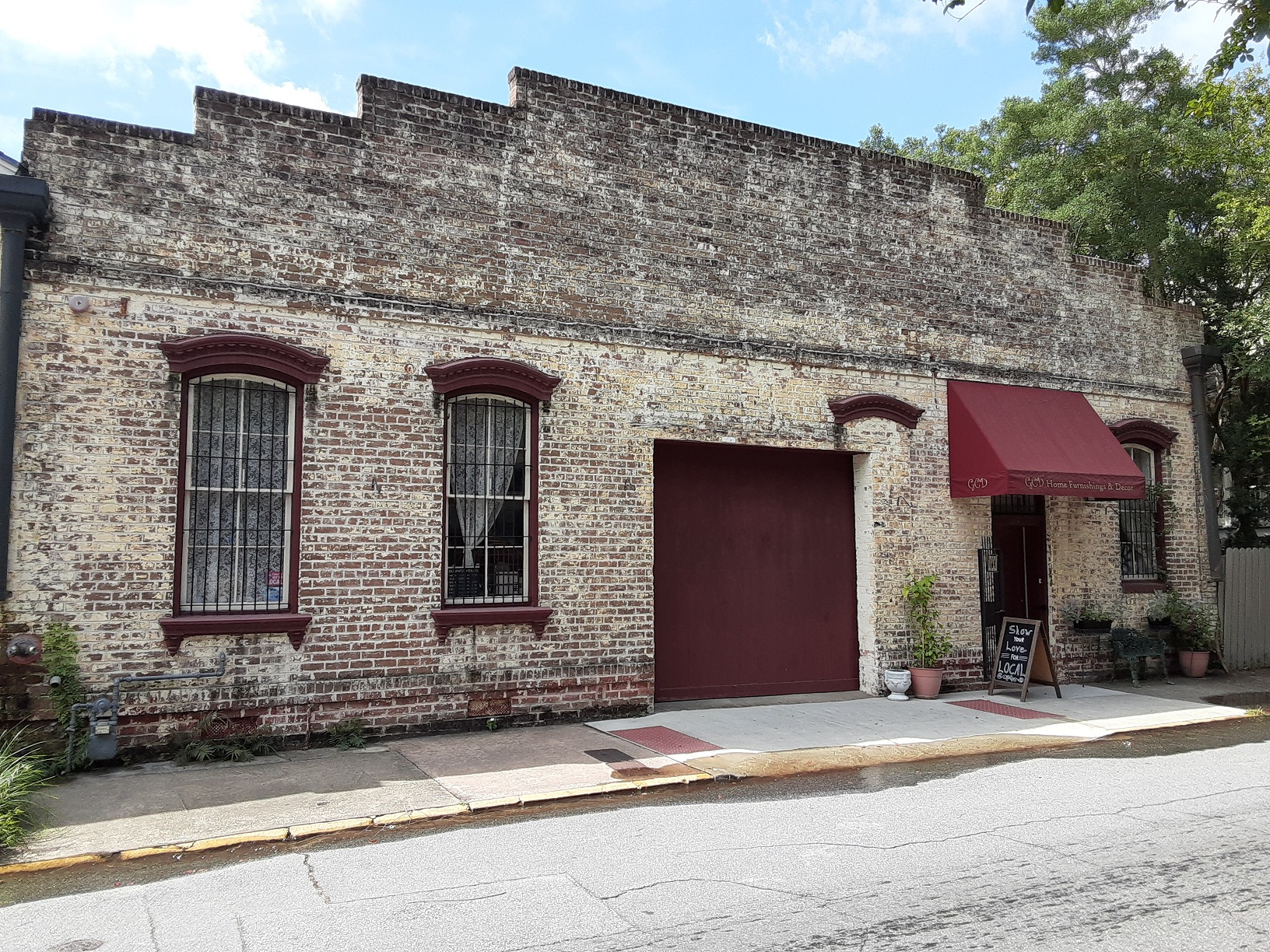
409 East York Street

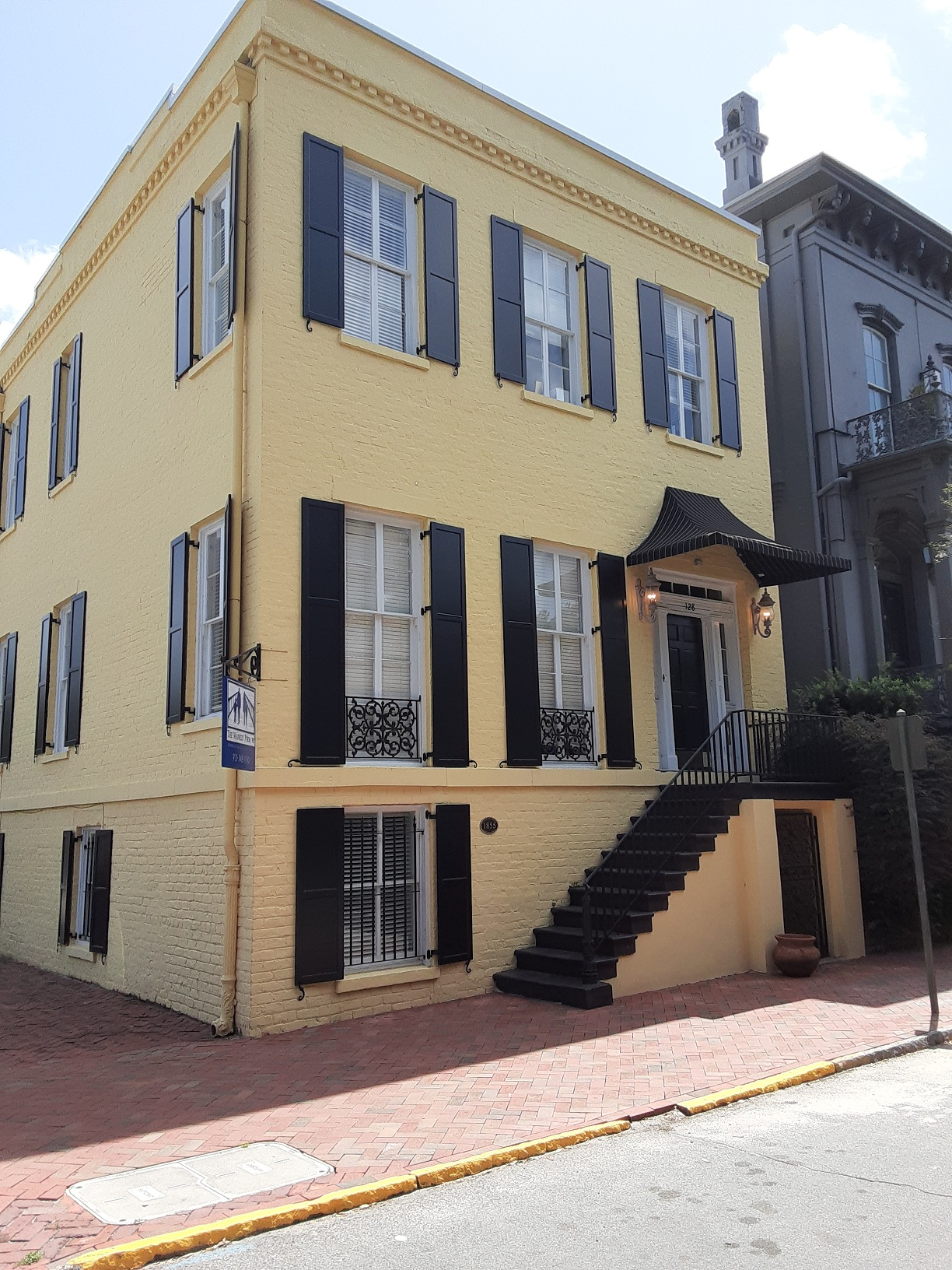
Green Fleetwood House, 128 Habersham Street

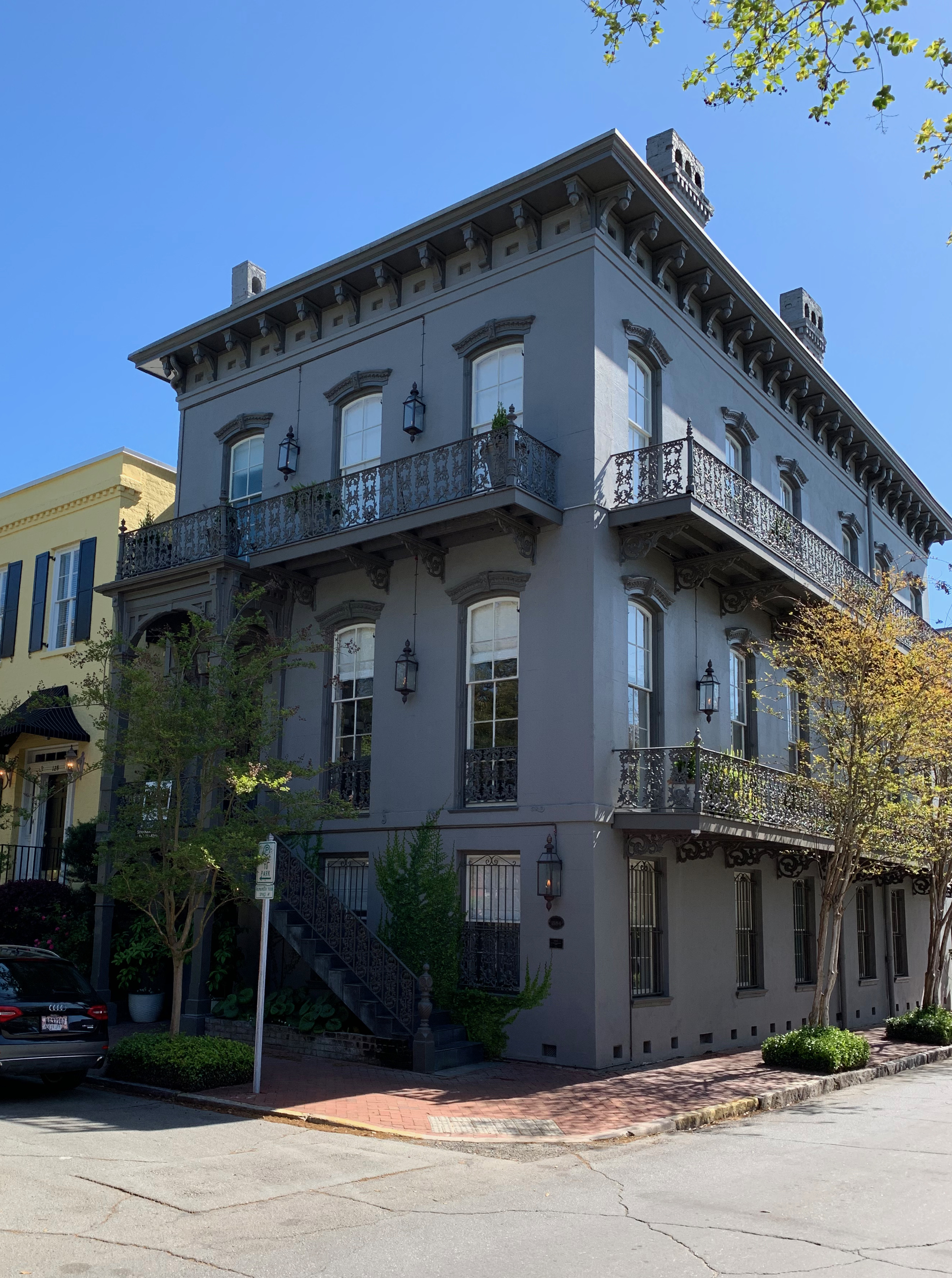
William Kehoe's first house, 130 Habersham Street

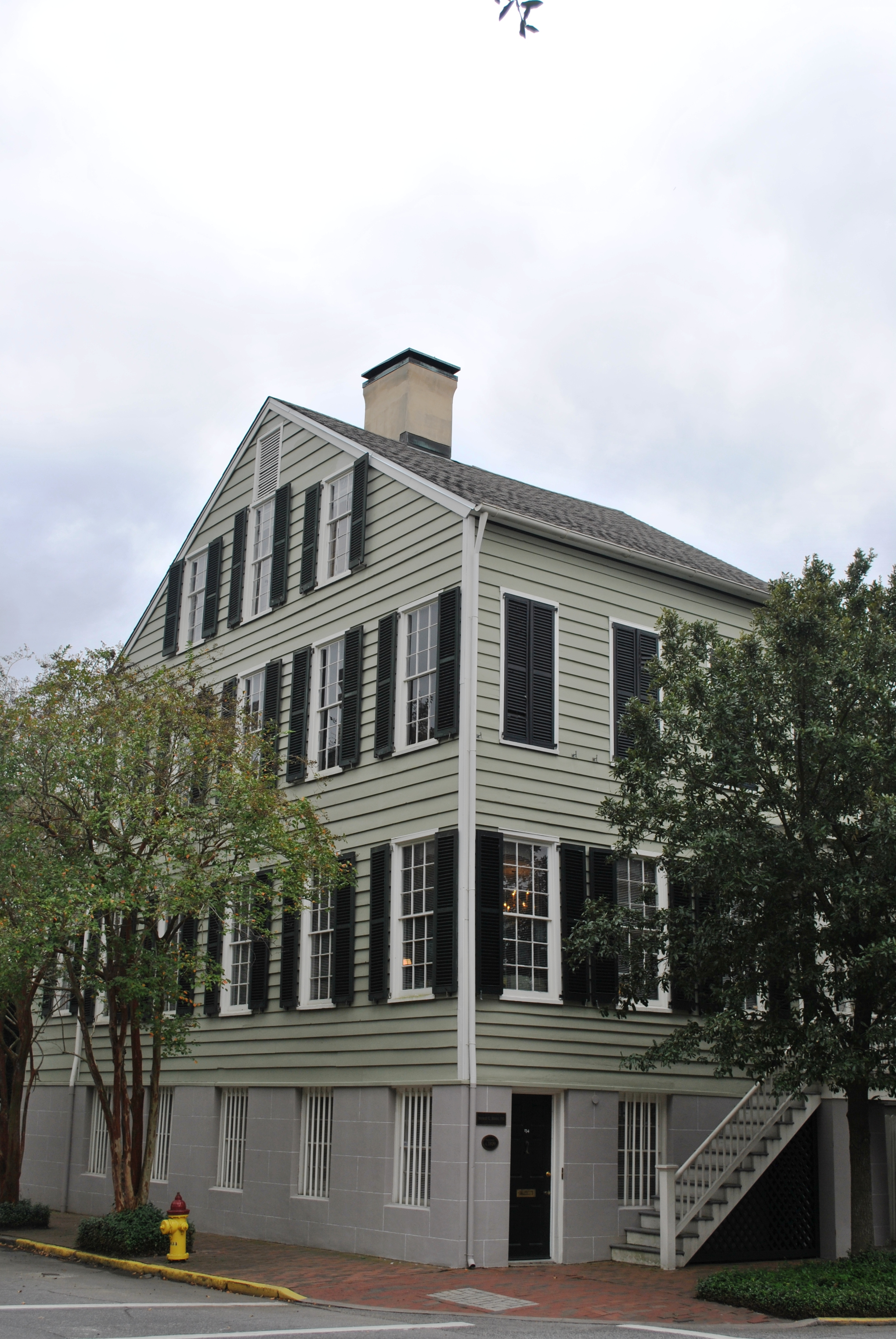
Frederick Ball House, 136 Habersham Street

Kehoe's second house, 123 Habersham Street

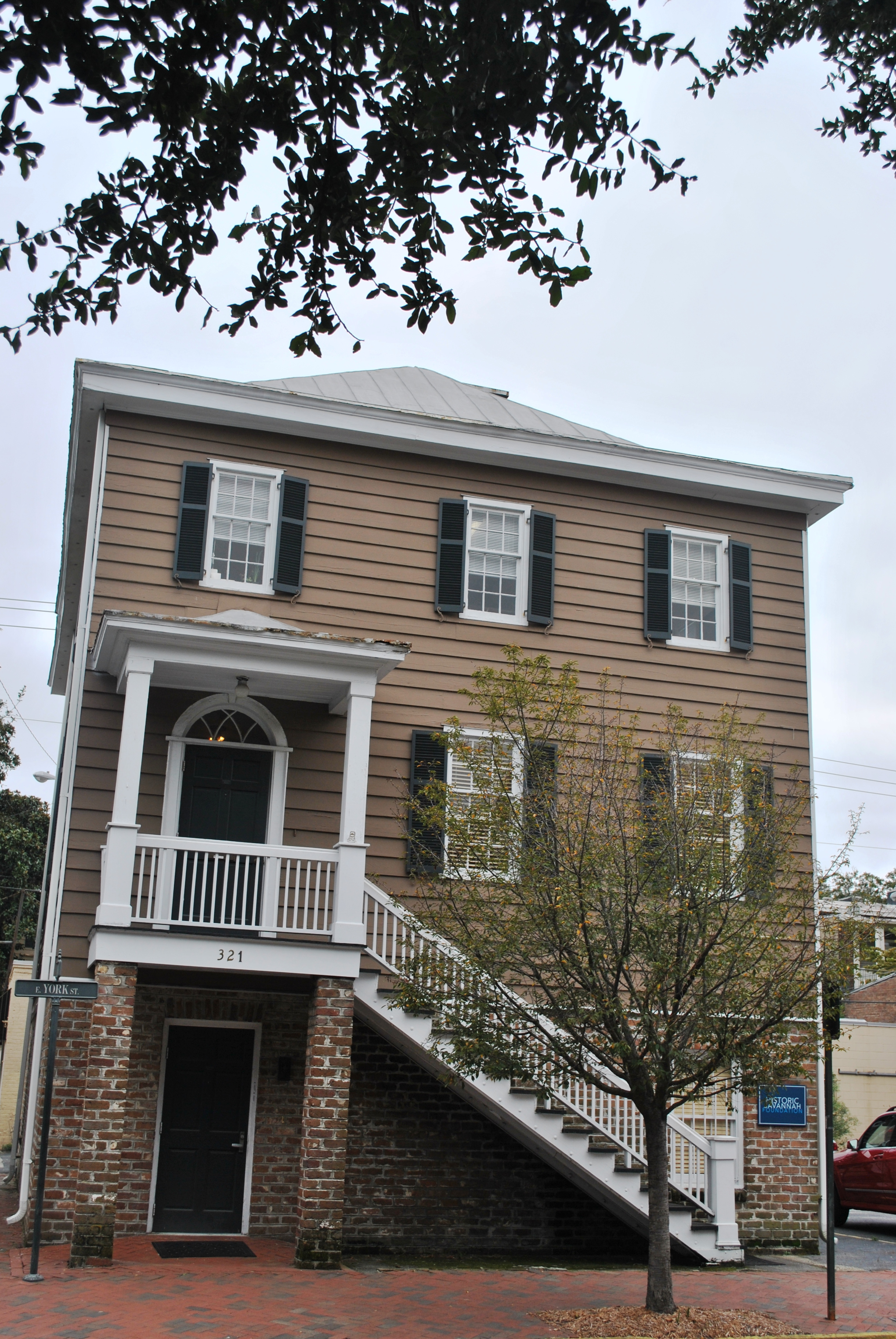
Abraham Sheftall House, 321 East York Street

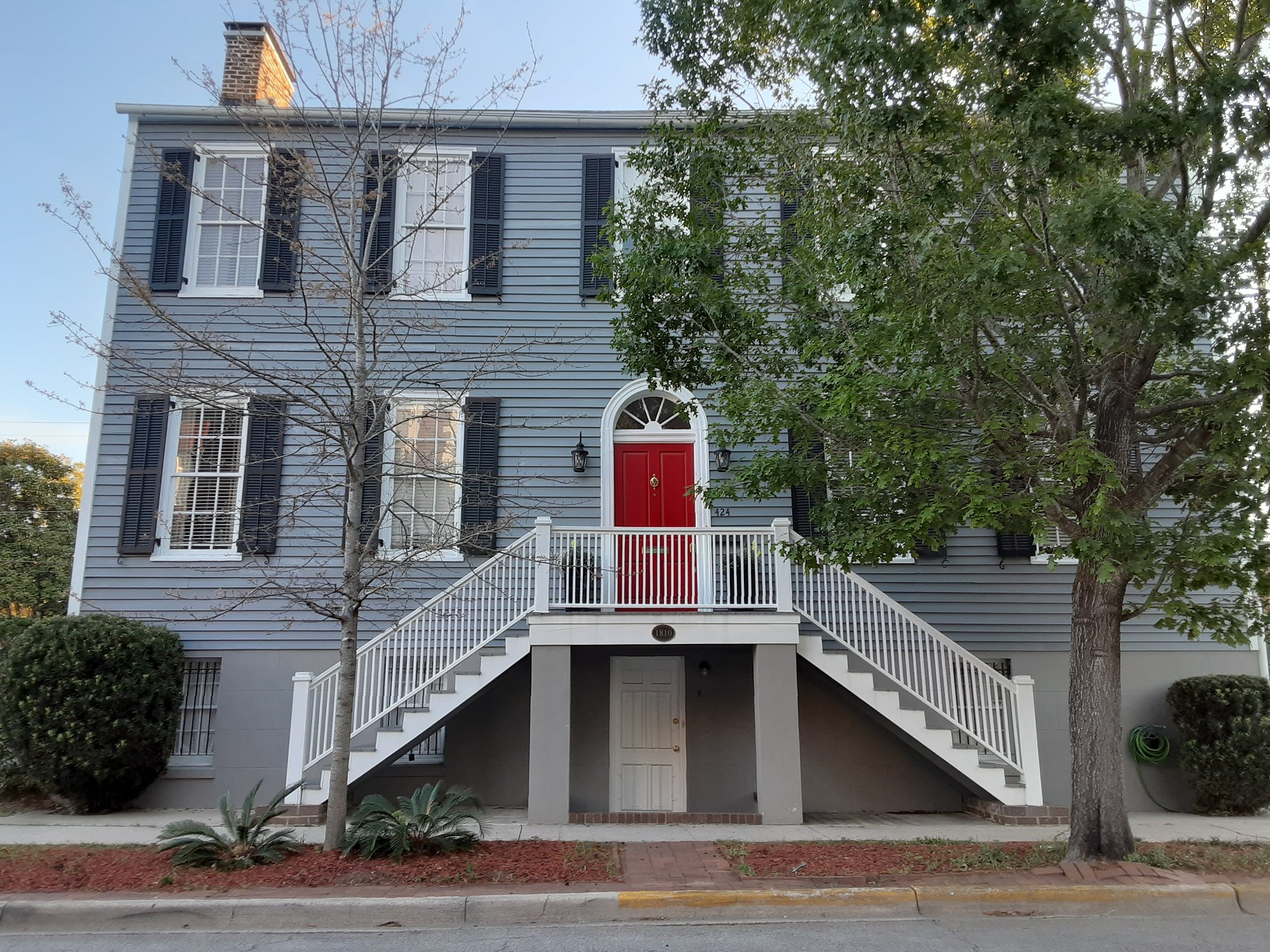
Abraham Scribner House, 424 East President Street

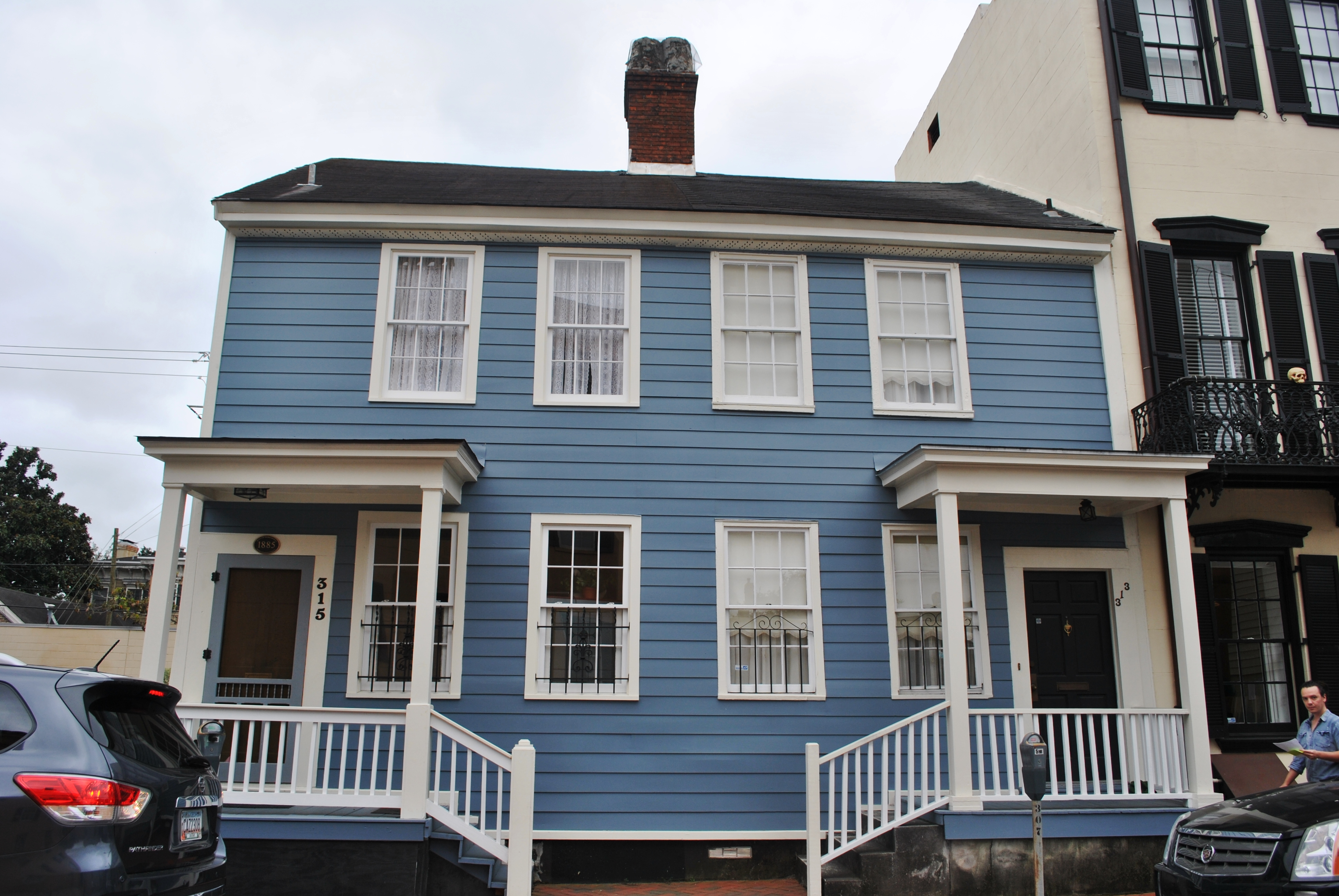
Thomas Morgan House, 313–315 East York Street

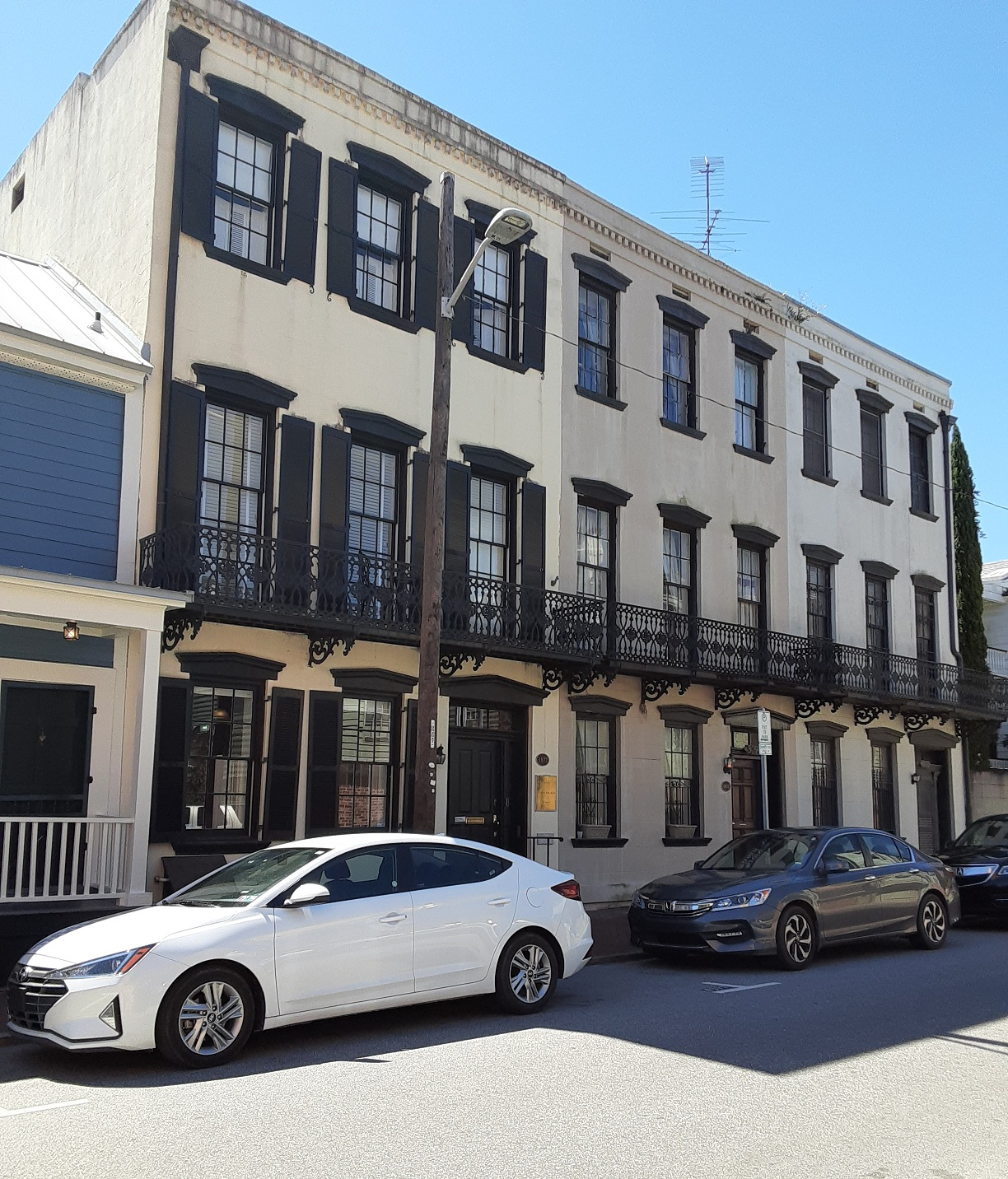
Jerome H. Wilson Property, 307–311 East York Street

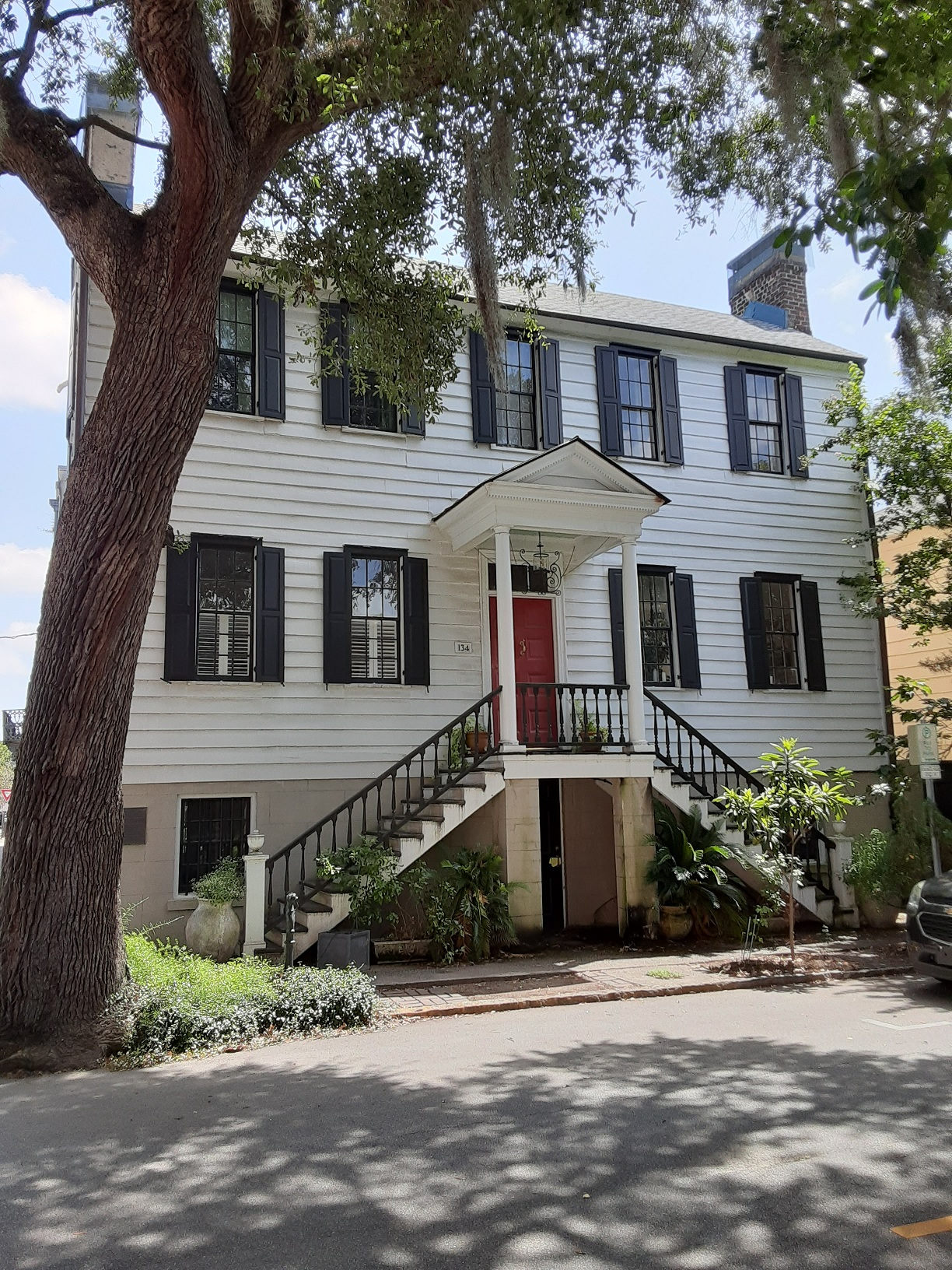
Joseph Gammon Property, 134 Lincoln Street

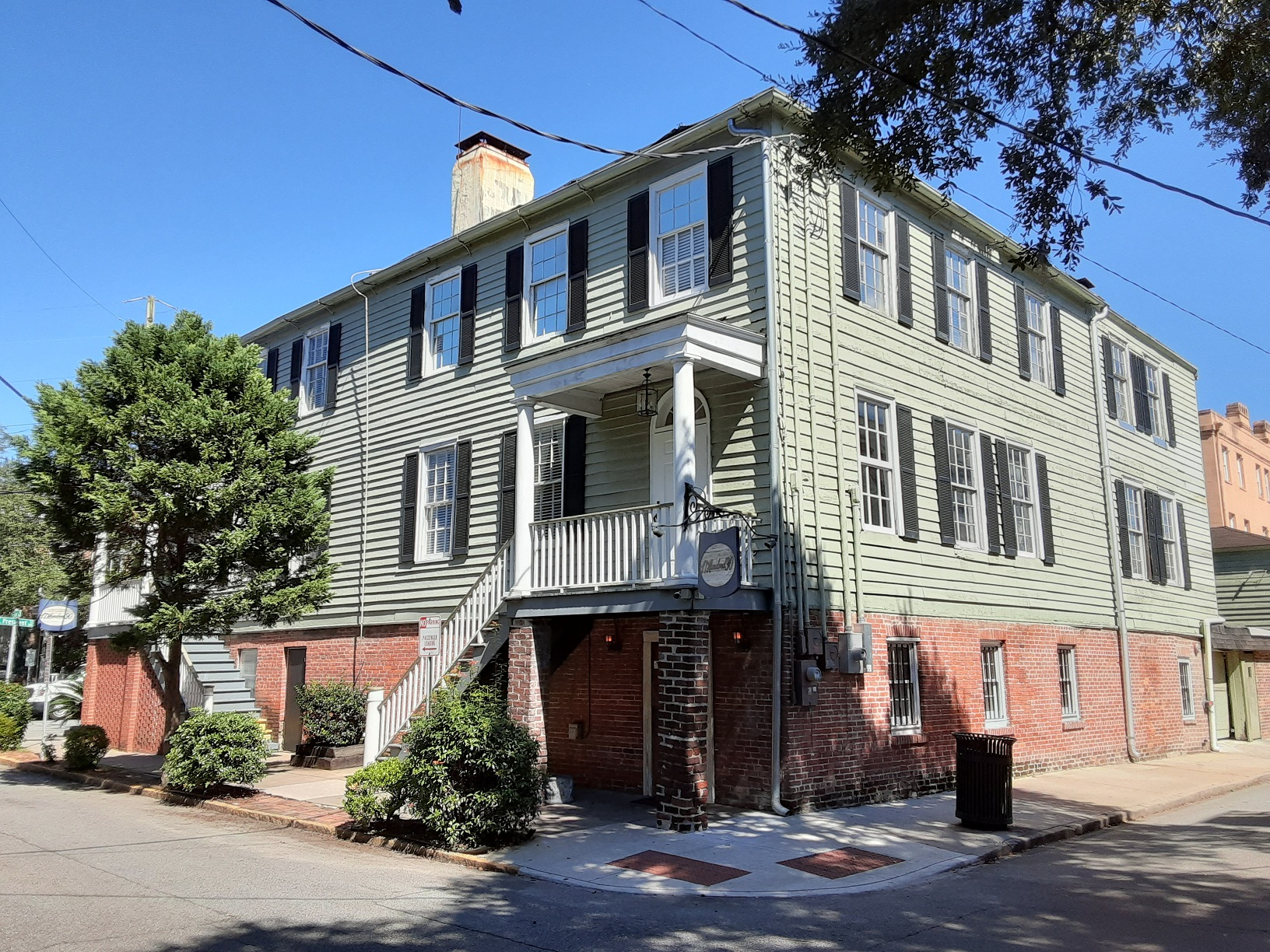
17 Hundred 90 Inn, 307 East President Street

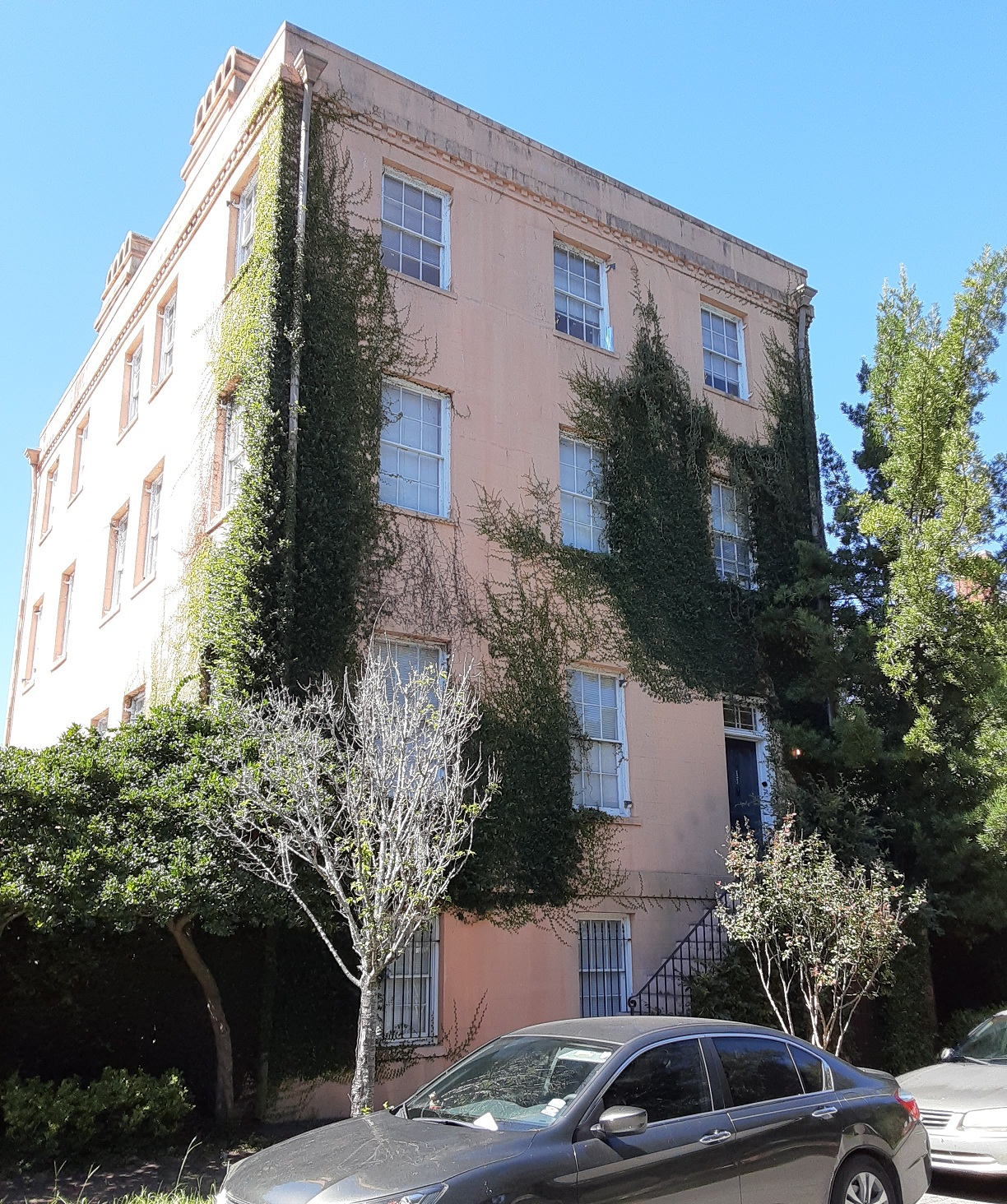
Frederick Heineman House, 125–127 Habersham Street
