= Phoenix Iron Works (Savannah, Georgia) =

Building in Savannah, Georgia, US

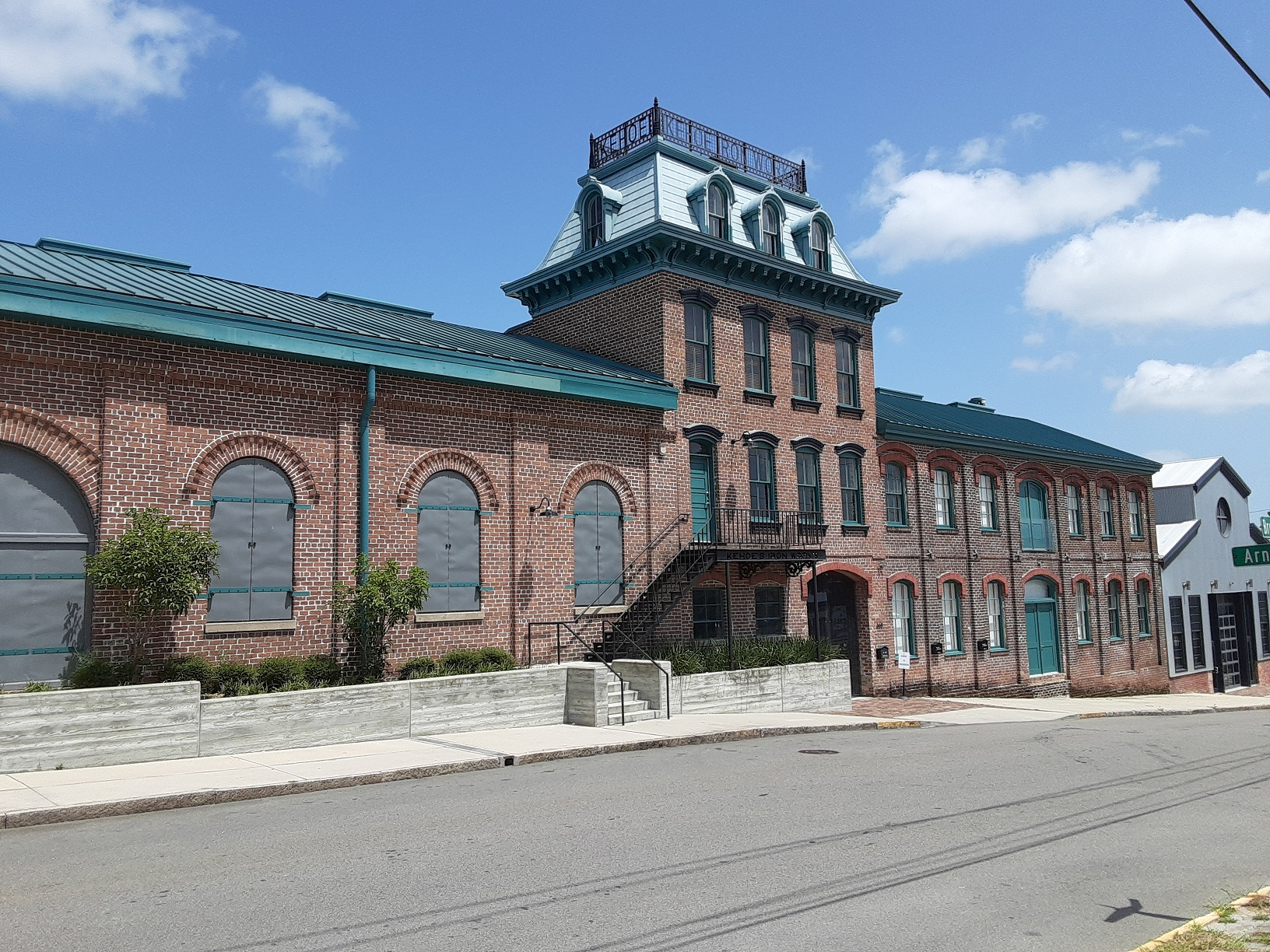
- The building in 2021
- Interactive map of the Phoenix Iron Works area

General information
- Location: Savannah, Georgia, U.S., 656 East Broughton Street
- Coordinates: 32°04′36″N 81°04′58″W
- Completed: 1873 (153 years ago)
- Owner: Randolph Street Development (Charles H. Morris)

Phoenix Iron Works (also known as Kehoe Iron Foundry) is a historic building located in downtown Savannah, Georgia, United States. A former foundry, the property is now owned by Randolph Street Development, having been revitalized as part of a redevelopment of 6.3 acres (2.5 ha) of brownfield land that had remained dormant for almost thirty years.

The building, located in Savannah's Trustees' Garden Ward, was completed in 1873. James Monahan was the original owner.

Irishman William Kehoe became the owner of the foundry in 1879 and renamed it, the following year, to Kehoe Iron Foundry. The building was altered in 1883, including the removal of the cupola above the central section.

The building's 21st-century renovation won the Marguerite Williams Award for Excellence in Rehabilitation.
