= River Street Streetcar =

Heritage streetcar line in Savannah, Georgia, U.S.

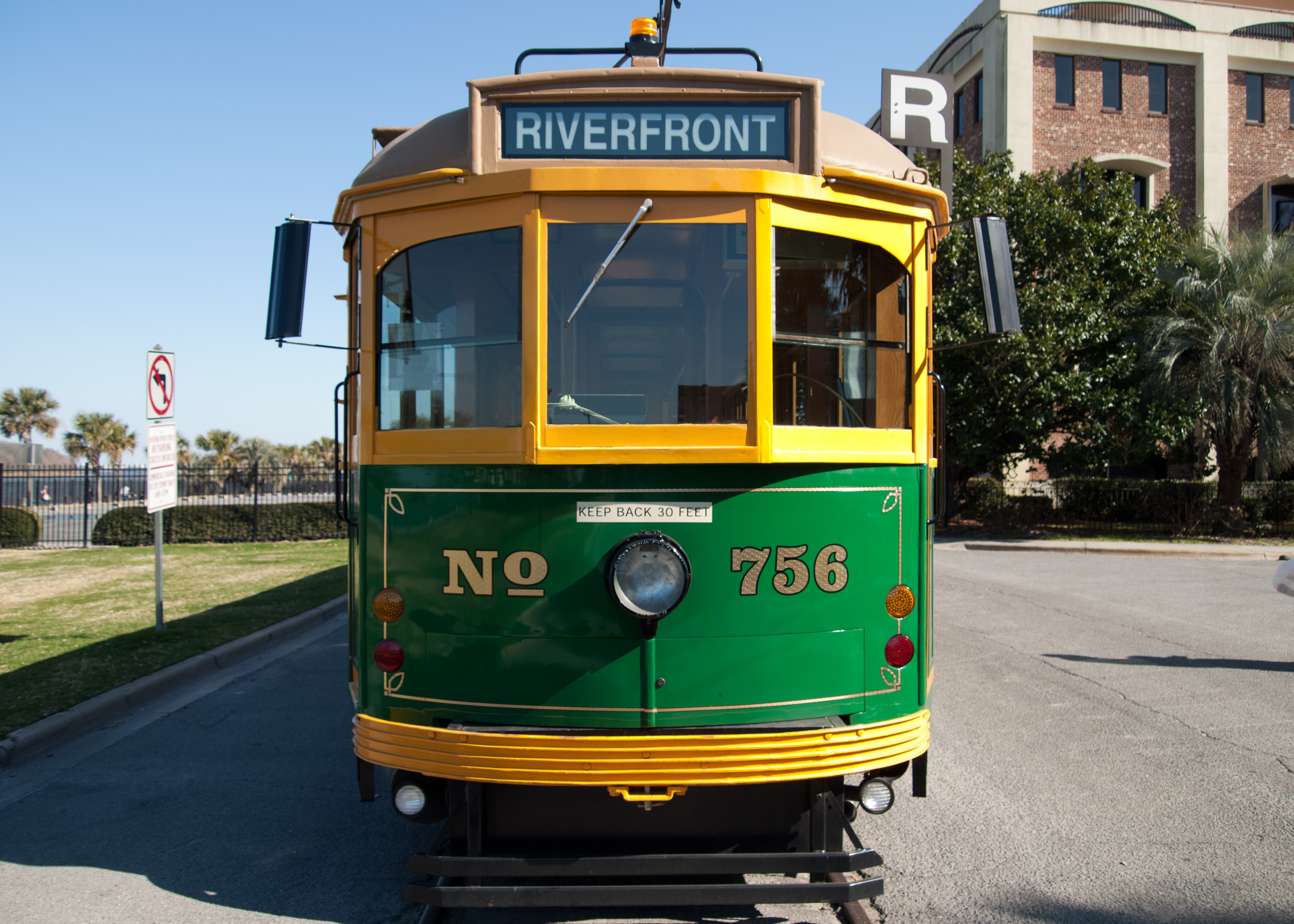
- Car 756 of the River Street Streetcar line

Overview
- Status: Operation suspended indefinitely
- Began service: February 11, 2009
- Ended service: January 16, 2015

Route
- Locale: Savannah, Georgia, U.S.
- Start: Montgomery Street
- End: East Broad Street
- Length: Approx. 1 mile (1.6 km)

Service
- Journey time: 12:00 noon - 9:00 pm
- Operates: Thursday - Sunday

The River Street Streetcar was a heritage streetcar line in Savannah, Georgia, United States. It began regular operation on February 11, 2009, and shuttled between six stops along River Street, next to the Savannah River. In or around 2015, service was quietly discontinued, with no official notice at the time. The maintenance and storage tent on the west side of the line was removed along with the streetcar vehicle itself. It is now being stored at the Georgia State Railroad Museum in the roundhouse.

== History ==
The first horsecars began operation in Savannah in 1869. Electric streetcars started operation in 1890 but were discontinued on August 26, 1946. The Norfolk Southern Railway had owned the River Street branch line for years, operating the River Street Rambler, which was a local freight train, until 2003.

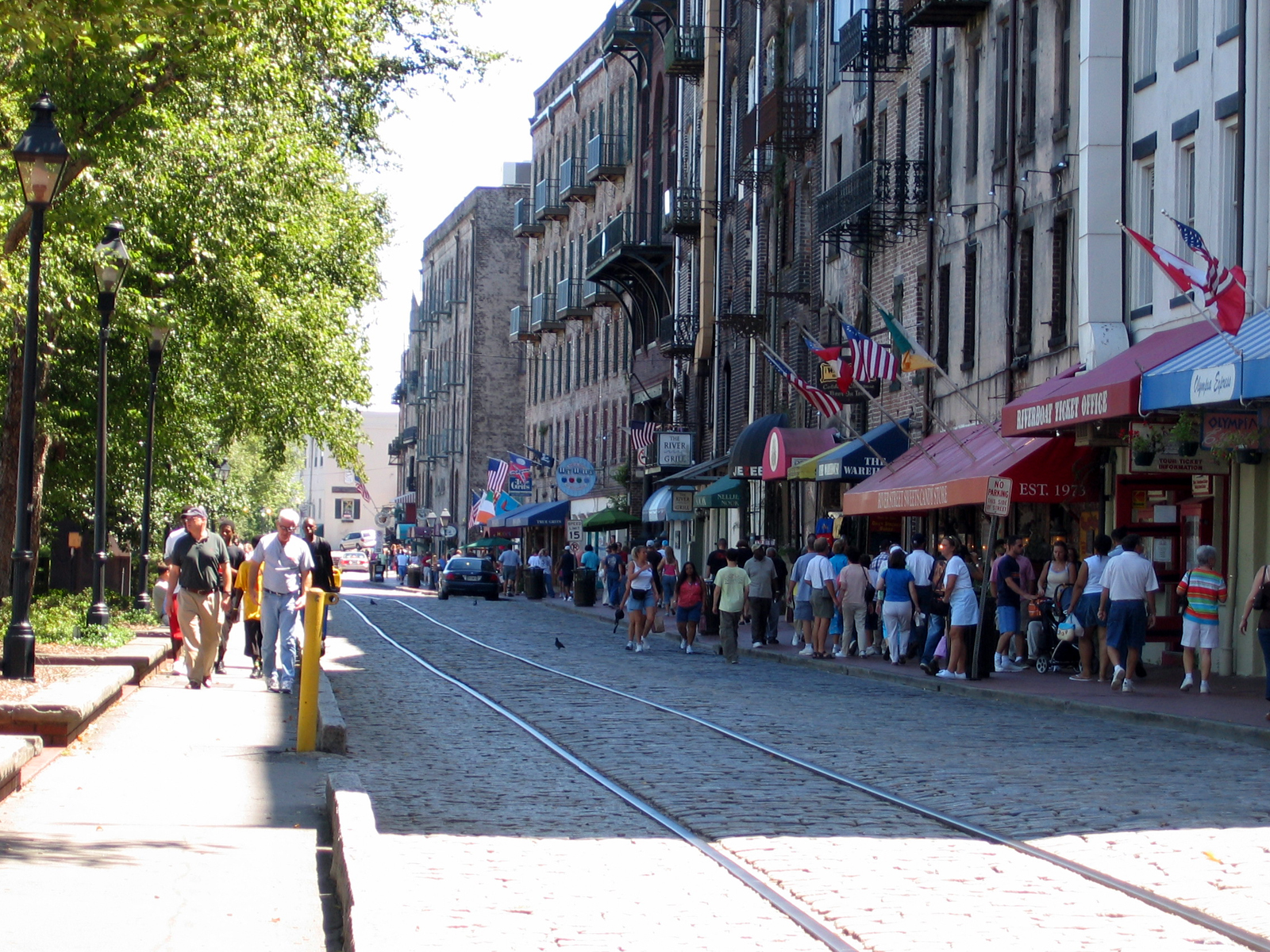
River Street as it appeared on September 10, 2005, with streetcar rails clearly visible. This photo was taken four years before the start of service.

The city of Savannah purchased the River Street Branch line right-of-way from Norfolk Southern in 2004 for approximately $600,000. The streetcar ran along abandoned railroad tracks set in cobblestones on River Street east and west of City Hall.

To provide streetcar service a 1930s-era W5-class streetcar (#756), originally from Melbourne, Australia, was purchased by the city for about $207,000 and converted to power its motors with an onboard biodiesel-fueled generator and batteries as a hybrid drive for an additional $100,000. Hence it is a form of diesel railcar. The streetcar was nicknamed "Dottie'" — a reference to the Savannah DOT that completed the project. The service was introduced during the Climate Action Parade on December 9, 2008. Additional free rides were provided for a day on December 13, 2008. Regular operations started on February 11, 2009.

In 2015, the streetcar operated for only nine days before a mechanical problem on January 16, 2015, caused service to be suspended. This was the last of several long-term shutdowns for maintenance, ultimately leading to an indefinite cessation of service and its replacement by trolley-replica buses. No formal declaration of abandonment was ever published and the Chatham Area Transit website quietly removed all references to the streetcar sometime in 2015.

The car is currently stored at the Georgia State Railroad Museum.

As of 2017, the discontinuation of the streetcar has been addressed on the Savannah DOT website. "You may have noticed that dottie – the River Street Streetcar – is absent from our website. Early in 2016 we had to make a tough decision to suspend the streetcar operation for the remainder of the year. This decision was made in coordination with staff at the City of Savannah who assist with funding and logistics. The planned construction on the West end of River Street will soon interfere with the streetcar track and facility. We examined several alternatives, but eventually concluded that a temporary suspension of the service was the only viable choice. We look forward to a time when we can announce that streetcar service on River Street will resume."

== Schedule and stations ==
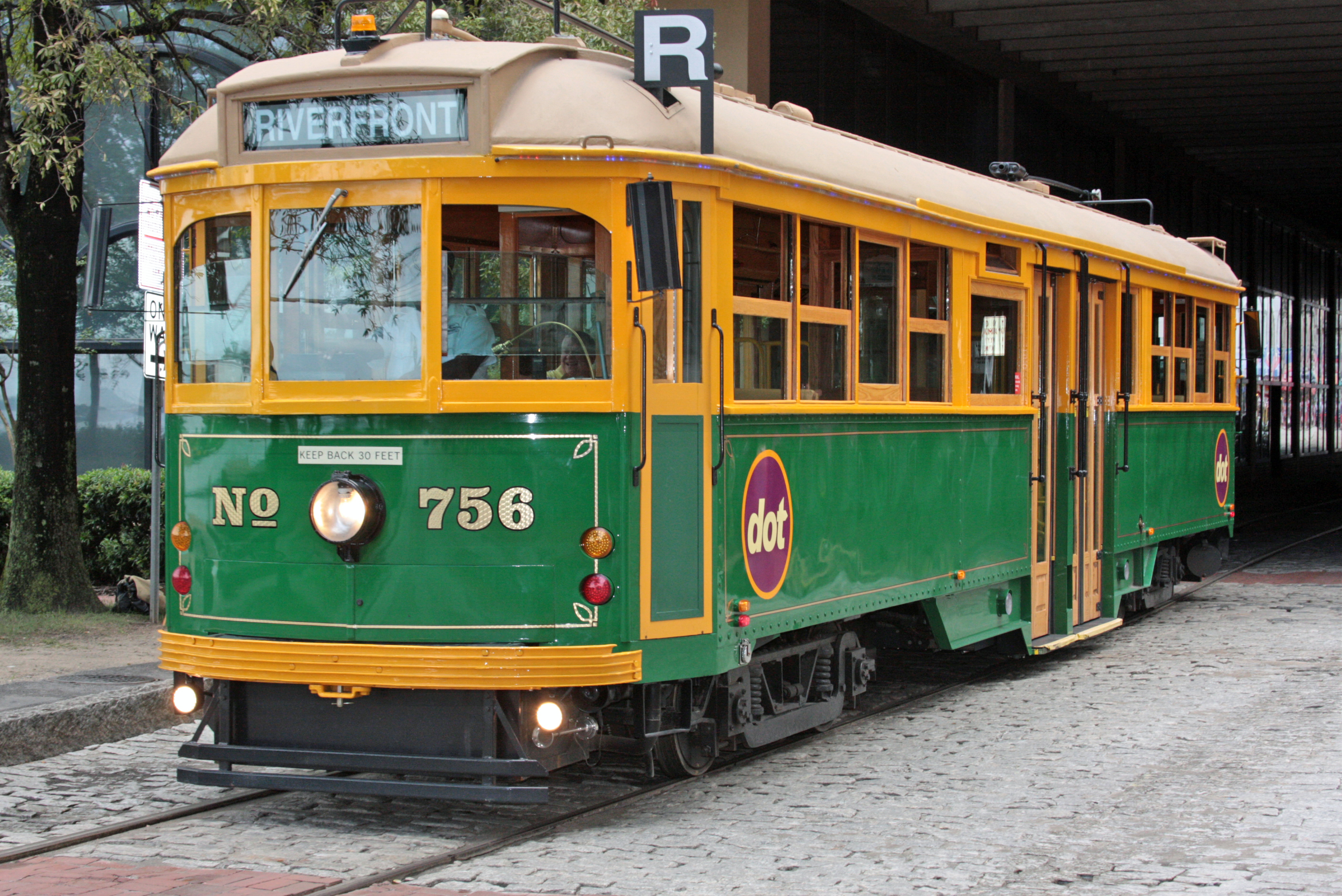
Car 756, "Dottie"

The streetcar operated Thursday through Sunday from noon to 9:00 pm.

From west to east the station stops along the line were:

- Montgomery Street
- Barnard Street
- City Hall – Transit Terminal connection to city buses and the Savannah Belles ferry
- Abercorn Street
- Habersham Street
- East Broad Street – connection to the Savannah Belles ferry to Hutchinson Island from Waving Girl Landing

== Future expansion ==
In the spring of 2009 it was hoped that the operating schedule would be expanded to six days a week and operating hours will be extended hours to 10:00 pm each day.

The River Street Line may be extended to the city's Georgia State Railroad Museum and Visitor Center, provided that Martin Luther King Jr. Boulevard could have new streetcar tracks laid along it. Other new lines have been planned, which most likely will run on abandoned railroad tracks throughout the city, such as on Fahm Street.

== See also ==
- Public transportation in Savannah, Georgia
- Hybrid train
- Georgia State Railroad Museum
- Savannah Historic District
