= Public transportation in Savannah, Georgia =

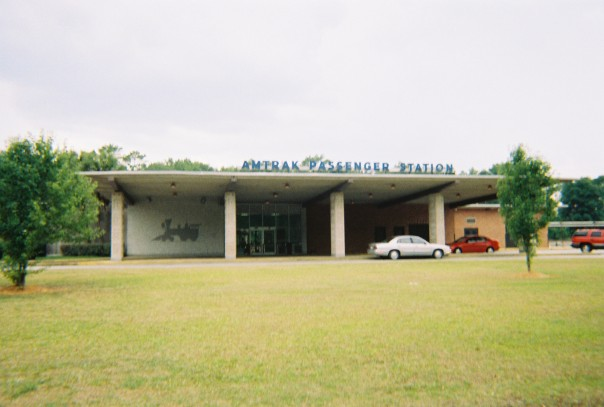
- Savannah's Amtrak station

Overview
- Transit type: Air, rail, road, water

Public transportation in Savannah, Georgia, is available for all four main modes of transport—air, bus, ferry and rail—assisting residents and visitors without their own vehicle to travel around much of Savannah's 113 square miles (290 km^{2}).

Rapid transit throughout Savannah is provided by Chatham Area Transit (CAT), which was established in 1987 as an evolvement of previous providers. There are seventeen fixed bus routes, plus the CAT's dot (downtown transportation) system, which provides fare-free bus service on the Forsyth Loop and Downtown Loop, as well as free passage between River Street and Hutchinson Island via the Savannah Belles Ferry. The privately owned Georgia Queen and Savannah River Queen paddle steamers are also berthed on River Street.

Savannah is home to one commercial airport—Savannah/Hilton Head International Airport—which opened in 1994. Owned by the City of Savannah, it is the operating base for Allegiant Air.

Amtrak operates a passenger rail terminal at Savannah for its Palmetto and Silver Service trains, which run between New York City and Miami. Two southbound and three northbound trains make daily stops at the Savannah terminal.

In 2021, the Savannah Morning News reported that one-third of low- and median-income (LMI) households in the Savannah–Chatham area lacked reliable transportation. This was according to a survey of LMI households from the nonprofit Step Up Savannah. About 15% did not live near access to a bus route, and only 5% walked or biked.

== Air ==
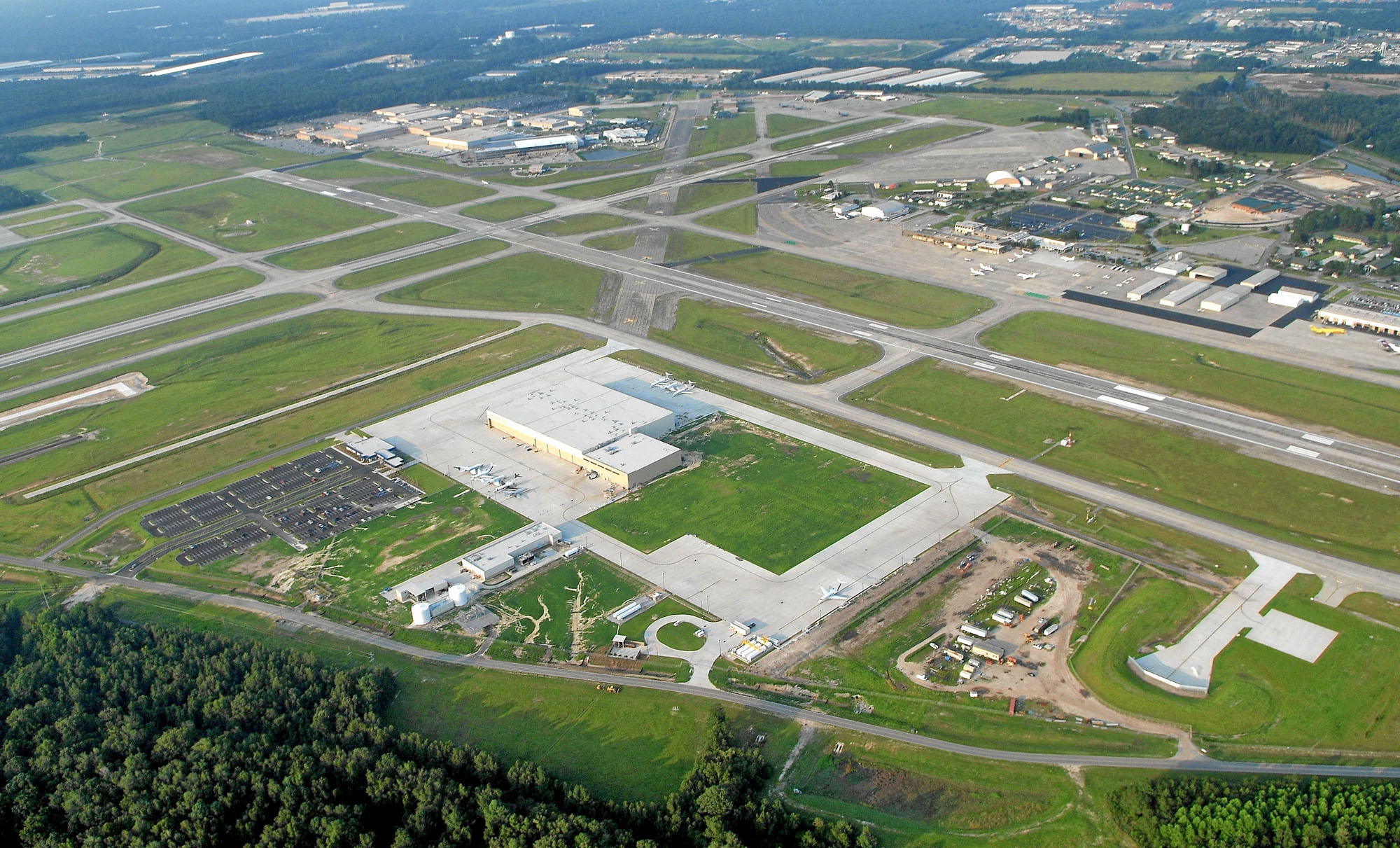
Aerial view of Savannah/Hilton Head International Airport

Savannah/Hilton Head International Airport (ICAO: KSAV), located 8 miles (13 km) northwest of the city, had over 1.3 million commercial passenger boardings in 2019. The airport it is the operating base for Allegiant Air.

Ten airlines serve the airport year-round: Allegiant Air, American Airlines, American Eagle, Avelo Airlines, Breeze Airways, Delta Air Lines, Delta Connection, JetBlue, Southwest Airlines and United Express. Two (Avelo Airlines and Sun Country Airlines) provide seasonal-only services.

Popular destinations include Boston, Chicago; Dallas, New York City and Washington, D.C.

FedEx Express and UPS Airlines also serve the airport for cargo.

== Bus ==
Chatham Area Transit was established in 1987. Its Intermodal Transit Center, opened in 2013 and located on West Oglethorpe Avenue, is named for Joe Murray Rivers Jr., a transit advocate who transformed public transit in Georgia. CAT has a fleet of 60 buses, including six electric fixed-route buses.

=== Fixed-route list ===
There are currently seventeen fixed routes:

- 3: West Chatham / Savannah/Hilton Head International Airport
- 3B: Augusta Ave
- 4: Barnard
- 5: Port Wentworth
- 6: Cross Town
- 10: East Savannah
- 11: Candler
- 12: Henry
- 14: Abercorn
- 17: Silk Hope
- 20: Skidaway Island / Coffee Bluff
- 25: MLK Jr. Blvd
- 27: Waters
- 28: Waters
- 31: Skidaway / Sandfly
- 80: Tiger Shuttle
- 100X: Airport Express

Route 3 serves Groves High School. The 3B provides inbound services in the morning and outbound services in the afternoon. Route 6 runs once per hour during morning and afternoon peak times. Route 7D-C, the dot extension, replaced route 29.

=== Fare-free services ===
There are currently four free downtown (dot) shuttles:

- Forsyth Loop
- Downtown Loop
- 7D-C dot: Cloverdale / Carver Village
- Savannah Belles Ferry

Pooler, Thunderbolt and Port Wentworth opted out of receiving CAT's services upon its 1986 chartering.

== Streetcar ==
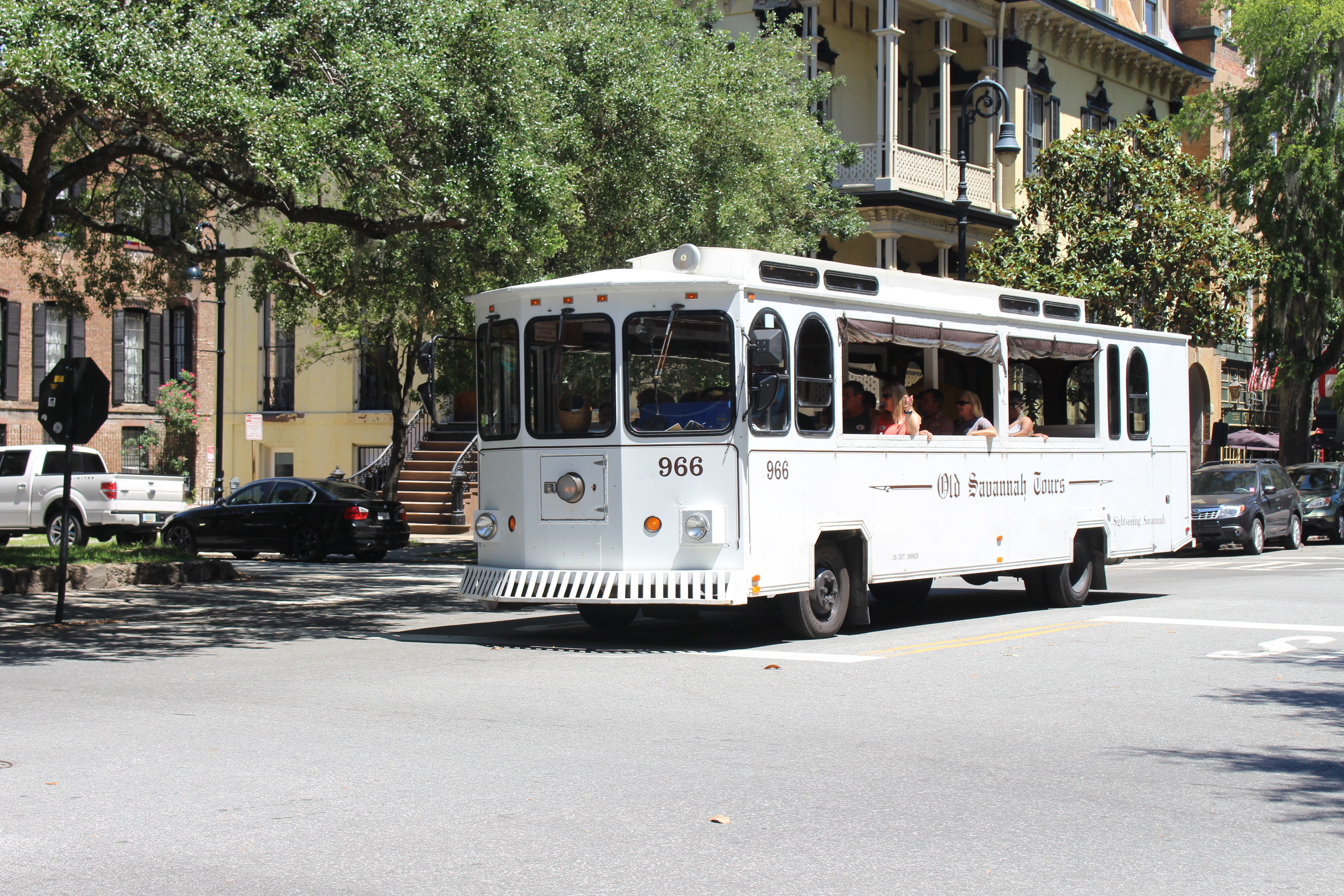
An Old Savannah Tours streetcar on East Liberty Street in 2017

Old Town Trolley Tours operates a hop on, hop off sightseeing tour-bus service around the city. Beginning at Savannah's Visitor Centre on Martin Luther King Jr. Boulevard, its route has fourteen stops: Old Town Trolley Welcome Center (West Boundary Street), Franklin Square, Madison Square, Forsyth Park, Taylor Square, Cathedral of St. John The Baptist (Lafayette Square), Old Town Trolley Barn (West Perry Street), City Market, Lucas Theatre (Reynolds Square), River Street, The Waving Girl (East River Street), Isaiah Davenport House (Columbia Square), Colonial Park Cemetery and Bull Street Corridor.

Elite Savannah Travel, established in 1979 as Old Savannah Tours, runs a competing service.

== Ferry ==
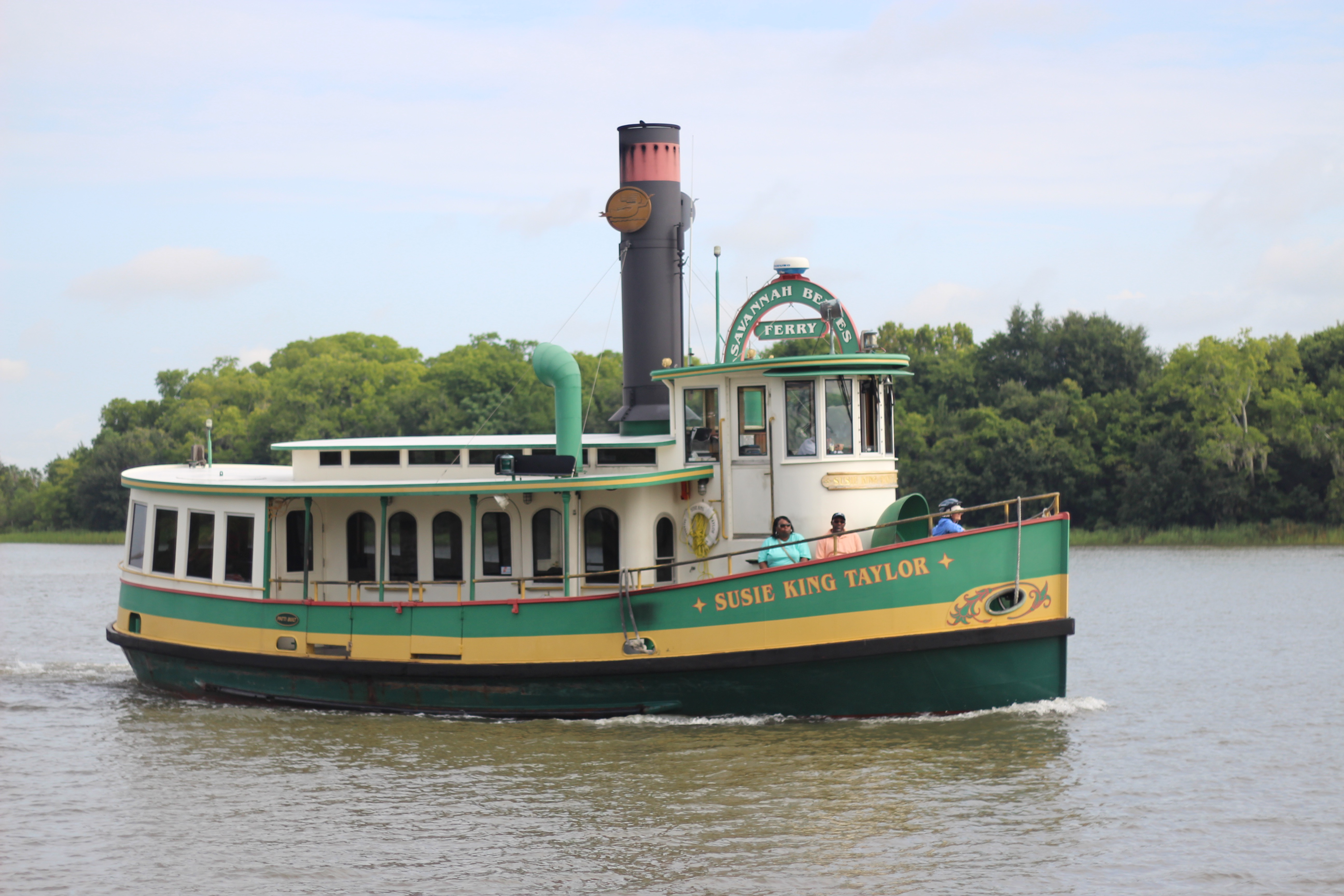
Savannah Belles Ferry's Susie King Taylor in 2016

The Savannah Belles Ferry fleet includes four passenger ferries. They are named for noteworthy women from Savannah's history: Juliette Gordon Low, Susie King Taylor, Florence Martus and Mary Musgrove. Each ferry runs between River Street (from either City Hall or Waving Girl Landing) and Hutchinson Island in the Savannah River. Established in 2000, the ferries are owned and operated by CAT, and run at no cost to the public. They run between 7.00 AM and 10.00 PM, seven days a week.

Savannah River Boat Cruises runs two paddle steamers from River Street: the four-deck Georgia Queen and the three-deck Savannah River Queen.

== Rail ==
Savannah's Amtrak terminal, built in 1962, is served by Amtrak's Palmetto and Silver Service trains, which run between New York City and Miami. Two southbound and three northbound trains make daily stops at the station, which is located around 3 miles (4.8 km) west of downtown.
