= Joe Murray Rivers =

American businessman and advocate (1939–2017

- Born: February 3, 1939; Savannah, Georgia, U.S.
- Died: April 5, 2017 (aged 78); Savannah, Georgia, U.S.
- Resting place: Oak Grove Cemetery, Savannah, Georgia, U.S.

Joseph Murray Rivers (February 3, 1939 – April 5, 2017) was an American businessman and public-transit advocate. He served on the Chatham County Commission beginning in 1985, and served as its commissioner between 1985 and 2004.

The Intermodal Transit Center in Savannah, Georgia, is now named for him.

== Life and career ==
Rivers was born in Savannah, Georgia, in 1939, to Joe Murray Rivers Sr. and Sarah Frazier. Growing up in Savannah's Old Fort neighborhood, near Emmet Park, he attended Savannah's Beach High School, and graduated from the U.S. Air Force Institute (University of Maryland), City College of New York and Savannah State University.

He served in the U.S. Marine Corps and the Merchant Marines.

In business, he co-owned, with his friend James Holmes, the Olympic Sports shop in downtown Savannah, originally located on Drayton Street but later moved to Broughton Street.

Rivers is noted for transforming Savannah's transit system from one of the worst in Georgia to one of America's best, a feat which resulted in his winning an American Public Transportation Association (APTA) Award in 1989. He served as chairman of the Countywide Transit Taskforce between 1985 and 1991, served on the Metropolitan Planning Organization, and served as Region III president from 1991 to 1992. He received a Special Achievement Award from the Coastal Area District Development Authority (CADDA), and served on CADDA's board of directors.

He served on the board of directors for Chatham Area Transit, whose Intermodal Transit Center is now named for Rivers. It opened in 2013.

He wanted to make sure transportation could be provided to all people. He and I used to go to Washington all the time to try to get funding from our legislators — anybody who would listen to us. Joe Murray Rivers was a person who did not give up. For people who did not have means to have a car, he really believed in public transportation.

— James Holmes

== Death ==
Murray died, aged 78, at Savannah's Candler Hospital in April 2017 after a short illness. He was interred in Savannah's Oak Grove Cemetery. He was survived by his fiancée Virgie Williams.

== See also ==
- Public transportation in Savannah, Georgia
