= Chatham Area Transit =

Public transportation provider in Georgia, US

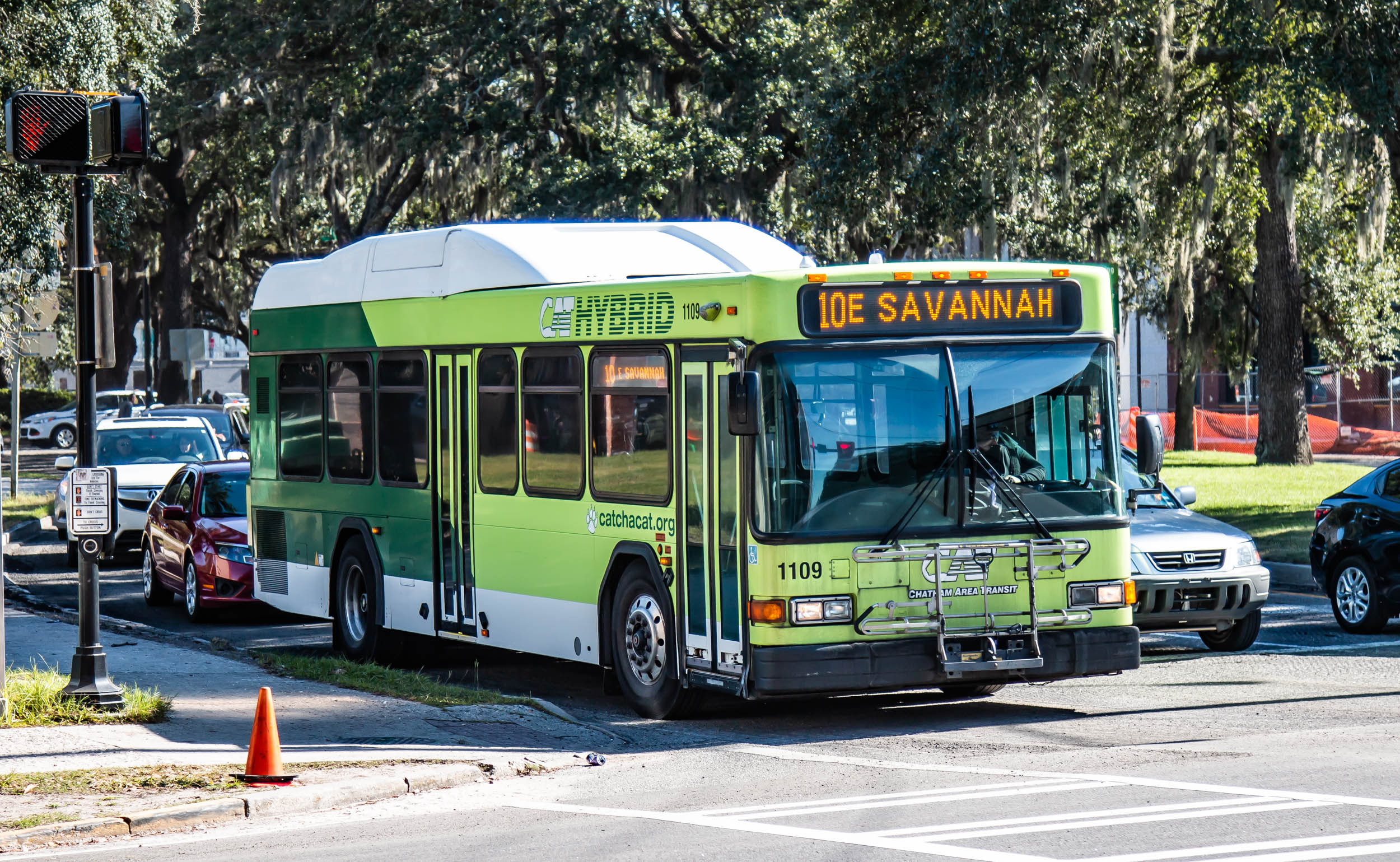
- CAT Route 10 in operation
- Founded: 1986 (40 years ago)
- Headquarters: Chatham Area Transit
- Locale: Savannah, Georgia
- Service area: Chatham County, Georgia
- Service type: Bus, Paratransit, Ferry
- Routes: 17
- Hubs: Joe Murray Rivers Jr. Intermodal Transit Center
- Fleet: 117
- Daily ridership: 17,000 (annual average)
- Fuel type: Diesel, hybrid, electric
- Chief executive: Stephanie Cutter
- Annual budget: $42,072,153 (operating budget)
- Website: http://www.catchacat.org/

The Chatham Area Transit Authority, usually known as Chatham Area Transit or CAT, is the provider of public transportation in the Savannah, Georgia, metropolitan area. The Authority was founded in 1987, evolving from previous transit providers. Services operate seven days a week. CAT also operates the Savannah Belles Ferry, which provides service between downtown Savannah and Hutchinson Island. The downtown shuttles are known as the dot (downtown transportation).

CAT's Intermodal Transit Center, opened in 2013, is named for Joe Murray Rivers Jr., a transit advocate who transformed public transit in Georgia.

CAT is currently embroiled in a lawsuit with Chatham County and is going through a period of extremely poor relations with its workers and their labor union, ATU Local 1324.

== Predecessors and creation ==
Public transportation in Savannah reaches back to 1869, when the Savannah-Skidaway and Seaboard Railway Company was formed to provide intercity streetcar service between Savannah and outlying areas. However, transportation eventually shifted toward bus service, and streetcar operations ceased in 1946. From 1946, the Savannah Transit Company (STC) owned transit operations in Savannah.

In 1961, the Savannah Transit Authority (STA) was created by state legislation to take over operations from the STC. The STA was able to continue operations while breaking even and even occasionally turning a profit until 1986, when discussions began to take place to create a new arrangement following concerns about operating and financial conditions.

The Chatham County Commission created a special district, named the Chatham Area Transit Authority, which was subsequently adopted by the state legislature; the Chatham Area Transit Authority was officially created by state authority on January 9, 1987. The fact that CAT was created by both an act of the Chatham County Commission and the Georgia State Legislature has recently resulted in a dispute regarding which body has ultimate authority over the entity.

== Fixed-route list ==
There are currently 14 fixed routes:

- 3: West Chatham
- 3B: Augusta Ave / Garden City / Hudson Hill
- 4: Barnard
- 5: Port Wentworth (Service started 2024)
- 6: Cross Town
- 10: East Savannah
- 11: Candler
- 12: Henry
- 14: Abercorn Local
- 17: Silk Hope
- 25: MLK Jr. Blvd / Westlake Apartments
- 27: Waters
- 28: Waters
- 31: Skidaway / Sandfly

== Fare-free services ==
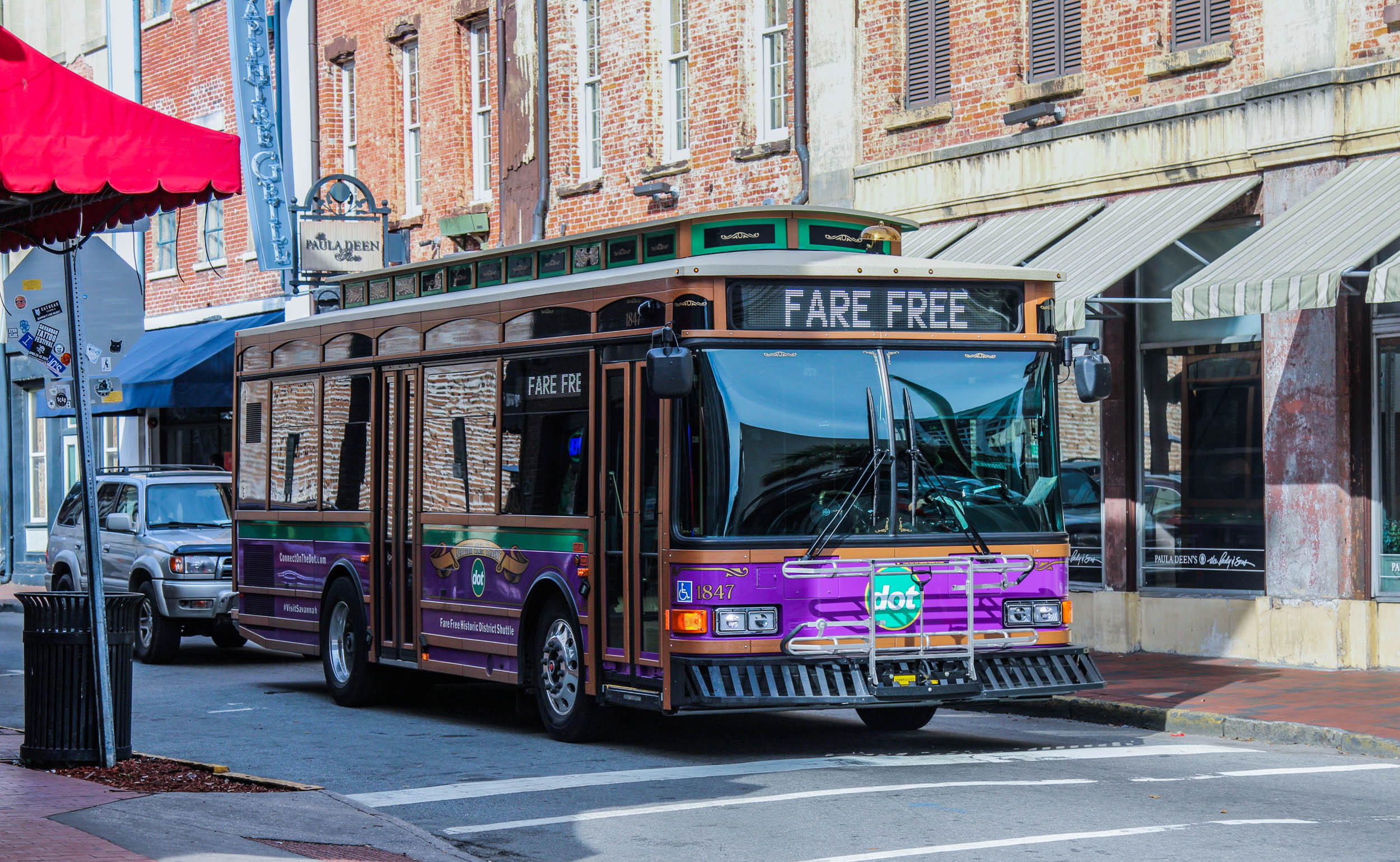
dot shuttle on West Congress St

There are currently three free downtown (dot) shuttles:

- Forsyth Loop
- Downtown Loop
- Savannah Belles Ferry

The Downtown Loop was amended in January 2022 to incorporate sections of Abercorn Street, East Liberty Street and East Oglethorpe Avenue, with new stops added at Price and East Liberty Streets and East Broad Street near East Bryan Street. It would no longer serve the eastern end of Bryan and Congress Streets. In 2026, the City of Savannah voted to extend CAT's contract to operate the dot service for another three years, and proposed to expand the service to additional areas. Concerns about the equity of the service were raised but not addressed, while concerns about service reliability were balanced by contractual provisions that fine CAT for performance failures.

In January 2024, CAT began a four-month pilot program offering students fare-free rides around Chatham County. It replaces a 50% discount program. Some parents had concerns that their children would be sharing buses with the general population.

Pooler, Thunderbolt and Port Wentworth opted out of receiving CAT's services upon its 1986 chartering.

== CAT bike share program ==
CAT launched a bike share program on January 24, 2014, advertising the program as a "fun and sustainable transportation alternative". Bike stations were located at the Joe Murray Rivers, Jr. Intermodal Transit Center and at Ellis Square. However, on December 31, 2018, CAT discontinued its bikeshare program citing market changes, low participation, and lack of funding.

== Recent history ==
==== Chadwick Reese kickback scheme ====
On December 15, 2015, the CAT board voted to terminate CEO Chadwick Reese and Director of Maintenance Joel Morris over a federal indictment in relation to a bribery and kickback scheme. Allegedly, Morris approached Reese saying that a specific vendor would be used to clean buses, while also saying that "a gentleman would take care of" them. The Department of Justice released a statement saying that, in exchange for the CAT contract, the contractor had performed work on the personal residences of Reese and Morris worth over $100,000. Despite little or no work performed for CAT under the contract, the contractor was paid over $200,000.

==== Controversy over termination of Bacarra Mauldin ====
In January 2021, the CAT board voted to terminate CEO Bacarra Mauldin, a surprise decision which was criticized by members of Amalgamated Transit Union (ATU) Local 1324, the union which represents CAT transit workers. Initially, the CAT board stated that they had "lost confidence" in Mauldin's ability to lead the organization, while a minority of board members voted against the termination and called for structural change. The decision caused turmoil in the CAT board, and the board voted to remove its vice-chair from his position after he spoke out publicly against the termination. After her termination, Mauldin filed a whistleblower lawsuit against CAT, claiming that she was terminated after she raised concerns regarding violation of federal regulations. In response, CAT's attorneys claimed that Mauldin was terminated for excessive spending. Mauldin eventually dropped the lawsuit. Mauldin was later terminated from a leadership position with the Memphis Area Transit Authority for similar reasons.

==== 2023 controversy over operator safety and uninsured vehicles ====
Following the hiring of CEO Faye DiMassimo in February 2022, the agency stated that public safety would be balanced with riders' needs. In October 2023, the agency acknowledged an issue with indecent exposure and sexual assault on its buses, with DiMassimo stating that "it happens from time to time." In April 2024, months after launching CAT Connect and CAT SMART, DiMassimo acknowledged that vehicles used for the projects had been operated without insurance as required by state law. DiMassimo had managed the launch of those services. DiMassimo resigned her position as CEO in May 2024, but still serves on the CAT board as an appointee of the local legislative delegation.

==== 2025 security concerns ====
On June 16, 2025, a passenger and operator were violently assaulted on a CAT bus, resulting in the hospitalization of the operator; the suspect in the attack had 43 prior arrests. On June 21, 2025, a man was stabbed on a CAT bus following a dispute with another passenger. Following the killing of Iryna Zarutska in nearby Charlotte, North Carolina, which occurred soon after these attacks, CAT faced questions regarding its security program. CAT officials stated that measures to prevent future assaults included increased security staffing and use of facial recognition technology.

==== 2025 state intervention and dispute ====
In May 2025, Republican Governor Brian Kemp signed a law which dissolved the Chatham Area Transit Board of Directors, reconstituting it with a changed structure and composition and reducing the influence of the Chatham County Commission. The move was opposed by the sitting Board of Directors as well as Chatham County Chairman Chester Ellis, who filed a lawsuit to overturn the law. While local legislators and business leaders described the CAT board as "parochial" and "saddled with a history of dysfunction," Ellis and his supporters reportedly viewed the move as an attempt to suppress the Black community, whose interests are represented by the County and disregarded by the City, which is more focused on tourists and populations within the City which are white, rich, and young. On July 8, 2025, the court case against the new board, which includes seats for business and tourism groups, was appealed to the state supreme court after an initial lawsuit was dismissed just days prior.

On August 23, 2025, the Chatham County Commission passed a resolution to nullify the state legislature's law seeking to dissolve and reconstitute the CAT board, despite the fact that the new board had already been seated and had been conducting business. The resolution described the new board as "unconstitutionally created."

In November 2025, Ellis expressed the intention to withdraw county involvement in CAT, which was met with surprise from some other members of the Chatham County Commission.

==== Leadership of Stephanie Cutter and subsequent controversies ====
On February 25, 2026, the Chatham Area Transit Board of Directors named Stephanie Cutter as the Authority's new CEO. Cutter had served in the role in an acting capacity since June 2024 and had previously served as CAT's Chief Financial Officer. The move came as CAT was under scrutiny from Chatham County for alleged financial misconduct. ATU Local 1324 leadership described Cutter as "not labor-friendly" and cited concerns about misuse of public funds. ATU Local 1324 President Donya Swinton said that the state of the transit agency is "the worst we have ever been".

In June 2026, Cutter publicly clashed with Ellis, with both accusing each other of being untruthful. Ellis stated that an audit of CAT's finances found "serious problems" and recommended withholding any funding increases for CAT. Additionally, the Chatham County Commission blocked the expansion of the CAT service district to Port Wentworth, citing concerns about the legality of the May 2025 CAT board change. Ellis also stated that Chatham County is looking for a replacement paratransit service provider.

In September 2026, CAT suspended 21 of its 56 drivers without pay when they failed to enroll in a newly implemented fingerprint time clock system, leading to service disruptions, and warned them they could be terminated from employment. CAT had already been facing staffing challenges, with ATU Local 1324 leadership stating that there were 98 total budgeted driver positions. Union leadership stated that the change was made without following the correct procedures, and accused Cutter of "bullying" behavior. By Tuesday, September 22, 2026, 27 drivers had been suspended without pay. However, by Wednesday, September 23, 2026, 25 of the 27 suspended drivers had enrolled in the new system and returned to work. A spokesperson for CAT stated that the contract with the union granted CAT "exclusive control" of business operations and stated that the changes had been discussed with labor representatives.

At the CAT Board meeting on October 27, 2026, over a dozen activists and union workers protested, with some holding signs advocating against Cutter and the current Board. In an interview, Swinton stated that workers are still experiencing difficulties and that Cutter does not hold herself to the same standard as her employees.

On November 16, 2026, Swinton announced a vote of no confidence in CAT leadership among workers; 99 per cent of workers voted no confidence in the leadership of Cutter and Chief Operating Officer Emmanuel Twumasi. ATU International President John Costa stated that CAT leadership is "not treating their workers who move this community with the dignity and respect they deserve" and that the situation "needs a response immediately." However, CAT released a contrary statement to media, saying, "employees have expressed support for CAT leadership." Swinton further said that Cutter cares about her own safety and that of CAT's headquarters, but does not care about operator safety. CAT is withholding wage increases for operators unless they give up rights to retroactive pay since the expiration of the previous union contract.

== See also ==
- Public transportation in Savannah, Georgia
- Savannah Belles Ferry
