= PS Georgia Queen =

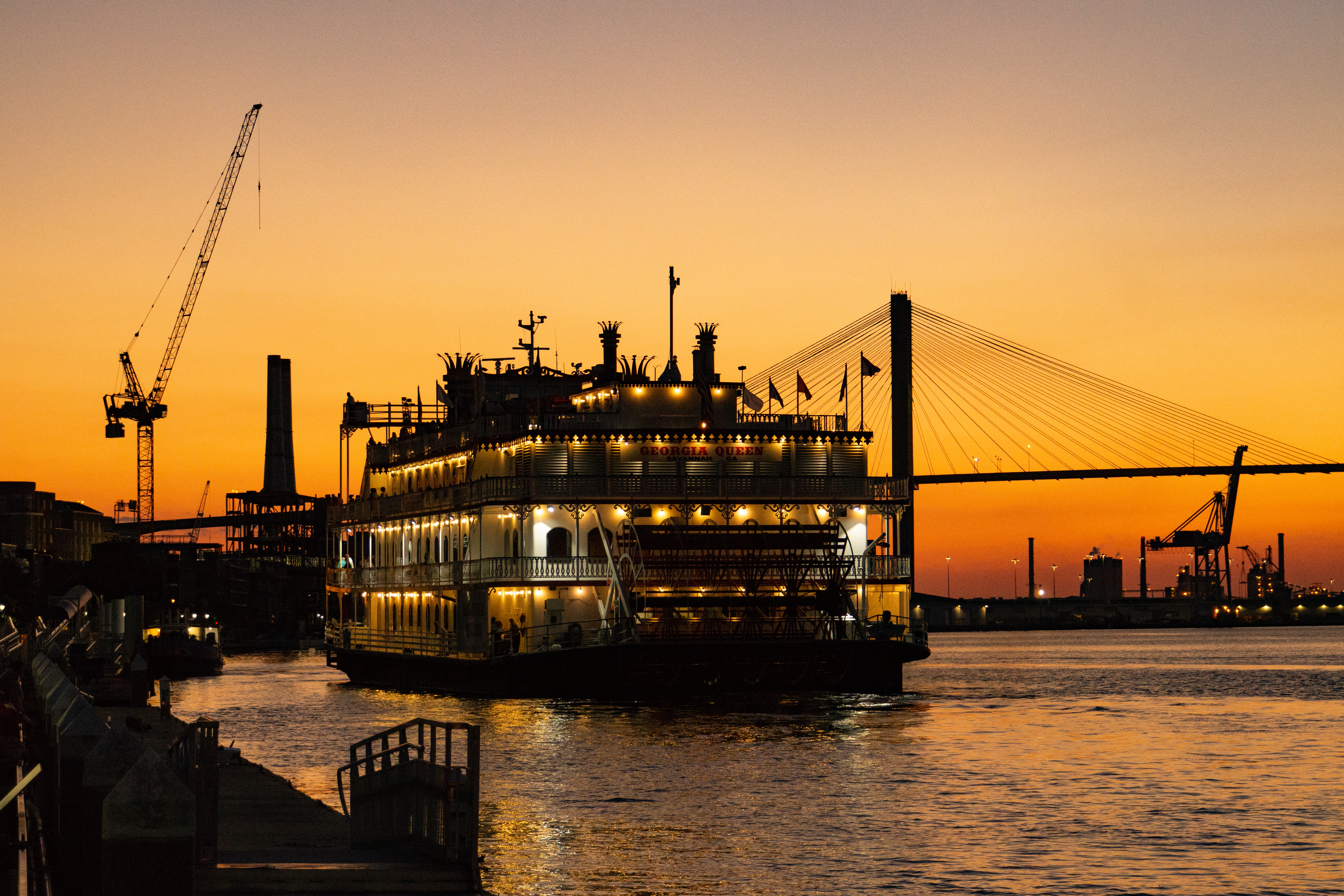
- The Georgia Queen in 2018

History

United States
- Name: Georgia Queen
- Owner: Savannah Riverboat Cruises
- Operator: Savannah Riverboat Cruises
- Completed: 1995 (31 years ago)
- Status: Operational

General characteristics
- Type: Paddle steamer
- Decks: 4

PS Georgia Queen is a paddle steamer in Savannah, Georgia, United States. It is the largest riverboat in operation in the country. Berthed beside Savannah's River Street, the vessel, which was completed in 1995, has four decks.

The vessel was purchased by Savannah Riverboat Cruises in 2016, having formerly served on the Mississippi River in Louisville, Kentucky. It replaced a 32-year-old vessel of the same name, which was sold to Louisville Metro and renamed.

The vessel can carry one thousand passengers. It is 230 feet (70 m) long, 64 feet (20 m) wide and 68 feet (21 m) tall.

Its sister vessel is the three-deck Savannah River Queen.

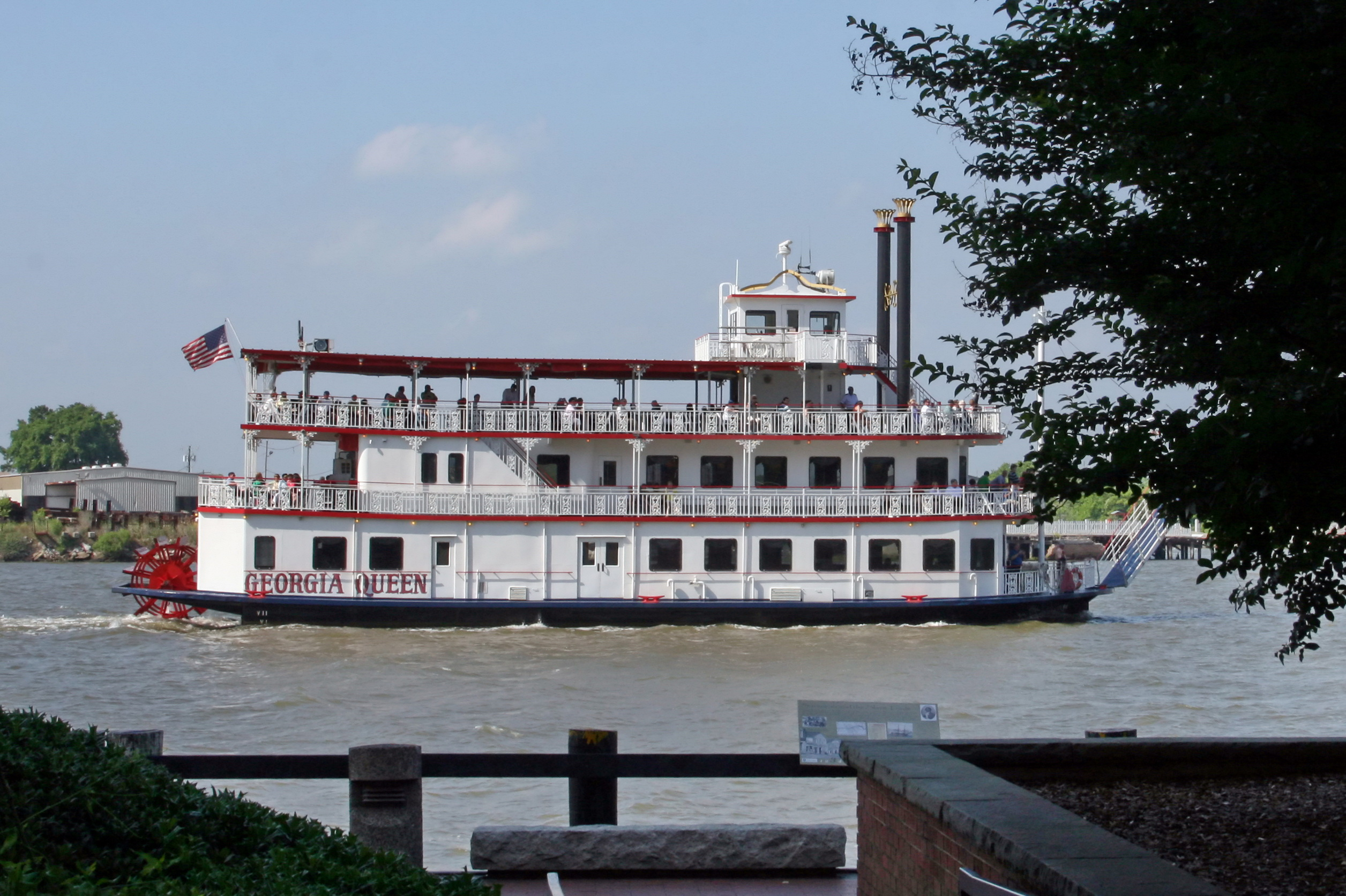
The previous incarnation of the Georgia Queen, pictured in 2010, now in service in Louisville, Kentucky

== See also ==
- Public transportation in Savannah, Georgia
