= Savannah Belles Ferry =

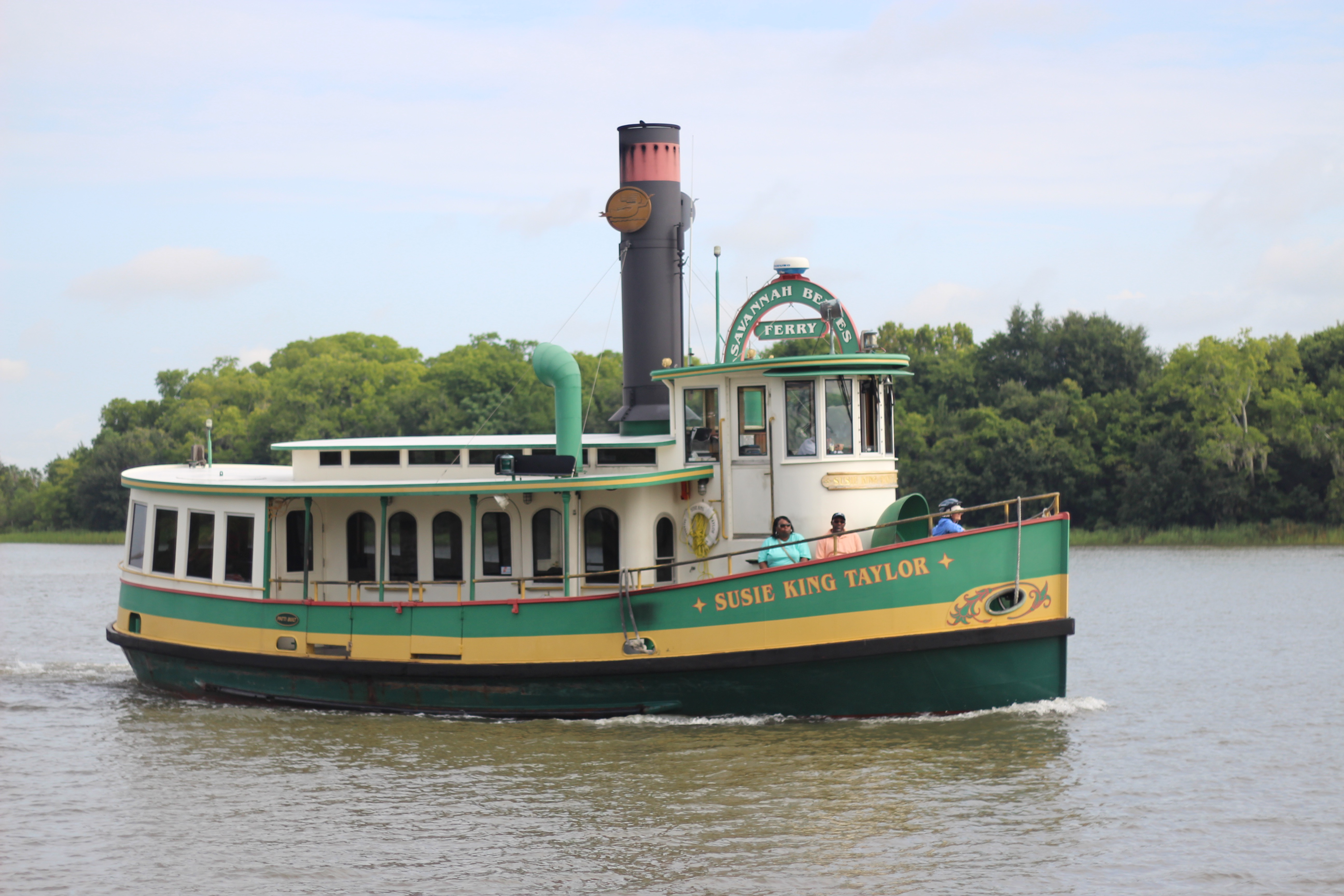
- The Susie King Taylor in 2016

History

United States
- Name: Savannah Belles Ferry
- Owner: Chatham Area Transit
- Operator: Chatham Area Transit
- Completed: 2000 (26 years ago)
- Status: Operational

General characteristics
- Type: Ferry
- Decks: 1

The Savannah Belles Ferry is a passenger ferry in Savannah, Georgia, United States, which runs between Savannah's River Street (from City Hall or from Waving Girl Landing) and Hutchinson Island in the Savannah River. Established in 2000, they are owned and operated by Chatham Area Transit (CAT), and are fare-free. The ferries run between 7.00 AM and 10.00 PM, seven days a week.

The vessels are named for four noteworthy women from Savannah's history: Juliette Gordon Low, Susie King Taylor, Florence Martus and Mary Musgrove.

In both 2019 and 2020, CAT was awarded two grants from the Federal Transit Administration for a new ferries, increasing its total to six.

Between 2001 and 2011, passenger boardings increased from 289,000 to 539,000. They operate 362 days a year (not on Christmas Day, Thanksgiving or New Year's), but cannot operate in fog or lightning.

In 2025, two new waterjet hybrid ferries were added to the fleet. The vessels were the first of their kind in operation in the United States. A ceremony to mark the arrival of the new vessels was held on June 5, 2025. However, in late 2025, concerns from Chatham County came to a head, including excessive costs from the ferry system. Amid a larger budget shortfall, the Chatham Area Transit board was reported to be considering a reduction in service for the ferry service.

== See also ==
- Public transportation in Savannah, Georgia
