= Old Harbor Light (Savannah, Georgia) =

Lighthouse in Georgia, United States

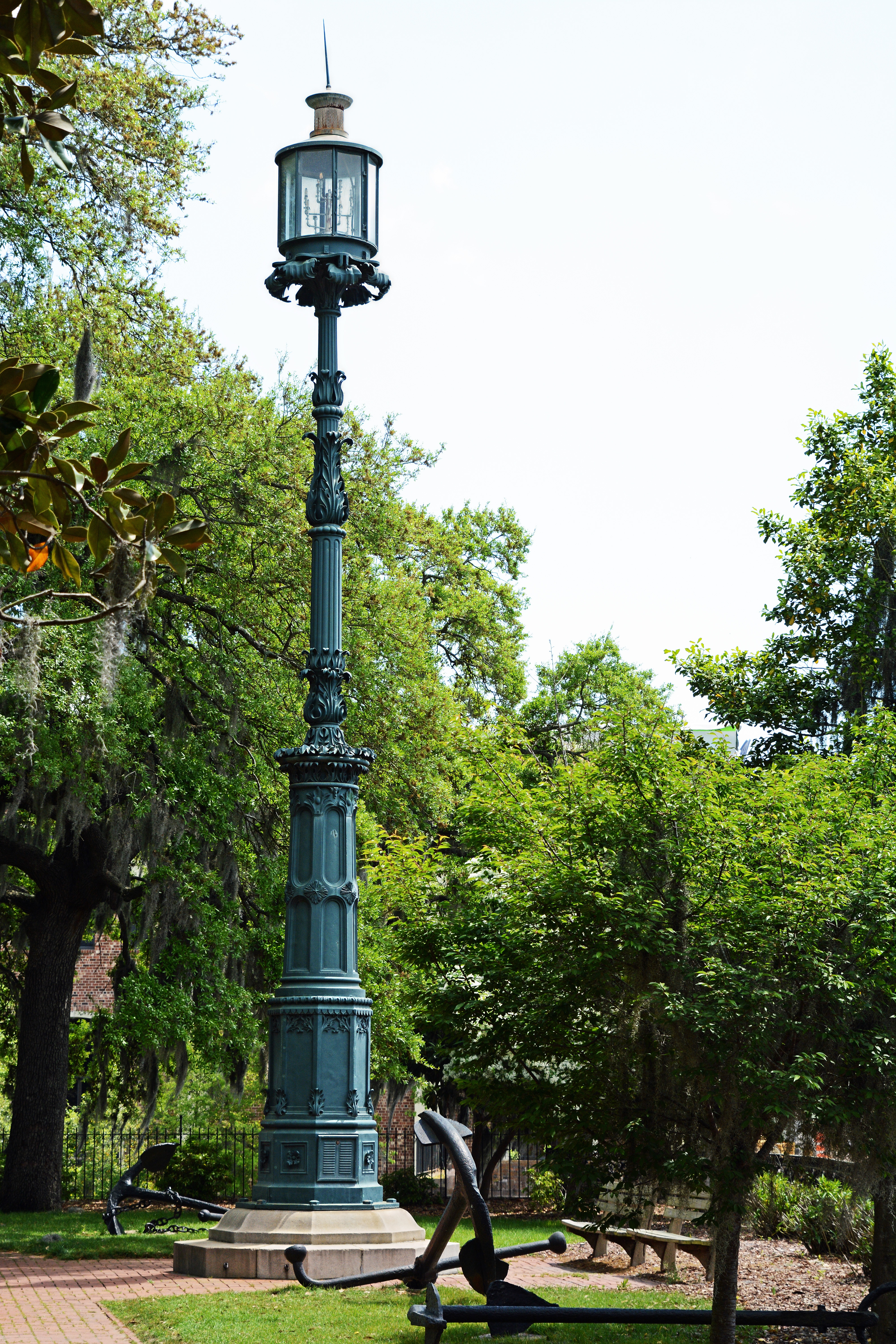
- Location: Emmett Park, Savannah, Georgia, United States
- Coordinates: 32.07932°N 81.08429°W

Tower
- Constructed: 1858; 168 years ago
- Construction: cast iron
- Height: 25 feet (7.6 m)
- Shape: shaft
- Markings: dark green
- Heritage: National Register of Historic Places contributing property

Light
- Deactivated: 1880
- Focal height: 77 feet (23.5 m)
- Old Harbor Light
- U.S. National Historic Landmark District – Contributing property
- Part of: Savannah Historic District (Savannah, Georgia) (ID66000277)
- Added to NRHP: November 13, 1966; 59 years ago

The Old Harbor Light, which is also known as the Savannah Harbor Rear Range Light or the Beacon Range Light, is a former aid to navigation in Emmet Park on East Bay Street in Savannah, Georgia. The light has the appearance of a giant street light. It is within the boundaries of Savannah Historic District and was erected by the federal government in 1858, contemporary with most of the structures in the district.

== History ==
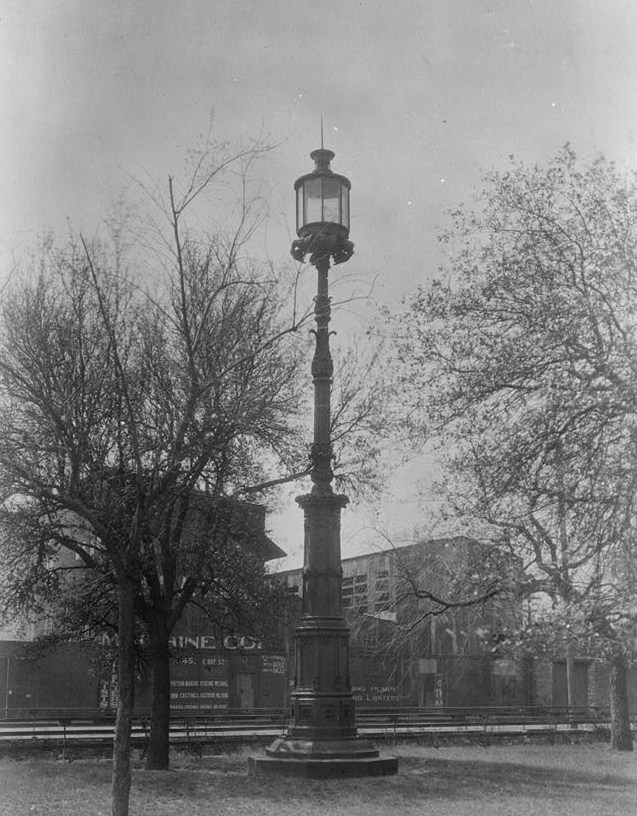
Old Harbor Beacon in 1934

The light was erected by the United States Lighthouse Board in 1858 as the rear range light with the front light on Fig Island to guide ships into the Savannah Harbor and avoid the six British ships, which were scuttled in 1779 to impede French and American ships during the Revolutionary War.

The light was moved a few feet south in 1869. The light was refurbished in 1929. It was turned off during World War II.

In 1958, the Trustees Garden Club developed the eastern portion of Emmet Park. At that time, the light was in poor shape due to salt water corrosion and was stabilized with cables.

Restoration of the Old Harbor Light was planned as part of a major project to restore Savannah's monuments. With contributions of $125,000 from the Savannah Morning News and CSX Corporation, the light was taken down in 2000 and moved to a nearby fabricator. Rust was removed by chemical treatment, repairs were made, it was repainted, and the light was cleaned. It was re-erected and relit on January 11, 2001.

== Design ==
The light has a cast iron shaft and resembles a giant street light. It is 25 feet (7.6 m) tall with a focal plane 77 feet (23.5 m) above the river. It may have been imported from England or France.

It is reported to have originally been a red light. It is now lit with a decorative gas light.
