= Emmet Park =

Public park in Savannah, Georgia

- The Strand; Irish Green (former name)
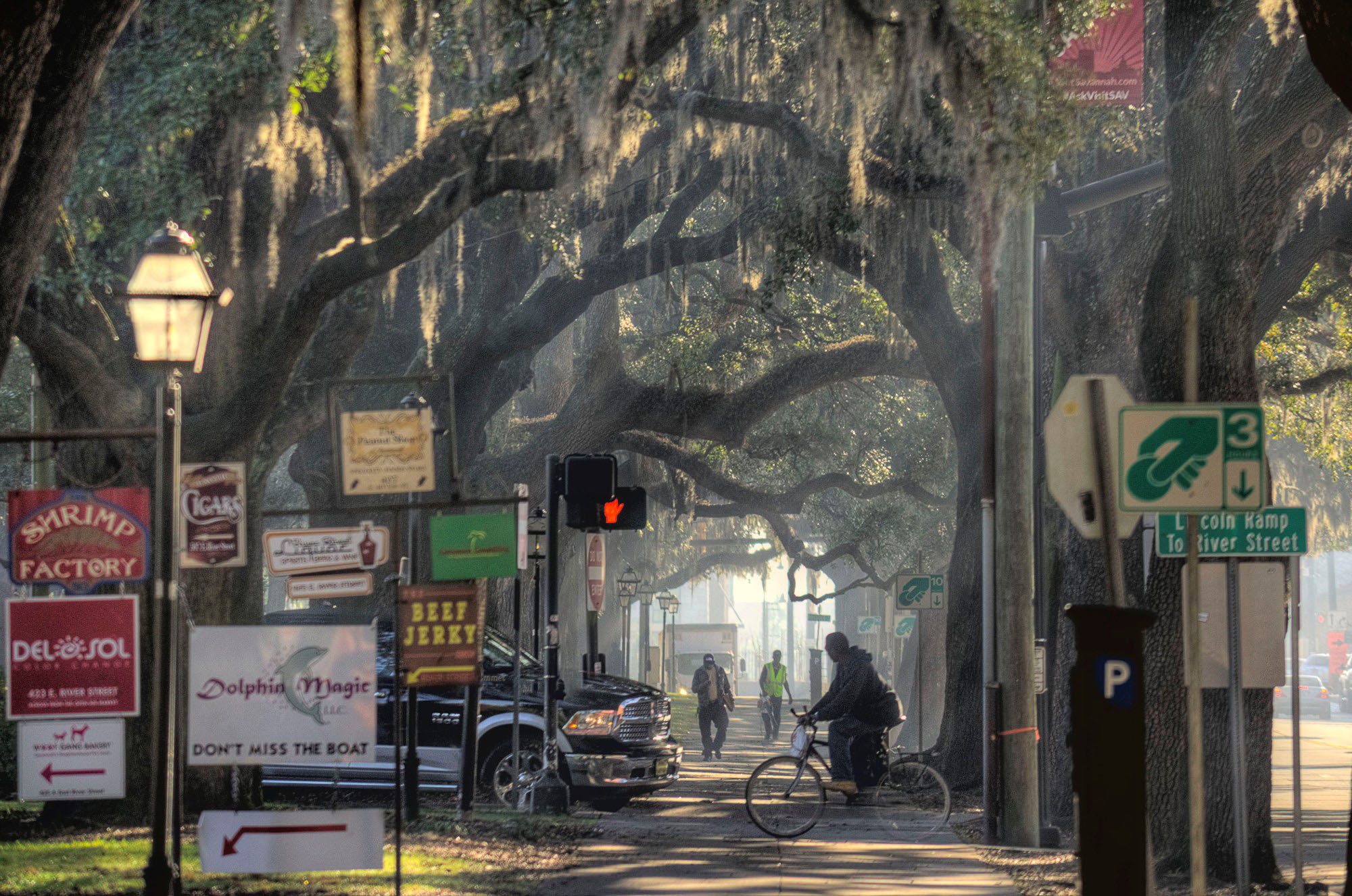
- A 2016 view of the row of live oak trees between the park and East Bay Street, looking east from the Rossiter Place exit onto East Bay Street
- Interactive map of Emmet Park
- Type: Urban park
- Location: Savannah, Georgia, United States
- Coordinates: 32.0798681°N 81.086056°W
- Area: 4.55 acres (0.0184 km^{2}; 0.00711 mi^{2})
- Elevation: 32.8 feet (10.0 m)
- Owner: City of Savannah

Emmet Park, also known as The Strand, is an urban park in Savannah, Georgia, United States. Its most prominent section is located in the northeastern corner of the city's historic downtown area, in what was known as the Old Fort neighborhood, it continues in a dotted fashion for around 0.6 miles (0.97 km) west along Bay Street to its intersection with Jefferson Street. Monuments occupy several of the individual sections.

== History ==
Formerly known as the Irish Green, established with the help of Wexford native William Kehoe, the park was named in 1902 for Irish orator Robert Emmet, in commemoration of the centennial of his death, although Emmet did not visit Savannah during his life.

Five memorials stand in Emmet Park: an Irish Celtic Cross memorial, a Vietnam War veterans memorial, a Korean War memorial, a Chatham Artillery memorial and a memorial to Dr. Noble Wimberly Jones.

Old Harbor Light also stands in the park, at its eastern extremity. It was erected in 1858.

The park is a focal point for Savannah's Saint Patrick's Day celebration, one of the country's largest after Boston.

== Live oaks ==
The live oak trees that line the sidewalk between The Strand and Bay Street were first planted in 1857. They replaced rows of Chinaberry trees that were planted in the late 18th century.

== Gallery ==
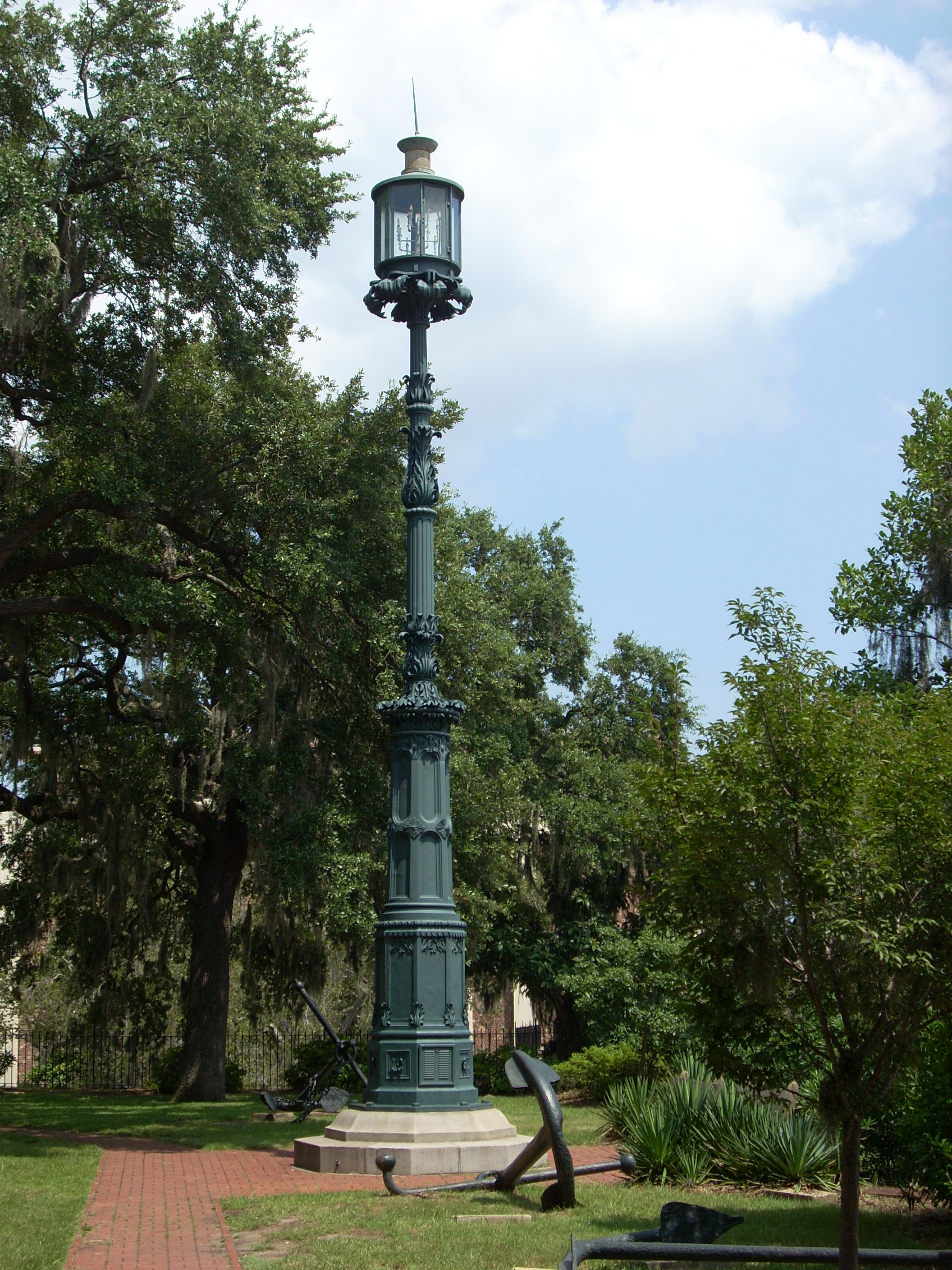
Old Harbor Light

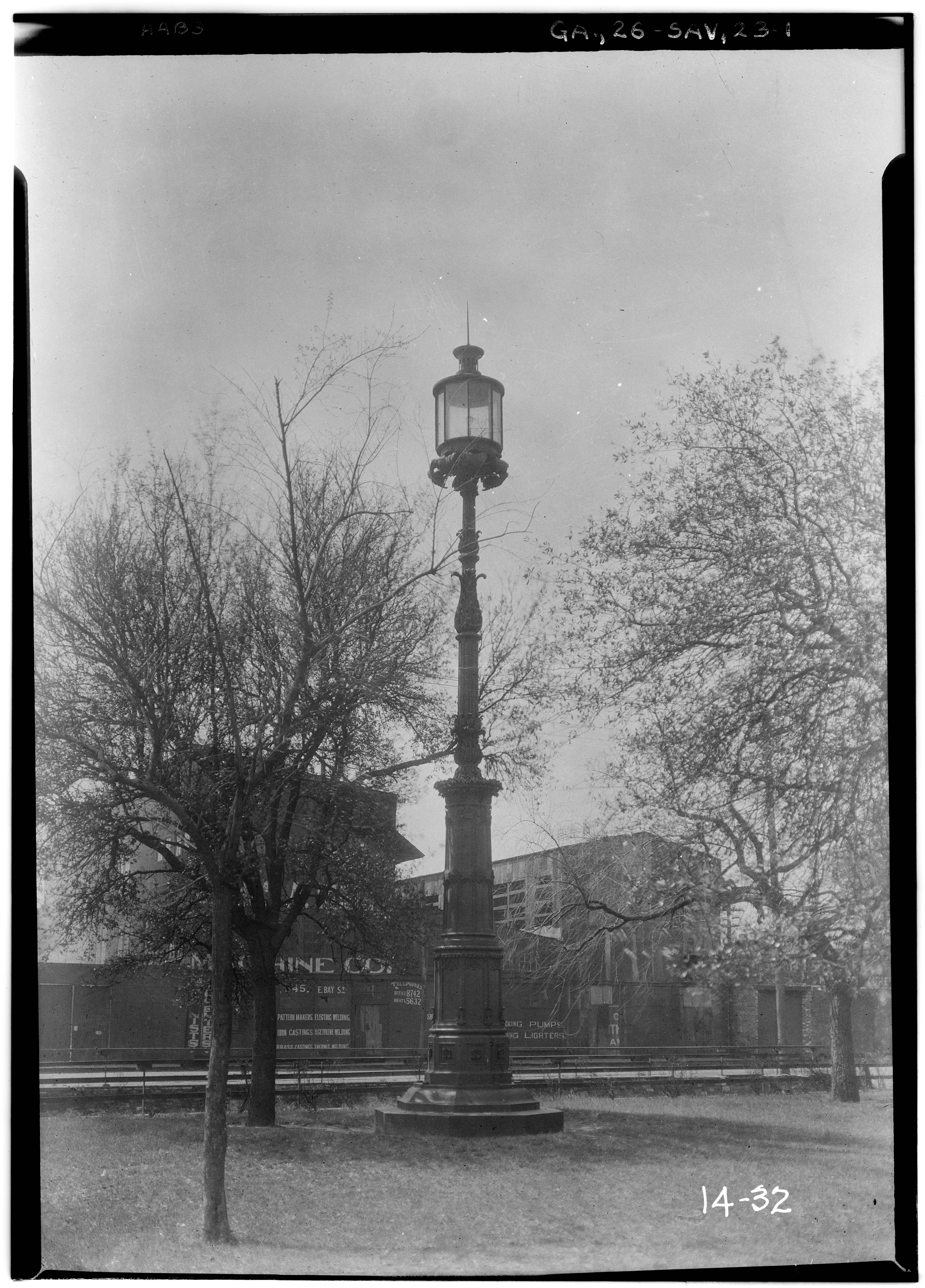
The light in 1934, looking southwest across the park
