= Old Fort (Savannah, Georgia) =

Coordinates: 32.0794873°N 81.08622651°W

- Neighborhood
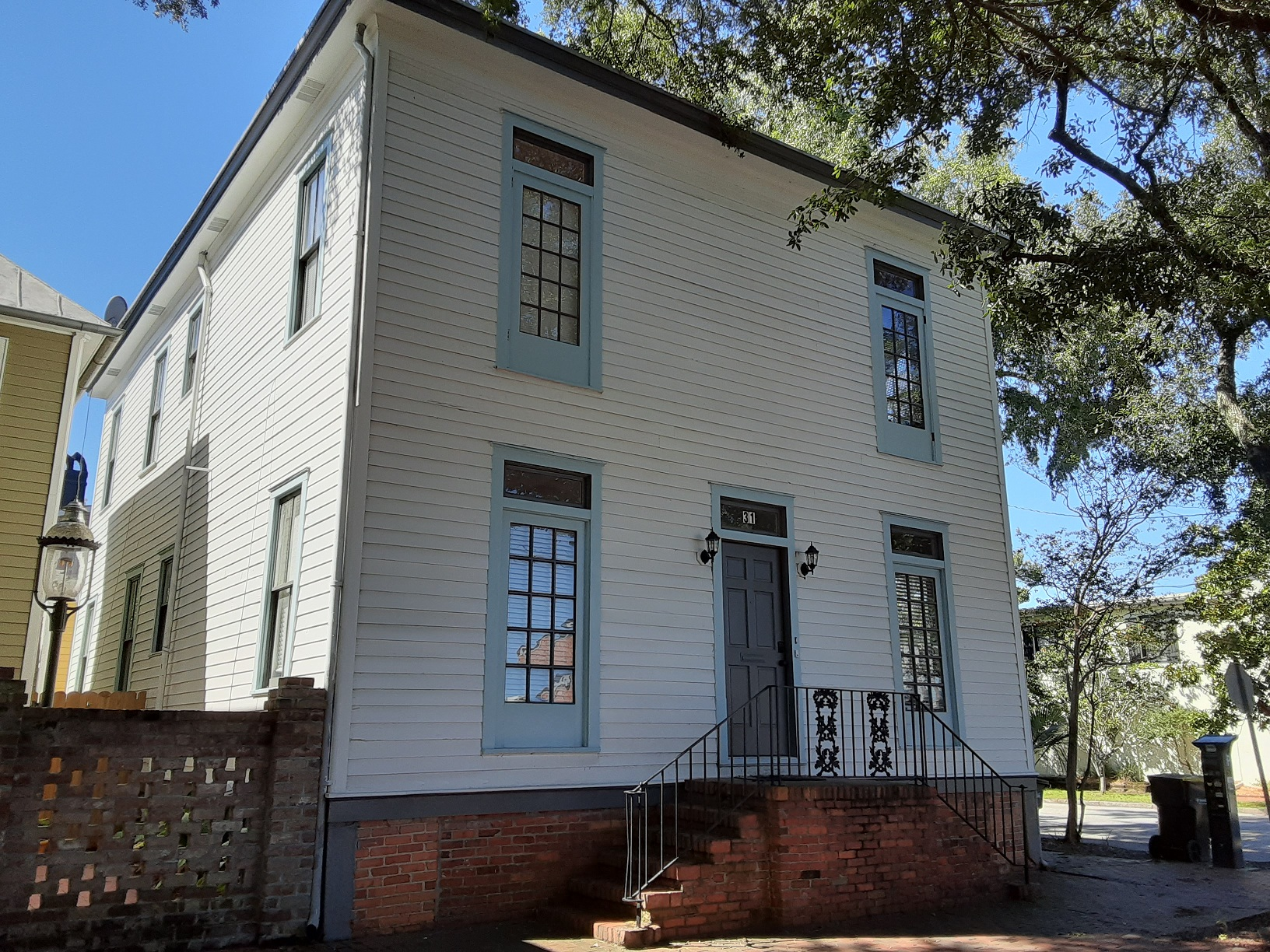
- 31 East Broad Street, in Washington Square, was built in 1860
- Interactive map of Old Fort
- Country: United States
- State: Georgia
- County: Chatham County
- City: Savannah
- ZIP Code: 31401

Old Fort is a historic neighborhood of Savannah, Georgia. Named for Fort Wayne, which stood nearby, it is located in the northeastern corner of the Savannah Historic District, centered around Washington Square and also formerly incorporating the land to the Savannah River, below Bay Street. Today part of Hitch Village, in the early 19th century it was home to the working-class Irish and African American populations of the city.

The neighborhood was substantially shrunk through development of the 1950s.

St. James African Methodist Episcopal (AME) Church, on East Broad Street, is part of the Old Fort district.

== See also ==
- Emmet Park
