= Susie King Taylor =

First black nurse during the American Civil War (1848-1912)

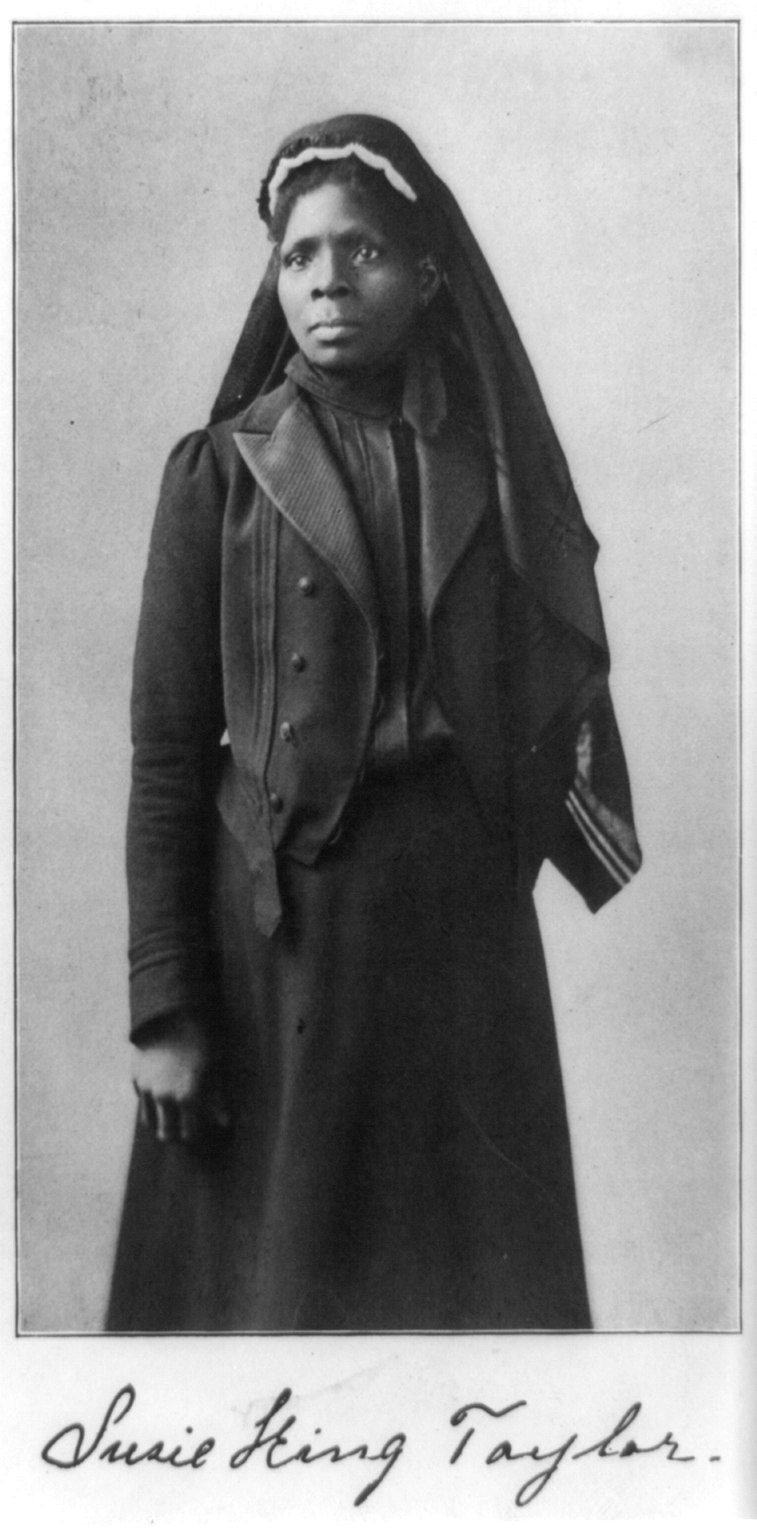
- Taylor in 1902
- Born: Susan Ann Baker; August 6, 1848; Liberty County, Georgia, U.S.
- Died: October 6, 1912 (aged 64)
- Resting place: Mount Hope Cemetery, Roslindale, Massachusetts, U.S.
- Known for: Being the first Black nurse during the American Civil War
- Spouse(s): Edward King (m. 1837; died 1866) Russell L. Taylor (m. 1879; died 1901)

Susie King Taylor (August 6, 1848 – October 6, 1912) was an American nurse, educator, and memoirist. Born into slavery in coastal Georgia, she is known for being the first African-American nurse during the American Civil War. Beyond her aptitude in nursing the wounded of the 1st South Carolina Colored Infantry Regiment, Taylor was the first Black woman to self-publish her memoirs. She was the author of Reminiscences of My Life in Camp with the 33rd United States Colored Troops, Late 1st S.C. Volunteers (1902). She was also an educator to formerly bonded Black people in the Reconstruction-era South when she opened various Freedmen's schools for them in and near the city of Savannah, Georgia. In her later years as a resident of Boston, Taylor became a main organizer of Corps 67 of the Massachusetts Woman's Relief Corps (1886).

== Biography ==
=== Childhood ===
Susie Taylor, born Susan Ann Baker on August 8, 1848, was the eldest of the nine children of Raymond and Hagar Ann Reed Baker. She was born into slavery on a plantation owned by Valentine Grest on the Isle of Wight in Liberty County, Georgia. Taylor is recognized as being a member of the Gullah peoples of the coastal lowlands of Georgia, South Carolina and Florida.

Susie Baker's grandmother Dolly Reed was allowed by Grest to take seven-year-old Susie to live with her in Savannah, then Georgia's largest city and a major seaport located some 38 miles (61 km) north of the plantation. Susie Baker moved to Reed's home there, along with her younger brother and sister. Reed sent her and her brother to be educated through what was known as an "underground education". Under Georgia state law in the 1850s, it was illegal for enslaved people to be educated. The girl and her brother were taught by a friend of Dolly Reed's, Mrs. Woodhouse, a free woman of color in Savannah who lived a half mile from Reed's house. Mrs. Woodhouse had the students enter one at a time with their books covered to keep from drawing much attention from the police or local whites. Susie Baker attended school with about 25 to 30 children for another two years, after which she would find instruction from another free woman of color, Mrs. Mathilda Beasley. Savannah's first Black nun, Beasley would continue to educate Susie until May 1860. Beasley then told Reed that she had taught the young girl all she knew and that Reed should find someone else to continue her studies.

Dolly Reed worked continuously to support the education of her granddaughter. Susie Baker became friends with a white playmate named Katie O’Connor, who attended a Savannah convent school. Her new friend agreed to continue to give Susie lessons if she promised not to tell anyone. After four months, the lessons ended when O’Connor formally entered the convent as a novice nun. Lastly, Susie would be educated by the son of Dolly Reed's white landlord until he was called to military duty for the Confederacy:

James Blouis, our landlord's son, was attending the High School, and was very fond of grandmother, so she asked him to give me a few lessons, which he did until the middle of 1861, when the Savannah Volunteer Guards, to which he and his brother belonged, were ordered to the front under General Barton. In the first battle of Manassas, his brother Eugene was killed, and James deserted over to the Union side, and at the close of the war went to Washington, D.C., where he has since resided. (Note: From Reminiscences of My Life in Camp (1902), p. 6.)

Susie King Taylor's early education would prove paramount. Her ability to read and write would later give her power and protection for people of color—both free people and slave. As a youngster, Susie Baker wrote town passes that gave some amount of security to Black people who were out on the street after the curfew bell was rung at nine o’clock each night. This helped keep the pass holders from being arrested by the watchman and placed in a guardhouse until their fines could be paid by their master or guardian. Despite being exposed to secessionist propaganda that attempted to paint all people from the North as wanting to further subjugate the Black population, young Susie Baker soon saw the importance of supporting the Union in the war. In 1862, she was given the opportunity to obtain her own freedom.

== American Civil War ==
=== Teacher ===
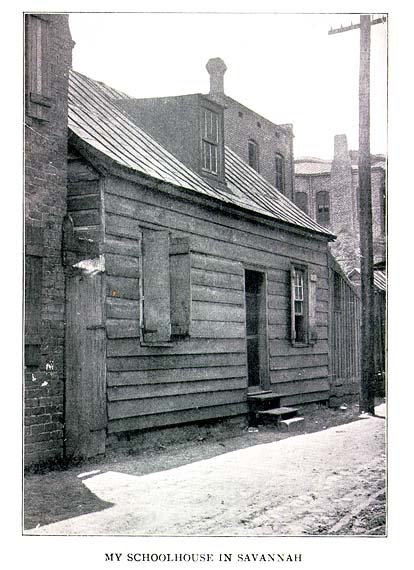
Susie King Taylor's school in Savannah, Georgia

One year into the Civil War, Susie Baker was sent back to the plantation and her mother's care on April 1, 1862. During the battle ten days later between the Confederate and Union armies at Fort Pulaski, Susie, along with her uncle and his family, fled to St. Catherine's Island to seek the protection of the Union fleet. After two weeks, the family members were transferred to St. Simon's Island. While aboard the Union gunboat during the transfer, Susie was questioned by its commander, Captain Whitmore, who inquired where she was from. Susie informed him that she was from Savannah. He then asked her if she could read and write. When he learned that she could, he handed her a notebook and asked her to write her name and where she was from. After being on St. Simon's Island for about three days, Commodore Goldsborough visited her at Gaston Bluff where they were located. It was at this meeting she was asked to take charge and create a school for the children on the island. She agreed to do so, provided she be given the necessary books for study. She received the books and testaments from the North and began her first school.

At the age of fourteen, Susie Baker founded the first free African-American school for children, and also became the first African-American woman to teach a free school in Georgia. During the day, Taylor educated more than forty children. Adults attended classes in her night school.

=== Formation of the 33rd Regiment Colored Troops ===
In late August 1862, Captain Charles T. Trowbridge came to St. Simon's Island by order of General David Hunter, a noted abolitionist. Under his orders all of the able men on the island were to be organized into his regiment. General Hunter was aware of the many skirmish events the men on the island had bravely fought and recruited them to join the 1st S. C. Volunteers, which would later be known as the 33rd U.S. Colored Troops. During October 1862, they received orders to evacuate the new troops to Beaufort, South Carolina. All of the enlisted men were housed at Camp Saxton, and Susie was enrolled with the army as a laundress. During this time she married Edward King, a non-commissioned officer in the Company E regiment. Captain Trowbridge was promoted to lieutenant-colonel in 1864 and remained with the 33rd Regiment until they mustered out on February 6, 1866.

In their spare time throughout their service to the regiment, both Susie King and her husband, Sergeant Edward King, continued to expand the education of many Black soldiers by teaching them how to read and write. Although Susie King's occupational title was laundress, while on Morris Island she spent little time doing these duties. Rather, she packed haversacks and cartridge packs for the soldiers to use in combat and carried out orders for the commanders. She is also believed to have been entrusted with rifled muskets by the regiment's officers and rumored to be a dead shot. She was even trusted to engage in active picket line duty, contributing more to the war than education and nursing services.

=== Nurse ===
In her memoir published in 1902, Susie King Taylor shared many of the gruesome sights she encountered during the war and expresses her willingness to help the wounded. She also describes her attempts to alleviate the soldiers' pain and personal hardship while they served their regiment. In a letter to Susie from Colonel C. T. Trowbridge, an officer of the 33rd regiment, he mentions that she is unable to acquire a federal pension, as she was an army nurse. He explains that she nonetheless is most deserving of a pension. Susie King willingly continued her service to the U.S. Colored Troops for four years and three months, and received no pay. In February 1862, she wrote about assisting a male nurse in the same military company during the war: Edward Davis had contracted varioloid, a form of smallpox that sometimes occurs when one is vaccinated against the disease. Susie, who had been previously vaccinated, would tend to David every day. He later died. During her time as a nurse, Susie met Clara Barton, later the founder of the American Red Cross. Taylor visited the hospital at Camp Shaw in Beaufort, South Carolina where Barton worked, and would help tend the wounded and sick.

== Reconstruction ==
After the American Civil War ended and the Reconstruction era began, Susie and her husband Edward King left the 33rd regiment and returned to Savannah. While Taylor opened a school for African-American children (whom she called the "children of freedom") and an adult night school on South Broad Street, Edward tried to find a job in his trade as a carpenter. However, strong prejudices against the newly freed African Americans prevented Edward from securing a job despite being a skilled carpenter. In September 1866, just months before the birth of his child with Susie, Edward King died in a docking accident while he worked as a longshoreman.

Although sources are a bit unclear as to how many schools Ms. Taylor eventually opened, they all state that she had to eventually close them all after charter schools for African Americans were established and she could no longer make a living through teaching. Susie placed her baby in her mother's care and took the only job available—as a domestic servant to Mr. and Mrs. Charles Green, a wealthy white family. In 1870, she traveled with the Greens to Boston for the summer, and while there, she won a prize for her excellent cooking at the fundraiser the ladies held to raise funds to build a new Episcopal church.

During the Reconstruction era, Taylor became a civil rights activist after witnessing much discrimination in the South, where Jim Crow and the Ku Klux Klan mocked and terrorized African Americans. In her book, Taylor mentions the constant lynching of Blacks and how southern laws were weaponized against anyone who was not white. Towards the end of her life, Taylor sought to provide aid to Afro-Cubans after the end of the Spanish American War in 1898. Taylor noticed that Afro-Cubans were being discriminated against in Cuba in similar ways to African Americans in the American South during Reconstruction. Her history as an educator also fueled her activism as she challenged the United Daughters of the Confederacy in their campaign to rid all mention of slavery from U.S. school history curriculums.

Taylor would travel once again to Boston in 1874 and entered into service for the Thomas Smith family in the Boston Highlands. After the death of Mrs. Smith, Taylor next served Mrs. Gorham Gray, of Beacon Street. Taylor remained with Mrs. Gray until her marriage to Russell L. Taylor in 1879.

=== Women’s Relief Corps ===
Susie King Taylor was part of the organizing of Corps 67 of the Women's Relief Corps in Boston in 1886. She held many positions, including guard, secretary, and treasurer. In 1893, she was elected president of Corps 67. In 1896, in response to an order to take a census of all of the Union Veterans now residing in Massachusetts, she helped create a complete roster for the veterans of the American Civil War to benefit many of her comrades. Susie King Taylor became a member of an all-Black corps in Boston, the Robert A. Bell Pt.

== Resting place ==
Taylor was buried in 1912 at Boston's Mount Hope Cemetery in the same plot as her husband, Russell L. Taylor (1854–1901). In 2019, a researcher discovered that Susie King Taylor's name had not been added to the headstone. In October 2021, Boston mayor Kim Janey dedicated a new memorial headstone inscribed with Ms. Taylor's name and likeness. It was paid for by the Massachusetts branch of the Sons of Union Veterans of the Civil War.

== Legacy ==
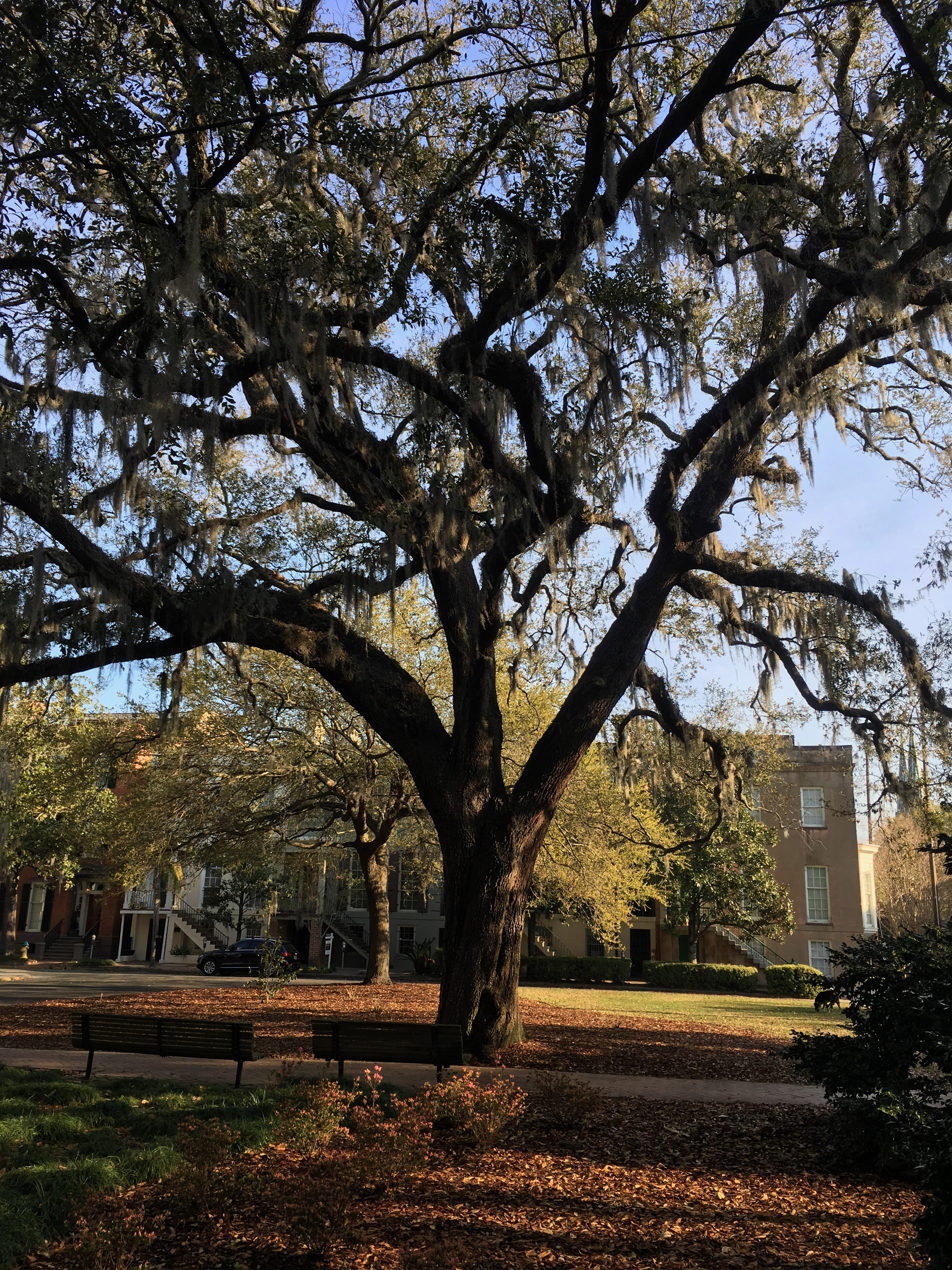
Taylor Square in Savannah.

Calhoun Square, located at Abercorn Street and East Wayne Street in Savannah, was renamed Taylor Square during a regular meeting of the Savannah City Council on August 24, 2023. The square had carried the name of John C. Calhoun, a pro-slavery former vice-president of the United States, since 1851.

In 2018, Taylor was elected posthumously to the Georgia Women of Achievement Hall of Fame (HOF) for her contributions to education, freedom, and humanity during her lifetime. Aside from being the first Black army nurse, Taylor was considered to be the first Black woman to teach in a school solely dedicated to educating former slaves. Between 1866 and 1868, she opened and taught in at least three schools in coastal Georgia.

In 2015, the Susie King Taylor Community School, a K–8 charter school that is part of the Savannah-Chatham County Public School System, was dedicated in Savannah's historic downtown. In Midway, a coastal Georgia city near Taylor's Isle of Wight birthplace and 32 miles south of Savannah, stands the first historic marker to honor Taylor. Erected in 2019 near the Midway First Presbyterian Church by the Georgia Historical Society, the official state marker commemorates Taylor's lifelong contributions to formal education, literature, and medicine.

The Susie King Taylor Women's Institute and Ecology Center was established in 2015 in Midway by historian Hermina Glass-Hill.

In Savannah, one of the four Savannah Belles ferry boats is named for Taylor.

== See also ==
- Julia O. Henson, a co-founder of the NAACP, lived next to Taylor in Boston. Henson donated her own house, which became the Harriet Tubman House for young unmarried African American women.
