= Savannah Historic District (Savannah, Georgia) =

Historic district in Georgia, United States

- U.S. National Register of Historic Places
- U.S. National Historic Landmark District
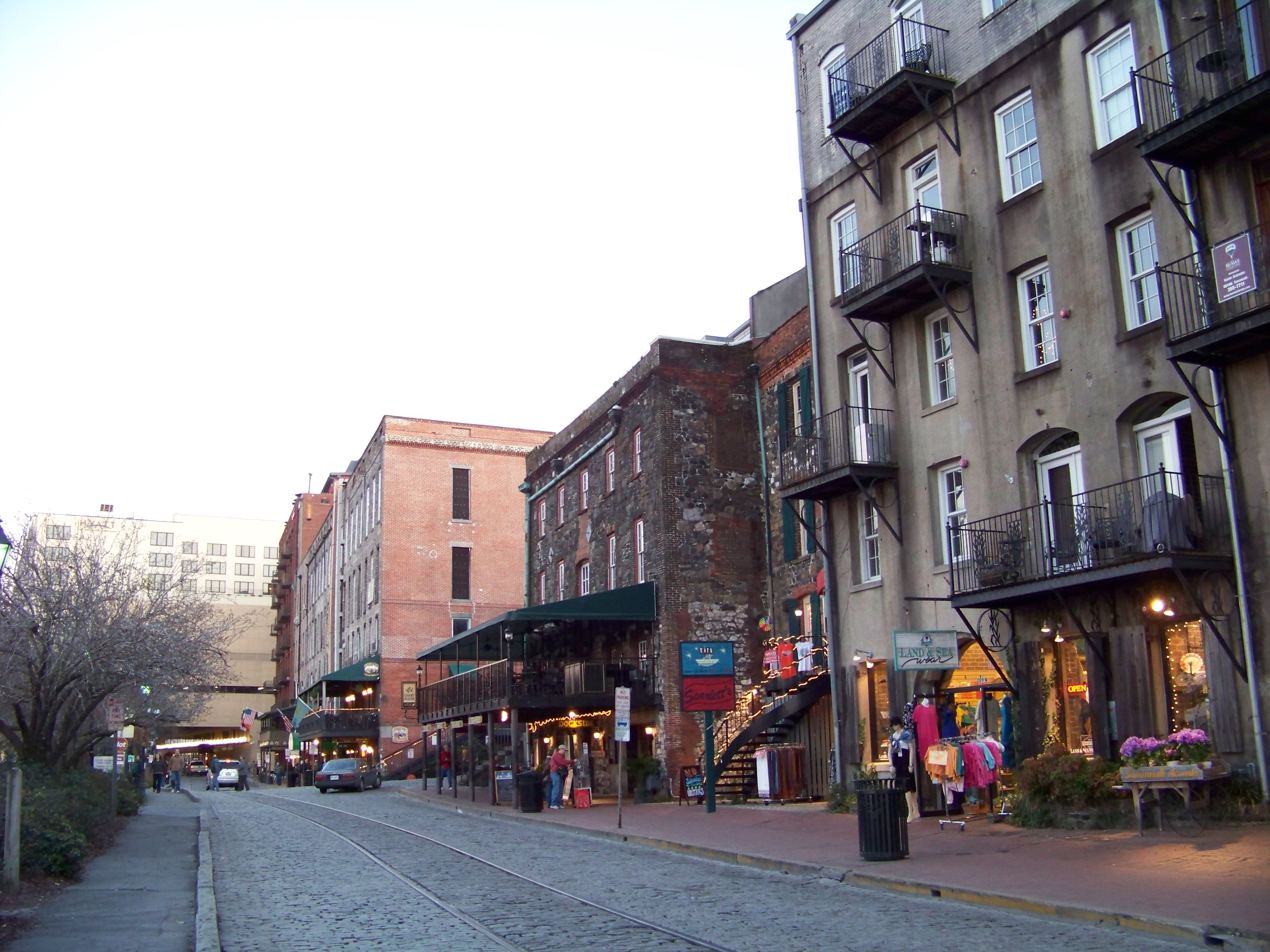
- River Street in the Savannah Historic District

- Location within Georgia Location within the United States
- Location: Bounded by E. Broad St., Gwinnett St., Martin Luther King Jr. Blvd. and the Savannah River, downtown Savannah, Georgia
- Coordinates: 32°4′28″N 81°5′30″W
- Area: ca. 1,300 acres (5.3 km^{2})
- Architect: Multiple
- Architectural style: mid-19th-century Revival and Federal
- NRHP reference No.: 66000277

Significant dates
- Added to NRHP: November 13, 1966 (59 years ago)
- Designated NHLD: November 13, 1966 (59 years ago)

The Savannah Historic District is a large urban U.S. historic district that roughly corresponds to the pre–Civil War city limits of Savannah, Georgia. The area was declared a National Historic Landmark District in 1966, and is one of the largest urban, community-wide historic preservation districts in the United States. The district was established in recognition of the Oglethorpe Plan, a unique model of urban planning begun in 1733 by James Oglethorpe at Savannah's founding and propagated during the first century of the city's growth.

The plan of the historic portions of Savannah is based on the concept of a ward, as defined by Oglethorpe. Each ward had a central square, around which were arrayed four trust lots and four tythings. Each trust lot was to be used for a civic purpose, such as a school, government building, church, museum, or other public venue, while the tythings were each subdivided into ten lots for residential use. The wards were oriented in a rectilinear grid with north–south and east–west alignments. In a typical ward, the trust lots were set east and west of the square, and the residential lots of the tythings were extended north and south of the trust lots and the square, each tything divided into two rows of five lots and separated by alleys. In the early years of the Province of Georgia, the ward organization was in part military, with each ward's inhabitants organized into militia units, and the central squares acting as a gathering point for refugees from outside the city walls.

Each year, the Savannah Historic District attracts millions of visitors, who enjoy its eighteenth- and nineteenth-century architecture and green spaces. The district includes the Juliette Gordon Low Birthplace—the birthplace of Juliette Gordon Low, founder of the Girl Scouts of the United States of America—which is also part of the Juliette Gordon Low Historic District. It also includes the Telfair Academy of Arts and Sciences (one of the South's first public museums), the First African Baptist Church (the oldest African American Baptist congregation in the United States), Temple Mickve Israel (the third-oldest synagogue in America), the Central of Georgia Railway roundhouse complex (the oldest standing antebellum rail facility in America), Christ Church (the Mother Church of Georgia), the old Colonial Cemetery, Cathedral of St. John the Baptist, Old Harbor Light, and Factors Row, a line of former cotton warehouses, along its waterfront, some built from ships' ballast stones.

Other buildings in the district include the Isaiah Davenport House, the Green-Meldrim House, the Owens–Thomas House, the William Scarbrough House, the Sorrel–Weed House, and the United States Customhouse. Notable green spaces in the district include Savannah's 22 squares, the 30-acre Forsyth Park (at the southern limit of the district), and Emmet Park, part of The Strand, near the city's riverfront, in what was known as the Old Fort neighborhood.

== See also ==
- Buildings in Savannah Historic District
- List of National Historic Landmarks in Georgia
- National Register of Historic Places listings in Chatham County, Georgia
