= Hutchinson Island (Georgia) =

Coordinates: 32°05′54″N 81°06′10″W

Hutchinson Island, Georgia
- Interactive map of Hutchinson Island, Georgia
- Country: United States
- State: Georgia
- County: Chatham County

Hutchinson Island is a developed island in the Savannah River, located in the U.S. state of Georgia. It lies north of, and directly across the river from, downtown Savannah. The island is formed where the Back River breaks off to the north from the Savannah River. Historically, Hutchinson Island's land use was primarily industrial, much of which supported the Port of Savannah, one of the busiest containerization cargo ports in the world. It also serves as a natural barrier between Savannah and nearby South Carolina. The island is roughly 7 miles (11 km) long and 1 mile (1.6 km) wide at its widest point.

== History ==
Hutchinson Island is named for Archibald Hutchinson, an acquaintance of Gen. James Edward Oglethorpe, Savannah's founder.

In December 1864, the island played a major role in the Union's capture of Savannah, a leading Southern seaport during the American Civil War. After taking the rail center of Atlanta, Union Gen. William Tecumseh Sherman turned his vast army east and south toward the Atlantic Ocean. Rather than destroying Savannah, Sherman elected to demand the city's surrender. Under cover of darkness, Confederate Gen. William J. Hardee fled with his troops across the Savannah River on a makeshift pontoon bridge spanning Hutchinson Island, and into the South Carolina wilderness.

By the 20th century, the U.S. Army Corps of Engineers maintained a tidal control system on the Back River that slowed the natural filling of the main river's shipping channel. The tide gate was abandoned after studies showed that it had increased saltwater intrusion into the freshwater Savannah National Wildlife Refuge, located approximately 10 miles (16 km) upriver from the city.

== Facilities ==
The Westin Savannah

Totaling approximately 2,000 acres (8.1 km^{2}), Hutchinson Island was targeted as the site for a public-private partnership to build a convention center and hotel adjacent to downtown Savannah. Chatham County voters approved spending $63 million in public special-purpose local-option sales tax money for the trade center and $10 million for the road system on the island. The Savannah International Trade and Convention Center and the Westin Savannah Harbor Resort were built. In addition, the state of Georgia provided $18 million, and former landowner CSX Railroad donated 25 acres (100,000 m^{2}) for the public trade center.

While much of Hutchinson Island has been oriented toward trade conventions and resorts, construction of the island's first residential community is underway. To be called the Reserve at Savannah Harbor, the community's plans envision developing its riverfront into a mixed-use, urban extension of downtown Savannah on the Hutchinson side.

The Georgia Ports Authority and International Paper still own undeveloped tracts of land on the far west end of Hutchinson Island.

=== Grand Prize of America Road Course ===
Track map of the circuit

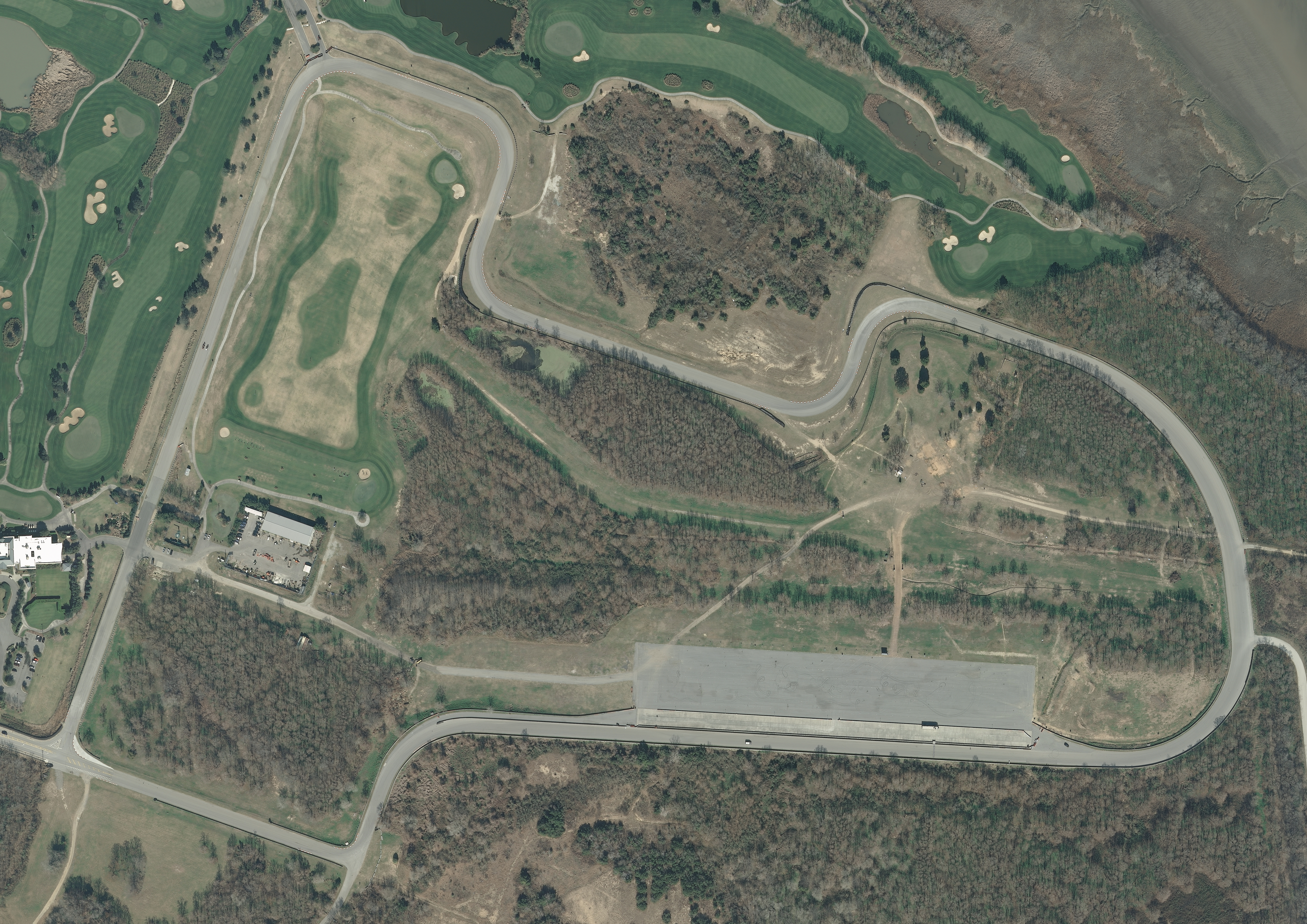
Aerial photo of the track in 2012

In the 1990s, a group of local businessmen formed the Colonial Motorsport company, deciding it was time to bring back international racing action to Savannah. Major international races had last been held on the streets of Savannah with the American Grand Prize in 1908, 1910, and 1911; and the Vanderbilt Cup Race in 1911. After four years of careful negotiations, an agreement was reached for a stand-alone race of the then PPG/Firestone Indy Lights series in 1997, with follow up events in '98 and '99 offering the possibility of a future CART round. Public monies helped build a 1.965-mile county road to serve as a 10-turn circuit; the first time a public road had been pre-designed with the intention of also using it for racing in the USA. In May 1997 the inaugural Dixie Crystals Grand Prix was held, with support races for the North American Touring Car Championship, Barber Dodge Pro Series, and the U.S. F2000 National Championship. Before of a race day crowd of over 30,000, future Indianapolis 500 winner, Hélio Castroneves, won the race.

Mark Blundell quoted, after a feasibility test for future CART races, "As a drivers track, it's good, It's quite demanding and really physical. It's a fun circuit to drive, and there are at least two and possibly three spots for overtaking. It doesn't have a street course feel, it's more of a road course feel. From a spectator viewpoint, there are plenty of great vantage points."

The event looked like a modest success; drivers seemed happy with the course, fans turned out in reasonable numbers, and a contract was in place for future years. However, creditors and several companies involved in the construction didn't want to give the promoters a reasonable time frame to make the event profitable. The resulting lawsuit threw Colonial Motorsport company into Chapter 11, and all its contracts, including the one with CART, were dissolved. The track itself came into public ownership and fell into disrepair.

In the 2010s the track was reworked and reopened for historic racing. As of 2014 Historic Sportscar Racing (HSR) has been sanctioning the Savannah Speed Classic, part of the Hilton Head Island Motoring Festival & Concours d'Elegance, taking place the last weekend of October (in Savannah) through the first weekend in November (in Hilton Head Island) each year.

In July 2021, the organizers of the Savannah Speed Classic, Hilton Head Island Concours d’Elegance, cancelled the 2021 event. With construction work encroaching on the south west portion of Grand Prize of America Ave (the track's turn 8) forcing the guardrail to be removed, organizers had significant concerns about the ability to provide a safe venue for competitors, spectators, volunteers and on-site management. There are currently no plans to bring the Savannah Speed Classic back.

== Access ==
The Savannah Belles Ferry transports visitors and residents across the Savannah River from downtown Savannah to Hutchinson on a regular daily schedule. The island can also be accessed by car from the south, via the Talmadge Memorial Bridge, and from the north, in South Carolina, via U.S. Highway 17.

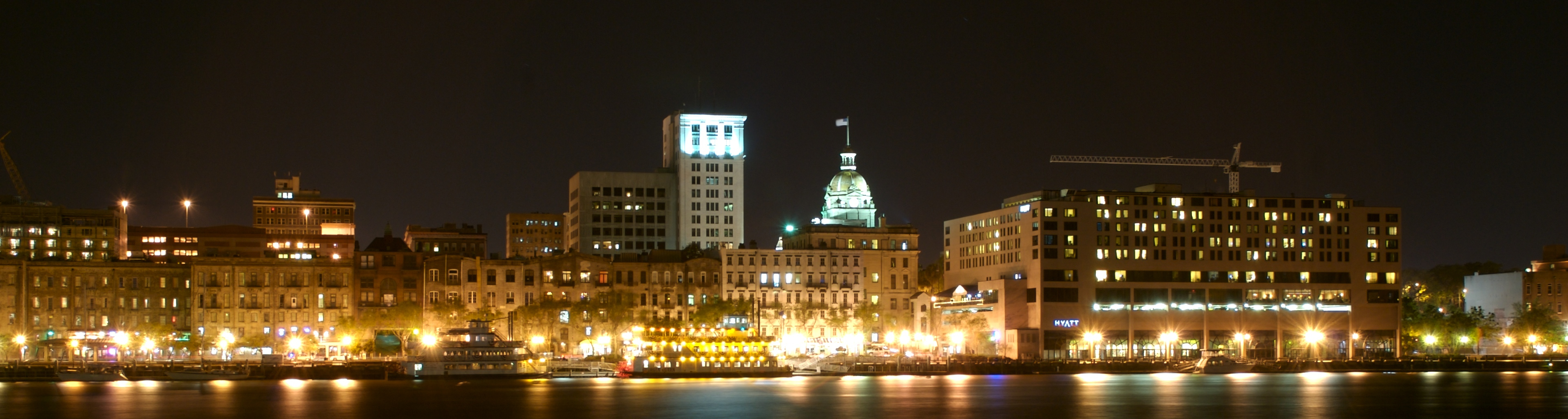
Panorama of Savannah's River Street district from Hutchinson Island
