= Florence Martus =

American ship greeter

- Martus around 1940
- Born: Florence Margaret Martus; August 7, 1868; Cockspur Island, Georgia, U.S.
- Died: February 8, 1943 (aged 74); Savannah, Georgia, U.S.
- Resting place: Laurel Grove North Cemetery, Savannah
- Known for: Waving

Historical marker

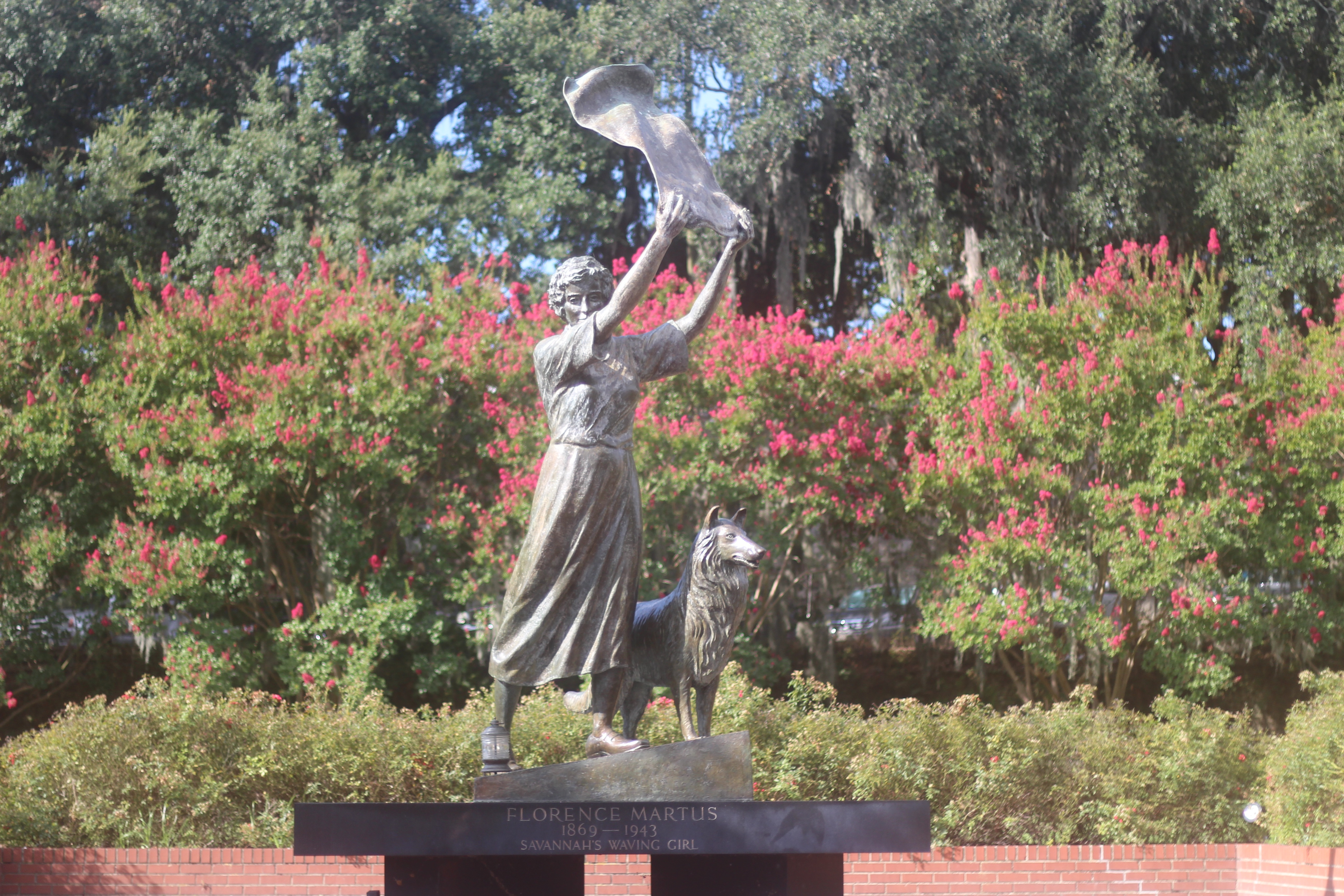
Savannah's Waving Girl statue, inscribed with Martus' incorrect year of birth

Florence Margaret Martus (August 7, 1868 – February 8, 1943), also known as "the Waving Girl", took it upon herself to be the unofficial greeter of all ships entering and leaving the Port of Savannah, Georgia, via the Savannah River, between 1887 and 1931. A few years after she began waving at passing sailors, she moved in with her brother, a light keeper, at his small white cottage about five miles upriver from Fort Pulaski. From her rustic home on Elba Island, a tiny piece of land in the Savannah River near the Atlantic Ocean, Martus waved a handkerchief by day and a lantern by night. According to legend, not a ship was missed in her forty-four years on watch. A statue of Martus by the sculptor Felix de Weldon was erected in Morrell Park on Savannah's historic riverfront in 1972.

== Early life ==
Martus was born on August 7, 1868, in Cockspur Island, near Savannah, Georgia. She was the daughter of German-born Civil War veteran John H. Martus and Rosanna Cecilia Decker. She had five siblings: Catherine, Annie, Charles, George and Mary. John Martus was an ordnance sergeant at Fort Pulaski on Cockspur Island.

Following her father's death (by 1890), the family moved to Savannah. They returned to Elba Island when her brother, George, became keeper of the Elba and South Channel lights.

== Legends ==
Many legends endure about Martus, notably the following:

- The reason she greeted ships was because as a young girl, she had fallen in love with a sailor and wanted to be sure he would find her when he returned. When, after 44 years, he did not, she died of a broken heart.
- Sailors would bring her gifts.
- When the captain of the ship that brought her memorial statue to Savannah arrived, he refused to accept payment because of his fond memories of Martus.

== Personal life ==
When George retired, they both moved to Bona Bella in Savannah, with the mayor of Savannah officially welcoming them to the city.

=== Death ===
Martus died on February 8, 1943, aged 74. After a service at the Cathedral of St. John the Baptist, she was buried in a family plot at Laurel Grove North Cemetery.

== Legacy ==
On September 27, 1943, Liberty ship SS Florence Martus was named in her honor.

In 1999, the city of Savannah named its ferry service, the Savannah Belles Ferry, after four of Savannah's notable women, including Florence Martus.

The Waving Girl historical marker was officially dedicated in 1958 and is located near the visitor center at Fort Pulaski.
