= John Foley (major) =

Irish-born soldier and merchant

- Foley, pictured around 1870
- Born: 1813; Ballinclare, County Kerry, Ireland
- Died: 14 September 1881 (aged 67–68); Savannah, Georgia, U.S.

Major John Foley (1813 – 14 September 1881) was a 19th-century Irish merchant and Army major who came to prominence after emigrating to the United States.

== Life and career ==
Foley was born in Ballinclare, County Kerry, Ireland, in 1813. He married young, but his wife died prior to his emigration to the United States in August 1836. His brother, Patrick, was an Episcopal minister in County Tipperary.

Foley arrived in New York City on 22 September 1836, and in Savannah, Georgia, on 31 October. He took the Oath of Allegiance on 16 May 1838.

Living and working in Columbia Square, he was involved with the Central of Georgia Railway during its construction.

On New Year's Eve 1840, he was fined $30 for operating his business on a Sunday, thus violating the Sabbath ordinance. This happened on several occasions.

In 1851, Foley became a mason, joining Solomon's Lodge No. 1 and rising through the ranks to Junior Warden by the 1860s.

Foley regularly travelled to New York City to procure goods for his clothing and linen-goods business, often leaving his store in the hands of friends (such as John Riordan) while he was away. His store was on the first floor of The Marshall House on Broughton Street, and he later lived above the store.

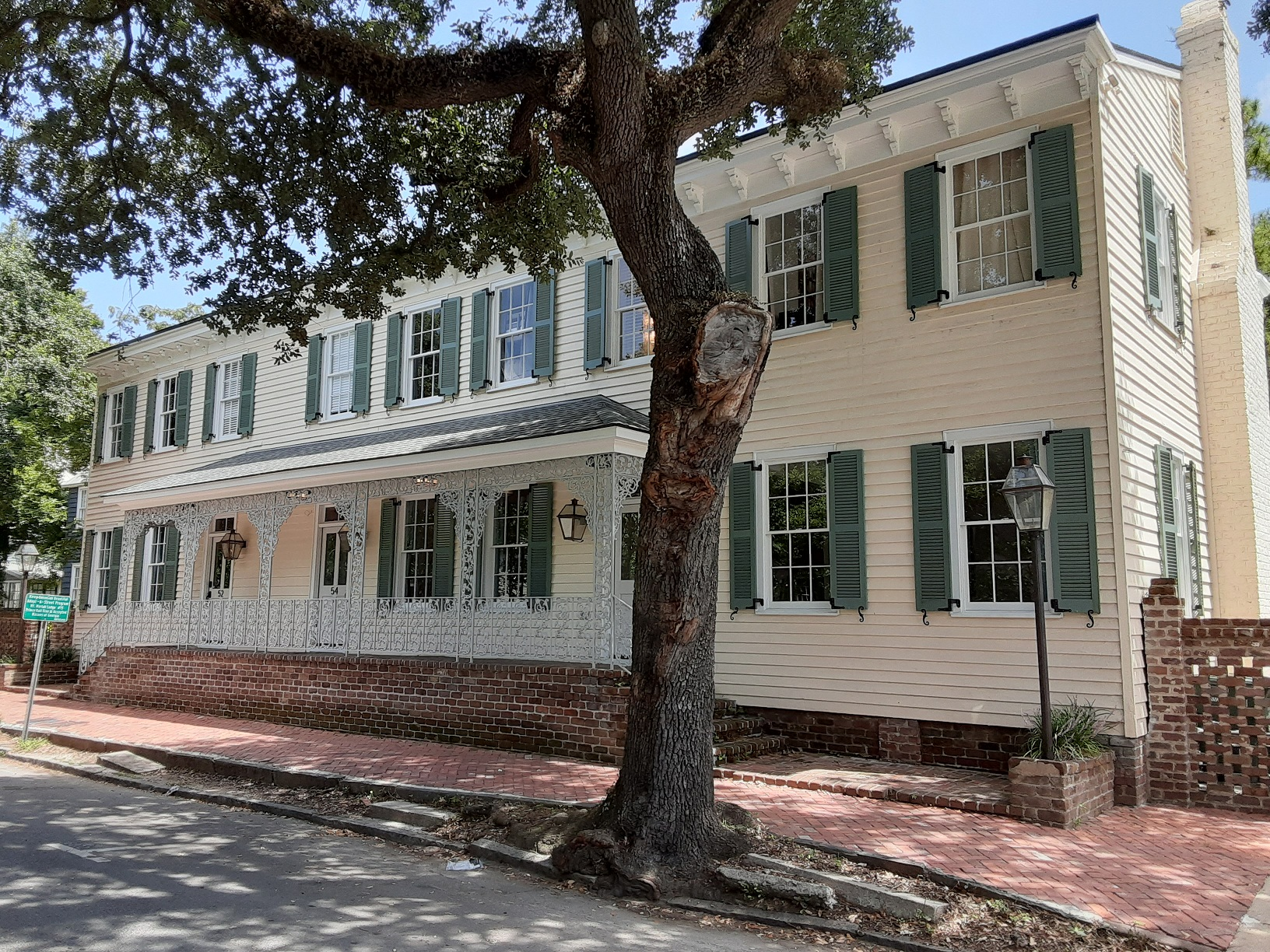
John Foley Duplex, 52–56 East Broad Street, built in 1874

On 18 April 1859, he was elected captain of the Irish Jasper Greens, and served during the Mexican–American War. In the Civil War, he was listed as captain of Company A, First Regiment of Georgia Volunteer Infantry Army of an earlier version of the Tennessee State Guard, in the Roster of the Confederate soldiers of Georgia 1861–1865 via the pages of the 14 September 1861 edition of Savannah's Daily Morning News. He was promoted to major by the following January. He was subsequently offered the role of lieutenant colonel but declined it.

After the war, Foley resumed his merchant trade with a liquor store at 199 Bay Street, near the Savannah waterfront.

In 1866, Foley purchased today's 425 East York Street from John Haupt.

By 1870, Foley was living at 37 York Street (today's 417 East York Street). Three years later, he was elected president of an earlier version of the Atlantic Coast Line Railroad.

In 1874, he purchased from Thomas R. Mills lot number 20 in Savannah's Trustees' Garden Ward and had built the property at today's 52–56 East Broad Street. By February, he had erected "three fine wooden dwellings".

He entered semi-retirement in 1879, becoming a collector of rents.

== Death ==
In the early 1880s, Foley's health began to decline. His nephew, Dr Thomas McCoaith Foley, was a surgeon on the Monarch Line of merchant steamships. Upon learning of his uncle's situation, he arrived on 4 September 1881 from New York City to visit his bedside. After briefly leaving to check in to a room at The Marshall House and to have dinner, his uncle's nurse, Henrietta Cooper, tracked him down to inform him that his uncle had died at 2:45 PM, aged 67 or 68. Thomas remained to witness the signing over of his uncle's properties. For being a faithful servant, Foley had promised Henrietta two houses and lots. They were both in the western half of lot number 11 in Greene Ward, facing State Street and Broughton Street. The remaining properties were sold at public auction in March and April 1882.

His funeral was held the following day at his 37 York Street home, officiated by Reverend Thomas Boon, rector of Savannah's Christ Church. A three-gun salute was performed over his grave at Laurel Grove Cemetery.

Foley's Columbia Square property, which housed his business between 1840 and 1860, was sold to Sigmund Elsinger in 1882.
