= Herb House =

Building in Savannah, Georgia, US

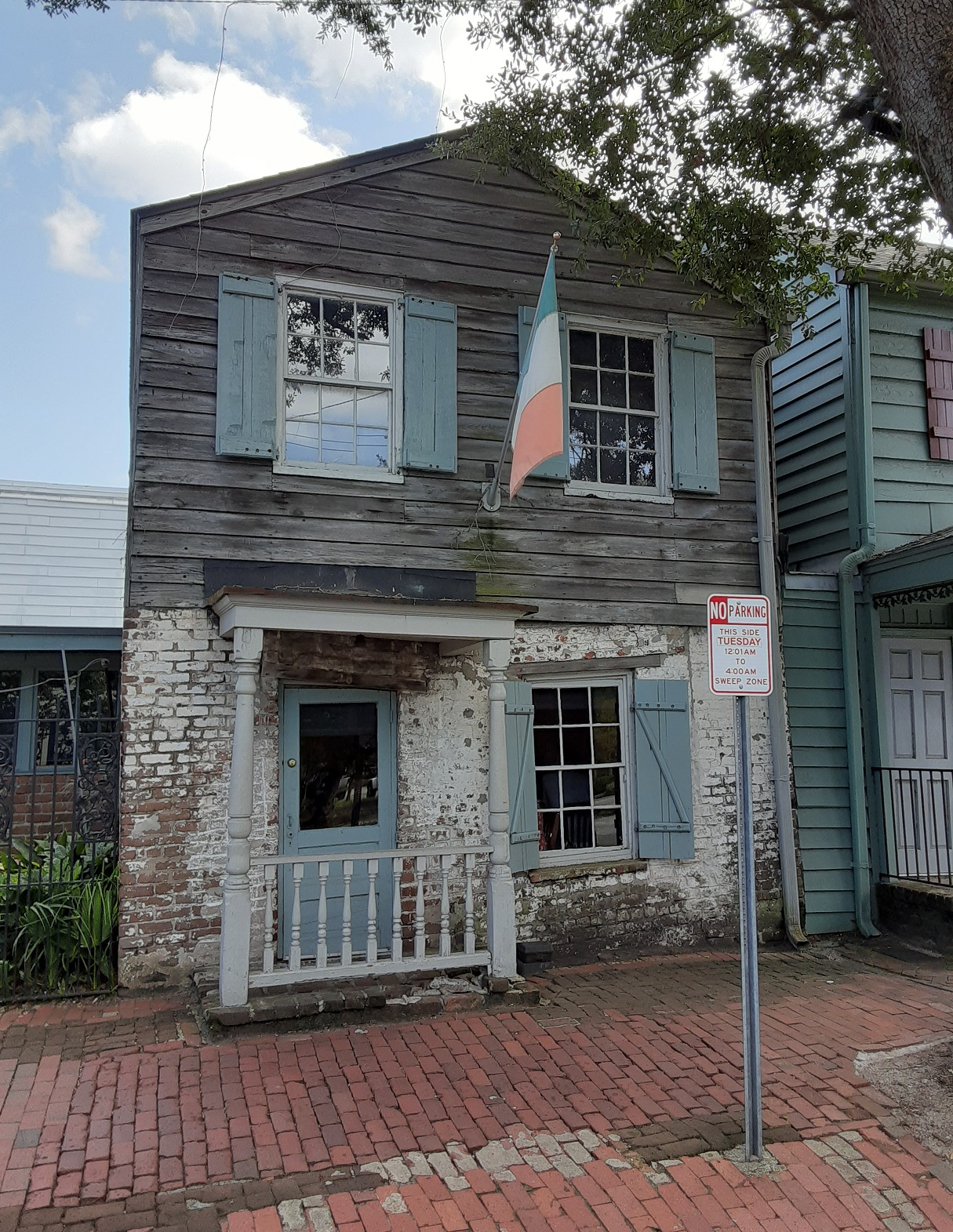
- The building in 2021
- Interactive map of the Herb House area

General information
- Location: Savannah, Georgia, U.S., 26 East Broad Street
- Coordinates: 32°04′42″N 81°05′02″W
- Completed: 1853 (173 years ago)
- Owner: The Savannah Gas Company

Technical details
- Floor count: 2

The Herb House is a historic building in downtown Savannah, Georgia, United States. It was constructed, in local handmade brick, in 1853 (at least, that is the year it first appears on a map). Erroneous sources have stated the building was constructed in the 1730s, which would have made it the oldest extant building in the state of Georgia. The building is now part of the restaurant Pirates' House, the buildings for which both pre- (1794) and post-date (1871) it.

== History ==
The Herb House was built on a ten-acre plot of land located on the east side of James Oglethorpe's original plan of the city of Savannah. The plot was assigned to become a botanical garden that modeled the Chelsea Botanical Garden in London, England. The garden, which was located beyond the bounds of today's buildings, was dedicated to Oglethorpe's trustees, becoming known as the Trustees' Garden.

The building was constructed on the plot of land around 1853 to house the gardener who worked there. This building was deemed the Herb House. A hay loft, where the gardener slept, was on the second floor of the building. The front of the first floor was used for tools and gardening supplies, while the rear was stables.

== Renovation and ownership ==
In 1948, Pirates' House and the surrounding land was acquired by The Savannah Gas Company. The building soon caught the interest of Mary Hillyer, wife Hansell Hillyer, the president of the company. She renewed the house museum into the restaurant of the present day.
