= Trustees' Garden =

Historic garden site in Savannah

- Interactive map of Trustees' Garden
- Type: Garden
- Location: Savannah, Georgia, U.S.
- Coordinates: 32.0771°N 81.0833°W
- Area: 10 acres (4.0 ha)

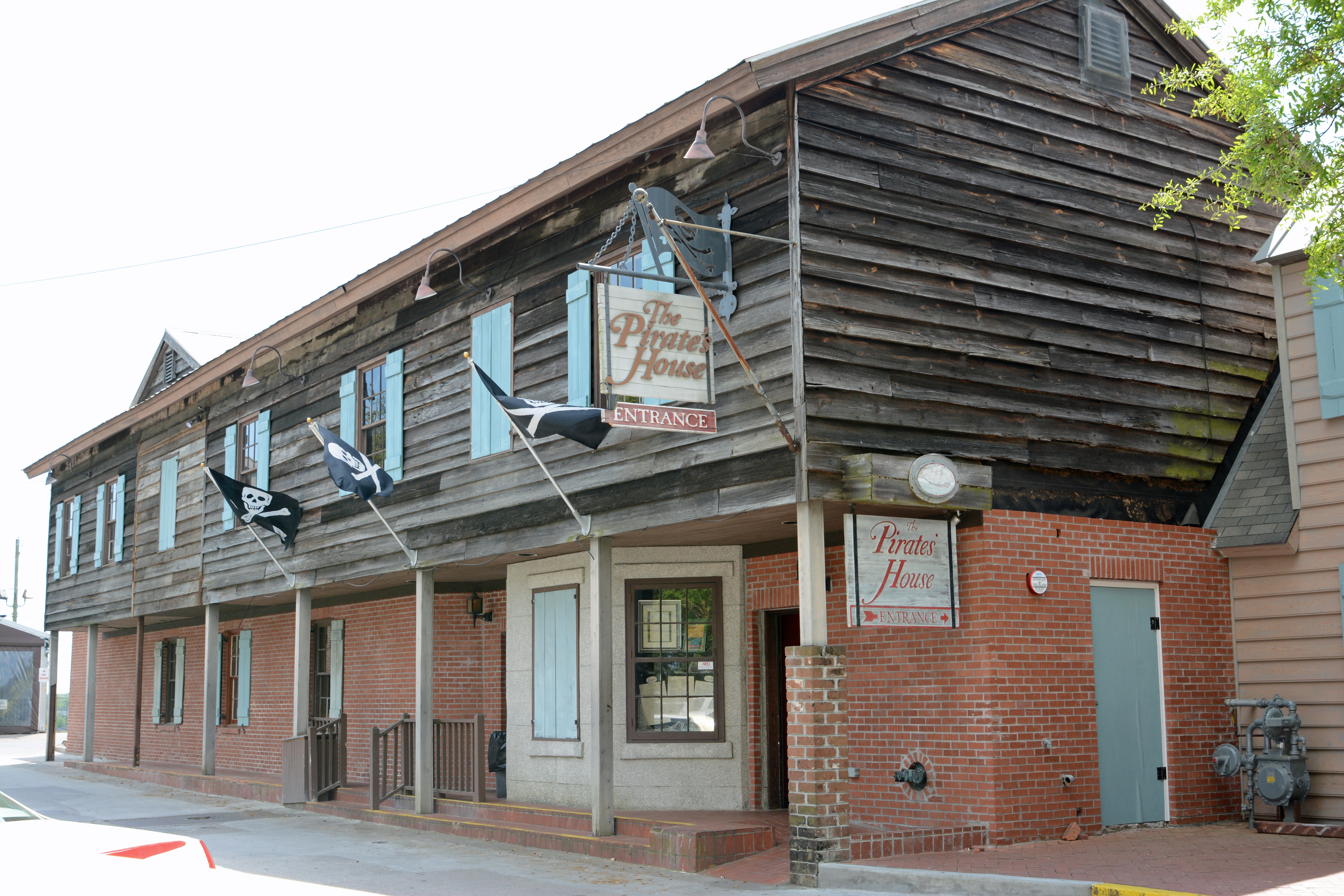
Pirates' House, which stands on part of the land of the Trustees' Garden

Trustees' Garden was an area of Savannah, Trustee Georgia, established by General James Oglethorpe shortly after his 1733 arrival in the city. It was dedicated to Oglethorpe's trustees (officially the Trustees for the Establishment of the Colony of Georgia in America). It was located to the east of Oglethorpe's original plan of Savannah, on land, near the bluff overlooking the Savannah River, and now partly occupied by Pirates' House (1794) and Herb House (1853), both on East Broad Street. It is now part of the Savannah Historic District.

The garden was assigned to become a botanical garden which modeled the Chelsea Botanical Garden in London. Oglethorpe recruited botanists from around the world to acquire plants for the project, such as cotton, spices, indigo and medicinal herbs. The garden was hoped to bring success in the wine and silk industries and was centered on growing mulberry trees. The soil and weather conditions of Georgia were not compatible with the mulberry trees and it was not successful with wine or silk; however, it did distribute peach trees, for which Georgia is now renowned. The garden was also highly successful in growing cotton, which later became a staple of Georgia's economy.

The garden had fallen into disuse by the late 1730s, well before Oglethorpe's final departure from Savannah. In 1748, Georgia's royal governor John Reynolds was granted the land, on which he built some residences.

A building was built on the plot of land in 1853 to house the gardener who worked there. This building was deemed the Herb House. A hay loft, where the gardener slept, was on the second floor of the building. The first floor was used for tools and gardening supplies.

Phoenix Iron Works (also known as Kehoe Iron Works) was built on the land in 1873.

The garden was restored in the mid-20th century. Dolores B. Floyd, wife of Marmaduke Floyd, became the spearhead of the project, during which all of the buildings on the site were scheduled for demolition. Hansell Hillyer acquired the Savannah Gas Company in 1945, and he and his wife, Mary, assisted in the preservation of the properties. Savannah Gas Company had previously purchased a tract of land adjoining Kehoe's iron works in 1923. At the time, Savannah Gas Company was located at the corner of East Bay Street and Randolph Street. This corner of the city was later altered when General McIntosh Boulevard was built, connecting East Bay Street to East President Street.

An event facility, Kehoe Iron Works at Trustees' Garden, now operates on part of the land.
