= York Street (Savannah, Georgia) =

Prominent street in Savannah, Georgia

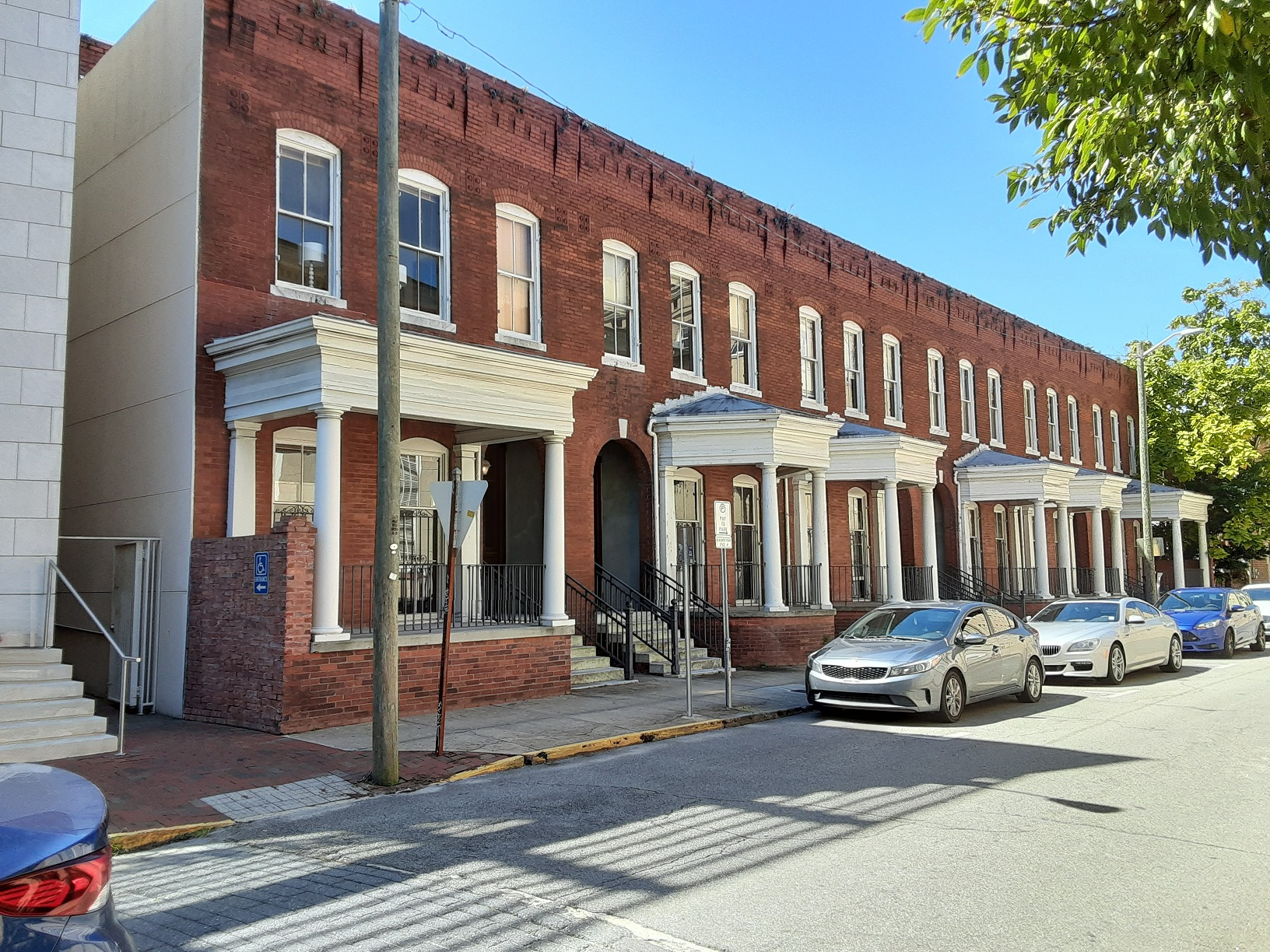
- Walker Row House, West York Street
- Namesake: Duke of York
- Length: 0.70 mi (1.13 km)
- Location: Savannah, Georgia, U.S.
- West end: Montgomery Street
- East end: East Broad Street

York Street is a prominent street in Savannah, Georgia, United States. Located, in its downtown section, between State Street to the north and Oglethorpe Avenue to the south, it runs for about 0.70 miles (1.13 km) from Montgomery Street in the west to East Broad Street in the east. It is named for the Duke of York. The street is entirely within Savannah Historic District, a National Historic Landmark District.

York Street passes through five squares on their southern side. From west to east:

- Telfair Square
- Wright Square
- Oglethorpe Square
- Columbia Square
- Greene Square

== Notable buildings and structures ==
Below is a selection of notable buildings and structures on York Street, all in Savannah's Historic District. From west to east:

West York Street

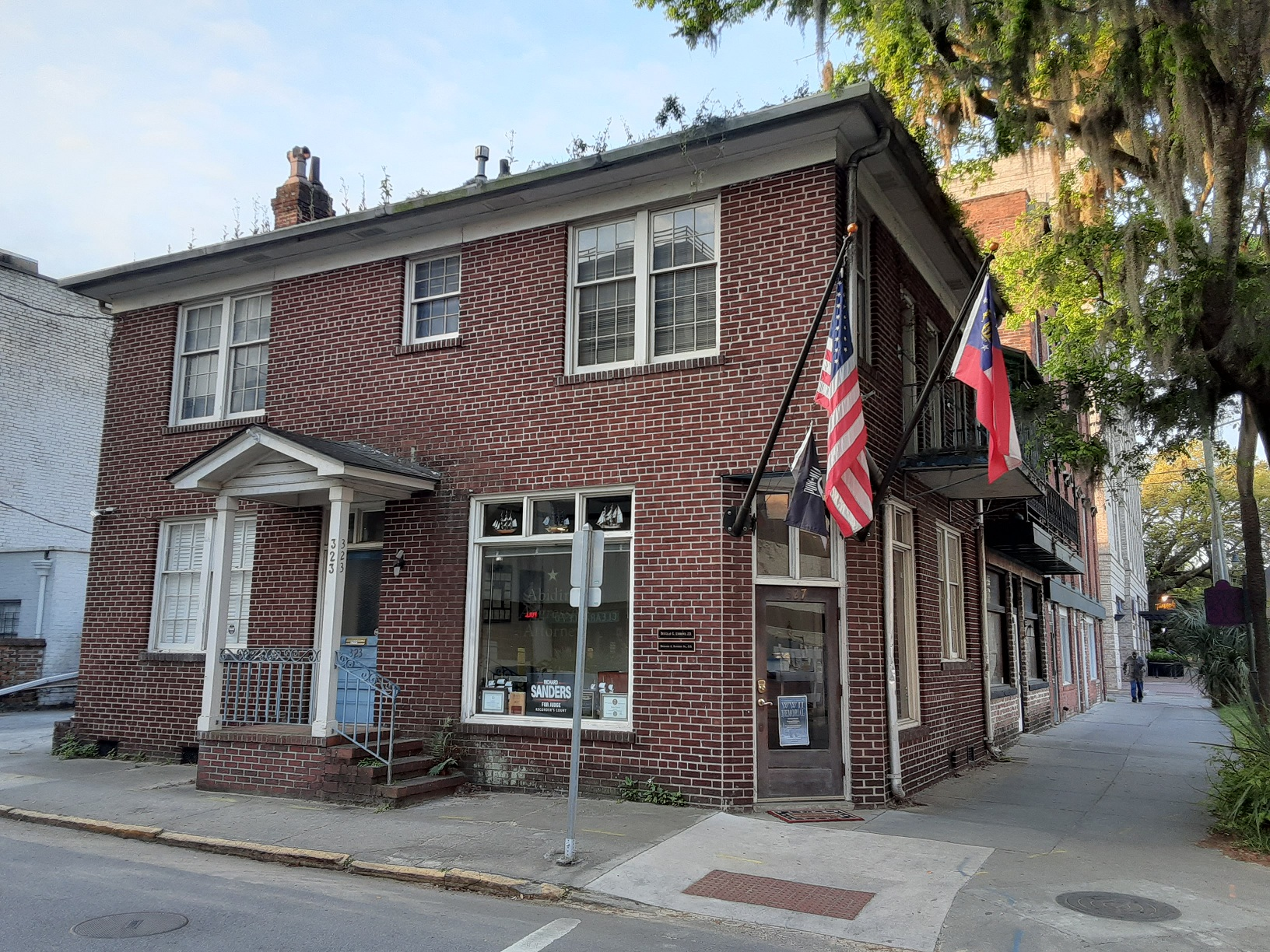
323 West York Street, completed in 1900

- 323 West York Street (1900)
- Frederick Selleck Property (I), 311 West York Street (1822)
- Frederick Selleck Property (II), 305 West York Street (1822)
- Robert Walker Row House, 213–223 West York Street (1905)
- Thomas Henderson Building, 15–21 West York Street (1890)
- Lindsay & Morgan Building, 5–11 West York Street (1921)

East York Street

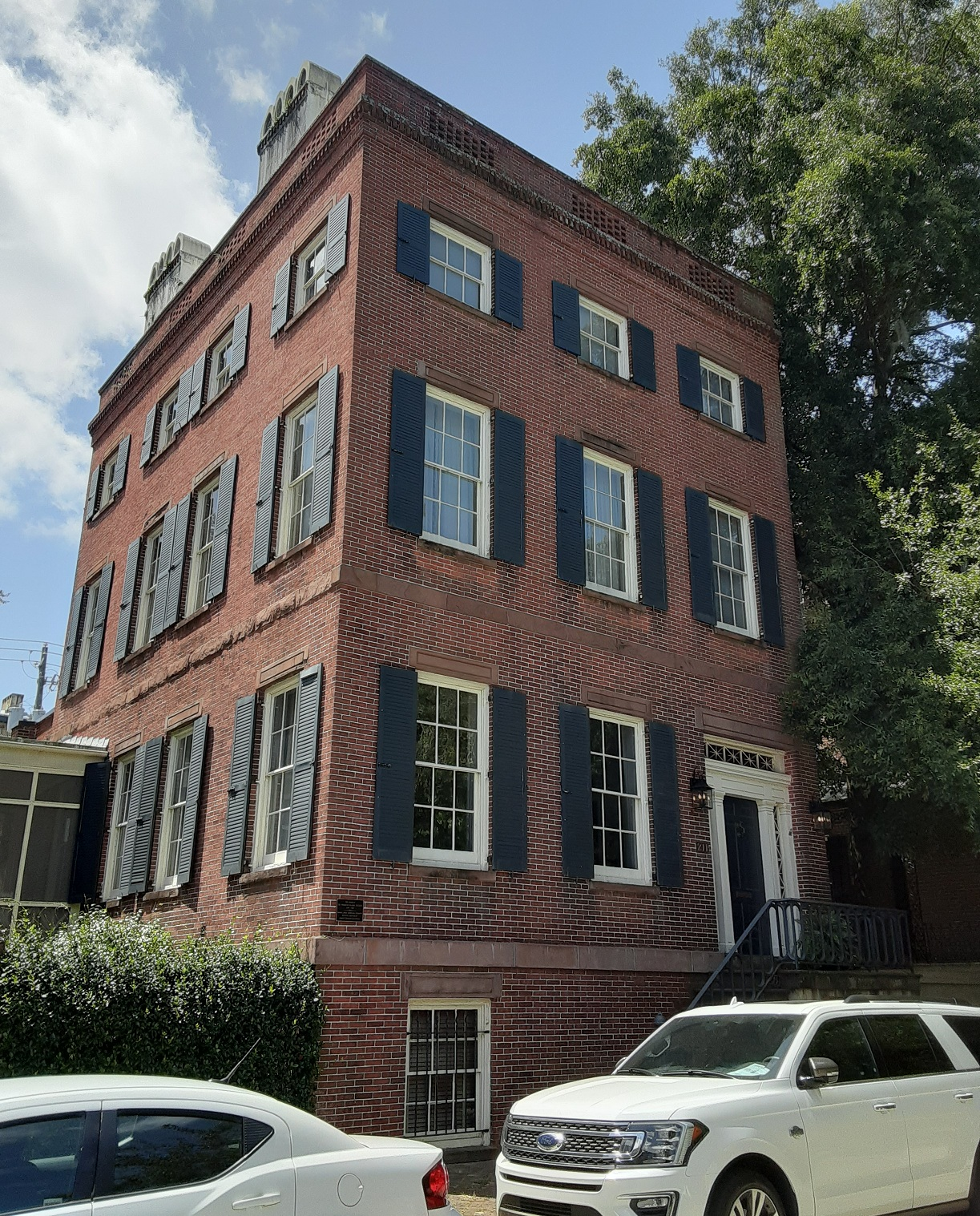
Jane Young House, 211 East York Street

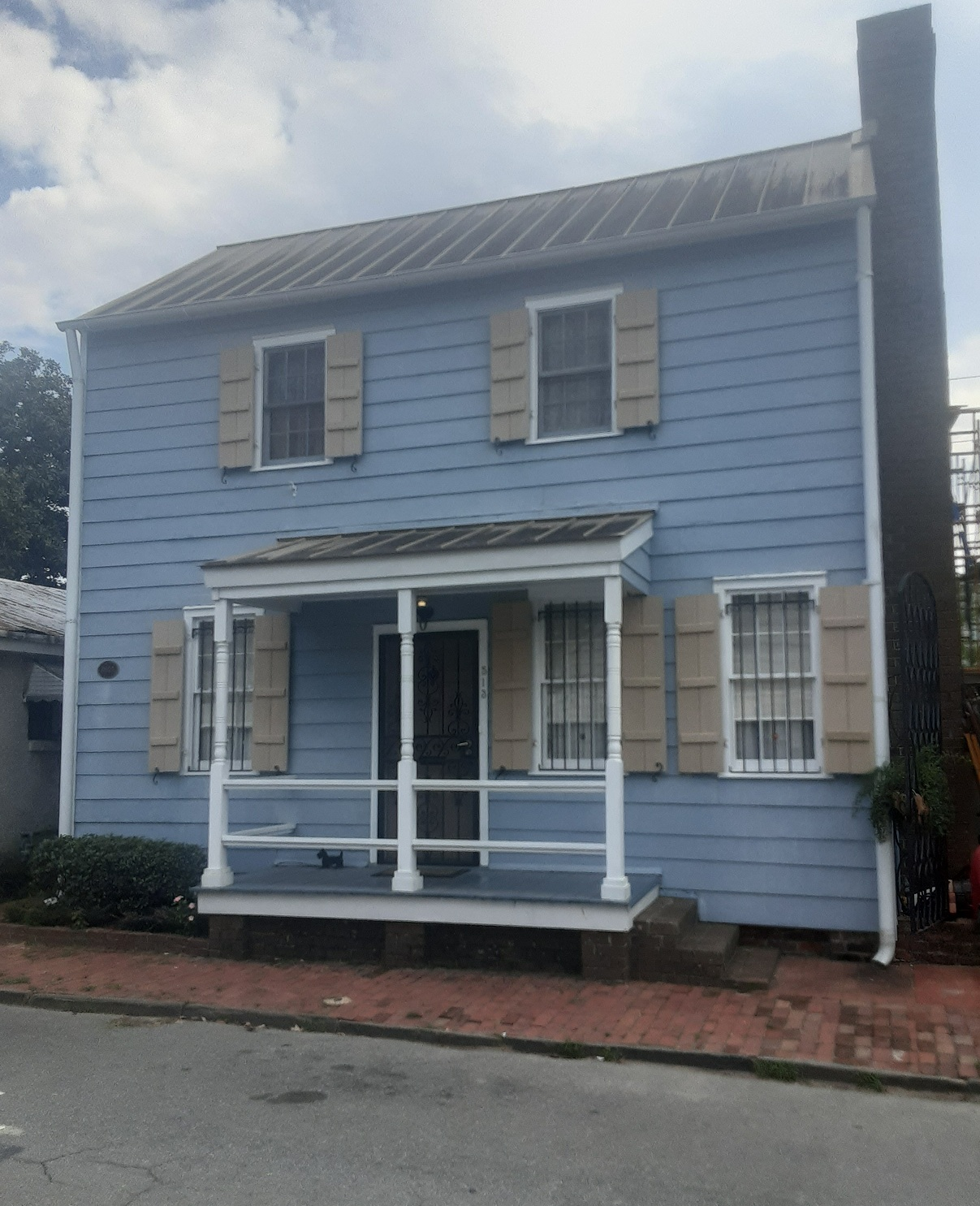
Catherine Deveaux House, 513 East York Street

- Peter Ott Property, 15–19 East York Street (1892)
- Esther Stewart Property, 21–25 East York Street (1853–1856)
- Marine Hospital, 115 East York Street (1907; now part of Savannah College of Art and Design)
- Henry Dickerson Duplex, 201–203 East York Street (1853)
- James Mills House, 205 East York Street (1855)
- Jane Young House, 211 East York Street (1853)
- John Feely Duplex, 217–219 East York Street (1872) – built for John Foley
- Charles Landershine House, 221 East York Street (1856)
- Jerome H. Wilson House, 307–311 East York Street (1872)
- Thomas Morgan House, 313–315 East York Street (1885)
- Abraham Sheftall House, 321 East York Street (1818; moved from Elbert Ward in 1966)
- 409 East York Street (1880)
- Deitrich Oetjen House, 503 East York Street (1897)
- William Herman Duplex, 506–508 East York Street (1902)
- Frederick Heineman Property, 509 East York Street (circa 1839)
- George Jones House, 510 East York Street (1799)
- Teresa Neve House, 511 East York Street (1855)
- Catherine Deveaux House, 513 East York Street (1853)
- Susannah Clarke Cottage, 517 East York Street (circa 1805)
- Edward White Cottage, 519 East York Street (circa 1812)
- Margaret McDonald House, 521 East York Street (1883)
