= Susannah Clarke Cottage =

Historic building in Savannah, Georgia

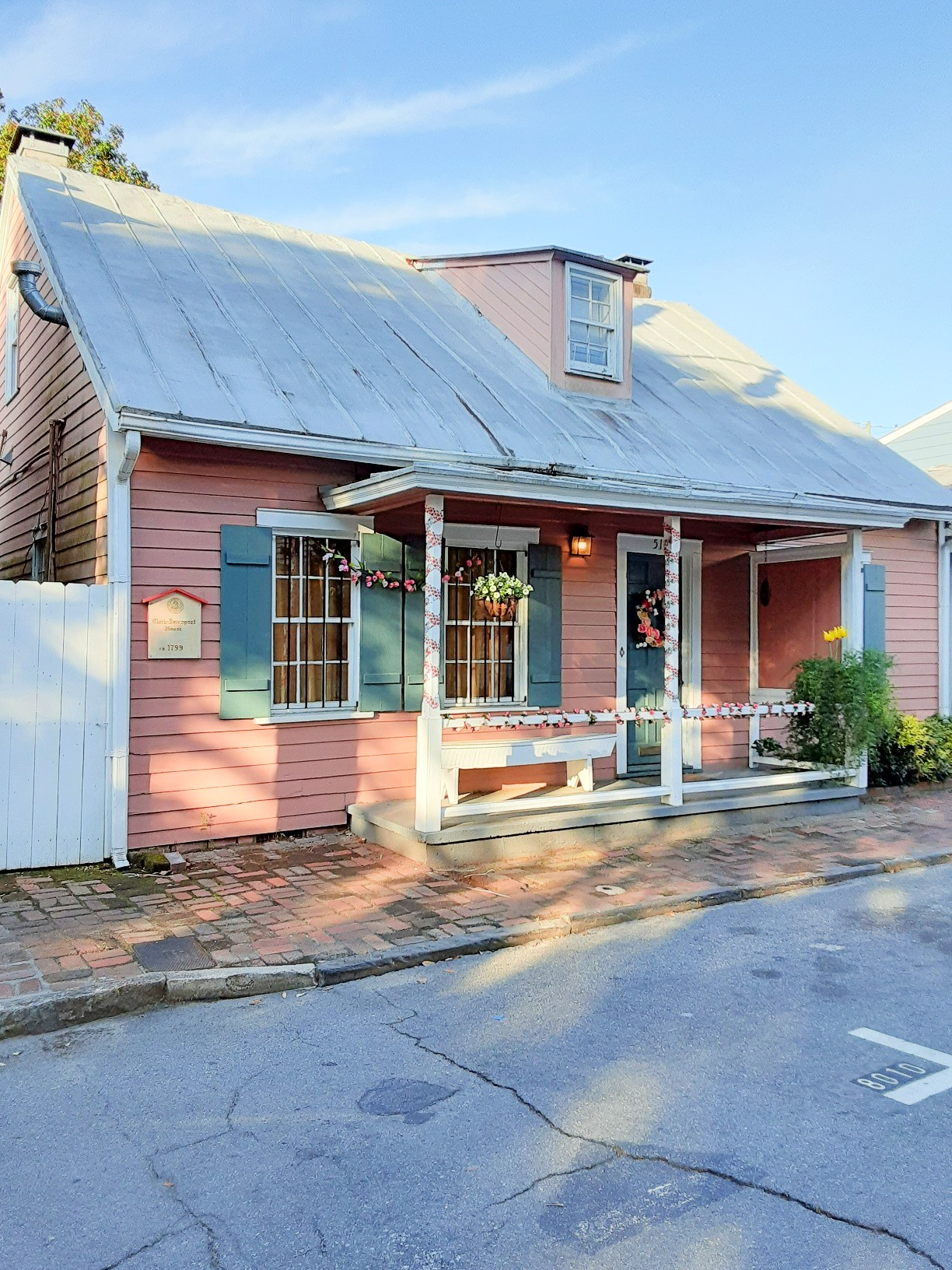
- The building in 2022
- Interactive map of the Susannah Clarke Cottage area

General information
- Location: 517 East York Street, Savannah, Georgia, United States
- Coordinates: 32.076043°N 81.0866129°W
- Completed: Between 1801 and 1808

Technical details
- Floor count: 2

The Susannah Clarke Cottage is a historic building in Savannah, Georgia, United States. It is located at 517 East York Street, in the southwestern corner of Greene Square, in the Savannah Historic District. It was built for Susannah R. Clarke at some point between 1801 and 1808.

Historian and preservationist Mary Lane Morrison found the building to be of significant status. It is also listed in The National Trust's Guide to Savannah, which notes that it was one of many Savannah houses built low to the ground "with a rustic add-on porch or front gallery."

== See also ==
- Buildings in Savannah Historic District
