= George Jones (Georgia politician) =

United States Senator (1766–1838)

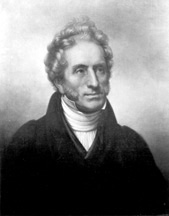

United States Senator from Georgia
- In office August 27, 1807 – November 7, 1807
- Appointed by: Jared Irwin
- Preceded by: Abraham Baldwin
- Succeeded by: William H. Crawford

Personal details
- Born: February 25, 1766 Savannah, Georgia
- Died: November 13, 1838 (aged 72) Savannah, Georgia
- Party: Democratic-Republican
- Parent: Noble Wimberly Jones

George Jones (February 25, 1766 – November 13, 1838) was a United States senator from Georgia. Born in Savannah, he received an academic training, studied medicine with his father, and practiced for a number of years. He participated in the American Revolutionary War. He was captured by the British Army as a prisoner of war and during 1780 and 1781 was imprisoned upon an English ship. He was later a member of the Georgia House of Representatives and Georgia Senate, and during the War of 1812 he served as captain of a company of Savannah reserves. He was a member of the Savannah board of aldermen in 1793–1794, 1802–1803, and 1814–1815, and was mayor of Savannah from 1812 to 1814. He was appointed judge of the eastern judicial circuit of Georgia in 1804, and served until he became a U.S. senator, appointed to fill the vacancy caused by the death of Abraham Baldwin and serving from August 27, 1807, to November 7, 1807, when a successor was elected.

Jones died in Savannah and was interred in Bonaventure Cemetery.

His father, Noble Wimberly Jones, was a Georgia delegate to the Continental Congress, and his grandfather, Noble Jones, was one of Georgia's first settlers who established Wormsloe Plantation outside Savannah.

== See also ==
- 510 East York Street, one of his former properties in Savannah

U.S. Senate
Preceded by Abraham Baldwin	U.S. senator (Class 2) from Georgia; August 27, 1807 - November 7, 1807; Served alongside: John Milledge	Succeeded by William H. Crawford
