= 510 East York Street =

Historic house in Savannah, Georgia

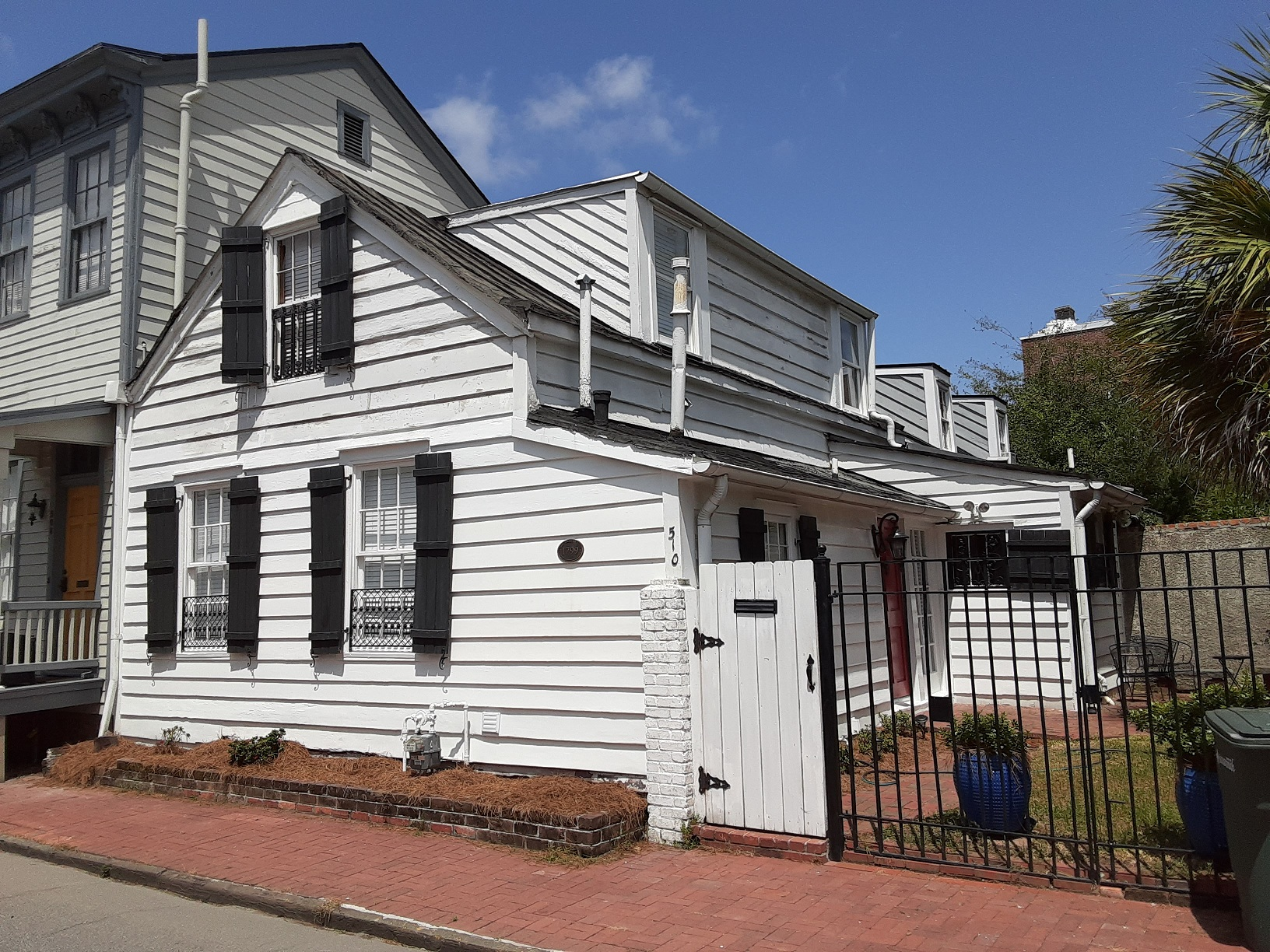
- The building in 2021
- Interactive map of the 510 East York Street area

General information
- Location: Savannah, Georgia, U.S., 510 East York Street
- Coordinates: 32.07623000°N 81.08674200°W
- Completed: c. 1799 (227 years ago)

Technical details
- Floor count: 2

510 East York Street is a home in Savannah, Georgia, United States, located in the southwestern trust lot of Greene Square. It was built around 1799, as a property of U.S. senator George Jones, making it one of the three remaining buildings original to the square and one of the few remaining 18th-century buildings in the city. It is part of the Savannah Historic District.

In 1851, it was owned by Mary E. Coe.

A survey for Historic Savannah Foundation, undertaken Mary Lane Morrison, found the building to be of significant status.

== See also ==
- Buildings in Savannah Historic District
