= Pirates' House =

Restaurant in Savannah, Georgia, US

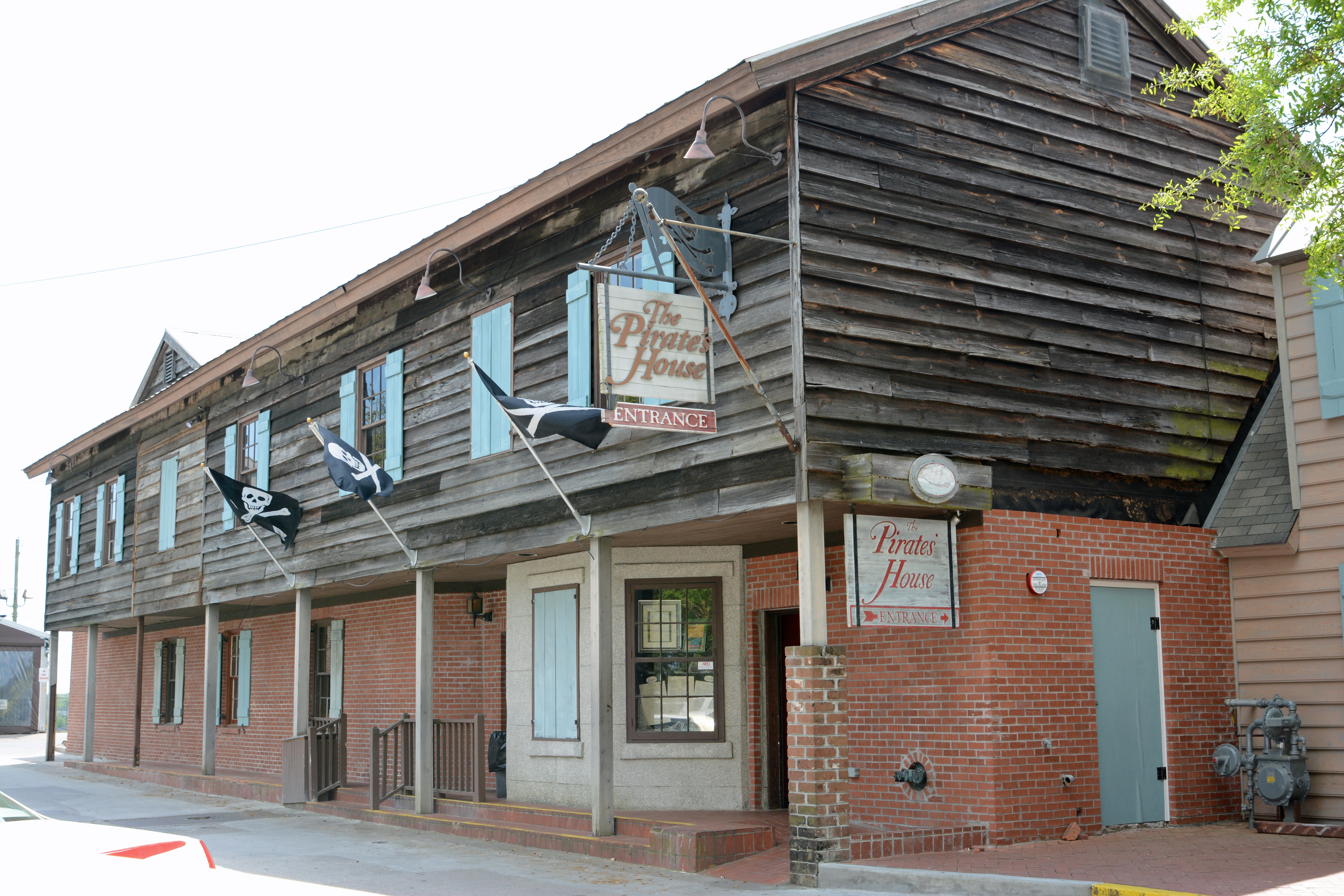
- Pirates' House northern façade, which faces onto Trustees Garden
- Interactive map of the Pirates' House area

General information
- Location: Savannah, Georgia, United States, 20 East Broad Street
- Coordinates: 32°04′42″N 81°05′02″W
- Completed: 1794 (232 years ago)
- Owner: The Savannah Gas Company

Technical details
- Floor count: 3

Pirates' House is a historic restaurant and tavern, established in 1734, in Savannah, Georgia, United States. It is considered the oldest bar in Georgia. A portion of the structure, known as the Herb House, was built in 1734. The structures either side of it developed between 1794 and 1871. The modern restaurant was founded by Herb Traub and Jim Casey in 1953, and is one of Savannah's most popular tourist attractions.

== History ==
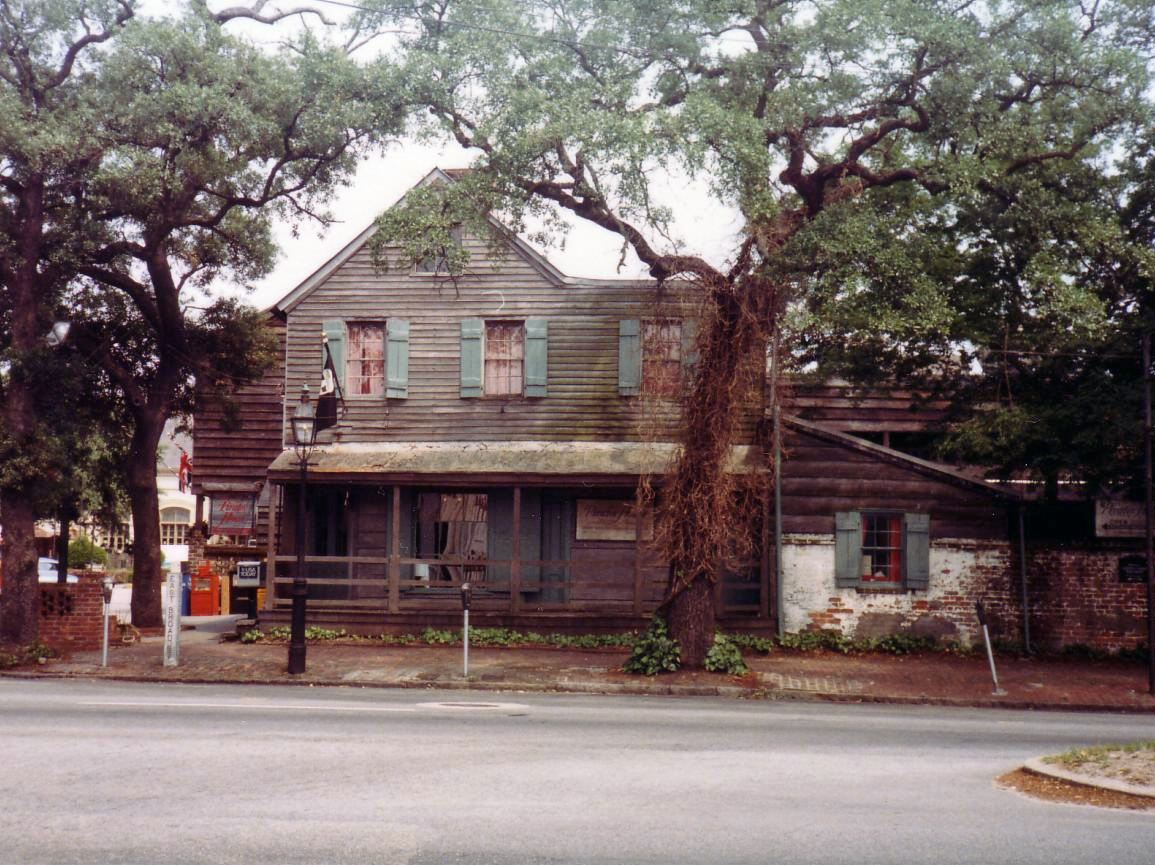
Pirates' House, from East Broad Street, in 1984

The Herb House was built on a ten-acre plot of land located on the east side of James Oglethorpe's original plan of the city of Savannah. The plot of land was assigned to become a botanical garden that modeled the Chelsea Botanical Garden in London, England. The garden, which was located beyond the bounds of today's buildings, was dedicated to Oglethorpe's trustees, becoming known as the Trustees' Garden.

A building was built on the plot of land in 1734 to house the gardener who worked there. This building was deemed the Herb House. A hay loft, where the gardener slept, was on the second floor of the building. The first floor was used for tools and gardening supplies.

== Renovation and ownership ==
In 1948, Pirates' House and the surrounding land was acquired by The Savannah Gas Company. The building soon caught the interest of Mrs. Hansell Hilyer, wife of the president of the company. She renewed the house museum into the restaurant of the present day. Pirates' House has fifteen dining rooms, can hold up to 120 guests, and serves a variety of southern dishes.

== References in popular culture ==
In Robert Louis Stevenson's 1883 novel Treasure Island, Pirate's House is where Captain Flint is claimed to have spent his last days, and his ghost is claimed to haunt the property.
