= Hay elevator =

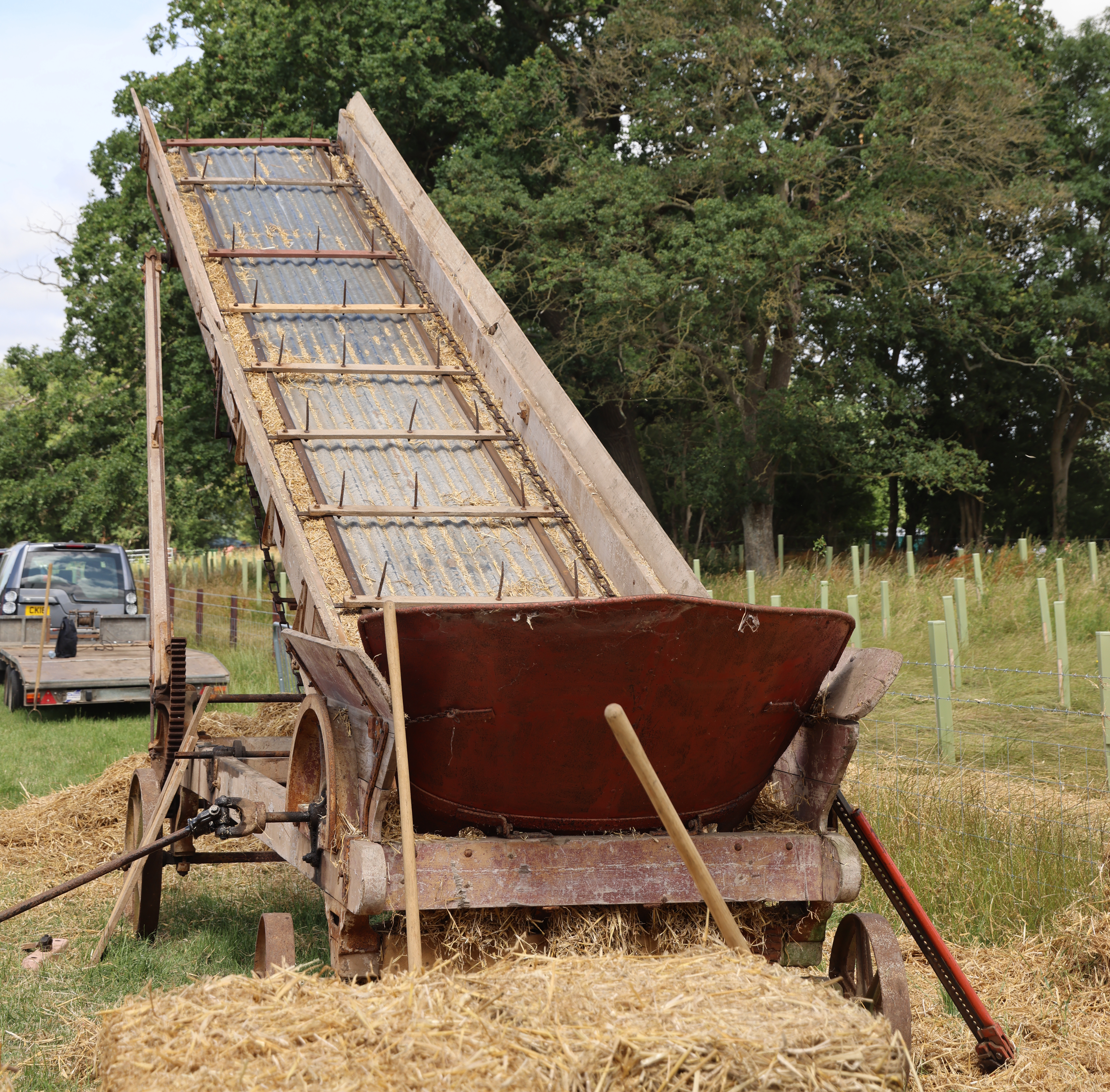
A 1900s hay elevator

A hay elevator is an elevator that hauls bales of hay or straw up to a hayloft, the section of a barn used for hay storage. Hay elevators are either ramped conveyor belts that bales rest on, or a mechanized pair of chains that holds bales taut between them.

The term hay elevator also includes machinery involved in the stacking and storage of bales. A typical hay elevator includes an open skeletal frame, with a chain that has dull 3-inch spikes every few feet along the chain to grab bales and drag them along. Prior to rural electrification, barns were equipped with a vertical pulley and a horizontal track along which a bale of hay was guided manually.

== See also ==
- Baler
