= East Broad Street =

Prominent street in Savannah, Georgia

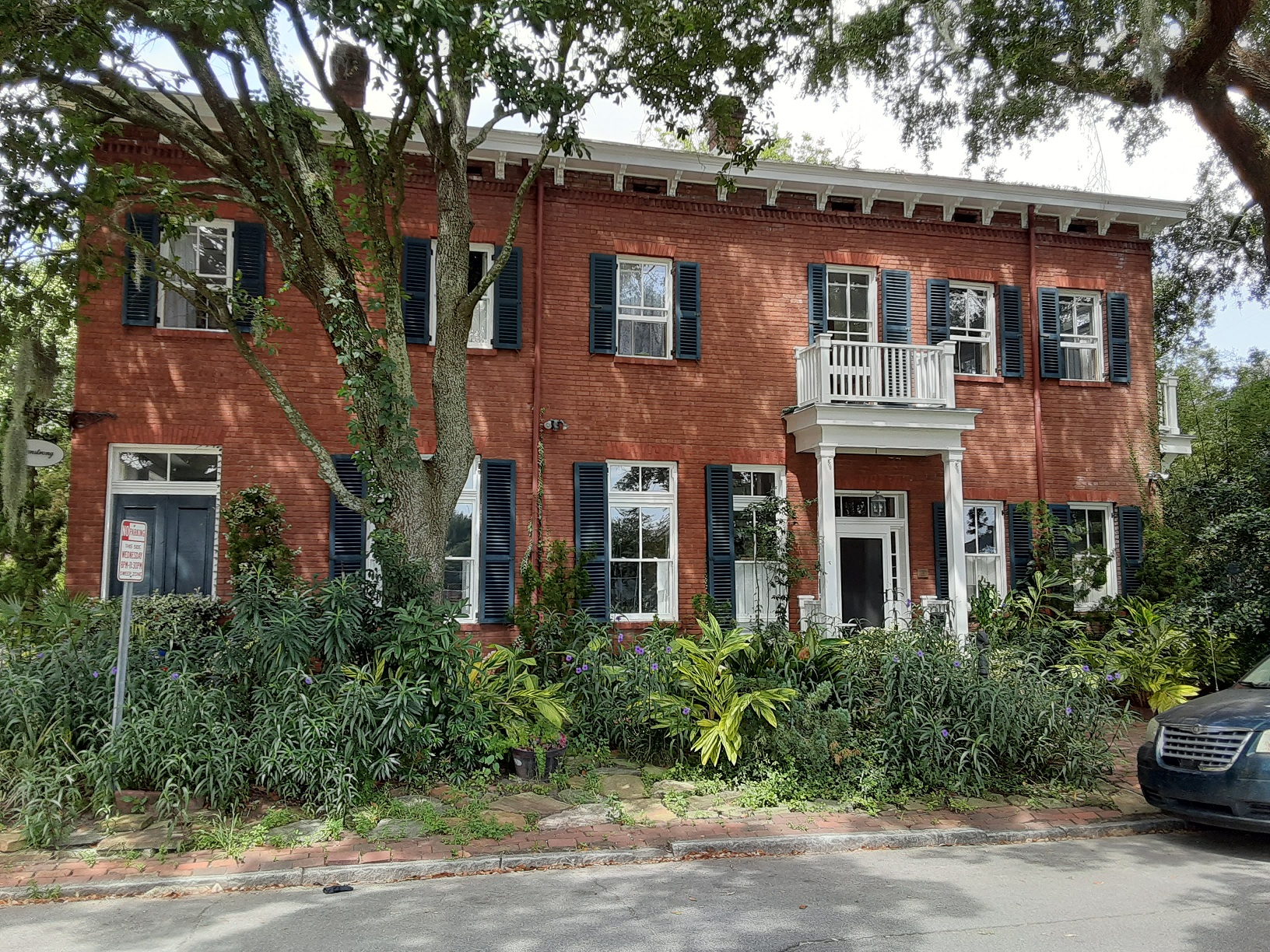
- 419–421 East Broad Street
- Length: 2.04 mi (3.28 km)
- Location: Savannah, Georgia, U.S.
- North end: East River Street
- South end: East Victory Drive (U.S. Route 80)

East Broad Street is a prominent street in Savannah, Georgia, United States. Located to the east of Price Street, at the eastern edge of Savannah's downtown, it runs for about 2.04 miles (3.28 km) from East Bay Street in the north to East Victory Drive (U.S. Route 80) in the south. The street's northern section passes through the Savannah Historic District, a National Historic Landmark District.

In 2025, the section of the street between Nicoll and Hartridge, was renamed Rev. Matthew Southall Brown Sr. Way. Brown, a pastor who served at St. John Baptist Church, on East Derenne Avenue, for 35 years, was born on the street in 1922.

== Notable buildings and structures ==
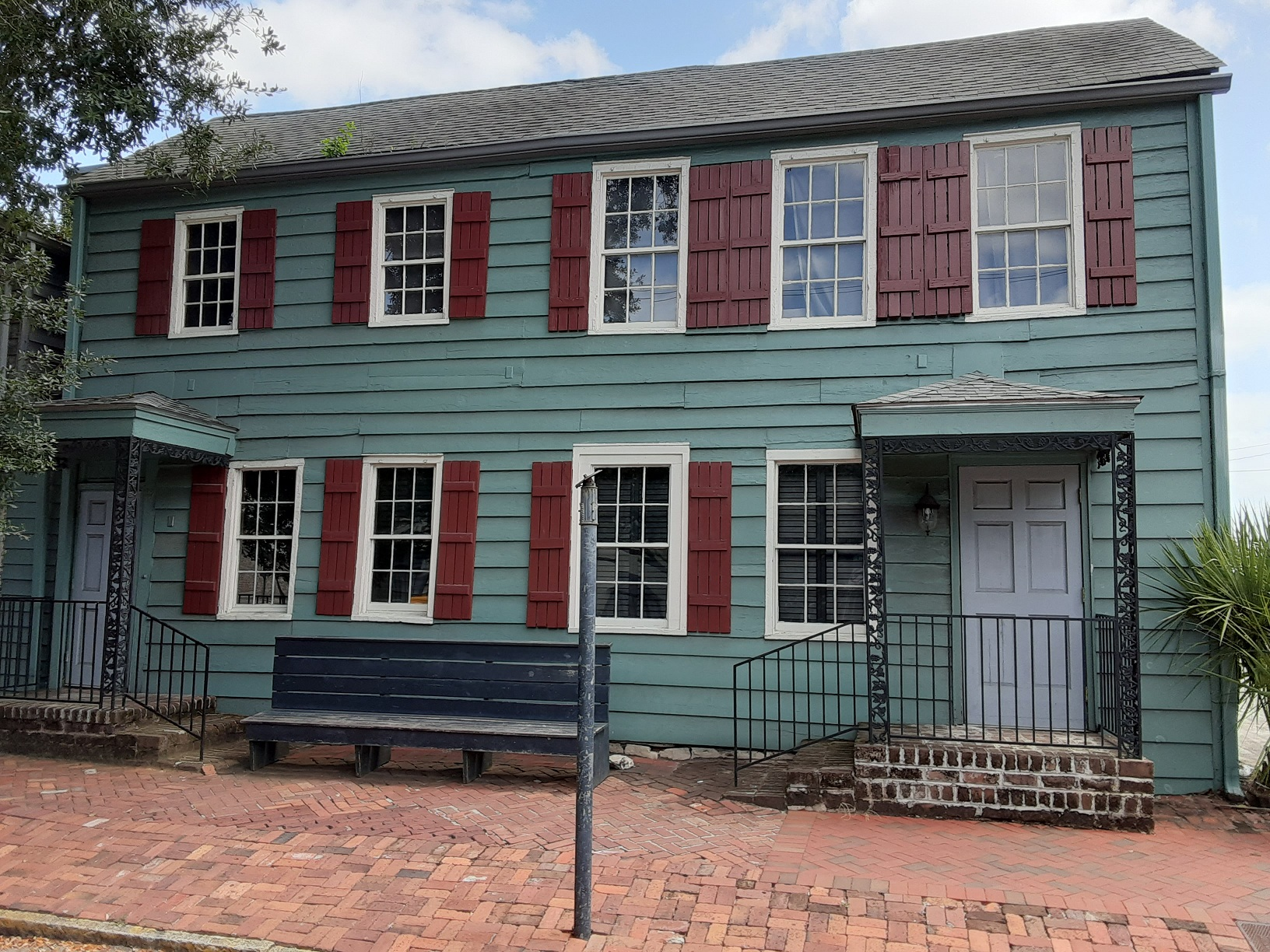
Joseph Gammon Duplex, 28–30 East Broad Street, built in 1840

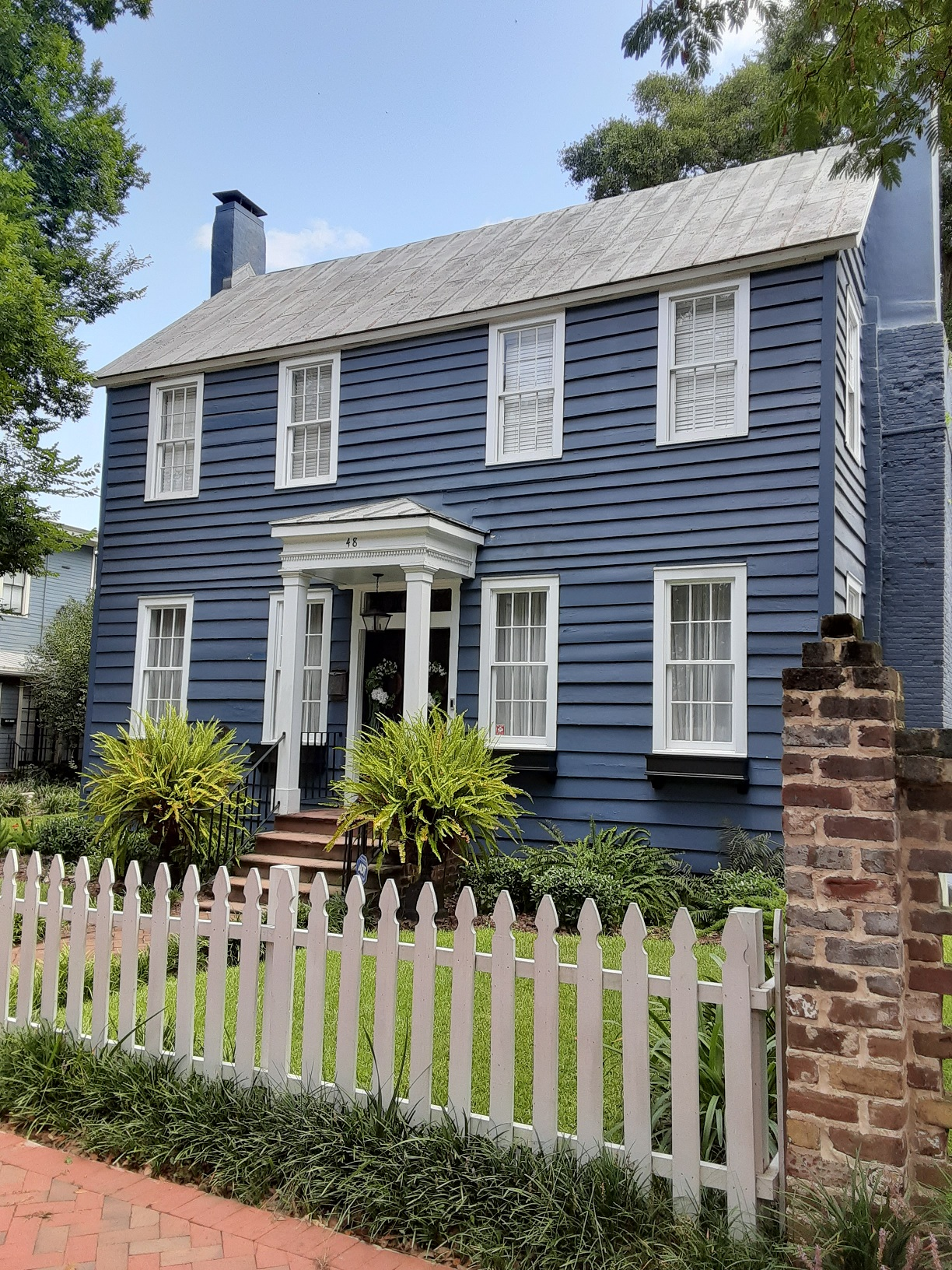
The Archibald Smith House, at 48 East Broad Street, dates to before 1830

Below is a selection of notable buildings and structures on East Broad Street, all in Savannah's Historic District. From north to south:

- Pirates' House, 20 East Broad Street (1794–1871)
- Herb House, 26 East Broad Street (by 1853)
- Joseph Gammon Duplex, 28–30 East Broad Street (1840)
- 31 East Broad Street (1860)
- Mary Foley House, 36 East Broad Street (1909)
- James McMahon House, 37–39 East Broad Street (1874)
- Charles Wood Row House, 41–47 East Broad Street (1899)
- Archibald Smith House, 48 East Broad Street (before 1830)
- John Foley Duplex, 52–56 East Broad Street (1874)
- 111 East Broad Street (1841)
- Michael Lavin (Estate of) Property, 143 East Broad Street (1889)
- 237–239 East Broad Street (1890)
- 241–243 East Broad Street (1895)
- 245–247 East Broad Street (1883)
- 251 East Broad Street/556 East Liberty Street (1883)
- 325–329 East Broad Street (1871)
- Henry Kuck/John Asendorf Commercial Property, 341–343 East Broad Street (1876)
- 345 East Broad Street (1876)
- 355 East Broad Street (1890)
- 419–421 East Broad Street (554 East Taylor Street) (1893)
- Saint Francis Home orphanage, 439 East Broad Street (1883)
- 517–519 East Broad Street (1897)
- 521–523 East Broad Street (1897)
- 529–531 East Broad Street (1900)
- 533–535 East Broad Street (circa 1900)
- Matilde Goetke Duplex (I), 619–621 East Broad Street (1898)
- Matilde Goetke Duplex (II), 623–625 East Broad Street (1898)
