= Stable =

Building for horses and other livestock

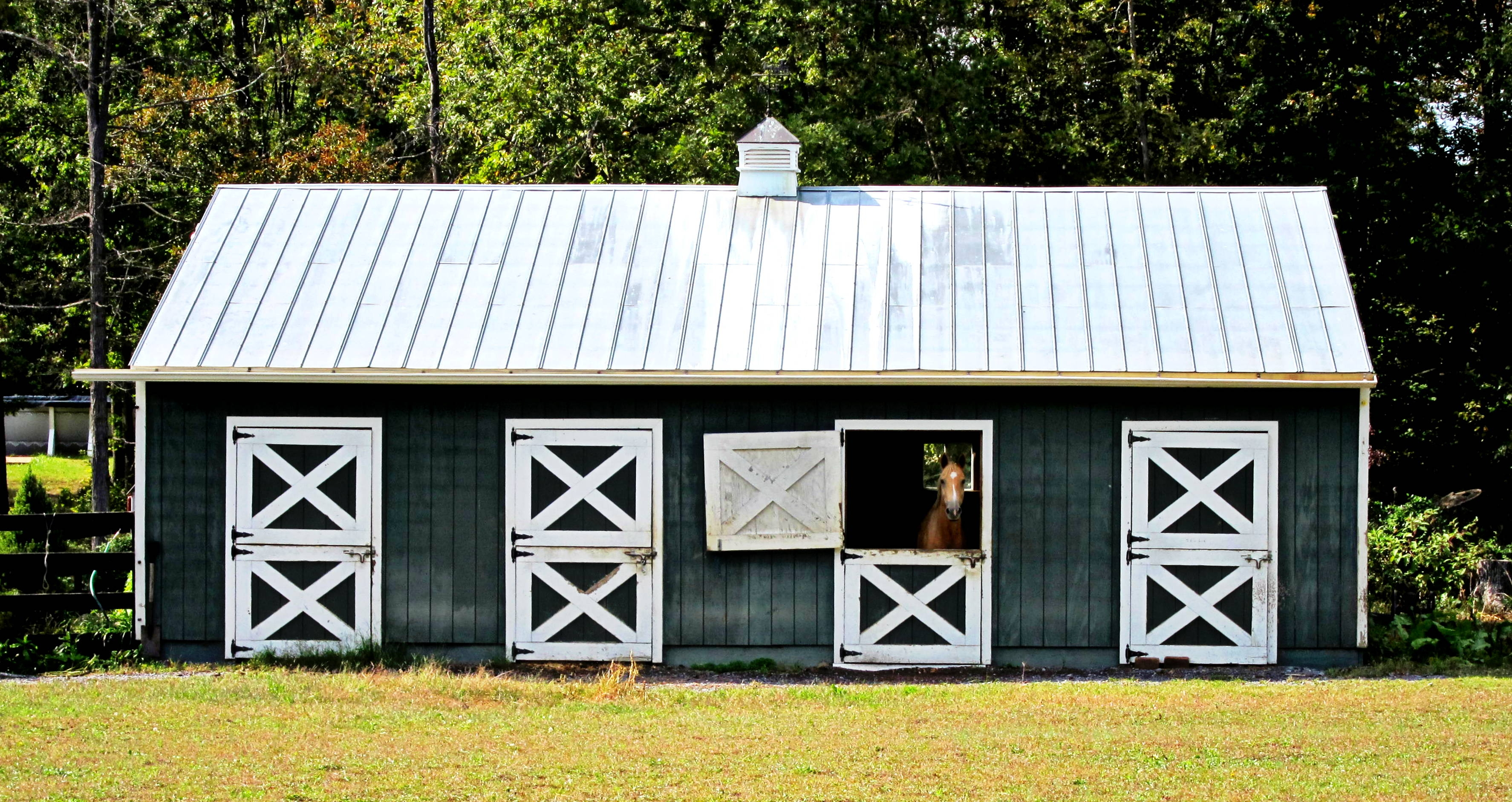
Small stable for 4 horses

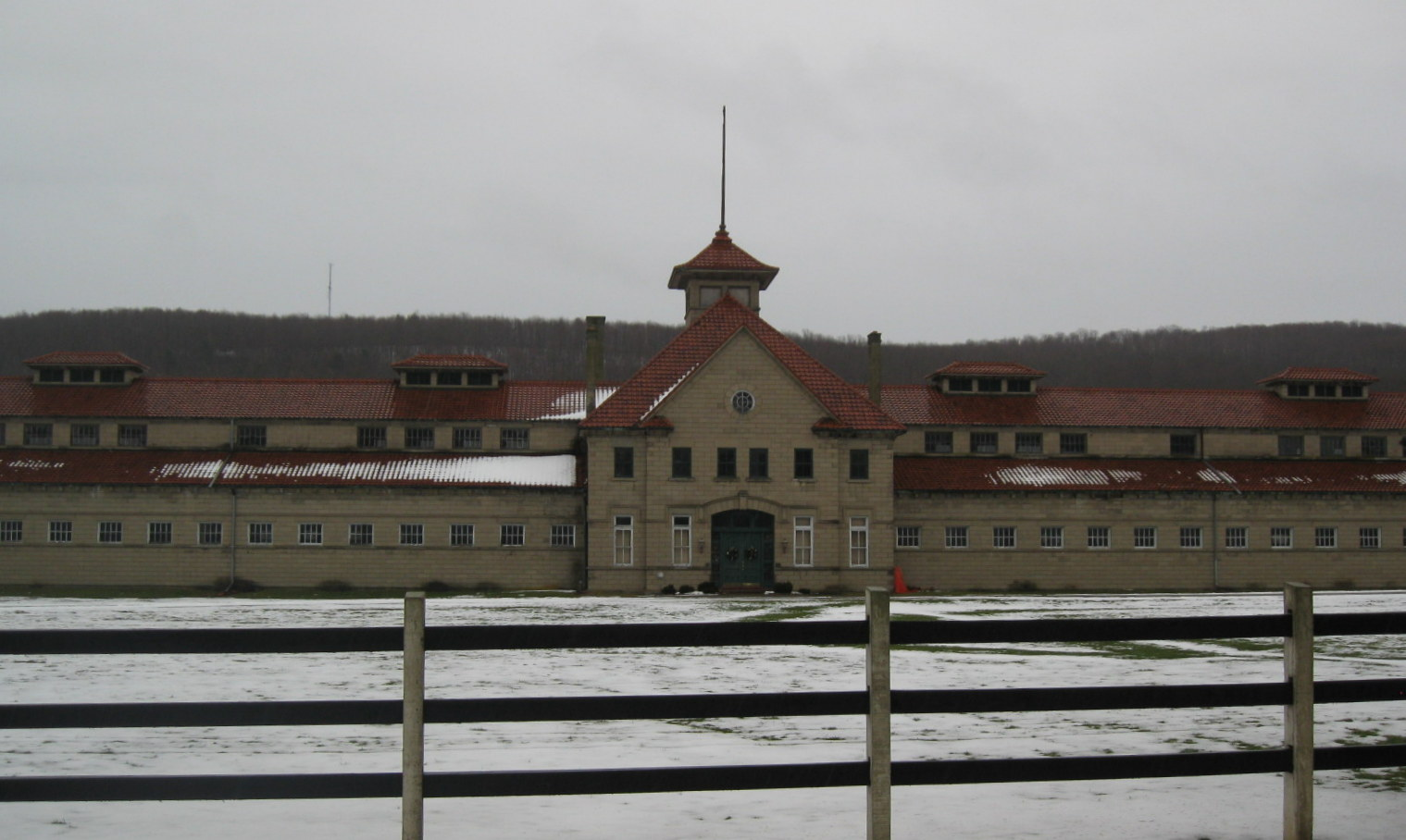
Large stable for dozens of horses

A stable or a stables is a building in which working animals are kept, especially horses or oxen. The building is usually divided into stalls, and may include storage for equipment and feed.

== Styles ==
There are many different types of stables in use today; the American-style stable called a barn, for instance, is a large barn with a door at each end and individual stalls inside or free-standing stables with top and bottom-opening doors. The term "stable" is additionally utilised to denote a business or a collection of animals under the care of a single owner, irrespective of their housing or whereabouts.

A building with tie stalls is also known as stanchion or stall barn, where animals are tethered by the head or neck to their stall. It is mostly used in the dairy cow industry, but traditionally horses were also tied up.

The exterior design of a stable can vary widely based on climate, building materials, historical period and cultural styles of architecture. A wide range of building materials can be used, including masonry (bricks or stone), wood and steel. Stables range in size from a small building housing one or two animals to large facilities that house hundreds of animals.

Layout styles

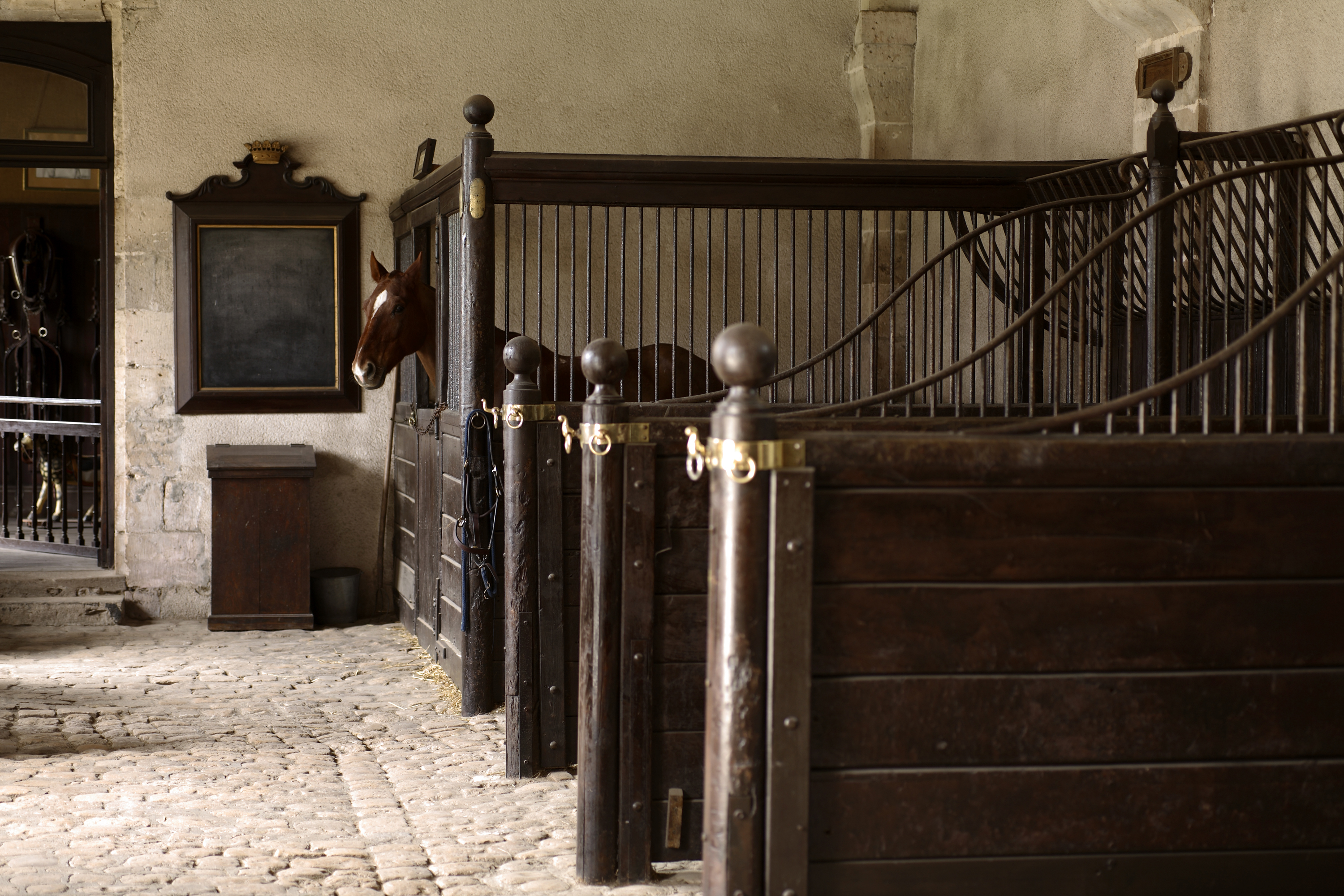
Typical early stable with a row of tie stalls and one box stall

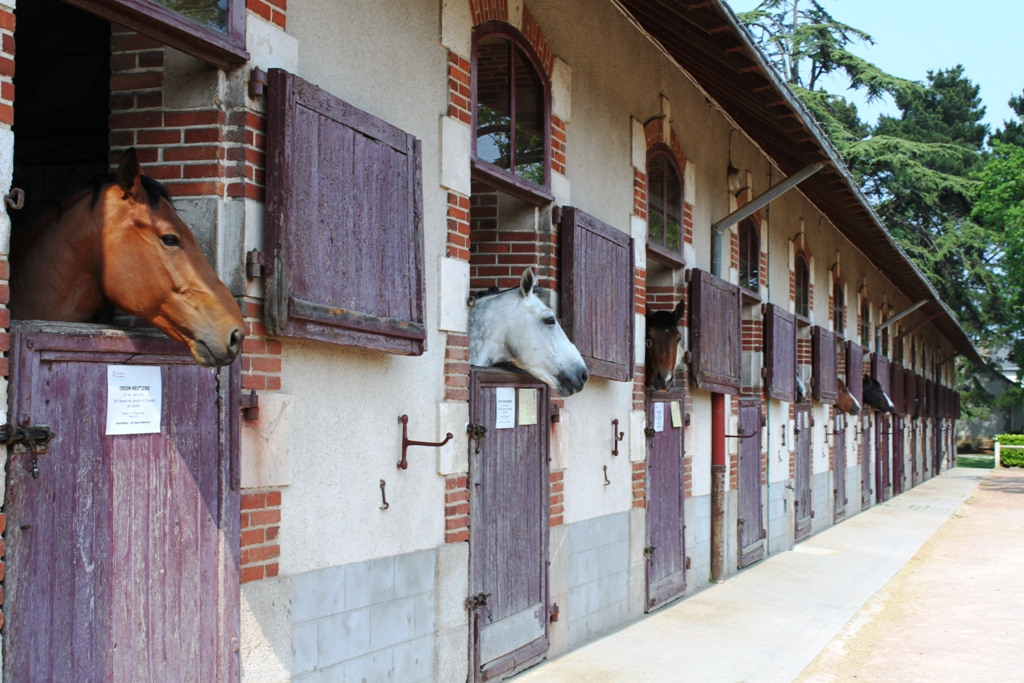
Traditional exterior-door stalls built in a row and facing a courtyard

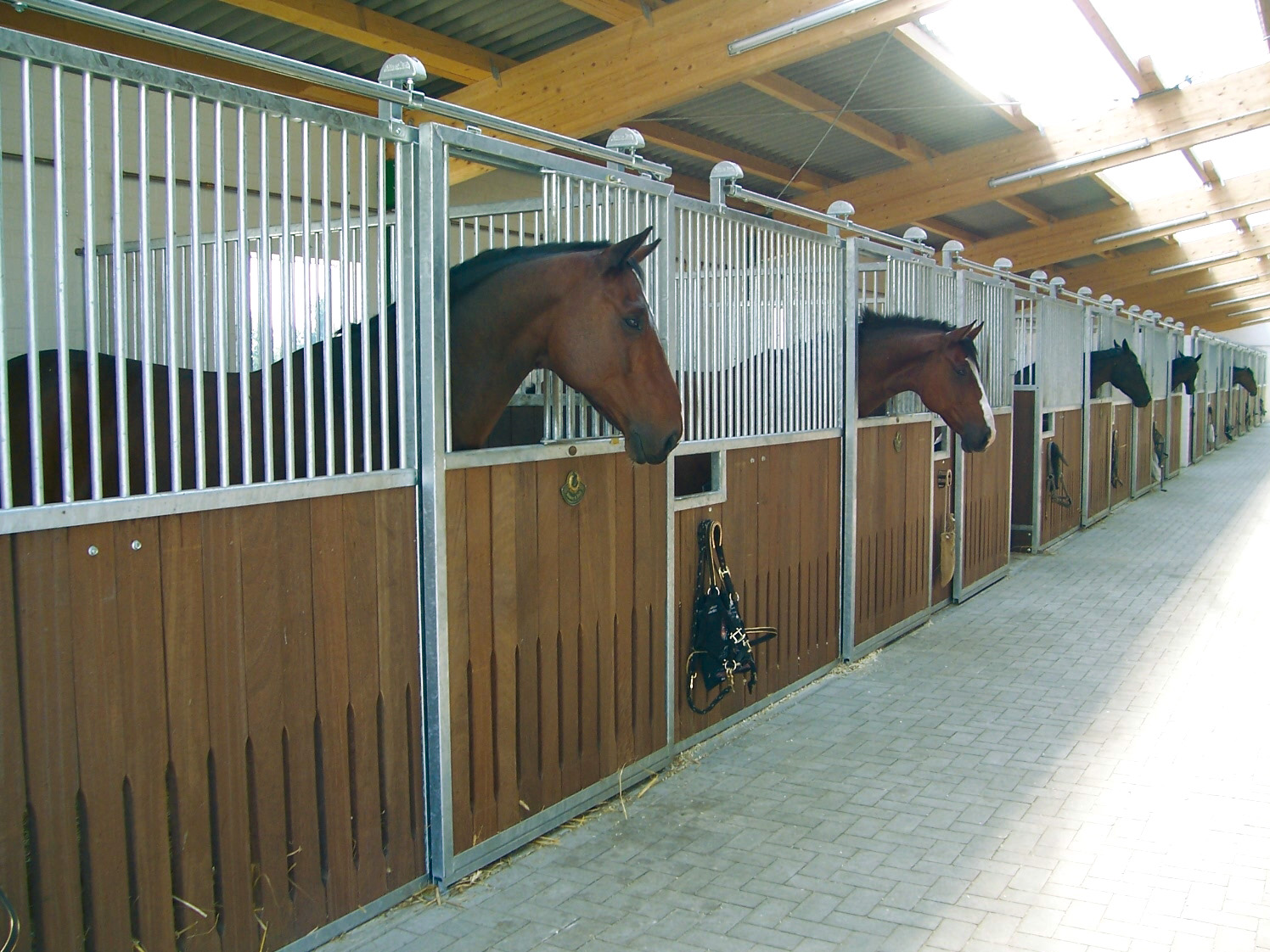
Freestanding stalls built inside a single large building

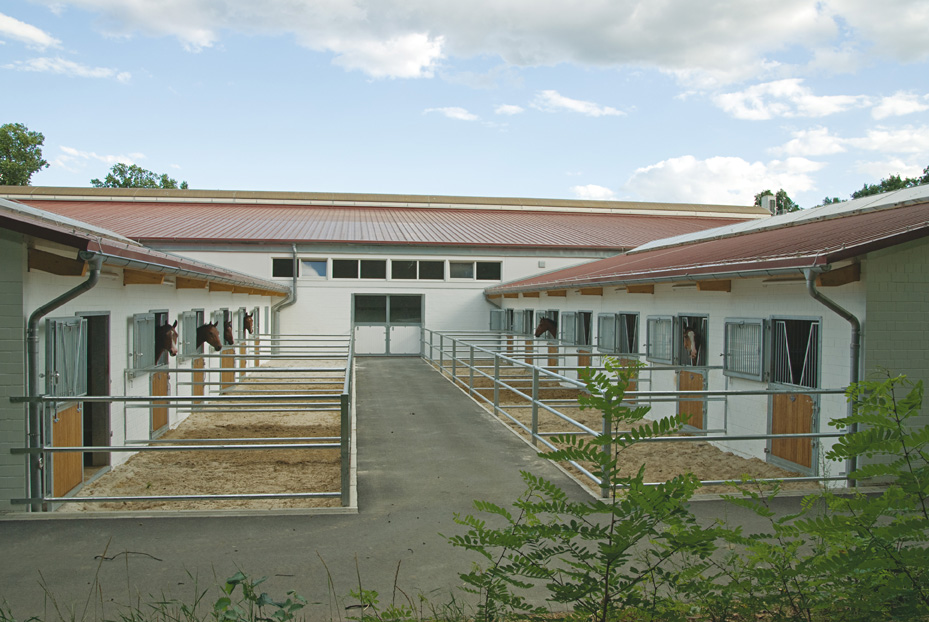
Each stall has a small fenced turnout area; access to each stall is from inside the building

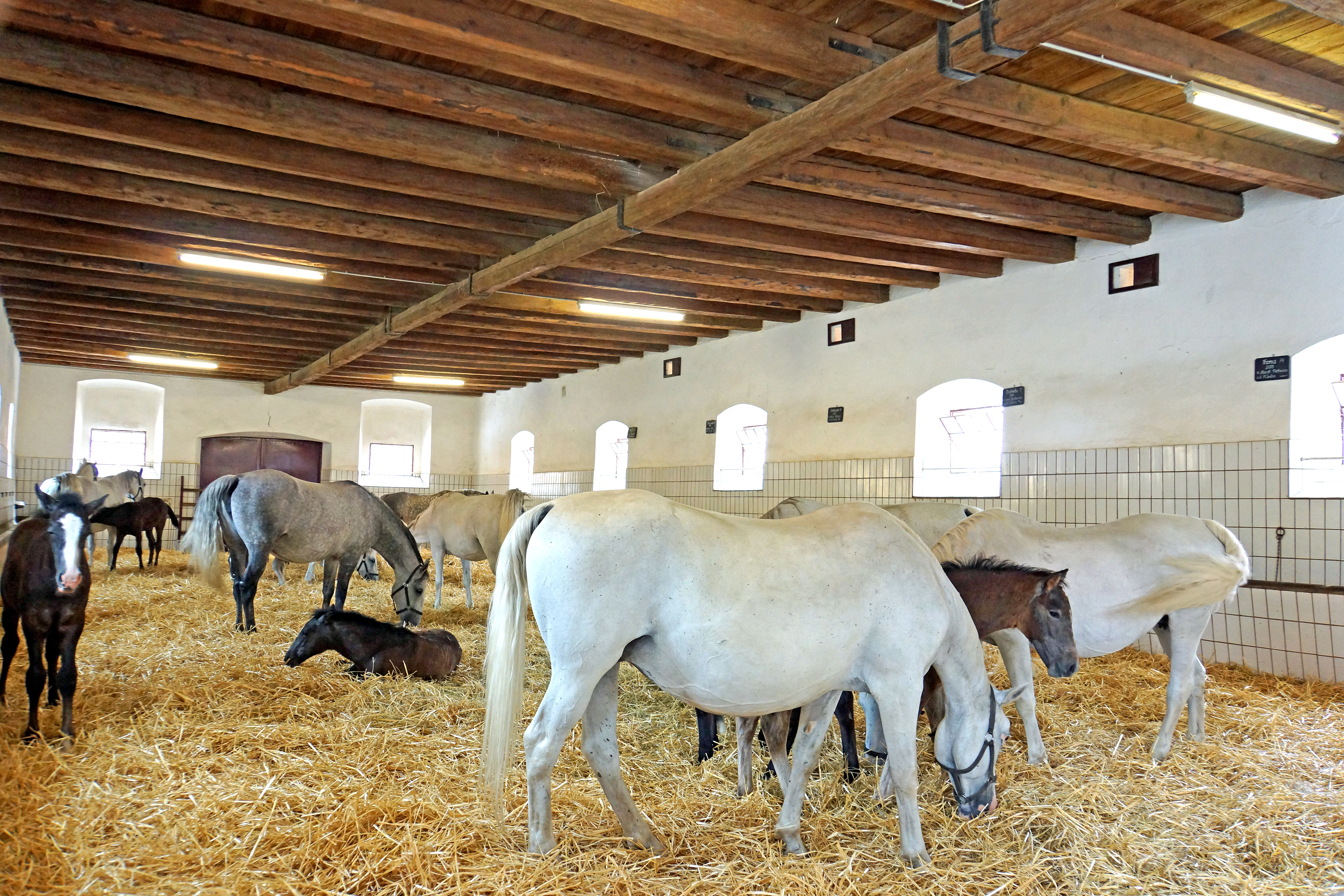
Stable with an open layout and no individual stalls

== History ==
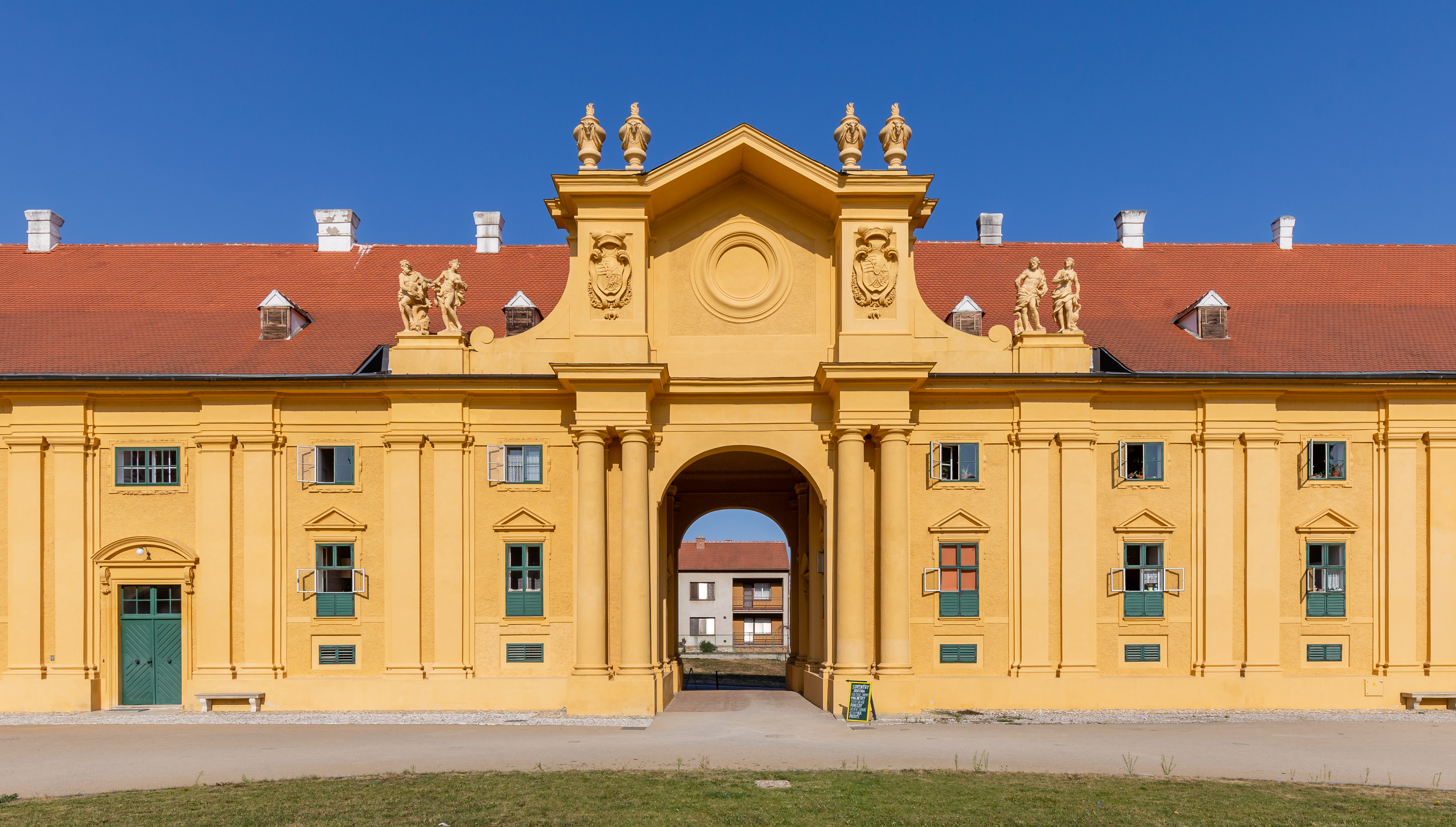
Stables and riding hall in Lednice Castle, Czech Republic

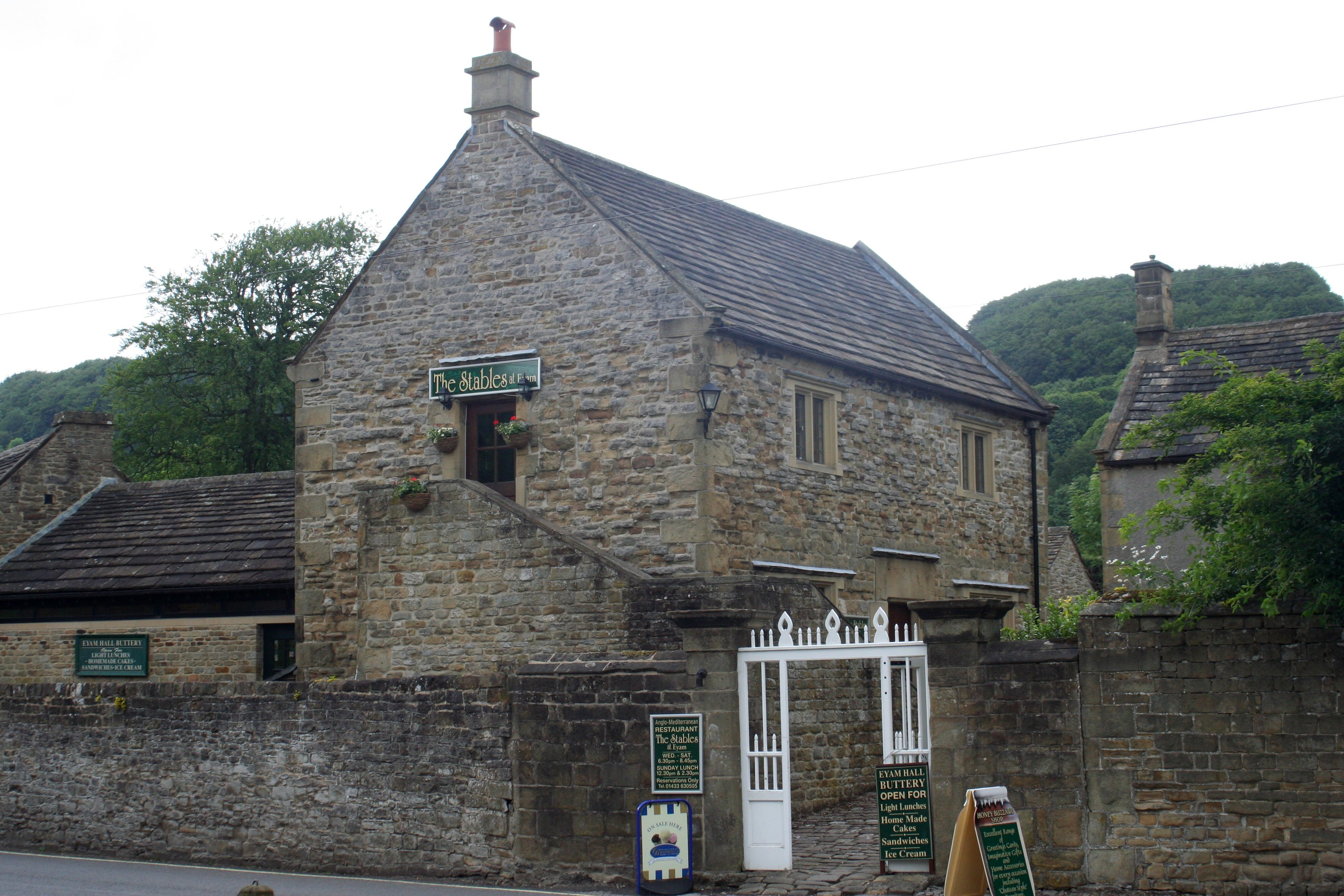
English two-story stone stables with exterior stone steps (use has been converted)

During the times when horses were the primary mode of transportation, European high society and royalty kept large stables of horses to pull carriages, ride, and breed. Many of these stables were elaborately constructed and still exist today.

In England, the stable was historically the second building constructed on a farm. The world's oldest horse stables were discovered in the ancient city of Pi-Ramesses in Qantir, in Ancient Egypt, and were established by Ramesses II (c. 1304–1213 BC). These stables covered approximately 182,986 square feet, had floors sloped for drainage, and could contain about 480 horses. Free-standing stables began to be built from the 16th century. They were well built and placed near the house since these animals were highly valued and carefully maintained. They were vital to the economy as well as an indicator of their owners' position in the community. Relatively few examples survive of complete interiors (i.e. with stalls, mangers and feed racks) from the mid-19th century or earlier.

Traditionally, stables in Great Britain had a hayloft on the upper floor and a pitching door at the front. Doors and windows were symmetrically arranged. Their interiors were divided into stalls and usually included a large stall for a foaling mare or sick horse. The floors were cobbled (or, later, bricked) and featured drainage channels. An outside stone stairway constructed against the side of the building was common for reaching the upper level.

== Other uses ==
The word stable is also used metonymically to refer to the collection of horses that the building contains (for example, the college's stable includes a wide variety of breeds) and even, by extension, metaphorically to refer to a group of people—often (but not exclusively) athletes—trained, coached, supervised or managed by the same person or organisation. For example, art galleries typically refer to the artists they represent as their stable of artists. Analogously, car enthusiast magazines sometimes speak of collectible cars in this way, referring to the cars in a collector's stable.

Historically, the headquarters of a unit of cavalry, not simply their horses' accommodation, was known as a "stable".

== See also ==
- Glossary of equestrian terms
- Horse management
- Livery stable
- Riding stable
- Pen (enclosure)
