= Hayloft =

Space above a barn, stable or cow-shed

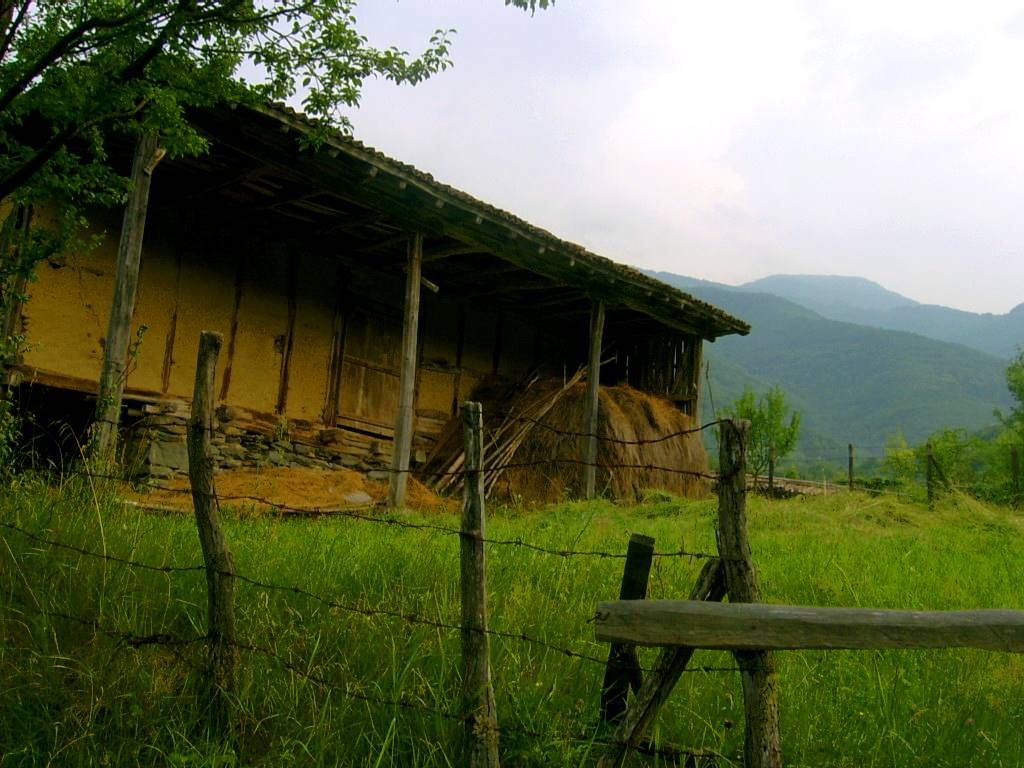
The hayloft of the village Chereshovitsa, Bulgaria

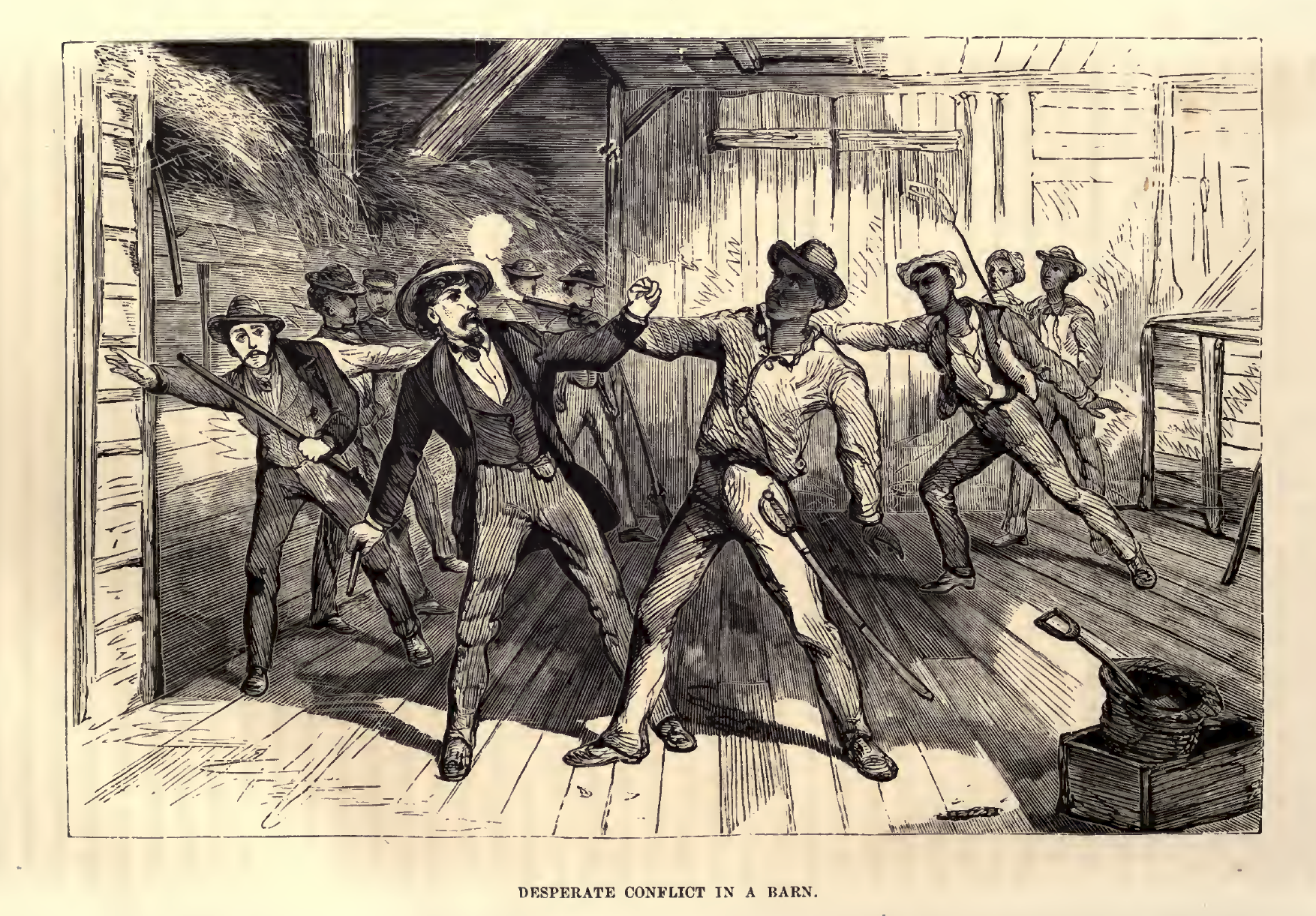
Desperate Conflict in a Barn, 1853. Haylofts were used to hide escaped slaves on the Underground Railroad.

A hayloft is a space above a barn, stable or cow-shed, traditionally used for storage of hay or other fodder for the animals below. Haylofts were used mainly before the widespread use of very large hay bales, which allow simpler handling of bulk hay.

The hayloft is filled with loose hay from the top of a wagon, thrown up through a large door, usually some 3 metres (10 ft) or more above the ground, often in the gable end of the building. Some haylofts have slots or holes (sometimes with hatches), each above a hay-rack or manger in the animal housing below. The hay could easily be dropped through the holes to feed the animals.

Another method of using a hayloft is to create small bundles of hay (1–4 cubic feet), then hoist them up using a block and tackle—in this case a hay elevator to the room. This allows for more efficiency when moving hay around.

The difference between a hayloft and a mow is significant. A mow is exposed to the weather, only elevated on a small platform off the ground. This is often used for drying hay. A hayloft is used for more permanent storage of hay. It is sheltered from the weather and where a modern-day attic would be.

A struggle in any type of keeping hay is that it must be totally dry. Otherwise, when piled up in a hayloft, it will start to compost. The insulation provided by the other hay ensures that thermophilic bacteria involved in the decomposition will be at their ideal temperature, thus turning the good hay into the dirt. That is also why farmers are so determined to keep hay off the ground since it would absorb moisture.

Haylofts in old buildings are now often used for other storage or have been converted into habitable rooms. However, farms that use small square hay bales may still use the hayloft for storage of hay.

Many farmers now use bales of hay so large they must be handled by machinery, and these are normally stored in more open buildings or outside. Others have forgone hay in favor of grain or silage.

== See also ==
- Hay rake
